= List of heavy metal bands =

This is a list of heavy metal artists from the formative years of the movement (formed between 1963 and 1981). For bands formed after 1981, please consult the lists for each heavy metal subgenre.

In the late 1960s, a number of bands began pushing the limits of blues rock into a new genre which would be called heavy metal.

In 1981, three of the "Big Four" thrash metal bands emerged (Metallica, Slayer and Anthrax), to be joined on the scene in 1983 by Megadeth.

== Heavy metal bands formed between 1963 and 1981 ==
Name	Origin	Years active	Brief summary
220 Volt	Sweden	1979–present	
44 Magnum	Japan	1977–1989, 2002–present	
A II Z	United Kingdom	1979–1982	
Lee Aaron	Canada	1980–present	Solo artist whose recorded output has spanned multiple genres, including heavy metal.
Accept	Germany	1976–present	
The Accused	United States	1981-2002, 2003–present	
AC/DC	Australia	1973–present	
Aerosmith	United States	1970–present	
Agnostic Front	United States	1980-1992, 1997–present	
Alice Cooper	United States	1968–present	
Angel	United States	1975–1981, 1987, 1998–present	
Ángeles del Infierno	Spain	1978–present	
Angel Witch	United Kingdom	1977–1982, 1984–1998, 2000–present	
The Angels/Angel City	Australia	1974–2000, 2008-present	
Anthem	Japan	1980–1992, 2000–present	
Anthrax	United States	1981–present	
Anvil	Canada	1978–present	
Armageddon	United Kingdom	1974–1976	
Atomic Mass	United Kingdom	1977, 2003	
Atomic Rooster	United Kingdom	1969–1975, 1980–1983, 2016–present	
Atomkraft	United Kingdom	1979–1988, 2005	
Attila	United States	1969–1970	Bandmembers included Billy Joel and Jon Small.
Axe	United States	1979–1984, 1997–2004	
Babe Ruth	United Kingdom	1970–1976, 2005–present	
Bang	United States	1969–1973, 2001–2004	
Barnabas	United States	1977–1986	
Barón Rojo	Spain	1980–present	
Battleaxe	United Kingdom	1980–1988, 2010–present	
Bengal Tigers	Australia	1979–present	
Beowülf	United States	1981–1995, 2000–present	
Bitch	United States	1980–present	First band to be signed by the Metal Blade Records label.
Black Death	United States	1977–present	The first all-African-American heavy metal band.
Black 'n Blue	United States	1981–1989, 1997, 2003, 2007–present	Lead guitarist Tommy Thayer joined Kiss in 2003.
Black Rose	United Kingdom	1980–1989, 2006–present	
Black Sabbath	United Kingdom	1968–2006, 2011–2017, 2025	Black Sabbath was formed by Ozzy Osbourne (lead vocals), Tony Iommi (guitar), Geezer Butler (bass guitar), and Bill Ward (drums). Alcohol abuse led to Ozzy Osbourne getting fired and replaced with former Rainbow vocalist Ronnie James Dio. Black Sabbath is considered to be the progenitor of doom metal, and, by extension, metal itself.
Black Widow	United Kingdom	1966–1973, 2007–present	
Bleak House	United Kingdom	1972–1983	
Blind Illusion	United States	1978–1989, 2009–present	
Blitzkrieg	United Kingdom	1980–1981, 1984–1991, 1992–1994, 1996–1999, 2001–present	
Bloodrock	United States	1969–1975	
Blue Cheer	United States	1966–1972, 1974–1976, 1978–1979, 1984–1994, 1999–2009	One of the earliest heavy metal acts. Cited as a major influence on the genres of stoner rock and grunge.
Blue Öyster Cult	United States	1967–present	
Bodine	Netherlands	1978–1984	
Boss	Australia	1979–1986	
Bow Wow	Japan	1975–present	Also known as Vow Wow for part of their career (1984–1990).
Bronz	United Kingdom	1976–1985, 1999–2000, 2003–2005, 2010–present	
Edgar Broughton Band	United Kingdom	1968–2010	Cited in the 2010 BBC TV documentary Heavy Metal Britannia as a formative influence on the genre in the UK.
Budgie	United Kingdom	1967–2010	
Buffalo	Australia	1971–1977	
Bulldozer	Italy	1980–1990, 2008–present	
Cactus	United States	1969–1972, 2006–present	
Captain Beyond	United States	1971–1973, 1976–1978, 1998–2003	
Chateaux	United Kingdom	1981–1985	
Cirith Ungol	United States	1972–1992, 1996–2001, 2015–present	
Cloven Hoof	United Kingdom	1979–1990, 2000–present	
Coven	United States	1968–1975, 2007–present	
Crimson Glory	United States	1979–1992, 1998–present	
Crushed Butler	United Kingdom	1969–1971	
Dayglo Abortions	Canada	1979 - present	
Death SS	Italy	1977–1984, 1988–present	
Dedringer	United Kingdom	1977–1985	
Deep Machine	United Kingdom	1979–1982, 2009–2015	
Deep Purple	United Kingdom	1968–1976, 1984–present	
Def Leppard	United Kingdom	1977–present	The band began as a heavy metal outfit.
Demon	United Kingdom	1979–present	Headlined the first British Steel Festival in 2006.
The Deviants	United Kingdom	1967–1969, 1978, 1984, 1996, 2002, 2011–present	Singer and writer Mick Farren died on 27 July 2013.
Diamond Head	United Kingdom	1976–1985, 1991–1994, 2002–present	
Die Krupps	Germany	1980–present	
Divlje Jagode	Yugoslavia / Bosnia and Herzegovina	1977–present	
Dokken	United States	1978–1989, 1993–present	
Doro	Germany	1980–present	
Dust	United States	1969–1972	Drummer Marc Bell joined The Ramones in 1978.
Earthshaker	Japan	1978–1994, 1999–present	
Easy Action	Sweden	1981–1986, 2006–present	
E.F. Band	Sweden	1978–1986	
Electric Sun	Germany	1978–1986	
Elf	United States	1967–1975	Ronnie James Dio on vocals.
Ethel the Frog	United Kingdom	1976–1980	
Europe	Sweden	1979–1992, 1999 (partial reunion), 2003–present	The band began as a heavy metal outfit.
Exciter	Canada	1978–present	
Exodus	United States	1979–1993, 1997–1998, 2001–present	The band had guitarist Kirk Hammett in its original lineup before he joined Metallica in 1983.
Faith No More	United States	1979-1998, 2009–present	
Fallout	United States	1979–1982	
Fist	United Kingdom	1978–1982, 2001–2006	
Flotsam and Jetsam	United States	1981–present	
Flower Travellin' Band	Japan	1967–1973, 2007–present	
The Flying Hat Band	United Kingdom	1971–1974	Glenn Tipton on vocals and guitar, later joined Judas Priest in 1974.
Lita Ford	United States	1975-1995, 2008–present	
Gamma	United States	1978–1983, 2000	
Geordie	United Kingdom	1972–1980, 1982–1985, 2001	Singer Brian Johnson went on to join AC/DC in 1980, after the death of Bon Scott.
Gillan	United Kingdom	1978–1983	
Girl	United Kingdom	1979–1982	
Girlschool	United Kingdom	1978–present	All-female band formed during the new wave of British heavy metal.
Gordi	Yugoslavia	1977–1984	
Grand Funk Railroad	United States	1968–1977, 1980–1983, 1996–present	
Granicus	United States	1969-1973, 2016	
Grave Digger	Germany	1980–1987, 1991–present	
Gravestone	Germany	1977–1986	
Great White	United States	1977–2001, 2006–present	The band began as a heavy metal outfit.
Green Jellÿ	United States	1981–1995, 2008–present	Comedy band.
Grim Reaper	United Kingdom	1979–1988, 2006–present	
The Gun	United Kingdom	1967–1970	
Sammy Hagar	United States	1967–present	
The Handsome Beasts	United Kingdom	1972–present	
Hanoi Rocks	Finland	1979–1985, 2001–2009, 2022	
Hard Stuff	United Kingdom	1971–1973	
Hawkwind	United Kingdom	1969–present	
Headpins	Canada	1979–present	
Heaven	Australia	1980–2000	
Heavy Load	Sweden	1976–1985	
Heavy Metal Kids	United Kingdom	1972–1985, 2002–present	Initially featured actor Gary Holton on vocals.
Helix	Canada	1974–present	
Help	United States	1970–1971	
Jimi Hendrix	United States	1963–1970	As a part of The Jimi Hendrix Experience and Band of Gypsys, Hendrix was one of the pioneering proto-metal acts, with his feedback-heavy brand of acid rock.
High Tide	United Kingdom	1969–1970	
Hollow Ground	United Kingdom	1979–1982, 2007, 2013	
Holocaust	United Kingdom	1977–present	
Holy Moses	Germany	1980–1994, 2000–present	
Icon	United States	1979–1990, 2008–present	
Iron Butterfly	United States	1966–2021	Second guitarist Erik Braunn died in 2003 of a heart attack. Original bassist Lee Dorman died on 21 December 2012. Drummer Ron Bushy died on 29 August 2021.
Iron Claw	United Kingdom	1969–1974, 1993, 2010–present	
Iron Maiden	United Kingdom	1975–present	Iron Maiden achieved success during the early 1980s. After several line-up changes, the band went on to release a series of U.S. and UK platinum and gold albums, including 1982's The Number of the Beast, 1983's Piece of Mind, 1984's Powerslave, 1985's live release Live After Death, 1986's Somewhere in Time and 1988's Seventh Son of a Seventh Son.
Jag Panzer	United States	1981–1988, 1994–2011	
Jaguar	United Kingdom	1979–1985, 1998–present	
Jameson Raid	United Kingdom	1975–1983, 2008–present	
Jerusalem	United Kingdom	1972–present	Produced and managed by Ian Gillan of Deep Purple. Early creators of Metal. Remastered vinyl and CD versions of original Decca, Deram and Universal releases have been reissued by Rockadrome Records.
Josefus	United States	1969–2005	
JPT Scare Band	United States	1973–present	
Judas Priest	United Kingdom	1969–present	
Kat	Poland	1979–1987, 1990–1999, 2002–present	
Kerber	Serbia	1981–present	
Kick Axe	Canada	1976–1988, 2003–present	
Killer	Belgium	1980–present	
Killer Dwarfs	Canada	1981–1997, 2001–present	
Killing Joke	United Kingdom	1978–1996, 2002–present	
King's X	United States	1979–present	
Kiss	United States	1973–2023	
Kix	United States	1977–1996, 2003–present	
Krokus	Switzerland	1974–present	
Leaf Hound	United Kingdom	1969–1971, 2004–present	
Leatherwolf	United States	1981–present	
Led Zeppelin	United Kingdom	1968–1980, 2007, 2011	
Legs Diamond	United States	1975–present	
Leño	Spain	1978–1983	
Leviticus	Sweden	1981–1990	
Lionheart	United Kingdom	1980–1986, 2016-present	
The Litter	United States	1966-1972	
Līvi	Latvia	1976–present	
Living Death	Germany	1980–1991	
London	United States	1978–1981, 1984–1990, 2006–present	Early lineups featured future members of Mötley Crüe, Guns N' Roses, W.A.S.P. and Cinderella.
Lone Star	United Kingdom	1975–1978	
Los Suaves	Spain	1980–present	
Loudness	Japan	1980–present	
Lucifer's Friend	Germany	1970–1982, 1993–1997, 2014–present	
Mahogany Rush	Canada	1970–1980, 1998–present	
Malice	United States	1980–1989, 2006–present	
Yngwie Malmsteen	Sweden	1978–present	
Mama's Boys	Ireland	1978–1993	
Manilla Road	United States	1977–1992, 1994–2018	
Manowar	United States	1980–present	Drummer Scott Columbus died on 4 April 2011.
Marseille	United Kingdom	1976-1984, 2008-2014, 2017-2019	
Max Webster	Canada	1973–1982	
May Blitz	United Kingdom	1969–1972	
MC5	United States	1964-1972, 1992, 2003-2012	One of the earliest influences on the genre, as well as one of the earliest punk rock bands.
Mentors	United States	1976–present	
Mercyful Fate	Denmark	1981–1985, 1992–1999	King Diamond on vocals.
Metal Church	United States	1980–1994, 1998–2009, 2012–present	
Metallica	United States	1981–present	Bassist Cliff Burton died on 27 September 1986.
Ministry	United States	1981–2008, 2011–present	Started as a new wave act. Later known for Industrial metal/thrash music.
Misfits	United States	1977–1983, 1995–present	
Montrose	United States	1973–1976, 2005	
More	United Kingdom	1980–1982, 1985, 1998–2000, 2011–present	
Mötley Crüe	United States	1981–2015, 2018–present	
Motörhead	United Kingdom	1975–2015	Lemmy died on 28 December 2015.
Mountain	United States	1969–1972, 1973–1974, 1981–1985, 1992–1998, 2001–2010	
Moxy	Canada	1974-1983, 1999-2009	
Napalm Death	United Kingdom	1981-present	
Nazareth	United Kingdom	1968–present	
Necromandus	United Kingdom	1970–1973	
The Next Band	United Kingdom	1978–1982	
Nightmare	France	1979–1987, 1999–present	
Night Sun	Germany	1970–1973	
Nightwing	United Kingdom	1978–1987, 1996–present	
Ted Nugent	United States	1975–present	
The Obsessed	United States	1976–1986, 1990–1995, 2011–present	
Ozzy Osbourne	United Kingdom	1979–2025	He was known as the first frontman of Black Sabbath. (1968-1979, reunion - 1998-2017)
Ostrogoth	Belgium	1980–1988, 2002, 2010–present	
Overkill	United States	1980–present	
Oz	Finland	1977–1991, 2010–present	
Pagan Altar	United Kingdom	1978–1982, 2004–present	
Pantera	United States	1981–2003	Started as a glam metal band.
Pentagram	United States	1971–1976, 1978–1979, 1981–present	
Persian Risk	United Kingdom	1979–1986	
Picture	Netherlands	1979–1987, 1997–1999, 2007–present	
Pink Fairies	United Kingdom	1970–1976, 1987–1988	
Plasmatics	United States	1977-1983, 1987-1988	
Pomaranča	Yugoslavia / Slovenia	1979–1986, 1994–present	
Praying Mantis	United Kingdom	1974–present	
Pretty Maids	Denmark	1981–present	
Primevil	United States	1973–1974	
Quartz	United Kingdom	1974–1983, 1996, 2011-present	
Queensrÿche	United States	1981–present	
Quiet Riot	United States	1975–present	
Rainbow	United Kingdom/United States	1975–1984, 1993–1997, 2016–present	Guitarist Ritchie Blackmore formed Rainbow in 1975 after leaving Deep Purple.
Ratt	United States	1976–1992, 1996–present	
Raven	United Kingdom	1974–present	
Rhinoceros	United States	1967-1970, 2009	
Riot	United States	1975–1984, 1986–present	
Rock Goddess	United Kingdom	1977–1987, 1994–1995, 2009, 2015–present	
Rocky Kramer	United States	2018–present	
Rok Mašina	Yugoslavia	1980–1982	
Rose Tattoo	Australia	1976–1987, 1993, 1998–present	
Uli Jon Roth	Germany	1968–present	
Rough Cutt	United States	1981–1987, 2000–2002	
The Runaways	United States	1975–1979	
Running Wild	Germany	1976–2009, 2011–present	
Rush	Canada	1968–present	
Saber Tiger	Japan	1981–present	
Sacred Rite	United States	1980–1990	
Saint	United States	1980–1989, 1999–present	
Saint Vitus	United States	1978–1996, 2003, 2008–present	
Salem	United Kingdom	1979–1983, 2009–present	
Samson	United Kingdom	1977–2002	
Sarcofagus	Finland	1977-2020	
Satan	United Kingdom	1979–1988, 2005–present	
Savage	United Kingdom	1976–present	
Savage Grace	United States	1981–1993, 2009–2010	
Savatage	United States	1978–2002, 2014–present	Previous members of the band formed the Trans-Siberian Orchestra in 1996.
Saxon	United Kingdom	1976–present	
Michael Schenker Group	Germany	1979–present	
Scorpions	Germany	1965–present	
Seduce	United States	1980–1991, 2002–2005, 2008, 2011, 2016–present	
Shark Island	United States	1979–1992	
Sir Lord Baltimore	United States	1968–1976, 2006–2015	
Sister	United States	1976–1978	
Skitzo	United States	1981–present	
Slayer	United States	1981-2019, 2024—present	
Sorcery	United States	1976–1987	
Sortilège	France	1981–1986	
Sound Barrier	United States	1980–1987	
Spider	United Kingdom	1976–1986	
Spinal Tap	United States	1979–present	Parody heavy metal band which first appeared on TV in 1979, with American actors playing the parts of fictional British musicians.
Stampede	United Kingdom	1981–1983, 2009–present	
Starz	United States	1975–1979, 1980, 1990, 2003–present	
Steeler	Germany	1981–1988	
Steppenwolf	United States	1967–2018	The 1967 recording "Born to Be Wild" was one of the first rock songs to contain the phrase "Heavy Metal" in its lyrics.
The Stooges	United States	1967-1971, 1972-1974, 2003–2016	
Stormwitch	Germany	1979–1994, 2002–present	
Stray	United Kingdom	1966–present	
Suck	South Africa	1970–1971	
Suicidal Tendencies	United States	1980–1995, 1997–present	
Sweet Savage	United Kingdom	1979–present	
Tank	United Kingdom	1980–1989, 1997–present	
Tarantula	Portugal	1981–present	
Tesla	United States	1981–1996, 2000–present	
Thin Lizzy	Ireland	1969–1984, 1996–2012	
Thor	Canada	1976–1978, 1983–1986, 1997–present	
TKO	United States	1977–2001	
Toad	Switzerland	1970–1995	
Tobruk	United Kingdom	1981–1987	
Törr	Czechoslovakia	1977–present	
Trance	Germany	1977–1998, 2011–present	According to Manfred Meyer of Metal Hammer magazine, some would rank the band alongside Accept and Scorpions as the third most important hard rock band from Germany.
Trespass	United Kingdom	1978–1982, 1992–1993, 2013–present	
Triumph	Canada	1975–1993, 2008–present	
Trooper	Canada	1974–present	
Trouble	United States	1979–present	
Trust	France	1977–1985, 1988, 1996–2000, 2006	
Truth and Janey	United States	1969-1976, 1977-1978	
TSA	Poland	1979–present	
T.S.O.L.	United States	1978-2006, 2007–present	
Tucky Buzzard	United Kingdom	1969–1974	
Turbo	Poland	1980–present	
Twisted Sister	United States	1972–1988, 1997–2016	
Tygers of Pan Tang	United Kingdom	1978–1987, 1999–present	
Tytan	United Kingdom	1981–1983, 2012–present	
UFO	United Kingdom	1969–1988, 1992–2024	
Urchin	United Kingdom	1972–1980	
Uriah Heep	United Kingdom	1969–present	
V8	Argentina	1979–1987	
Vandenberg	Netherlands	1981–1987, 2020–present	
Van Halen	United States	1972–2020	Van Halen's combination of hard rock, heavy metal, and pop elements helped to popularize and mainstream the genre of hard rock music, and is known for changing the way we play guitar. The band disbanded in 2020 following Eddie Van Halen's death.
Vanilla Fudge	United States	1967–1970, 1982–1984, 1987–1988, 1991, 1999–present	
Vardis	United Kingdom	1973–1986, 2014–present	
Vatreni Poljubac	Yugoslavia / Bosnia and Herzegovina	1977–1986, 1998–2001, 2010–present	
Venom	United Kingdom	1979–present	Pioneers of the black metal genre, with their 1981 album Black Metal and subsequent releases.
Vicious Rumors	United States	1979–present	
Virgin Steele	United States	1981–present	
Vixen	United States	1980–1992, 1997–1998, 2001–present	
Vulcain	France	1981–1998, 2009–present	
Warlord	United States	1980–1986, 2002, 2011–present	
Warning	France	1980–1985	
Warpig	Canada	1968–1975, 2004–present	
White Sister	United States	1980–1986, 2008–2009	
Whitesnake	United Kingdom	1978–1990, 1994, 1997, 2002–2025	
White Spirit	United Kingdom	1975–1981, 2022–2024	
White Wolf	Canada	1975–1986, 2007–present	
Wild Dogs	United States	1981–present	
Wild Horses	United Kingdom	1978–1981	
Witchfinder General	United Kingdom	1979–1984, 2006–2008	
Witchfynde	United Kingdom	1974–1984, 1999–present	
Wrathchild	United Kingdom	1980–1990, 2009–present	
Wrathchild America	United States	1978–1993	
Y&T	United States	1974–1991, 1995–present	
Zebra	United States	1975–present	
Zoetrope	United States	1976–1993	

== See also ==
- Heavy metal genres
- List of alternative metal bands
- List of black metal bands
- List of Celtic metal bands
- List of Christian metal bands
- List of crust punk bands
- List of death metal bands
- List of deathcore bands
- List of doom metal bands
- List of folk metal bands
- List of glam metal bands and artists
- List of gothic metal bands
- List of grindcore bands
- List of groove metal bands
- List of hardcore punk bands
- List of hard rock bands (A–M)
- List of hard rock bands (N–Z)
- List of industrial metal bands
- List of mathcore bands
- List of melodic death metal bands
- List of metalcore bands
- List of nu metal bands
- List of new wave of American heavy metal bands
- List of new wave of British heavy metal bands
- List of power metal bands
- List of progressive metal bands
- List of sludge metal bands
- List of speed metal bands
- List of symphonic black metal bands
- List of symphonic metal bands
- List of thrash metal bands
- List of Viking metal bands

== Gallery ==
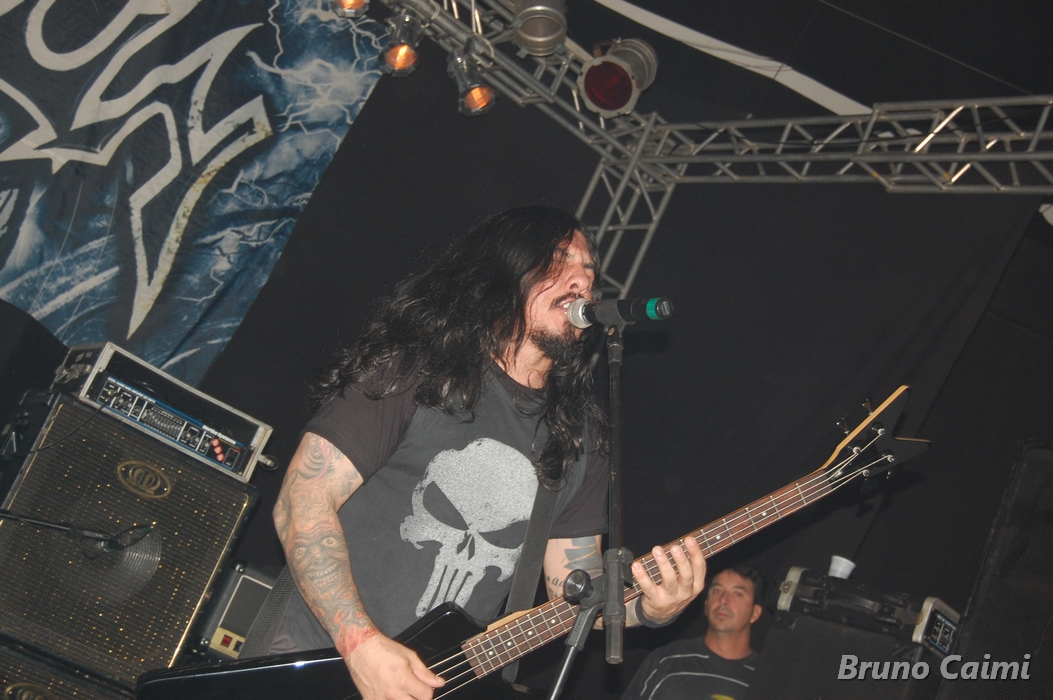
Krisiun

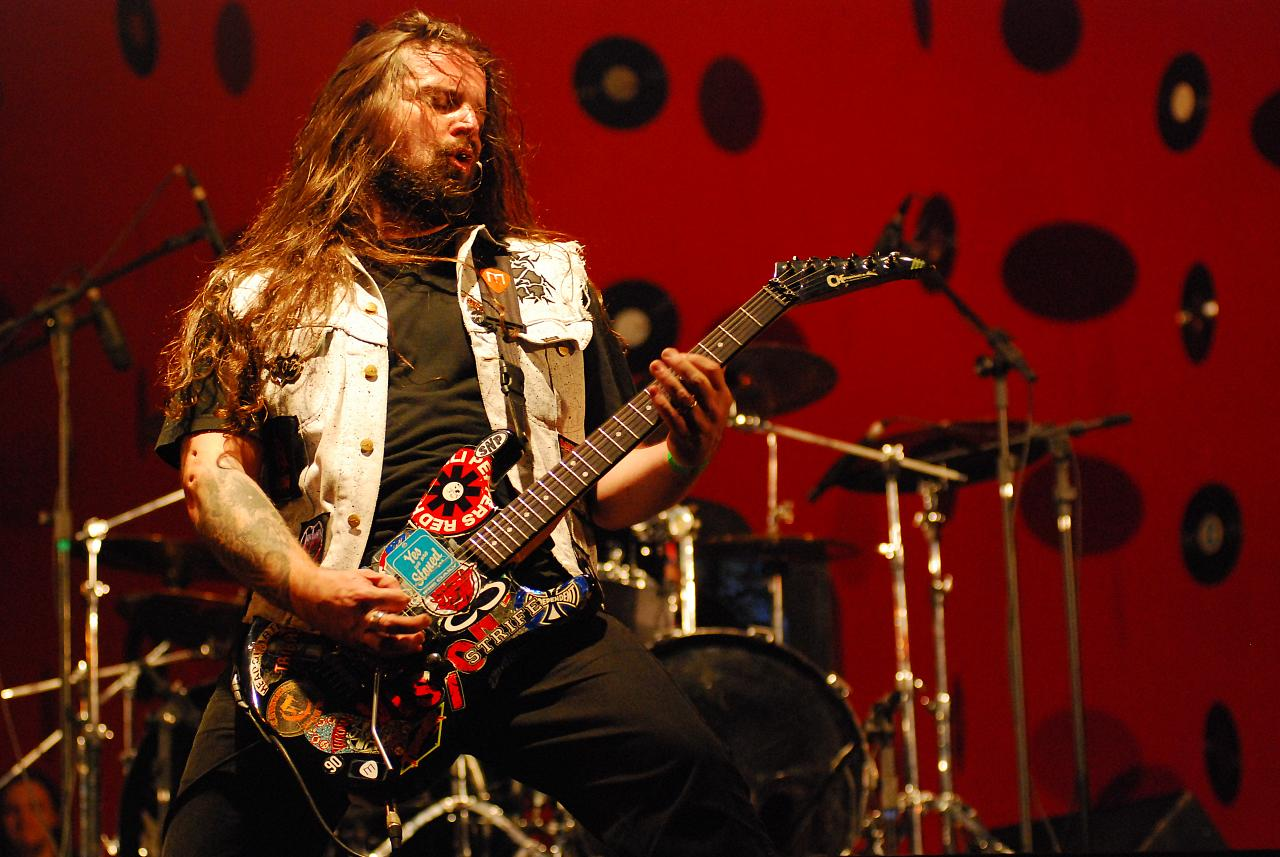
Sepultura – Andreas Kisser

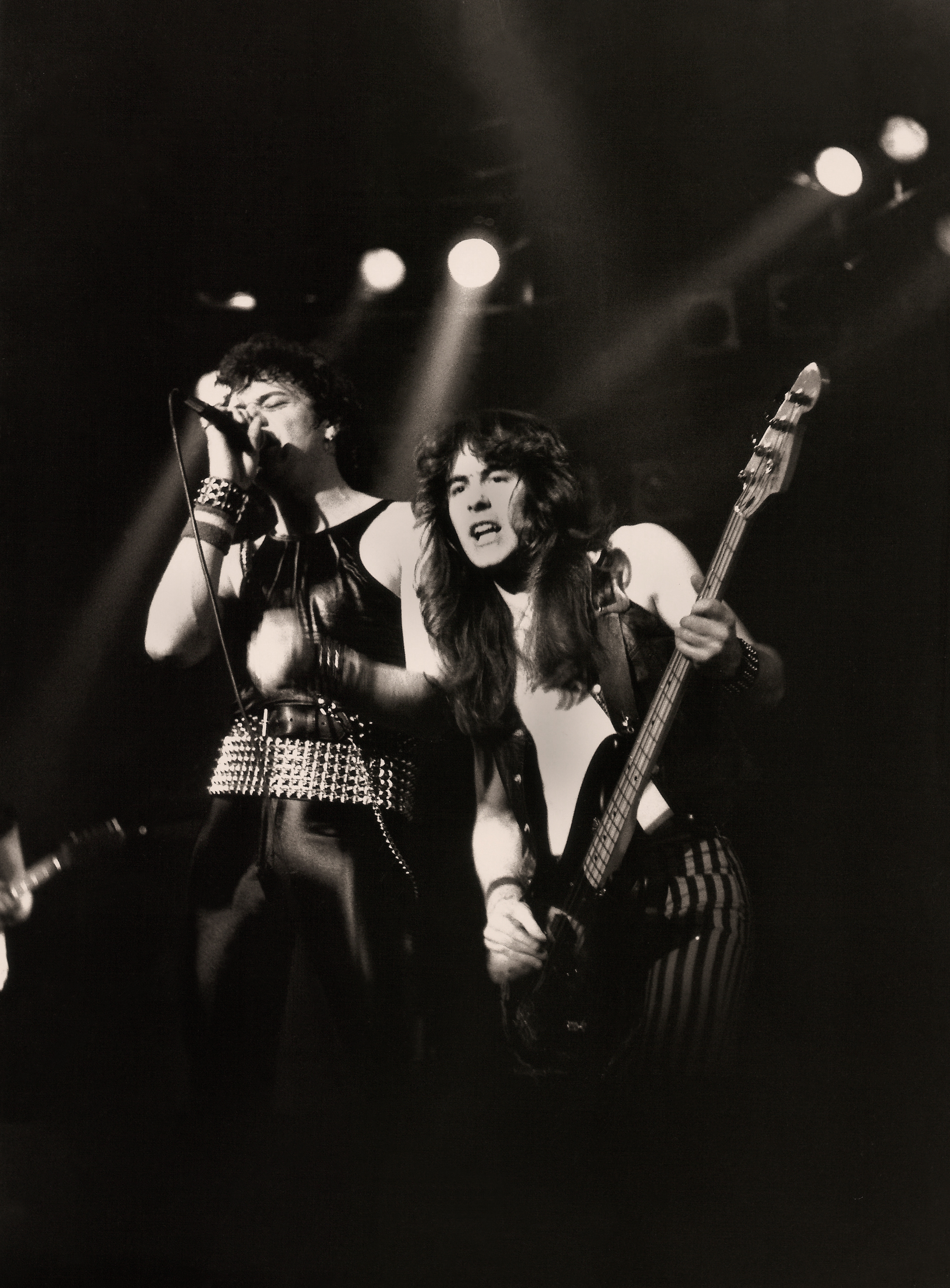
IRON MAIDEN – Manchester Apollo – 1980

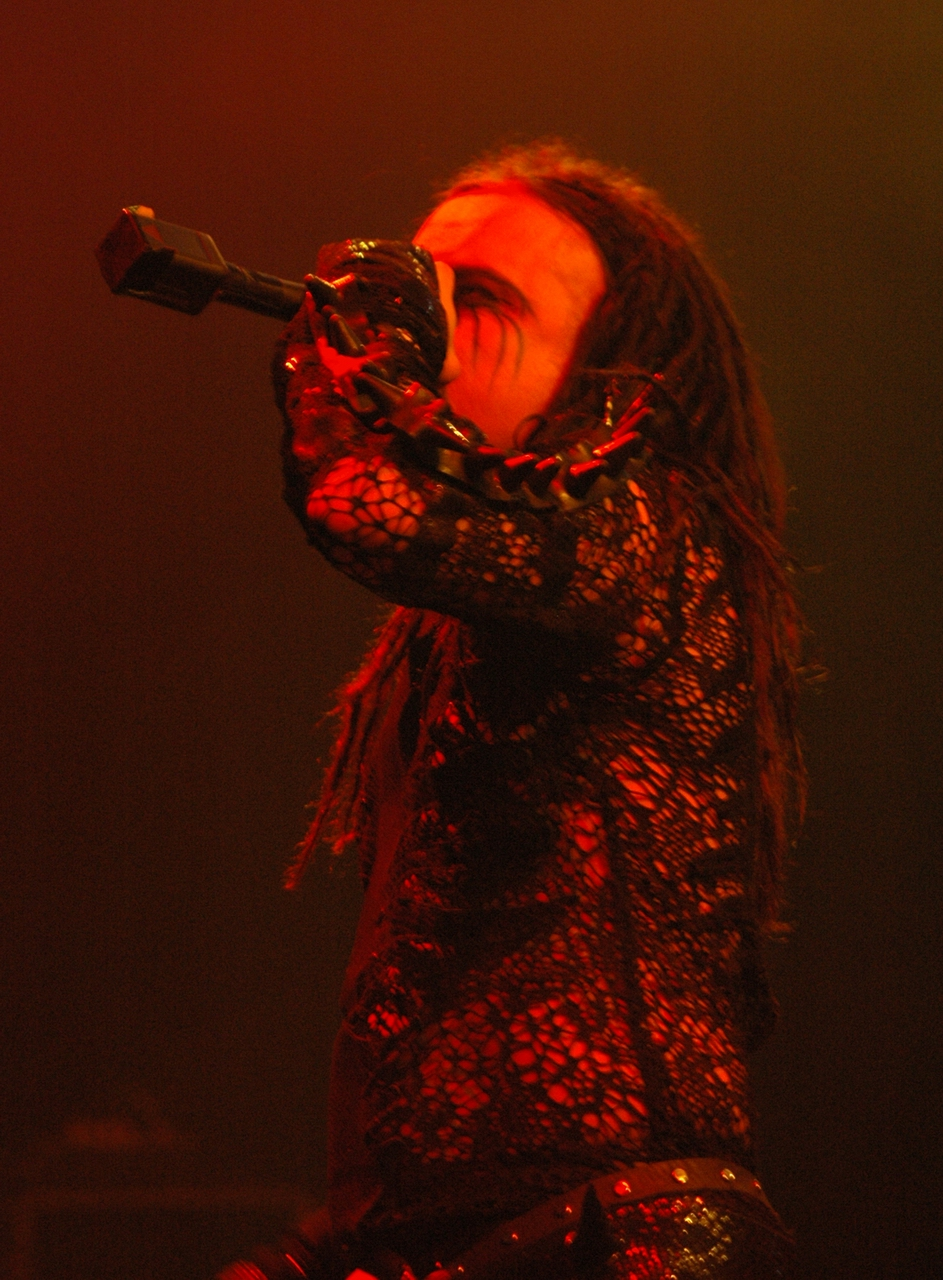
Cradle of Filth 2005 – Daniel (Dani Filth)

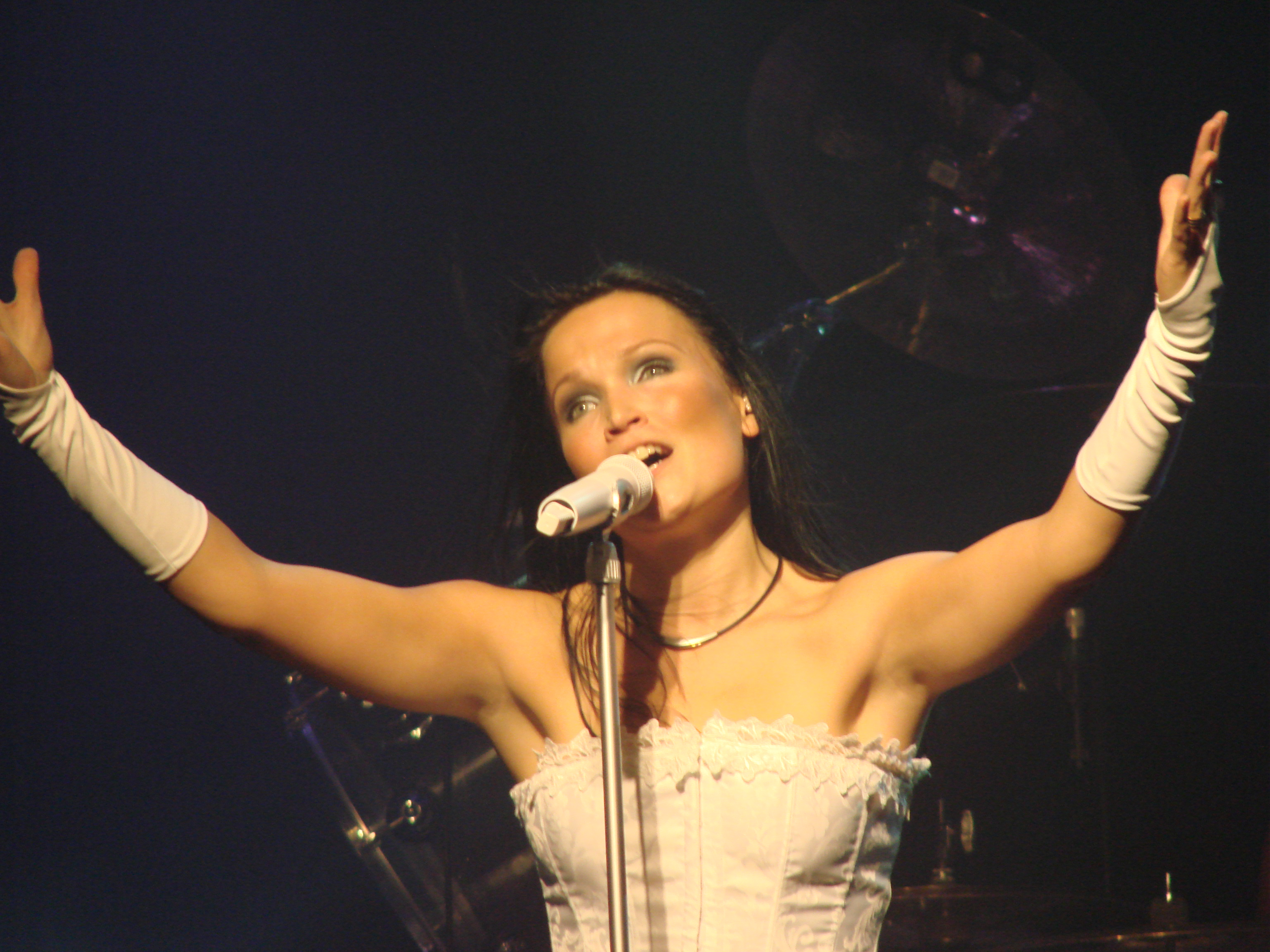
Nightwish – Tarja Turunen at Obras Stadium 2008

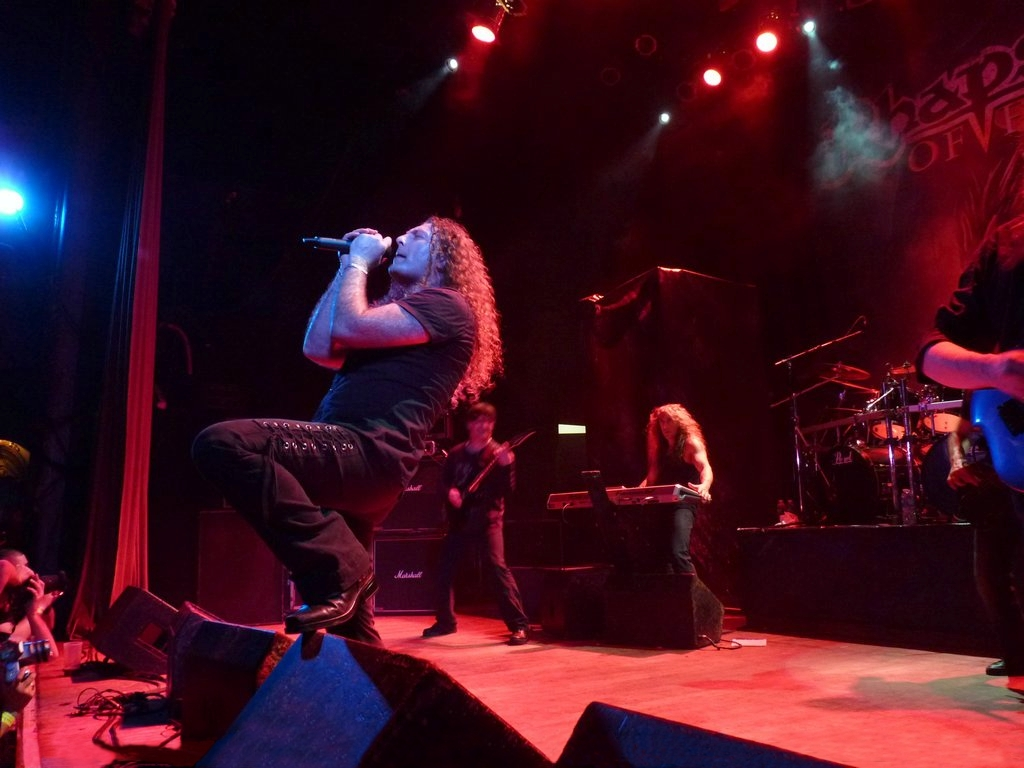
Rhapsody of Fire – Buenos Aires 2010

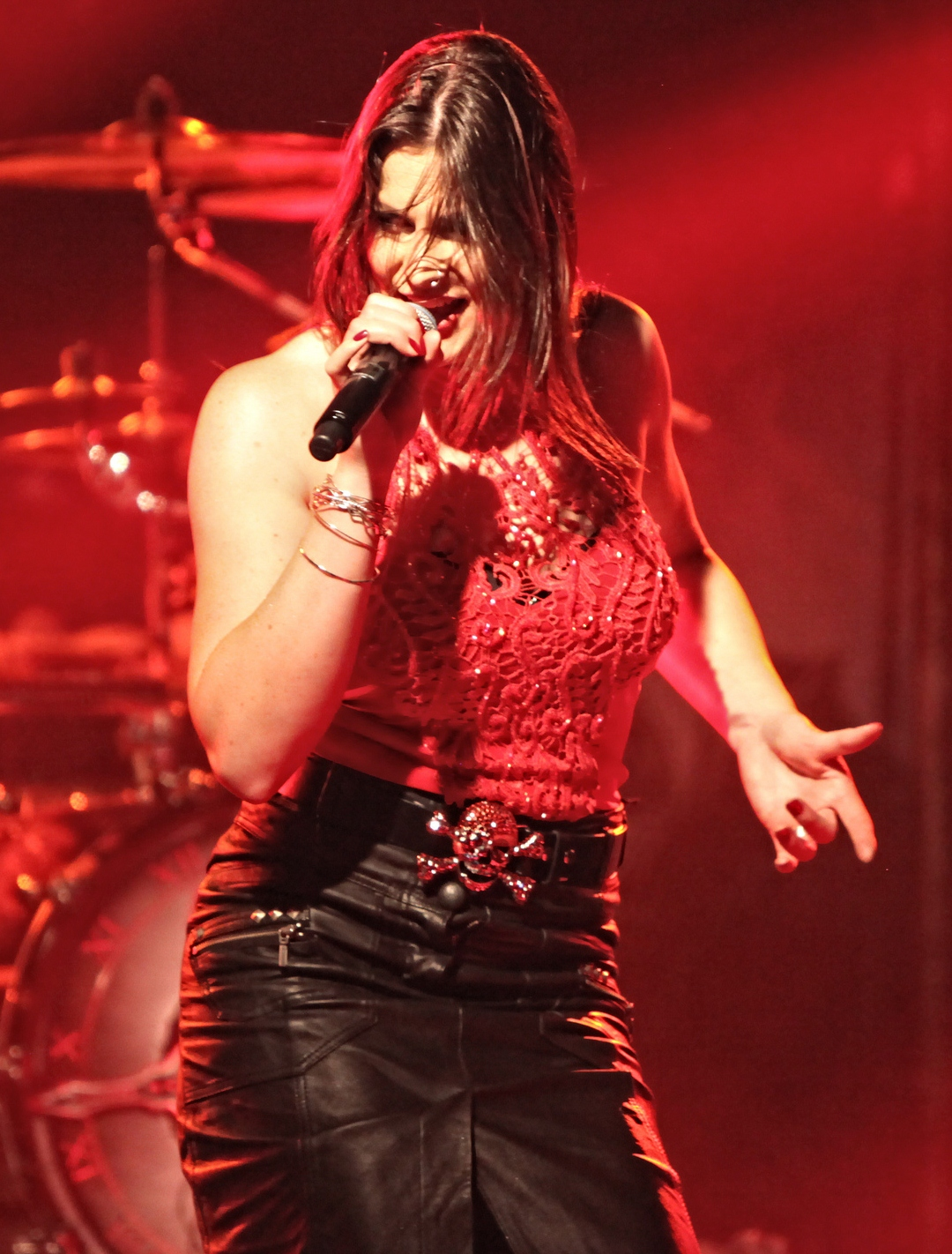
Floor Jansen – After Forever

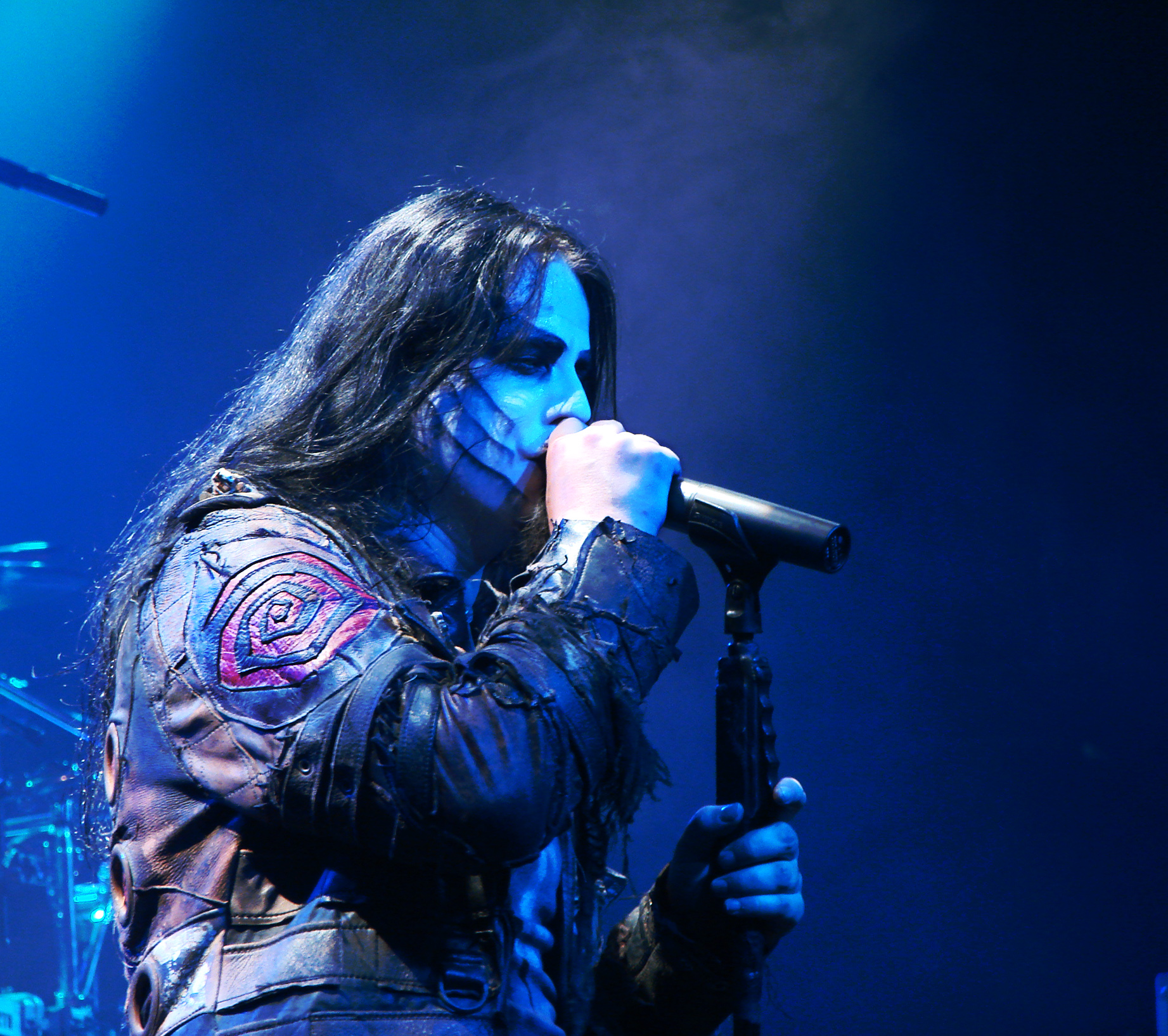
Dimmu Borgir – Paris

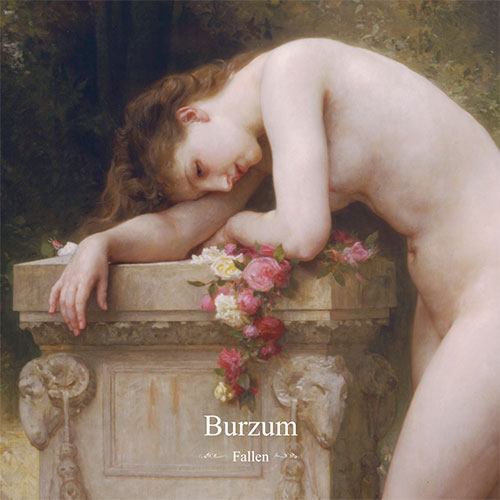
Burzum – Fallen

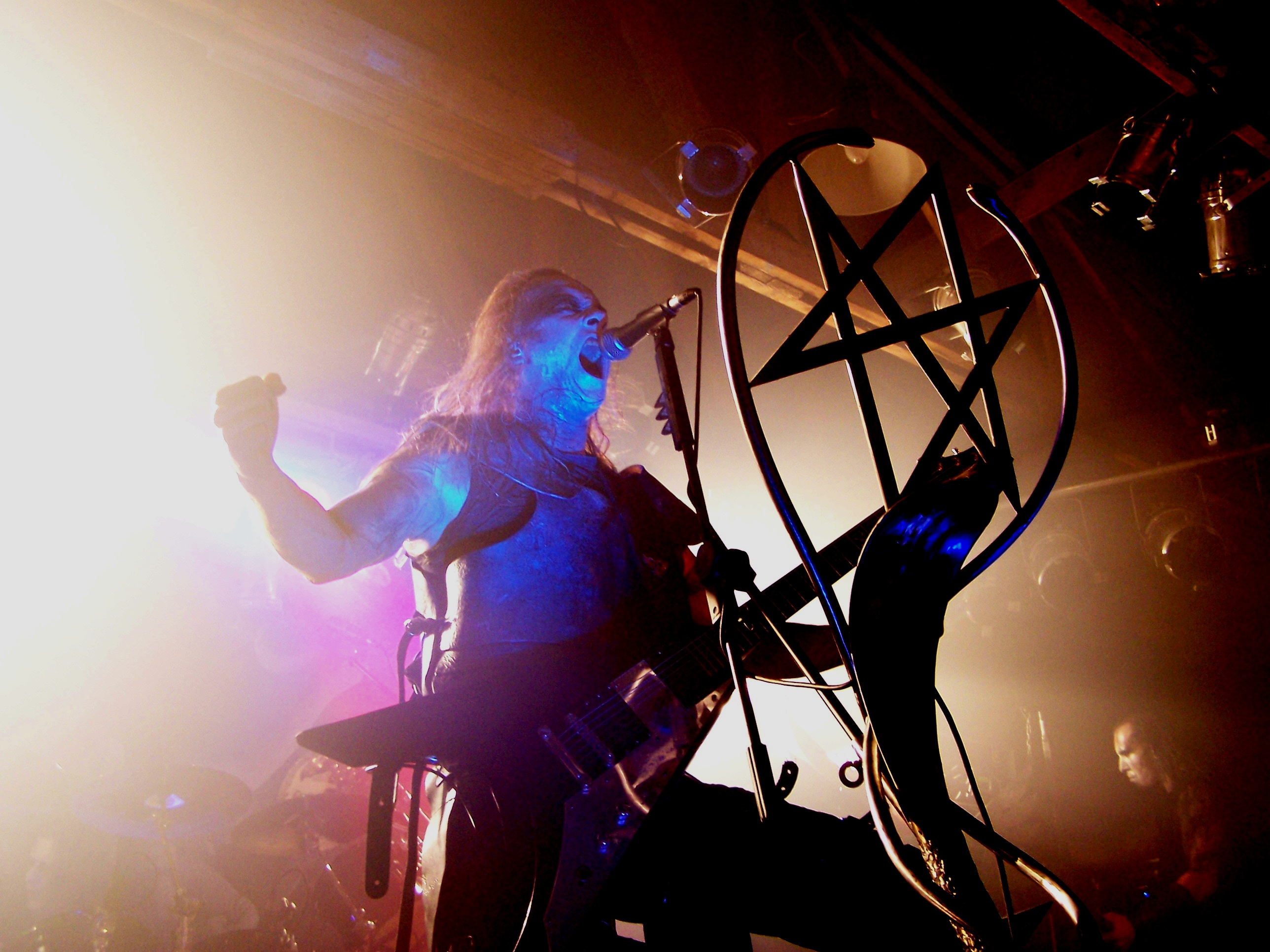
Behemoth – Adam Darski

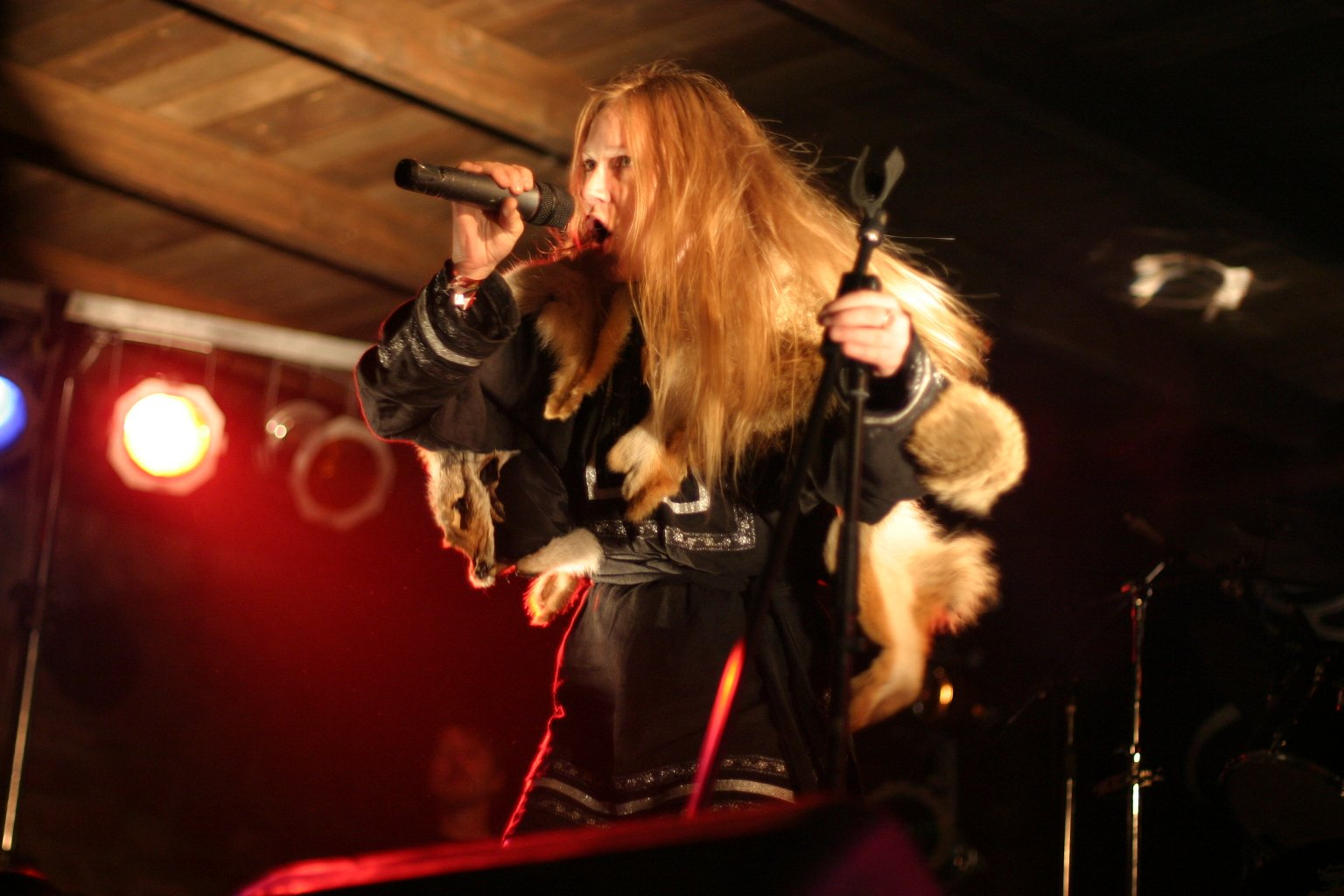
Arkona @ Black Troll 2010 XXVII

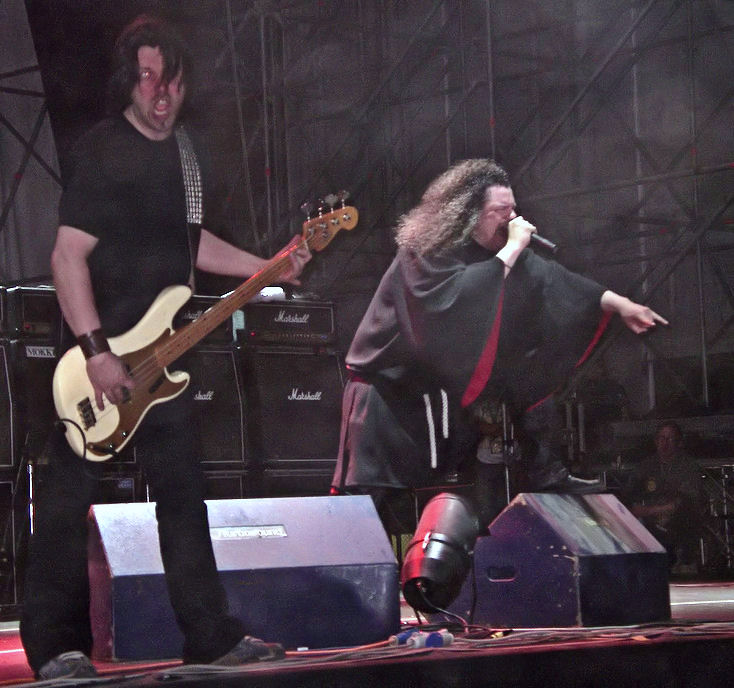
Candlemass – Leif and Messiah

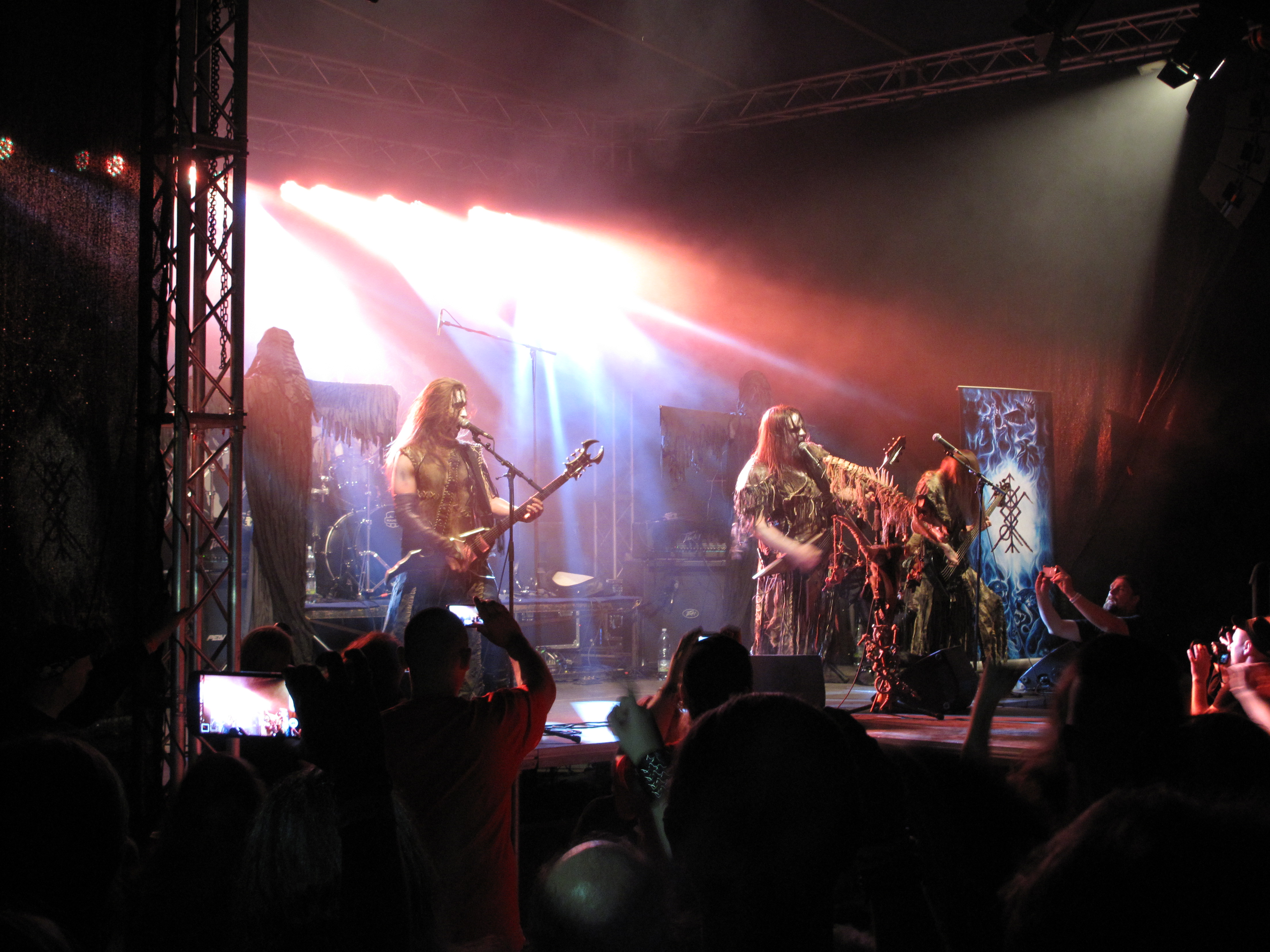
Nokturnal Mortum

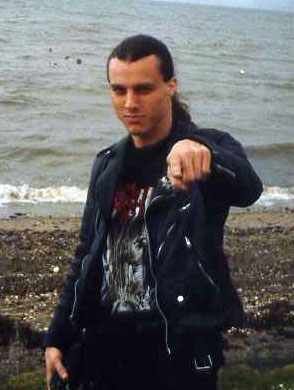
Chuck Schuldiner – Death

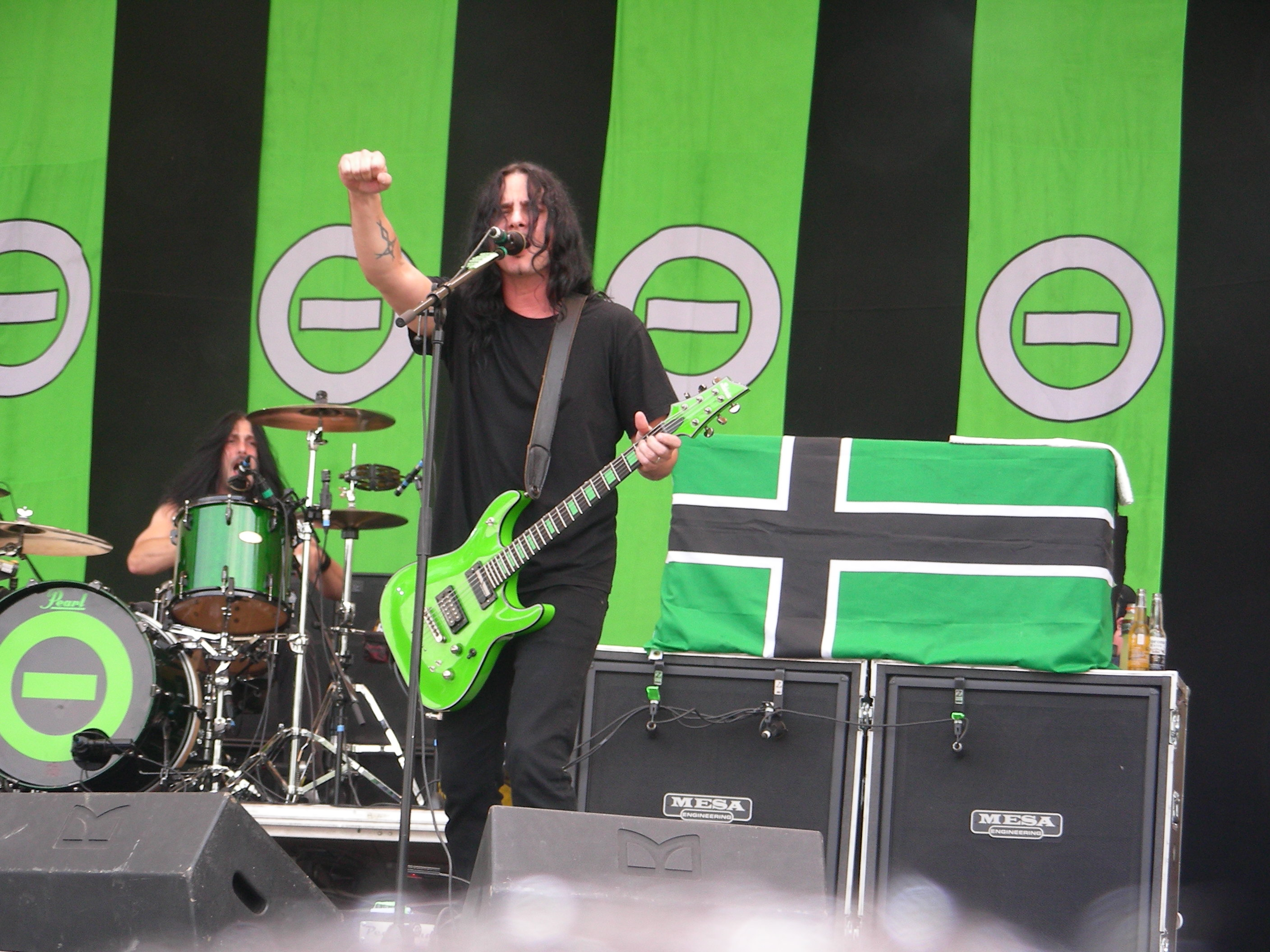
Type O Negative
