= Metal for Muthas =

Metal for Muthas Volumes I & II

Compilation album by Various Artists
- Released: 8 February 1980
- Recorded: 1979
- Genre: Heavy metal, hard rock
- Length: 40:50 (vol. I), 43:38 (vol. II)
- Label: EMI (LP version), Sanctuary Records (CD reissue)
- Producer: Ashley Goodall EMI A&R
- Compiler: Neal Kay

Vol. II cover

Professional ratings
Review scores
Source	Rating
(Vol. I) AllMusic	3/5 stars
(Vol. II) AllMusic	3/5 stars
Record Mirror	4/5 stars
(Vol. I) Sounds	2/5 stars

Metal for Muthas is the name given to a series of heavy metal compilations made during the new wave of British heavy metal (NWOBHM).

The original compilation was Metal for Muthas, released in February 1980. The compilation was a sampling of various better-known artists of the NWOBHM, primarily known for having some of the earliest recorded material by heavy metal legends Iron Maiden. The original Metal for Muthas album reached No. 12 on the British LP charts and became the basis of a tour by the artists who contributed songs to the compilation. Iron Maiden, who headlined the tour, became largely intertwined with the history of Sanctuary Records (whose namesake was the similarly named Iron Maiden track on the compilation).

Metal For Muthas was followed by a second similar compilation, Metal for Muthas Volume II. The compilation featured less notable artists of the NWOBHM but is also reminiscent of the DIY ethic of the late 1970s and early 1980s British heavy metal underground scene.

Also released in 1980 on EMI as part of the same series was a four-track compilation EP entitled Muthas Pride (12EMI5074).

The brand name was resurrected in the early 1990s by DJ Neal Kay, who produced a compilation entitled Metal for Muthas '92, featuring unsigned British hard rock acts. The album gained a Japan-only release on the Pony Canyon label (PCCY-00392).

== Track listing ==
=== Volume I ===
1. Iron Maiden - "Sanctuary" - 3:32
2. Sledgehammer - "Sledgehammer" - 3:10
3. E. F. Band - "Fighting for Rock and Roll" - 3:34
4. Toad the Wet Sprocket - "Blues in A" - 3:44
5. Praying Mantis - "Captured City" - 5:31
6. Ethel the Frog - "Fight Back" - 2:49
7. Angel Witch - "Baphomet" - 4:58
8. Iron Maiden - "Wrathchild" - 3:10
9. Samson - "Tomorrow or Yesterday" - 5:31
10. Nutz - "Bootliggers" - 4:41

"Blues in A" was performed by Toad the Wet Sprocket, a British blues-metal band that had no connection with the later American alternative rock band of the same name. The two bands took their name from a sketch that appeared on Monty Python's Contractual Obligation Album. Ethel the Frog also took their name from a Monty Python sketch about Doug & Dinsdale Pirhana.

=== Volume II ===
1. Trespass - "One of These Days" - 3:49
2. Eazy Money - "Telephone Man" - 5:22
3. Xero - "Cutting Loose" - 4:27
4. White Spirit - "High upon High" - 4:34
5. Dark Star - "Lady of Mars" - 4:29
6. Horsepower - "You Give Me Candy" - 4:39
7. Red Alert - "Open Heart" - 2:40
8. Chevy - "Chevy" - 4:39
9. The Raid - "Hard Lines" - 3:38
10. Trespass - "Storm Child" - 5:21

=== Muthas Pride ===
1. Wildfire - "Wild Dogs" - 3:20
2. Quartz - "Back in the Band" - 2:49
3. White Spirit - "Red Skies" - 5:01
4. Baby Jane - "Baby" - 2:22

=== Metal For Muthas '92 ===
1. Gangland - "Beyond the Law" - 4:08
2. Savannah Nix - "Love's Last Shot" - 3:33
3. L.O. Girls - "Big Rock" - 2:59
4. Dynamite Inc. - "Shark" - 3:06
5. Flight 19 - "Liar" - 3:52
6. Crazy Angel - "Daddy's Girl" - 3:39
7. St. Hellier - "Living in Fear" - 3:55
8. Pete Wadeson Band - "Thrill of the Chase" - 3:58
9. L.O. Girls - "Love Injection" - 2:37
10. Flight 19 - "Flame" - 4:14
11. Savannah Nix - "Free my State of Mind" - 4:59
12. Hardland - "Hammerfall" - 3:24
13. Gangland - "Death Threat" - 3:07
14. Bad Influence - "Life Goes On" - 5:10
15. Quick Shimmy - "Quick Shimmy" - 3:49
