= Dragonslayer (band) =

English heavy metal band

- Origin: Lancashire, England
- Genre: Heavy metal
- Years active: 1978-1980 (as Heavy Thunder); 1980-1983 (as Slayer); 1983-1987; 2013-2015 (as Dragonslayer)
- Label: Cavalier Records
- Members: Steve Morgan, Bass; Phil Odins, Guitars; Tony Mamwell, Vocals; Dave Phillips, Drums

Dragonslayer was an English heavy metal band from Lancashire, formed in 1978 as Heavy Thunder. They are a respected band from the new wave of British heavy metal period who settled on the name Slayer in 1980, meaning (as with S.A. Slayer) they had to change their title to Dragonslayer to avoid confusion with the thrash band Slayer from Los Angeles, who released their debut album Show No Mercy worldwide on 3 December 1983. They can be described as early Power Metal, sharing classic rock influences with and fantasy-themed lyrics with other N.W.O.B.H.M. bands from the West Midlands such as Tyrant, Cynic, Grim Reaper and Arc.

== Biography ==
The band initially formed in 1978 as Heavy Thunder. As they started to play more heroic fantasy-themed songs, they changed their name to Slayer on moving to Rochdale, Greater Manchester in 1980, developing a good live reputation and recording a five-track demo at Cargo Studios, which was produced by Colin Richardson who would later find fame producing bands such as Fear Factory and Machine Head. In late 1983, the "I Want Your Life" EP was recorded at Cavalier Studios in Stockport. However, following the pressing and just before the single's release, Slayer from Los Angeles released their debut, so the band chose to rebrand themselves as Dragonslayer. Stickers were placed over the EP labels with their new logo, although these were thin so the original label could still be seen through.

The single was well-received, and they continued to play headline local shows, even supporting Tractor for a number of dates. The band looked for a record deal throughout 1984 and 1985, choosing to record another 7 track demo early in 1986 to keep the band pushing forward. Following this recording bassist Steve Morgan decided to leave the band and was replaced by Marc Webb, formerly of a band called Voltage. With this lineup, they recorded the track "Rock the Radio" for an Ebony Records compilation called "The Metal Collection Vol. II". They played some farewell gigs then split up in mid-1987. Strangely, the only member who kept playing in bands was guitarist Phil Odins.

In 2008 a compilation of most of their recorded material was issued by Shadow Kingdom Records. Following this successful reissue, the band started rehearsing again and posting on Facebook in 2013, announcing they were writing new songs and planning to play live again. However, after not posting for a while in 2016, they announced "the Dragon still sleeps for now".

The compilation does not feature the track 'Rock the Radio' from the 1987 Ebony Records compilation The Metal Collection Volume II.

== Musical style ==
Dragonslayer is best described as a new wave of British heavy metal band, playing proto-power metal.

== Band members ==
- Tony Mamwell - vocals (1978–1987)
- Phil Odins - guitars (1978–1987)
- Dave Phillips - drums (1978–1987)
- Steve Morgan - bass (1978–1986)
- Marc Webb - bass (1986–1987)

== Discography ==
=== EPs ===
- I Want Your Life (1983)

=== Compilation albums ===
- The Metal Collection - Volume II (1987) with the song "Rock the Radio"

== See also ==
- List of new wave of British heavy metal bands
