= Charlie 'Ungry =

British rock band

- Origin: United Kingdom
- Genres: Punk rock, NWOBHM
- Years active: 1977–1980
- Labels: NWOBHM Obscure Releases Records, Rave Up Records, Hozac Records

Charlie 'Ungry is a British rock band that existed in 1977–1980. The context for its music is defined by the new wave of British heavy metal and punk rock, which are characterised by raw sound and low-budget productions. In 2004, retrospective CD by Charlie’ Ungry, The Chester Road Album, was released.

== History ==
=== 1977–1980 ===
In the Spring of 1977, Four local musicians from Enfield North London got together to perform songs written by Jeff Gibbs (Bass and Vocals) and the lead singer Tony Sando.

With Andy Demetriou on Drums and Steve Protheroe on lead guitar. Over 12 songs had already been written ready to be recorded. And after just two months in May 77 they had recorded a demo of three songs in Tom Newman ‘s (Tubular Bells/Mike Oldfield) recording studio in Maida Vale. After hearing the original recordings, Tom invited the band back to do another demo over two days in August 1977, but this time the aim was to record all the 12 songs live with a few overdubs.

The sound Charlie ‘Ungry had created was raw and explosive, and the interest in the recordings led to the band doing a showcase gig at the prestigious Greyhound, a famous rock music venue in Fulham Palace Road London. Record companies A&R representatives watched Charlie Ungry perform on a quiet Monday night to a sparse crowd and although going down well they heard no more. Disenchanted they the band split in November 1977 after just seven months.

In 1980 Andy Demetriou and Tony Sando still believing in the Charlie 'Ungry sound thought they would try to develop interest again with a three-song vinyl (EP) aptly named Charlie Ungry. The EP was sent out to Radio stations and record companies to see if there was any interest. DJ Alan Freeman who had a rock show on Capital Radio at that time played Who is my Killer. The EP showed well in the independent record market, and with Jeff Gibbs back on board, two new songs were recorded with a new lead guitarist Tony Nurse. After just a few months with no positive feedback the musicians of Charlie 'Ungry decided to go their own way. Charlie Ungry was effectively archived by all or, so they had thought.

=== 2000s ===
In 2004 twelve songs created by Charlie' Ungry in 1977 and two compositions from 1980 were compiled for a CD called The Chester Road Album. The album was released on a NWOBM compilation CD made by Obscure Records, which is based in Greece (creator – George Arvanitakis).

Andy Demetriou also created a Charlie Ungry official website which promotes the band with many tracks featured on YouTube. In 2013 an Italian record company Rave Up Records released 10 of the tracks from the CD on a 12” Vinyl. In 2016 Hozac Records from Chicago, USA released a three-song vinyl EP without remastering.

== Members ==
- Tony Sando (vocal)
- Jeff Gibbs (bass & vocal)
- Andy Demetriou (drums)
- Steve Protheroe (guitars)
- Tony Nurse (guitars)

== Discography ==
=== Vinyl 7” EP (1980). Charlie ‘Ungry Records. UK. ===
- Who is My Killer? (Gibbs)
- House On Chester Road (Gibbs)
- Preacher (Sando)

=== CD Album The Chester Road Album (2004). NWOBHM Obscure Releases Records. Greece. ===
- Who’s My Killer (Gibbs)
- Sometimes I Go Out Of My Mind (Sando)
- Try It Again (Gibbs/Sando)
- Where Are You Now, Christina? (Gibbs)
- House On Chester Road (Gibbs)
- To Get Back Home (Gibbs)
- We’re Gonna Ride (Sando)
- Digby Rising (Gibbs)
- Preacher (Sando)
- Time To Go (Gibbs)
- Keep The Peace (Sando)
- Memories (Sando)
- Let It Ride (Gibbs)
- Poor Boy’s Blues (Sando)

=== Vinyl 12” Album The Chester Road Album (2013). Rave Up Records. Italy. ===
Side 1:

- Who Is My Killer (Gibbs)
- Sometimes Go Out Of My Mind (Sando)
- Try It Again (Gibbs/Sando)
- House On Chester Road (Gibbs)
- To Get Back Home (Gibbs)

Side 2:

- Digby Rising (Gibbs)
- Feel Like A Preacher (Sando)
- Keep The Peace (Sando)
- Memories (Sando)
- Let It Ride (Gibbs)

=== Vinyl 7” EP (2016). Hozac Records. United States. ===
- Who Is My Killer? (Gibbs)
- Time To Go (Gibbs)
- House On Chester Road (Gibbs)

== See also ==
- List of new wave of British heavy metal bands

== Sources ==
- Christe, Ian (2004). Sound of the Beast: The Complete Headbanging History of Heavy Metal. New York City: HarperCollins. ISBN 978-0-380-81127-4.
