= Jameson Raid (band) =

British heavy metal band

- Also known as: Notre Dame (1975); The Raid (1983)
- Origin: Birmingham, England
- Genres: Heavy metal, hard rock
- Years active: 1975–1983, 2008–present
- Label: Shadow Kingdom Records
- Members: Terry Dark; Eric "Kalli" Kaldschmidt; Andreas "Neudi" Neuderth; Luud Tilly
- Past members: Ian Smith; Terry Dark; John Ace; Phil Kimberly; Mike Darby; Peter Green; James Barrett; Steve Makin; Roger Simms Stewart Harrod
- Website: http://www.jamesonraid.eu

Jameson Raid are a British heavy metal band. They are usually considered to be part of the new wave of British heavy metal, following their inclusion on EMI's album Metal For Muthas II, although they were established on the Birmingham circuit as a hard rock band several years before this.

== Career ==
The band can originally be dated back to 1973, when bassist John Ace and guitarist Ian Smith, played together in Spectaté II at the school they attended in Sutton Coldfield. The band members went their separate ways to go to university – aside from Smith who went to sea – at which point Ace formed a covers outfit. When this split, Ace, together with rhythm guitarist Stewart Harrod, persuaded Smith to return and added the drummer Phil Kimberley. Their first gig took place on 26 August 1975, under the generally disliked name Notre Dame. The name Jameson Raid comes from an incident in the Transvaal at the turn of 1895/96. Their roadie Nick Freeman was credited with recalling the event from his school history books and proposing it to the band. With Hoi Polloi singer Terry Dark joining in December 1976, and Stewart leaving a few days later, Jameson Raid's most well-known line-up was complete.

Jameson Raid released their first single, the "Seven Days of Splendour" EP in February 1979. "The combination of influences which had given birth to the band's overall sound was quite difficult to pin down, as there were elements of 70's rock/pop (particularly David Bowie and Mott The Hoople), heavier acts such as Thin Lizzy and the occasional nod towards punk snottiness..." noted author Malc Macmillan, and the three tracks on the EP ("Seven Days of Splendour", "It's a Crime" and "Catcher in the Rye") illustrated Macmillan's conundrum in terms of an inability to categorise the band's sound. Described in The International Encyclopedia of Hard Rock & Heavy Metal as "cult heroes for the Midland rock circuit... Their music is a poppy form of heavy metal...". The EP was well received and, as Martin Popoff pointed out, showcased "a masterful bit of songwriting throughout these three tracks". The first 1,000 copies came in a white sleeve, with a further pressing of 2,000 in a black sleeve; both featured what Popoff called "a spoofed band history" together with the lyrics to all three songs.

In March 1980 the band, along with Magnum, played support to Def Leppard at West Midland venues on the latter's On Through the Night World Tour.

In May 1980, EMI released the second of its Metal for Muthas NWOBHM compilation albums. Metal For Muthas II Cut Loud, featured the Jameson Raid track "Hard Lines", although the band were unhappy that EMI had, unbeknownst to them, completely remixed the song (which the band had already mixed to their satisfaction) and in doing so pretty much destroyed it. The band were credited as The Raid on this release.

Fighting against a tide of apathy, Smith and Ace handed in their notice and played their final gig with the band in Birmingham in July 1980. A second 7-inch EP, widely referred to as The Hypnotist but actually entitled End of Part One, was released at this time. Featuring four tracks ("The Hypnotist", "The Raid", "Getting Hotter" and "Straight from the Butchers"), the EP proved to be the band's vinyl swansong.

Kimberley and Dark soldiered on, recruiting guitarist Mike Darby and bassist Peter Green. In 1981 Darby left and was replaced by The Handsome Beasts founder member James Barrett, who in turn gave way to Steve Makin in 1982. The four-track Electric Sun demo cassette (featuring "Electric Sun", "Run for Cover", "Poor Little Rich Girl" and "Getting Hotter") was made available, but later that year Kimberley and Dark quit and the band was effectively over. During an interview for Classic Rock magazine in 2010, Terry Dark said: "We just seemed to be either a year too early, or a year too late... But whatever the reason things never quite happened for us." A green vinyl LP titled Jameson Raid, comprising the End Of Part One EP, the Electric Sun demo tracks, the Metal for Muthas take of "Hard Lines" and the unreleased track "Running Blind" from the final 1983 line-up was released as a bootleg and not an official release, although it has become an expensive collector's item. Both of the EPs featured in the 2010 edition of Record Collector.

In 1983, Green and Makin drafted in drummer Roger Simms, and with Makin handling both guitar and vocal duties, they tried to resurrect the band as The Raid, but with no great success nor longevity. Makin went on to front several other bands before being invited to appear on the solo album by Cozy Powell, The Drums Are Back (1992). He joined Slade in 1993.

Malcolm Dome wrote: "Jameson Raid are one of the many bands who were definitely contenders for glory during the halcyon days of the new wave of British heavy metal. Sadly, they never quite lived up to their obvious potential".

The classic line-up of Terry Dark, Ian Smith, John Ace and Phil Kimberley re-united in 2008, and their back catalogue album, Just as the Dust Had Settled, was released by Shadow Kingdom Records in March 2010. The band played gigs both in Germany and the UK in July 2010.

In February 2011 John Ace left the band. They played the Download festival in June 2011 with a stand in bass player before Peter Green, the bass player from 1980 to 1983, rejoined in June 2011. By 2012 first Ian Smith and then Phil Kimberley had followed John Ace and returned to their day jobs. They were replaced by Kalli Kaldschmidt and Andreas 'Neudi' Neuderth from the band Roxxcaliber. In August 2013 drummer Lars Wickett was recruited due to Neudi's live gig commitments with Manilla Road.

Jameson Raid have remained active particularly in Europe with occasional gigs in the UK.

== Members ==
=== Current lineup ===
- Terry Dark - vocals
- Kalli Kaldschmidt - guitar, vocals
- Andreas "Neudi" Neuderth - drums, vocals
- Luud Tilly - bass

=== Past members ===
June 1975

- John Ace - bass guitar, vocals
- Ian Smith - guitar, vocals
- Phil Kimberley - drums, vocals
- Stewart Harrod - rhythm guitar, vocals

December 1976 to July 1980

- John Ace - bass guitar
- Ian Smith - guitar
- Phil Kimberley - drums, vocals
- Terry Dark - vocals

1980 to 1981

- Terry Dark - vocals
- Mike Darby - guitar
- Peter Green - bass guitar
- Phil Kimberley - drums, vocals

1981

- Terry Dark - vocals
- James Barrett - guitar
- Peter Green - bass guitar
- Phil Kimberley - drums, vocals

1982

- Terry Dark - vocals
- Steve Makin - guitar
- Peter Green - bass guitar
- Phil Kimberley - drums, vocals

1983

- Steve Makin - guitar, vocals
- Peter Green - bass guitar
- Roger Simms - drums

2008 to Feb 2011

- Terry Dark - vocals
- Ian Smith - guitar, vocals
- John Ace - bass guitar, vocals
- Phil Kimberley - drums, vocals

2017

- Terry Dark - vocals
- Gavin Coulson - guitar, vocals
- Brendan O´Neil - drums
- Luud Tilly - bass

2018 till now

- Terry Dark - vocals
- Eric "Kalli" Kaldschmidt - guitar, vocals
- Andreas "Neudi" Neuderth - drums
- Luud Tilly - bass

== Discography ==
=== Albums ===
- Seven Days of Splendour EP (GBH Records, 1979)
- End of Part One EP (Blackbird Records, 1980)
- Just as the Dust Had Settled LP (Shadow Kingdom Records SKR030CD, March 2010)
- Just as the Dust Had Settled Limited Edition Vinyl LP (High Roller Records HR141, July 2010)
- Jameson Raid Live at the O2 Academy Limited Edition Vinyl LP (High Roller Records HR180, June 2011)
- The Beginning of Part II Limited Edition Vinyl LP (High Roller Records HRR220, September 2012)

=== Tracks on sampler albums ===
- Metal for Muthas II (EMI Records 1980) One Track, "Hard Lines".
- NWoBHM Vol. 2 (1992) One track, "It's a Crime".

=== Compilation albums ===
- Jameson Raid (Phoenix Records)

== See also ==
- List of new wave of British heavy metal bands
