= Ethel the Frog (band) =

British heavy metal band

Ethel the Frog was a heavy metal band formed in 1976 in Hull, England, and was part of the new wave of British heavy metal movement. The band's unusual name was taken from a Monty Python sketch about the "Piranha Brothers".

== Line-up ==
The original line-up was:

- Paul "Doug" Sheppard (lead guitar)
- Terry Hopkinson (vocals, bass)
- Paul Tognola (vocals, lead guitar)
- Paul Conyers (drums).

== Career ==
After building a local following, they released a heavy version of The Beatles song "Eleanor Rigby" in 1978. Ethel the Frog also contributed the song "Fight Back" to one of Neal Kay's Metal for Muthas compilations. In 1979, they signed a recording contract with EMI, which re-released the "Eleanor Rigby" single with "Fight Back" as the B-side.

Their self-titled debut album was released in 1980. A CD release on a small record label, British Steel, appeared in 1997.

== Post Ethel ==
Hopkinson, probably one of the very few early new wave metal bassists to play a six string Fender bass guitar, became a lecturer at the University of Leicester School of Archaeology.

Tognola and Conyers went on to join a band called Salem, releasing one single called "Reach for Eternity/Cold as Steel" in 1982. That band split in 1983, then reformed in 2009.

Doug Sheppard continued to play in cover bands, but then formed the band No Messiahs which has since dissolved. He continues to play guitar in the Netherlands and has several original songs issued on Reverbnation.

== Discography ==
- Metal for Muthas - Compilation (1980) EMI
- Ethel the Frog (1980) EMI

== See also ==
- List of new wave of British heavy metal bands
