= List of new wave of British heavy metal bands =

The mid-late 1970s – early 1980s period in the United Kingdom introduced a movement of young musicians, generally identified as the new wave of British heavy metal (often abbreviated as NWOBHM). The movement spawned more than a thousand hard rock and heavy metal bands from all over the UK, which were more or less forcibly identified as heavy metal acts. Most of those bands did not survive past the mid-1980s and disbanded, but many reformed in the 2000s.

== List of bands formed during the NWOBHM ==
=== A ===
- Alkatrazz

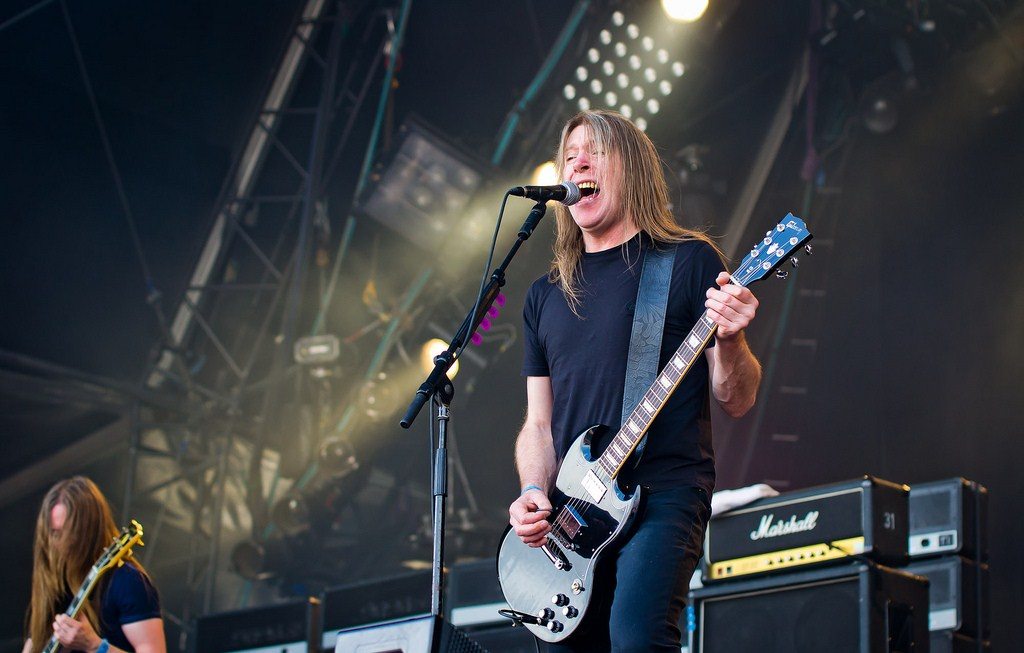
Angel Witch

- Angel Witch
- Atomkraft
- A II Z
- Avenger

=== B ===
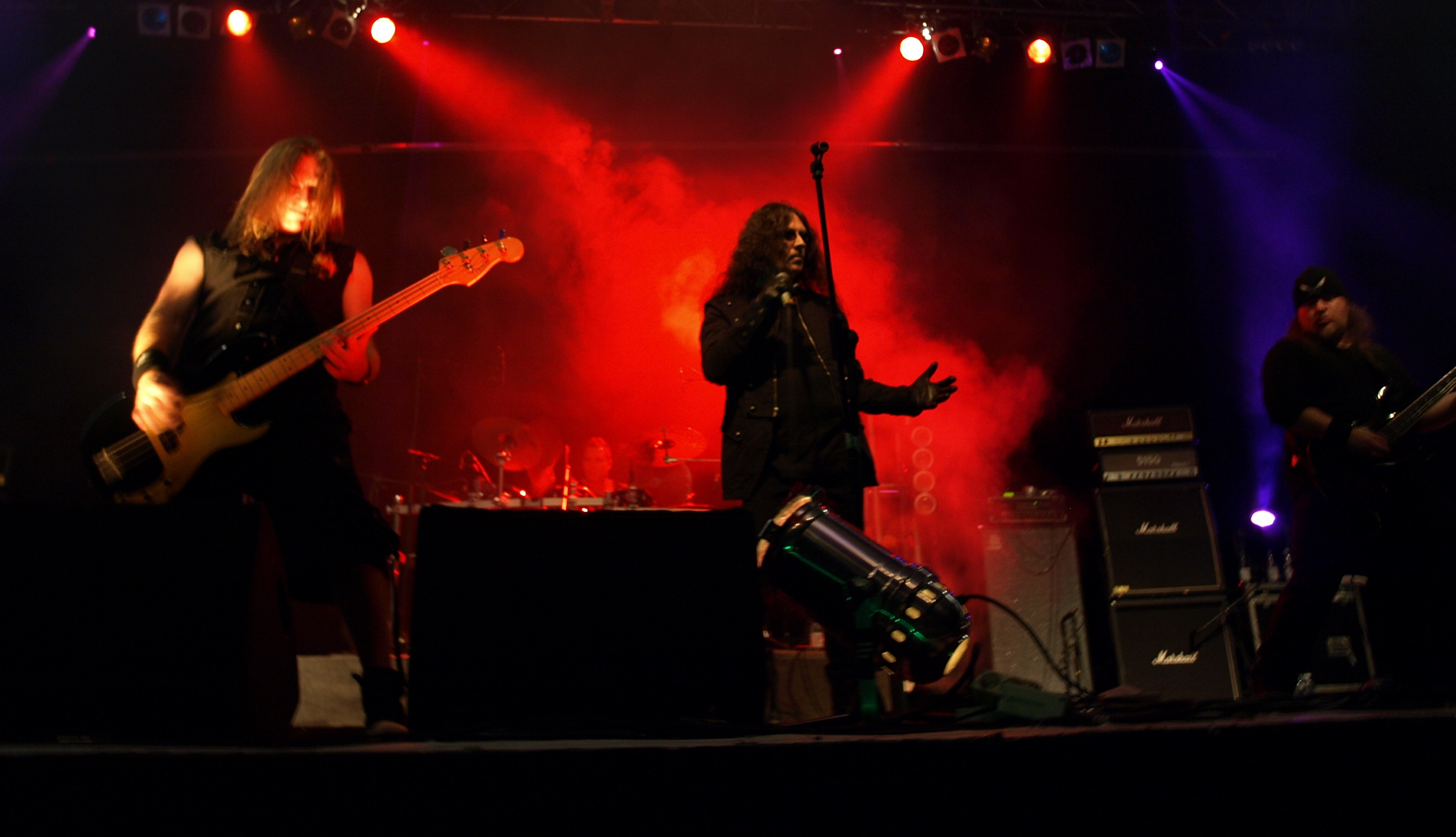
Blitzkrieg

- Baby Tuckoo
- Battleaxe
- Battlezone
- Black Rose
- Bleak House
- Blitzkrieg
- Bronz

=== C ===
- Charlie ’Ungry
- Chateaux
- Chrome Molly
- Cloven Hoof

=== D ===
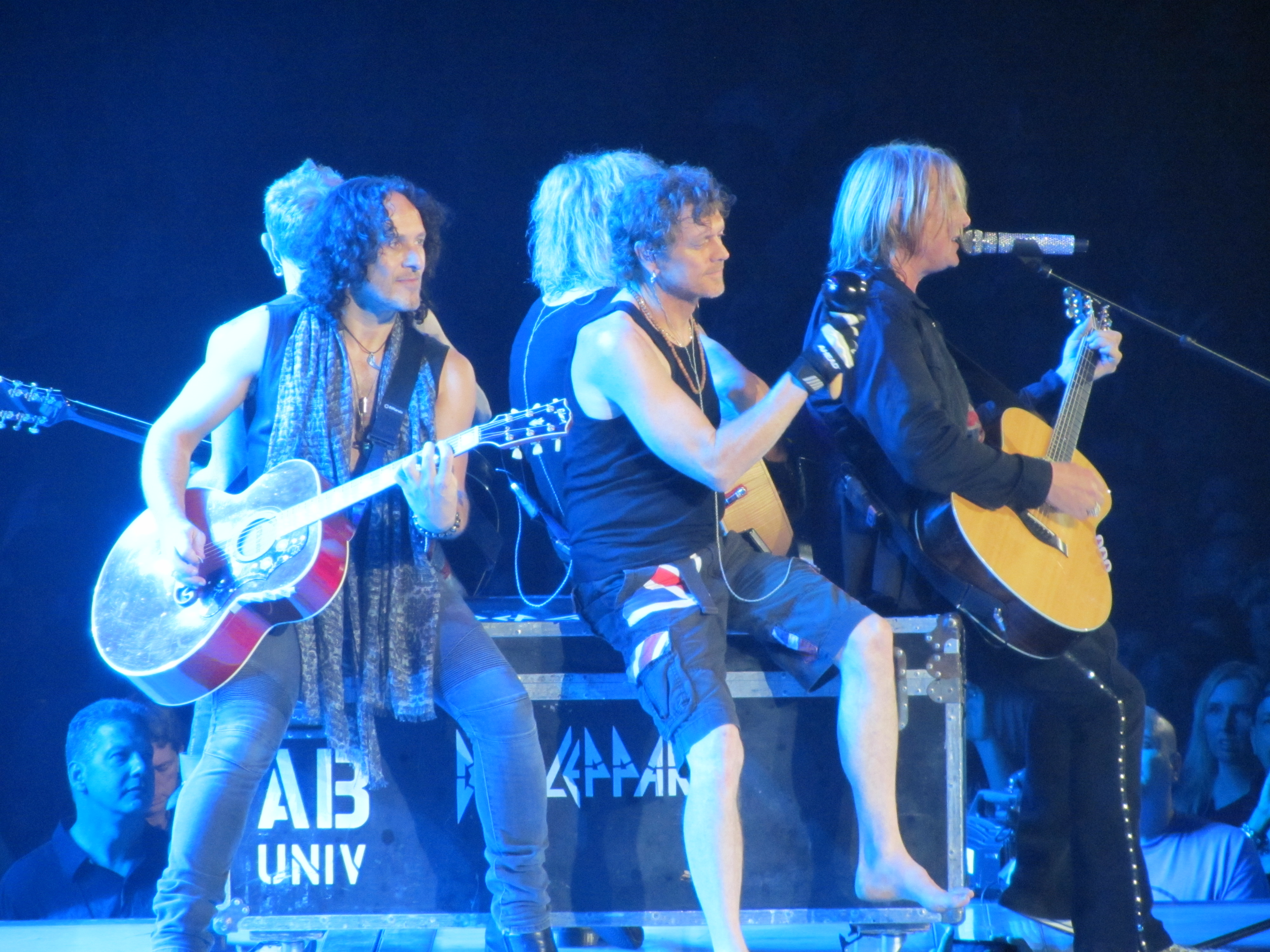
Def Leppard

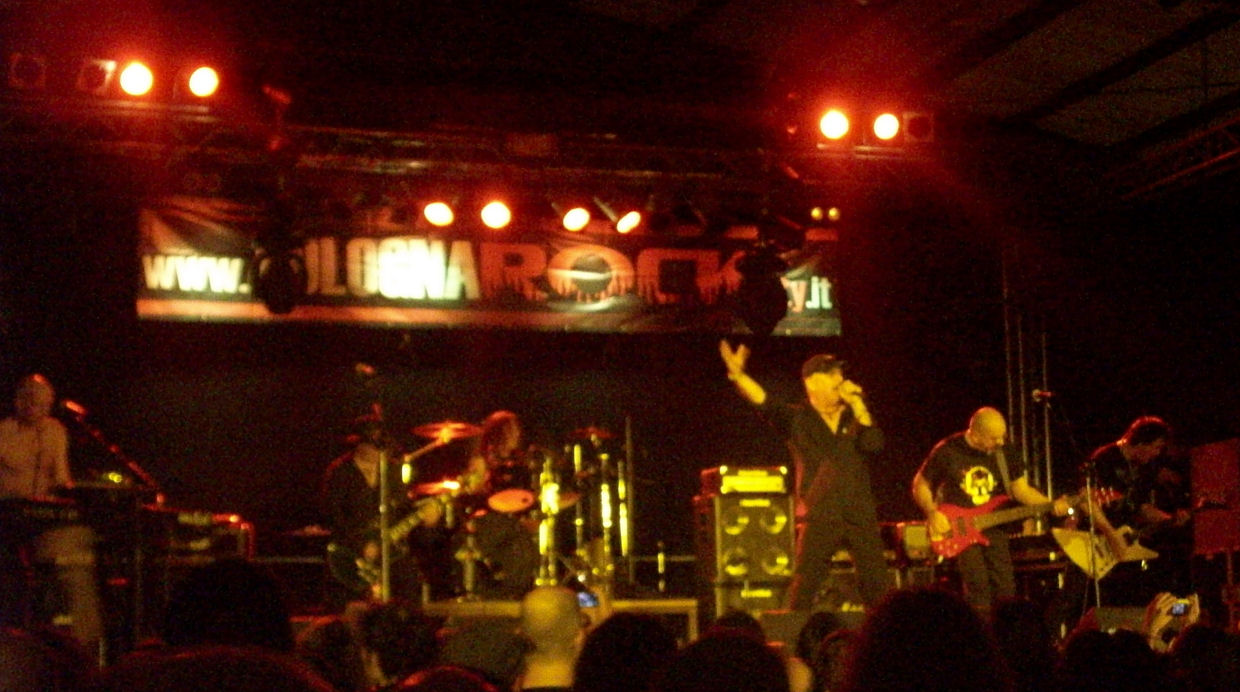
Demon

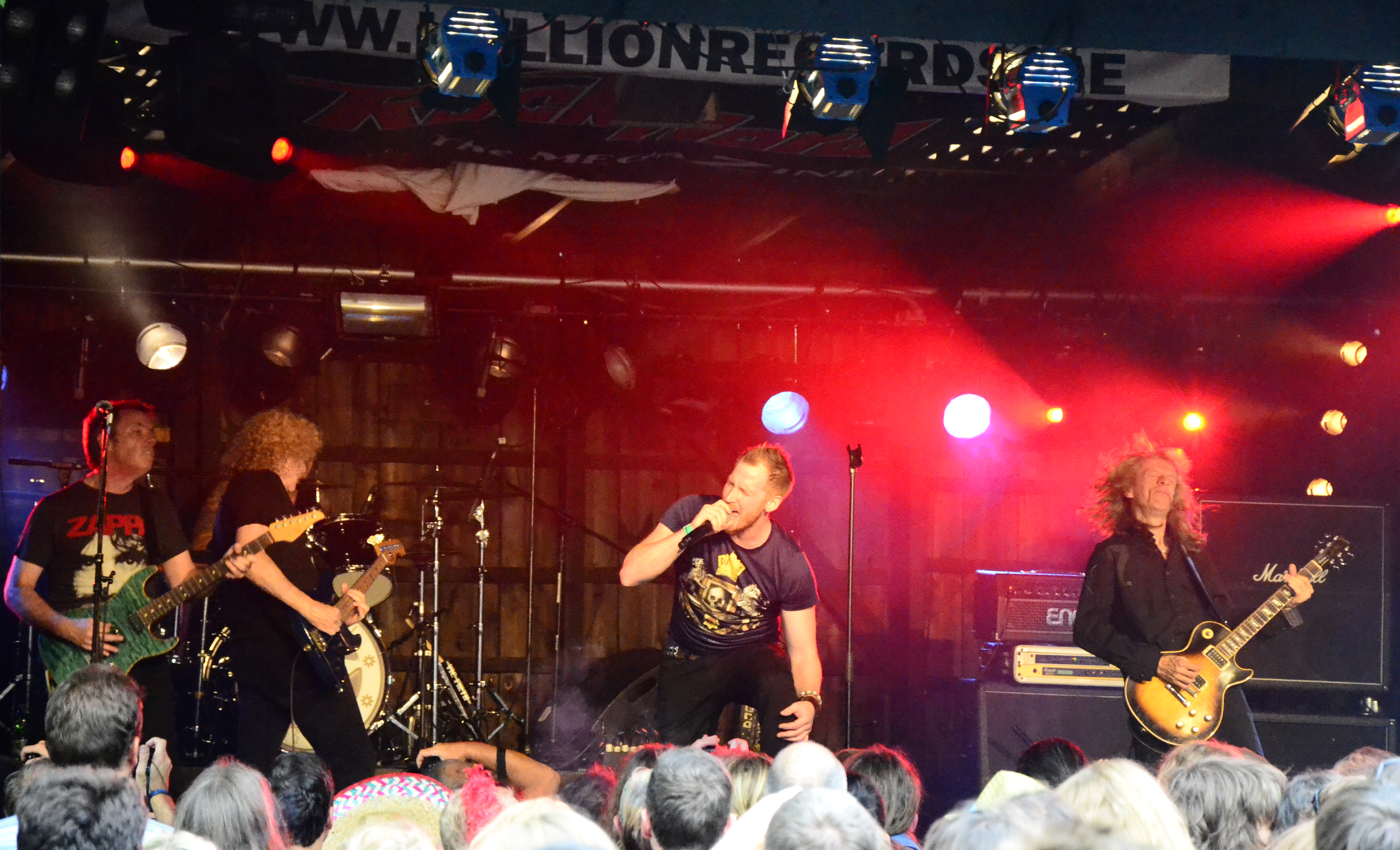
Diamond Head

- Dedringer
- Deep Machine
- Def Leppard
- Demon
- Diamond Head
- Di'Anno
- Dragonslayer
- Dumpy's Rusty Nuts

=== E ===
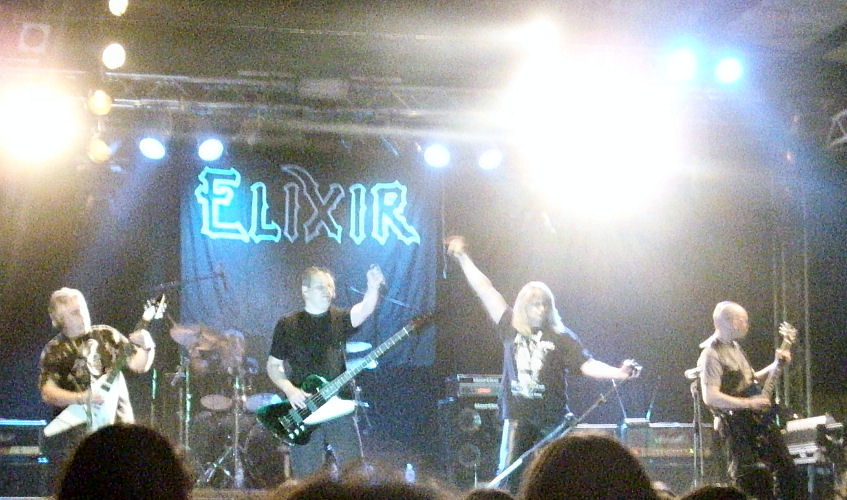
Elixir

- E. F. Band
- Elixir
- Ethel the Frog

=== F ===
- Fist

=== G ===
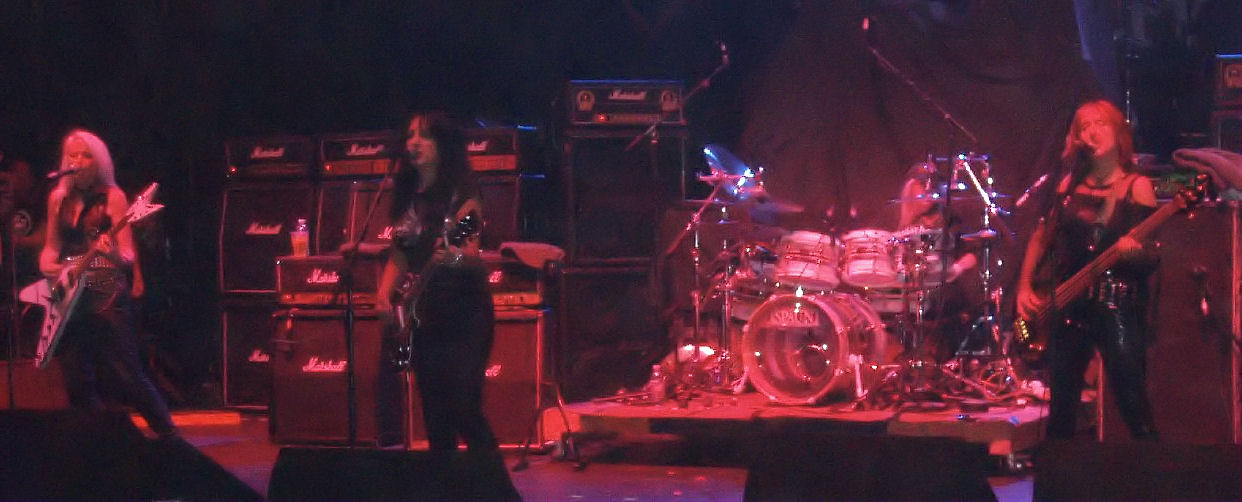
Girlschool

- Girl
- Girlschool

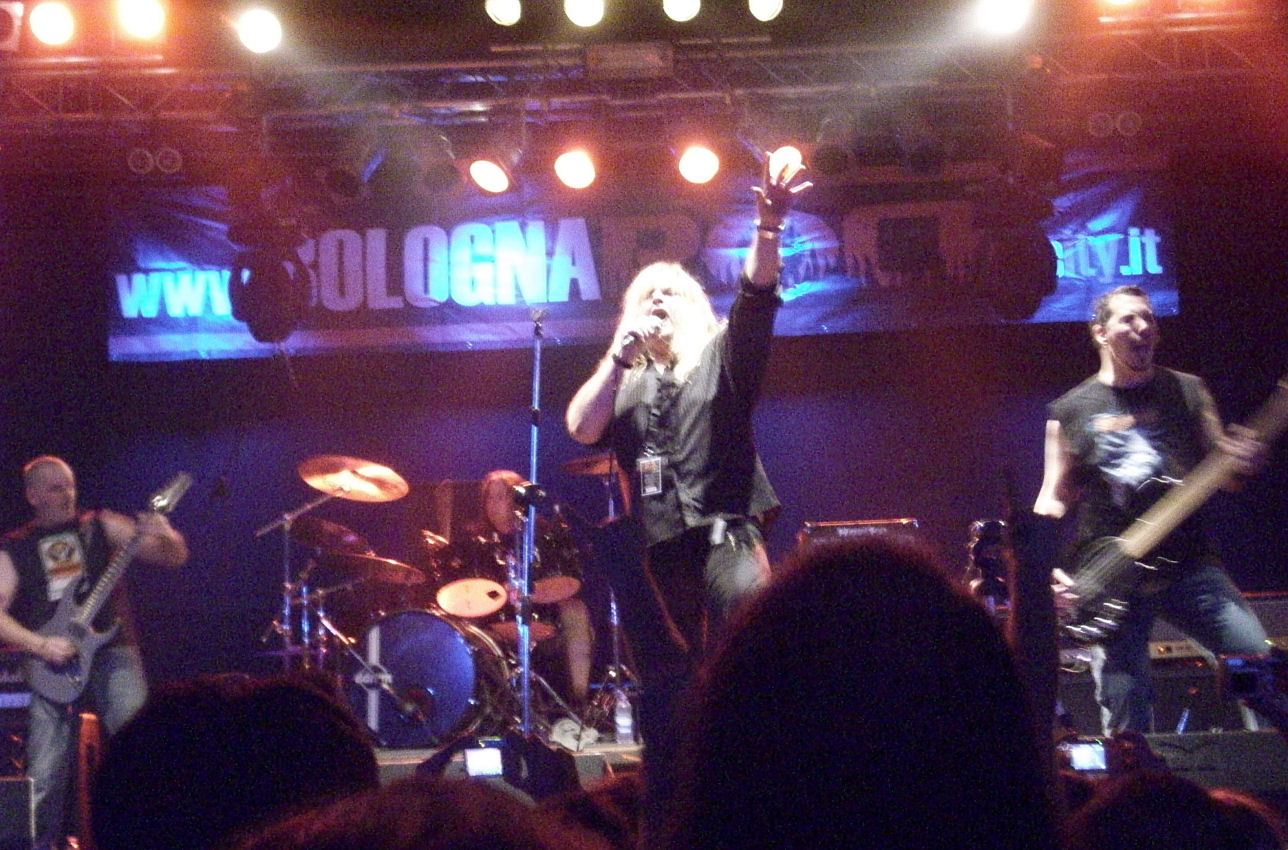
Grim Reaper

- Gogmagog
- Grand Prix
- Grim Reaper

=== H ===
- The Handsome Beasts
- Haze
- Hell
- HellsBelles
- Hollow Ground
- Holocaust

=== I ===
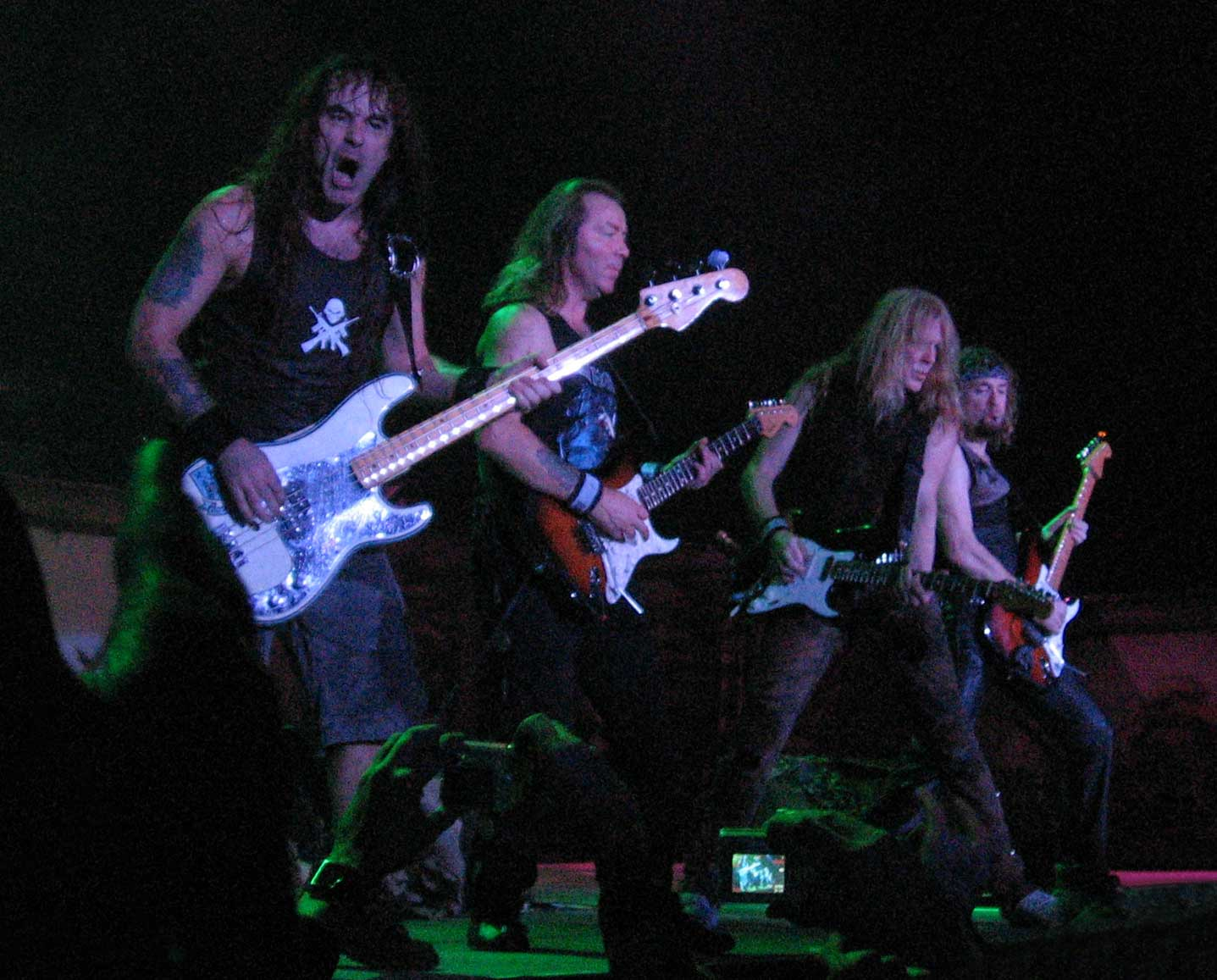
Iron Maiden

- Iron Maiden

=== J ===
- Jaguar
- Jameson Raid

=== L ===
- Lionheart

=== M ===
- Mama's Boys
- Marseille
- McCoy
- Mirage
- More
- Mournblade

=== N ===
- The Next Band
- Nicky Moore Band
- Nightwing

=== P ===
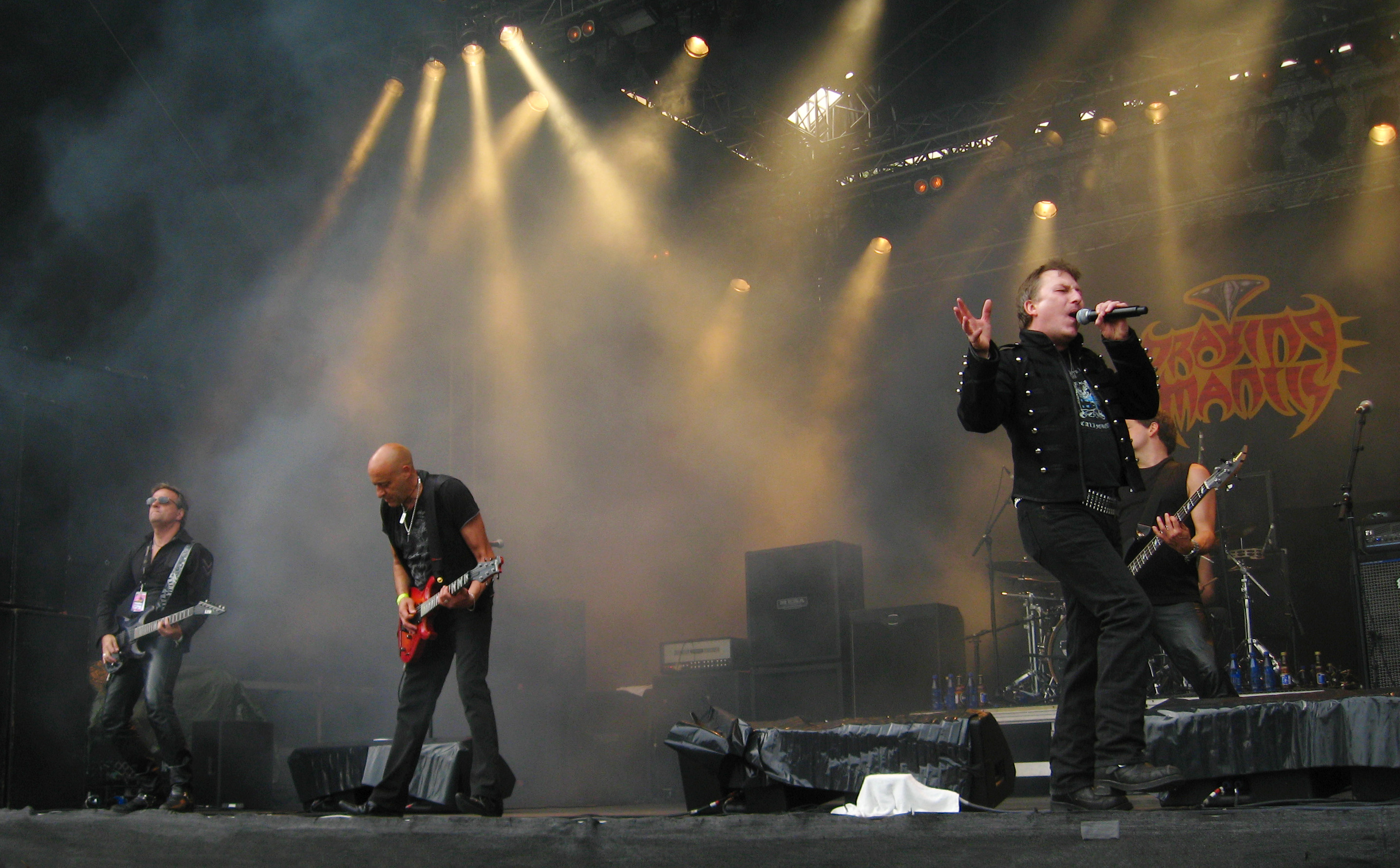
Praying Mantis

- Pagan Altar
- Persian Risk
- Praying Mantis

=== Q ===
- Quartz

=== R ===
- Race Against Time

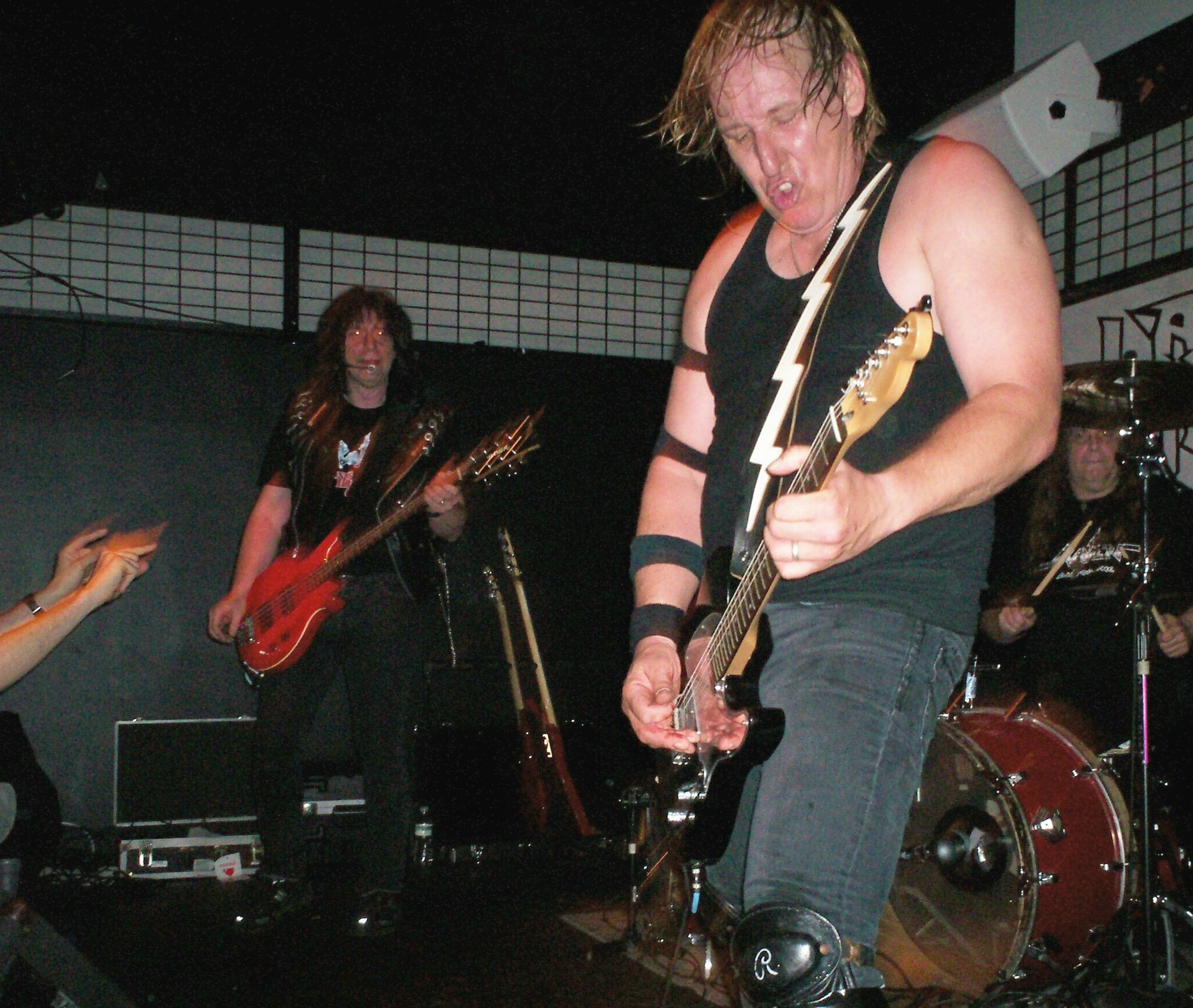
Raven

- Raven
- Rock Goddess
- Rogue Male

=== S ===
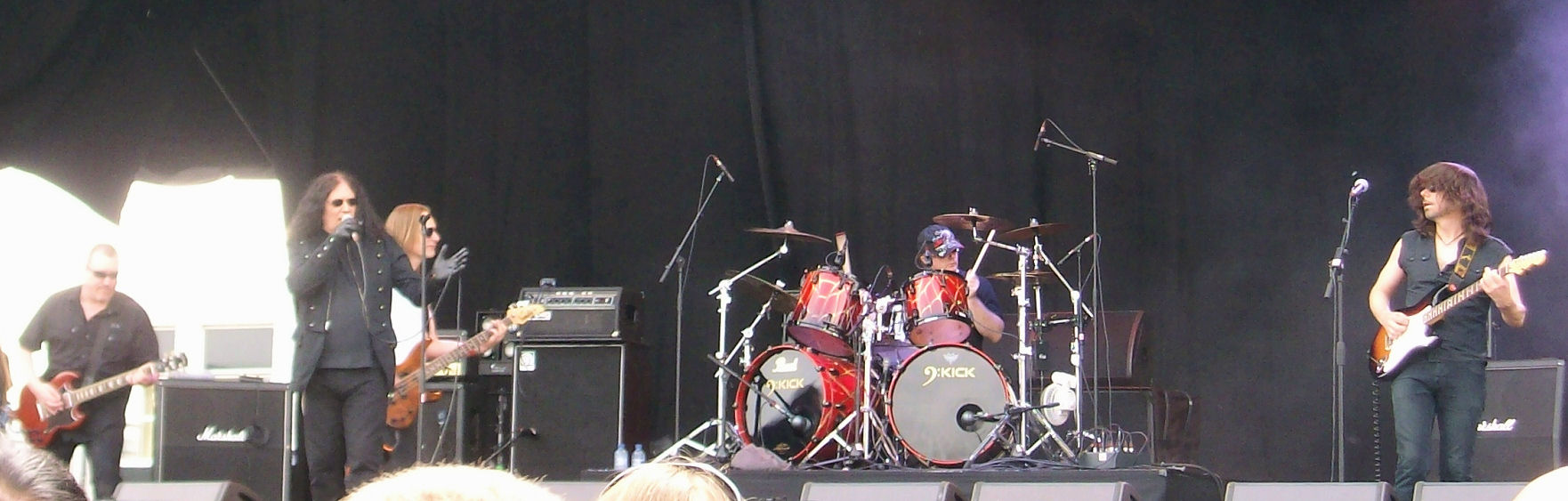
Satan

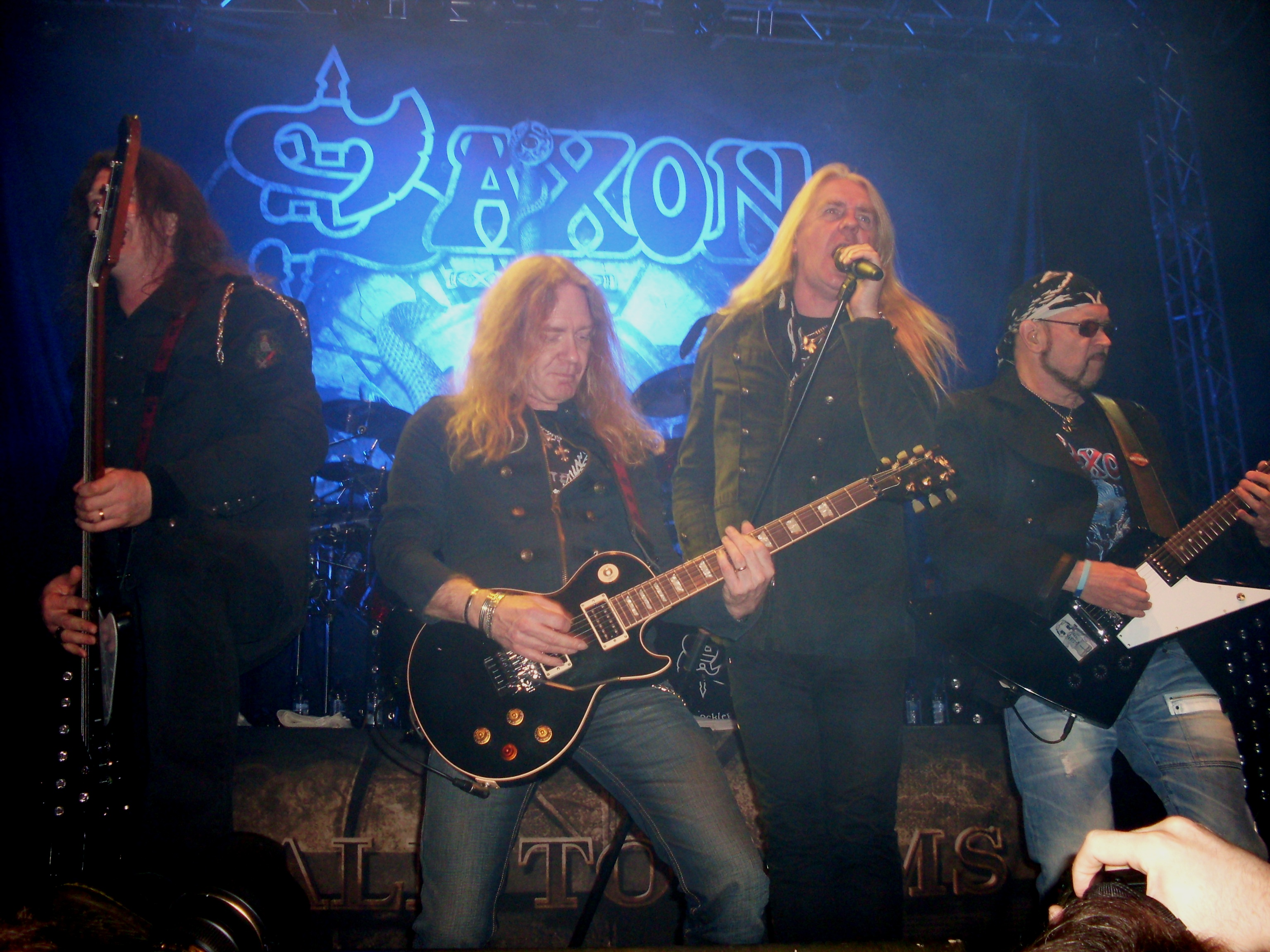
Saxon

- Salem
- Samson
- Saracen
- Satan
- Savage
- Saxon
- Shy
- Spider
- Stampede
- Starfighters
- Stratus
- Sweet Savage

=== T ===
- Tank
- Terraplane
- Thunderstick
- Tobruk
- Tokyo Blade
- Tredegar
- Trespass
- Tygers of Pan Tang
- Tytan

=== U ===
- Urchin

=== V ===
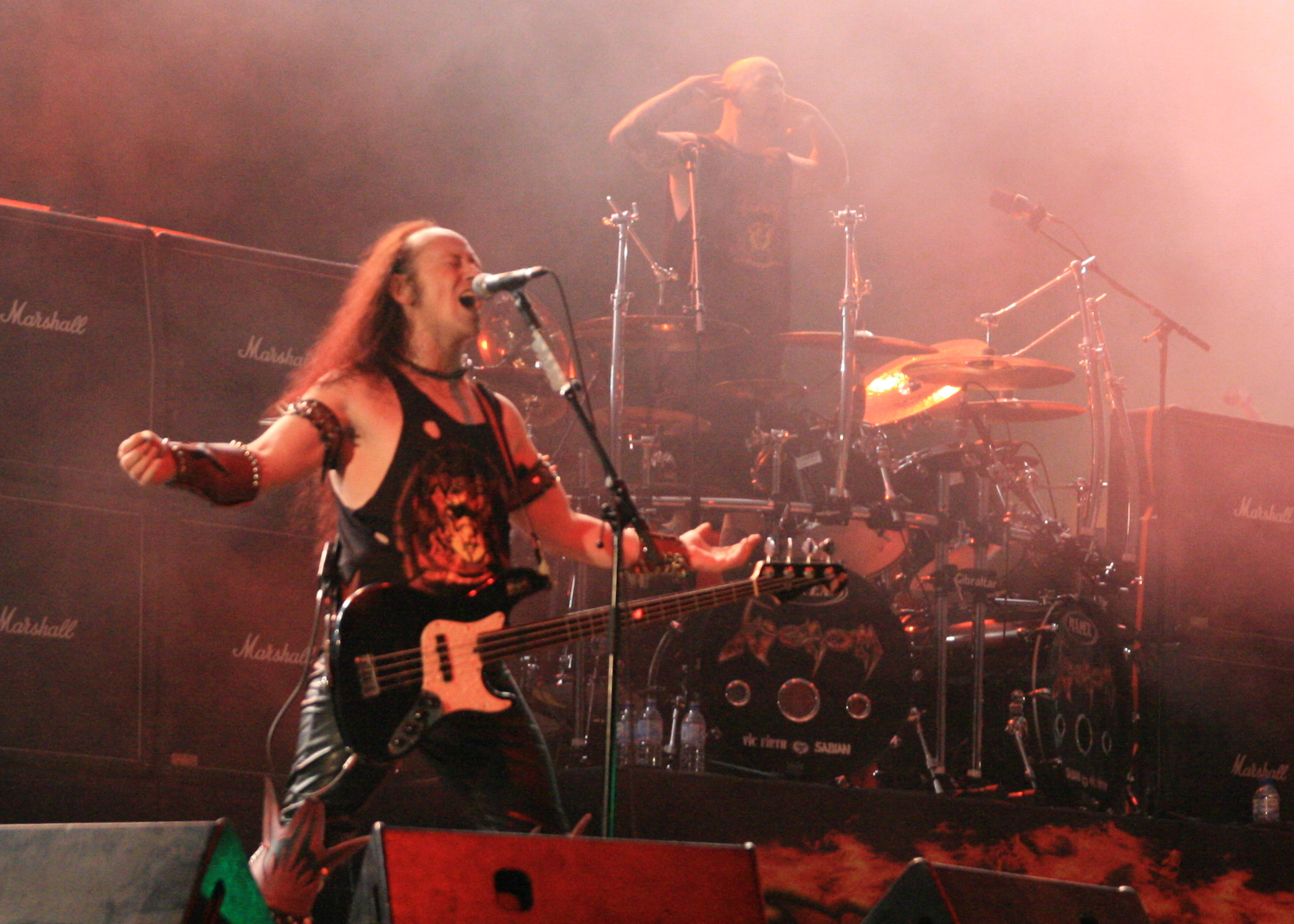
Venom

- Vardis
- Venom
- Virtue

=== W ===
- Warfare
- White Spirit
- Wild Horses
- Witchfinder General
- Witchfynde
- Wrathchild

== Other bands sometimes associated with the NWOBHM ==
- Budgie
- Gillan
- Judas Priest
- Motörhead
- UFO

== See also ==
- New wave of American heavy metal
- New wave of traditional heavy metal
