= E. F. Band =

Swedish heavy metal band

E.F. Band
- Origin: Gothenburg, Sweden
- Genres: Heavy metal
- Years active: 1978 – 1986
- Labels: Mercury, Ewita, Mausoleum
- Members: Pär Ericsson; Bengt Fischer; Dag Eliason
- Past members: Dave Dufort; John Ridge; Roger Marsden; Andy LaRocque; Tony Borg

E.F. Band was a Swedish band that sometimes were mixed up with the New wave of British heavy metal movement, even though they were Swedish. The band was formed in 1978 by bassist/vocalist Pär Ericsson and guitarist Bengt Fischer, two former members of the progressive rock band Epizootic, who were initially joined by Tommy Lager on drums. The "E.F." portion of the band's name was derived from the first letter of Ericsson and Fischer's last names. After recording their first (split) single, the band released another single on the independent Aerco label, using "Another Day Gone" as the B-side, adding "Night Angel" on the A-side. After the single, the band hired British drummer Dave Dufort, who had played with Mike Oldfield and Screaming Lord Sutch to solidify the line-up.

Dufort recorded the "Self Made Suicide" and "Devil's Eye' singles and the Metal For Muthas, Vol. 1 contribution "Fighting For Rock And Roll", with the band but left before the first album, Last Laugh Is On You, produced by Derek Lawrence of Deep Purple fame. Dufort was replaced by Dag Eliason, making the band an all-Swedish trio once again. E.F. Band supported the album by touring as openers for Rainbow on their European tour. Coming off the road, the band decided to expand to a four-piece adding Dutchman John Ridge as lead singer in 1982 who would feature on the second album, Deep Cut. Again the band hit the road, this time as support for Saxon on their European tour in addition to headlining their own shows. Tony Borg (Alien), was added as extra guitarist but he did not stay for long. Although things seemed to be going well, Ridge announced his departure from the band and was replaced by London-based Roger Marsden (ex-Deep Machine, Angel Witch) in 1983. The band also decided to add a second guitarist and eventually brought in future King Diamond guitarist Andy LaRocque, then known as Anders Allhage, to strengthen their sound. With Marsden and Allhage on board, the band recorded their third and final studio album, One Night Stand, released in 1985. After playing a few scattered shows to promote the record, E.F. Band broke up in 1986.

2003 saw the release of the two-disc retrospective Their Finest Hours, which contained all three of the band's studio albums, the "Self Made Suicide" and "Devil's Eye" singles, and several unreleased studio and live bonus tracks. The album's final track, "Remembering You", is a tribute to E.F. Band co-founder Bengt Fischer, who died of cancer on 5 April 2001, written and performed by John Boutkam, aka John Ridge.

A live album, Live At The Mudd Club In Gothenburg 1983, recorded by the Deep Cut line-up with John Ridge on vocals, was issued in 2005. Ridge died on 4 March 2003 after a lengthy battle with brain cancer. After his time with the E.F. Band, Ridge had been working in radio, as a presenter at OK Radio in Hamburg, Germany, calling himself John de Graaf, and at Radio Caroline where he hosted the "New Americana" program under his real name, John Boutkam.

== Discography ==
=== Singles ===
- "October Friday" [Synchromesh] b/w "Another Day Gone" [E.F. Band] 7" split single (Rok, 1979)
- "Night Angel" b/w "Another Day Gone" 7" (Aerco, 1979)
- "Self Made Suicide" b/w "Sister Syne" 7" (Redball, 1980)
- "Devil's Eye" b/w "Comprende" (Redball, 1980; Mercury Sweden, 1980)
- "Night Angel" b/w "Another Day Gone" 7" (Aerco, 1980)

=== Albums ===
- Last Laugh Is on You (Mercury, 1981)
- Deep Cut (Ewita, 1982)
- One Night Stand (Mausoleum, 1985)
- Their Finest Hours (Sweden Rock, 2003)
- Live at the Mudd Club in Gothenburg 1983 (TPL, 2005)

=== Compilations ===
- Metal for Muthas, Vol. 1 ("Fighting for Rock and Roll") (EMI, 1980)
- Total Metal Attack ("Hard, Hot & Heavy") (Old School, 2004)

== See also ==
- List of new wave of British heavy metal bands
