= Spider (British band) =

British heavy metal band

- Origin: Wirral, England
- Genres: Boogie rock, hard rock
- Years active: 1976–1986
- Labels: RCA, A&M, Pye
- Past members: Dave "Sniffa" Bryce (guitar); Colin Harkness (vocals); Brian Burrows (bass Rob E Burrows (drums)

Spider were a British hard rock band formed in Wirral in 1976 who were part of the new wave of British heavy metal (NWOBHM). The band were often compared to Status Quo for their upbeat boogie rock sound. Spider released three albums, titled Rock 'n' Roll Gypsies (1982) Rough Justice (1984) and Raise the Banner (For Rock 'n' Roll) (1986).

== Career ==
Spider formed in 1976, consisting of four young men from Wallasey, including brothers Brian and Rob Burrows, none of whom had played in bands before.

After the release of their sophomore single "Children of the Street" on the independent label Alien Records, Spider were playing an average of 20 shows a month, which included a support slot on the Uriah Heep 1980 Winter Tour.

1982 proved to be the band's most commercially successful year, following music industry buzz generated when BBC Radio 1 commissioned them to perform on Friday Rock Show the previous year. The show's producer, Tony Wilson, introduced them to Maggi Farren, who set up a recording deal with Creole Records, as well as getting the band a support slot on Slade's 1981 winter tour.

Spider released the single "Talkin' 'bout Rock 'n' Roll" with Creole, which featured on BBC Radio 1's playlist. They then went into the studio to begin recording their first album Rock 'n' Roll Gypsies, to be released on the Creole label also. However RCA made a late bid for the band, and after negotiations, Spider signed a six-year recording contract with them.

1982 continued with Spider playing consistently sold out monthly shows at the Marquee Club and supporting Alice Cooper on the British leg of his Special Forces Tour, playing at the Reading Festival on Sunday 29 August 1982, and securing a support slot on a much-anticipated Gillan tour, which coincided with the release of Spider's first album, Rock 'n' Roll Gypsies.

The band released two more albums, 1984's Rough Justice, and 1986's Raise the Banner (For Rock 'n' Roll), then split that year.

The band had announced a reunion in 2016, but this was cancelled due to unforeseen circumstances.

On 22 July 2022, it was announced on the band's official Facebook page that Colin Harkness had died at the age of 62.

Dave Bryce, guitarist, currently plays with the London-based rock band A.W.O.L., who are named after the opening track on Spider's debut album, Rock 'n' Roll Gypsies.

== Band members ==
- Colin Harkness - lead vocals, guitar (died 2022)
- Dave "Sniffa" Bryce - guitar, backing vocals
- Brian Burrows - bass, backing vocals
- Rob E. Burrows - drums

== Discography ==
=== Albums ===
Year	Title	Peak chart positions	Format
Year	Title	UK	Format
1982	Rock 'n' Roll Gypsies	75	12" vinyl
1984	Rough Justice	96	12" vinyl
1986	Raise the Banner (For Rock 'n' Roll)	-	12" vinyl
2007	Rock 'n' Roll Gypsies	-	CD
2007	Rough Justice	-	CD
2011	The Singles Collection	-	CD box set
2012	The Complete Anthology	-	CD box set

=== Singles ===
Year	Title	Peak chart positions
Year	Title	UK
1977	"Back to the Wall"	-
1980	"Children of the Street"	-
1980	"College Luv"	-
1981	"All the Time"	-
1982	"Talkin' 'Bout Rock 'n' Roll"	-
1982	"Rock 'n' Roll Forever Will Last"	-
1982	"Amazing Grace Medley" (promo)	-
1983	"Why D'Ya Lie to Me"	65
1984	"Here We Go Rock 'n' Roll"	57
1984	"Breakaway"	92
1986	"Gimme Gimme It All"	96

== See also ==
- List of new wave of British heavy metal bands
