= Mirage (metal band) =

British heavy metal band

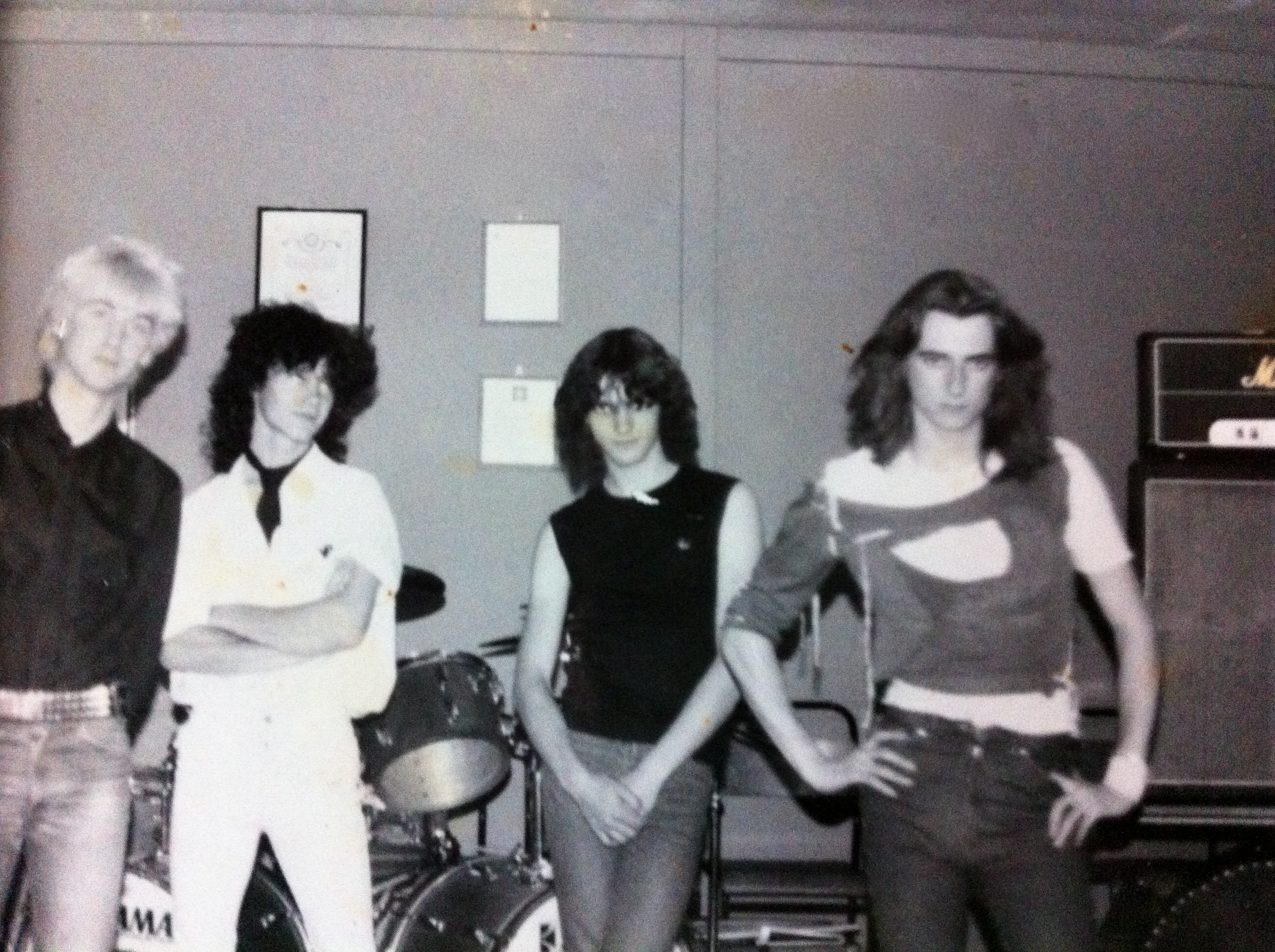
Band members: Gerry Turner, Richard Morgan, Carl Skinner, Richard Price

Mirage was a heavy metal band that was formed in 1983 from the remnants of two Welsh rock/metal bands, Rough Justice and Exit. The band were based in the valleys of South East Wales. Its members were Richard Morgan (a.k.a. "Wretch) on vocals, Richard Price on guitar, Carl Skinner on bass and Gerry Turner on drums. In 1984, they released one track, "Blind Fury", on a compilation album produced by local record company Notepad Productions. This came to the attention of Malc Macmillan, author of the Encyclopaedia of New Wave of British Heavy Metal (NWoBHM) who described their track "Blind Fury" as "truly one of the classic tracks of the entire NWoBHM genre". The rare Notepad Productions Volume I album remains highly sought after by collectors – featured in Record Collector Magazine in January 2015. The band has enjoyed some recent attention from High Roller Records who have re-released their tracks "Blind Fury"/"Twilight Zone" on black and white vinyl. The cover features Richard Price's original 1979 Fender Stratocaster guitar alongside a Turner family artefact from World War II.
