= Neal Kay =

British disc jockey

Neal Kay (born 10 February 1950) is a former London-based disc jockey, who was an important factor in the rise of the new wave of British heavy metal (NWOBHM), along with Tommy Vance, in the late 1970s and early 1980s.

== Career ==
Neal Kay has always been a DJ. He started out in the local youth club in the mid-sixties, and by the end of the 60s was a well established London-based night club DJ, working fully 6 nights a week. In 1969 he went to West Berlin with his future first wife, a dancer, to guest DJ in two clubs a night from dusk until dawn. His main club in Berlin was the Playboy Club. He also guested from time to time with the British Army.

In the period between 1975 and 1980, he managed a rock club called The Bandwagon Heavy Metal Soundhouse, originally resident in the back-room of the Prince of Wales public house in Kingsbury, North London; this back-room venue was known as 'The Bandwagon'. With great help from the music papers of the day, Sounds and Melody Maker, he went on to establish this venue as the place for new upcoming bands and like minded fans of the heavy metal genre. Demo tapes started to arrive in their hundreds shortly after a two-page centre spread in Sounds, penned by journalist Geoff Barton. Kay had one of the biggest club sound systems ever seen at the time, being an 8000 watt PA, comprising mainly JBL/Martin speakers and coach built JPS associates amps. In fact it was a touring style band system that he used to play his large collection of classic rock vinyl on. The PA was so loud that the mixing desk was "flown" on chains, suspended from the roof to help avoid feedback from the record decks.

All this attention in the media raised his profile, and he was often seen at large gigs such as the Rainbow Theatre and Hammersmith Odeon, eventually going on to touring with some of the top acts of the day, including Black Sabbath (with Ronnie James Dio), Rush, AC/DC, Judas Priest and many more. He was the first high level touring rock DJ of his time. In fact, early on, he also arranged personal appearances at the Wagon with such internationally famous rock legends as Ted Nugent, members of Rainbow, Judas Priest and Motörhead. All this helped to raise the profile of both the club and Kay even higher.

He also helped arranging and producing demos of new bands, recorded at Spaceward Studios in Cambridge. Amongst these bands were, Saxon, Praying Mantis and Iron Maiden, at the time new unsigned up and coming bands which would become key players of the NWOBHM – a phrase first coined by the then editor of Sounds. He championed these and other acts, and went on to tour with those bands on full UK tours. The resulting popularity of Iron Maiden's recording led to a record contract for them with EMI. Several other NWOBHM bands also gained contracts due to their Soundhouse demos. Kay worked with EMI Records compiling many of these demos onto an album called Metal for Muthas, of which several volumes were released.

In 1980, he was the MC for the very first Monsters of Rock Festival, at Castle Donington, headlined by Rainbow, Scorpions and Judas Priest. He also promoted heavy metal concerts and tours, and was an enthusiastic champion of US band Riot. Kay was also a band manager in the 1980s and early 1990s. During that same period, Neal also managed a large studio complex in South London called Samurai Studios, where he also learned the art of live sound engineering.

Also in the 90s, he went on tour to Japan with elements of Praying Mantis, ex-Iron Maiden and The Sweet. Whilst there he arranged with Japanese label Pony Canyon to record in London a new compilation LP called, "Metal For Muthas 92", which was released in 1993 in Japan and Far Eastern territories.

In fact, some time in the late 1970s, the Japanese music paper Ongu Senka approached Kay to write the story of the Bandwagon in 3 episodes, which, in turn helped to bring to the attention of young Japanese fans, the legend of The Soundhouse.

In the early nineties, whilst in Portugal, he came across a bar band called IRIS (Portuguese for Rainbow) and was asked to work with them on what was to become their first CD. It was released to the Portuguese speaking world in 1996 and to this day, Kay still enjoys producing, arranging and even occasionally orchestrating some of the band's work, now 25 years on from when they first met each other. He has also been working with Stormzone, a Northern Irish heavy metal band out of Belfast. Kay produced their first CD and continues to have input on their latest songs. He also worked as a guest on Total Rock radio from time to time, with old time journalist/broadcaster mate Malcolm Dome, who, years before had given Kay and The Soundhouse a great review in the pages of Record Mirror. They called the 3-hour shows "The Rock n'Roll Round Table Circus", and it was a mixture of classic rock tracks and pure insanity, with the occasional studio guests, and 6-hour Xmas specials.

Although officially "retired", Neal continues with his studio work and occasionally donates time to various documentaries about the life, times, and the music that he always fought to help establish. In fact, even to this day, he still works with young up and coming bands, mainly in Portugal, both encouraging, arranging, producing and teaching the ways of Rock N' Roll to a whole new generation of determined and committed young singers and musicians, whilst finding time occasionally to deliver lectures in colleges on the history and main movers thru the 50s and 60s-the most formative years of the whole genre.
