= The Handsome Beasts =

English heavy metal band

- Also known as: The Beasts
- Origin: Birmingham, England
- Genres: Heavy metal, hard rock
- Years active: 1972–present

The Handsome Beasts are an English heavy metal band who surfaced during the new wave of British heavy metal. Currently enjoying a resurgence in popularity, their album Beastiality is infamous for being featured on several "worst album cover of all time" lists.

Their vocalist, Garry Dallaway, died of a heart attack on 20 August 2006.

== Career ==
=== Original lineup ===
- Garry Dallaway – vocals
- Pete Malbasa – drums
- Steven Hough – bass
- James Stephen Barrett – lead and rhythm guitar, backing vocals

=== Past members and contributors ===
- Ray Richman – drums
- Maz Mitrenko – guitar
- Marco Foley – guitar
- Mark Knight – bass
- Nick Foley – Hammond organ, keyboards

== Discography ==
=== Albums ===
- Beastiality (Heavy Metal Records, 1981)
- The Beast Within (Heavy Metal Records, 1990)
- 04 (Heavy Rock Records, 2004)
- Rock and a Hard Place (Q Records, 2007)
- Filthy Lucre (Heavy Metal Records, 2010)

=== Singles ===
- "All Riot Now" EP (Heavy Metal Records, 1980)
- "Breaker" EP (Heavy Metal Records, 1981)
- "Sweeties" EP (Heavy Metal Records, 1981)

== See also ==
- List of new wave of British heavy metal bands
