= 1986 in heavy metal music =

This is a timeline documenting the events of heavy metal in the year 1986.

== Newly formed bands ==
- 24-7 Spyz
- Accuser
- Acid Drinkers
- Agressor
- Ahat
- Anacrusis
- Angkor Wat
- Atrophy
- Baton Rouge
- Believer
- Black Obelisk
- Bolt Thrower
- Bonfire
- Brutality
- Cacophony
- Cerebral Fix
- Circus of Power
- Cold
- Confessor
- Cycle Sluts from Hell
- Darkthrone
- DBC (Dead Brain Cells)
- Demolition Hammer
- Despair
- Dreamscape
- Elegy
- Evildead
- Front Line Assembly
- Grave
- Harlow
- Immolation
- Infernäl Mäjesty
- Invocator
- Katedra
- La Pestilencia
- M.O.D.
- Mana Mana
- Manic Street Preachers
- Manitoba's Wild Kingdom
- Massacra
- Mastermind
- McAuley Schenker Group
- Merciless
- Mezarkabul
- Mortem
- Mucky Pup
- Nelson
- Nuclear Death
- OLD
- Opprobrium
- Paradox
- Pestilence
- Prong
- Revelation
- Risk
- Salty Dog
- Scanner
- Sinawe
- Skid Row
- Sugar Ray
- Terrorizer
- Trauma
- Treponem Pal
- Unseen Terror
- Vain
- Vanden Plas
- Vastator
- Viking
- Waltari
- XYZ

== Albums & EPs ==
- Aaronsrod - Illusions Kill
- Abattoir - The Only Safe Place
- Accept - Russian Roulette
- AC/DC - Who Made Who (soundtrack to Maximum Overdrive)
- ADX – La Terreur
- Alcatrazz - Dangerous Games
- Alice Cooper - Constrictor
- Alien Force - Pain and Pleasure
- Angel Dust – Into the Dark Past
- Angel Witch – Frontal Assault
- Ángeles del Infierno - Instinto Animal (EP)
- Anthem - Tightrope
- Asgard - In the Ancient Days
- Atomkraft – Queen of Death (EP)
- Attila – Rolling Thunder
- At War - Ordered to Kill
- Axtion – Live (EP)
- Baby Tuckoo - Force Majeure
- Bad Brains - I Against I
- Banshee - Cry in the Night (EP)
- Barren Cross - Rock for the King
- Beowülf - Beowülf
- Bitches Sin – Invaders
- Billy Idol – Whiplash Smile
- Black Fate - Commander of Fate
- Black Ice - Hot-N-Heavy (EP)
- Black 'n Blue - Nasty Nasty
- Black Rose – Walk It How You Talk It
- Black Sabbath - Seventh Star
- Blacksmith – Blacksmith (EP)
- Blade Runner – Warriors of Rock
- Bloodgood - Bloodgood
- Blood Money – Red Raw And Bleeding!
- Bonfire - Don't Touch the Light
- Bon Jovi - Slippery When Wet
- Bride - Show No Mercy
- Britny Fox - In America (EP)
- The Brood - The Brood
- Burning Starr - No Turning Back
- Candlemass - Epicus Doomicus Metallicus
- Castle Blak - Another Dark Carneval
- Carrion – Evil Is There
- Cerberus - Too Late to Pray
- Chariot - Burning Ambition
- Charon – Made In Aluminium
- Chastain - Ruler of the Wasteland
- Child'ƨ Play - Ruff House (EP)
- Cinderella - Night Songs
- Cirith Ungol - One Foot in Hell
- Cities - Annihilation Absolute
- CJSS - World Gone Mad
- CJSS - Praise the Loud
- Cloven Hoof – Fighting Back (live)
- Cobra (UK) – Back From the Dead
- Crimson Glory - Crimson Glory
- Cro-Mags - The Age of Quarrel
- Crumbsuckers - Life of Dreams
- Cryptic Slaughter - Convicted
- Damien Throne - The Sign of the Jackal
- Dark Angel - Darkness Descends
- D.C. Lacroix - Crack of Doom
- Deaf Dealer - Keeper of the Flame
- Dealer – First Strike
- Death Row - Riders of Doom, aka Satan's Gift
- Deep Switch - Nine Inches of God
- Demon - Demon (EP)
- Desolation Angels – Desolation Angels
- Destruction - Eternal Devastation
- Detente - Recognize No Authority
- Diamond - Diamond
- Diamond Rexx - Land of the Damned
- Paul Di'Anno's Battlezone – Fighting Back
- Dio - Intermission (live)
- Dirty Looks – In Your Face
- Dr. Mastermind - Dr. Mastermind
- Earthshaker - Overrun
- Easy Action – That Makes One
- Eden - Eden
- Elektradrive - ...Over the Space
- Elixir - The Son of Odin
- Emerald - Armed For Battle
- Europe - The Final Countdown
- Excess - Melting Point
- Exciter - Unveiling the Wicked
- Exorcist - Nightmare Theater
- Faithful Breath - Live
- Fastway - Trick or Treat
- Fates Warning - Awaken the Guardian
- Fifth Angel - Fifth Angel
- Firstryke - Just A Nightmare
- Flatbacker - Esa
- Flotsam and Jetsam - Doomsday for the Deceiver
- Force - Set Me Free
- Forever – Forever & Ever
- Foreplay - Hot 'N Heavy (EP)
- Formel 1 - Live im Stahlwerk
- Gehenna - Escuadrón Metálico (Proyecto I) (split)
- Girlschool - Nightmare at Maple Cross
- Giuffria - Silk + Steel
- Grave Digger - War Games
- Gravestone – Creating a Monster
- Digger (Grave Digger) - Stronger Than Ever
- Great White - Shot in the Dark
- Griffin - Protector of the Lair
- Guns N' Roses - Live ?!*@ Like a Suicide (EP)
- Hallowed - Hallowed
- Hallows Eve - Death & Insanity
- Hammeron – Nothin' To Do But Rock
- Have Mercy - Armageddon Descends (EP)
- Hawk - Hawk
- Heir Apparent - Graceful Inheritance
- Helstar - Remnants of War
- Heretic - Torture Knows No Boundary (EP)
- Hexx - Under the Spell
- High Power - Les Violons de Satan
- Hirax - Hate, Fear and Power
- Holy Moses - Queen of Siam
- Hurricane - Take What You Want
- Hyde (CA) - Hyde
- Impaler - If We Had Brains... We'd Be Dangerous!
- Iron Angel - Winds of War
- Iron Maiden - Somewhere in Time
- Jesters of Destiny - Fun at the Funeral
- Judas Priest - Turbo
- Juggernaut - Baptism Under Fire
- Kat - Metal and Hell
- Kat - 666
- Keel - The Final Frontier
- Kick Axe - Rock the World
- Killer (Swi) - Young Blood
- Killer Dwarfs - Stand Tall
- Killers (Fra) - Danger de Vie
- King Diamond - Fatal Portrait
- King Kobra - Thrill of a Lifetime
- Krank - Hideous
- Kreator - Pleasure to Kill
- Krokus - Change of Address
- Krokus - Alive and Screamin' (live)
- Kuni - Masque
- Letchen Grey - Party Politics (EP)
- Lion - Power Love (EP)
- Living Death - Back to the Weapons (EP)
- Lizzy Borden - The Murderous Metal Roadshow (live)
- Lizzy Borden - Menace to Society
- London - Don't Cry Wolf
- Loudness – 8186 Live
- Loudness - Lightning Strikes
- M.A.R.S. - Project: Driver
- Tony MacAlpine - Edge of Insanity
- Mad Reign - Mad Reign (EP)
- Manilla Road - The Deluge
- Malisha - Serve Your Savage Beast
- Yngwie Malmsteen - Trilogy
- Frank Marino – Full Circle
- Martyr (Hol) - Darkness at Time's Edge
- Mass (Ger) - Kick Your Ass!
- Medieval - Medieval (EP)
- Megadeth - Peace Sells... But Who's Buying?
- Megattack - Raw Delivery
- Mekong Delta - Mekong Delta
- Messiah Prophet - Master of the Metal
- Metal Priest - Bursting Out
- Metal Church - The Dark
- Metal Massacre - Metal Massacre VII (Compilation, various artists)
- Metallica - Master of Puppets
- Militia - The Sybling (EP)
- Mindless Sinner - Turn on the Power
- Mistrust - Spin the World
- Vinnie Moore – Mind's Eye
- Mortal Sin - Mayhemic Destruction
- Motörhead - Orgasmatron
- Nightwing – VI
- Nuclear Assault - Brain Death (EP)
- Nuclear Assault - Game Over
- Obsession - Scarred for Life
- Obús - Dejarse la piel
- Omen - The Curse
- Onslaught - The Force
- Orphan Allies – Running From the Law
- Outside - Magic Sacrifice
- Ozzy Osbourne - The Ultimate Sin
- Oz - ...Decibel Storm...
- Pain - Insanity
- Panther - Panther (EP)
- Persian Risk - Rise Up
- Phantom Lord - Evil Never Sleeps
- Picture - Every Story Needs Another Picture
- Piledriver - Stay Ugly
- Poison - Look What the Cat Dragged In
- Possessed - Beyond the Gates
- Post Mortem – Coroner's Office
- Powerlord - The Awakening
- Powermad - Powermad (EP)
- Predator - Easy Prey
- Preyer – Terminator
- Purgatory - Tied to the Trax
- Queen - A Kind of Magic
- Queensrÿche - Rage for Order
- Quiet Riot - QR III
- Racer X - Street Lethal
- Rage - Reign of Fear
- Rankelson – Hungry For Blood
- Ratt - Dancing Undercover
- Ravage - Wrecking Ball
- Raven - The Pack Is Back
- Raven - Mad (EP)
- Razor - Malicious Intent
- Renegade - Renegade
- Ripper - ...And the Dead Shall Rise
- Rhoads - Into the Future
- Rock Goddess - Young & Free
- Canedy, Feinstein, Bordonaro & Caudle - Hollywood
- The Rods - Heavier Than Thou
- Rogue Male - Animal Man
- Rough Cutt - Wants You!
- David Lee Roth - Eat 'Em and Smile
- Ruthless - Discipline of Steel
- Sabbrabells - Sailing On the Revenge
- Sabotage - Behind the Lines
- Sacred Blade - Of The Sun + Moon
- Sacred Rite - Is Nothing Sacred?
- Sacrifice - Torment in Fire
- Sadus - D.T.P.
- Saint - Time's End
- Saint Vitus - Born Too Late
- Samhain - Samhain III: November-Coming-Fire
- Samson - Joint Forces
- Samson - Head Tactics (comp)
- Samurai – Weapon Master
- Satan - Into the Future (EP)
- Satan's Host - Metal from Hell
- Joe Satriani - Not of This Earth
- Savage Grace - After the Fall from Grace
- Savatage - Fight for the Rock
- Sentinel Beast - Depths of Death
- Sepultura - Morbid Visions
- Shark Island - S'cool Buss
- Silver Mountain - Hibiya: Live in Japan '85
- Sinner - Comin' Out Fighting
- Slaughter (Can) – Strappado
- Slayer - Reign in Blood
- Snake - Let The Music Begin
- Sodom - Obsessed by Cruelty
- Sortilège - Larmes de Héros
- Sound Barrier - Speed of Light
- Steel Angel – Kiss of Steel
- Steel Crown - Sunset Warriors
- Steeler (Ger) - Strike Back
- St. Elmo's Fire – St. Elmo's Fire
- Stone Fury - Let Them Talk
- Stormwitch - Stronger Than Heaven
- Stryper - To Hell with the Devil
- Sword - Metalized
- Syron Vanes – Revenge
- Talon - Vicious Game
- Tankard - Zombie Attack
- Tarot - Spell of Iron
- Tension - Breaking Point
- Tesla - Mechanical Resonance
- Thor - Recruits – Wild in the Streets
- Thor - The Edge of Hell
- TKO - Below the Belt
- Tormé – Back To Babylon
- Touched – Death Row
- Treat - The Pleasure Principle
- Tredegar - Tredegar
- Trilogy (Aus) - Next in Line (in EU); Saracen - Saracen (in Aus)
- Triumph - The Sport of Kings
- TT Quick - Metal of Honor
- Turbo - Kawaleria Szatana
- Tyga Mira – Deliverance
- Tygers of Pan Tang – First Kill (comp)
- Tyran' Pace - Watching You
- Tyrant (Ger) - Running Hot
- Tysondog - Crimes of Insanity
- V.V.S.I. - No Ace at Hand
- Vanadium – Born to Fight
- Van Halen - 5150
- Vardis - Vigilante
- Vengeance - We Have Ways to Make You Rock
- Venom - Eine Kleine Nachtmusik
- Victim - Dirty, Mean & Nasty (EP)
- Victory - Don't Get Mad... Get Even
- Villain - Only Time Will Tell (EP)
- Vinnie Vincent Invasion - Vinnie Vincent Invasion
- Voivod - Rrröööaaarrr
- Vow Wow - III
- Vulcain - Big Brothers
- W.A.S.P. - Inside the Electric Circus
- Warfare - Mayhem, Fuckin' Mayhem
- Warhead (Bel) - The Day After
- Warlock - True as Steel
- Waysted - Save Your Prayers
- Wendy O. Williams - Kommander of Kaos
- Whiplash - Power and Pain
- White Tiger - White Tiger
- Wrath - Fit of Anger
- X-Caliber - Warriors of the Night
- Zebra – 3.V
- Zero Nine – Intrigue
- Znöwhite - Live Suicide
- Zodiac Mindwarp - High Priest of Love (EP)

== Disbandments ==
- Pomaranča (reformed in 1990)
- Vatreni Poljubac (reformed in 1998)
- Warriors

== Events ==
- Living Colour's line-up is solidified to a quartet, consisting of Corey Glover (vocals), Vernon Reid (guitar), Muzz Skillings (bass), and Will Calhoun (drums).
- Phil Lynott, the former frontman of Thin Lizzy, dies at the age of 36 on January 4 from drug-related health problems.
- Metallica's third album Master of Puppets peaks at #29 on the Billboard 200, spending 72 weeks on the charts with minor radio airplay. Unfortunately, bassist Cliff Burton dies aged 24 on September 27 in a bus accident in Sweden. Jason Newsted from Phoenix band Flotsam and Jetsam is hired after auditions are held.
- Metal Hammer magazine is first published.
- Slayer's third album Reign in Blood peaks at 94 on the Billboard 200 with no radio airplay. The album also reached number 47 on the UK Album Chart,[14] and on November 20, 1992, it was certified gold in the United States. Kerrang! magazine described it as the "heaviest album of all time,"[16] while Metal Hammer magazine named it "the best metal album of the last 20 years."[17]
- Jeff "Mantas" Dunn leaves British band Venom to pursue a solo career.

Preceded by 1985	Heavy Metal Timeline; 1986	Succeeded by 1987
