= 1981 in heavy metal music =

This is a timeline documenting the events of heavy metal in the year 1981.

== Newly formed bands ==
- Anthrax
- Beowülf
- Black 'n Blue
- Chateaux
- Dark Angel
- Easy Action
- Icon
- Jag Panzer
- Jaguar
- Kat
- Kerber
- Kick Axe
- Killer Dwarfs
- King's X (as Sneak Preview)
- Leatherwolf
- Leviticus
- London
- Loudness
- Mercyful Fate
- Metallica
- Mötley Crüe
- Mourning Noise
- Napalm Death
- Oz
- Pagan Altar
- Pantera
- Pretty Maids
- Queensrÿche
- Ratt
- Rock Goddess
- Rough Cutt
- Running Wild
- Saber Tiger
- Sacred Rite
- Saint
- Savage Grace
- Savatage
- Show-Ya
- Skitzo
- Slayer
- Sodom
- Sortilège
- Sound Barrier
- Spider
- Stampede
- Steeler
- Stormwitch
- Suicidal Tendencies
- Tesla
- Tobruk
- Turbo
- Tytan
- United
- V8
- Vandenberg
- Vicious Rumors
- Virgin Steele
- Vixen
- Vulcain
- White Wolf
- White Sister
- Wild Dogs
- Wrathchild America

== Albums & EPs ==
- AC/DC – For Those About to Rock We Salute You
- Accept – Breaker
- The Angels, aka Angel City – Night Attack
- Anvil – Hard 'n' Heavy
- April Wine – The Nature of the Beast
- August Redmoon – Fools Are Never Alone (EP)
- Barón Rojo – Larga vida al Rock and Roll
- Black Angels – Hell Machine
- Blackfoot – Marauder
- Black Sabbath – Mob Rules
- Blue Öyster Cult – Fire of Unknown Origin
- Bow Wow – Hard Dog
- Budgie – Nightflight
- Bullet (Ger) – Execution
- Bodine – Bodine
- Graham Bonnet – Line-Up
- Chinatown - Play it to Death (live)
- Cirith Ungol – Frost and Fire
- Clientelle – Destination Unknown
- Alice Cooper – Special Forces
- Danger (Bel) - Danger
- Dark Star – Dark Star
- Dedringer – Direct Line
- Def Leppard – High 'n' Dry
- Demon – Night of the Demon
- Doc Holliday – Doc Holliday
- Doc Holliday – Doc Holliday Rides Again
- Dokken – Breakin' the Chains (Europe release)
- E.F. Band – Last Laugh Is on You
- Electric Sun – Fire Wind
- Fargo – Frontpage Lover
- Fist (Can) – Fleet Street, aka Thunder in Rock United
- The Friday Rock Show - From BBC Radio 1 – (Compilation, various artists)
- Gaskin – End of the World
- Gillan – Future Shock
- Gillan – Double Trouble
- Girlschool – Hit and Run
- Sammy Hagar – Standing Hampton
- The Handsome Beasts – Beastiality
- Hanoi Rocks – Bangkok Shocks, Saigon Shakes, Hanoi Rocks
- Heavy Metal (soundtrack, various artists)
- Heavy Load – Metal Conquest (EP)
- Helix – White Lace & Black Leather
- Holocaust – The Nightcomers
- Iron Maiden – Killers
- Iron Maiden – Maiden Japan (live EP)
- Joan Jett – Bad Reputation
- Judas Priest – Point of Entry
- Killer – Ladykiller
- Kiss – Music from "The Elder"
- KIX – Kix
- Krokus – Hardware
- Legend – Legend
- Lips (Anvil) – Hard 'n' Heavy
- Loosely Tight – Fightin' Society
- Loudness – The Birthday Eve
- Frank Marino – The Power of Rock'n'Roll
- Mass (Ger) - Swiss Connection
- Molly Hatchet – Take No Prisoners
- More – Warhead
- Mother's Finest – Iron Age
- Mötley Crüe – Too Fast for Love
- Motörhead – No Sleep 'til Hammersmith (Live)
- Motörhead & Girlschool – St. Valentine’s Day Massacre (EP)
- Nightwing – Something in the Air
- No Bros – Heavy Metal Party
- Ted Nugent – Intensities in 10 Cities (live)
- Obús – Prepárate
- Ocean – Ocean
- Ozzy Osbourne – Diary of a Madman
- Overdrive (Swe) – Reflexions (EP)
- Picture – Picture
- Picture – Heavy Metal Ears
- Pat Benatar – Precious Time
- Plasmatics – Beyond the Valley of 1984
- Plasmatics – Metal Priestess (EP)
- Praying Mantis – Time Tells No Lies
- Rage (UK) – Out of Control
- Rainbow – Difficult to Cure
- Raven – Rock Until You Drop
- Revolver – First Shot
- Riot – Fire Down Under
- The Rods – The Rods
- Rose Tattoo – Assault & Battery
- Rush – Moving Pictures
- Rush – Exit...Stage Left (Live)
- Samson – Shock Tactics
- Santers – Shot Down in Flames
- Saracen – Heroes, Saints & Fools
- Saxon – Denim and Leather
- Michael Schenker Group – MSG
- 707 – The Second Album
- Billy Squier – Don't Say No
- Starfighters – Starfighters
- Taipan – Taipan (EP)
- Thin Lizzy – Renegade
- 38 Special – Wild-Eyed Southern Boys
- Triumph – Allied Forces
- Trust – Marche Ou Crève
- Tygers of Pan Tang – Spellbound
- Tygers of Pan Tang – Crazy Nights
- UFO – The Wild, the Willing and the Innocent
- Van Halen – Fair Warning
- Vardis – The World's Insane
- Venom – Welcome to Hell
- Vic Vergat – Down to the Bone
- Viva – What the Hell Is Going On
- Warning – Warning
- Wild Horses – Stand Your Ground
- Whitesnake – Come an' Get It
- Wishbone Ash - Number the Brave
- Y&T – Earthshaker

== Events ==
- September: Iron Maiden's lead singer Paul Di'Anno leaves the band due to his heavy drinking, and is replaced by Bruce Dickinson.
- November: AC/DC's album For Those About to Rock We Salute You is released.

Preceded by 1980	Heavy Metal Timeline; 1981	Succeeded by 1982
