= 1980 in heavy metal music =

This is a timeline documenting the events of heavy metal in the year 1980.

== Newly formed bands ==
- 35007
- Ángeles del Infierno
- Agnostic Front
- Alkatrazz
- Anthem
- Balance
- Barón Rojo
- Battleaxe
- Bitch
- Black Rose
- Blitzkrieg
- Bulldozer
- Destiny
- Die Krupps
- Gene Loves Jezebel
- Grave Digger
- Heaven
- Holy Moses
- Iron Angel
- Joshua
- Killer
- Kruiz
- Lionheart
- Litfiba
- Living Death
- Los Suaves
- Maninnya Blade
- Manowar
- Metal Church
- More
- Ostrogoth
- Ozzy Osbourne (solo career)
- Overkill
- Pokolgép
- Queensrÿche
- Riff
- The Rods
- Rok Mašina
- Sacred Rite
- Saint
- Sound Barrier
- Starfighters
- Stormwitch
- Suicidal Tendencies
- Syron Vanes
- Tank
- Turbo
- Vanadium
- Vixen
- Warlord
- Warning
- White Sister
- Wrathchild

== Albums & EPs ==
- AC/DC - Back in Black
- Accept - I'm a Rebel
- Aerosmith – Greatest Hits
- Alice Cooper - Flush the Fashion
- Angel Witch - Angel Witch
- Atomic Rooster – Atomic Rooster
- A II Z - The Witch of Berkeley (live)
- Beowulf - Slice of Life
- Blackfoot - Tomcattin'
- Black Sabbath - Heaven and Hell
- Blue Öyster Cult - Cultösaurus Erectus
- Bow Wow - Glorious Road
- Bow Wow - Telephone
- Budgie - If Swallowed, Do Not Induce Vomiting (EP)
- Budgie - Power Supply
- Chevy - The Taker
- Cirith Ungol - Frost and Fire
- Def Leppard - On Through the Night
- Diamond Head - Lightning to the Nations
- Ethel the Frog - Ethel the Frog
- Fargo - No Limit
- Fist (UK) - Turn the Hell On
- Fist (Can) - Hot Spikes
- Gamma - Gamma 2
- Gillan - Glory Road
- Girl - Sheer Greed
- Girlschool - Demolition
- Grand Prix - Grand Prix
- The Hunt - Back on the Hunt
- Iron Maiden - Iron Maiden
- Judas Priest - British Steel
- Killer (Bel) - Ready for Hell
- Kiss - Unmasked
- Krokus - Metal Rendez-vous
- Limelight - Limelight
- Magnum - Marauder (live)
- Mama's Boys - Official Album
- Manilla Road - Invasion
- Mass (band))- Angel Power
- Metal for Muthas - (Compilation, various artists)
- Metal for Muthas - Volume II - Cut Loud - (Compilation, various artists)
- Muthas Pride - (Compilation, EP, various artists)
- Metal Explosion - From The Friday Rock Show - (Compilation, various artists)
- Frank Marino & Mahogany Rush - What's Next
- Michael Schenker Group - The Michael Schenker Group
- Molly Hatchet - Beatin' the Odds
- Gary Moore - G-Force
- Motörhead - Ace of Spades
- Mythra - Death & Destiny (EP)
- Ted Nugent - Scream Dream
- Ocean - "A" Live + B (side one is live)
- Ozzy Osbourne - Blizzard of Ozz
- Pat Benatar - Crimes of Passion
- Plasmatics - New Hope for the Wretched
- Quartz - Stand Up and Fight
- Rail - Arrival
- Reckless - Reckless
- The Rods - Rock Hard
- Rush - Permanent Waves
- Samson - Head On
- Saxon - Wheels of Steel
- Saxon - Strong Arm of the Law
- Schoolboys – Singin' Shoutin' (EP)
- Scorpions - Animal Magnetism
- Shakin' Street - Shakin' Street
- Snow - Snow (EP)
- Speed Queen - Speed Queen
- Thin Lizzy - Chinatown
- Triumph - Progressions of Power
- Trust - Répression
- Tygers of Pan Tang - Wild Cat
- UFO - No Place to Run
- Van Halen - Women and Children First
- Vardis - 100 M.P.H. (live)
- Whitesnake - Ready an' Willing
- Whitesnake - Live...in the Heart of the City
- White Spirit - White Spirit
- Wild Horses - Wild Horses, aka The First Album
- Wishbone Ash - Just Testing
- Witchfynde - Give 'Em Hell
- Witchfynde - Stagefright

== Disbandments ==
- Led Zeppelin

== Events ==
- Bon Scott, lead singer of AC/DC, dies at 33 on February 19 after a binge of heavy drinking.
- October: Iron Maiden comp guitarist Dennis Stratton leaves and is replaced by Adrian Smith.
- John Bonham, drummer for Led Zeppelin, dies at 32 on September 25, after a binge of heavy drinking. His death was similar to Bon Scott's, and caused Led Zeppelin to disband.
- April: Brian Johnson joins AC/DC replacing Bon Scott as lead singer.
- May 18: Peter Criss, drummer of Kiss, leaves the band. Eric Carr takes his place.
- Sounds Music Paper Editor Dave Lewis, invents the term New Wave Of British Heavy Metal to accompany an article Geoff Barton wrote on three young British Heavy Metal bands touring together, namely Samson, Iron Maiden and Angelwitch.

Preceded by 1979	Heavy Metal Timeline; 1980	Succeeded by 1981
