= List of Savage Grace (metal band) members =

Savage Grace is an American heavy metal band from Los Angeles, California. Formed in 1981, the group originally consisted of vocalist Kelle Rhoads, guitarist Chris Logue, bassist Brian "Beast" East and drummer Steve Widdick. Logue is the only remaining original member of the band, which currently includes 2024 additions Tasos Lazaris (vocals), Dan Baune (guitar), Cristian Blade (bass) and Hugo Terva (drums).

== History ==
=== 1981–1992 ===
Savage Grace was formed in July 1981 under the name Marquis de Sade by guitarist Chris Logue and bassist Brian "Beast" East. The original lineup featured Kelle Rhoads (brother of then-Ozzy Osbourne guitarist Randy Rhoads) on vocals and Steve Widdick (later Wittig) on drums. The group soon changed its name to Savage Grace, a moniker proposed by Rhoads, as Logue admits that "no one else liked" the original name. Widdick left after a few months and was replaced by Dan Finch III; and in March 1982, Rhoads was fired and replaced by Dwight Cliff. The new lineup recorded the band's first demo that year, one song from which was featured on the Metal Blade's Metal Massacre II, after which Cliff was replaced by John Birk and Kenny Powell joined as second guitarist in early 1983.

By early 1984, Birk had been fired due to creative differences, as well as turning up late for a show (forcing Logue to sing the first few songs of the set). Around the same time, Powell also left to form his own band, Omen. Birk and Powell were replaced by Mike Smith and Kurt Phillips, respectively, although by the time the band started recording its full-length debut album Master of Disguise, the latter had been dismissed. After recording the album as a four-piece, Savage Grace enlisted Mark Marshall of Agent Steel to replace Phillips. In June 1985, ahead of a European tour, Smith left the band and Logue took over vocal duties. East later claimed that Smith "wasn't very self-confident", had problems with "drinking and smoking" and "had a kind of death drive", all of which led to his departure.

After touring in the summer and fall, Finch was forced to leave the band in late 1985 due to "rheumatic problems". He was replaced early the next year by Marc Marcum. East left in the summer, with Logue claiming he was fired as he "wanted to incorporate dance moves into our stage act". He was replaced by Derek Peace from Heir Apparent, with the new lineup recording the EP Ride into the Night in early 1987. After Peace left in the summer of 1987, he was replaced by Neal Delaforce. Marcum was replaced by Marshall Lee Dickerson in 1988. In December 1989, the band relocated to New York, at which point Marshall left and Delaforce was replaced by Mike Breanning. After a string of temporary guitarists, Keith Alexander joined the band for several months in 1991. After recording a ten-track promotional demo, Alexander was replaced later that year by Gene Chapman. The group returned to Los Angeles in April 1992 for a final run of shows, before officially disbanding that September.

=== Since 2009 ===
In January 2009, it was announced that Savage Grace would be returning for a performance at the Keep It True festival in 2010. The lineup was made up of members of another group, Roxxcalibur — namely, guitarists Kalli Coldsmith and Roger Dequis, bassist Mario Lang, and drummer Andreas "Neudi" Neuderth. The lineup parted ways after the shows. After a brief attempt to work with new musicians, Logue disbanded Savage Grace again. The former Roxxcalibur members subsequently reunited with their former vocalist Alexx Stahl under the name Masters of Disguise.

Logue announced a second reformation of Savage Grace in May 2020. In October, Brazilian guitarist Kiko Shred was confirmed as the first member of the new lineup. After a couple of years without an update, it was announced in October 2022 that Logue would in fact be working with guitarist David Sandoval instead. Prior to this, in July, Logue performed with members of local group Voltax at the Keepers of the Flame Metal Fest in Mexico. Around the same time as Sandoval's arrival, the band's lineup was completed with the additions of Gabriel Colón on vocals, Fabio Carito on bass and Marcus Dotta on drums. This lineup recorded the band's first album in over 35 years, Sign of the Cross, which was released in 2023 (although Sandoval is reportedly not featured on the recordings).

By February 2023, the lineup of Savage Grace had changed again, with Logue and Sandoval joined by new vocalist Michael Draveck and bassist Alfredo Hernández, the latter of whom had previously performed with the group as a member of Voltax in July 2022. When the band returned to performing live in April 2024, however, none of the lineup remained — instead, Logue was joined by vocalist Tasos Lazaris, guitarist Dan Baune, bassist Cristian Blade and drummer Hugo Terva.

== Members ==
=== Current ===
| Name | Years active | Instruments | Release contributions |
|---|---|---|---|
| Chris Logue | 1981–1992; 2009–2010; 2020–present | guitar; vocals (1985–1992, 2009–2010) | all Savage Grace releases |
| Tasos Lazaris | 2024–present | vocals | none to date |
| Dan Baune | 2024–present | guitar | none to date |
| Cristian Blade | 2024–present | bass | none to date |
| Hugo Terva | 2024–present | drums | none to date |

=== Former ===
| Name | Years active | Instruments | Release contributions |
|---|---|---|---|
| Brian "Beast" East | 1981–1986 | bass | untitled demo (1982); The Dominatress (1983); Master of Disguise (1985); After the Fall from Grace (1986); The Lost Grace (2010) |
| Kelle Rhoads | 1981–1982 | vocals | none |
| Steve Widdick | 1981 | drums | none |
| Dan Finch III | 1981–1985 | drums | untitled demo (1982); The Dominatress (1983); Master of Disguise (1985); The Lost Grace (2010) |
| Dwight Cliff | 1982–1983 | vocals | untitled demo (1982) |
| Kenny Powell | 1983–1984 | guitar | The Dominatress (1983); The Lost Grace (2010) |
| John Birk | 1983–1984 | vocals | The Dominatress (1983); The Lost Grace (2010) |
| Mike Smith | 1984–1985 | vocals | Master of Disguise (1985) |
| Kurt Phillips | 1984 | guitar | none |
| Mark Marshall | 1984–1989 | guitar | After the Fall from Grace (1986); Ride into the Night (1987) |
| Marc Marcum | 1986–1988 | drums | After the Fall from Grace (1986); Ride into the Night (1987) |
| Derek Peace | 1986–1987 | bass | Ride into the Night (1987) |
| Neal Delaforce | 1987–1988 | bass | none |
| Marshall Lee Dickerson | 1988–1992 | drums | untitled promo (1991) |
| Mike Breanning | 1989–1992 | bass | untitled promo (1991) |
| Keith Alexander (1963–2005) | 1991 | guitar | untitled promo (1991) |
| Gene Chapman | 1991–1992 | guitar | none |
| Eric "Kalli" Coldsmith | 2009–2010 | guitar | none |
| Roger Dequis | 2009–2010 | guitar | none |
| Mario Lang | 2009–2010 | bass | none |
| Andreas "Neudi" Neuderth | 2009–2010 | drums | none |
| Kiko Shred | 2020–2022 | guitar | none |
| Alfredo Hernández | 2022 (stand-in); 2023–2024 | bass | none |
| David Sandoval | 2022–2024 | guitar | none |
| Gabriel Colón | 2022–2023 | vocals | Sign of the Cross (2023) |
| Fabio Carito | 2022–2023 | bass | Sign of the Cross (2023) |
| Marcus Dotta | 2022–2023 | drums | Sign of the Cross (2023) |
| Michael Draveck | 2023–2024 | vocals | none |

=== Stand-in ===
| Name | Years active | Instruments | Details |
|---|---|---|---|
| Jerry Mauleón | 2022 | vocals | The members of Voltax performed with Logue under the name Savage Grace at a Mexican festival in July 2022. |
| Victor Vulcano | 2022 | guitar | The members of Voltax performed with Logue under the name Savage Grace at a Mexican festival in July 2022. |
| Andy Rios | 2022 | drums | The members of Voltax performed with Logue under the name Savage Grace at a Mexican festival in July 2022. |
| Andronikos Maltezos | 2024 | drums | Maltezos filled in for new drummer Hugo Terva at one show in Oldenburg, Germany on May 3, 2024. |

== Lineups ==
| Period | Members | Releases |
|---|---|---|
| July–fall 1981 | Kelly Rhoads — vocals; Chris Logue — guitar; Brian East — bass; Steve Widdick — drums | none |
| Fall 1981–March 1982 | Kelly Rhoads — vocals; Chris Logue — guitar; Brian East — bass; Dan Finch III — drums | none |
| March 1982–February 1983 | Dwight Cliff — vocals; Chris Logue — guitar; Brian East — bass; Dan Finch III — drums | untitled demo (1982) |
| February 1983–early 1984 | John Birk — vocals; Chris Logue — guitar; Kenny Powell — guitar; Brian East — bass; Dan Finch III — drums | The Dominatress (1983); The Lost Grace (2010) |
| Spring–summer 1984 | Mike Smith — vocals; Chris Logue — guitar; Kurt Phillips — guitar; Brian East — bass; Dan Finch III — drums | none |
| Summer 1984 | Mike Smith — vocals; Chris Logue — guitar; Brian East — bass; Dan Finch III — drums | Master of Disguise (1985) |
| Fall 1984–June 1985 | Mike Smith — vocals; Chris Logue — guitar; Mark Marshall — guitar; Brian East — bass; Dan Finch III — drums | none |
| June–late 1985 | Chris Logue — vocals, guitar; Mark Marshall — guitar; Brian East — bass; Dan Finch III — drums | none |
| Early–summer 1986 | Chris Logue — vocals, guitar; Mark Marshall — guitar; Brian East — bass; Marc Marcum — drums | After the Fall from Grace (1986) |
| Summer 1986–summer 1987 | Chris Logue — vocals, guitar; Mark Marshall — guitar; Derek Pearce — bass; Marc Marcum — drums | Ride into the Night (1987) |
| 1987–1988 | Chris Logue — vocals, guitar; Mark Marshall — guitar; Neal Delaforce — bass; Marc Marcum — drums | none |
| 1988–December 1989 | Chris Logue — vocals, guitar; Mark Marshall — guitar; Neal Delaforce — bass; Marshall Lee Dickerson — drums | none |
| December 1989–1991 | Chris Logue — vocals, guitar; Various members — guitar; Mike Breanning — bass; Marshall Lee Dickerson — drums | none |
| 1991 | Chris Logue — vocals, guitar; Keith Alexander — guitar; Mike Breanning — bass; Marshall Lee Dickerson — drums | untitled promo (1991) |
| 1991–September 1992 | Chris Logue — vocals, guitar; Gene Chapman — guitar; Mike Breanning — bass; Marshall Lee Dickerson — drums | none |
Band inactive 1993–2008
| August 2009–September 2010 | Chris Logue — vocals; Kalli Coldsmith — guitar; Roger Dequis — guitar; Mario Lang — bass; Andreas "Neudi" Neuderth — drums | none |
Band inactive 2011–2019
| October 2020–October 2022 | Chris Logue — guitar; Kiko Shred — guitar | none |
| July 2022 (one-off live lineup) | Jerry Mauleón — vocals; Chris Logue — guitar; Victor Vulcano — guitar; Alfredo Hernández — bass; Andy Rios — drums | none |
| October 2022–February 2023 | Gabriel Colón — vocals; Chris Logue — guitar; David Sandoval — guitar; Fabio Carito — bass; Marcus Dotta — drums | Sign of the Cross (2023) |
| February 2023–early 2024 | Michael Draveck — vocals; Chris Logue — guitar; David Sandoval — guitar; Alfredo Hernández — bass | none |
| Spring 2024–present | Tasos Lazaris — vocals; Chris Logue — guitar; Dan Baune — guitar; Cristian Blade — bass; Hugo Terva — drums | none to date |
