= Masters of Disguise =

German speed metal band

Masters of Disguise is a German speed metal band.

The band was named after the 1985 Savage Grace Master of Disguise. The band was made up of members that had played in Roxxcalibur before joining Chris Logue in an incarnation of Savage Grace in 2010; guitarists Eric "Kalli" Coldsmith and Roger Dequis, bass player Mario Lang and drummer Andreas "Neudi" Neuderth. Logue was not a part of Masters of Disguise, which added Alexx Stahl on vocals.

Masters of Disguise released the EP Knutson's Return before their first album Back With A Vengeance came in 2013.

== Discography ==
- Knutson's Return (EP, 2013)
- Back with a Vengeance (2013)
- The Savage and the Grace (2015)
- The Fine Art of Aging Gracefully (EP, 2016)
- Alpha / Omega (2017)

The band also contributed with "Black Witch" to Pounding Metal, a tribute album to Exciter.
