= Master of Disguise =

Master of Disguise may refer to:

- The Master of Disguise, a 2002 American adventure comedy film
- The Master of Disguise (novel), a novel in the Jedi Quest series by Jude Watson
- Master of Disguise (Savage Grace album), 1985
- Master of Disguise (Lizzy Borden album), 1989
- Wario: Master of Disguise, a 2007 platform game
- Master of Disguise: My Secret Life in the CIA, a 1999 non-fiction memoir by Tony Mendez
