= Sortilège (EP) =

EP by Sortilège
- Released: 1983
- Genre: Heavy metal
- Length: 18:19; 42:23 (with bonus tracks)
- Label: Rave-On Records

Sortilège chronology
Sortilège (1983)	Métamorphose (1984)

Sortilège is the debut EP by French heavy metal band Sortilège. It was released by Rave-On Records in 1983.

The CD reissue contains English versions of the songs "Bourreau", "Gladiateur" and "Amazone" as bonus tracks. It also contains three songs from the album Metamorfosis (English release of Métamorphose) which are also in English. Blade Killer (English version of Bourreau) was featured on Rave-On Hits Hard, a compilation disc by various artist published by Rave-On Records.

== Track listing ==
No.	Title	Length
1.	"Amazone"	4:03
2.	"Progéniture"	4:00
3.	"Gladiateur"	2:58
4.	"Sortilège"	3:42
5.	"Bourreau"	3:36

=== Bonus tracks ===
No.	Title	Length
6.	"Blade Killer"	3:36
7.	"Gladiator"	2:56
8.	"The Amazon Warriors"	4:03
9.	"Alien"	2:34
10.	"Death Hymn"	5:30
11.	"Delirium"	5:25

== Personnel ==
- Christian "Zouille" Augustin – vocals
- Stéphane "L'Anguille "Dumont – lead guitar
- Didier "Dem" Demajean – rhythm guitar
- Daniel "Lapin" Lapp – bass
- Jean-Philippe "Bob Snake" Dumont – drums
