= Eye of the Storm (Stormwitch album) =

Studio album by Stormwitch
- Released: 1989
- Recorded: April–May 1989
- Studio: Reel Time Studios, Gerstetten
- Genre: Heavy metal, pop metal, hard rock
- Label: Battle Cry
- Producer: Lee Tarot

Stormwitch chronology
Live in Budapest (1989)	Eye of the Storm (1989)	War of the Wizards (1992)

Eye of the Storm is the fifth studio album by the German heavy metal band Stormwitch, released in 1989. It was the band's final album with their original lineup, and their least "heavy" release to date, featuring several ballads ("I Want You Around", "Take Me Home"). It received mixed reviews.

The album features a guitar played extract of Mozart's "Rondo Ala Turca" (from Mozart's Piano Sonata No. 11).

== Track listing ==
- All songs written by Lee Tarot and Steve Merchant, except where noted.
1. "Paradise" – 3:43
2. "Heart of Ice" – 3:59
3. "I Want You Around" – 4:22
4. "King in the Ring" – 5:09
5. "Tarred and Feathered" – 3:43
6. "Eye of the Storm" – 3:46
7. "Another World Apart" – 3:43
8. "Steel in the Red Light" – 4:09
9. "Rondo Alla Turca" – 3:10 (Mozart)
10. "Take Me Home" – 3:59

Reissued on 7 March 2005 by Battle Cry Records (formerly Iron Glory Records) with these bonus live tracks:

1. "Eye of the Storm"
2. "King in the Ring"
3. "The Beauty and the Beast"
4. "Tears by the Firelight"
5. "Rondo a la Turca"
6. "Dragon's Day"
7. "Tigers of the Sea"
8. "Silent Mood"

== Personnel ==
=== Stormwitch ===
- Andy Mück alias Andy Aldrian – vocals
- Lee Tarot – guitars
- Steve Merchant – guitars
- Andy Hunter – bass
- Pete Lancer – drums

=== Additional personnel ===
- Armin Loser – harmonica, vocal arrangements and additional guitars
- Gunther "Smeagol" Frey – keyboards
- Lily Scherb, Isabelle Ngnoubamdjum, Lisa Wheeler – backing vocals

=== Production ===
- Arranged by Stormwitch
- Produced by Lee Tarot
- Recorded and mixed by Armin Loser
- Recorded and mixed at Reel Time Studios, April–May 1989
