= D'Molls =

US musical group

D'Moll
- Also known as: The Chicago Molls (1984)
- Origin: Chicago, Illinois, United States
- Genres: Heavy metal, glam metal
- Years active: 1984-1991
- Labels: Atlantic, FnA Records, Valley of Fire
- Members: Desi Rexx (vocals, guitar); Jonni Lightfoot (bass, vocals); Van Christensen (drums, vocals); Mick James (lead guitar, vocals)
- Past members: Lizzy Valentine; S. Scot Priest; Billy Dior; Sean Freehill; Jim Bashaw

D'Molls is an American heavy metal and glam metal band. Featuring lead vocalist/guitarist Desi Rexx, bassist Lizzy Valentine, guitarist S. S. Priest, and drummer Billy Dior, the band signed a recording contract with Atlantic Records in the 1980s.

== History ==
Billy McCarthy, a drummer from Chicago, played with the bands Kid Rocker and the Screamin' Mimis. After trying his luck in Los Angeles for five years, McCarthy came back to Chicago in 1984, changed his name to Billy Dior, and founded The Chicago Molls together with Desi Rexx and Lizzy Valentine. The band played hard rock and glam rock. After rehearsing for about a year and performing in The Limelight nightclub in the style of the New York Dolls—even sporting lingerie—the band later toned down this approach when they relocated to Los Angeles at Dior's urging; he found the city to be the best place to pursue a recording contract. Guitarist S. Scot ("S.S.") Priest was still under contract with his other band Diamond Rexx, so he could not follow the band there, and instead was replaced by Sean Freehill.

Two weeks after arriving in Los Angeles, while the band was recording demos in a recording studio, they decided to have a few drinks at a pub down the street. There, they met two girls who were friends with an A&R person, and brought the girls back to the studio with them. When the A&R person came looking for the girls, the bandmates played their demos for him. Although seemingly disinterested at first, he agreed to try and get them a recording contract. Eight months later, the band, now under the name D'Molls, signed a contract with Atlantic Records, with Priest rejoining the band at this time. Two years later, they released their debut album, D'Molls. The video for "777" received some airplay on MTV, but album sales failed to prosper. In 1990, the band released their second and final album on the Atlantic label, Warped. Featuring tracks "Real Love" and "Father Time", it combined simple sounding musical patterns with varying beat speeds. However, vocalist Rexx quit D'Molls and joined The David Lee Roth Band before the album's promotion campaign even got off the ground, and the group disbanded shortly thereafter. They did not release another album until 1996, when Delinquent Records featured the group's third and final album, Beyond D'Valley Of D'Molls, which featured three live tracks as well as previously unreleased studio recordings. There also exists a best of compilation CD, The Best of Everything, which came out in 2007. In 2011 Rexx released Desi Rexx's D'Moll's "D'Sides" on FnA Records.

Dior and Valentine permanently left D'Molls in 1990 after which the band officially disbanded.

In 2004, Dior published a thriller novel under his birth name, Billy McCarthy, The Devil of Shakespeare, inspired in part by his experiences with the band and the 1980s Los Angeles glam rock scene. In 2015, he sued Poison for copyright infringement on several Poison hit songs, including, "Talk Dirty To Me," for which the band failed to credit him as co-writer. Dior had played with Poison guitarist C.C. Deville when both were members of Kid Rocker and Screamin' Mimis. Poison ultimately settled with Dior out of court for an undeclared sum. In 2017, McCarthy published his sophomore effort at writing, Beat Me Till I'm Famous, an autobiographical memoir of his experience as a professional musician in the 1980s, most of which covers the entire D'Molls story. McCarthy is the executive producer of Ferocious Drummers, a feature documentary on drummers due in 2025.

== Discography ==
=== Studio albums ===
- D'Molls (1988)
- Warped (June 28, 1990)
- Beyond D'Valley Of D'Molls (1997)
- Desi Rexx's D'Molls "D'Sides" (2011) FnA Records

=== Compilation albums ===
- The Best of Everything (2007)

=== Singles ===
- "All I Want" (1988)
- "777" (1988)

== Former members ==
- S. Scot ("S.S.") Priest - lead guitar (1984-1985; 1986-1991)
- Sean Freehill - lead guitar (1985)
- Lizzy Valentine - bass guitar (1984-1991)
- Billy Dior - drums (1984-1991)
