= Larmes de Héros =

Studio album by Sortilège
- Released: 1986
- Genre: Heavy metal
- Length: 45:49; 66:02 (with bonus tracks)
- Label: Madrigal, Steamhammer

Sortilège chronology
Live Breaking Sound Festival (bootleg) (1984)	Larmes de Héros (1986)

Larmes de Héros is the second studio album by French heavy metal band Sortilège, released in 1986.

== History ==
With the success of Métamorphose, Sortilège was able to participate in several music festivals in France, Germany and the Netherlands, alongside some of the greatest names of hard rock. After that, it was clear that Sortilège became one of the best French heavy metal bands of its time. But the Parisians were still angry at their record company, dissatisfied with the way they were distributed. The second LP, Larmes de Héros, was published in 1986. Like its predecessor, it was recorded in Germany. An English version was recorded at the same time, intended primarily for the German market (but in fact it was the French version that sold best in Germany).

On this second LP, Sortilège proved they were not a group designed to keep running in place, quite the contrary. Larmes de Héros is very different from its predecessor. The music here is much more mature, it is felt even in the texts. Listening to this album feels like that Sortilège paid particular attention to their new songs.

With Larmes de Héros, Sortilège recorded a perfect album. While the music is less aggressive, the melodic aspect is absolutely unstoppable. Christian Augustin never sang as well, it really reaches the heights on this album, perfectly served by Stephane Dumont being more inspired than ever in creating good riffs.

Alas, Larmes de Héros received many critical acclaims, the public response was less enthusiastic, part of the public haven't accepted loss of aggressiveness. Tired of the lack of public support, difficulties encountered in relation to record companies, the members decided to disband. A sad end for a group that had just released the masterpiece of French heavy metal.

Bonus tracks on album are English versions of Le Dernier Des Travaux D'Hercules, La Hargne Des Tordus, Mourir Pour Une Princesse and Marchand D'Hommes

== Track listing ==
No.	Title	Length
1.	"La Hargne Des Tordus"	4:45
2.	"Chasse Le Dragon"	4:47
3.	"Le Dernier Des Travaux D'Hercules"	3:46
4.	"Quand Un Aveugle Rêve"	6:37
5.	"Mourir Pour Une Princesse"	5:02
6.	"La Montagne Qui Saigne"	5:15
7.	"Marchand D'Hommes"	6:46
8.	"Messager"	4:27
9.	"La Huitième Couleur De L'arc-en-ciel"	4:24

=== Bonus tracks ===
No.	Title	Length
10.	"Sagittarius"	3:46
11.	"Elephant Man"	4:44
12.	"Win Her Heart"	5:02
13.	"Flesh And Bones"	6:41

== Personnel ==
- Christian Augustin – vocals
- Stéphane Dumont – lead guitar
- Didier Demajean – rhythm guitar
- Daniel Lapp – bass
- Bob Dumont – drums
