= Atomic Arena =

Studio album by Barren Cross
- Released: 1988
- Genre: Christian metal, heavy metal
- Length: 43:12
- Label: Enigma
- Producer: Dino Elefante; John Elefante

Barren Cross chronology
Rock for the King (1986)	Atomic Arena (1988)	State of Control (1989)

Professional ratings
Review scores
Source	Rating
Campus Life	

Atomic Arena is a 1988 heavy metal album released by the Christian metal band Barren Cross. The album was produced by John Elefante of Kansas fame and his brother Dino. Its lyrical content deals with social issues such as suicide and abortion, and spiritual issues such as cults and the nature of God.

== Track listing ==
1. "Imaginary Music" - 4:26
2. "Killers of the Unborn" - 3:28
3. "In the Eye of the Fire" - 4:27
4. "Terrorist Child" - 3:30
5. "Close to the Edge" - 4:55
6. "Dead Lock" - 4:18
7. "Cultic Regimes" - 2:48
8. "Heaven or Nothing" - 4:10
9. "King of Kings" - 3:30
10. "Living Dead" - 6:50

== Credits ==
=== Band ===
- Mike Lee - lead vocals and acoustic guitar
- Ray Parris - rhythm and lead guitar, acoustic guitars, background vocals
- Steve Whitaker - drums, background vocals
- Jim LaVerde - bass guitar, taurus synthesizer pedals, background vocals

=== Additional musicians ===
- Dino Elefante - additional vocals
- John Elefante - keyboards, additional vocals
