= Rated Rexx =

Studio album by Diamond Rexx
- Released: 1990
- Genre: Glam metal Heavy metal
- Length: 41:40
- Label: Red Light
- Producer: Bruce Pederson

Diamond Rexx chronology
| Land of the Damned (1986) | Rated Rexx (1990) | Rexx Erected (2001) |

Professional ratings
Review scores
| Source | Rating |
|---|---|
| Allmusic | 2.5/5 stars |

Rated Rexx is the third studio album by American heavy metal/glam metal band Diamond Rexx. It was released by Red Light Records in 1990, and reissued by Crash Music Inc. in 2002.

== Track listing ==
All tracks by S. St. Lust and Nasti Habits, except where noted.

1. "Instant Medication" – 3:48
2. "Lady's Nite" – 3:52 (Johnny Angel, Habits)
3. "Easy Kill" – 3:37 (Johnny Cottone, Lust, Habits)
4. "How Do You Know" – 3:25 (Dave Andre, Lust, Habits)
5. "Heartbreak City" – 3:19 (Angel, Habits, Chrissy Salem)
6. "Don't Let It Get You Down" – 2:32
7. "4 Letter Word" – 3:33
8. "Color Red" – 4:17
9. "Guillotine" – 3:19 (Angel, Habits, Salem)
10. "Lock It Up" – 4:35
11. "Sleaze Patrol" – 3:04
12. "Bad Attitude" – 2:31 (Angel, Habits)

== Personnel ==
=== The band ===
- Nasti Habits – Lead vocals
- Johnny L. Angel – Guitar, backing vocals
- Chrissy Salem – Bass, backing vocals
- Tim Tully – Drums, backing vocals

=== Production ===
- Bruce Pederson – Producer
- Mark Nawara – Executive producer
