= State of Control =

Studio album by Barren Cross
- Released: 1989
- Genre: Christian metal, heavy metal
- Length: 48:05
- Label: Enigma Records
- Producer: Dino Elefante; John Elefante

Barren Cross chronology
Atomic Arena (1988)	State of Control (1989)	Hotter Than Hell Live! (1990)

State of Control is a 1989 heavy metal album released by the Christian metal band Barren Cross. The album was produced by John Elefante and his brother Dino Elefante.

== Track listing ==
1. "State of Control" - 3:52
2. "Out of Time" - 4:09
3. "Cryin' Over You" - 4:53
4. "A Face in the Dark" - 3:55
5. "The Stage of Intensity" - 6:36
6. "Hard Lies" - 4:18
7. "Inner War" - 4:09
8. "Love at Full Volume" - 2:28
9. "Bigotry Man (Who Are You)" - 4:42
10. "Two Thousand Years" - 7:09
11. "Your Love Gives" - 3:54
12. "Escape in the Night" - 3:54

== Credits ==
=== Band ===
- Mike Lee - lead vocals and acoustic guitar
- Ray Parris - rhythm and lead guitar, acoustic guitars, background vocals
- Steve Whitaker - drums, background vocals
- Jim LaVerde - bass guitar, taurus synthesizer pedals, background vocals

=== Additional musicians ===
- Dino Elefante - additional vocals
- John Elefante - keyboards, additional vocals
