= Golden Gates =

EP by Diamond Rexx
- Released: 1989
- Genre: Glam metal Heavy metal
- Length: 20:11
- Label: Red Light
- Producer: Mark Nawara

Professional ratings
Review scores
Source	Rating
Allmusic	2/5 stars

Golden Gates is an EP by American heavy metal/glam metal band Diamond Rexx. It was released by Red Light Records in 1989.

== Track listing ==
1. "Cold and Sorry" - 3:07
2. "Crazy from Love" - 2:29
3. "Golden Gates" - 3:48
4. "Put Em on Ice" - 4:13
5. "Lady in My Pocket" - 4:01
6. "Cat House" - 2:46

== Personnel ==
=== The band ===
- Nasti Habits – Vocals
- S. Scott Priest – Guitar
- Chrissy Salem – Bass
- Billy J Nychay – Drums, Percussion
  - All Guitar played by John Luckhaupt (Johnny L Angel)

=== Production ===
- Mark Nawara – Producer
- Gary Loizzo – Engineer
- John Luckhaupt – Engineer, recording
- Jim Haupert & Mike Slawin - Photographers
