= Rexx Erected =

Studio album by Diamond Rexx
- Released: November 6, 2001
- Genre: Alternative metal
- Label: Crash Music Inc.
- Producer: Nasti Habits

Diamond Rexx chronology
Rated Rexx (1990)	Rexx Erected (2001)	The Evil (2002)

Professional ratings
Review scores
Source	Rating
Allmusic	2.5/5 stars

Rexx Erected is the fourth studio album by American heavy metal/glam metal band Diamond Rexx. It was released by Crash Music Inc. on November 6, 2001.

Diamond Rexx became an alternative metal band in this album.

== Track listing ==
All tracks written by Diamond Rexx, except where noted.

1. "The Evil" – 3:04
2. "No Pain (No Gain)" – 3:25
3. "Kill Yourself" – 4:45
4. "No Effect" – 4:22 (Diamond Rexx, Dave Andre)
5. "One Step Away" – 4:27
6. "Is That All" – 2:17
7. "Medicine Man" – 3:20
8. "Fire" – 3:01
9. "Watch Your Step" – 3:13
10. "Bang! Bang!" – 3:22
11. "One More Day..." – 1:55

== Personnel ==
=== The band ===
- Nasti Habits - Lead vocals
- S.S. Priest – Guitar
- Basil T."Baz" Cooper – Bass
- Billy Nychay - Drums

=== Additional musicians ===
- Laura Brejcha – Backing vocals
- Sean Johnson – Backing vocals

=== Production ===
- Nasti Habits – Producer, mixing
