= Rock for the King =

Studio album by Barren Cross
- Released: 1986
- Genre: Christian metal, heavy metal
- Length: 33:48
- Label: Star Song

Barren Cross chronology
Believe (1985)	Rock for the King (1986)	Atomic Arena (1988)

Rock for the King is a 1986 heavy metal album released by the Christian metal band Barren Cross.

== Track listing ==
1. "Dying Day" - 3:27
2. "He Loves You" - 4:37
3. "It's All Come True" - 4:05
4. "Believe" - 2:16
5. "Going Nowhere" - 3:49
6. "Rock For The King" - 5:02
7. "Give Your Life" - 2:49
8. "Just A Touch" - 3:29
9. "Light The Flame" - 5:34

== Personnel ==
- Mike Lee – lead vocals and acoustic guitar
- Ray Parris – rhythm and lead guitar, acoustic guitars, background vocals
- Steve Whitaker – drums, background vocals
- Jim LaVerde – bass guitar, taurus synthesizer pedals, background vocals
