= 8186 Live =

Live album by Loudness
- Released: November 10, 1986
- Recorded: April 4, 1986
- Venue: Yoyogi Olympic Pool Stadium, Tokyo
- Genre: Heavy metal
- Length: 91:16
- Label: ATCO; WEA Japan
- Producer: Loudness, Tokugen Yamamoto, Toshi Nakashita

Loudness chronology
Lightning Strikes (1986)	8186 Live (1986)	Hurricane Eyes (1987)

Professional ratings
Review scores
Source	Rating
AllMusic	4/5 stars
Collector's Guide to Heavy Metal	5/10
Kerrang!	2/5 stars

8186 Live is the second live album by the Japanese band Loudness. It was recorded and released in Japan only in 1987 simultaneously in 3 formats; double vinyl LP with a 7-inch EP (3 disc set), double CD and double cassette tape.

== Track listing ==
Disc one
No.	Title	Length
1.	"Loudness"	5:35
2.	"Rock Shock"	5:40
3.	"Dark Desire"	4:16
4.	"Streetlife Dreams"	5:30
5.	"Crazy Doctor"	4:15
6.	"Geraldine"	5:07
7.	"Bass Solo/Drum Solo"	9:33
8.	"Shadows of War (Ashes in the Sky)"	6:47

Disc two
No.	Title	Length
1.	"Let It Go"	4:24
2.	"One Thousand Eyes"	5:39
3.	"Face to Face"	3:55
4.	"Ares' Lament"	7:34
5.	"In the Mirror"	3:27
6.	"Guitar Solo"	5:05
7.	"Crazy Nights"	5:15
8.	"Speed"	7:51
9.	"Farewell"	1:22

== Personnel ==
Loudness

- Minoru Niihara – vocals
- Akira Takasaki – guitars
- Masayoshi Yamashita – bass
- Munetaka Higuchi – drums

Production

- Masahiro Miyazawa – engineer
- Masashi Goto – assistant engineer
- Bill Freesh – mixing
- George Azuma, Sam Nagashima – coordinators
- Tokugen Yamamoto, Toshi Nakashita – executive producers
