= Mortem =

Peruvian death metal band

Mortem is a death metal band formed in 1986 in Lima, Peru.

== Biography ==
Mortem is one Peru's death metal scene's oldest and most celebrated bands. Founded by Fernán Nebiros and Alvaro Amduscias in July–August 1986, Mortem has been through several line-up changes. They toured South America and released a number of demos. Mortem released their debut album, Demon Tales, in 1996, after signing with Peruvian label Huasipungo Records. Demon Tales was the second Peruvian metal album ever released, following Hadez's Aquelarre in 1993. After releasing Demon Tales, Mortem signed to German label Merciless Records, making Mortem the first Peruvian metal band to sign to a European label.

In 2003 and 2004, Mortem became the first Peruvian metal band to tour Europe and the United States. In 2007, with four full-length studio albums and one live album, Mortem achieved underground status and loyal support across continents. Mortem has performed with Sarcófago, Immolation, Sadistic Intent, Possessed, and Slayer, among others.

== Line-up ==
- Fernán Nebiros – guitar, vocals (1986 – present)
- Alvaro Amduscias – drums, bass, vocals (1986–1998, 2000 – present)
- Christian Jhon – guitar (1999–1999, 2012–present)
- José "Chino Morza" Okamura – bass ( 1991- 1991, 2000- 2000, 2012 - present)

=== Former members ===
- Pablo "Genocidio" Rey – guitar, bass (1988–1991)
- José "Mortuorio" Sagar – drums (1987–1988)
- Héctor Panty – guitar (1987–1988)
- Hugo "Satanarchust" Calle – drums (1988–1989)
- Janio "Tremolón" Cuadros – guitar (1989–1993), live guitar (2000–2003)
- Javier "Manthas" Gamarra – bass (1991–1992)
- José "Chino Morza" Okamura – live vocals, bass (1991–1991, 2000 - 2000)
- Carlos Verástegui – bass (1992–1995)
- Jaime García – drums (1998–2000)
- Sandro García – guitar (1998–1999)
- Juan C. Muro – bass (1995 – 2012)
- Wilber Rosán – guitar (1993–1998, 1999 – 2012)

== Discography ==
=== Studio albums ===
- 1995: Demon Tales
- 1998: The Devil Speaks in Tongues
- 2000: Decomposed by Possession
- 2005: De Natura Daemonum
- 2016: Deinós Nekrómantis

=== EPs ===
- 2006: Devoted To Evil

=== Demos ===
- 1989: Evil Dead
- 1991: Superstition
- 1992: Vomit of the Earth
- 1993: Unearth the Buried Evil

=== Live albums ===
- 2007: Demonios Atacan Los Angeles
