= Vastator =

Chilean speed metal band

- Origin: Santiago, Chile
- Genres: Speed metal
- Years active: 1986–1990, 1998–present
- Members: Sr. Díaz; Gerardo Barrenechea; Criss Nelson; Richard Pilnik
- Past members: Sergio Bustamante; Francisco Gutiérrez

Vastator is a Chilean speed metal band formed in Santiago in 1986.

== Band members ==
=== Current members ===
- Sr. Díaz (vocals) (1986–present)
- Gerardo Barrenechea (drums) (1986–present)
- Criss Nelson (bass and keyboards) (2018–present)
- Richard Pilnik (guitar) (2016–present)

=== Past members ===
- Peyote Barrera (bass) (1986–2018)
- Sergio Bustamante (guitar) (1986–2001)
- Francisco Gutiérrez (guitar) (2001–2007)

== Discography ==
=== Albums ===
- Guía Para Odiar a tu Prójimo (1998)
- Night of San Juan (2001)
- Hell Only Knows (2007)
- Machine Hell (2011)
- Gentlemen's Club (2019)

=== Demos ===
- El Profanador (1987)
- Inconsciencia Asesina (1988)
- Máxima Entropía (1989)
