= Risk (band) =

German metal band

- Origin: Witten, Germany
- Genres: Thrash metal, speed metal, heavy metal, power metal, groove metal
- Years active: 1986–1993
- Labels: Steamhammer, SPV

Risk was a German thrash metal band from Witten. Founded in 1986, they notably released five albums and one EP on Steamhammer Records.

== Discography ==
- The Daily Horror News (... From the Lost Side of the World) (1988, Steamhammer Records)
- Hell's Animals (1989, Steamhammer Records)
- Ratman EP (1989, Steamhammer Records)
- Dirty Surfaces (1990, Steamhammer Records)
- The Reborn (1992, Steamhammer Records)
- Turpitude (1993, Steamhammer Records)
