= Maninnya Blade =

The Swedish thrash metal pioneers Maninnya Blade was formed in the early 1980s, and is now considered to be one of the first thrash metal bands from Sweden.

The single "The Barbarian/Ripper Attack" (Platina Records, SE) were released in 1984

The full-length vinyl "Merchants In Metal" (Killerwatt Records, UK) in 1986 - prior to splitting up.

On the 2001 the vinyl compilation "A Demonic Mistress from the Past" (Stormbringer Records, SE) was released with earlier unreleased demo tracks as well as the single "The Barbarian/Ripper Attack" included.

In 2006 "Undead, Unborn, Alive" 2CD compilation (Marquee Records, BR) was released with all "Merchants in Metal" tracks, the single "The Barbarian/Ripper Attack", unreleased demo tracks and live tracks from the 2002 temporary reunion gig at 2000 Decibel Festival in Bengtsfors, Sweden

The band has reunited in 2025 and can be found on streaming platforms, FB, IG, Tiktok, live on stage - with classic and new material in process
