= Stronger Than Heaven =

Studio album by Stormwitch
- Released: 1986
- Recorded: January–February 1986
- Studio: Spygel-Studio, Kirchheim unter Teck, West Germany
- Genre: Heavy metal
- Length: 37:12
- Label: Scratch/GAMA International
- Producer: Stormwitch

Stormwitch chronology
Tales of Terror (1985)	Stronger Than Heaven (1986)	The Beauty and the Beast (1988)

Stronger Than Heaven is the studio third album by the German heavy metal band Stormwitch, released in 1986. It is the third album to have tracks from it used in the compilation Priest of Evil of 1998. The track "Ravenlord" was covered by HammerFall as a bonus track on their debut album Glory to the Brave. An alternate acoustic version of the song "Rats in the Attic" was recorded at Talk Heavy Radio / Münster and can be heard on the band's website.

== Track listing ==
All songs written by Lee Tarot, except for where noted.

Side one

1. "Intro" – 0:31
2. "Rats in the Attic" – 3:06
3. "Eternia" (Tarot, Steve Merchant) – 3:59
4. "Jonathan's Diary" – 7:23
5. "Slave to Moonlight" – 4:03

Side two

6. "Stronger Than Heaven" – 4:38
7. "Ravenlord" – 3:41
8. "Allies of the Dark" – 4:18
9. "Dorian Gray" – 5:39

Reissued on CD in 2004 by Battlecry Records (formerly Iron Glory Records) with these bonus tracks:

11. "Children of the Night"
12. "Buried Alive"
13. "Long Boats on the Horizon"
14. "Beware the Demons"

== Personnel ==
Stormwitch

- Andy Mück alias Andy Aldrian – vocals
- Lee Tarot – guitars
- Steve Merchant – guitars
- Ronny Pearson – bass
- Pete Lancer – drums

Production

- Tom Krüger – engineer, mixing
- Batze Kramer – engineer
