= Chariot (English band) =

Chariot is an English heavy metal band. First playing in the 1980s, the band made a comeback in the 2000s.

== History ==
The band formed in 1981 in London. They were a part of the new wave of British heavy metal, but as the wave faded, they were only signed to Shades Records, affiliated with a local record store Shades. Chariot's debut album was 1984's The Warrior followed by the EP All Alone Again the next year and Burning Ambition one year after that later. Having played the 1987 Reading Festival, the band called it quits, though three of the four started Dirty Deeds in 1994. In 2006, Chariot resurfaced with the album Behind the Wire.

== Discography ==
- The Warrior (1984)
- Burning Ambition (1986)
- Behind the Wire (2006)
- In the Blood (2012)
- Demons & Angels (2014)
- The New Horizon Dawns (2018)
