= Land of the Damned =

Studio album by Diamond Rexx
- Released: December 1986
- Recorded: Tone Zone Studios, Chicago, Illinois
- Genre: Glam metal
- Length: 36:03
- Label: Island
- Producer: Mark Nawara

Diamond Rexx chronology
| Land of the Damned (1986) | Rated Rexx (1990) |

Professional ratings
Review scores
| Source | Rating |
|---|---|
| Allmusic | 3/5 stars |
| Kerrang! | 1/5 stars |

Land of the Damned is the debut album by American heavy metal/glam metal band Diamond Rexx. It was released by Island Records in 1986, and is the band's sole major label release. It was reissued in 2007 by Crash Music Inc. and in 2008 by Massacre Poland. A video was made for "Wish I Was Rich" .

== Track listing ==
All tracks by S. St. Lust, Nasti Habits, and Dave Andre, except where noted.

1. "Land of the Damned" – 3:13 (Lust, Habits)
2. "All I Need" – 3:07 (Johnny Cottone, Habits, Lust)
3. "Cuz I Wancha" – 3:13 (Lust, Habits)
4. "Wish I Was Rich" – 3:47
5. "Don't Start Without Me" – 4:01 (Lust, Habits)
6. "Up and Down" – 3:10 (Lust, Habits)
7. "Rock Gun" – 4:02
8. "B.A.T.S." – 4:41
9. "Kick in Your Face" – 3:31
10. "Life and Death" – 3:18

== Personnel ==
=== The band ===
- Nasti Habits – Lead vocals
- S. St. Lust – Guitar, backing vocals
- Dave Andre – Guitar, backing vocals
- Johnny Cottone – Drums, backing vocals

=== Crew ===
- Billy Cafero
- Chris Johnson
- Billy Johnson
- Lynn Drake

=== Production ===
- Mark Nawara – Producer
- Roger Heiss – Engineer
- Roy Montroy – Assistant engineer
- Denny Nowak – Mixing
- Larry Bishop – Production assistant
