= Barren Cross =

American Christian metal band

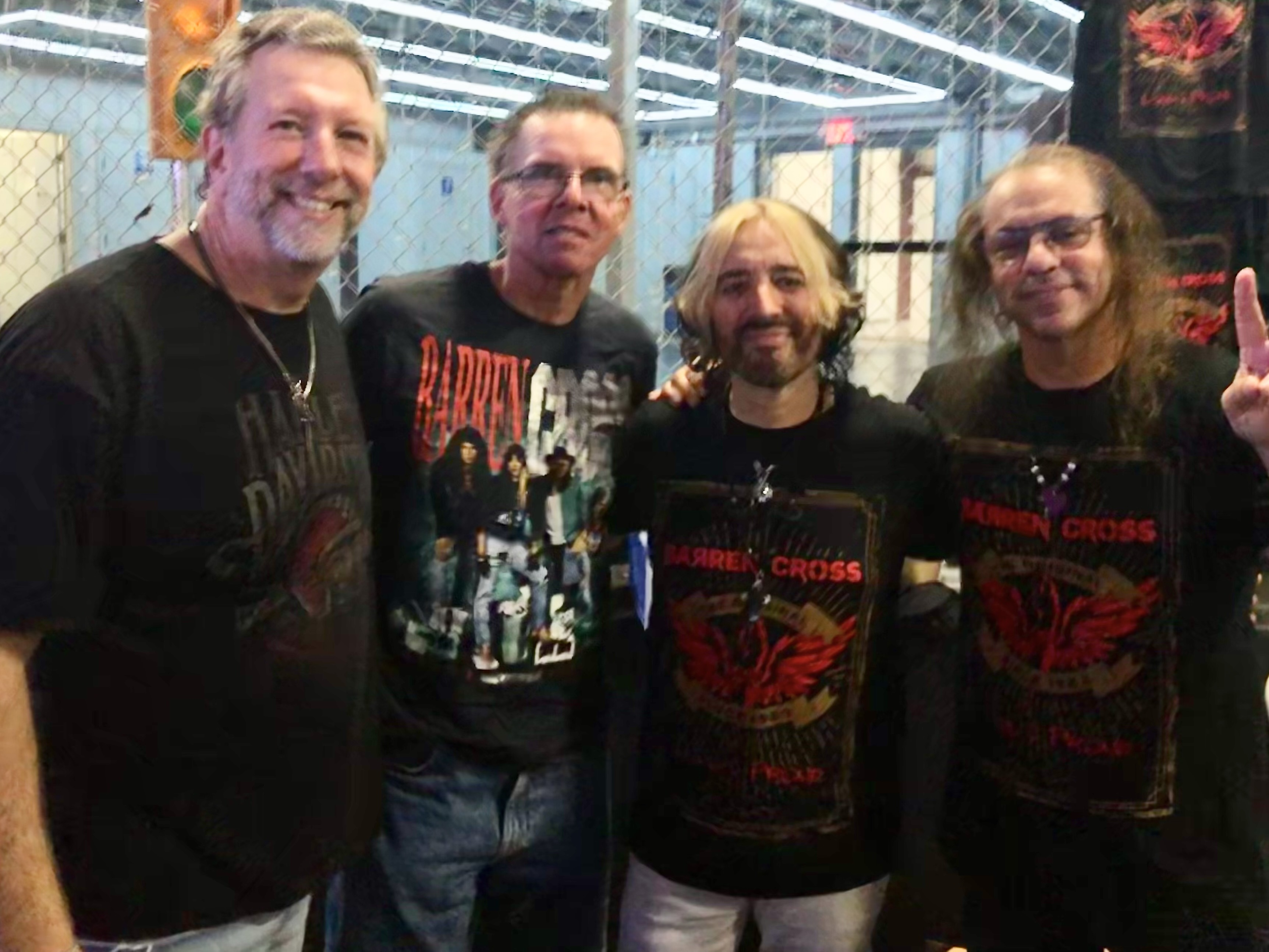

Background information
- Genres: Christian metal, heavy metal, hard rock
- Years active: 1983–1994, 2010–2013
- Labels: Star Song, Enigma, Medusa, Rugged
- Members: Mike Lee (Michael Drive); Jim LaVerde; Ray Parris
- Past members: Steve Whitaker
- Website: barrencross.com

Barren Cross is an American Christian metal band formed in Los Angeles in 1983. It was formed by Michael "Mike Lee" Drive (vocals), Ray Parris (guitar), Jim LaVerde (bass), and Steve Whitaker (drums). The band released six albums from 1986 to 1994, and reunited for a few shows in the 2010s with plans to record a new album.

== History ==
Over the years, Barren Cross has seen their share of successes since their start out of high school in 1982. The band originally consisted of high school friends Ray Parris (guitar) and Steve Whitaker (drums). By 1984, bassist Jim LaVerde and vocalist Michael Drive (originally Mike Lee) were added.

In 1985, their first EP, Believe, an independent release, garnered national attention and trademarked their raw metal sound. The following year, Star Song Records released their first album, Rock for the King. 1988 saw a second album, Atomic Arena, this time on Enigma Records (now Capitol Records) alongside labelmates Poison, Ratt, Slayer, Stryper, and others. As a follow-up to their Enigma debut, they released State of Control in 1989. Hotter than Hell Live!, a live album on Medusa Records, was released the following year. A few months later, Rock for the King was reissued and has since become a collector's item.

Subsequent to lead singer Mike Lee (now Michael Drive) pursuing another project (becoming lead vocalist for the band Bare Bones), vocalist Vincent Van Voltenburg (Vin Van Volt) of the Christian metal quartet Full Armor was introduced as the new lead singer and took the reins for all live performances during the 1990 "State of Control World Tour" which included shows in Ireland, Germany, Austria, and the U.S. Soon after the tour ended, the new lineup with Ray Parris (guitar), Jim LaVerde (bass), Vin Van Volt (vocals), and David LaVai (drums) was to begin writing for the next record which might have included a Vin Van Volt song called "Pain Reliever". The song, a new sound for Barren Cross, was well received by audiences on the State of Control tour.

The record with this new lineup would never materialize, and Barren Cross went on hiatus until their last full-length release to date, the stylistically evolved Rattle Your Cage, released on Rugged Records in 1994, with lead singer Michael Drive returning at the helm and featuring all of the original band members.

Barren Cross earned some airplay on VH1, MTV, radio stations, and several label and metal music compilations. In 1989, the band appeared on The Morton Downey Show alongside members of Kiss and Anthrax. For over twenty years, international music magazines have featured the band consistently. Besides six major label releases, five of them full-length, Barren Cross was known for relentless touring.

=== Reunion ===
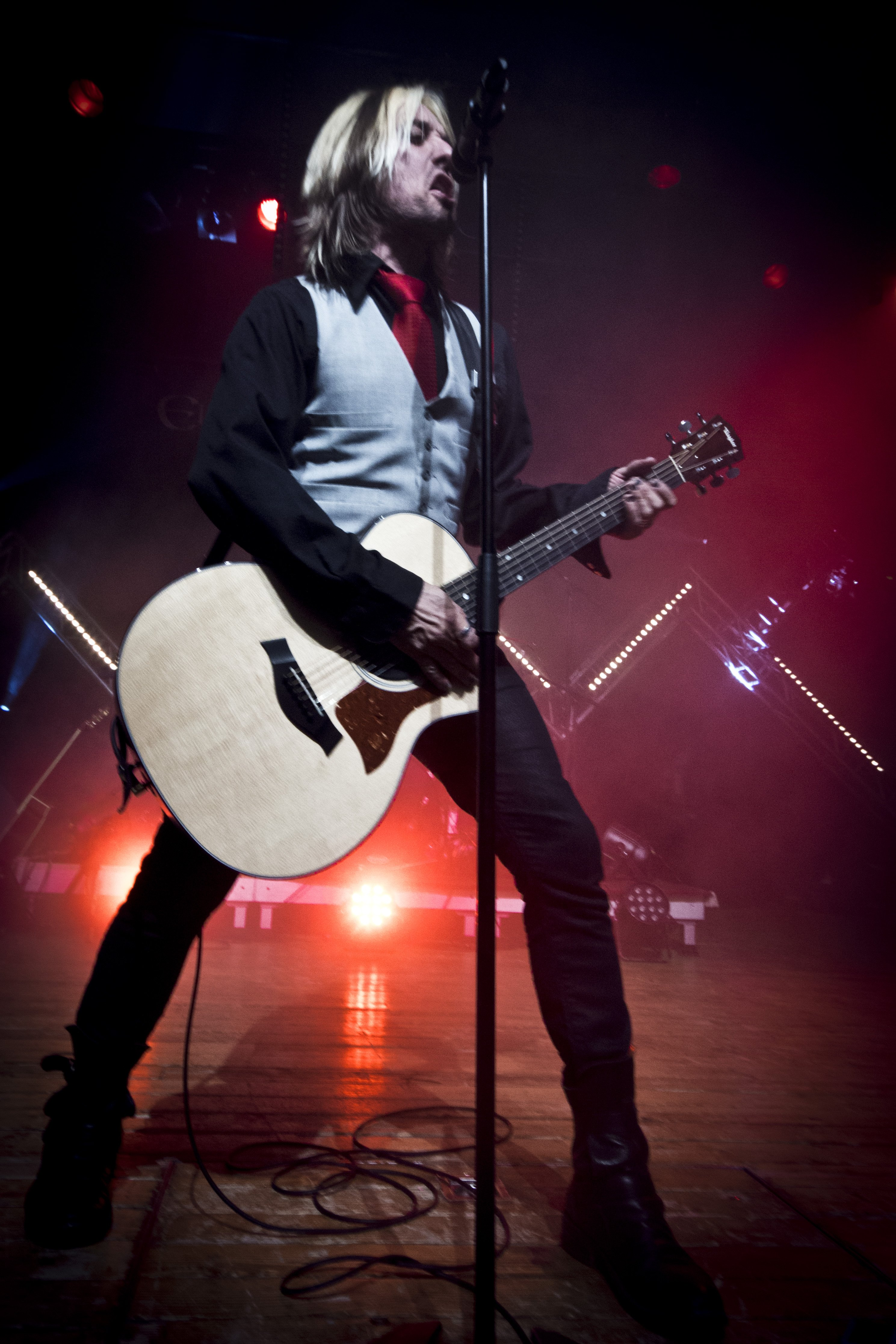
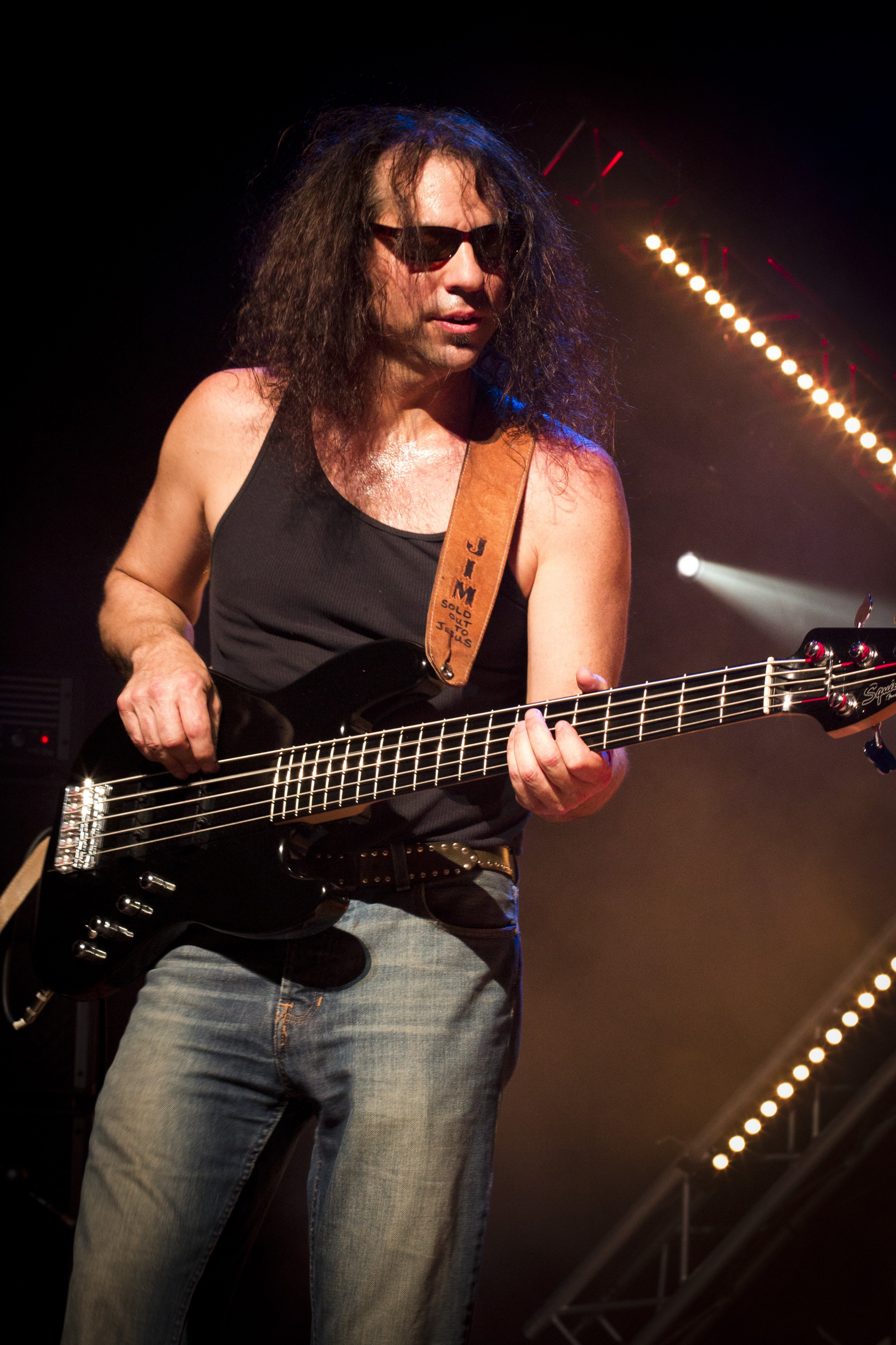
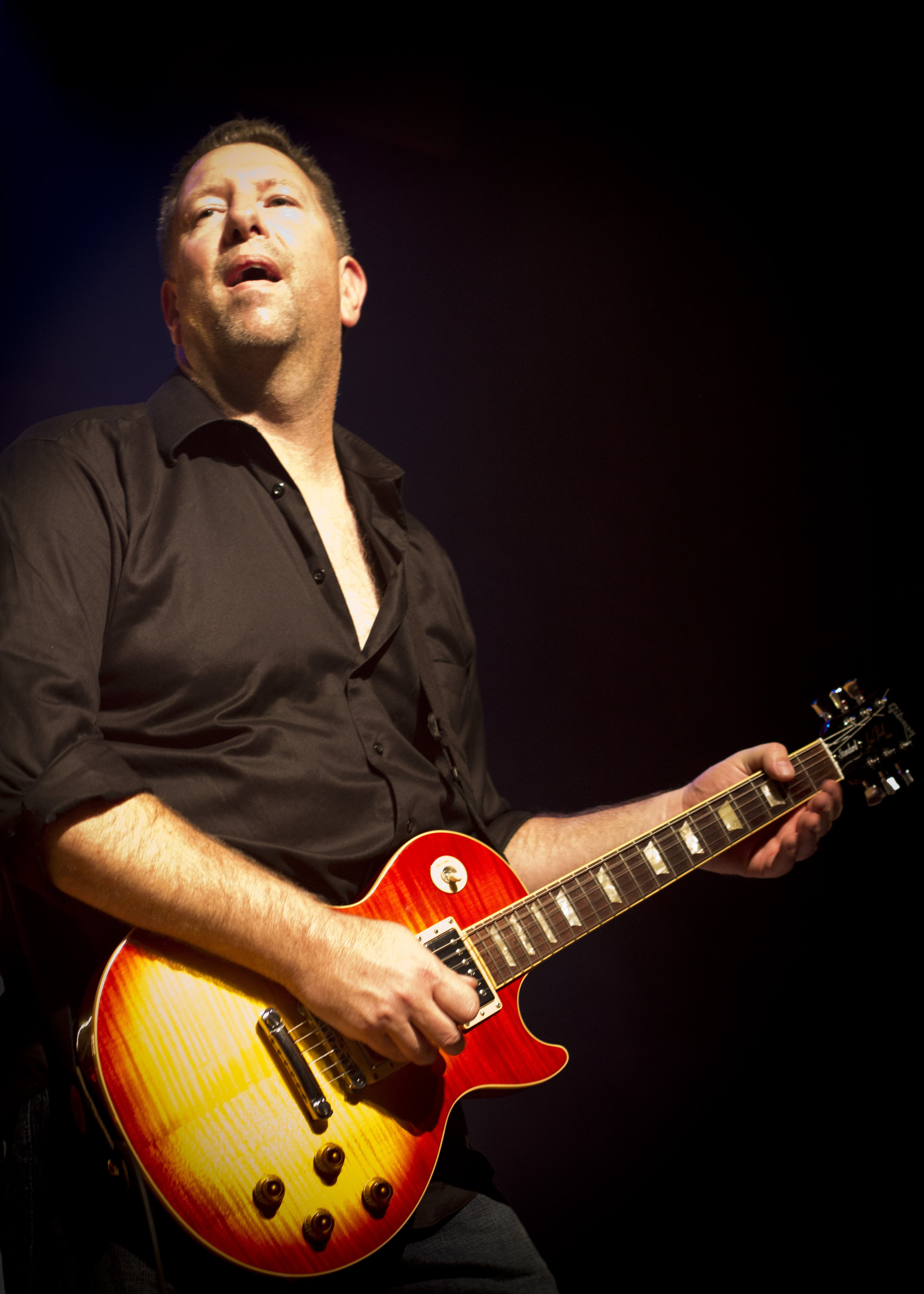
Barren Cross at Elements of Rock 2012

On May 8, 2008, the band officially announced they would be returning to the music scene, launching MySpace and Facebook pages for the band and remaining active in communication. The band initially announced a reunion which included original lead singer Michael Drive. A short-term reunion with a few international reunion concerts ensued, with announcements of a return to the recording studio with new music.

In 2010, Barren Cross announced a special re-release of their debut album, Believe EP, marking the 25-year anniversary of its original 1985 independent release. Michael Drive has since appeared on Barren Cross' most recent live performances. In 2013, Barren Cross released a live album, Birth Pangs, which is a recording of their performance at Elements of Rock the previous year.

Drummer Steve Whitaker died from amyotrophic lateral sclerosis on November 6, 2025, at the age of 62.

== Musical style ==
Musically, Barren Cross is often compared to Iron Maiden, mainly due to the similarity of the vocals between Mike Lee and Iron Maiden frontman Bruce Dickinson. Lyrically, the band is noted for its stance on a number of social issues. Their songs addressed, from a Christian worldview, personal and societal issues such as suicide, abortion, terrorism, and prejudice. In 1985, they contributed to the Last Days Ministries' anti-abortion song Fight the Fight.

== Members ==
=== Original members ===
- Ray Parris – guitars, backing vocals
- Steve Whitaker – drums, backing vocals (died 2025)
- Michael "Mike Lee" Drive – lead vocals, acoustic guitar
- Jim LaVerde – bass, backing vocals

=== Guest musicians ===
- Dean Kohn - vocals (2008-2012) (died 2021)
- Christine Whitaker – keyboards (live) (1990)
- Vince Mendoza - guitars (live) (1990)
- Alaysius Collado - vocals (live) (1990)
- Vince Van Voltenburg – vocals (live) (1990)
- David LaVai - drums (live) (1990)
- Keith Smith - guitars (lead) (live) (2025-present)
- Joey Mancaruso – drums (live) (2025-present)
- Crystal Mancaruso – keyboards, backing vocals (live) (2025-present)
- Ronson Webster – keyboards
- Dave Holman – drums
- Dean Watkins – keyboards

Timeline

== Discography ==
- 1985: Believe EP (independent)
- 1986: Rock for the King (Star Song)
- 1988: Atomic Arena (Enigma Records)
- 1989: State of Control (Enigma Records)
- 1990: Hotter Than Hell Live! (live album; Restless)
- 1994: Rattle Your Cage (Rugged Records)
- 2007: Paid in Blood – The Very Best of Barren Cross (compilation; independent)
- 2013: Birth Pangs – Thirtieth Anniversary – Live from Elements of Rock, Switzerland

== See also ==
- List of Christian metal artists
