= Diamond Rexx =

American heavy metal/glam metal band

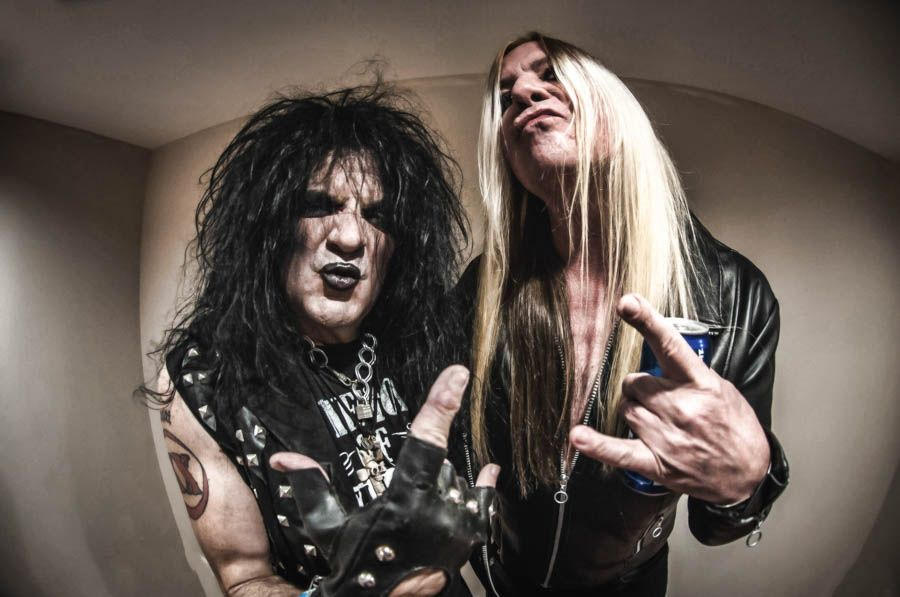

Background information
- Origin: Chicago, Illinois, US
- Genres: Heavy metal, glam metal
- Years active: 1985–present
- Labels: Island, Red Light, Crash Music Classics
- Members: Nasti Habits; S.S. Priest (a.k.a. S. St. Lust); Dave Andre; Johnny Cottone
- Past members: Johnny Angel; Chrissy Salem; Basil T. "Baz" Cooper; Billy Nychay; Tommy Hanus; Tommy Evans; Bill Schmidt; Tim Tully; Rob Pace; George Lorenzi
- Website: Official website

Diamond Rexx is an American heavy metal / glam metal band from Chicago, Illinois, formed in 1985 by singer Nasti Habits and guitarist Scott St. Lust (aka S. Scot Priest, also of D'Molls).

== History ==
Singer Nasti Habits created the original four-member lineup with guitarist S.S. Priest in 1985. Four months after their first live show the band signed a management deal with Mark Nawara who then got the band signed to Island records, and with the addition of bassist Andre and drummer Johnny Cottone they released their debut album Land of the Damned in 1986. In 1989, the band signed to the independent Red Light Records, where they released their second album Rated Rexx in 1990. and third release Golden Gates in 1991. The album boasted S.S. Priest on guitar but actually all guitars were performed by John Luckhaupt (aka: Johnny L. Angel) who had left the band just before the album's release. The band went on hiatus in the 1990s, but Habits formed a new line-up in 2001, now with S.S. Priest on guitar, Basil Cooper (Ex-Daisy Chain/Mind Bomb & Mary's Window) on bass and background vocals and Billy Nychay on drums, now influenced by alternative metal. This line-up recorded the Rexx Erected album, released on the Diamond label, as well as the "XX" ep recorded by the late Gary Loizzo, after which Baz Cooper left to be replaced by Tommy Hanus. The Evil was released in 2002 on Crash Music. In 2006 drummer Patrick McGreal and bassist Tommy Evans joined the band, and the following year, original drummer Johnny Cottone returned on drums. The band then went dormant and remained quiet over the next few years. In 2009 the original line-up of Habits/Andre/Priest/Cottone reunited for a twenty-year anniversary show.

Their last album, Psych Ward, was released by Pavement Entertainment in 2020 and features the band's original lineup.

On October 8, 2024, Scott Davis (aka SS Priest) died due to illness in Chicago. There is no word on the future of the band at this time.

== Band members ==
=== Current members ===
- Nasti Habits – lead vocals (1985–present)
- S.S. Priest – lead & rhythm guitars (1985–1995, 2000–2024)
- Basil T. "Baz" Cooper – bass (1992–1993, 2001–2002, 2023-present)
- Alex Tyler – Drums 2023-Present

=== Former members ===
- Dave Andre-Bass 1985
- Johnny Cottone-Drums 1985
- Johnny L. Angel – lead & rhythm guitars (1987–1990)
- Chrissy Salem – bass, backing vocals (1988–1992)
- Basil T. "Baz" Cooper – bass, backing vocals (1992–1993) (2001–2002) (2023–present)
- Tim Tully – drums, percussion (1987–1988)
- Billy Nychay – drums, percussion (1989–2003)
- Rob Pace – drums, percussion (2003)
- Bill Schmidt – drums, percussion (2004–2007)
- Tommy Evans – bass
- Patrick McGreal-drums
- Tommy Hanus – bass
- George Lunacy Lorenzi – Drums (1992–1993), (2017–2018) & (2021)

=== Crew and staff ===
- Danny Brasky – Stage and Sound
- Jim Haupert – Lighting and Promotions
- Billy Cafero
- Chris Johnson
- Billy Johnson
- Lynn Drake
- Andrew Plienas
- Mick Riley

== Discography ==
=== Albums ===
- Land of the Damned (1986)
- Rated Rexx (1990)
- Golden Gates (1991)
- Rexx Erected (2001)
- The Evil (2002).
- Psych Ward (2020)

=== EPs ===
- Golden Gates (1989)
- XX (2001)
