= Métamorphose (album) =

Studio album by Sortilège
- Released: 1984
- Genre: Heavy metal
- Length: 34:48; 52:47 (re-release)
- Labels: Madrigal, Steamhammer Records

Sortilège chronology
Sortilège (EP) (1983)	Métamorphose (1984)	Live Breaking Sound Festival (Bootleg) (1984)

Métamorphose is the first studio album by French heavy metal band Sortilège released in 1984. It was the first album released by Madrigal. In 1997 Madrigal re-released this album with English versions of Majesté, Légende, Civilisation Perdue, Cyclope De L'etang and Métamorphose as bonus tracks.

== Reception ==
Writing for Decibel, music journalist Greg Pratt said the album was an underrated classic in the genre: "Sortilège got absolutely everything right on this debut, the band tapping into much of what makes classic heavy metal so great, the triumphs unbelievably perfect, the glory taken to levels that few attain. The Cyclops was slayed, and Sortilège, even if they never hit this level of peak metal again, were the slayers, riding high long after the final notes on this album faded away into an unjust void."

== Track listing ==
No.	Title	Length
1.	"D'ailleurs"	2:37
2.	"Majesté"	4:51
3.	"Hymne à La Mort"	5:35
4.	"Légende"	2:49
5.	"Nuit Des Limbes"	2:25
6.	"Civilisation Perdue"	2:19
7.	"Délire D'un Fou"	5:31
8.	"Cyclope De L'etang"	3:57
9.	"Métamorphose"	4:44

=== Re-release bonus tracks ===
No.	Title	Length
10.	"Majesty"	4:50
11.	"Legend"	2:46
12.	"Lost Civilization"	2:19
13.	"Cyclops Of The Lake"	3:53
14.	"Metamorphosis"	4:11

== Personnel ==
- Christian Augustin – vocals
- Stéphane Dumont – lead guitar
- Didier Demajean – rhythm guitar
- Daniel Lapp – bass
- Bob Dumont – drums
