= Accuser (band) =

German thrash metal band

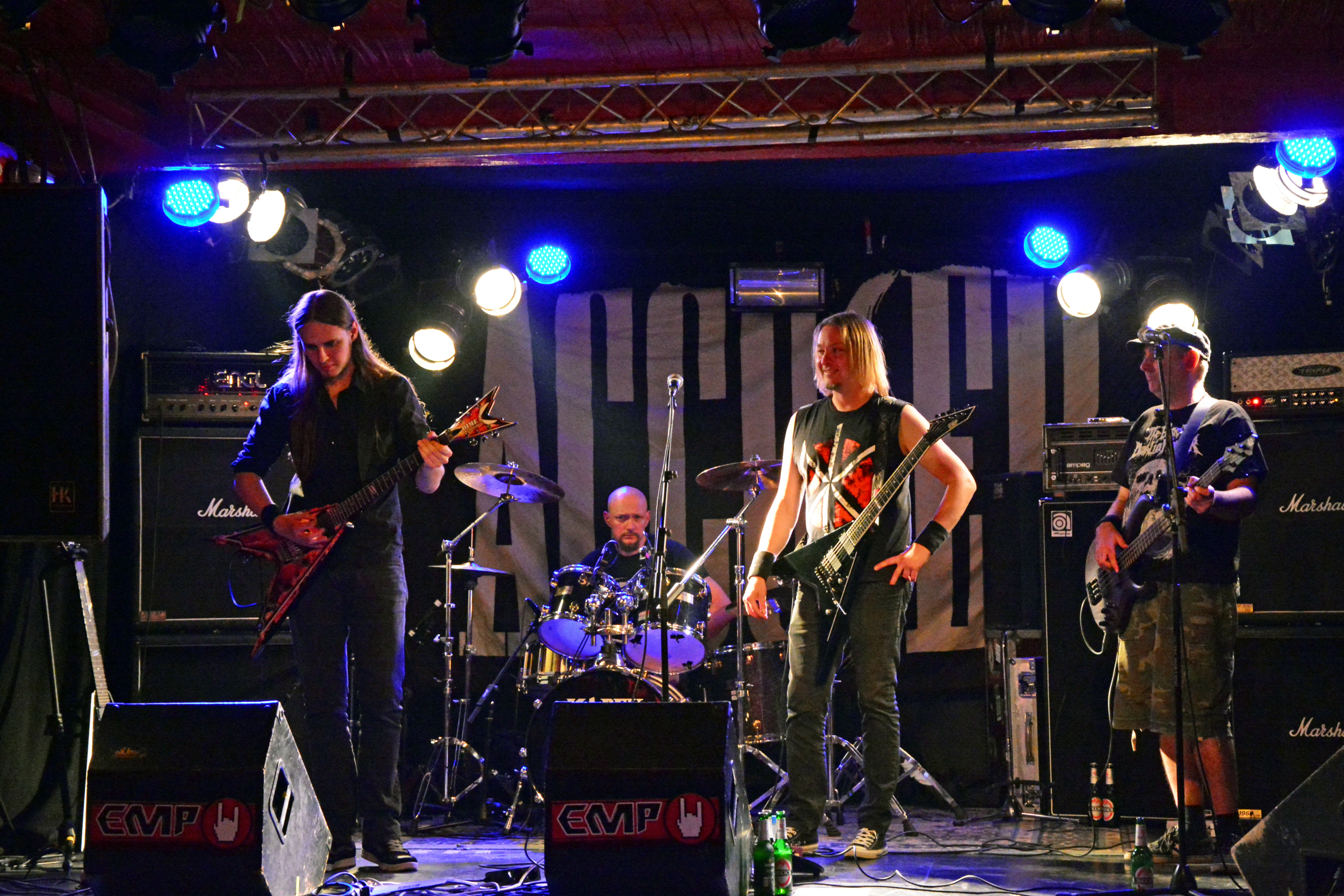
Accuser in 2013

Accuser, often stylised Accu§er, is a German thrash metal group from Kreuztal near Siegen. Founded in 1986, they notably released one album on Century Media Records and three on Metal Blade Records. In addition, their earlier albums have been re-released by No Remorse Records.

== Discography ==
- The Conviction (1987, Atom H)
- Experimental Errors EP (1988, Atom H)
- Who Dominates Who? (1989, Atom H)
- Double Talk (1991, Atom H)
- Repent (1992, Metal Machine Music/Rough Trade)
- Reflections (1994, C&C/Century Media Records)
- Taken by the Throat (1995, No Bull Records)
- Agitation (2010, Red Shift)
- Dependent Domination (2011, Red Shift)
- Diabolic (2013, Red Shift)
- The Forlorn Divide (2016, Metal Blade Records)
- The Mastery (2018, Metal Blade Records)
- Accuser (2020, Metal Blade Records)
- Rebirthless (2024, Metal Blade Records)
