= The Nightcomers (album) =

Studio album by Holocaust
- Released: April 1981
- Studio: Castle Sound Studios, Edinburgh, Scotland
- Genre: Heavy metal
- Length: 37:28
- Label: Phoenix Record and Filmworks
- Producer: Robert Bell

Holocaust chronology
The Nightcomers (1981)	Live (Hot Curry & Wine) (1983)

Professional ratings
Review scores
Source	Rating
AllMusic	3/5 stars
Collector's Guide to Heavy Metal	10/10

The Nightcomers is the debut studio album by Scottish heavy metal band Holocaust, released in 1981 at the apex of the new wave of British heavy metal phenomenon. The album was released by Holocaust's own label Phoenix Record And Filmworks and re-issued on CD by Edgy Records only in 2000. It was remastered and re-issued as a double CD by Castle/Sanctuary in 2003, including all the tracks from the "Smokin' Valves", "Heavy Metal Mania", and "Coming Through" singles and from the Live from the Raw Loud 'n' Live Tour EP.

== Track listing ==
Side one
No.	Title	Writer(s)	Length
1.	"Smokin' Valves"	Ed Dudley, John Mortimer	3:46
2.	"Death or Glory"	Mortimer	3:37
3.	"Come on Back"	Robin Begg, Dudley, Gary Lettice, Mortimer	3:06
4.	"Mavrock"	Lettice, Mortimer	5:22
5.	"It Don't Matter to Me"	Dudley, Mortimer	3:18

Side two
No.	Title	Writer(s)	Length
6.	"Cryin' Shame"	Begg, Dudley, Lettice, Mortimer	3:11
7.	"Heavy Metal Mania"	Mortimer	4:51
8.	"Push It Around"	Begg, Dudley, Lettice, Mortimer	4:01
9.	"The Nightcomers"	Dudley, Mortimer	6:22

2003 remastered edition CD2
No.	Title	Writer(s)	Length
10.	"Heavy Metal Mania" (Single version)	Mortimer	4:05
11.	"Love's Power"	Mortimer	3:10
12.	"Only as Young as You Feel"	Mortimer	4:05
13.	"Smokin Valves"	Dudley, Mortimer	3:43
14.	"Friend or Foe"	Dudley	2:55
15.	"Out My Book"	Lettice, Mortimer	3:42
16.	"Lovin' Feelin' Danger" (live)	Begg, Dudley, Lettice, Mortimer	4:40
17.	"No Nonsense" (live)	Mortimer	3:47
18.	"Death or Glory" (live)	Mortimer	3:26
19.	"Forcedown Breakdown" (live)	Begg, Dudley, Lettice, Mortimer	4:02
20.	"Coming Through"	Begg, Dudley, Lettice, Raymond Marciano	3:40
21.	"Don't Wanna Be (A Loser)"	Begg, Dudley, Lettice, Marciano	3:33
22.	"Good Thing"	Begg, Dudley, Lettice, Marciano	4:11

The song "Death or Glory" was covered by American death metal band Six Feet Under on their 1997 album Warpath, as well as by German power metal Band Gamma Ray in their 2013 EP Master of Confusion. Gamma Ray also covered the song "Heavy Metal Mania" in 1995 in their single "Rebellion in a Dreamland" (later included as bonus track on the album Land of the Free re-issued).

== Personnel ==
Band members

- Gary Lettice – vocals
- John Mortimer – guitars
- Ed Dudley – guitars
- Robin Begg – bass
- Paul Collins – drums

Additional musicians

- Raymond Marciano – drums on tracks 20–22

Production

- Robert Bell – producer
- Calum Malcom – engineer
