= Graceful Inheritance =

Studio album by Heir Apparent
- Released: January 1986
- Recorded: Late 1985 at Triad studios, Redmond, Washington
- Genre: Heavy metal
- Length: 46:16
- Labels: Black Dragon (original); Hellion (2000 reissue)
- Producer: Tom Hall

Heir Apparent chronology
Graceful Inheritance (1986)	One Small Voice (1989)

Professional ratings
Review scores
Source	Rating
Metal Forces	79/100

Graceful Inheritance is the debut album by an American metal band Heir Apparent, released in 1986 by French label Black Dragon Records. It was originally a vinyl-only release. Black Dragon re-released "Graceful Inheritance" on CD in October 1986, making it the first CD released by an independent label in Europe.

== Track listing ==
No.	Title	Writer(s)	Length
1.	"Entrance"	Terry Gorle	0:38
2.	"Another Candle"	Terry Gorle	3:56
3.	"The Servant"	Terry Gorle	3:25
4.	"Tear Down the Walls"	Cory Rivers, Derek Peace	4:34
5.	"Running From the Thunder"	Terry Gorle	2:59
6.	"The Cloak"	Cory Rivers, Terry Gorle	2:34
7.	"R.I.P. (live)"	Derek Peace, Terry Gorle	4:59
8.	"Hands of Destiny"	Derek Peace, Cory Rivers	3:27
9.	"Keeper of the Reign"	Terry Gorle	4:46
10.	"Dragon's Lair"	Terry Gorle	3:28
11.	"Masters of Invasion"	Terry Gorle, Derek Peace	5:07
12.	"Nightmare"	Terry Gorle	2:41
13.	"A.N.D.... Dogro Lived On"	Terry Gorle	3:42
Total length:			46:16

== Personnel ==
- Paul Davidson – vocals
- Terry Gorle – guitar and vocals
- Derek Peace – bass
- Raymond Black – drums

=== Other ===
- Eric Larnoy – cover
- Tom Hall – producing
