= Sortilège (band) =

French heavy metal band

Background information
- Origin: Paris, France
- Genre: Heavy metal
- Years active: 1981–1986, 2019–present
- Label: Steamhammer/SPV
- Members: Christian Augustin; Olivier Spitzer; Bruno Ramos; Sébastien Bonnet; Clément Rouxel
- Past members: Didier Demajean; Stéphane Dumont; Daniel Lapp; Bob Dumont; Nicklaus Bergen
- Website: sortilege.website

Sortilège is a French heavy metal band from Paris, regarded as a cult band of the French scene. Greg Pratt of Decibel considers their 1984 debut album Métamorphose an underrated classic in the genre. Blabbermouth stated that this release, as well as their self-titled debut EP that preceded it "are now known as some of the most important — if not the most important — heavy metal releases from France." Sortilège were among the favorite groups of late Death frontman Chuck Schuldiner. The group ceased to exist in 1986 but reformed in 2019.

== History ==
The band was formed in 1981 with Christian Augustin on vocals, Daniel Lapp on bass, Jean-Philippe (Bob) Dumont on drums and Stephane Dumont and Didier Demajean on guitars. Originally, the band's name was Bloodwave.

The following year, the quality of their repertoire and their concerts in France improved so they were hired as an opening act for Def Leppard on their tour in France. Since none of the French record labels wanted to offer them a recording contract, they signed for the Netherlands label Rave-On Records. A few months later, the band recorded an EP titled Sortilège which was successful. With this initial success, the band signed to the French record label, Madrigal. A few weeks later, the band went to Germany to record their first album Métamorphose. This was again a success, mainly in France and Germany. However, it also reached the United States, as Sortilège became Chuck Schuldiner’s favorite band and therefore a main influence for death metal pioneers Death (particularly the song “Amazone” included in that first EP).

With the success of Métamorphose, the band played in many international festivals and became popular in Germany, Netherlands, Switzerland, Belgium and France. Feeling that their French may harm global sales, the band decided to re-record their album Metamorphose in English. However, the English version of the record sold poorly everywhere except in Japan.

In 1986, Sortilège released their last album, Larmes de Héros. Like the previous album, it was recorded in Germany. At the same time they recorded an English version, which again sold badly. Tired of the lack of public support, and difficulties encountered in relation to record companies, Sortilège decided to split up in 1986.

No Remorse Records reissued the band's debut EP and debut full-length album in 2017. The EP came with four bonus tracks, which originally appeared on the band's 1982 demo tape. Métamorphose was released as a double CD, which included the album's original mix as well as the final version.

The band reunited in 2019, without guitarist Stéphane Dumont, for a festival appearance in Germany. In April 2021, Sortilège announced their return with a new band lineup, helmed by original vocalist Christian Augustin, on their Instagram page. Later that year, the band released Phoenix, an album consisting of primarily re-recorded tracks from past albums, as well as two new songs. As of June 2021, Augustin is currently the only member remaining from the band's original lineup.

In January 2023, the band announced their new album, Apocalypso, would be released on 3 March. It is the band's first album of original material in 37 years.

== Musical style ==
The band's music is highly melodic and has drawn comparisons to Judas Priest. AllMusic said the band's music "specialized in a persistent metallic boogie." The band's lyrical themes include swords, magic, witchcraft, and monsters. Like most French heavy metal bands of their era, the lyrics were sung in the French language, though English language versions were recorded for Métamorphose and Larmes de Héros.

== Other appearances ==
The song "Le Cyclope De l'Etang", released in 1984 on the album Métamorphose is on the compilation album Metal Warriors (released by Ebony Records).

Christian Augustin appeared as a guest on the album by Furious Zoo. Stephane Dumont works as a sound engineer in the United States. Didier Demajean is director of a computer company, and Jean-Philippe Dumont is noticeable for his attempt to reform Sortilège in the early 2000s.

== Members ==
Current members

- Christian Augustin known as "Zouille" – vocals (1981–1986, 2019–present)
- Olivier Spitzer – guitar (2021–present)
- Bruno Ramos – guitar (2021–present)
- Sébastien Bonnet – bass (2021–present)
- Clément Rouxel – drums (2021–present)

Former members

- Nicklaus Bergen – lead guitar
- Stéphane Dumont known as "L'Anguille" – lead guitar
- Didier Demajean known as "Dem" – rhythm guitar
- Daniel Lapp known as "Lapin" – bass
- Jean-Philippe Dumont known as "Bob Snake" – drums

== Discography ==
- 1983: Sortilège(EP)
- 1984: Métamorphose
- 1984: Live Breaking Sound Festival (bootleg)
- 1986: Larmes de Héros
- 2021: Phoenix(compil)
- 2023: Apocalypso
- 2023: Coram Populo (live album)
- 2025: Le Poids de l’Âme
