= White Sister (band) =

American rock band

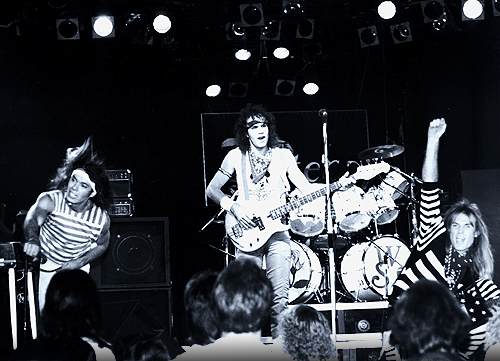
- White Sister performing in 1982

Background information
- Origin: Burbank, California, U.S.
- Genres: Hard rock, heavy metal
- Years active: 1980–1989
- Labels: EMI, FM Revolver
- Spinoffs: Tattoo Rodeo
- Past members: Dennis Churchill-Dries; Rick Chadock; Gary Brandon; Gus Moratinos; Richard Wright

White Sister was an American hard rock and AOR band formed in 1980. Their song "Save Me Tonight" appeared on the soundtrack album for the 1985 Columbia Pictures film, Fright Night. Their song "April" can be heard in the 1986 Metro-Goldwyn Mayer film, Killer Party. The band also performs in the movie. The band recorded the song "Touch the Sky" which can be heard in the 1986 film Thrashin' starring Josh Brolin. Their song "Dancin' on Midnight" appeared on the soundtrack album for the 1989 Magnum Pictures film Halloween 5: The Revenge of Michael Myers. Their song "Fashion by Passion" appeared on the soundtrack album for Touchstone Pictures film Stella (1990) starring Bette Midler.

== History ==
White Sister was formed in Burbank, California, by lead vocalist/bassist Dennis Churchill-Dries, guitarist Rick Chadock, lead vocalist/keyboardist Gary Brandon and drummer Gus Moratinos. The group played their first gig at The Ice House in Pasadena, California and worked their way up; eventually headlining shows at The Troubadour, West Hollywood, Whisky a Go Go, Roxy Theatre, and other prominent clubs in Hollywood, California. Original drummer Gus Moratinos left amicably in 1981 citing musical differences, and was replaced by Richard Wright to round out the second incarnation of the band.

White Sister met Gregg Giuffria from the band Angel at a gas station one evening, and wound up working with him to assist with song arrangement, leading Giuffria to produce White Sister demos and eventually, their debut album released in 1984, on EMI America Records.

Shortly after the release of the album, the band approached EMI to secure tour support money. They believed that their powerful live show would aid greatly in boosting sales, but unfortunately, the label was not willing to fund a tour for the band. Additional friction was caused when the label requested that the band change its name, since another national band also had the word "sister" in their name (Twisted Sister). After a band vote, the members decided they would not change their name, citing the fact that more than one other national band had the word "white" in their name, and those bands were being marketed successfully by their labels. EMI relented and the self-titled album was not re-packaged.

Brandon parted ways with the band before they released their second album entitled Fashion by Passion on the FM Revolver label. Brandon went on to do multiple TV appearances, and tour, with British pop sensation John Parr, while the remaining band members went on the record Fashion By Passion which contained the songs "April" and "Save Me Tonight"; both songs co-written with Brandon before his departure. The album was produced by Joel Goldsmith and released on FM Revolver Records. The band patched the lineup and eventually traveled overseas to the U.K. themselves, where their reception was considerably warmer than in the United States. They toured with the band FM and established a cult following in the process.

== Subsequent activities ==
Churchill-Dries, Chadock and Wright would eventually let go of White Sister and go on to form another group with keyboardist Michael Lord, Tattoo Rodeo, which was signed to Atlantic Records. They released the album Rode Hard Put Away Wet in 1991, scoring radio hits with the song "Been Your Fool" and "Let Me Be the One". Tattoo Rodeo went on tour in support of the album, opening for Bad Company and Damn Yankees. A second album entitled Skin was released in 1995 and produced by Arthur Payson.

After suffering health complications, Richard Wright died on June 14, 2006, at the age of 44.

=== Reunion ===
In 2008, Brandon rejoined Churchill Dries and Chadock, as the 3 original members were invited to the UK to play the Firefest rock festival. A full-length concert DVD of their 2008 Nottingham performance was filmed and released in 2009. Jason Montgomery quite expertly covered the drum duties for these shows. The DVDs sold out in short order. The band was invited back by the festival organizers in 2009 for an encore performance, but this, possibly their final White Sister show, was not filmed professionally.

== Recent events ==
On October 15, 2012, Rick Chadock lost his quiet battle with cancer.

Churchill Dries completed his first solo album (entitled "I"), released May 15, 2015, to positive reviews. He is currently in production on a new project with Stan Cotey form the band Giraffe. A release is expected in early 2019.

Brandon is currently performing live with his solo band, supporting the release of his archived heavy funk-rock album Radioux City (1989–91), which was released in May 2017 by AOR Blvd Records (U.K.). Original White Sister drummer, Gus Moratinos, joined Gary for a couple live shows in 2015.

== Band members ==
Former members

- Dennis Churchill-Dries – lead vocals/bass guitar (1980–2009)
- Rick Chadock – lead guitar (1980–2009)
- Gary Brandon – lead vocals/keyboards (1980–1985, 2008–2009)
- Gus Moratinos – drums (1980–1981)
- Richard Wright – drums (1981–1989)

== Discography ==
=== Studio albums ===
- White Sister (1984)
- Fashion by Passion (1986)

=== Soundtrack appearances ===
Title	Release	Soundtrack album
"Save Me Tonight"	1985	Fright Night
"April"	1986	Killer Party
"Touch the Sky"	1986	Thrashin'
"Dancin' on Midnight"	1989	Halloween 5: The Revenge of Michael Myers
"Fashion by Passion"	1990	Stella
