= Warning (French band) =

French hard rock band

Warning was a French hard-rock band active from 1980 until 1985. They released three albums sung in French language, their second being produced by Dieter Dierks.

== Discography ==
- Warning I, Polydor 1981, CD re-issue by Axe Killer, gold certification in France
- Warning II, Polydor 1982, CD re-issue by Axe Killer, gold certification in France
- Metamorphose, Columbia 1984

== Musicians ==
- Raphael Garrido : vocals on Warning I and Warning II
- Francis Petit : vocals on Metamorphose
- Christophe Aubert : guitars, died in a car crash in 1994
- Didier Bernoussi : guitars on Warning I and Warning II, died in 2011
- Michel Aymé : bass on Warning II and Metamorphose
- Gerald Manceau : drums on Warning II and Metamorphose
