= Savage Grace (metal band) =

American heavy metal band

- Origin: Los Angeles, California, U.S.
- Genres: Power metal, speed metal, heavy metal
- Years active: 1981–1992, 2009–2010, 2020–present
- Labels: Metal Blade, Semaphore, Limb Music, Savage Grace Metal
- Members: Sebastian Hauser; Christian Logue; Eric Antonello; Cristian Blade; Marcus Dotta; Hugo Terva
- Past members: (See:full listing)
- Website: www.savagegracemetal.com

Savage Grace is an American power and speed metal band formed in Los Angeles in 1981 by Chris Logue and Brian East (nicknamed "The Beast", from the Pacific Northwest band AlleyBrat), initially active between 1981 and 1993. They reformed in 2009, and subsequently released an EP entitled The Lost Grace. In 2010, they performed at the Up the Hammers, Bang Your Head!!! and Keep It True festivals.

== Biography ==
Their original name was Marquis de Sade, named after the French aristocrat of the same name. They would later change their name to Savage Grace after the 1970s rock band led by Ron Koss that were on Warner/Reprise Records. Their first demos were recorded with Ozzy Osbourne's guitarist Randy Rhoads' brother Kelle on vocals. Randy had suggested the name Savage Grace to Kelle.

Metal Blade would select the song "Scepters of Deceit" from a three song demo for their 1982 Metal Massacre II compilation, with Dwight Cliff taking over vocals from Rhoads.

The band's 1983 debut release, The Dominatress EP, was recorded with Logue on guitar, Brian "Beast" East on bass, Dan Finch on drums, John Birk on vocals and new guitarist Kenny Powell on guitar (who would soon leave to form his own band, Omen).

The band's first full-length album, Master of Disguise, followed in 1985 and introduced yet another new vocalist, Mike Smith. The album's controversial cover depicts a police officer with red demon-like eyes keeping a topless girl cleave gagged and handcuffed to his motorcycle. The album was also recorded with only one guitar player, Chris Logue handled all guitar duties. During its release Grace were joined for a short period by Kurt Phillips of Canadian band Witchkiller and then Mark "Chase" Marshall. Later Mike Smith was fired and, after touring Europe, Dan Finch left the band.

The second album, 1986's After the fall from Grace, was recorded by Chris Logue on guitars and lead vocals, Brian East on bass, Mark "Chase" Marshall on guitar and Mark Marcum on drums. After another tour of Europe, Beast left the band.

The group's final output, the Ride into The Night EP, included a cover of the Deep Purple classic "Burn". It also featured new bass player Derek Peace, a member of Heir Apparent.

The band was also featured on the Speed Metal Hell – Vol. 1 compilation album in 1985, with the songs "Master of Disguise" and "Fear my Way". Another song, "Mainline Lover", appeared on the 1993 compilation American Metal – Heavy 'N' Dirty.

In 2010, Chris Logue reformed the band with musicians of the German band Roxxcalibur, and played a European tour in April and May in addition to festivals such as Keep It True and Bang Your Head!!!. The band split up in October 2010. The whole Savage Grace back catalog was re-released by the German label Limb Music and several live songs were set to be included on the Keep It True Festival 2010 DVD. A new album was planned after the tour, but Logue mysteriously disappeared during the songwriting sessions. The new line-up decided to bring in a new vocalist and released the already finished songs in late 2013 under the moniker of Masters Of Disguise.

On February 8, 2023, it was announced the band would release their third album, Sign of the Cross, on May 5. It was the band's first album in 37 years. The album sold very well and received very strong reviews.

In April 2024, Savage Grace embarked on their fourth tour of Europe, featuring a line-up comprising singer Tasos Lazaris, drummer Hugo Terva, guitarists Dan Baune and Eric Antonello, alongside Christian Logue on guitar. The band played eighteen shows in Europe between April and December 2024, with singer Jaime Killhead temporarily replacing Tasos Lazaris for the final two dates of the tour.

In December 2025, Savage Grace played two sold-out shows in Europe. Notably, their performance at the "Blast from the Past" festival in Kuurne, Belgium, was recorded for the band's first-ever live DVD, titled Savage Grace Live in Europe. The highly anticipated live release—which prominently features and highlights the energetic presence of musicians **Eric Antonello**, **Hugo Terva**, **Sebastian Hauser**, and **Christian Blade**—is set for release on August 27, 2026, under the band's own Savage Grace Metal label.

The band will release their fourth studio album, titled Underworld, in October 2026. The recording line-up for this release consists of Sebastian Hauser on vocals, Cristian Blade on bass, Christian Logue on guitars, and Marcus Dotta on drums.

== Members ==
Current members

- Christian Logue — guitar (1981–1992, 2020–present), vocals (1985–1992, 2009–2010)
- Eric Antonello — guitar (2024–present)
- Sebastian Hauser — vocals (2026–present)
- Cristian Blade — bass (2024–present)
- Marcus Dotta — drums (2022–2023, 2026–present)
- Hugo Terva — drums (2024–present)

Former members

- Brian "Beast" East — bass (1981–1986)
- Kelle Rhoads — vocals (1981–1982)
- Steve Widdick — drums (1981)
- Dan Finch III — drums (1981–1985)
- Dwight Cliff — vocals (1982–1983)
- Kenny Powell — guitar (1983–1984)
- John Birk — vocals (1983–1984)
- Mike Smith — vocals (1984–1985)
- Kurt Phillips — guitar (1984)
- Mark Marshall — guitar (1984–1989)
- Marc Marcum — drums (1986–1988)
- Derek Peace — bass (1986–1987)
- Neal Delaforce — bass (1987–1988)
- Marshall Lee Dickerson — drums (1988–1992)
- Mike Breanning — bass (1989–1992)
- Keith Alexander — guitar (1991; died 2005)
- Gene Chapman — guitar (1991–1992)
- Eric "Kalli" Coldsmith — guitar (2009–2010)
- Roger Dequis — guitar (2009–2010)
- Mario Lang — bass (2009–2010)
- Andreas "Neudi" Neuderth — drums (2009–2010)
- Kiko Shred — guitar (2020–2022)
- David Sandoval — guitar (2022–2024)
- Gabriel Colón — vocals (2022–2023)
- Fabio Carito — bass (2022–2023)
- Michael Draveck — vocals (2023–2024)
- Alfredo Hernández — bass (2023–2024)
- Tasos Lazaris — vocals (2024)
- Dan Baune — guitar (2024)
- Jaime Killhead — vocals (2024)

== Discography ==
=== Albums ===
- Master of Disguise (1985)
- After the Fall from Grace (1986)
- Sign of the Cross (2023)
- Underworld (2026)

=== Demos/EPs ===
- 1982 Demo (1982)
- Demo (1982)
- The Dominatress (EP) (1983)
- 1984 Demo (1984)
- Ride into the Night (EP) (1987)

=== Live albums/DVDs ===
- Savage Grace Live in Europe (DVD) (2026)

=== Compilations ===
- Metal Massacre II (1982)
- Speed Metal Hell – Vol. 1 (1985)
- American Metal – Heavy 'n' dirty (1993)
