= Heir Apparent (band) =

American heavy metal band

- Origin: Seattle, Washington, U.S.
- Genres: Heavy metal, power metal, progressive metal
- Years active: 1983–1989, 2000–2019
- Labels: NW Metalworx, VIC, No Remorse, Hellion, Metal Blade, Capitol, Black Dragon
- Website: www.heirapparent.com

Heir Apparent is an American heavy metal/progressive metal band from Seattle, formed in 1983.

== History ==
Heir Apparent was formed in 1983 in Seattle by guitarist Terry Gorle. Vocalist Paul Davidson, bassist Derek Peace, and drummer Jim Kovach joined Gorle to form Heir Apparent's original lineup. In July 1984, the band entered Triad Studios in Redmond, WA, to record a five-song demo that received local airplay on KISW and KZOK. A month after recording their first demo in 1984, Jim Kovach was replaced by Ray Schwartz (using the name Raymond Black). This lineup recorded Heir Apparent's debut studio album, Graceful Inheritance. The album was released for the European market in January 1986 by the independent French label Black Dragon Records. Supported by the UK's Metal Hammer magazine, Heir Apparent toured France, the Netherlands, and Germany in May and June 1986, originally as a support act but ending as the headliner on a tour with Savage Grace. Germany's Rock Hard gave the album a rating of 49/50 points in the February 1986 issue. Encouraged by strong sales, Black Dragon re-released the album in October 1986, this time on CD, making it one of the first CDs released by an independent label in Europe. Graceful Inheritance was never released in the US during the 1980s, the group's home country. Graceful Inheritance was ranked No. 188 in the German hardcover book, Best of Rock and Metal – Top 500 Albums of All Time, published in 2005.

Following the departure of lead vocalist Paul Davidson in 1987, Steve Benito took over singing duties. Additionally, Heir Apparent’s lineup became a quintet with the addition of keyboardist Mike Jackson. The new lineup recorded Heir Apparent’s second studio album, One Small Voice, which marked a musical shift toward the more technical sound of progressive metal, compared to the traditional heavy and power metal style of the previous release. In the summer of 1988, Heir Apparent had their first large arena performance, serving as an opening act for David Lee Roth at the Seattle Center Coliseum. Soon after, the band signed a seven-album contract in 1988 through a joint venture with Capitol Records/Metal Blade, but suddenly dissolved even before the official release of One Small Voice in June 1989. Without concert support, and with the emergence of grunge in the Seattle area, the second album did not reach the underground success and critical acclaim of the debut until many years later, prompting the Greek label Arkeyn Steel Records to release a digitally remastered limited edition of One Small Voice with bonus tracks and a live DVD from a 1988 concert video of this lineup in 2010.

The German label Hellion Records released the Triad demo compilation album in late 1999, along with a reissue of the band’s first album, Graceful Inheritance. The band remained inactive until 2000, when guitarist Terry Gorle was invited to perform at the Wacken Open Air festival. Gorle reunited with the original rhythm section of Ray Schwartz and Derek Peace, with the addition of Michael James Flatters on vocals. Following that comeback performance, Terry Gorle led several different lineups in concerts between 2002 and 2004. The 2004 lineup—Terry Gorle (guitar), Bobby Ferkovich (bass), Op Sakiya (keyboards), Jeff McCormack (drums), and Peter Orullian (vocals)—reunited to perform in Europe in November 2006, headlining Germany's Keep It True festival and playing two additional shows in Greece.

In January 2012, Heir Apparent’s original musicians (Gorle, Schwartz, and Peace) performed with Jeff Carrell on vocals at the Metal Assault II Festival in Germany, with additional concerts in Athens and Thessaloniki, Greece, in celebration of the 25th anniversary of Graceful Inheritance.

In October 2015, Heir Apparent performed their first concert in Italy at the Play It Loud Festival with vocalist Will Shaw and keyboardist Op Sakiya joining Gorle, Peace, and Schwartz. During 2016, Heir Apparent co-headlined festival concerts in Greece at Up the Hammers and in Germany at Keep It True. 2016 also brought limited edition vinyl releases of material from the 1983 Nemesis demo, the 1984 Inception Day demo, the 1987–88 Triad demos, and Graceful Inheritance.

Heir Apparent's third album, The View from Below, was released worldwide in October 2018 on No Remorse Records with Will Shaw on vocals, Terry Gorle on guitar, Derek Peace on bass, Ray Schwartz on drums, and Op Sakiya on keyboards. The album was highly rated by numerous magazines and journalists. In 2019, Heir Apparent performed at the Rock Hard Festival, as well as serving as the Saturday headliner at Headbangers Open Air Festival in Germany. Each festival appearance was followed by club shows in the Netherlands.

In April 2025, a new Heir Apparent lineup performed a series of concerts in homage to the 40th anniversary of the recording of "Graceful Inheritance" featuring vocalist Harry Conklin (Jag Panzer, Titan Force) with a special limited appearance by original vocalist Paul Davidson. Joining guitarist Terry Gorle was bassist Duane Bakke (previously bassist in Heir Apparent from late 1986 to early 1987), and drummer AJ Bernstein. The 2025 Heir Apparent lineup performed shows in Portland & Seattle before their appearance co-headlining the Keep It True XXV Festival in Germany, followed by two shows in Athens Greece, the Horn's Up Festival in Trikala, and the Eightball in Thessaloniki. Success of these events has inspired writing a new album moving forward to 2026 and beyond.

== Musical influences ==
On their official Myspace page, the band stated Black Sabbath, Dio, Judas Priest, Iron Maiden, Pink Floyd, Rainbow, and Deep Purple as their main musical influences. They were often compared to contemporaries Queensrÿche.

== Band members ==
=== 2025 lineup ===
- Harry Conklin – vocals
- Terry Gorle – guitars
- Duane Bakke – bass
- AJ Bernstein – drums

=== Former members ===
Vocals

- Will Shaw (2015-2019)
- Paul Davidson (1983–1986) (2025)
- Steve Benito (1987–1989)
- Michael James Flatters (2000)
- Bryan Hagan (2003)
- Peter Orullian (2004–2006)
- Mike Blair (2003)
- Jeff Carrell (2012 tour)
- Mike Gorham (2013)

Bass

- Derek Peace (1983–1989) (2000) (2012) (2015-2019)
- Duane Bakke (1986) (current)
- Randy Nelson (1987)
- Bobby Ferkovich (2004–2006)

Drums

- Jim Kovach (1983–1984)
- Ray Schwartz (1984–1989) (2000) (2012) (2015-2019)
- Jeffrey McCormack (2004–2006)
- Clint Clark (2003–2004)
- AJ Bernstein (2024-2025)

Keyboards

- Nathan McCoy (1985)
- Mike Jackson (1987–1989)
- Op Sakiya (2004–2006)

== Discography ==
=== Studio albums ===
- Graceful Inheritance (1986), Black Dragon
- One Small Voice (1989), Capitol/Metal Blade
- The View From Below (2018), No Remorse

=== Reissues ===
- Graceful Inheritance (1999 – CD), Hellion
- Triad (1999 – CD), Hellion
- One Small Voice (2010 – CD/DVD), Arkeyn Steel
- Graceful Inheritance (2012 – CD/DVD), Death Rider
- Graceful Inheritance (2015 – vinyl), NW Metalworx
- One Small Voice (2021 – CD, vinyl), NW Metalworx
- Foundations 1 & 2 (2021 – CD), VIC Records

=== Compilation albums ===
- One Small Voice (digital remaster with bonus tracks), Riviera DVD (2010), Arkeyn Steel
- Graceful Inheritance (digital remaster with bonus tracks and 1984 demo), LiveTime DVD (2012), Death Rider
- Foundations (2016), Floga Records
