= Master of Disguise (Savage Grace album) =

Studio album by Savage Grace
- Released: March 14, 1985
- Recorded: August–October 1984
- Studio: Sutton Place, Los Angeles
- Genre: Power metal, speed metal
- Length: 35:32
- Label: Important Records
- Producer: Savage Grace, James Sutton, Rick Knutson

Savage Grace chronology
Master of Disguise (1985)	After the Fall from Grace (1986)

Alternative cover

Professional ratings
Review scores
Source	Rating
Kerrang!	3/5 stars
Metal Forces	(9/10)

Master of Disguise is the first album by American speed metal band Savage Grace, released in 1985.

== Track listing ==
All songs by Christian Logue except "Lions Roar" and "Sons of Iniquity" by Brian East

Side one

1. "Lions Roar" – 1:02
2. "Bound to Be Free" – 4:26
3. "Fear My Way" – 4:22
4. "Sins of the Damned" – 4:19
5. "Into the Fire" – 3:29

Side two

1. "Master of Disguise" – 4:03
2. "Betrayer" – 4:57
3. "Sons of Iniquity" – 4:40
4. "No One Left to Blame" – 4:14

== Personnel ==
- Mike Smith – vocals
- Christian Logue – guitars
- Brian East – bass
- Dan Finch – drums
