= Stormwitch =

German heavy metal band

- Origin: Heidenheim, Baden Württemberg, Germany
- Genres: Heavy metal, power metal
- Years active: 1981–1994, 2002–2004, 2010–present
- Labels: GAMA, Scratch, Battle Cry, Nuclear Blast
- Members: Andy Mück (Andy Aldrian), Vocals; Pietro Raneri, Bass; Jonathan Kröner, Guitar; Martin Heusinger, Guitar; Alex Sauer, Drums
- Past members: Harald Spengler(Lee Tarot), Guitar; Stefan Kaufmann (Steve Merchant), Guitar; Peter Langer (Pete Lancer), Drums; Jürgen Wannenwetsch, Bass till 1983; Ronny Gleisberg, Bass
- Website: stormwitch.de

Stormwitch is a German heavy metal band from Heidenheim, formed in 1981. They have been called "The Masters of Black Romantic" by their fans. The band's song lyrics often focused on fantasy, occult or historical themes, along with their contemporaries and countrymen Helloween. Over time, they have changed their sound from a Judas Priest-esque style of heavy metal to a more keyboard-based form of power metal.

== History ==
Stormwitch was founded in the early 1980s by childhood friends Harald Spengler (Lee Tarot), Stefan Kauffmann (Steve Merchant), and Andy Mück, writing their first songs while they searched for the final pieces of the band to play live shows, including clubs and youth centers. The first lineup was completed by Peter Langer (Pete Lancer) and Jürgen Wannenwetsch.

Their first album, Walpurgis Night, in 1984, was recorded using as little post-production as possible to remain true to the sound they were trying to achieve. They did not use multi-track recording, instead recording the album straight through. Approximately a year later, they recorded the album Tales of Terror, of which the master tapes were supposed to be destroyed, only recently being re-recorded using original LP albums. Their third album, Stronger Than Heaven, was released in 1986, followed by The Beauty and the Beast in 1987. In 1989, they released Eye of the Storm and Live in Budapest.

The band toured much of Europe during the Cold War, including Eastern European countries such as Hungary, where they were waylaid by officials and nearly missed the first gig of that particular tour. Shortly after, Harald Spengler left the band to concentrate on managing. In 1992, Stefan Kauffmann and Wolfgang Schludi (who replaced Harald Spengler) also left the band before the recordings for War of the Wizards could start. The recording lineup for War of the Wizards consisted of Andy Mück (vocals), Damir Uzunovic (guitar), Joe Gassmann (guitar), Martin Albrecht (bass), and Peter Langer (drums). After the release, Joe Gassmann had to leave the band. As a four-piece, they recorded Shogun in 1994.

After some changes in lineup once again and an eventual breakup in 1996, Andy Mück, the only member from the original lineup, and Martin Winkler, wrote the song "Dance with the Witches" in 2002, and with a new lineup and the help of Nuclear Blast Records, Stormwitch regrouped once more and took to the stage. Among others, they performed at Wacken Open Air in August 2002.

This new lineup also released the album Witchcraft in 2004 but split up shortly after. Again Andy Mück was the original member. He regrouped with first bass player Jürgen Wannenwetsch in 2005. In 2010, the lineup was completed once again with Ralf Spitznagel (guitar), Marc Scheunert (guitar), and Harry Reischmann (drums). Reischmann's departure was announced in January 2011, with Stefan Köllner being brought in to replace him on drums. On 11 April 2013, original guitarist Lee Tarot died of a stroke at the age of 50. In April 2013, guitarist Marc Scheunert left the band due to problems caused by the age gap between himself and the other members of the band.

== Members ==
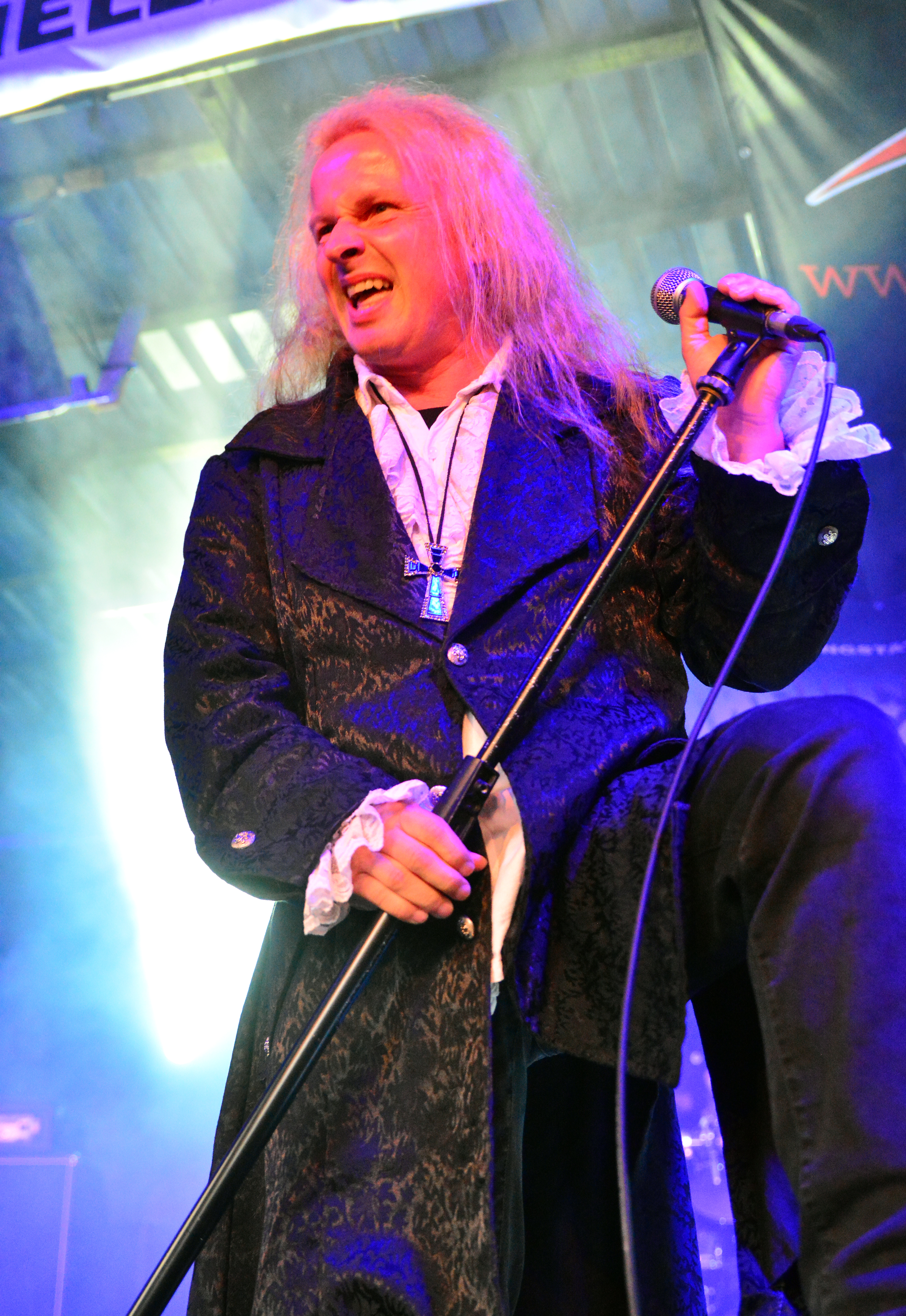
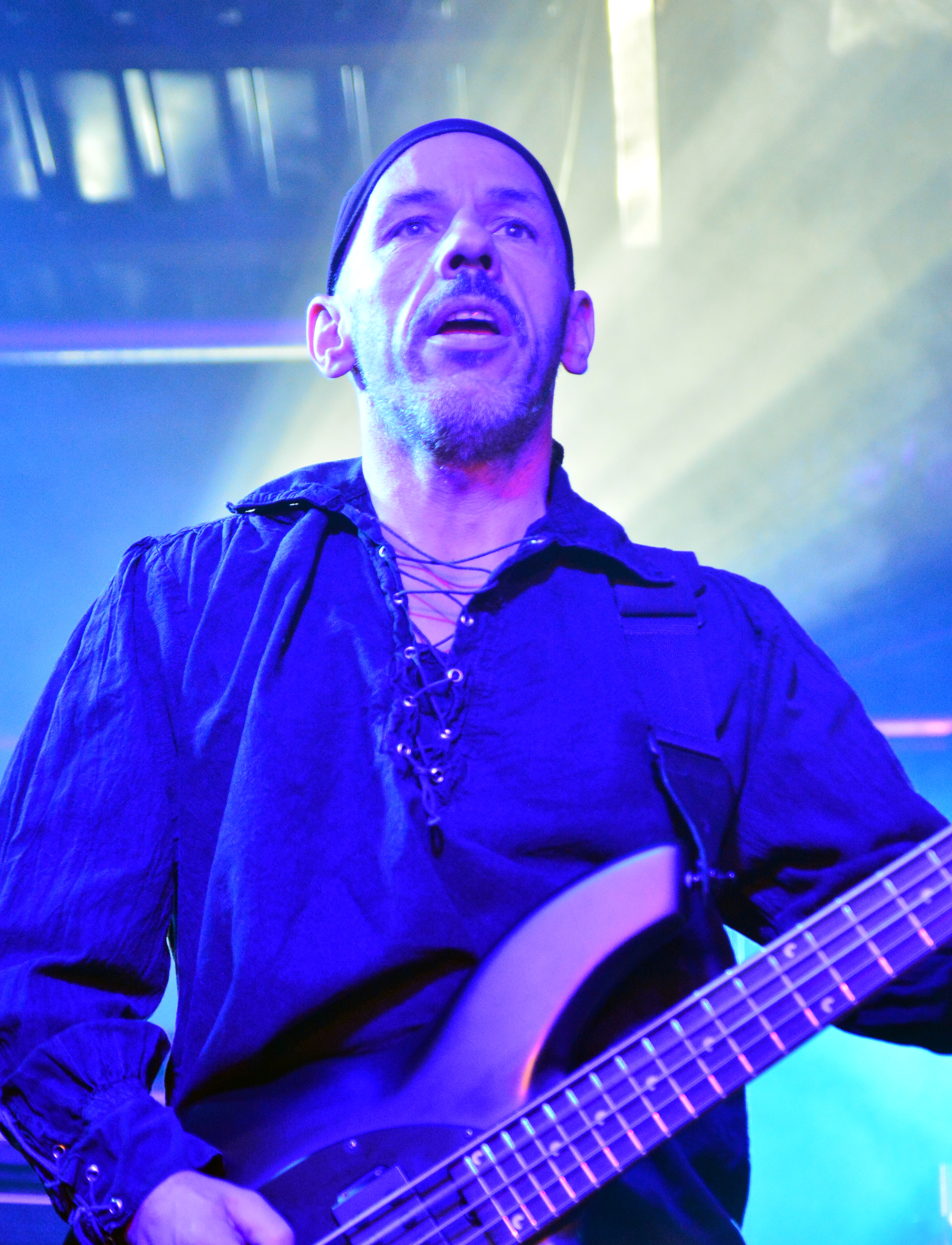
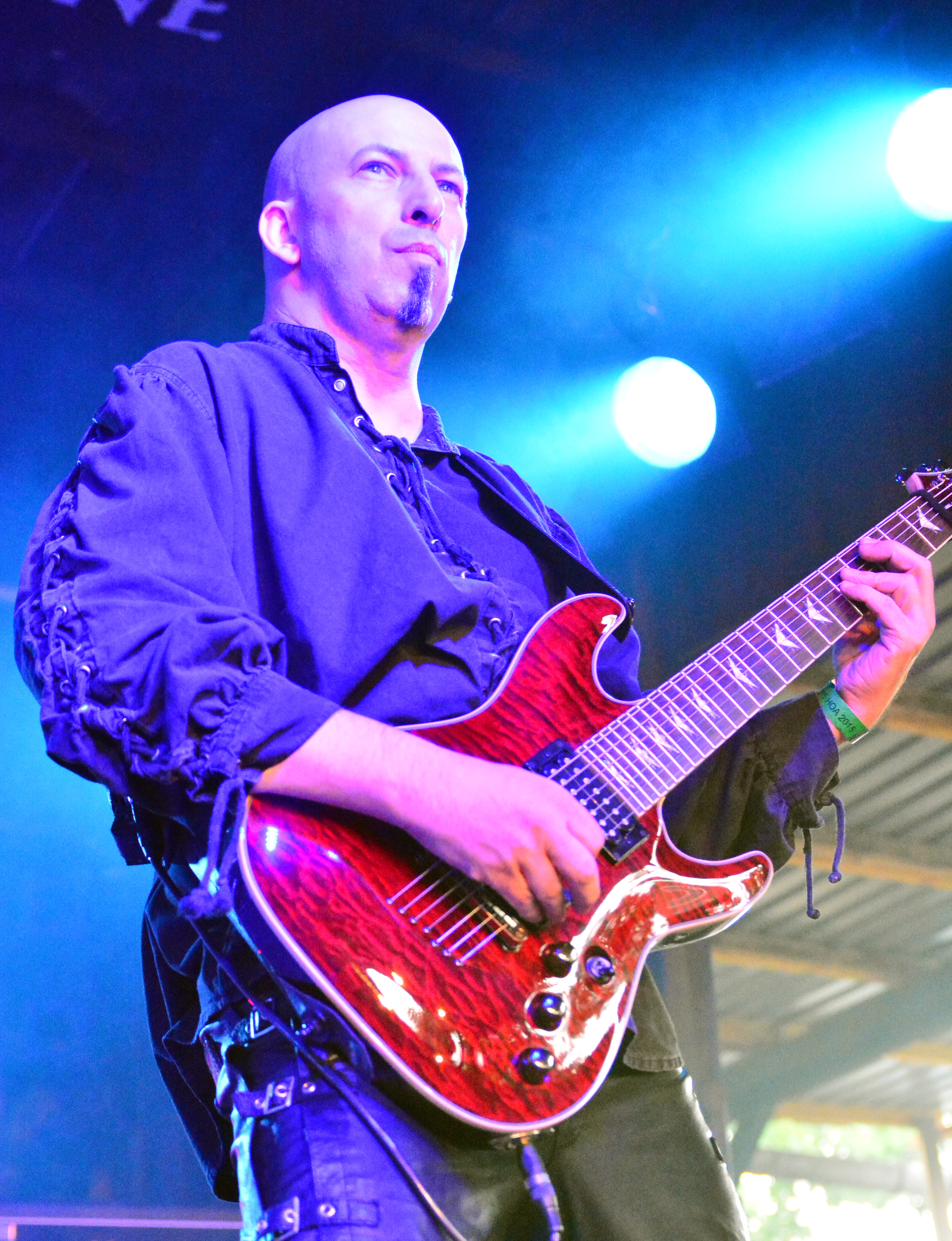
Stormwitch at Headbangers Open Air 2015

=== Current ===
- Andy Mück – vocals (1981–1994, 2002–2004, 2010–present)
- Pietro Raneri – bass (2019–present)
- Alex Sauer – drums (2019–present)
- Jonathan "Johnny" Kröner – guitar (2019–present)
- Martin Heusinger – guitar (2023–present)

=== Former ===
Guitar

- Steve Merchant (1981–1989)
- Lee Tarot (1981–1989; died 2013)
- Damir Uzunovic (1990–1994)
- Joe Gassmann (1990–1992)
- Robert Balci (1992–1994)
- Martin Winkler (2002–2004; died 2019)
- Fabian Schwarz (2002–2004)
- Marc Scheunert (2010–2013)
- Volker Schmietow (2013–2019)
- Tobias Kipp (2016–2019)
- Nick Berger (2019–2020)

Bass

- Ronny Pearson (1983–1987)
- Andy Hunter (1987–1989)
- Martin Albrecht (1990–1994)
- Dominik Schwarz (2002–2004)
- Jürgen Wannenwetsch (1981–1983, 2010–2019)

Drums

- Peter Lancer (1981–1994, 2012–2014)
- Michael Blechinger (2004–2005)
- Harry Reischmann (2010–2011)
- Micha Kasper (2014–2015)
- Marc Oppold (2002–2004, 2016–2019)

== Discography ==
- Walpurgis Night (1984)
- Tales of Terror (1985)
- Stronger Than Heaven (1986)
- The Beauty and the Beast (1988)
- Live in Budapest (1989)
- Eye of the Storm (1989)
- War of the Wizards (1992)
- Shogun (1994)
- Dance with the Witches (2002)
- Witchcraft (2004)
- Season of the Witch (2015)
- Bound to the Witch (2018)
