= Sacred Rite (band) =

American heavy metal band

- Also known as: Sabre (1980–1983); Beauty Knows Pain (1989–1992); Tragic Nancy (1992–1994)
- Origin: Honolulu, Hawaii, U.S.
- Genres: Heavy metal; power metal
- Years active: 1980–1994; 2007; 2018-present
- Labels: Greenworld; Medusa; Spandimeve; Sentinel Steel; Megaton; Marquee; No Remorse
- Past members: Kevin Lum; Robbie Littlejohn; Scott Dickerson
- Website: sacredrite.com

Sacred Rite is an American heavy metal band from Honolulu, Hawaii, formed in 1980. Sacred Rite was one of the two notable heavy metal bands from Honolulu (the other being Hawaii). The group's self-titled debut album was released in Europe on Axe Killer Records, which helped grow their fanbase and led to the band getting an opening act spot for Triumph during a tour stop in Hawaii. Sacred Rite relocated from Honolulu to Tulsa, Oklahoma in 1987. Drummer Kevin Lum left the band in 1988 due to complications from diabetes, and later died in 2002 as a result of heart failure.

In 2012 Sacred Rite's guitarists, Mark Kaleiwahea and Jimmy Caterine, as well as bassist Peter Crane were mentioned in, heavy metal journalist, Jeff Wagner's article Heavy Metal's Greatest Guitar Teams.

Sacred Rite reunited to perform in Phoenix, Arizona in 2018 and have since performed in 2019 at Keep It True in Germany and in 2024 at 2 Minutes to Tulsa.

== Members ==
=== Lineup ===
- Mark Kaleiwahea – vocals, guitar (1980–1989, 2007, 2018–present)
- Jimmy Dee Caterine – guitar (1980–1989, 2007, 2018–present)
- Peter Crane – bass (1980–1989, 2007, 2018–present)
- Dan (Deech) Froehlich - drums (2019–present)

=== Former members ===
- Kevin Lum – drums (1980–1988) (died 2002)
- Scott Dickerson – drums (1988–1989, 2018)
- Robbie Littlejohn – Vocals (1980)

== Discography ==
- Sacred Rite (1984)
- The Ritual (1985)
- Is Nothing Sacred? (1986)
- Rites of Passage, Vol. 1 (best of/compilation), (2002)
- Rites of Passage, vol. 2 (best of/compilation), (2002)
- Rendezvous Leftovers (best of/compilation), (2003)
- SR-IV (best of/compilation), (2003)
- Live (2005)
- Resurrection (2007)
