= List of Angel Witch members =

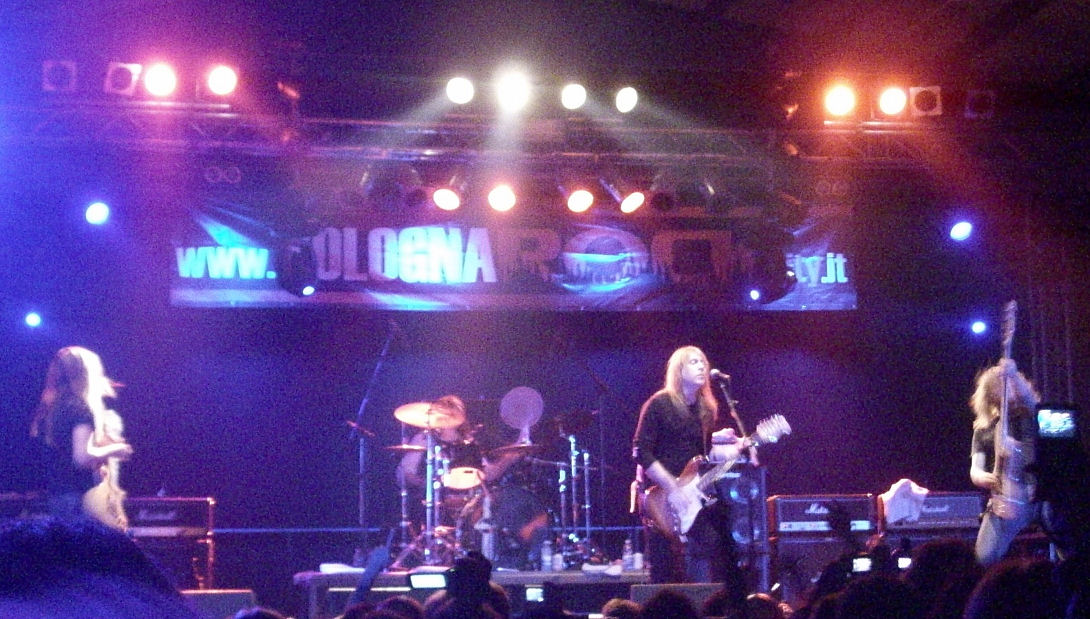
Angel Witch performing in 2010.

Angel Witch are a British heavy metal band from London. Formed in 1978 following the breakup of earlier outfit Lucifer, the group originally included vocalist and lead guitarist Kevin Heybourne, rhythm guitarist Rob Downing, bassist and keyboardist Kevin "Skids" Riddles, and drummer Dave "Day Vog" Hogg. The group's current lineup includes Heybourne, bassist Will Palmer (since 2009), rhythm guitarist Jimmy Martin (since 2015) and drummer Fredrik Jansson (since 2016).

== History ==
=== 1978–1990 ===
After the breakup of Lucifer in 1978, Kevin Heybourne and Rob Downing formed Angel Witch with bassist Kevin "Skids" Riddles and drummer Dave "Day Vog" Hogg. The band released their first demos over the next year, before Downing left in December 1979 and the group became a trio. Shortly after the recording of their self-titled debut album, Hogg was forced to leave Angel Witch due to illness, with Dave Dufort taking his place. In the second half of 1981, both Dufort and Riddles left to form Tytan together. Heybourne subsequently disbanded Angel Witch and joined Deep Machine.

Heybourne reformed Angel Witch less than a year later, bringing vocalist Roger Marsden and drummer Ricky Bruce from Deep Machine, and adding bassist Jerry Cunningham. Marsden left shortly after due to stylistic differences, with Heybourne taking up lead vocals again. By 1983, Angel Witch had disbanded again as Heybourne had joined Lou Taylor's new group Blind Fury, where he remained for "about eight months" before leaving at the end of the year. He reformed Angel Witch in 1984 with returning drummer Dave Hogg, plus bassist Peter Gordelier and vocalist Dave Tattum.

Shortly after the release of 1985's Screamin' 'n' Bleedin', Hogg left again and was replaced by Spencer Hollman. Frontal Assault followed the next year, after which Tattum was dismissed and Heybourne returned to the role of lead vocalist. Adding rhythm guitarist Grant Dennison, the band recorded a live album in 1989, Angel Witch Live, which was issued the following year.

=== 1990–2003 ===
In 1990, Heybourne moved to the United States and formed a new incarnation of Angel Witch with bassist Jon Torres and drummer Tom Hunting. The trio recorded the three-track demo Twist of the Knife, which remained unreleased until the Resurrection compilation in 2000. Adding rhythm guitarist Doug Piercy, the band planned a tour of the United States later in the year. However, due to legal issues regarding his immigration to the US, Heybourne was deported back to the UK. The band subsequently dissolved, as Heybourne returned to his full-time job as a tree surgeon.

In 1997, Heybourne, Torres and Hunting reunited in the UK to record the Resurrection demo, which was included alongside 1990's Twist of the Knife and 1987's Psychopathic demos on the compilation of the same name. The group reformed officially in early 2000, with Heybourne joined by guitarist Keith Herzberg, bassist Richie Wicks and drummer Scott Higham. After issuing 2000: Live at the LA2 and recording the Halloween Session demo, Higham left in mid-2001. The group subsequently decided to disband, although by the following summer had reformed with the same lineup.

The reformation of Heybourne, Herzberg, Wicks and Higham was short-lived, however, as in January 2003 the frontman announced a new lineup featuring guitarist Lee Altus and returning rhythm section Jon Torres and Tom Hunting. Within two months, Hunting had bowed out and been replaced by Altus's Heathen bandmate Darren Minter for a short run of shows.

=== Since 2008 ===
After another five-year break, Kevin Heybourne reformed Angel Witch in 2008, adding new guitarist Chris Fullard, bassist Will Palmer and drummer Andy Prestidge. In September 2010, Fullard was replaced by Carcass guitarist Bill Steer. 2012 saw the release of As Above, So Below, the group's first new studio material since 1998, and the following year saw Steer replaced by Tom Draper. By 2015, Draper had been replaced by Jimmy Martin, and the following year Fredrik Jansson had taken over on drums, following a brief stint by Alan French following Prestidge's departure.

In 2019, Angel Witch released their fifth full-length studio album, Angel of Light.

Bassist and keyboardist Kevin Riddles died on 4 July 2025, at the age of 68.

== Members ==
=== Current ===
| Image | Name | Years active | Instruments | Release contributions |
|---|---|---|---|---|
| | Kevin Heybourne | 1976–1981; 1982–1983; 1984–1990; 1997–1998; 2000–2001; 2002–2003; 2008–present | lead guitar; lead and backing vocals | all Angel Witch releases |
| | Will Palmer | 2008–present | bass | all Angel Witch releases from Burn the White Witch: Live in London (2009) onwards, except Seventies Tapes (2017) |
| | Jimmy Martin | 2015–present | rhythm guitar; backing vocals | Angel of Light (2019) |
| | Fredrik Jansson | 2016–present | drums | Angel of Light (2019) |

=== Former ===
| Image | Name | Years active | Instruments | Release contributions |
|---|---|---|---|---|
| | Barry Clements | 1978 | Bass | |
| | Steve Coleman | 1978 | Drums | None |
| | Kevin "Skids" Riddles | 1978–1981 (died 2025) | bass; keyboards; backing vocals | all Angel Witch releases from 1978 demo to Give It Some Tickle (1981); Sinister History (1999) |
| | Dave "Day Vog" Hogg | 1978–1980; 1984–1985 | drums; percussion; backing vocals | all Angel Witch releases from 1978 demo to Angel Witch (1981); Screamin' 'n' Bleedin' (1985); Sinister History (1999) |
| | Rob Downing | 1978–1979 | rhythm guitar | 1978 demo; 1979 demo; Sinister History (1999) |
| | Dave Dufort | 1980–1981 | drums | "Loser" (1981); Give It Some Tickle (1981); Sinister History (1999) |
| | Jerry Cunningham | 1982–1983 | bass | Demo #3 (1983); '82 Revisited (1996) |
| | Ricky Bruce | 1982–1983 | drums | Demo #3 (1983); '82 Revisited (1996) |
| | Roger Marsden | 1982 | lead vocals | none |
| | Pete Gordelier | 1984–1989 | bass; backing vocals | Screamin' 'n' Bleedin' (1985); Frontal Assault (1986); Psychopathic demo (1987); Angel Witch Live (1990) |
| | Dave Tattum | 1984–1986 | lead vocals | Screamin' 'n' Bleedin' (1985); Frontal Assault (1986) |
| | Spencer Hollman | 1986–1989 | drums; backing vocals | Frontal Assault (1986); Psychopathic demo (1987); Angel Witch Live (1990) |
| | Grant Dennison | 1989 | rhythm guitar | Angel Witch Live (1990) |
| | Jon Torres | 1990; 1997; 2003; (died 2013) | bass; rhythm guitar | Twist of the Knife demo (1990); Resurrection demo (1998) |
| | Tom Hunting | 1990; 1997; 2003 | drums; backing vocals | Twist of the Knife demo (1990); Resurrection demo (1998) |
| | Doug Piercy | 1990 | rhythm guitar | none |
| | Myk Taylor | 1997 (died 2003) | rhythm guitar; keyboards | Resurrection demo (1998) |
| | Keith Herzberg | 2000–2001; 2002 | rhythm guitar | 2000: Live at the LA2 (2000); The Halloween Session demo (2000) |
| | Richie Wicks | 2000–2001; 2002 | bass; backing vocals | 2000: Live at the LA2 (2000); The Halloween Session demo (2000) |
| | Scott Higham | 2000–2001; 2002 | drums | 2000: Live at the LA2 (2000); The Halloween Session demo (2000) |
| | Lee Altus | 2003 | rhythm guitar | none |
| | Andy Prestidge | 2008–2015 | drums | Burn the White Witch: Live in London (2009); As Above, So Below (2012) |
| | Chris Fullard | 2008–2009 | rhythm guitar | none |
| | Bill Steer | 2010–2013 | rhythm guitar | none |
| | Tom Draper | 2013–2015 | rhythm guitar | none |
| | Alan French | 2015–2016 | drums | none |

== Lineups ==
| Period | Members | Releases |
|---|---|---|
| 1978–1979 | Kevin Heybourne – lead guitar, lead vocals; Rob Downing – rhythm guitar; Kevin Riddles – bass, keyboards, backing vocals; Dave Hogg – drums, percussion, backing vocals | Untitled 1978 demo; Untitled 1979 demo; Sinister History (1999) – two live tracks |
| December 1979 – December 1980 | Kevin Heybourne – guitars, lead vocals; Kevin Riddles – bass, keyboards, backing vocals; Dave Hogg – drums, percussion, backing vocals | Sweet Danger (1980); Angel Witch (1980) |
| December 1980 – September 1981 | Kevin Heybourne – guitars, lead vocals; Kevin Riddles – bass, keyboards, backing vocals; Dave Dufort – drums | "Loser" (1981); Give It Some Tickle (1981); Sinister History (1999) – four live tracks |
Band inactive September 1981 – early 1982
| Early 1982 | Kevin Heybourne – guitars, backing vocals; Roger Marsden – lead vocals; Jerry Cunningham – bass; Ricky Bruce – drums | none |
| Mid-1982 – early 1983 | Kevin Heybourne – guitars, vocals; Jerry Cunningham – bass; Ricky Bruce – drums | Demo #3 (1983); '82 Revisited (1996) |
Band inactive early 1983 – early 1984
| Early 1984 – late 1985 | Kevin Heybourne – guitars, backing vocals; Dave Hogg – drums, backing vocals; Dave Tattum – lead vocals; Pete Gordelier – bass, backing vocals | Screamin' 'n' Bleedin' (1985) |
| 1985–1986 | Kevin Heybourne – guitars, backing vocals; Dave Tattum – lead vocals; Pete Gordelier – bass, backing vocals; Spencer Hollman – drums, backing vocals | Frontal Assault (1986) |
| 1986–1989 | Kevin Heybourne – guitars, lead vocals; Pete Gordelier – bass, backing vocals; Spencer Hollman – drums, backing vocals | Psychopathic demo (1987) |
| 1989 | Kevin Heybourne – lead guitar, lead vocals; Pete Gordelier – bass, backing vocals; Spencer Hollman – drums, backing vocals; Grant Dennison – rhythm guitar | Angel Witch Live (1990) |
| 1990 | Kevin Heybourne – guitars, lead vocals; Jon Torres – bass; Tom Hunting – drums, backing vocals | Twist of the Knife demo (1990) |
| 1990 | Kevin Heybourne – lead guitar, lead vocals; Jon Torres – bass; Tom Hunting – drums, backing vocals; Doug Pierce – rhythm guitar | none |
Band inactive 1990–1997
| 1997 (temporary recording lineup) | Kevin Heybourne – lead guitar, lead vocals; Jon Torres – bass, rhythm guitar; Tom Hunting – drums, backing vocals; Myk Taylor – rhythm guitar, keyboards | Resurrection demo (1998) |
Band inactive 1997–2000
| Early 2000 – mid-2001 | Kevin Heybourne – lead guitar, lead vocals; Keith Herzberg – rhythm guitar; Richie Wicks – bass, backing vocals; Scott Higham – drums | 2000: Live at the LA2 (2000); The Halloween Session demo (2000) |
Band inactive late 2001 – summer 2002
| Summer 2002 | Kevin Heybourne – lead guitar, lead vocals; Keith Herzberg – rhythm guitar; Richie Wicks – bass, backing vocals; Scott Higham – drums | none |
| January – March 2003 | Kevin Heybourne – lead guitar, lead vocals; Jon Torres – bass; Tom Hunting – drums, backing vocals; Lee Altus – rhythm guitar | none |
| March – summer 2003 | Kevin Heybourne – lead guitar, lead vocals; Jon Torres – bass; Lee Altus – rhythm guitar; Darren Minter – drums | none |
Band inactive summer 2003 – summer 2008
| Summer 2008 – September 2010 | Kevin Heybourne – lead guitar, lead vocals; Will Palmer – bass; Andy Prestidge – drums; Chris Fullard – rhythm guitar | Burn the White Witch: Live in London (2009) (does not feature Fullard) |
| September 2010 – 2013 | Kevin Heybourne – lead guitar, lead vocals; Will Palmer – bass; Andy Prestidge – drums; Bill Steer – rhythm guitar | As Above, So Below (2012) (does not feature Steer) |
| 2013–2015 | Kevin Heybourne – lead guitar, lead vocals; Will Palmer – bass; Andy Prestidge – drums; Tom Draper – rhythm guitar | none |
| 2015–2016 | Kevin Heybourne – lead guitar, lead vocals; Will Palmer – bass; Jimmy Martin – rhythm guitar; Alan French – drums | none |
| 2016–present | Kevin Heybourne – lead guitar, lead vocals; Will Palmer – bass; Jimmy Martin – rhythm guitar; Fredrik Jansson – drums | Angel of Light (2019) |
