= List of Grim Reaper band members =

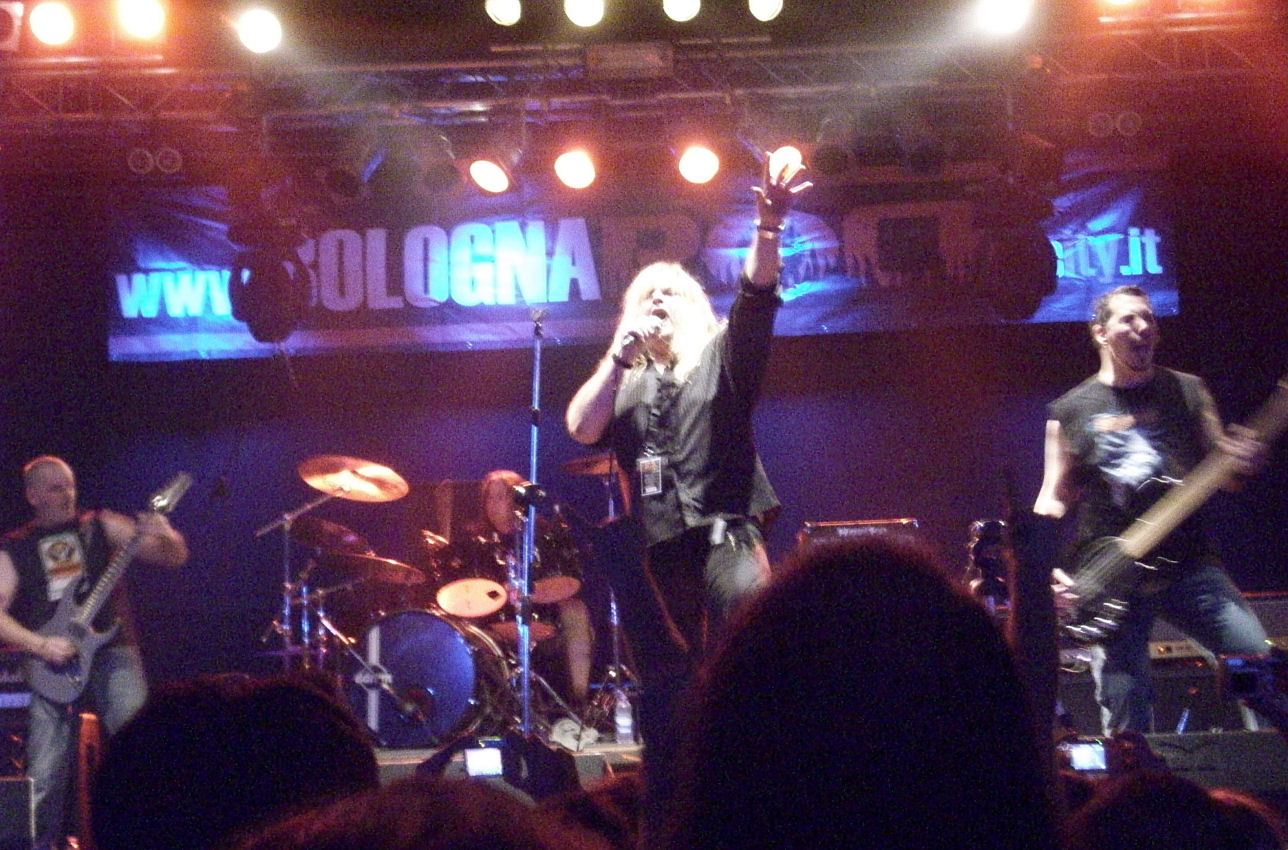
Grim Reaper performing live in 2010.

Grim Reaper were an English heavy metal band from Droitwich Spa. Formed in 1979, the group originally featured vocalist Paul De Mercado, guitarist Nick Bowcott, bassist Kevin Neale and drummer Lee Harris. After disbanding in 1981, the band reunited a year later with new vocalist Steve Grimmett, who fronted the band until their breakup in 1988. Grimmett subsequently reformed Grim Reaper in 2006 with guitarist Ian Nash, bassist Ritchie Walker and drummer Pete Newdeck. The final lineup of the band, active until Grimmett's death in August 2022, featured Nash alongside bassist Julian Hill and drummer Steve Grice, both of whom joined in 2018.

== History ==
=== 1979–1988 ===
Guitarist Nick Bowcott formed Grim Reaper in 1979 with vocalist Paul De Mercado, bassist Kevin Neale and drummer Lee Harris. Harris was soon replaced by Adrian Jacques, before Dave Wanklin took over from Neale, who left to attend university. Shortly after recording their first demo Bleed 'Em Dry, Wanklin left due to "personality issues", with Phil Matthews taking his place. Shortly thereafter, Jacques also left to attend university, with Brian Parry taking his place on drums. By the end of 1981, Grim Reaper had disbanded, reportedly due to "a rift" between Bowcott and De Mercado.

In May 1982, Bowcott introduced a new lineup of the band, initially dubbed "Grim Reaper II", which featured new vocalist Steve Grimmett alongside returning members Dave Wanklin and Lee Harris. The new lineup released the band's first full-length album, See You in Hell, in November 1983. By early 1985, Harris had been replaced by Mark Simon, who debuted on that May's Fear No Evil album. This was followed in September 1987 by the band's third album, Rock You to Hell. Prior to touring for the album, Wanklin left for "health reasons", with Geoff Curtis taking his place. Curtis toured with the band into 1988, but was later replaced by Benje Brittan as, according to Bowcott, he "never really committed himself". Before the end of the year, Grim Reaper disbanded due to record label disputes.

=== 2006–2022 ===
In February 2006, Steve Grimmett reformed Grim Reaper with an entirely new lineup consisting of guitarist Ian Nash, bassist Ritchie Walker and drummer Pete Newdeck. This lineup released the album Personal Crisis in 2007, which was instead credited to Grimmett as a solo release. The band subsequently changed their name to "Steve Grimmett's Grim Reaper", to differentiate it from the original incarnation. By 2010, Walker and Newdeck had been replaced by Chaz Grimaldi and Mark Rumble, respectively. In 2011, the band issued their first release since reforming, the live EP Alive and Kicking. In April 2014, Nick Bowcott performed with Grim Reaper for the first time since their breakup in 1988. By the following month, Rumble had been replaced in the band's lineup by Paul "Needles" White.

In late 2015, Nash took a break from the band to spend time with his family, with Richie Yeates temporarily taking his place. Martin Trail took over on bass the next spring, contributing to the band's first studio album since 1987, Walking in the Shadows. Nash returned briefly for a run of shows in the summer of 2016, with Steve Stine taking over in the autumn, before Nash returned again. During shows throughout 2016, Bowcott returned again as an occasional guest performer. By August 2018, Trail and White had been replaced by Julian Hill and Mark Pullin, respectively. The new lineup released At the Gates in October 2019. A live album recorded on their first tour, Reaping the Whirlwind, was released in 2022. During the COVID-19 pandemic, Grimmett and Bowcott reunited again for a remote performance.

Steve Grimmett died on 15 August 2022. Shortly after his death, the surviving Grim Reaper band members performed a festival set with Nick Bowcott and a range of guest vocalists, including Grimmett's son Russ and Jag Panzer's Harry Conklin. Bowcott (with Conklin) later reunited with 1985–1987 members Dave Wanklin and Mark Simon for a performance in November 2024.

== Members ==
Name	Years active	Instruments	Release contributions
Nick Bowcott	1979–1981; 1982–1988 (plus live guest appearances in 2014 and 2016)	guitar; backing vocals	all Grim Reaper releases from Bleed 'Em Dry (1981) to Rock You to Hell (1987)
Paul De Mercado	1979–1981	lead vocals	Bleed 'Em Dry (1981)
Kevin Neale	1979	bass	none
Lee Harris	1979; 1982–1985	drums	For Demonstration Only demos (1982/83); See You in Hell (1983)
Adrian "Angel" Jacques	1979–1981	drums	Bleed 'Em Dry (1981)
Dave "Chief" Wanklin	1979–1981; 1982–1987	bass	all Grim Reaper releases from Bleed 'Em Dry (1981) to Rock You to Hell (1987)
Phil Matthews	1981	bass	none
Brian Parry	1981	drums	none
Steve Grimmett (1959–2022)	1982–1988; 2006–2022	lead vocals	all Grim Reaper releases except Bleed 'Em Dry (1981)
Mark Simon	1985–1988	drums; backing vocals	Fear No Evil (1985); Rock You to Hell (1987)
Geoff Curtis	1987–1988	bass; backing vocals	none
Benje Brittan	1988	bass; backing vocals	none
Ian Nash	2006–2015; 2016–2022	guitar; backing vocals	all Steve Grimmett's Grim Reaper releases
Ritchie Walker	2006–2010	bass; backing vocals	none
Pete Newdeck	2006–2010	drums	none
Chaz Grimaldi	2010–2016	bass; backing vocals	Alive and Kicking (2011)
Mark Rumble	2010–2014	drums	Alive and Kicking (2011)
Paul "Needles" White	2014–2018	drums	Walking in the Shadows (2016)
Richie Yeates	2015–2016	guitar; backing vocals	none
Martin Trail	2016–2018	bass; backing vocals	Walking in the Shadows (2016)
Steve Stine	2016	guitar; backing vocals	none
Julian Hill	2018–2022	bass; backing vocals	At the Gates (2019); Reaping the Whirlwind (2022)
Mark Pullin	2018–2022	drums	At the Gates (2019); Reaping the Whirlwind (2022)

== Lineups ==
Lineups as Grim Reaper

Period	Members	Releases
1979	Paul De Mercado — lead vocals; Nick Bowcott — guitar, backing vocals; Kevin Neale — bass; Lee Harris — drums	none
1979	Paul De Mercado — lead vocals; Nick Bowcott — guitar, backing vocals; Kevin Neale — bass; Adrian Jacques — drums	none
1979–1981	Paul De Mercado — lead vocals; Nick Bowcott — guitar, backing vocals; Paul Wanklin — bass; Adrian Jacques — drums	Bleed 'Em Dry (1981)
1981	Paul De Mercado — lead vocals; Nick Bowcott — guitar, backing vocals; Phil Matthews — bass; Adrian Jacques — drums	none
1981	Paul De Mercado — lead vocals; Nick Bowcott — guitar, backing vocals; Phil Matthews — bass; Brian Parry — drums	none
Band inactive late 1981–early 1982
May 1982–early 1985	Steve Grimmett — lead vocals; Nick Bowcott — guitar, backing vocals; Dave Wanklin — bass; Lee Harris — drums	For Demonstration Only demos (1982/83); See You in Hell (1983)
Early 1985–summer 1987	Steve Grimmett — lead vocals; Nick Bowcott — guitar, backing vocals; Dave Wanklin — bass; Mark Simon — drums, backing vocals	Fear No Evil (1985); Rock You to Hell (1987)
Summer 1987–early 1988	Steve Grimmett — lead vocals; Nick Bowcott — guitar, backing vocals; Geoff Curtis — bass, backing vocals; Mark Simon — drums, backing vocals	none
Spring–summer 1988	Steve Grimmett — lead vocals; Nick Bowcott — guitar, backing vocals; Benje Brittan — bass, backing vocals; Mark Simon — drums, backing vocals	none

Lineups as Steve Grimmett's Grim Reaper

Period	Members	Releases
February 2006–2010	Steve Grimmett — lead vocals; Ian Nash — guitar, backing vocals; Ritchie Walker — bass, backing vocals; Pete Newdeck — drums	none
2010–May 2014	Steve Grimmett — lead vocals; Ian Nash — guitar, backing vocals; Chaz Grimaldi — bass, backing vocals; Mark Rumble — drums	Alive and Kicking (2011)
May 2014–late 2015	Steve Grimmett — lead vocals; Ian Nash — guitar, backing vocals; Chaz Grimaldi — bass, backing vocals; Paul White — drums	none
Late 2015–spring 2016	Steve Grimmett — lead vocals; Richie Yeates — guitar, backing vocals; Chaz Grimaldi — bass, backing vocals; Paul White — drums	none
Spring–summer 2016	Steve Grimmett — lead vocals; Richie Yeates — guitar, backing vocals; Martin Trail — bass, backing vocals; Paul White — drums	Walking in the Shadows (2016) (features Ian Nash in place of Richie Yeates)
Summer–fall 2016	Steve Grimmett — lead vocals; Ian Nash — guitar, backing vocals; Martin Trail — bass, backing vocals; Paul White — drums	none
Fall–late 2016	Steve Grimmett — lead vocals; Steve Stine — guitar, backing vocals; Martin Trail — bass, backing vocals; Paul White — drums	none
Late 2016–August 2018	Steve Grimmett — lead vocals; Ian Nash — guitar, backing vocals; Martin Trail — bass, backing vocals; Paul White — drums	none
August 2018–August 2022	Steve Grimmett — lead vocals; Ian Nash — guitar, backing vocals; Julian Hill — bass, backing vocals; Mark Pullin — drums	At the Gates (2019); Reaping the Whirlwind (2022)
