= Origins of Aggression =

Studio album by Onslaught
- Released: 23 May 2025
- Recorded: 2022–2024
- Studio: Hansen Studios, Ribe, Denmark
- Genre: Thrash metal
- Length: 85:00
- Label: Reigning Phoenix

Onslaught chronology
Generation Antichrist (2020)	Origins of Aggression (2025)

Singles from Origins of Aggression
- 1. "Iron Fist" Released: 27 March 2025

Professional ratings
Review scores
Source	Rating
All About the Rock	1/10
Blabbermouth.net	8/10
Ghost Cult Magazine	8/10
KNAC	3.5/5

Origins of Aggression is the eighth studio album by British thrash metal band Onslaught, released on 23 May 2025. It is their first studio album to be released via Reigning Phoenix Music. Origins of Aggression is a double album to celebrate the 40th anniversary of their 1985 debut Power from Hell, with the first disc consisting of re-recordings of tracks from the band's 1980s releases, and the second disc consisting of covers of songs by punk and metal bands that influenced Onslaught in their earlier years. This album marked the first time Onslaught have recorded more than one album with the same line-up, although it ended up being the last to feature guitarist Wayne Dorman and vocalist Dave Garnett who were both out of the band by mid-2025.

== Background ==
Origins of Aggression is the band's first album in five years, since 2020's Generation Antichrist. Part of the reason was founding guitarist Nige Rockett's battle with cancer, from which he was later declared in remission after two spinal operations. The cancer and surgeries caused him to lose the use of his arms "for maybe six to nine months."

== Reception ==
Origins of Aggression has mostly received positive reviews from critics. At Metal Talk, Paul Hutchings has stated despite the album being "a mixed bag", "there is a better, crisper production, and singer Dave Garnett certainly has the chops to follow the likes of Paul Mahoney, Sy Keeler and Steve Grimmett (RIP). The intensity has also been ramped up slightly, if that is possible, as has the tempo."

Rick of The Moshville Times praised the album and concluded, "Throughout the collection, there are elements of quintessential Onslaught, and it refreshingly feels like a project crafted with genuine effort and passion, rather than something lazily thrown together for the sake of nostalgia. The combination overall makes for a fast-paced and thoroughly enjoyable listen."

== Track listing ==
Disc 1 (re-recordings)
No.	Title	Original album (year)	Length
1.	"Thermonuclear Devastation of the Planet Earth"	Power from Hell (1985)	1:54
2.	"Black Horse of Famine"	demos (1983-1984)	1:27
3.	"Angels of Death"	Power from Hell (1985)	2:38
4.	"Power from Hell"	Power from Hell (1985)	4:50
5.	"Metal Forces"	The Force (1986)	5:19
6.	"Let There Be Death"	The Force (1986)	5:36
7.	"Fight with the Beast"	The Force (1986)	5:24
8.	"Thrash Till the Death"	The Force (1986)	4:27
9.	"In Search of Sanity"	In Search of Sanity (1989)	6:48
10.	"Shellshock"	In Search of Sanity (1989)	6:33
Total length:			44:56

Disc 2 (covers)
No.	Title	Original artist (year)	Length
1.	"Iron Fist"	Motörhead (1982)	2:42
2.	"Holiday in Cambodia"	Dead Kennedys (1980)	3:47
3.	"A Look at Tomorrow"	Discharge (1981)	1:54
4.	"U.K. 82"	The Exploited (1982)	2:54
5.	"Freewheel Burning"	Judas Priest (1984)	4:28
6.	"Wardance"	Killing Joke (1980)	3:25
7.	"Give Me Fire"	GBH (1984)	2:30
8.	"State Violence State Control"	Discharge (1982)	2:29
9.	"Holidays in the Sun"	Sex Pistols (1977)	3:01
10.	"Emotional Blackmail"	U.K. Subs (1980)	2:19
11.	"War Pigs"	Black Sabbath (1970)	7:37
12.	"Drunk with Power"	Discharge (1982)	2:58
Total length:			44:04

== Personnel ==
Credits adapted from Tidal.

=== Onslaught ===
- James Perry – drums, production
- Jeff Williams – electric bass guitar, production
- Nige Rockett – electric guitar, production
- Wayne Dorman – electric guitar, production
- Dave Garnett – lead vocals, production

=== Additional contributors ===
- Jacob Hansen – mixing, mastering
- Caio Mendonca – mixing
