= See You in Hell =

See You in Hell may refer to:

- See You in Hell (album), by Grim Reaper, or the title song, 1984
- See You in Hell, an album by Puerto Muerto, 2004
- "See You in Hell", a song by Monster Magnet from Powertrip, 1998
- "See You in Hell (Don't Be Late)", a song by Yngwie Malmsteen from Eclipse, 1990
- "See U in Hell", a song by Papa Roach and Hanumankind, 2026
