= Best of Grim Reaper =

Compilation album by Grim Reaper
- Released: September 28, 1999
- Label: RCA

Grim Reaper chronology
See You in Hell/Fear No Evil (1999)	Best of Grim Reaper (1999)

Professional ratings
Review scores
Source	Rating
AllMusic	4/5 stars

Best of Grim Reaper is a compilation album by Grim Reaper. The songs are drawn from Grim Reaper's singles and albums.

== Track listing ==
All songs written by Bowcott and Grimmett, except where noted

1. "See You in Hell" – 4:17
2. "Fear No Evil" – 4:01
3. "Rock You to Hell" – 4:02
4. "Wrath of the Reaper" – 3:13
5. "Lust for Freedom" – 4:27
6. "Never Coming Back" – 3:35
7. "All Hell Let Loose" – 4:24
8. "The Show Must Go On" (Bowcott, DeMercado) – 7:27
9. "Let the Thunder Roar" – 4:08
10. "Run for Your Life" – 3:40
11. "Waysted Love" (Bowcott, DeMercado) – 4:19
12. "Now or Never" – 2:52
13. "Fight for the Last" – 2:59
14. "Dead on Arrival" – 4:32
15. "Lay It on the Line" – 4:07
16. "Suck It and See" – 2:32
17. "Final Scream" – 5:28
