= Sounds of Violence =

Studio album by Onslaught
- Released: 28 January 2011
- Recorded: August–October 2010
- Studio: Hansen Studios, Ribe, Denmark
- Genre: Thrash metal
- Length: 47:42
- Label: AFM
- Producer: Jacob Hansen

Onslaught chronology
| Killing Peace (2007) | Sounds of Violence (2011) | VI (2013) |

Professional ratings
Review scores
| Source | Rating |
|---|---|
| AllMusic | 3/5 stars |
| Metal Forces | (9/10) |

Sounds of Violence is the fifth studio album by English thrash metal band Onslaught, released on 28 January 2011 through AFM Records in Europe and 8 February in North America. This was Onslaught's first album not to feature a new singer, as Sy Keeler remained with the band after their previous album Killing Peace. In addition to standard CD formats, Sounds of Violence was also released on limited black vinyl (only 666 copies) in a gatefold sleeve and a Limited Digipack. For the Japanese release the album also featured a re-recording of "Angels of Death" and "Thermonuclear Devastation" taken from their debut album Power from Hell. Sounds of Violence outsold the previous album Killing Peace in less than one year. In February 2012, the band has been listed by the webzine Metal Storm as the sixth best Thrash Metal Album of 2011.

== Track listing ==
All lyrics are written by Nige Rockett; all music is composed by Nige Rockett and Andy Rosser-Davies

| No. | Title | Length |
|---|---|---|
| 1. | "Into the Abyss" (intro) | 1:01 |
| 2. | "Born for War" | 5:56 |
| 3. | "The Sound of Violence" | 4:05 |
| 4. | "Code Black" | 6:23 |
| 5. | "Rest in Pieces" | 4:43 |
| 6. | "Godhead" | 4:51 |
| 7. | "Hatebox" | 4:52 |
| 8. | "Antitheist" | 6:33 |
| 9. | "Suicideology" | 5:13 |
| 10. | "End of the Storm" (outro) | 1:31 |
| 11. | "Bomber" (Motörhead cover, feat. Phil Campbell & Tom Angelripper) | 2:51 |

== Personnel ==
- Sy Keeler - vocals
- Nige Rockett - guitar
- Andy Rosser-Davies - guitar
- Jeff Williams - bass
- Steve Grice - drums
