= Generation Antichrist =

Studio album by Onslaught
- Released: 7 August 2020
- Recorded: 2020
- Studio: Dugout Studios, Uppsala, Sweden
- Genre: Thrash metal
- Length: 37:53
- Label: AFM Records
- Producer: Wayne Dorman, Nige Rockett, Karl Groom, Pete Hinton

Onslaught chronology
VI (2013)	Generation Antichrist (2020)	Origins of Aggression (2025)

Singles from Generation Antichrist
- 1. "Religiousuicide" Released: 29 May 2020

Generation Antichrist is the seventh studio album by British thrash metal band Onslaught, released on 7 August 2020. It is their first studio album since 2013's VI, and the first not to feature Sy Keeler on vocals since 1989's In Search of Sanity. As such, Generation Antichrist was the band's first album to feature Keeler's replacement Dave Garnett, as well as two new members, James Perry (drums) and Wayne Dorman (guitar). It is also Onslaught's only album of all-new material with Garnett and Dorman.

"Religiousuicide" was released as the album's sole single, while its closing track "A Perfect Day to Die" is a re-recording of their one-off single from 2019, which had Keeler on vocals and was dedicated to Lemmy of Motörhead, who "were a major influence for Onslaught over the years."

== Reception ==
Professional ratings
Review scores
Source	Rating
Blabbermouth.net	8.5/10
KNAC	4/5
The Metal Crypt	3.5/5

Generation Antichrist received positive reviews from critics. At Blabbermouth.net, Dom Lawson gave the album a rating of eight-and-a-half out of ten, and wrote, "Founder and chief riff writer Nige Rockett has always been the model of vicious consistency, but even he must be delighted with the explosiveness of his band's retooled lineup. Living up to its title,'Strike Fast Strike Hard' hammers home the Onslaught manifesto anew via a cavalcade of scything riffs, greatly enhanced by a wickedly beefy and powerful production and the jabbing blade of Garnett's feral threats. If the hairs stood up on the back of your neck when you heard the new Testament album for the first time, you can expect the same result here: whether through experience or sheer bloody-mindedness, Onslaught have never sounded more psychotically dedicated to the cause of wrecking necks." Lawson also called every song on the album "a winner."

KNAC.com contributor Peter Atkinson praised Daniel Bergstrand's involvement in the production of Generation Antichrist, and described the sound as "crisp, punchy and super heavy, nicely capturing the aggression and tenacity of the performances." He continued, "The new blood certainly seems to have given the band a boot in the ass here, and Bergstrand has managed to not only get it all on tape – or a hard drive or whatever – but ensure that it comes through on the finished product."

== Track listing ==
Generation Antichrist track listing
No.	Title	Length
1.	"Rise to Power"	2:05
2.	"Strike Fast Strike Hard"	4:38
3.	"Bow Down to the Clowns"	4:50
4.	"Generation Antichrist"	5:43
5.	"All Seeing Eye"	3:50
6.	"Addicted to the Smell of Death"	3:55
7.	"Empires Fall"	5:34
8.	"Religiousuicide"	3:28
9.	"A Perfect Day to Die" (2020 version)	3:50
Total length:		37:53

== Personnel ==
- Nige Rockett – guitar
- Jeff Williams – bass
- James Perry – drums
- Wayne Dorman – guitar
- Dave Garnett – vocals

== Charts ==
Chart performance for Generation Antichrist
Chart (2020)	Peak position
German Albums (Offizielle Top 100)	52
Swiss Albums (Schweizer Hitparade)	57
