= Power from Hell =

Power from Hell may refer to:

- Power from Hell (Onslaught album), or the title track
- Power from Hell (Toxic Holocaust album), 2004
