= Chateaux (band) =

British heavy metal band

- Also known as: Stealer (1981)
- Origin: Cheltenham, United Kingdom
- Genres: Heavy metal
- Years active: 1981–1986
- Labels: Ebony, Sanctuary
- Past members: Tim Broughton; Chris Dadson; Krys Mason; Steve Grimmett; Alex Houston; Andre Baylis

Chateaux were a new wave of British heavy metal band formed in 1981 in Cheltenham, Gloucestershire, United Kingdom. They released three albums during the 1980s through Ebony Records, then home to the likes of Grim Reaper and Savage. The band is notable for launching the career of Steve Grimmett, later of Grim Reaper and Onslaught.

== Biography ==
The band were originally formed under the name of Stealer circa 1981 by guitarist Tim Broughton, bassist Alex Houston and drummer Andre Baylis. They were selected by the newly started Ebony Records for inclusion on their 1982 Metal Maniaxe compilation, changing their name to Chateaux and contributing the track "Young Blood"; at the time, bassist Alex Houston was providing vocals, and the song was later released as a single by Ebony, backed with "Fight to the Last". 1983 saw the release of the band's debut album, Chained and Desperate, again on Ebony Records, produced by Daryl Johnson, and featuring vocals by ex-Medusa and then-Grim Reaper man Steve Grimmett. For reasons unknown, the band insisted that Grimmett's appearance was simply that of a guest, allowing him to remain focussed on Grim Reaper. The cover art was provided by MusicMight's Garry Sharpe-Young, Martin Popoff, in his Collector's Guide to Heavy Metal, described the album as "riding the same mysterious mood as Reaper's first, Diamond Head, Savage, and Witchfinder General, Chained and Desperate combines integrity, songcraft, and grime in way rarely seen outside the confines of these early Brit masters. A swirling cauldron of glorious noise. 9/10."

Only guitarist and chief songwriter Broughton remained by the release of Chateaux's second LP, Fire Power (Ebony, 1984). Replacing Baylis and Houston were bassist/vocalist Krys Mason (ex-Confessor) and drummer Chris Dadson (ex-Wolfbane, Sam Thunder and Aragorn). The second record was less well received than the debut, with Eduardo Rivadavia of Allmusic remarking that, "the second [record was] surprisingly plain and unremarkable by comparison" and Popoff commenting that "songwriting focus is lost, the singular garage din of the debut heaving forth to both OTT excursions and flirtation with AOR rock structures." The band saw a further decline with the release of their third album, Highly Strung (1985), and poor sales and the band's reluctance to tour outside their local region led to the band disbanding. Nonetheless, Sanctuary Records re-released all three albums and the debut single as the Fight to the Last 2CD compilation in 2003.

== Line-up ==
=== Last known line-up ===
- Tim Broughton (guitar)
- Chris Dadson (drums)
- Krys Mason (bass, vocals)

=== Previous members ===
- Steve Grimmett (vocals)
- Alex Houston (bass, vocals)
- Andre Baylis (drums)

== Discography ==
- "Young Blood / Fight to the Last" 7" single (Ebony, 1982)
- Chained and Desperate LP (Ebony, 1983)
- Fire Power LP (Ebony, 1984)
- Highly Strung LP (Ebony, 1985)
- Fight to the Last compilation (Sanctuary, 2003)

== See also ==
- List of new wave of British heavy metal bands
