= Angel of Light (album) =

Studio album by Angel Witch
- Released: November 1, 2019
- Studio: The Stationhouse Studio, Leeds, England
- Genre: Heavy metal
- Length: 47:43
- Label: Metal Blade
- Producer: James Atkinson

Angel Witch chronology
As Above, So Below (2012)	Angel of Light (2019)

Angel of Light is the fifth studio album by British heavy metal band Angel Witch. "The Night Is Calling" and "Don't Turn Your Back" represent the first official recording of two songs the band played live in the 80s, and which were previously available on bootlegs. 'The Night Is Calling' has also been covered by pre-Candlemass band Nemesis. An official music video was made for "Death from Andromeda". The album was released digitally, as a digipack CD, by itself or in a bundle with merch, and in vinyl. A limited edition Vinyl / CD Boxset limited to 1000 copies was also released which contained: A Red/white/black marbled vinyl, the digipack CD, and 7" containing re-recorded versions of "Frontal Assault' & 'Straight from Hell"; As well as a Baphomet flag, Angel of Light backpatch and art print.

== Reception ==
Professional ratings
Review scores
Source	Rating
Sonic Perspectives	9.1/10 stars
Blabbermouth	8.5/10
Angry Metal Guy	3/5 stars
Metal-Rules	5/5 stars

A review on Sonic Perspectives considered it a perfect followup to 2012s As Above, So Below, stating how "Angel Witch returns with an album chock full of riffs and doomy atmosphere to please even the most avid fan of the band." And that it feels more like a direct follow-up to their 80s Angel Witch than anything else.

== Track listing ==
All lyrics are written by Kevin Heybourne, except where noted; all music is composed by Kevin Heybourne.

No.	Title	Lyrics	Length
1.	"Don't Turn Your Back"	Kevin Heybourne, Will Palmer, Jimmy Martin	4:55
2.	"Death from Andromeda"	Heybourne, Palmer, James Atkinson	6:24
3.	"We Are Damned"	Heybourne, Atkinson	5:59
4.	"The Night Is Calling"	Heybourne, S. Heath	7:21
5.	"Condemned"		5:30
6.	"Window of Despair"		5:19
7.	"I Am Infamy"	Heybourne, Palmer, Atkinson	5:34
8.	"Angel of Light"		6:41
9.	"The Night is Calling (demo)" (Japan release)	Heybourne, Heath	7:21
Total length:			47:43

== Personnel ==
Angel Witch

- Kevin Heybourne - lead guitar, vocals
- Jimmy Martin - rhythm guitar, electronics (track 2)
- Will Palmer - bass
- Fredrik Jansson-Punkka - drums

Session members

- James Atkinson - organ (track 8), backing vocals

Production

- James Atkinson - producer, engineering, mixing, lyrics (tracks 2, 3, 7)
- Terry Waker - mastering
- Adam Burke - cover art
- Branca Studio - layout
- Ester Segarra - photography
- Jimmy Martin - lyrics (track 1)
- Will Palmer - lyrics (tracks 1, 2, 7)
- S. Heath - lyrics (track 4)

== Charts ==
Chart (2019)	Peak position
German Albums (Offizielle Top 100)	47
UK Independent Albums (OCC)	39
UK Rock & Metal Albums (OCC)	13
