= Angel Witch =

English heavy metal band

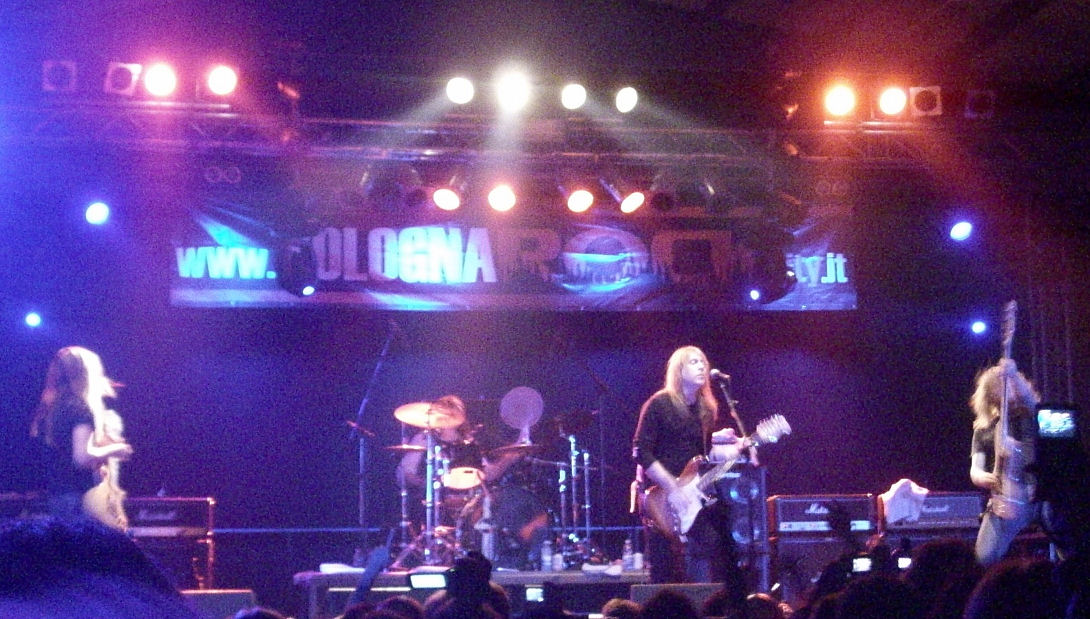
- Angel Witch live 2010

Background information
- Also known as: Lucifer
- Origin: London, England
- Genres: Heavy metal
- Years active: 1976–present
- Labels: EMI; Bronze; Killerwatt; Metal Blade; Rise Above; Crook'd
- Members: Kevin Heybourne; Will Palmer; Jimmy Martin; Fredrik Jansson
- Past members: Steve Coleman; Rob Downing; Barry Clements; Steve Jones; Kevin Riddles; Dave Hogg; Dave Dufort; Ricky Bruce; Jerry Cunningham; Roger Marsden; Peter Gordelier; Dave Tattum; Spencer Hollman; Jon Torres; Grant Dennison; Tom Hunting; Doug Piercy; Lee Altus; Darren Minter; Chris Fullard; Myk Taylor; Richie Wicks; Scott Highham; Keith Herzberg; Andrew Prestidge; Bill Steer; Tom Draper
- Website: Angel Witch on Facebook

Angel Witch are a British heavy metal band which formed in London in 1976, recognised as one of the pioneering groups of the new wave of British heavy metal (NWOBHM).

Originally established as Lucifer by guitarist and vocalist Kevin Heybourne, the band evolved through various line-ups before settling on the name Angel Witch in 1978, with Heybourne as the constant driving force. Their self-titled debut album, Angel Witch, released in 1980 by Bronze Records, is widely regarded as a seminal work in the NWOBHM genre, featuring the standout track of the same name, which gained significant airplay on BBC Radio 1's Friday Rock Show.

Despite critical acclaim, the band faced challenges with management and record label issues, leading to their initial disbandment in 1982. Angel Witch reformed in 1984 and have since experienced multiple hiatuses and line-up changes, with Heybourne leading the group through periods of renewed activity, including headline performances at festivals such as Bloodstock Open Air in 2009 and the release of their fifth studio album, Angel of Light, in 2019 via Metal Blade Records.

Mark Deming of AllMusic stated: "Like most of their peers, Angel Witch combined the basic lessons of Black Sabbath with the energy and speed of Motörhead." Known for their dark, melodic sound and occult-themed lyrics, Angel Witch remain a respected name in heavy metal circles. They have been acknowledged as an influence by many bands of the then-emerging thrash, speed, doom and extreme metal genres.

== Biography ==
=== Formation ===
The band formed, originally under the name of Lucifer, with guitarist and vocalist Kevin Heybourne, guitarist Rob Downing, drummer Steve Jones, and bassist Barry Clements. Lucifer split and Jones joined Bruce Dickinson to form Speed. The remnants of Lucifer became Angel Witch, with the exceptions of Clements, who was replaced by Kevin Riddles, and Jones, who was replaced by Steve Coleman. The following year Downing left the band.

=== Limited chart success, brief record deal ===
Angel Witch's first song to achieve mainstream popularity was "Baphomet", which was included on a compilation titled Metal for Muthas. This song drew a fair amount of attention to the band, and they signed a recording deal with EMI. However, the deal was cancelled, due to manager Ken Heybourne refusing to hand Angel Witch over to professional management, and the poor performance of their first single released under the EMI label in 1980. Entitled "Sweet Danger", it lasted a single week on the UK Singles Chart. This was their only UK chart listing and despite being quite an achievement for a NWOBHM group, spending a single week at No. 75 (the lowest position in the charts) meant they were listed as the "least successful chart act of all time" in the Guinness Book of Hit Records. This same feat was repeated by fellow NWOBHM group Grand Prix with their Keep on Believing 7" in 1983.

=== Debut album ===
In 1980, Bronze Records picked up the band and they recorded and released their debut album, self-titled Angel Witch.

=== Break-ups and reunions ===
Subsequent to the album's release, the band fell apart. Dave Hogg was fired, and Kevin Riddles left the band to form Tytan. Despite Heybourne's attempts to continue Angel Witch with other musicians, the end of the band was declared and he joined Deep Machine.

Angel Witch returned to activity in 1982, when Heybourne and two musicians from Deep Machine - namely vocalist Roger Marsden and drummer Ricky Bruce - left to assemble a new Angel Witch line-up together with bassist Jerry Cunningham. This line-up lasted a very short time, as Marsden's voice did not fit the style of the band very well. He was fired from the band and Heybourne assumed the vocals once more.

By 1983, the band had ceased its activities, and Heybourne moved to Blind Fury. In 1984, Angel Witch was once more brought to life, this time with the help of bassist Peter Gordelier (ex-Marquis De Sade), singer Dave Tattum and with Dave Hogg returning to the drums. This line-up recorded the album Screamin' N' Bleedin'. Dave Hogg was sacked again. He was replaced by Spencer Hollman. With the new drummer they recorded Frontal Assault, which deviated heavily from Angel Witch's previous albums, having many melodic elements.

Dave Tattum was released the same year and for a few years Angel Witch played as a trio on sporadic live performances. In 1989, they recorded a live album, entitled simply Live.

=== Creation of American group ===
Heybourne decided that it was in the band's best interest to move to the United States, but the other members had no way of accomplishing that, having stable lives in their home country. Thus, an American incarnation of Angel Witch was born. It was composed of Heybourne, bassist Jon Torres (Lȧȧz Rockit, Ulysses Siren), drummer Tom Hunting (Exodus) and guitarist Doug Piercy (Heathen, Anvil Chorus). This line-up functioned quite well, and soon the band had booked a fair number of shows throughout the US. However, Heybourne had some pending issues regarding immigration, and he was arrested one day before the first concert of the band. Without Heybourne, Angel Witch was dissolved.

=== New lineup in the 2000s and 2010s ===
After the release of the Resurrection compilation album in 2000, the band intended to play together once more, but after a series of internal conflicts, Heybourne assembled another line-up, with new members. They were on the bill for the traditional Orange Goblin Christmas show at The Camden Underworld, London, on 20 December 2008. In 2009, their eponymous song "Angel Witch" was featured on the soundtrack of the action-adventure videogame, Brütal Legend.

In 2011, Angel Witch entered the studio to record their fourth studio album, entitled As Above, So Below, with Kevin Heybourne on guitar and vocals, Will Palmer on bass guitar and Andrew Prestidge on drums. They also returned to playing live, with Bill Steer on guitar, for second stage headline slot at Bloodstock Open Air in 2011.

One-time Angel Witch bassist Jon Torres died on 3 September 2013 of a reported heart failure. He was 51 years old.

The band toured and played festivals in 2015 and 2018.

On 30 August 2019, the band released a new single, "Don't Turn Your Back" which debuted at number 17 on the Kerrang! Rock Chart before rising to 14 in its second and final week.

The band supported King Diamond on tour in Europe during the spring and summer of 2025, along with Paradise Lost and Unto Others. On 4 July 2025, original keyboardist and bassist Kevin Riddles died from cancer at the age of 68.

== Legacy ==
Mark Deming of AllMusic spoke of the band's impact on heavy metal: "In 1979, Angel Witch were one of the most promising bands of the New Wave of British Heavy Metal, with a hardcore following and a modestly successful single under their belts. But like many fine bands of that movement, bad luck, bad management, and misunderstanding record companies forced them into early retirement."

Angel Witch have been cited as an influence by many notable metal bands, including Metallica, Venom, Slayer, Anthrax, Testament, Celtic Frost, Death, Candlemass and Megadeth, the latter of whose lead singer Dave Mustaine graced the February 2010 cover of Decibel magazine wearing an Angel Witch shirt. Bands that have covered Angel Witch songs in concert or on record include Trouble ("Confused" live), Six Feet Under ("Confused" on Graveyard Classics), Blood Curse ("Angel Witch" on their debut album Sorceress), Onslaught ("Confused" on In Search of Sanity), Skull Fist ("Angel Witch" live), Battle Ram ("Angel Witch" on the Smash the Gates EP), S.A. Slayer ("Dr. Phibes" & "Angel Witch" live), Exodus ("Angel of Death" on Blood In, Blood Out as bonus track) and Amazing Maze, which is a one off album by Italian Power Metal band Labyrinth under a different name ("Angel Witch").

In 2007, German label Unbroken Records issued a Tribute to Angel Witch compilation album featuring 15 underground metal acts covering songs from the band's early singles and first three full-length releases.

== Members ==
Current members

- Kevin Heybourne – lead guitar, lead vocals (1976–1981, 1982–1983, 1984–1990, 1997–1998, 2000–2001, 2002–2003, 2008–present)
- Will Palmer – bass (2008–present)
- Jimmy Martin – rhythm guitar, backing vocals (2015–present)
- Fredrik Jansson – drums (2016–present)

== Discography ==
=== Studio albums ===
- Angel Witch (1980)
- Screamin' 'n' Bleedin' (1985)
- Frontal Assault (1986)
- As Above, So Below (2012)
- Angel of Light (2019)

=== Live albums ===
- Angel Witch Live (1990)
- 2000: Live at the LA2 (2000)
- Angel of Death: Live at East Anglia Rock Festival (2006)
- Burn the White Witch - Live in London (2009)

=== Compilations ===
- Metal for Muthas (1980)
- Doctor Phibes (1986)
- Screamin' Assault (1988)
- Resurrection (1998)
- Sinister History (1999)

=== Extended plays and singles ===
- "Sweet Danger" (single) (1980)
- Sweet Danger (EP) (1980)
- "Angel Witch" (single) (1980)
- "Loser" (single) (1981)
- "Goodbye" (single) (1985)
- They Wouldn't Dare (EP) (2004)
- "Don't Turn Your Back" (single) (2019)

== See also ==
- List of new wave of British heavy metal bands
