= VI (Onslaught album) =

Studio album by Onslaught
- Released: 20 September 2013
- Recorded: April–May 2013
- Studio: MWNCI Studios, Carmarthenshire, Wales
- Genre: Thrash metal
- Length: 39:26
- Label: AFM
- Producer: Onslaught

Onslaught chronology
Sounds of Violence (2011)	VI (2013)	Generation Antichrist (2020)

Professional ratings
Review scores
Source	Rating
Jukebox:Metal	4.5/5 stars
Metal Forces	7/10 stars

VI is the sixth studio album by English thrash metal band Onslaught, released on 20 September 2013. It was their second album to have bassist Jeff Williams, third in a row to have vocalist Sy Keeler (though he would leave Onslaught once again in 2020 and rejoin a second time in 2025), and only to feature drummer Michael Hourihan.

== Track listing ==
All lyrics are written by Nige Rockett/Regina Mitchell; all music is composed by Nige Rockett and Andy Rosser-Davies.

No.	Title	Length
1.	"A New World Order" (intro)	0:36
2.	"Chaos Is King"	4:05
3.	"Fuel for My Fire"	5:05
4.	"Children of the Sand"	6:05
5.	"Slaughterize"	4:01
6.	"66'Fucking'6"	5:11
7.	"Cruci-Fiction"	5:08
8.	"Dead Man Walking"	4:06
9.	"Enemy of My Enemy"	5:09
Total length:		39:26

== Digipak Bonus Track ==
No.	Title	Length
10.	"Shellshock (2013 re-recording)"	6:37

== Personnel ==
=== Onslaught ===
- Sy Keeler – vocals
- Nige Rockett – guitar
- Andy Rosser-Davies – guitar
- Jeff Williams – bass
- Michael Hourihan – drums

=== Additional musicians ===
- Singo Otani, Leigh Chambers – guitar solos
- United – backing vocals
- Julian Gobz Hill – samples
- Sebastian Freit – strings on "Children of the Sand"

=== Production ===
- Gethin Woolcock, Charlie Creese – engineers
- Thomas Johansson – mixing, mastering
