= Abyss (Lionsheart album) =

Studio album by Lionsheart
- Released: 15 June 2004
- Recorded: May–June 2003 at Warehouse Studios in Oxford, United Kingdom
- Genre: Heavy metal
- Length: 49:43
- Label: Metaledge Records
- Producers: Lionsheart, Peter Head

Abyss is the fourth album by British heavy metal band Lionsheart, released by Metaledge Records on 24 June 2004.

It was the last Lionsheart album to feature Steve Grimmet on vocals.

== Reception ==
Professional ratings
Review scores
Source	Rating
Revelation Z	link
Blabbermouth	6/10 stars
Q magazine	5/5 stars

Abyss is often hailed by fans as the rebirth of Lionsheart being their first studio album since 1998's Under Fire. The album received good reviews garnering a 6.5 out of 10 from the All Music Guide and the same from Roadrunner Records Blabbermouth.net.

== Reviews ==
Comparisons can be made to Sabbath, Iron Maiden, and Dio to give you an idea of what page this is from. Pretty much pure rockin' metal with no frills.

— Revelation Z

An emotional experience, this album is the total opposite of Lionsheart's earlier, lighter efforts, this album is heavier, more aggressive, much more diverse, and infinitely more thought provoking, whatever the reason Steve Grimmet had for disappearing, I'm just glad he's back, and with a kick-ass metal album to boot.

— Alternative Zine

== Track listing ==
No.	Title	Writer(s)	Length
1.	"Screaming"	Grimmett, Nash	3:59
2.	"Nightmare"	Grimmett, Nash	3:55
3.	"All I Got"	Grimmett, Nash	4:13
4.	"I Need Love"	Grimmett, Nash	4:32
5.	"How Can I Tell You"	Grimmett, Nash	4:16
6.	"I'm Alive"	Grimmett, Nash	4:44
7.	"Don't Waste My Time"	Grimmett, Nash	3:12
8.	"If You Cut Me"	Grimmett, Nash	4:02
9.	"Save Me"	Grimmett, Nash	4:06
10.	"Witchcraft"	Grimmett, Nash	4:01
11.	"How Long"	Grimmett, Nash	4:27
12.	"Abyss"	Grimmett, Nash	4:59

== Personnel ==
Lionsheart

- Steve Grimmett — Lead vocals
- Ian Nash — Guitars
- Steve Hales — Drums, background vocals
- Eddie Marsh — Bass
