= Killing Peace =

Studio album by Onslaught
- Released: 5 March 2007
- Recorded: 2006, Backstage Studios (Derby, UK)
- Genre: Thrash metal
- Length: 44:07
- Label: Candlelight
- Producer: Andy Sneap

Onslaught chronology
| In Search of Sanity (1989) | Killing Peace (2007) | Sounds of Violence (2011) |

Professional ratings
Review scores
| Source | Rating |
|---|---|
| AllMusic | 4/5 stars |
| Blabbermouth.net | 6/10 stars |

Killing Peace is the fourth studio album by English thrash metal band Onslaught, released in 2007. It was their first album since 1989's In Search of Sanity and the first to feature Sy Keeler since 1986's The Force.

== Critical reception ==
Reception to Onslaught was fairly similar, with generally positive receptions noting that the album bought nothing new to the genre while being a great hit hearkening back to thrash rock of the 1980s.

Exclaim! was positive to the cheesy lyrics combined with traditional thrash music, saying that it avoided the common failures of reinventing the genre and instead stood as a "a salute to the long-gone days of 80's thrash".

While AllMusic again noted there was nothing groundbreaking, there was enthusiasm for their performance "the material is excellent, the performances inspired, crisp and undeniably focused" and a good comeback springboard to their earlier albums.

Blabbermouth.net was more negative, rating them as a 2nd-tier album between the big names and niche outfits, complaining both about the lack of originality but the monotonous nature in the latter half of the album. They also gave positives, stating that purists would be massive fans, with high quality solos and occasional moments of brilliance.

== Track listing ==
| No. | Title | Length |
|---|---|---|
| 1. | "Burn" | 4:51 |
| 2. | "Killing Peace" | 3:37 |
| 3. | "Destroyer of Worlds" | 5:55 |
| 4. | "Pain" | 4:08 |
| 5. | "Prayer for the Dead" | 5:39 |
| 6. | "Tested to Destruction" | 4:44 |
| 7. | "Twisted Jesus" | 6:16 |
| 8. | "Planting Seeds of Hate" | 5:00 |
| 9. | "Shock 'n' Awe" | 3:57 |
| Total length: | | 44:07 |

Japanese edition bonus track
| No. | Title | Length |
|---|---|---|
| 1. | "Power from Hell" (Re-recorded Version) | 5:05 |
| Total length: | | 49:12 |

Note

- The bonus track "Power from Hell" is a Japanese only exclusive, with lyrics in the booklet written in English, additional inner with lyrics and information in Japanese and OBI strip

== Personnel ==
- Sy Keeler – vocals
- Alan Jordan – guitar
- Nige Rockett – guitar
- James Hinder – bass
- Steve Grice – drums
