= Songs of Muerto County Revisited =

Songs of Muerto County Revisited is a two-CD version of Puerto Muerto's 'lost' soundtrack to the classic cult horror flick The Texas Chain Saw Massacre, released on 20 Nov 2006. It was originally a limited edition to coincide with their tour of US colleges and theaters with the original "Leatherface". Its success has spread to Europe.

The band also appear alongside Calexico, Bright Eyes, Sparklehorse, Johnny Cash, and Gram Parsons on the venue's best-of Strange Country compilation album. The Introduction to Puerto Muerto bonus disc includes tracks from their first three albums, as well as B-sides and outtakes, including their cover of the Kinks' "Alcohol".

== Track list ==
=== CD 1 ===
1. "Muerto County"
2. "Ghostee"
3. "Yeah"
4. "Josephine"
5. "Walking"
6. "What Have I Done"
7. "Apple Pie"
8. "Road Song"
9. "Wondering"
10. "Cherries"
11. "Black Maria"
12. "Goodbye"

=== CD 2 ===
1. "San Pedro"
2. "Blood Red Wine"
3. "Chapayev's Machine Gunners"
4. "Tennessee"
5. "Stars"
6. "Boy"
7. "Father's Treasure Remix"
8. "Alcohol"
9. "Jean Lafitte (acoustic)"
