= Grim Reaper (band) =

British heavy metal band

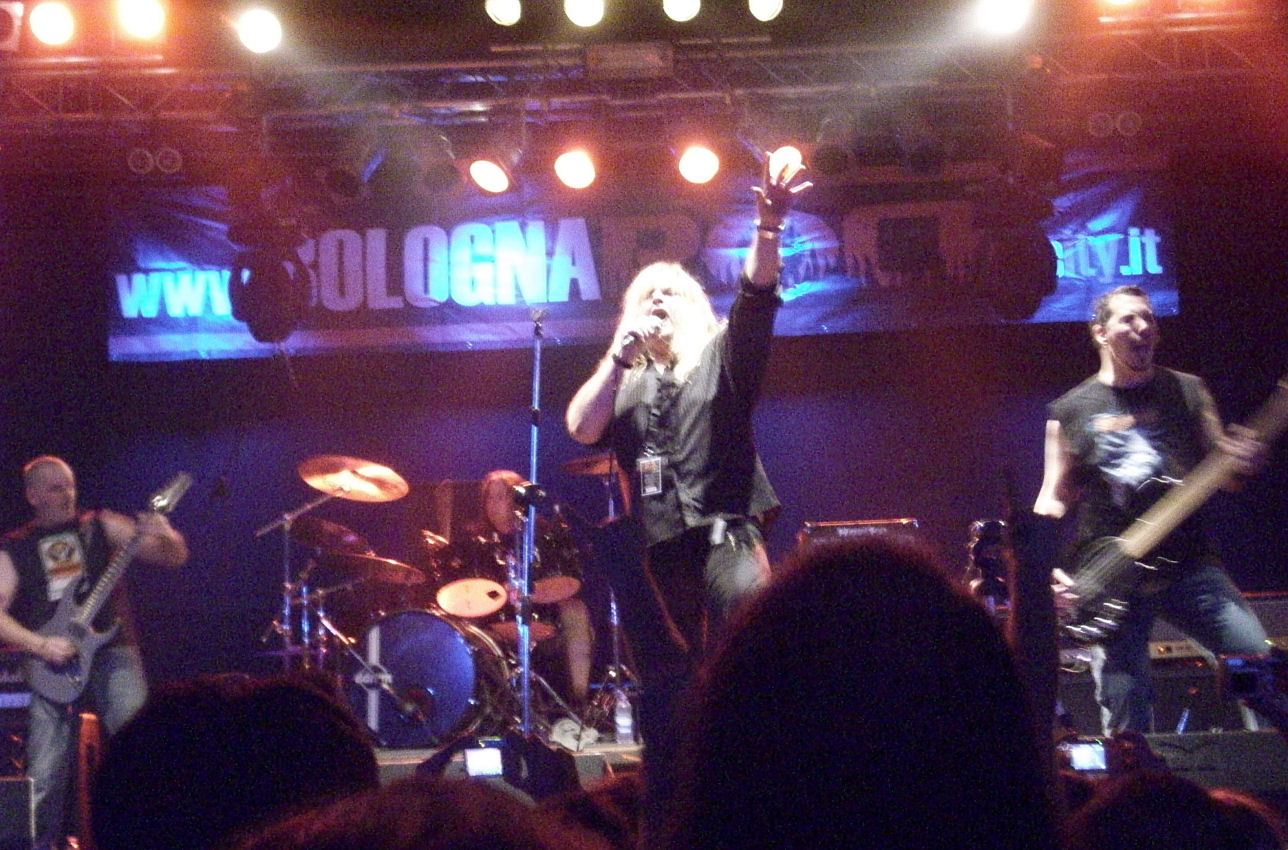
- Grim Reaper live 2010

Background information
- Also known as: Steve Grimmett's Grim Reaper
- Origin: Droitwich Spa, England
- Genres: Heavy metal
- Years active: 1979–1988; 2006–2022
- Labels: RCA; Ebony Records
- Past members: Nick Bowcott; Dave Wanklin; Lee Harris; Kevin Neale; Adrian Jacques; Steve Grimmett; Paul DeMercado; Pete Newdeck; Ritchie Walker; Chaz Grimaldi; Ian Nash; Julian Hill; Steve Grice Philip Matthews
- Website: grimreaperofficial.co.uk

Grim Reaper were a British heavy metal band from the new wave of British heavy metal era. The band was formed in 1979 in Droitwich, Worcestershire, by guitarist Nick Bowcott. There were numerous lineup changes over the years, with frontman Steve Grimmett being the longest running member, from 1982 to 1988, then 2006 until his death in 2022. They are best known for several of their 1980s songs, including the respective title tracks from their first three albums: See You in Hell (1983), Fear No Evil (1985) and Rock You to Hell (1987); each of those songs gained notoriety in the 1990s for appearing on Beavis and Butt-Head. After disbanding in 1988, the band reformed in 2006 around Grimmett, but due to legal issues surrounding the rights to the original band name, they went by Steve Grimmett's Grim Reaper. Two albums under that name – Walking in the Shadows (2016) and At the Gates (2019) – were released before Grimmett died in 2022, after which the band disbanded once again.

== History ==
=== Early years (1979–1983) ===
The band formed in Worcestershire and initially featured Paul de Mercado on vocals. Their first album demo tape was called Bleed 'Em Dry and had an album's worth of material. After developing a following in the northwest and Yorkshire they caught the attention of Heavy Metal Records, who added a re-recorded version of The Reaper to their 1981 compilation Heavy Metal Heroes from the demo. A positive write-up in the Kerrang! 'Armed & Ready' section preceded a breakup of the initial lineup, with only Nick Bowcott remaining. He recruited Dave Wanklin on bass, Lee Harris on Drums, and most importantly, Steve Grimmett on vocals. This lineup won a 1982 Battle of the Bands competition featuring over 100 bands, winning studio time to demo new material. Grimmett was then the unofficial vocalist for Cheltenham's Chateaux, who were signed to Darryl Johnston's Ebony Records label, so he handed them the Grim Reaper demo tape, and the band was signed. Their debut album was See You in Hell. The album was released in 1983 and was distributed worldwide through RCA Records.

=== Commercial success, legal battles and breakup (1985–1988) ===
Grim Reaper soon became readily identifiable with Bowcott's guitar work and lead vocalist Steve Grimmett's head voice vocals. Their successful world tour included a support show at Texxas Jam playing to over 20,000 people. Their 1985 follow-up, Fear No Evil, showed improvement on the production front and also enjoyed moderate success in both the United States and Europe.

Legal battles with Ebony Records delayed the release of the band's third album Rock You to Hell by almost two years. The album was released directly through RCA Records in 1987. However, by this time Grim Reaper's melodic heavy metal sound had fallen out of favor as much of the metal market moved toward heavier fare like thrash metal and speed metal. Even the major label distribution and popular video for the title track could not save the band. With the production of their fourth studio album (reportedly to be called Nothing Whatsoever to Do with Hell) about to start, another round of legal action from Ebony Records effectively dealt the death blow to Grim Reaper, subsequently disbanding in 1988.

=== Side projects (1988–2006) ===
Grimmett went on to front Onslaught and Lionsheart, as well as perform on several tribute albums. Bowcott became a freelance music writer, and later staff contributor, for publications like Circus and Guitar World. Bowcott also worked with Marshall Amplification's United States division. He also played in the band Barfly who recorded an album with Jack Ponti producing and Michael Wagener mixing for RCA records.

=== Reunion and death of Grimmett (2006–2022) ===
In 2006, Eddie Trunk announced on Metal Mania that the band had reformed. The "original" lineup of Grim Reaper (without Nick Bowcott) played the Keep It True VI festival in Lauda-Königshofen on 8 April 2006. The band played the annual MetalBrew festival in London's Mill Hill on Saturday 18 July 2009. Later they were scheduled to play at the Play it Loud IV in Bologna, Italy, in September 2009. The festival was then cancelled when the promoter forfeited, but the band (urged on by a crowd of fans who had already bought tickets) managed to play the date along with several originally billed acts (as a single-day event instead of a weekend-spanning one).

The band made a successful appearance at the British Steel festival in Bologna, Italy in November 2010 at the Estragon venue on a bill that included other classic bands of the NWoBHM era – Diamond Head, Girlschool, Demon, and Angelwitch. They also played at the Academy Birmingham with the band Jameson Raid.

The then-current line-up continued to tour the UK and Europe. They did a short tour of Greece and Cyprus in November 2011 and released the Limited Edition "Live in Europe 2011". Festival appearances in 2012 included Sweden's "Muskelrock" and headlining Germany's Sword Brothers. More European Festivals and US tours followed in the coming years. In 2013, they were co-headliners of Belgium's Heavy Sound Festival in November with Tokyo Blade.

In April 2014, Grim Reaper played their first show in the US since 1987, joined by original guitarist Nick Bowcott, and featured several tracks from the forthcoming album, From Hell.

In 2016, Steve Grimmett's Grim Reaper released a new studio album, their first since 1987.

On 17 January 2017 Grimmett was hospitalised following a show at Piedrahits & Pedro Moncayo in Guayaquil, Ecuador. Surgery followed, which was unsuccessful in defeating an infection in his right leg, so a portion of this leg was amputated on 18 January 2017. The band continued to play, and played an emotional headlining set at Hard Rock Hell's NWOBHM Christmas gig in Sheffield in December that year.

On 25 July 2019, it was announced that Grim Reaper would be releasing an album of all-new material. The album titled At The Gates was released on 11 October 2019 with a special album launch show to follow the next night, 12 October, at London's Boston Music Rooms.

As of January 2022, according to Grimmett, a new album from Grim Reaper was in the works. Meanwhile, in March, the band released its first live album, Reaping the Whirlwind.

On 15 August 2022, Grimmett died at the age of 62.

== Musical style ==
Since achieving mainstream success, Grim Reaper has been known for "embodying every single aspect of cheese in heavy metal" and "going over the top with poppy hooks and edgy lyrics."

== In popular culture ==
- A slightly re-edited version of the video for Grim Reaper's 1985 hit "Fear No Evil" was initially used as the video for Weezer's song "We Are All on Drugs".
- "See You in Hell", "Fear No Evil" and "Rock You to Hell" all appeared in episodes of Beavis and Butt-Head, with the duo mocking the songs and videos.
- Grim Reaper's song "Lust for Freedom" was used as the title track for a 1987 women's prison movie of the same name.

== Members ==
Final lineup

- Steve Grimmett — lead vocals (1982–1988, 2006–2022; until his death)
- Ian Nash — guitar, backing vocals (2006–2015, 2016, 2016–2022)
- Julian Hill — bass, backing vocals (2018–2022)
- Mark Pullin — drums (2018–2022)

Former members

- Nick Bowcott — guitar, backing vocals (1979–1981, 1982–1988)
- Paul De Mercado — lead vocals (1979–1981)
- Kevin Neale — bass (1979)
- Lee Harris — drums (1979, 1982–1985)
- Adrian "Angel" Jacques — drums (1979–1981)
- Dave "Chief" Wanklin — bass (1979–1981, 1982–1987)
- Phil Matthews — bass (1981)
- Brian Parry — drums (1981)
- Mark Simon — drums, backing vocals (1985–1988)
- Geoff Curtis — bass, backing vocals (1987–1988)
- Benje Brittan — bass, backing vocals (1988)
- Ritchie Walker — bass, backing vocals (2006–2010)
- Pete Newdeck — drums (2006–2010)
- Chaz Grimaldi — bass, backing vocals (2010–2016)
- Mark Rumble — drums (2010–2014)
- Paul "Needles" White — drums (2014–2018)
- Richie Yeates — guitar, backing vocals (2015–2016)
- Martin Trail — bass, backing vocals (2016–2018)
- Steve Stine — guitar, backing vocals (2016)

== Discography ==
=== Studio albums ===
- See You in Hell (1983)
- Fear No Evil (1985)
- Rock You to Hell (1987)
- Walking in the Shadows (2016)
- At the Gates (2019)

=== Single ===
- "The Show Must Go On" (single edit) b/w "Dead On Arrival" (1984)

=== Compilation albums ===
- Heavy Metal Heroes (1981) with the song "The Reaper" and in an earlier line-up including Paul DeMacardo (vocals), Nick Bowcott (guitar), Adrian Jacques (drums And Bass).
- See You in Hell/Fear No Evil (1999)
- Best of Grim Reaper (1999)

=== Live albums ===
- Reaping the Whirlwind (2022)

== See also ==
- List of new wave of British heavy metal bands
