= The Force (Onslaught album) =

Studio album by Onslaught
- Released: March 1986
- Recorded: January–February 1986
- Studios: Matrix Studios, London
- Genre: Thrash metal
- Length: 44:48
- Label: Under One Flag
- Producers: Onslaught, Dave Pine

Onslaught chronology
Power from Hell (1985)	The Force (1986)	In Search of Sanity (1989)

Professional ratings
Review scores
Source	Rating
AllMusic	3/5 stars
Martin Popoff	5/10 stars

The Force is the second studio album by English thrash metal band Onslaught, released in March 1986, through Under One Flag.

More successful than their previous album, Power from Hell, The Force is considered a thrash metal classic by fans and critics, and the band's first to feature Sy Keeler on vocals (he would depart in 1988, only to return for the 2007 album Killing Peace).

The album was re-issued in 2002 by Blackend Records and received a full remaster by Jacob Hansen for the 2013 release on AFM Records, with revamped artwork with liner notes by Nige Rockett. Onslaught have been playing The Force in its entirety recently celebrating its anniversary on The Full Force Tour.

== Music ==
The album's music has drawn comparisons to Slayer, "albeit with murkier, lower-budget production," according to Steve Huey of AllMusic. The musicianship is considered to be improved from the group's previous effort.

== Track listing ==
All songs written by Onslaught.

Side A
No.	Title	Length
1.	"Let There Be Death"	6:41
2.	"Metal Forces"	6:37
3.	"Fight with the Beast"	6:01

Side B
No.	Title	Length
4.	"Demoniac"	6:49
5.	"Flame of the Antichrist"	7:49
6.	"Contract in Blood"	6:11
7.	"Thrash 'till the Death"	4:40
Total length:		44:48

1993 Japanese bonus tracks
No.	Title	Length
8.	"Let There Be Rock" (AC/DC cover)	5:14
9.	"Metal Forces" (Live)	6:30
10.	"Power from Hell / Angels of Death" (Live)	4:28
Total length:		61:00

30th anniversary bonus tracks
No.	Title	Length
11.	"Let There Be Death" (Live)	4:16
12.	"Metal Forces" (Live)	5:06
13.	"Fight with the Beast" (Live)	5:24
14.	"Demoniac" (Live)	5:12
Total length:		80:58

== Personnel ==
Onslaught

- Sy Keeler – vocals
- Nige Rockett – lead guitar
- Jase Stallard – rhythm guitar
- Paul Mahoney – bass
- Steve Grice – drums

Production

- Dave Pine – producer, engineer
- Roy Rowland – mixing
