= In Search of Sanity =

Studio album by Onslaught
- Released: 24 April 1989: 30 October 2006 (reissue) 24 April 2025 (2nd disc)
- Recorded: July (track 3)/December 1988, 1989 (tracks 10–17)
- Studios: Westside (track 3), Eden and Smokehouse Studios, London
- Genre: Thrash metal
- Length: 57:17: 59:15 (CD reissue) 157:59 (2016 2nd disc)
- Label: London: Blackend (CD reissue)
- Producer: Stephan Galfas

Onslaught chronology
The Force (1986)	In Search of Sanity (1989)	Killing Peace (2007)

Singles from In Search of Sanity
- 1. "Shellshock" Released: November 1988; 2. "Let There Be Rock" Released: 8 May 1989; 3. "Welcome to Dying" Released: 17 July 1989

Professional ratings
Review scores
Source	Rating
AllMusic	1.5/5 stars
Hi-Fi News & Record Review	A:2
Martin Popoff	7/10 stars

In Search of Sanity is the third studio album by English thrash metal band Onslaught, released on 24 April 1989 through London Records.

This album was originally recorded with Sy Keeler, but London Records were not impressed with the final product from a commercial point of view and enforced a re-mix and a complete re-recording of the vocals by Grim Reaper frontman Steve Grimmett, being the only album featuring him. It features their two longest songs to date, "Blood Upon the Ice" and "Welcome to Dying".

While the album was mostly in the same thrash/speed metal vein as The Force, it contains a more polished sound than Onslaught's previous albums, acquiring a more progressive and melodic edge.

Despite meeting mixed reviews by their fans, In Search of Sanity was moderately successful, peaking at number 46 on the UK charts while the single "Let There Be Rock" peaked at number 50 in that country.

It was also Onslaught's last album before disbanding in 1991, only to reform in 2004 and the release of their fourth album Killing Peace in 2007.

== Track listing ==
Liner notes adapted from the original LP.

Side A
No.	Title	Writer(s)	Length
1.	"Asylum" (Instrumental)		5:16
2.	"In Search of Sanity"	Nige Rockett, Rob Trottman, James Hinder	7:32
3.	"Shellshock"	Rockett, Trottman, Hinder	6:54
4.	"Lightning War"	Rockett	7:03
5.	"Let There Be Rock" (AC/DC cover)	Angus Young, Malcolm Young, Bon Scott	4:06

Side B
No.	Title	Writer(s)	Length
6.	"Blood Upon the Ice"	Rockett	8:31
7.	"Welcome to Dying"	Rockett, Trottman, Hinder	12:45
8.	"Power Play"	Rockett, Trottman, Hinder	6:30
Total length:			57:17

CD bonus track
No.	Title	Writer(s)	Length
9.	"Confused" (Angel Witch cover)	Kevin Heybourne	1:58
Total length:			59:15

2nd disc of a recorded live concert at the Bristol Hippodrome in 1989.
No.	Title	Writer(s)	Length
10.	"In Search of Sanity" (Instrumental)		5:16
11.	"Shellshock"	Nige Rockett, Rob Trottman, James Hinder	7:32
12.	"Fight with the Beast"	Rockett, Trottman, Hinder	6:54
13.	"Blood upon the Ice"	Rockett	8:31
14.	"Metal Forces"	Rockett	6:37
15.	"Lightning War"	Rockett	7:03
16.	"Welcome to Dying"	Rockett, Trottman, Hinder	12:45
17.	"Let There Be Rock" (AC/DC cover)	Angus Young, Malcolm Young, Bon Scott	4:06
Total length:			157:59

== Personnel ==
Liner notes adapted from the original LP.

Onslaught is

- Steve Grimmett – vocals
- Nige Rockett – guitar
- Rob Trottman – guitar
- James Hinder – bass, backing vocals (except tracks 10–17)
- Steve Grice – drums, backing vocals (except tracks 10–17)

Additional musicians

- Jody Gray, Dave Taggart, Phil Caffrey, Masaki Yamada, Stephan Galfas – backing vocals (except tracks 10–17)
- Steve Laws-Clifford – keyboards (except tracks 10–17)

Production

- Stephan Galfas – producer, engineer, mixing
- Paul Mortimor, Richard Barraclough, Jean Baptiste Liere – engineers
- Noah "T.T." Baron – mixing
- Mixed at Atlantic Studios, New York City, NY in December 1988/January 1989
