= Deep Machine =

British heavy metal band

- Origin: East London, England
- Genres: Heavy metal
- Label: High Roller Records

Deep Machine were an English heavy metal band from the East London, England, that first came into existence in 1979. Founded by lead guitarist Bob Hooker, the band's music was influenced by other NWOBHM bands such as Iron Maiden and in particular Judas Priest.

== History ==
Various early line-ups existed but eventually Hooker recruited John Wiggins on guitar, Dave Orton bass, Rick Bruce drums, and Roger Marsden vocals. This line-up recorded some now much sought-after demo tapes including songs such as "Demon Preacher", "Asylum", "Witchild" and "Deep Machine". Dave Orton then left and was replaced by Andy Wrighton on bass. Despite developing somewhat of a cult following, and having an impressive reputation for their energetic live performances, Deep Machine were unable to secure a record deal. Eventually Bob Hooker left the band in 1981 and was replaced by Angel Witch guitarist and vocalist Kevin Heybourne. This line-up proved unstable with Heybourne, Marsden and Bruce parting company with the others to form a new line-up of Angel Witch. Marsden later went on to join the E.F. Band. In 1981, guitarist Tony Harris of the new Deep Machine line-up, joined another band, Destroya, on stage as guest in London's Marquee Club at a one-off gig featuring singer Andy Diamond, bassist Brian Genocide, guitarist Terry Lewis and hard hitting drummer Kevin Marx. The band supported Lone Wolf fronted by ex Iron Maiden singer Paul Di'Anno. Deep Machine drummer Steve Kingsley went on to join Rogue Male, and Andy Wrighton teamed up once again with John Wiggins. At this point another NWOBHM band, Gandalf Wizardry, split after two years on the same circuit and Andy Wrighton and John Wiggins approached Wizardry vocalist Andy M F Mawbey in an attempt to revive Deep Machine again, but this lasted only a couple of months until Wiggins announced his departure to join what was later to become Tokyo Blade. Aidan Fitzpatrick (ex Wizardry guitarist) came in for the recently departed Wiggins and auditions began to find a second guitarist to make up a five-piece. This phase in Deep Machine history never left the rehearsal studios and finally ended when Andy Wrighton left to join Wiggins in Tokyo Blade.

In 2009, Hooker, Wiggins, Marsden and Wrighton decided to play together for the first time in almost 30 years, together with Slam drummer Chas Towler. This eventually gave rise to a new line-up of Deep Machine, including Hooker and Towler with Lenny Baxter (vocals), John Riley (bass) and Nigel Martindale (guitar) which started to gig in 2010. In February 2012, Martindale was officially replaced by guitarist Nick ‘The Beast’ East. Deep Machine released their first album Rise of the Machine on 25 April 2014, which was received with overwhelming enthusiasm by Die Hard Machine fans in the UK and Europe. In October 2014, Deep Machine regretfully announced the departure of vocalist Lenny Baxter after four successful years with the band. However, shortly after his departure, Deep Machine announced that Andy M F Mawbey was to replace him as lead vocalist. Mawbey's first live gig with Deep Machine came 32 years after he first auditioned in 1982. John Riley then quit and Chas Towler was let go.

The band continued on into 2015, recruiting ex-Kaine members Dan Mailer on bass guitar and Josh Moreton on drums, before officially calling it quits in October that year.

== Discography ==
- Rise of the Machine (2014)
