= As Above, So Below (Angel Witch album) =

Studio album by Angel Witch
- Released: March 12, 2012
- Studio: Orgone Studios, London, England
- Genre: Heavy metal
- Length: 50:28
- Label: Metal Blade
- Producer: Jaime Gomez Arellano

Angel Witch chronology
Resurrection (1998)	As Above, So Below (2012)	Angel of Light (2019)

Professional ratings
Review scores
Source	Rating
AllMusic	3/5 stars

As Above, So Below was the fourth studio album by British heavy metal band Angel Witch, published in 2012. It was their first studio album in 26 years, produced by Ghost producer Jaime Gomez Arellano.

== Track listing ==
All songs written by Kevin Heybourne.

No.	Title	Length
1.	"Dead Sea Scrolls"	5:59
2.	"Into the Dark"	5:11
3.	"Geburah"	5:24
4.	"The Horla"	7:29
5.	"Witching Hour"	5:49
6.	"Upon This Cord"	6:33
7.	"Guillotine"	6:53
8.	"Brainwashed"	7:10
9.	"Devil's Tower" (Japan release)	5:25
Total length:		50:28

== Personnel ==
- Kevin Heybourne - guitars, vocals
- Will Palmer - bass
- Andy Prestridge - drums
