= Dave Dufort =

British rock drummer

Dave Dufort (du’Fort)
- Also known as: Hermien Jerian-du'Fort (Hermien JD)
- Genres: Heavy Metal, rock
- Instrument(s): Drums, electronic keyboards
- Years active: 1966–present

Dave du’Fort (also known as Hermien JD) is a British rock drummer who has played with Ian Hunter, Kevin Ayers, Mike Oldfield and Screaming Lord Sutch, and was a member of the new wave of British heavy metal bands E. F. Band, Angel Witch and Tytan. He is the brother of Denise Dufort, drummer with Girlschool.

== Career ==
His first band of note was The Scenery, formed in 1966 with Miller Anderson, and subsequently joined by Ian Hunter. In 1968 he rejoined Anderson in Paper Blitz Tissue, but left and was replaced by Bill Bruford. He subsequently toured as part of Ayers' backing band, The Whole World.

In 1979 he joined Pär Ericsson and Bengt Fischer, two former members of the progressive rock band Epizootic in their E. F. Band, but left before their first album. After a spell with Angel Witch, he and their bassist, Kevin Riddles, formed Tytan, in the autumn of 1981. Once again, he left before their first album was recorded.

He now records film music, under the name Hermien Jerian-du'Fort.

== Selected discography ==
- 1970: Lol Coxhill, Ear of Beholder
- 1971: Kevin Ayers, Whatevershebringswesing
- 1992: Kevin Ayers, BBC Radio 1 Live in Concert (recorded for BBC Radio 1 on 6 January 1972)
- 1189: Lionheart, The Third Crusade
