= Lionsheart =

British heavy metal band

- Origin: New Forest, Hampshire, England
- Genres: Heavy metal, hard rock, speed metal
- Years active: 1990–present
- Labels: Music for Nations/Pony Canyon, Metaledge, Frontiers, 3D
- Members: Ian Nash; Steve Hales; Eddie Marsh
- Past members: Steve Grimmett; Graham Collett; Anthony Christmas; Mark Owers; Steve Owers
- Website: lionsheartband.com (archived)

Lionsheart are a British heavy metal band from New Forest, Hampshire, formed in 1990. Founded by Mark Owers and Stephen Owers, Lionsheart's early releases featured fast tempos, instrumentals, and aggressive musicianship. The band found initial success in Japan.

Lionsheart has released four studio albums and one live album.

== History ==
Lionsheart was formed in the New Forest in 1990 by twin musicians Mark and Steve Owers, formerly of Fury and Touche. Lionsheart with the addition of drummer Anthony Christmas and keyboardist Graham Collett, then asked Steve Grimmett to join the band as they admired his vocal talents. They then recorded their first album, at Black Barn Studios with the additional expertise of Robin Black. In 1992, the twins quit the band (a long legal battle then took place, Mark and Stephen Owers were successful in winning their case. The Lillian Axe British/European tour, necessitating the recruitment of guitarists Nick Burr and Zakk Bajjon. The new line-up opened for Magnum on the British tour.

While Lionsheart scored success in Japan on their first album, entitled Lionsheart, their follow-up album, Pride in Tact, achieved another success, selling over 100,000 copies in Japan. The band received a cold response from the British press and an indifferent reaction from British rock fans. In spite of this, the band garnered a successful tour in 1995 with labelmates Tyketto. Anthony Christmas was replaced with Michael O'Brien at this time.

Their third effort, Under Fire, took three years to emerge as legal battles with its record company waged on. Finally released in 1998, the album featured Grimmett and Tyketto guitarist Brooke St. James, Graham Collett and O'Brien. The sales were poor.

At this time, Lionsheart folded and Grimmett founded Pride. In late 2000, Grimmett unveiled Seven Deadly Sins. Joining him on this venture was Collett, Eddie Marsh on bass and Peter Newdeck on drums.

A live recording titled Rising Sons – Live in Japan 1993 emerged in 2000 via the Zoom Club label. Finding some new momentum, Lionsheart reformed and self-financed a new studio album, Abyss. It was recorded at the Warehouse Studio in Oxford throughout May and June 2003. Dallas, Texas based label Metaledge Records, released this album digitally in June 2004 in North America, and Italian based label Frontiers, released the album to the rest of the world. Line-up changes brought Gavin Cooper to the band in May.

In late 2006, Grimmett unveiled his brand new Tewkesbury based band project, simply titled The Steve Grimmett Band; this unit involving guitarist Ian Nash, bassist Ritchie Walker and drummer Pete Newdeck. Album recordings were co-produced by Newdeck and Pink Cream 69 bassist Dennis Ward.

In July 2008, Grimmett was announced as fronting the Fargo, North Dakota heavy metal band Grimmstine, assembled by Methuselah and Dozer guitarist Steve Stine in union with the Sons of Poseidon rhythm section of bassist Hat and drummer Dave Johnson. The latter also has credits with Denied By Christ and Methuselah.

== Band members ==
=== Current ===
- Ian Nash – guitars
- Steve Hales – drums
- Eddie Marsh – bass

=== Former ===
- Steve Grimmett – vocals (1990-2022; his death)
- Anthony Christmas – drums (1990–1995)
- Graham Collett – keyboards (1990–1998)
- Mark Owers – guitars (1990–1992)
- Steve Owers – bass (1990–1992)
- Nick Burr (1992–1997)
- Zak Bajjon (1992–1997)
- Mike O Brien (1995–1998)

== Discography ==
=== Studio albums ===
Year	Title	Label
1992	Lionsheart	Music for Nations
1994	Pride in Tact	Music for Nations
1998	Under Fire	Music for Nations
2004	Abyss	Metaledge Records/Frontiers

=== Live albums ===
Year	Title	Label
2000	"Rising Sons – Live in Japan 1993"	Zoom Club Records
