= Screamin' 'n' Bleedin' =

Studio album by Angel Witch
- Released: August 1985
- Recorded: April 1985
- Studio: AVM Studios, Stafford House, Clough Street, Hanley, Stoke-on-Trent, England
- Genre: Heavy metal
- Length: 44:29
- Label: Killerwatt
- Producer: Les Hunt, Eddie Stevens

Angel Witch chronology
Angel Witch (1980)	Screamin' 'n' Bleedin' (1985)	Frontal Assault (1986)

2004 edition cover

Professional ratings
Review scores
Source	Rating
AllMusic	3/5 stars
Collector's Guide to Heavy Metal	7/10

Screamin' 'n' Bleedin' is the second album by British heavy metal band Angel Witch. The album was released in 1985 through Killerwatt Records. Even though this is the second release of the band, it is the first release with the new line-up of 1984, after the split-up in 1981.

== Track listing ==
Side one
No.	Title	Writer(s)	Length
1.	"Whose to Blame"	Kevin Heybourne, Dave Hogg, Peter Gordelier, David Tattum	4:05
2.	"Child of the Night"	K. Heybourne	3:47
3.	"Evil Games"	K. Heybourne, Sue Heybourne	4:20
4.	"Afraid of the Dark"	K. Heybourne	6:02
5.	"Screamin' 'n' Bleedin'"	K. Heybourne, Hogg	4:41

Side two
No.	Title	Writer(s)	Length
6.	"Reawakening"	K. Heybourne	4:55
7.	"Waltz the Night"	K. Heybourne	5:56
8.	"Goodbye"	K. Heybourne	3:45
9.	"Fatal Kiss"	K. Heybourne, S. Heybourne	4:40
10.	"U.X.V."	K. Heybourne	2:11

2004 re-issue
No.	Title	Length
11.	"Frontal Assault" (live)	3:55
12.	"Screamin' 'n' Bleedin'" (live)	4:16
13.	"Straight from Hell" (live)	3:58

- In 2004, the album was re-issued by Archaic Temple Productions and included three live bonus tracks and new cover art.

== Personnel ==
Angel Witch

- David Tattum – lead vocals
- Kevin Heybourne – guitars, backing vocals
- Peter Gordelier – bass
- Dave Hogg – drums

Production

- Les Hunt – producer, engineer
- Eddie Stevens – executive producer
