= Puerto Muerto =

American indie rock band

- Origin: Chicago
- Genres: Indie rock
- Members: Tim Kelley, Christa Meyer

Puerto Muerto is a Chicago indie rock band composed of formerly married couple Tim Kelley and Christa Meyer.

The couple broke up while in the process of writing and recording Drumming for Pistols, released in February 2010. Critics such as Jim DeRogatis of the Chicago Sun Times hailed the album as "stunningly powerful" partly because it is emotionally grounded in the couple's demise. Both artists formed solo projects: Christa Meyer's band is called Man is Man, and Tim Kelley records as Moss Garvey.

== Discography ==
=== Albums ===
- 2003 - Your Bloated Corpse Has Washed Ashore
- 2004 - See You in Hell
- 2005 - Songs of Muerto County
- 2005 - Songs of Muerto County Revisited
- 2006 - Chamber Music (James Joyce)
- 2008 - I Was a Swallow
- 2010 - Drumming For Pistols

=== Singles ===
- 2004 - "Crimson Beauty"
- 2004 - "San Pedro/Sorrow"
- 2004 - "Stars"
- 2007 - "What Have I Done

=== EPs ===
- 2003 - Elena
- 2007 - Heaven & Dirt
