= Frontal Assault =

Studio album by Angel Witch
- Released: May 1986
- Recorded: January 1986
- Studio: AVM Studios, Stafford House, Clough Street, Hanley, Stoke-on-Trent, England
- Genre: Heavy metal
- Length: 41:14
- Label: Killerwatt
- Producer: Les Hunt, Eddie Stevens

Angel Witch chronology
Screamin' 'n' Bleedin' (1985)	Frontal Assault (1986)	Live (1990)

US promo edition cover

Professional ratings
Review scores
Source	Rating
AllMusic	2/5 stars
Collector's Guide to Heavy Metal	6/10
Kerrang!	2/5 stars

Frontal Assault is the third album by British heavy metal band Angel Witch. The album was released in 1986 through Killerwatt Records.

== Track listing ==
All songs written by Kevin Heybourne except "Dream World" by S. Heybourne and Kevin Heybourne and "Religion (Born Again)" and "Take to the Wing" by David Tattum and Kevin Heybourne.

Side one
No.	Title	Length
1.	"Frontal Assault"	4:01
2.	"Dream World"	3:49
3.	"Rendezvous with the Blade"	6:37
4.	"Religion (Born Again)"	4:17

Side two
No.	Title	Length
5.	"Straight from Hell"	4:18
6.	"She Don't Lie"	5:54
7.	"Take to the Wing"	3:54
8.	"Something Wrong"	4:36
9.	"Undergods"	3:48
Total length:		41:14

- A US promotional copy was released the same year by JCI Records, however, it only featured five tracks from Frontal Assault and other five from Screamin' 'n' Bleedin'. It also featured a different cover art.

US promo
No.	Title	Length
1.	"Dream World"	3:49
2.	"She Don't Lie"	5:54
3.	"Frontal Assault"	4:01
4.	"Something Wrong"	4:36
5.	"Straight from Hell"	4:18
6.	"Evil Games"	4:18
7.	"Waltz the Night"	5:59
8.	"Goodbye"	3:44
9.	"Fatal Kiss"	4:42
10.	"Whose to Blame"	4:06

== Personnel ==
Angel Witch

- David Tattum - lead vocals
- Kevin Heybourne - guitars, backing vocals
- Peter Gordelier - bass, backing vocals
- Spencer Hollman - drums, backing vocals

Production

- Les Hunt - producer, engineer
- Eddie Stevens - executive producer
