= Rock You to Hell =

Studio album by Grim Reaper
- Released: September 1987
- Studios: Long View Farm, North Brookfield, Massachusetts
- Genre: Heavy metal
- Length: 37:14
- Label: RCA
- Producer: Max Norman

Grim Reaper chronology
Fear No Evil (1985)	Rock You to Hell (1987)	Walking in the Shadows (2016)

Professional ratings
Review scores
Source	Rating
AllMusic	2/5 stars
Collector's Guide to Heavy Metal	6/10

Rock You to Hell is the third studio album by the British heavy metal band Grim Reaper, released in 1987 under the RCA label. This was the band's final album for 29 years (until the release of Walking in the Shadows in 2016, under the name Steve Grimmett's Grim Reaper), and their last one to feature guitarist Nick Bowcott, bassist Dave Wanklin and drummer Marc Simon. Grim Reaper gained brief mainstream critical and commercial success with this album, due to the regular airplay of "Rock You to Hell". The song's music video, which featured the band EZO in jail and a cameo by Joey Belladonna of Anthrax, received rotation on MTV's Headbangers Ball and album-oriented rock radio stations.

== Track listing ==
Side one
No.	Title	Lyrics	Music	Length
1.	"Rock You to Hell"	Nick Bowcott, Steve Grimmett	Bowcott	4:01
2.	"Night of the Vampire"	Grimmett	Bowcott	3:45
3.	"Lust for Freedom"	Grimmett	Bowcott	4:26
4.	"When Heaven Comes Down"	Bowcott	Bowcott	4:23
5.	"Suck It and See"	Grimmett	Bowcott	2:34

Side two
No.	Title	Lyrics	Music	Length
6.	"Rock Me 'till I Die"	Grimmett	Bowcott	4:43
7.	"You'll Wish That You Were Never Born"	Bowcott, Grimmett	Bowcott	4:06
8.	"Waysted Love"	Paul DeMercado	Bowcott, DeMercado	4:18
9.	"I Want More"	Grimmett	Bowcott	4:52

== Personnel ==
Grim Reaper

- Steve Grimmett – vocals
- Nick Bowcott – guitar, backing vocals, arrangements
- Dave Wanklin – bass
- Marc Simon – drums, backing vocals

Additional musicians

- Nibby Gibson – backing vocals
- Deke Kenderian – backing vocals

Technical personne;

- Max Norman – producer, engineer, mixing at Atlantic Studios, New York City, arrangements, backing vocals
- Kerry Roher, Jesse Anderson, Claude Achille, Ellen Fitton – assistant engineers
- Garry Sharpe – cover artwork
