= Onslaught (band) =

British thrash metal band

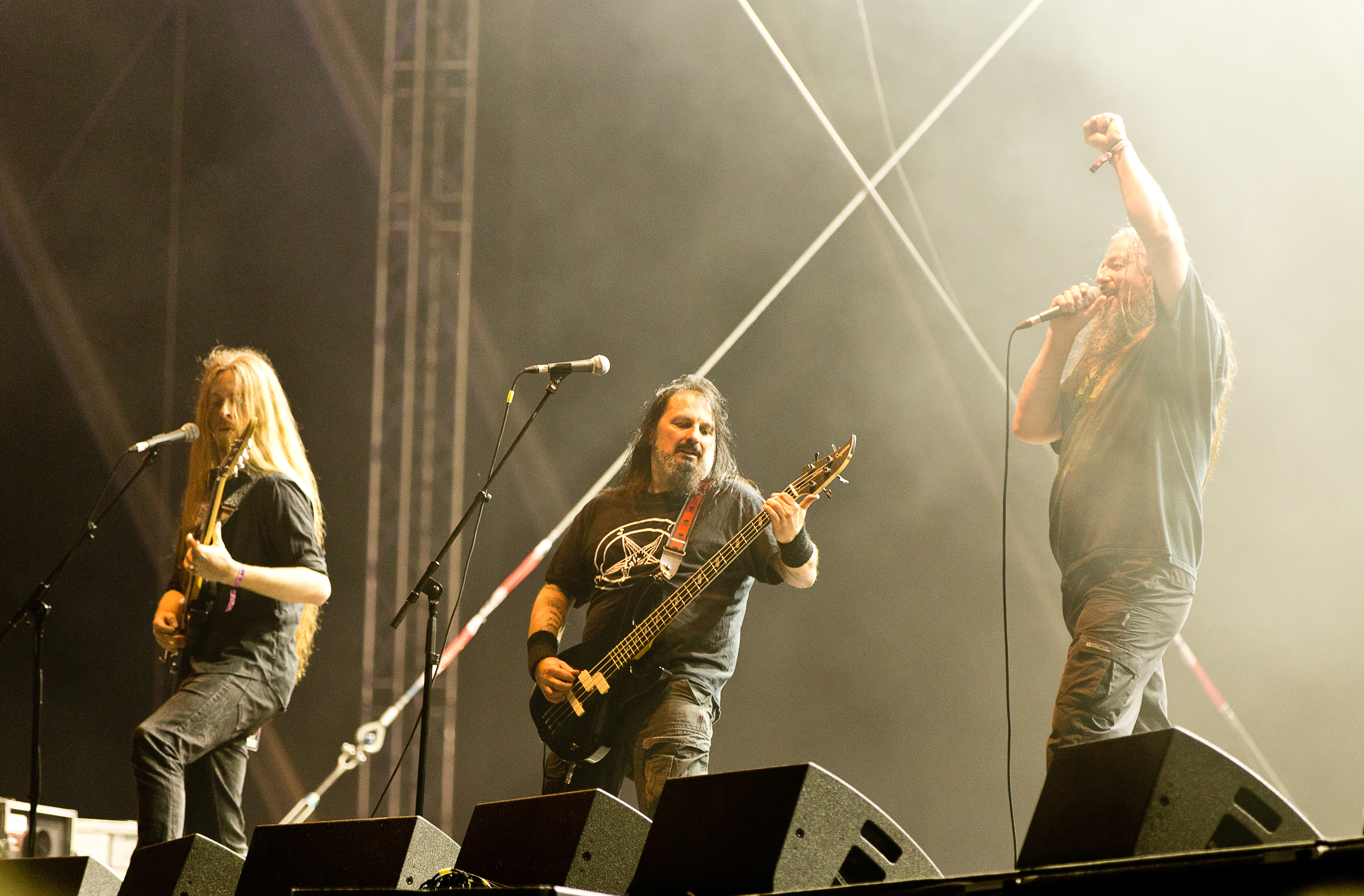
- Onslaught at Rockharz festival 2016 in Germany

Background information
- Origin: Bristol, England, UK
- Genre: Thrash metal
- Years active: 1982–1991; 2005–present
- Labels: Candlelight; London; Under One Flag; Children of the Revolution; AFM; Reigning Phoenix Music
- Members: Nige Rockett; Sy Keeler; Jeff Williams; James Perry; Dave Garnett
- Past members: Jase Pope; Roge Davies; Paul Mahoney; Neil Turbin; Steve Grimmett; Tony O'Hora; Paul Hill; Paul Davis; Jase Stallard; James Hinder; Rob Trotman; Alan Jordan; Andy Rosser-Davies; Michael Hourihan; Leigh Chambers; Steve Grice; Wayne Dorman
- Website: onslaughtuk.com

Onslaught are a British thrash metal band from Bristol, England, active from 1982 to 1991 and again since 2005. The band drew influences from US and British hardcore punk bands such as Discharge and the Exploited, as well as the new wave of British heavy metal (NWOBHM), and eventually adopted a straightforward thrash metal sound. Jason Anderson of AllMusic described their sound as "punishing". They have been recognised as British thrash metal pioneers, and referred to as one of the country's so-called "Big Four", along with Sabbat, Xentrix, and Acid Reign. To date, Onslaught have released eight studio albums, one compilation, four singles, and three live recordings: a live album and two live DVDs.

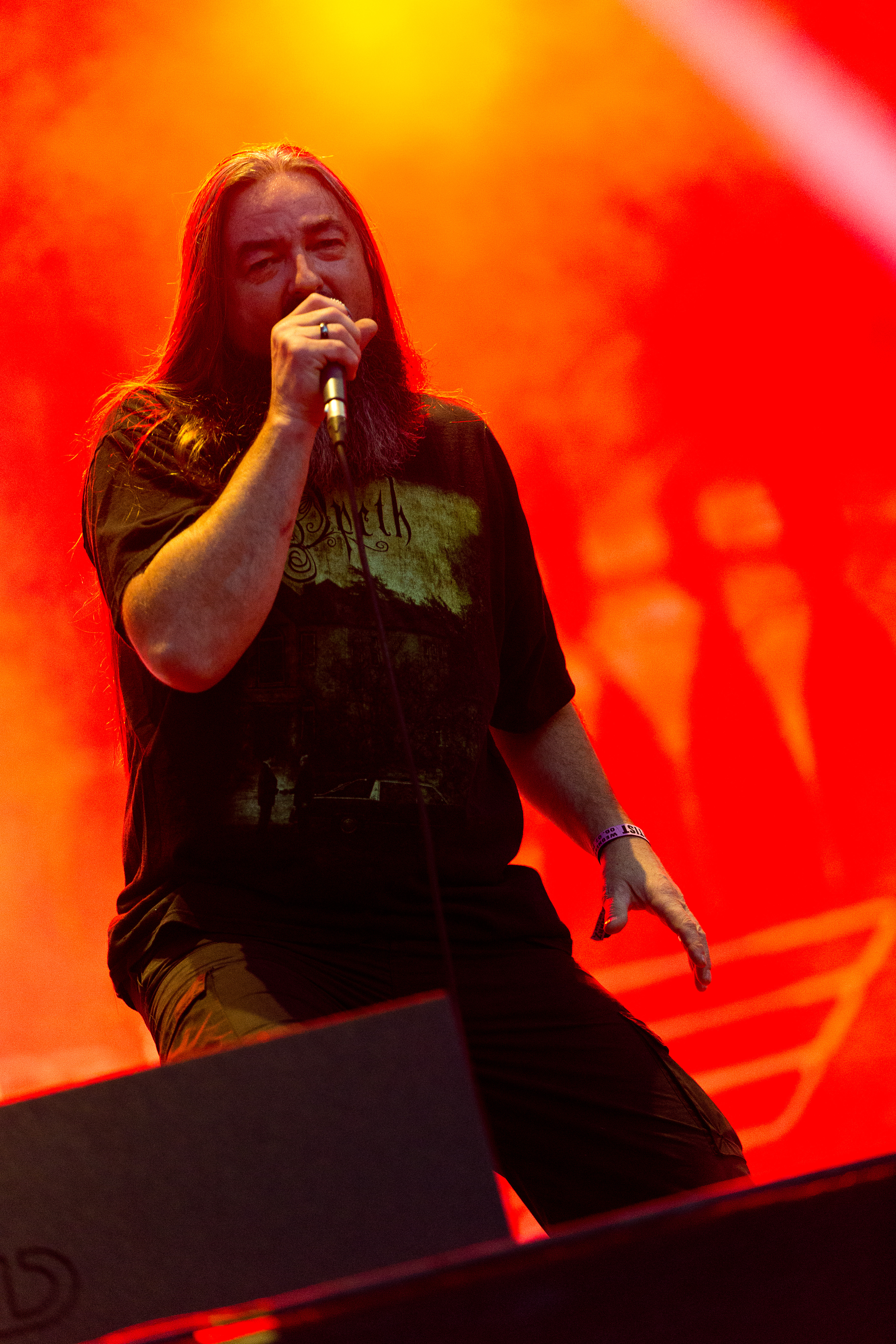
Singer Sy Keeler at the Rockharz festival 2016 in Germany

== History ==
=== Origins and Power from Hell (1982–1985) ===
Onslaught were formed in 1982 in Bristol, England by guitarist Nige Rockett and drummer Steve Grice. The two were working on an aggressive speed metal sound that was popular in the days of early Slayer and Metallica. In 1985, the duo were joined by bassist Jase Stallard and vocalist Paul Mahoney. The quartet wrote enough material for a debut album, Power from Hell, recorded and released later that year on British independent record label, Cor.

The band wrote more heavy metal–oriented songs, rather than their original punk sound. This was influenced by early releases of thrash metal bands, albeit with a darker sound. The band signed to Children of the Revolution Records and released Power from Hell in 1985. Like other metal bands of the time, the lyrics were often Satanic, and the cover showed a demon emerging from a pentagram.

=== The Force, In Search of Sanity and breakup (1985–1991) ===
New singer Sy Keeler joined the band. Paul Mahoney, who joined Onslaught in 1984, took over bass from Jase Stallard, who in turn switched to rhythm guitar, giving the band a second guitarist. By the first months of 1986, the new line-up recorded their second album, The Force, in London. The album was released in May of that year through label Under One Flag. Onslaught toured for about two-and-a-half years in support of it, playing with Motörhead, Exciter, Girlschool, Kreator, Nuclear Assault, Agent Steel, the Crumbsuckers, Angel Dust, Exumer, Messiah, Sabbat and a then-still unknown Anthrax. The album was more successful than Power from Hell, and is considered a classic by many critics and fanzines. Chris Dahlkvist left the band later in 1986, and was replaced by James Hinder.

In 1987, Stallard's guitar playing was questioned. Rockett replaced by with Rob Trotman. This line-up wrote material for a third studio album. London Records signed the band. In mid-1988, the band began recording their third album, In Search of Sanity. The record label felt they needed a more versatile vocalist. Although the band felt that Sy Keeler's vocals sounded right on the demo, the production was more polished and needed a more polished vocalist. Steve Grimmett (formerly of the NWOBHM band Grim Reaper) replaced Keeler. Consequently, the album was delayed until April 1989. Following the success of The Force, and with a new singer, there was much pre-release publicity. In Search of Sanity sounded different than Onslaught's previous releases. While technically a thrash metal album, it shifted towards progressive/power metal, and included the band's longest track to date, "Welcome to Dying". Many fans were disappointed with these changes, which contributed to the band's dissolution. Despite mixed critical reaction, In Search of Sanity is Onslaught's only album to enter the UK Albums Chart, peaking at No. 30, while the cover of AC/DC's "Let There Be Rock" was the band's only single to appear in the UK Singles chart, peaking at No. 50. Onslaught toured for over a year to support In Search of Sanity, playing alongside Annihilator, Xentrix, Slammer, the Crumbsuckers, Horse (not to be confused with the metalcore band from California), Drunken State, Sabbat and Dead On.

In early 1990, Steve Grimmett left the band due to internal reasons, and was replaced by Tony O'Hora. The band wrote and recorded a fourth album. London Records dropped Onslaught, leaving the band without a record deal. Roadrunner offered them £50,000, but Rockett declined to sign for an indie label, and they disbanded in early 1991. Tony O'Hora sung for Praying Mantis and became the lead singer of the Sweet.

=== Reunion and more albums (2005–2018) ===
In 2005, the band were reformed by Steve Grice and joined by Sy Keeler, Nige Rockett, and James Hinder. They were joined by Welsh guitarist Alan Jordan. Writing for the band's fourth album, Killing Peace, began in 2005, and the album was released in early 2007. Hinder left the band in 2006, before the release of Killing Peace, and was replaced by Jeff Williams. This line-up recorded a live DVD in Club Stodola, Warsaw, Poland, released in 2007 by Metal Mind Productions as Live Polish Assault.

In 2008, Jordan was replaced by guitarist Andy Rosser-Davies. In November of that year, the band recorded their live performance at the Damnation Festival in Leeds, resulting in a live album (Dual Disc CD / DVD), Live Damnation. Mixed by a Bristol producer, it was released in August 2009 by Candlelight Records. In June 2010, the band signed to AFM Records to record their fifth studio album, Sounds of Violence, released in January 2011. On 25 March 2011, Steve Grice left the band on the eve of a European tour due to conflicting points of view. Michael Hourihan (Extreme Noise Terror, Desecration) replaced him for the tour, and, in November 2011, became a permanent member of the band. Onslaught recorded their sixth studio album, VI, from April to May, and released it on 20 September 2013.

Former Anthrax singer Neil Turbin joined the band for their Thrash Invasion tour of US and Canada, Brazil and Chile, North and South America in 2014, as Keeler was unable to take part due to family problems. He left the tour for the last week of shows after performing at The Music Hall in Anaheim, California on 24 November 2014, only two days before the tour ended.

The band played the 10th edition of Hellfest in June 2015.

On 14 September 2015, Onslaught recruited Iain GT Davies as a full-time replacement for Andy Rosser Davies. The band stated that Davies would contribute to the songwriting of their next album.

On 27 March 2018, guitarist Iain GT Davies and drummer Mic Hourihan left Onslaught to focus on other projects, amongst other reasons. Rockett said that their replacements were already chosen but not yet revealed. He said that the band would perform a new song from their then-upcoming seventh album at Bloodstock Open Air. On 16 July 2018, guitarist Wayne Dorman and drummer James Perry joined the band.

=== Generation Antichrist, split with Sy Keeler and Origins of Aggression (2018–2025) ===
On 18 November 2018, Onslaught posted a teaser video on Facebook, confirming that they were recording their seventh studio album at Grindstone Studios. The band released the video for their first song in six years "A Perfect Day to Die" in March 2019, which is "a nod to [their] sadly departed friends from Motörhead who were a major influence for Onslaught over the years."

On 29 April 2020, Onslaught announced that vocalist Sy Keeler had once again parted ways with the band, citing his reason as, "Due to the nature of the modern-day music industry, some things simply aren't sustainable year after year and Sy has now taken a different full-time career path." A few days later, it was announced that Keeler was replaced by Dave Garnett, who had previously performed in Onslaught by filling in for him the House of Metal festival in Umeå, Sweden that past February.

On 12 May 2020, Onslaught announced that their seventh studio album, titled Generation Antichrist, would be released on 7 August.

In March 2021, about seven months after the release of Generation Antichrist, Rockett announced that Onslaught had begun working on their eighth studio album, which was in pre-production and planned for release in 2022. Guitarist Wayne Dorman confirmed in a post on Facebook in December 2021 that he had begun writing new material for the band's new album. In October 2023, Onslaught announced they were tracking the album at Tellus Studios in Rio de Janeiro, Brazil.

Back on Black Records released Skullcrusher, a compilation album containing tracks from Onslaught's first four studio albums as well as two early demo tracks, on 10 May 2024.

On 14 March 2025, it was announced that Onslaught were signed to Reigning Phoenix Music, and their first album for the label Origins of Aggression (a double album featuring re-recordings of the band's past songs and song covers) was released on 23 May.

On 13 May 2025, guitarist Wayne Dorman announced that he was leaving the band with immediate effect via his Instagram and Facebook pages, citing personal and professional reasons.

In May 2025, Garnett withdrew from Onslaught's European tour celebrating the 40th anniversary of Power From Hell. Óscar Rilo, frontman of Spanish band Dark Embrace, was recruited with only three days' notice and successfully learned a 15-song setlist, including live staples and the Motörhead cover "Iron Fist". Band statements praised Rilo for "saving" the tour, and reviews highlighted his strong chemistry and intense performance.

=== Second reunion with Sy Keeler (2025–present) ===
On 13 August 2025, it was announced that vocalist Sy Keeler had once again rejoined Onslaught. His first show back in the band took place at the UK's Damnation Festival on 9 November, followed by the band's first Australian tour and a European tour in early 2026 called The Force from Hell.

== Band members ==
=== Current ===
- Nigel "Nige" Rockett – lead guitar (1983–1991, 2018, 2025–2026), rhythm guitar (1983–1985, 1987–1991, 2005–present), lead vocals (1984), backing vocals (2005–present)
- Simon "Sy" Keeler – lead vocals (1985–1988, 2005–2020, 2025–present)
- Jeff Williams – bass guitar (2007–present)
- James Perry – drums (2018–present)
- Nik Sampson – lead guitar (2026–present)

=== Former ===
- Steven Grice – drums (1983–1991, 2005–2011, 2018), backing vocals (1988)
- Jase Pope – lead vocals (1983)
- Paul Hill – bass guitar (1983)
- Paul "Dick" Davis – bass guitar (1983–1984)
- Roger "Roge" Davies – lead vocals (1983–1984)
- Paul "Mo" Mahoney – lead vocals (1984–1985), bass guitar (1985–1987)
- Jason "Jase" Stallard – bass guitar (1984–1985), rhythm guitar (1985–1987)
- James Hinder – bass guitar (1987–1991, 2005–2006), backing vocals (1988–1991)
- Rob Trotman – guitar (1987–1991)
- Steve Grimmett – lead vocals (1988–1990; died 2022)
- Tony O'Hora – lead vocals (1990–1991)
- Alan Jordan – lead guitar (2005–2008)
- Andy Rosser-Davies – lead guitar (2008–2015)
- Mike Hourihan – drums (2011–2018)
- Iain "GT" Davies – lead guitar (2015–2018)
- Wayne Dorman – lead guitar (2018–2025)
- Dave Garnett – lead vocals (2020–2025)

=== Fill-in ===
- Neil Turbin – lead vocals (2014)
- Oscar Rilo – lead vocals (2025)

== Discography ==
=== Studio albums ===
- Power from Hell (1985)
- The Force (1986)
- In Search of Sanity (1989) – UK No. 46
- Killing Peace (2007)
- Sounds of Violence (2011)
- VI (2013)
- Generation Antichrist (2020)
- Origins of Aggression (2025)

=== Compilation albums ===
- Shadow of Death (2008, compilation of early demos)
- Skullcrusher (2024)

=== Singles ===
- "Let There Be Rock" (AC/DC cover, 1987, originally released on Music for Nations)
- "Let There Be Rock" (AC/DC cover, 1989, re-recorded and released on London Records) – UK No. 50
- "Welcome to Dying" (1989, London Records)
- "Shellshock" (1989, London Records)
- "Bomber" (Motörhead cover)/"The Sound of Violence" (17 December 2010) – "Bomber" features Phil Campbell from Motörhead on guitar and Tom Angelripper from Sodom on vocals. "The Sound of Violence" is taken from the AFM album Sounds of Violence.
- "A Perfect Day to Die" (8 March 2019)
- "Religiousuicide" (29 May 2020)

=== Live recordings ===
==== Albums ====
- Live Damnation (2009)

==== DVDs ====
- Live Polish Assault 2007 (2008)
- Live at the Slaughterhouse (2016)
