= Angel Witch (album) =

Studio album by Angel Witch
- Released: December 1980
- Recorded: September–October 1980
- Studio: Roundhouse, London
- Genre: Heavy metal
- Length: 38:20
- Label: Bronze
- Producer: Martin Smith

Angel Witch chronology
Angel Witch (1980)	Screamin' 'n' Bleedin' (1985)

Singles from Angel Witch
- 1. "Angel Witch" Released: 1980

Angel Witch is the first album by British heavy metal band Angel Witch. The album was released in 1980 through Bronze Records, and since then re-released in four editions over the years. The cover features a painting formerly attributed to John Martin titled The Fallen Angels Entering Pandemonium. The album made Angel Witch one of the key bands in the new wave of British heavy metal (NWOBHM) scene, and has proven influential on subsequent movements, particularly on then-upcoming thrash, speed, doom and extreme metal artists.

== Reception and legacy ==
Professional ratings
Review scores
Source	Rating
AllMusic	4.5/5 stars
Collector's Guide to Heavy Metal	10/10
Sounds	1.5/5 stars
Sounds	5/5 stars
Sputnikmusic	4/5 stars

Angel Witch received generally very positive reviews. The only exception was the very first review of the album by journalist Paul Suter for the influential British music paper Sounds in 1980. Suter defined the album "appalling" and "weedy", marred by a "destructively dreadful" production and by weak vocals. Another Sounds reviewer Malcolm Dome, on the contrary, loved the album for its aggressiveness mixed with melody and declared it the "album of the year" together with Girlschool's Demolition. Canadian reviewer Martin Popoff says that this is "the only Angel Witch album of deep importance", being "the first panoramic black metal statement of the modern era"; its "mix of gothic melody, sinister surprise and scorching dense riffery" establishes "the band as genuinely scary" and "isolated and elevated from the fun-loving metal community" of the time. Mike Stagno of the Sputnikmusic editorial staff reminds how Angel Witch "is regarded by many as a NWOBHM classic alongside the likes of Iron Maiden, On Through the Night, and Wheels of Steel" and, despite some flaws in the general sound, it is "a gem"; he adds that the band Angel Witch "never really achieved what they deserved." The AllMusic review underlines this last concept and defines the album a "metal classic". Chad Bowar of About.com recommends the album, which deserve much recognition for being one of the NWOBHM albums responsible for "shaping the rise of thrash metal in the mid '80s" and "a major part of one of the most important eras of metal".

The opening track "Angel Witch" was featured in the 2009 video game, Brütal Legend.

== Track listings ==
All tracks are written by Kevin Heybourne.

Side one
No.	Title	Length
1.	"Angel Witch"	3:25
2.	"Atlantis"	3:42
3.	"White Witch"	4:48
4.	"Confused"	2:52
5.	"Sorcerers"	4:16

Side two
No.	Title	Length
6.	"Gorgon"	4:06
7.	"Sweet Danger"	3:07
8.	"Free Man"	4:44
9.	"Angel of Death"	4:52
10.	"Devil's Tower"	2:28
Total length:		38:20

In 1990, the album was re-issued by Roadrunner Records and contained three bonus tracks. The three tracks were originally featured on the 1981 EP Loser.

1990 re-issue bonus tracks
No.	Title	Length
11.	"Loser"	2:50
12.	"Suffer"	3:24
13.	"Dr. Phibes"	2:50
Total length:		47:24

In 2000, the album was re-issued by Castle Records and contained six bonus tracks, in addition to the 3 previous bonus tracks, the album also included the following three tracks. Tracks 14 and 16 that were originally B-sides for the Sweet Danger EP. Track 15 is from the NWOBHM compilation album Metal for Muthas.

2000 re-issue bonus tracks
No.	Title	Length
14.	"Flight Nineteen"	5:55
15.	"Baphomet"	5:00
16.	"Hades Paradise"	4:39
Total length:		62:58

On 2 August 2005, the album was re-issued by Castle Records again labeled the 25th Anniversary Expanded Edition, with slightly different album cover. It also featured a remastered sound and an expanded booklet, as well as even more bonus tracks. In addition to the above six bonus tracks, it also included the following 4 tracks, recorded for 14 March 1980 edition of the BBC's Friday Rock Show.

2005 re-issue bonus tracks
No.	Title	Length
17.	"Sweet Danger (live)"	3:13
18.	"Angel of Death (live)"	5:13
19.	"Extermination Day (live)"	3:40
20.	"Angel Witch (live)"	3:31
Total length:		78:34

=== 30th Anniversary edition ===
In 2010 the album was re-issued by Sanctuary Records in a 2-Disc version, adding demos and other versions of some songs with a total of 30 songs.

Disc one
No.	Title	Length
1.	"Angel Witch"	3:23
2.	"Atlantis"	3:42
3.	"White Witch"	4:47
4.	"Confused"	2:51
5.	"Sorcerers"	4:14
6.	"Gorgon"	4:04
7.	"Sweet Danger"	3:04
8.	"Free Man"	4:42
9.	"Angel of Death"	4:52
10.	"Devil's Tower"	2:25
11.	"Sweet Danger" (BBC Friday Rock Show session)	3:11
12.	"Angel of Death" (BBC Friday Rock Show session)	5:11
13.	"Extermination Day" (BBC Friday Rock Show session)	3:38
14.	"Angel Witch" (BBC Friday Rock Show session)	3:32

Disc two
No.	Title	Length
1.	"Devil's Tower" (Demo)	5:52
2.	"White Witch" (Demo)	5:20
3.	"Baphomet" (Demo)	7:17
4.	"Sorceress" (Demo)	4:25
5.	"Extermination Day" (Demo)	3:57
6.	"Flight Nineteen" (Demo)	6:28
7.	"Hades Paradise" (Demo)	6:07
8.	"Baphomet" (Metal for Muthas LP version)	4:57
9.	"Sweet Danger" (12" single A-side)	3:10
10.	"Hades Paradise" (12" single B-side)	4:37
11.	"Flight Nineteen" (12" single B-side)	5:52
12.	"Angel Witch" (7" single edit)	3:12
13.	"Gorgon" (7" B-side)	4:04
14.	"Loser" (7" Loser EP A-side)	2:49
15.	"Suffer" (7" Loser EP B-side)	3:23
16.	"Dr. Phibes" (7" Loser EP B-side)	2:49
Total length:		127:55

In 2016, the album was reissued in colored vinyl, with the same track listing as its first release.

== Personnel ==
Band members

- Kevin Heybourne – guitars, lead vocals
- Kevin Riddles – bass, keyboards, backing vocals
- Dave Hogg – drums

Production

- Martin Smith – producer
- Mark Dearnley, Ashley Howe, John Gallen – engineers
- Jools Cooper, Nick Rogers – assistant engineers
