= Fear No Evil (Grim Reaper album) =

Studio album by Grim Reaper
- Released: 30 May 1985
- Recorded: 1985
- Studio: Ebony Studios, Hull, England
- Genre: Heavy metal
- Length: 38:30
- Label: Ebony
- Producer: Darryl Johnston

Grim Reaper chronology
See You in Hell (1983)	Fear No Evil (1985)	Rock You to Hell (1987)

Professional ratings
Review scores
Source	Rating
AllMusic	3/5 stars
Collector's Guide to Heavy Metal	8/10

Fear No Evil is the second studio album by English heavy metal band Grim Reaper, released in 1985 under the British independent label Ebony Records.

== Track listing ==
All tracks by Nick Bowcott and Steve Grimmett.

Side one
No.	Title	Length
1.	"Fear No Evil"	3:59
2.	"Never Coming Back"	3:32
3.	"Lord of Darkness (Your Living Hell)"	2:59
4.	"Matter of Time"	4:14
5.	"Rock and Roll Tonight"	4:03

Side two
No.	Title	Length
6.	"Let the Thunder Roar"	4:05
7.	"Lay It on the Line"	4:08
8.	"Fight for the Last"	2:59
9.	"Final Scream"	5:28

== Personnel ==
Grim Reaper

- Steve Grimmett – vocals
- Nick Bowcott – guitar
- Dave Wanklin – bass
- Mark Simon – drums

Technical personnel

- Darryl Johnston – producer, engineer
- Nick Bowcott – arrangements
- Howie Weinberg – mastering
- Walter O'Brien, Bob Chiappardi – worldwide representation for Concret Management
- Kim Seabourne – artwork, sleeve concept

== Charts ==
Chart performance for Fear No Evil
Chart	Peak position
US Billboard 200	111

== See also ==
- Grotesque Impalement, the intro to "Final Scream" was redone by Dying Fetus on this EP, where Michael's name was changed to Davey.
