= Steve Grimmett =

British singer (1959–2022)

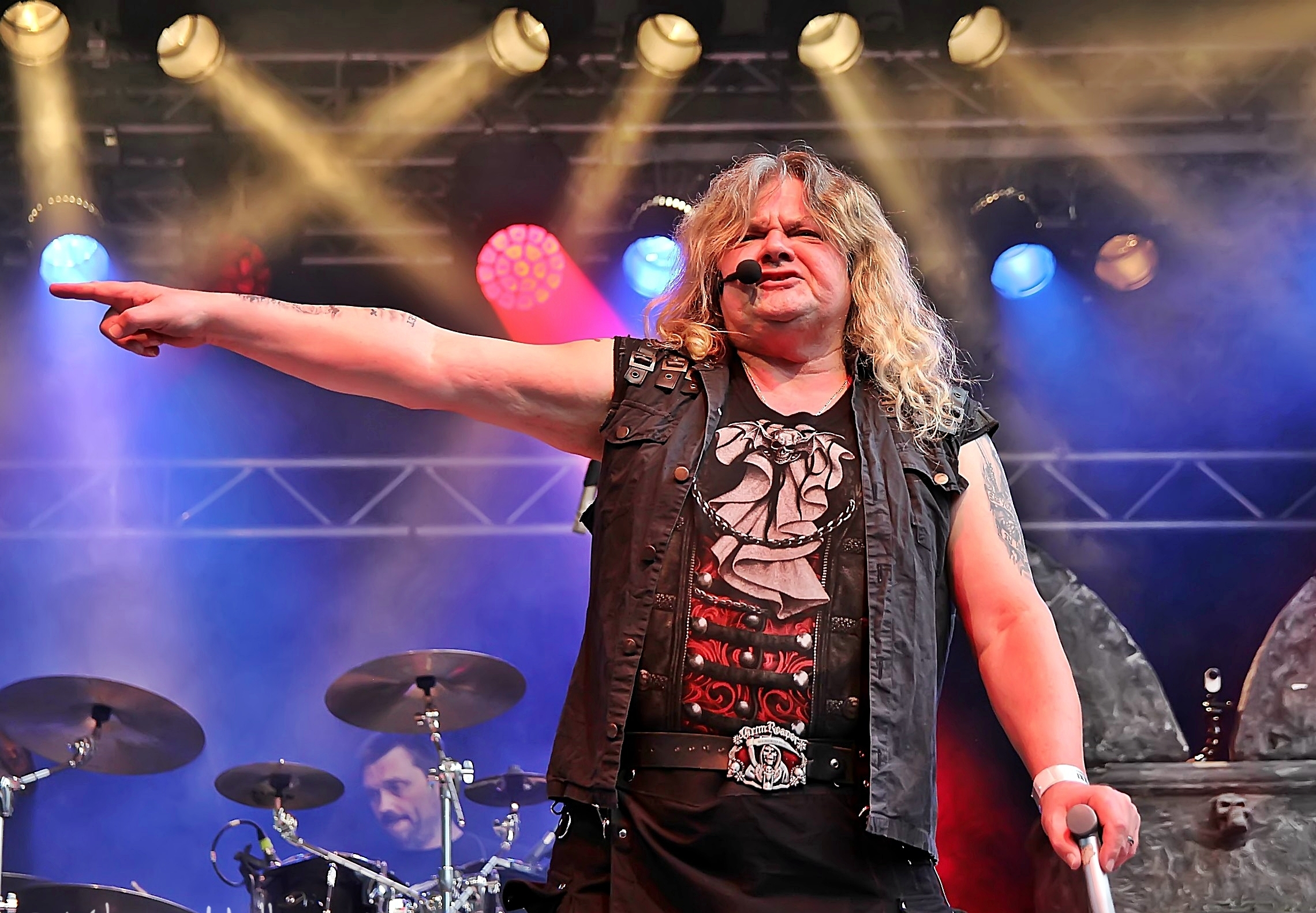
- Grimmett in 2018

Background information
- Born: Stephen Grimmett; 19 August 1959; Buckinghamshire, England
- Died: 15 August 2022 (aged 62)
- Genre: Heavy metal
- Occupation: Musician
- Instrument: Vocals
- Years active: 1978–2022

Stephen Grimmett (19 August 1959 – 15 August 2022) was a British singer who was the lead singer and frontman of the heavy metal band Grim Reaper. Of Grim Reaper's numerous lineups over the band's existence Grimmett was the sole consistent member from 1982 to 1988, then 2006 until his death in 2022. Outside of Grim Reaper, Grimmett has been associated with various metal-based acts/projects.

== Career ==
Grimmett began his career in the era of new wave of British heavy metal. His original band was the short-lived Medusa, before he became known as the lead vocalist for Grim Reaper. Grimmett later featured in Onslaught for a brief period, before forming Lionsheart and in more recent times, the Steve Grimmett Band and GrimmStine.

Grim Reaper achieved major success worldwide with three highly acclaimed studio albums along with single releases and MTV airplay. After Grim Reaper came a brief spell with Onslaught, with a debut single that charted in the UK. The Steve Grimmett Band is a more recent project, with Grimmett backed by Ian Nash, Chaz Grimaldi and Pete Newdeck. This band has continued to gig as Steve Grimmett's Grim Reaper with a lineup now featuring Mark Rumble on drums.

Grimmett had just come back from the US promoting his international band GrimmStine which included Grimmett on vocals, Steve Stine on guitar, Hat on bass and Dave Johnson on drums. Their self-titled debut album was released in 2008.

Grimmett recorded a music video in conjunction with a commercial for Garmin that aired during the 2007 Super Bowl XLI.

In January 2017, Grimmett was hospitalized in Ecuador due to an aggressive infection on his right leg below the knee, where it was amputated in the process. He remained stationed in the medical facility until being released in February. In April, he began to walk again with a prosthetic metal leg attached. On 14 July, Grimmett performed on stage for the first time since his operation in a wheelchair at Bang Your Head!!!.

=== Other projects ===
==== The Sanity Days ====
In 2011, Steve Grimmett and other ex-Onslaught band members launched a new project called the Sanity Days. They intended to be together for a limited period playing songs from Onslaught's most commercially successful album In Search Of Sanity at well-known festivals.

On 7 December 2012, the Sanity Days performed at a concert to launch the inaugural International Day of Heavy Metal. The Sanity Days were the headline band, with Severenth and Twisted State of Mind as support. The band played festival shows in 2013, including shows in Dubai, Japan and South America.

In August and September 2013, Grimmett produced and recorded British grunge-metal band Burnthru for their second album, Faithless.

On 24 March 2015, the Sanity Days released an album with all-new material called Evil Beyond Belief.

==== Steve Grimmett's Grim Reaper ====
Since 2006, the band has made several successful appearances at festivals around Europe, including Keep It True, British Steel, Muskelrock, and Sword brothers. This lineup of the band also recorded his solo album Personal Crisis in 2007. In November 2011, to coincide with their run of gigs in Greece and Cyprus, the band issued the ltd edition live EP Live in Europe featuring classic Reaper tracks. The band appeared as headliners of the British Steel festival in London in June and co-headliners of Belgium's Heavy Sound festival in November 2013. With the current incarnation of Grim Reaper, the album Walking in the Shadows was released on 23 September 2016.

== Death ==
Grimmett died on 15 August 2022, at the age of 62.

== Discography ==
Medusa

- Clash of the Titans (2005 CD reissue of demo and rehearsal tracks recorded in the late 1970s)

Chateaux

- Chained and Desperate (1983)

Grim Reaper

- See You in Hell (1984)
- Fear No Evil (1985)
- Rock You to Hell (1987)

Onslaught

- In Search of Sanity (1989)

The Sanity Days

- Evil Beyond Belief (2015)

Lionsheart

- Lionsheart (1992)
- Pride in Tact (1994)
- Under Fire (1998)
- Rising Sons – Live in Japan 1993 (2002)
- Abyss (2004)

Tribute CD appearances

- 666: The Number One Beast – A Tribute to Iron Maiden Vol 1 and 2 (1999 and 2000), also available as two-CD set called A Double Dose of Maiden or The Maiden Years

Tracks include Steve's vocals on "2 Minutes to Midnight", "The Number of the Beast" "Aces High", and "Wasted Years". Ian Nash plays guitar on these tracks.

- Gimme All Your Top - A Tribute To ZZ Top (2000)

Tracks include Steve's vocals on "Sharp Dressed Man",

- Only UFO Can Rock Me – A Tribute to UFO (2001)

Track – Rock Bottom

- The Boys Are Back – A Tribute to Thin Lizzy (2004) also available as "Top Musicians Play the Music of Thin Lizzy"

Tracks include "The Boys Are Back in Town", "Jailbreak", "Killer on the Loose", "Sarah" and "Cowboy Song"

- Snakebite – A tribute to Whitesnake

Tracks include "Still of the Night", "Slow and Easy", "Fool for Your Loving"

- Another Hair of the Dog – A Tribute to Nazareth

Track – "Bad Bad Boy"

Ezo

- Fire Fire (1989) – backing vocals

Marshall Law

- Warning from History (1999) – backing vocals

Friction

- Friction (2002)

The Steve Grimmett Band

- Personal Crisis (2007)

GrimmStine

- GrimmStine (2008)

Empires of Eden

- Reborn in Fire (2010) – vocals on "This Time"
- Channeling the Infinite (2012) – vocals on "Beyond Daybreak"

EvilRock

- Western Dawn Rider (2013) – vocals on "A Sign to Speak"

Steve Grimmett's Grim Reaper

- Live in Europe – limited edition CD EP (2011)
- Walking in the Shadows (2016)

Cradle of Filth

- Dusk and Her Embrace (2016) – additional vocals, narration

Wolfpakk

- Wolves Reign (2017) – vocals on "Scream of the Hawk"
