= Power from Hell (Onslaught album) =

Studio album by Onslaught
- Released: 4 February 1985: 25 June 1985 (US) 2011 (reissue)
- Recorded: December 1984: 2010 (tracks 13 and 14)
- Studios: AVM Studios, Stoke on Trent, England
- Genres: Thrash metal; speed metal
- Length: 42:15: 48:59 (2011 reissue)
- Label: Children of the Revolution: Pusmort (US) AFM Records (2011 reissue)
- Producer: Les Hunt

Onslaught chronology
What Lies Ahead? (1983)	Power from Hell (1985)	The Force (1986)

Professional ratings
Review scores
Source	Rating
AllMusic	favourable
Metal Forces	10/10
Martin Popoff	5/10 stars

Power from Hell is the debut studio album by English thrash metal band Onslaught, released on 4 February 1985 through Children of the Revolution.

Apparently confusion has arisen as to who coined the term Death Metal, as it was Onslaught who wrote their song "Death Metal" in late 1984 and recorded the album version later in the same year, and Possessed who recorded their song entitled "Death Metal" on their 1984 demo tape of the same name.

Power from Hell was reissued in 1996 by Powerage Records, again in 2005 by Blackend Records and received a full remaster by Jacob Hansen for the 2011 release on AFM Records. This release rectifies the track listing problem encountered on previous releases and has revamped artwork with liner notes by Steve Grice.

== Track listing ==
Liner notes adapted from the original LP.

All tracks are written by Nige Rockett (*), except where noted.

Side A (Death Side)
No.	Title	Writer(s)	Length
1.	"Damnation" (Prelude)		0:36
2.	"Onslaught (Power from Hell)"		4:48
3.	"Thermonuclear Devastation"	P. Hill	1:31
4.	"Skullcrusher I" (Instrumental)		4:39
5.	"Lord of Evil"	*, Paul Mahoney	7:07
6.	"Death Metal"	*, Mahoney	3:42

Side B (Side Metal)
No.	Title	Length
7.	"Angels of Death"	3:21
8.	"The Devil's Legion"	4:07
9.	"Steel Meets Steel"	3:55
10.	"Skullcrusher II" (Instrumental)	3:46
11.	"Witch Hunt"	3:45
12.	"Mighty Empress" (Instrumental)	0:58
Total length:		42:15

25th anniversary remastered edition bonus tracks
No.	Title	Length
13.	"Thermonuclear Devastation of the Planet Earth"	1:39
14.	"Power from Hell"	5:05
Total length:		48:59

Notes

- "Mighty Empress" contains part of O Fortuna
- The 25th anniversary release by AFM Records contains 2 re-recorded versions of "Thermonuclear Devastation of the Planet Earth" and "Power from Hell" from 2011

== Personnel ==
Liner notes adapted from the original LP.

Onslaught

- Paul Mahoney (Mo) – vocals (except tracks 6 and 8, 13 and 14)
- Nige Rockett – guitars, vocals (tracks 6 and 8)
- Jason Stallard – bass guitar (except tracks 13 and 14)
- Steve Grice – drums, art direction

Additional musicians (tracks 13 and 14)

- Sy Keeler – vocals
- Andy Rosser-Davies – guitars
- Jeff Williams — bass guitar

Production

- Les Hunt – producer
- Steve Woolley – cover art
- Des Parton – engineering
