= See You in Hell (album) =

Studio album by Grim Reaper
- Released: 1983; 13 July 1984 (USA)
- Recorded: Ebony Records Studios, Hull, England
- Genre: Heavy metal
- Length: 33:10
- Label: Ebony
- Producer: Darryl Johnston

Grim Reaper chronology
See You in Hell (1983)	Fear No Evil (1985)

See You in Hell is the debut studio album by British heavy metal band Grim Reaper, released on the independent record label Ebony Records in 1983. The album cover was designed by Garry Sharpe-Young.

== Critical reception ==
Professional ratings
Review scores
Source	Rating
AllMusic	4/5 stars
Collector's Guide to Heavy Metal	10/10
Metal Forces	9/10 stars

The title track was ranked No. 38 on VH1's 40 Most Awesomely Bad Metal Songs Ever countdown. According to vocalist Steve Grimmett in a 1984 interview, "Dead on Arrival" is about his friendship with Brian Field who was involved with the Great Train Robbery.

== Track listing ==
All tracks by Nick Bowcott and Steve Grimmett, except "The Show Must Go On" by Bowcott and Paul DeMercado

Side one
No.	Title	Length
1.	"See You in Hell"	4:18
2.	"Dead on Arrival"	4:34
3.	"Liar"	2:49
4.	"Wrath of the Ripper"	3:14

Side two
No.	Title	Length
5.	"Now or Never"	2:53
6.	"Run for Your Life"	3:42
7.	"The Show Must Go On"	7:26
8.	"All Hell Let Loose"	4:25

== Personnel ==
Grim Reaper

- Steve Grimmett – vocals
- Nick Bowcott – guitar
- Dave Wanklin – bass
- Lee Harris – drums

Technical personnel

- Darryl Johnston – producer, engineer
- Ebony Artists management – management
- Garry Sharpe – sleeve design

== Charts ==
Chart performance for See You in Hell
Chart (1984)	Peak position
US Billboard 200	73
