= This Means War (Tank album) =

Studio album by Tank
- Released: 10 June 1983
- Recorded: 1983
- Genre: Heavy metal
- Length: 39:59
- Label: Music for Nations
- Producer: John Verity

Tank chronology
Power of the Hunter (1982)	This Means War (1983)	Honour & Blood (1984)

Singles from This Means War
- 1. "Echoes of a Distant Battle" Released: 1983

Professional ratings
Review scores
Source	Rating
AllMusic	4/5 stars
Collector's Guide to Heavy Metal	9/10
Sounds	4.5/5 stars

This Means War is the third album by English heavy metal band Tank, released in 1983. On this album, the line-up expanded to a four-piece, with the addition of second guitarist Mick Tucker, former member of the NWOBHM band White Spirit. Thanks to Tucker's songwriting contributions and to the sound being expanded by an extra guitar, the band changed their music in comparison with their previous albums with longer, more melodic compositions, which helped differentiate Tank from Motörhead, the band they were often compared to.

== Track listing ==
All songs written by Tank.

Side one

1. "Just Like Something from Hell" – 8:30
2. "Hot Lead, Cold Steel" – 5:46
3. "This Means War" – 5:18

Side two

4. "Laughing in the Face of Death" – 5:16
5. "(If We Go) We Go Down Fighting" – 5:26
6. "I (Won't Ever Let You Down)" – 4:40
7. "Echoes of a Distant Battle" – 5:03

CD edition bonus tracks

Since 2007, editions of the album have been available on CD with the following bonus tracks:

8. "The Man Who Never Was" (B-side of "Echoes of a Distant Battle" single) – 4:31
9. "Whichcatchewedmycuckoo" (additional B-side of "Echoes of a Distant Battle" 12") – 3:20
10. "Swapiyayo" (hidden track on original LP releases, title taken from 1984 French release) – 1:13

== Personnel ==
Tank

- Algy Ward – vocals, bass
- Peter Brabbs – guitar
- Mick Tucker – guitar
- Mark Brabbs – drums

Production

- Produced by John Verity
- Cover art by Chris Webster
