= New Wave of British Heavy Metal '79 Revisited =

Compilation album by Various artists
- Released: 1990
- Recorded: 1979–1981
- Genre: Heavy metal
- Length: 1 hr. 59 min.
- Label: Caroline
- Producer: Lars Ulrich, Geoff Barton

Professional ratings
Review scores
Source	Rating
AllMusic	4.5/5 stars
Select	3/5 medals

New Wave of British Heavy Metal '79 Revisited is a compilation album of various songs by various artists of the NWOBHM. The compilation was assembled by Metallica drummer Lars Ulrich and music journalist Geoff Barton and released in 1990 on Caroline Records and later Metal Blade Records.

== Track listing ==
=== Disc One ===
1. "It's Electric" - Diamond Head
2. "Eye of the Storm" - Sweet Savage
3. "Motorcycle Man" - Saxon
4. "Cheetah" - White Spirit
5. "Don't Need Your Money" - Raven
6. "White Lightning" - Paralex
7. "Getcha Rocks Off" - Def Leppard
8. "Set the Stage Alight" - Weapon
9. "Vice Versa" - Samson
10. "Fight with the Devil" - Hollow Ground
11. "Demolition Boys" - Girlschool
12. "Leaving Nadir" - Witchfynde
13. "Treason" - A-II-Z
14. "Witchfinder General" - Witchfinder General
15. "Red Lights" - Black Axe

=== Disc Two ===
1. "Sanctuary" - Iron Maiden
2. "Back Street Woman" - Jaguar
3. "Killers" - Tygers of Pan Tang
4. "I'm No Fool" - Gaskin
5. "Sledgehammer" - Sledgehammer
6. "Angel Dust" - Venom
7. "Extermination Day" - Angel Witch
8. "One of These Days" - Trespass
9. "Death or Glory" - Holocaust
10. "If I Were King" - Vardis
11. "Blitzkrieg" - Blitzkrieg
12. "Helpless" - Diamond Head
13. "Captured City" - Praying Mantis
14. "Ambitions" - Dragster
15. "S.S. Giro" - Fist

=== Disc One Metal Blade Version With Bonus Tracks ===
1. "It's Electric" - Diamond Head
2. "Eye of the Storm" - Sweet Savage
3. "Motorcycle Man" - Saxon
4. "Cheetah" - White Spirit
5. "Don't Need Your Money" - Raven
6. "White Lightning" - Paralex
7. "Getcha Rocks Off" - Def Leppard
8. "Set the Stage Alight" - Weapon
9. "Vice Versa" - Samson
10. "Fight with the Devil" - Hollow Ground
11. "Demolition Boys" - Girlschool
12. "Leaving Nadir" - Witchfynde

=== Disc Two Metal Blade Version With Bonus Tracks ===
1. "Sanctuary" - Iron Maiden
2. "Back Street Woman" - Jaguar
3. "Killers" - Tygers of Pan Tang
4. "I'm No Fool" - Gaskin
5. "Sledgehammer" - Sledgehammer
6. "Angel Dust" - Venom
7. "Extermination Day" - Angel Witch
8. "One of These Days" - Trespass
9. "Death or Glory" - Holocaust
10. "If I Were King" - Vardis
11. "Blitzkrieg" - Blitzkrieg
12. "Helpless" - Diamond Head
13. "Ambitions" - Dragster
14. "Treason" - A-II-Z
15. "Witchfinder General" - Witchfinder General
16. "Red Lights" - Black Axe
17. "S.S. Giro" - Fist
18. "Captured City" - Praying Mantis
