= Hollow Ground (band) =

British heavy metal band

Background information
- Origin: South Shields, England
- Genres: Heavy metal
- Years active: 1979–1982, 2007, 2013
- Label: Guardian Records
- Members: Brian Rickman; Martin Metcalf; Glenn Coates; Jon Lockney

Hollow Ground were an English heavy metal band.

== History ==
Formed in the North East of England in the late 1970s, Hollow Ground became one of the cutting edge groups of the new wave of British heavy metal (NWOBHM) period. Although they only released six tracks, these have come to be considered a classic example of the style of the era. In 1980, they released the Warlord EP containing the tracks "Flying High", "Warlord", "Rock On", and "Don't Chase the Dragon". This 7-inch record is difficult to find and now changes hands for £200 in mint condition. Later in 1980, a further two tracks ("Fight with the Devil" and "The Holy One") were recorded and were used along with "Rock On" and "Flying High" on the Roksnax split album. Four more tracks were recorded, "Rock to Love", "Promised Land", "Easy Action", and "Loser", but were never released. In 1990, "Fight with the Devil" was included on the Lars Ulrich/Geoff Barton compilation album NWOBHM '79 Revisited. The original Warlord EP tracks can also be found on the compilation CD Rare Metal: N.W.O.B.H.M. Metal Rarities, Volume 1.

Singer Glenn Coates left Hollow Ground to join Fist in 1982 for their Back with a Vengeance album. This defection signalled the end for Hollow Ground.

Lead guitarist Martin Metcalf later recorded the classic rock album Powerhouse with former Geordie vocalist Dr. Rob Turnbull in 1986

In 2007, the band were asked to reform and play at the Headbangers Open Air festival in Germany. They were received favourably, particularly by fans of the NWOBHM, who were delighted to see one of the "lost "bands of that era perform live.

Hollow Ground also appeared on the bill with Jameson Raid and Cloven Hoof for a gig at Wolverhampton Civic Hall on 30 March 2013.

== Members ==
- Glenn Coates – vocals
- Martin Metcalf – lead guitar
- Brian Rickman – bass
- John Lockney – drums

== Discography ==
=== EPs ===
- Warlord (1980; 7-inch; Guardian Records)
1. "Flying High" – 2:56
2. "Warlord" – 2:20
3. "Rock On" – 3:07
4. "Don't Chase the Dragon" – 3:49

=== Albums ===
- Roksnax (1980; split album; Guardian Records)
1. "Die or deliver" by Samurai – 4:39
2. "Rock on" by Hollow Ground – 3:04
3. "Speed of sound" by Saracen – 4:26
4. "Fight with the devil" by Hollow Ground – 3:14
5. "Temptress" by Samurai – 2:26
6. "Fast living" by Saracen – 3:46
7. "Flying high" by Hollow Ground – 2:52
8. "Feel just the same" by Saracen – 3:17
9. "Knights in painted castles" by Samurai – 2:36
10. "The holy one" by Hollow Ground – 3:34
11. "Spirits of the lost" by Samurai – 3:36
12. "Setting the world ablaze" by Saracen – 3:44

=== Other appearances ===
- "Fight with the Devil" appears on NWOBHM '79 Revisited (1990; CD; Caroline Records)
- The Warlord EP appears on Rare Metal: N.W.O.B.H.M. Metal Rarities, Volume 1 (1996; CD; British Steel Records)

== See also ==
- List of new wave of British heavy metal bands
