= White Spirit (band) =

English heavy metal band

- Origin: Hartlepool, England
- Genres: Heavy metal
- Years active: 1975–1981, 2022–2024
- Labels: MCA, Neat, Conquest Music
- Past members: Bruce Ruff; Janick Gers; Phil Brady; Graeme Crallan; Malcolm Pearson; Brian Howe; Mick Tucker; Ian Shuttleworth; Toby Sadler

White Spirit were an English heavy metal band from Hartlepool, best remembered for guitarist Janick Gers who went on to play with Ian Gillan, Bruce Dickinson, and ultimately, Iron Maiden. Other original members of the band were Bruce Ruff (vocals), Malcolm Pearson (keyboards), Phil Brady (bass) and Graeme Crallan (drums), with a later lineup including Brian Howe (vocals), Mick Tucker (guitars) and Toby Sadler (bass). Pearson and Tucker revived the band between 2022 and 2024.

== History ==
White Spirit, co-founded by Gers and Crallan in 1975, are considered part of the new wave of British heavy metal, although their sound was closer to that of 1970s hard rock acts such as Deep Purple or Uriah Heep. The band issued their debut single, "Backs to the Grind", on the fledgling heavy metal independent label Neat Records in 1980. It was backed with "Cheetah", which would also appear on Neat's Lead Weight compilation (and again on the retrospective New Wave of British Heavy Metal '79 Revisited double LP/CD in 1990, compiled by noted NWOBHM enthusiast Lars Ulrich of Metallica and former Kerrang! editor Geoff Barton). White Spirit featured on various other notable NWOBHM compilations such as Volume 2 of Metal for Muthas, the Muthas Pride EP, Brute Force, and 60 Minutes Plus.

With the upsurge of the NWOBHM, White Spirit moved to the MCA label on which they released their first and only album in 1980. The album was simply titled White Spirit and featured cover artwork by Michael Spaldin, who later worked on stage set design for Gillan. That same year White Spirit made an appearance at the Reading Festival. The group suffered a serious blow in 1981, when their guitarist Janick Gers accepted an offer from former Deep Purple frontman Ian Gillan, to join his solo outfit Gillan in place of Bernie Torme. Gers went on to record the albums Double Trouble and Magic, before Ian Gillan decided to dissolve the band and join Black Sabbath. Gers was also part of the short lived UK supergroup Gogmagog, also featuring former members of Def Leppard, Iron Maiden and Whitesnake, who folded after releasing a sole EP, I Will Be There, in 1985.

White Spirit bassist Phil Brady later played with the Teesside metal band Therapy from 1990 until 1991, helping them reach the semi-finals of the Battle Of The Bands competition at Rio's in Bradford in 1990. He left White Spirit after their first studio album and was replaced by Ian Shuttleworth, followed by Toby Sadler. Drummer Graeme Crallan, also known as 'Crash', joined Tank in 1984, along with Mick Tucker, and played on their Honour & Blood album. He quit the following year. Crallan died at Royal Free Hospital, Hampstead on 27 July 2008 after a fall in York Way, London.

The band's eponymous album was re-issued in 2005 on the Castle label with an entire second disc's worth of bonus material, including rarities, demos, alternate versions and takes, and B-sides. Most notable amongst these additional tracks is one entitled "Watch Out", originally found on the 60 Minutes Plus compilation in 1982, recorded after vocalist Bruce Ruff had left the band. Instead, future Ted Nugent and Bad Company singer Brian Howe contributed lead vocals. The re-issue is currently in print in Japan only, where Universal Music Japan issued the album as a re-mastered Limited Edition SHM (Super High Material technology) Mini-LP Sleeve CD in 2008. However this latest re-issue did not include various bonus tracks found on the original Castle edition.

Following the discovery of a cassette tape containing studio demos recorded in 1981 of what was to be the second White Spirit album, careful restoration took place to retrieve the original Brian Howe vocals and musical performances. This was to form the basis of a new White Spirit album, Right Or Wrong, released through Conquest Music in July 2022. Guest performers on the album included Neil Murray, Russell Gilbrook, Jeff Scott Soto, Steve Overland and Lee Small.

== Members ==
- Bruce Ruff – lead vocals (1975–1981)
- Janick Gers – guitar (1975–1981)
- Phil Brady – bass guitar (1975–1981)
- Graeme Crallan – drums (1975–1981) (Died 2008)
- Malcolm Pearson – keyboards (1975–1981, 2022–2024)
- Brian Howe – lead vocals (1981) (Died 2020)
- Mick Tucker – guitars (1981, 2022–2024)
- Ian Shuttleworth - bass guitar (1981)
- Toby Sadler - bass guitar (1981, 2023)
- Alexx Stahl - lead vocals (2022-2024)
- Russell Gilbrook - drums (2022-2024)

== Discography ==
=== Studio albums ===
- White Spirit (1980) MCA
- Right Or Wrong (2022) Conquest Music

=== Compilation appearances ===
- Metal for Muthas Volume II (1980, EMI Records) ("High Upon High")
- Muthas Pride 12" EP (1980, EMI Records) ("Red Skies")
- Brute Force (1980, MCA Records) ("Back to the Grind")
- Lead Weight LP (1981, Neat/Base Records) ("Cheetah")
- 60 Minutes Plus cassette (1982, Neat Records) ("Watch Out")
- All Hell Let Loose LP (1983, Base Records) ("Watch Out")
- Metal Minded CD (1987, Prism Entertainment) ("Watch Out")
- New Wave of British Heavy Metal '79 Revisited CD (1990, Metal Blade) ("Cheetah")

=== Singles and EPs ===
- "Backs to the Grind" b/w "Cheetah" (1980, Neat Records) (UK Indie No. 3)
- "Midnight Chaser" b/w "Suffragettes" (1980, MCA Records)
- "High Upon High" b/w "No Reprieve", "Arthur Guitar" (1980, MCA Records)

== See also ==
- List of new wave of British heavy metal bands
