= Trespass (band) =

British heavy metal band

- Origin: Sudbury, Suffolk, England
- Genres: Heavy metal
- Years active: 1978–1982, 1992–1993, 2015–present
- Labels: Trial Records; Mighty Music
- Members: Mark Sutcliffe; Joe Fawcett; Wil Wilmot; Matt Peck; Andrew Staples
- Past members: Dave Crawte; Paul Sutcliffe; Steve "Sleeve" Mills; Robert Eckland; Adrian Grimes (AKA Adrian Lynden); Richard Penny; Cris Linscott; Bob Irving; Leo Smee; James Last; Paul Martin; Dan Biggin; Nigel Booth; Jason Roberts

Trespass are a British heavy metal band from Sudbury, Suffolk, England. They were part of the new wave of British heavy metal at the beginning of the 1980s. The band reformed in 2015.

== Career ==
=== Lineup ===
Initially the band consisted of brothers Mark Sutcliffe (voice and guitar) and Paul Sutcliffe (drums), Dave Crawte (guitar), and Richard Penny (bass). Later they replaced Richard Penny with Cris Linscott and added vocalist Steve "Sleeve" Mills, all under 21 at the time. They all had day jobs, as the band never became financially viable: "Sleeve" was employed by the Social Security Dapartment, Mark and Paul worked at a factory, Dave worked at a record shop, and Cris was an income tax collector. The band's manager was Steve Kendall.

Mark Sutcliffe cites as a musical influence Ritchie Blackmore of Deep Purple fame, Cris Linscott admired Lynyrd Skynyrd and Rush, while "Sleeve" liked David Coverdale and Paul Rodgers.

=== Trial Records ===
The band came to sign with Trial Records and their first single, "One of These Days", had a pressing of only 2000 copies, which were sold out in a short time. After that they enlisted vocalist Rob Eckland to record their "Jealousy" / "Live It Up" single, which was a double A-side. The final release for the label was the Bright Lights EP which also had a pressing of 2000 copies. The A-side ran at 45 RPM but the B-side ran at 33⅓ RPM.

=== The Enid and Lodge Studios ===
In 1982, the band were represented for a brief period by Lester Mortimer, the manager for British pomp rock band The Enid. Lead vocalist Adrian Grimes (AKA Adrian Lynden) joined them for the recording of a six-track demo, produced by Steven Stewart at The Enid's The Lodge Recording Studio. Some of these tracks were included on One Of These Days: The Anthology. The band played a few gigs with this line-up (the biggest being the Quay Theatre in Sudbury, Suffolk), but disbanded after a family tragedy.

=== Other releases ===
The band recorded a session for Tommy Vance's Friday Rock Show, which secured them an inclusion in Metal Explosion, a BBC compilation record.

They also managed to have two of their songs included in the second volume of the Metal For Muthas compilation series.

In 1990, Lars Ulrich, the drummer and co-founder of the band Metallica, released a compilation entitled NWOBHM '79 Revisited celebrating the tenth anniversary of the new wave of British heavy metal. The double-CD includes some of the top acts of the time, with Trespass being represented with their biggest hit "One of These Days" from the BBC session.

=== Hiatus ===
After Trespass's break-up, the long-term members of the band (Mark, Paul, and Dave) formed a glam metal band Blue Blud (later Blue Blood), releasing two albums: The Big Noise (1989) and Universal Language (1991). After Blue Blood's break-up in 1992, the brothers revived the Trespass name and released an album of original material in 1993, Head.

Various compilations of released and unreleased material have been issued during the years, both officially by the band and in unofficial bootlegs. Some of these include: Through the Ages, The Works, The Works 2, and One Of These Days: The Trespass Anthology.

=== Reformation ===
Trespass started to reform in 2013 into 2014 when they entered the studio once more to re-record their classic material, so it had a consistent sound and feel. The band launched an official Trespass Facebook page in December 2013. In 2014, Paul Sutcliffe decided he wanted to pursue other musical avenues so the remaining members of the band, Mark Sutcliffe and Dave Crawte, recruited James Last on drums, Paul Martin on guitars and Dan Biggin (AKA Danny B, who engineered the new album) on bass.

The band's new line-up debuted at the Brofest No. 3 festival in Newcastle upon Tyne, England, on 28 February 2015. The new eponymously titled album and accompanying website were launched in March 2015.

Crawte and Martin left the band in January 2016. A new drummer Jason Roberts and lead guitarist Joe Fawcett joined Mark Sutcliffe and Danny B, signalling a return to the original Trespass twin lead guitar sound. An album of new material, entitled Footprints in the Rock was released in late 2016. Nigel Booth joined the band as bassist in 2018.

In 2020 Wil Wilmot replaced Nigel Booth as bassist. On 27 January 2023 they released a digital single, "Blackthorn" as a taster for a new album, followed by further singles "Daggers Drawn" on 17 March and "Live Like A King" on 28 April. The album, "Wolf At The Door" was released on 26 May, featuring artwork by the English illustrator Mark Wilkinson, who has also provided album cover artwork for Iron Maiden, Judas Priest, Marillion and The Darkness, amongst others.

Although the COVID-19 pandemic and subsequent lockdowns initially curtailed any live work, the new lineup of the band eventually made its live debut at the Wedfest Rocks 7 festival at Club 85 in Hitchin, UK on April 9, 2022, on a bill that also featured other NWOBHM stablemates such as Thunderstick and Elixir. The band have since played numerous festivals and gigs in both the UK and Europe, including Up the Hammers festival in Greece and Keep It True and Headbangers Open Air festivals in Germany.

In 2025 the band recruited Matt Peck on drums.

In 2026 the lineup of the band changed again when bassist Wil Wilmot moved to lead vocals, and was replaced on four-string duties by Andrew Staples.

== Recording sessions ==
1979, October - Hillside Studios

1. "One of these days" (released as the A-side of the single "One of these days")
2. "Bloody moon" (released as the B-side of the single "One of these days")
3. "Frogeye"
4. "Bombay mix"
5. "Ace of spades"

1980, February - Spaceward Studios

1. "8 'til 5"
2. "Stormchild" (released on the compilation album Metal For Muthas, Volume 2: Cut Loud)
3. "Lightsmith"
4. "One of these days" (released on the compilation album Metal For Muthas, Volume 2: Cut Loud)

1980, April - EMI Studios

1. "Live it up"
2. "Change your mind"
3. "Visionary"
4. "Assassin"

1980, 2 May - BBC Studios

(the Friday Rock Show session)

1. "One of these days"
2. "Stormchild"
3. "Live it up"
4. "Visionary" (released on the compilation album Metal Explosion)

1980, August - Spaceward Studios

1. "Live it up" (released as the A-side of the single "Jealousy")
2. "Jealousy" (released as the A-side of the single "Jealousy")

1981, March - Hillside Studios

1. "Bounty hunter"
2. "Point of no return"
3. "Vendetta"

1981, July - RG Jones Recording Studios

1. "Bright lights" (released as the A-side of the EP "Bright lights")
2. "Duel" (released as the first B-side of the EP "Bright lights")
3. "Man and machine" (released as the second B-side of the EP "Bright lights")
4. "Life beat"
5. "It's all over"

1982, May - The Lodge Studios

1. "Make it metal"
2. "Rockin' on the radio"
3. "Midnight hour"

1982, November - The Lodge Studios

1. "Long way to Hollywood"
2. "Rockin' the hard way"
3. "Hot on your heels"

2014 various - recorded at Long Track studios mixed at HVR Studios

1. "Stormchild"
2. "Assassin"
3. "Ace of Spades"
4. "Eight til Five"
5. "Bloody Moon"
6. "One of these Days"
7. "Live it Up"
8. "Jealousy"
9. "The Duel"
10. "Lightsmith"

2016 various- recorded and mixed at HVR Studios, engineered by Dan Biggin

1. "Momentum"
2. "Be Brave"
3. "Mighty Love"
4. "Prometheus"
5. "Footprints In The Rock"
6. "Beowulf & Grendel"
7. "The Green Man"
8. "Dragons In The Mist"
9. "Little Star"
10. "Music Of The Waves"
11. "Weed"

2021 & 2022 various- recorded and mixed at Crooks Hall Studio, engineered by John Metcalfe

1. "Blackthorn"
2. "Daggers Drawn"
3. "Force of Nature"
4. "Other Worlds"
5. "Ghost Pilot"
6. "Back To The Woods"
7. "Crooked Cross"
8. "Unsinkable"
9. "Stranger In Paradise"
10. "Live Like A King"
11. "Wolf At The Door"

== See also ==
- List of new wave of British heavy metal bands
