= War Nation =

Studio album by Tank
- Released: 5 June 2012
- Genre: Heavy metal
- Label: Metal Mind Productions
- Producer: Phil Kinman

Tank chronology
War Machine (2010)	War Nation (2012)	Breath of the Pit (2013)

Tucker/Evans Tank chronology
War Machine (2010)	War Nation (2012)	Valley of Tears (2015)

War Nation is the second studio album by the Tucker/Evans Tank (eighth if counting the albums by the original Tank), released through Metal Mind Productions on 5 June 2012.

== Reception ==
Since its release, this album has been met with mostly positive reviews from critics. Music Enthusiast Magazine wrote: "When it comes to such nearly perfectionistic records, I hate to generalize. But overall, War Nation is a simply incredible album, even though there’s nothing simplistic about it".

== Track listing ==
No.	Title	Length
1.	"War Nation"	6:10
2.	"Song of the Dead"	5:06
3.	"Hammer and Nails"	4:54
4.	"Don't Dream in the Dark"	4:53
5.	"Grace of God"	4:54
6.	"Dreamer"	5:25
7.	"Justice for All"	4:16
8.	"Wings of Heaven"	5:32
9.	"State of the Union"	3:59
10.	"Hard Road"	3:52

== Personnel ==
Tank

- Doogie White – vocals
- Cliff Evans – guitar
- Mick Tucker – guitar
- Chris Dale – bass
- Steve Hopgood – drums
