= Filth Hounds of Hades =

Studio album by Tank
- Released: March 1982
- Recorded: December 1981 – January 1982
- Studio: Ramport Studios, London
- Genre: Heavy metal, speed metal
- Length: 38:25
- Label: Kamaflage (UK), Attic (Canada)
- Producer: Eddie Clarke

Tank chronology
Filth Hounds of Hades (1982)	Power of the Hunter (1982)

Singles from Filth Hounds of Hades
- 1. "Turn Your Head Around" / "Steppin' on a Landmine" Released: 1982

Professional ratings
Review scores
Source	Rating
AllMusic	4.5/5 stars
Collector's Guide to Heavy Metal	8/10

Filth Hounds of Hades is the debut studio album by English heavy metal band Tank, released in March 1982 on the Kamaflage label.

The album was produced by "Fast" Eddie Clarke of Motörhead, and recorded between December 1981 and January 1982 at Ramport Studios in London. The Canadian pressing on Attic Records had an alternate blue cover with the dogs in maroon and with a different logo. This was also used on the 2023 remastered LP reissue on High Roller Records. The European (except Germany and the Netherlands) and Australian releases featured a dark blue cover with black dogs, while the Dutch one had a light blue cover and retained the black dogs. The German cover had a black cover and black dogs.

The title came from Viv Stanshall's Sir Henry at Rawlinson End, originally a radio series recorded for the John Peel show in 1975, and later a 1978 album and 1980 film:

"Filth hounds of Hades!: Sir Henry Rawlinson surfaced from the blackness, hot and fidgety, fuss, bother and itch, conscious mind coming up too fast for the bends, through pack-ice thrubbing seas, boom-sounders, blow-holes, harsh-croak Blind Pews tip-tap-tocking for escape from his pressing skull...."

In an interview with Sounds, drummer Mark Brabbs said that "It came from Viv Stanshall's book and it just sounded apt 'cos we all like his humour. It just seemed to describe the sort of people who came to see us when we first started they were the same as us, just having a party, starting drinking each day at lunchtime, so it seemed apt, 'cos we called them The Filth even then, though not in a derogatory way!"

Danish Thrash Metal band Artillery named their band after the song “Heavy Artillery”

== Track listing ==
All music is composed by Mark Brabbs, Peter Brabbs, and Algy Ward.

Side one
No.	Title	Length
1.	"Shellshock"	3:10
2.	"Struck by Lightning"	3:10
3.	"Run Like Hell"	3:40
4.	"Blood, Guts, and Beer"	3:42
5.	"That's What Dreams Are Made Of"	5:32

Side two
No.	Title	Length
6.	"Turn Your Head Around"	3:25
7.	"Heavy Artillery"	3:28
8.	"Who Needs Love Songs"	3:06
9.	"Filth Hounds of Hades"	3:56
10.	"(He Fell in Love with a) Stormtrooper"	5:17
Total length:		38:25

2022 Remastered Bonus Tracks
No.	Title	Length
11.	"The Snake" (Pink Fairies cover)	3:34
12.	"Steppin' on a Landmine"	4:14
13.	"Don't Walk Away"	3:07
14.	"Shellshock" (Alt. version)	2:21
15.	"Hammer On" (Alt. version)	4:11
16.	"Run like Hell" (Demo)	4:10
17.	"Blood, Guts and Beer" (Live)	4:00
18.	"Don't Walk Away" (Live)	4:57
19.	"The Snake" (Live)	3:33
20.	"(He Fell in Love With a) Stormtrooper" (Alt. version)	5:53
Total length:		78:08

== Personnel ==
Tank

- Algy Ward – vocals, bass
- Peter Brabbs – guitar
- Mark Brabbs – drums

Production

- "Fast" Eddie Clarke – producer
- Will Reid Dick – engineer
- Neil Hornby – tape operator
