= Power of the Hunter =

Studio album by Tank
- Released: October 1982
- Recorded: June–July 1982
- Studio: Surrey Sound, Leatherhead
- Genre: Heavy metal, speed metal
- Length: 40:24
- Label: Kamaflage
- Producer: Nigel Gray

Tank chronology
Filth Hounds of Hades (1982)	Power of the Hunter (1982)	This Means War (1983)

Singles from Power of the Hunter
- 1. "Crazy Horses" / "Filth Bitch Boogie" Released: 1982

Professional ratings
Review scores
Source	Rating
AllMusic	2.5/5 stars
Collector's Guide to Heavy Metal	9/10
Sounds	4.5/5 stars

Power of the Hunter is the second album by heavy metal band Tank, released in 1982. The album was produced by Nigel Gray, better known for his work with The Police. "Crazy Horses" is a cover of the 1972 hit by The Osmonds.

== Track listing ==
All songs written by Tank, except where noted.

Side one

1. "Walking Barefoot over Glass" – 5:31
2. "Pure Hatred" – 3:51
3. "Biting and Scratching" – 4:41
4. "Some Came Running" – 3:03
5. "T.A.N.K." – 3:51

Side two

6. "Used Leather (Hanging Loose)" – 4:21
7. "Crazy Horses" (Alan Osmond, Wayne Osmond, Merrill Osmond) – 2:52
8. "Set Your Back on Fire" – 3:57
9. "Red Skull Rock" – 4:07
10. "Power of the Hunter" – 4:10

CD edition bonus tracks

Since 2007, editions of the album have been available on CD with the following bonus tracks:

11. "Oh, What a Beautiful Morning" (Richard Rodgers, Oscar Hammerstein II) – 0:51
12. "Crazy Horses" (Osmond, Osmond, Osmond) (single version) – 2:30
13. "Filth Bitch Boogie" (B-Side of "Crazy Horses" single) – 4:27

== Personnel ==
Tank

- Algy Ward – vocals, bass
- Peter Brabbs – guitar
- Mark Brabbs – drums

Production

- Nigel Gray – producer, engineer
- Jim Ebdon – assistant engineer
