= Honour & Blood =

Studio album by Tank
- Released: July 1984
- Recorded: 1984
- Studio: Sound Suite Studios, London, UK
- Genre: Heavy metal
- Length: 42:43
- Label: Music for Nations
- Producer: Tank

Tank chronology
This Means War (1983)	Honour & Blood (1984)	Tank (1987)

Professional ratings
Review scores
Source	Rating
AllMusic	3/5 stars
Collector's Guide to Heavy Metal	7/10

Honour & Blood is the fourth album by the English heavy metal band Tank, released in 1984. By the time of this album Algy Ward was the last original member of the group remaining, as the Brabbs brothers had been replaced by Cliff Evans on guitar and Graeme Crallan on drums (reuniting Crallan with his former bandmate in White Spirit, Mick Tucker). The album follows much the same format as the band's previous album This Means War, with seven songs, several quite lengthy, of melodic heavy metal primarily about the topic of war. However, the band explores some different subject matter on side two, as "W.M.L.A." and "Too Tired to Wait for Love", express frustration in love, while "Chain of Fools" is a cover of the 1967 hit by Aretha Franklin.

== Track listing ==
All songs written by Algy Ward and Mick Tucker except where noted.

Side one

1. "The War Drags Ever On" – 8:14
2. "When All Hell Freezes Over" – 5:56
3. "Honour and Blood" – 6:31

Side two

4. "Chain of Fools" (Don Covay) – 4:08
5. "W.M.L.A. (Wasting My Life Away)" – 5:17
6. "Too Tired to Wait for Love" (Algy Ward) – 4:37
7. "Kill" – 8:00

CD edition bonus track

Various editions of the album have been available on CD with the following bonus track:

8. "The Man Who Never Was" ("Echoes of a Distant Battle" B-side) – 4:30

== Personnel ==
Tank

- Algy Ward – vocals, bass, keyboards
- Cliff Evans – guitar
- Mick Tucker – guitar
- Graeme Crallan – drums

Production

- Alvin Clark, Peter Rackham – engineers
