= New wave of British heavy metal =

Heavy metal movement (1970s–1980s)

- Stylistic origins: Heavy metal; hard rock; pub rock; progressive rock
- Cultural origins: Mid-to-late 1970s, United Kingdom
- Derivative forms: Black metal; glam metal; power metal; speed metal; thrash metal

Fusion genres
- UK 82

Regional scenes
- United Kingdom

Other topics
- Extreme metal; first-wave black metal; NWOAHM; progressive metal; punk rock; NWOTHM

The new wave of British heavy metal (often abbreviated as NWOBHM) was a nationwide musical movement that began in England in the mid-1970s and achieved international attention by the early 1980s. Editor Alan Lewis coined the term for an article by Geoff Barton in a May 1979 issue of the British music newspaper Sounds to describe the emergence of heavy metal bands in the mid-to-late 1970s, as punk rock declined amid the dominance of new wave music.

Although it encompasses diverse styles inherited from rock music, the music of the NWOBHM is best remembered for infusing early heavy metal with the intensity of punk rock, producing fast, aggressive songs. The DIY attitude of the NWOBHM bands led to raw-sounding, self-produced recordings and a proliferation of independent record labels. Song lyrics were usually about escapist themes, such as mythology, fantasy, horror, and the rock 'n' roll lifestyle.

The NWOBHM began as an underground phenomenon growing in parallel to punk and largely ignored by the media. Promotion by Sounds and rock DJ Neal Kay moved it into public consciousness and toward radio airplay, recognition, and success in the UK. Its musicians and fans were largely young, white, working-class men who suffered the hardships of unemployment after the 1973–75 recession. As a reaction to their bleak reality, they then created a community separate from mainstream society to enjoy each other's company and their favourite loud music. The NWOBHM was criticised as being local media hype for mostly talentless musicians. Nonetheless, it generated a renewal in the genre of heavy metal music and furthered the progress of the heavy metal subculture, whose updated behavioural and visual codes were quickly adopted by metal fans worldwide after the spread of the music to continental Europe, North America and Japan.

By some estimates, the movement spawned as many as a thousand heavy metal bands. Only a few survived the advent of MTV and the rise of the more commercial glam metal in the second half of the 1980s. Iron Maiden and Def Leppard became superstars; Motörhead and Saxon also had considerable success. Other groups, such as Diamond Head, Venom, and Raven, had more limited chart success but influenced the successful extreme metal subgenres of the mid-to-late 1980s and 1990s. Many bands from the NWOBHM reunited in the 2000s and remained active through live performances and new studio albums.

== Background ==
=== Social unrest ===
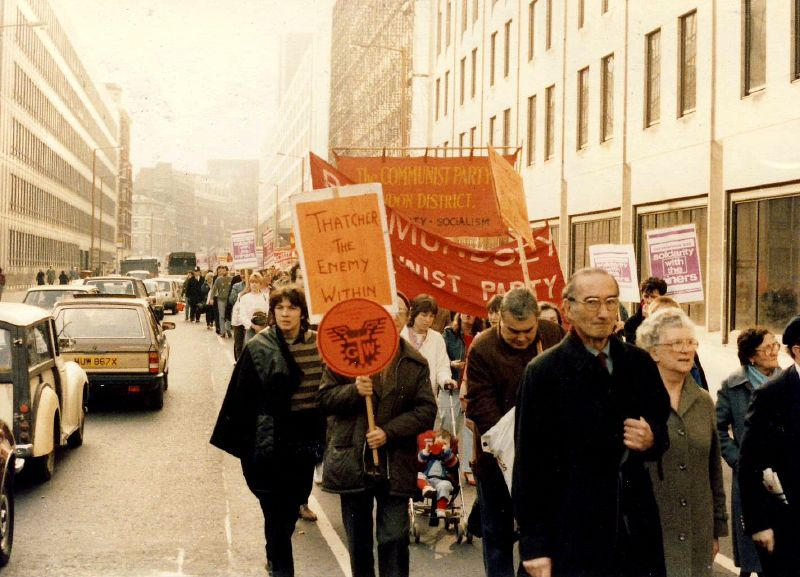
A miners' strike rally in 1984

In the second half of the 1970s, the United Kingdom was in a state of social unrest and widespread poverty as a result of the ineffective social politics of both Conservative and Labour Party governments during a three-year period of economic recession. As a consequence of deindustrialisation, the unemployment rate was exceptionally high, especially among working class youth. It continued to rise in the early 1980s, peaking in February 1983. The discontent of so many people caused social unrest with frequent strikes, and culminated in a series of riots, including one in Brixton and another in Toxteth. During this period, the mass of young people, deprived of the prospect of even relatively low-skill jobs that were available to the previous generations, searched for different ways to earn money in the music and entertainment businesses. The explosion of new bands and new musical styles coming from the UK in the late 1970s was a result of their efforts to make a living in the economic depression that hit the country before and during the governments of Prime Minister Margaret Thatcher.

The desperation and the violent reaction of a generation robbed of a safe future are well-represented by the British punk movement of 1977–1978, whose rebellion against the establishment continued diluted in the new wave and post-punk music of the 1980s. These self-proclaimed punks were politically militant, relishing their anarchic attitude and stage practices like pogo dancing. They wore short and spiked hairstyles or shaved heads, often with safety pins and ripped clothes, and considered musical prowess unimportant as long as the music was simple and loud. However, not all working-class male youths embraced the punk movement; some preferred to escape from their grim reality in heavy metal, which was equally effective in providing fun, stress relief, and peer companionship, otherwise denied because of their unemployment.

=== Heavy rock in the UK ===
The UK was a cradle of the first wave of heavy metal, which was born at the end of the 1960s and flowered in the early 1970s. Of the many British bands that came to prominence during that period, Led Zeppelin, Black Sabbath and Deep Purple achieved worldwide success and critical acclaim. The success of the music genre, usually called heavy rock at the time, generated a community of UK fans with strong ties to psychedelia, hippie doctrines and biker subculture. Each of these bands was in crisis in the mid-to-late 1970s: Led Zeppelin were plagued by discord and personal tragedies and had drastically reduced their activities, Black Sabbath had fired their charismatic but unreliable frontman Ozzy Osbourne, and Deep Purple disbanded. As a consequence, the whole movement lost much of its momentum and media interest, which were refocused on what British writer Malc Macmillan calls "the more fashionable or lucrative markets of the day" such as disco, glam, mod revival, new wave and electronic music. Just like progressive rock acts and other mainstream music groups of the 1970s, heavy rock bands were viewed as, in the words of journalist Garry Bushell, "lumbering dinosaurs" by a music press infatuated with punk rock and new wave. Some writers even declared the premature demise of heavy metal altogether.

The crisis of British heavy rock giants left space for the rise of other rock bands in the mid-1970s, including Queen, Hawkwind, Budgie, Bad Company, Status Quo and Nazareth, all of which had multiple chart entries in the UK and had conducted successful international tours. The British chart results of the period show that there was still a vast audience for heavy metal in the country, and upcoming bands UFO and Judas Priest, also had tangible success and media coverage in the late 1970s. Foreign hard rock acts, such as Blue Öyster Cult and Kiss from the US, Rush from Canada, Scorpions from West Germany, Thin Lizzy from Ireland, and especially AC/DC from Australia, climbed the British charts in the same period.

=== Motörhead ===
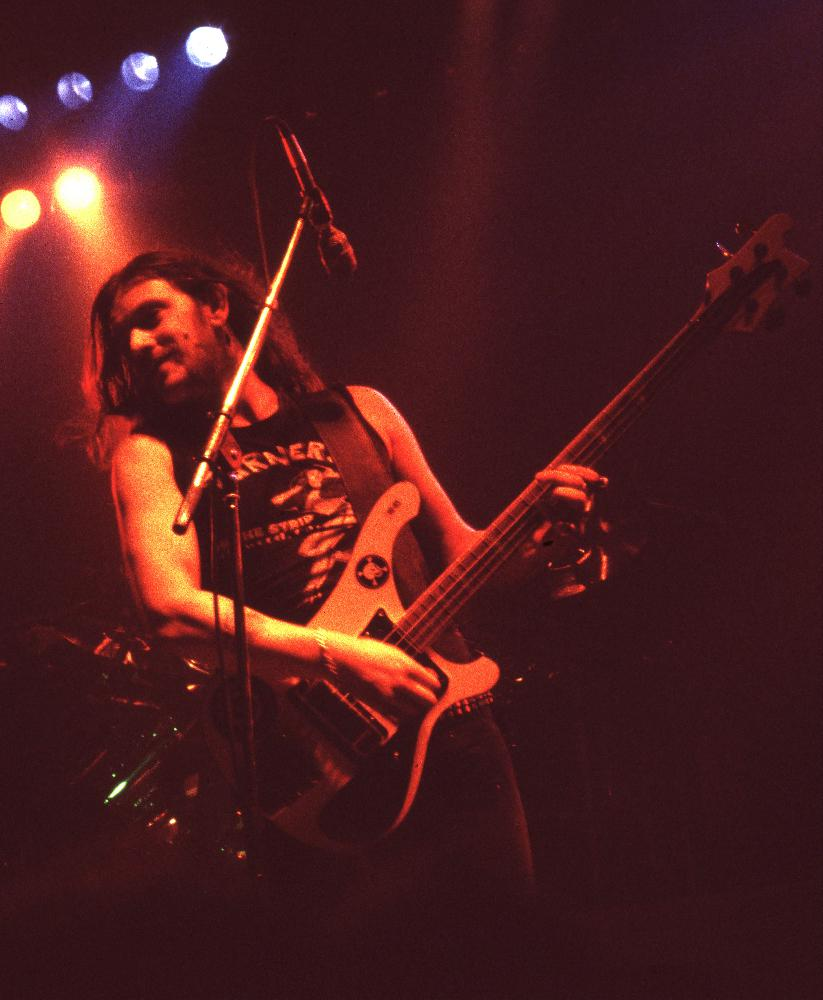
Ian "Lemmy" Kilmister of Motörhead was a reference figure for the whole movement.

Motörhead were founded in 1975 by already experienced musicians. Their leader Ian "Lemmy" Kilmister was a former member of the space rock band Hawkwind, Larry Wallis had played with Pink Fairies, and Eddie Clarke had been a member of Curtis Knight's Zeus. Their previous experience is one element which divides critics and fans over whether the band belongs to the new wave of British heavy metal. Some believe that the band should be considered an inspiration for the movement, but not part of it, because they had signed recording contracts, toured the country, and had chart success before any NWOBHM band had stepped out of their local club scene. Motörhead were also the only metal band of the period recording songs with veteran BBC radio DJ John Peel for his Peel Sessions programme and the first to reach No. 1 in the UK Albums Chart with the live album No Sleep 'til Hammersmith in June 1981. Lemmy himself said, "the NWOBHM ... didn't do us much good", because Motörhead "came along a bit too early for it".

Other critics view Motörhead as the first significant exponent of the movement and the first band to fully implement a crossover between punk rock and heavy metal. Their fast music, the renunciation of technical virtuosity in favour of sheer loudness, and their uncompromising attitude were welcomed equally by punks and heavy metal fans. Motörhead were supported by many NWOBHM bands on tour, and they also shared the stage with Lemmy's friends' punk band The Damned. Motörhead's musical style became very popular during the NWOBHM, making them a fundamental reference for the nascent movement and for musicians of various metal subgenres in the following decades.

== Characteristics ==
=== Identity and style ===
The NWOBHM involved both musicians and fans who were largely young, male and white and shared class origin, ethics, and aesthetic values. American sociologist Deena Weinstein, in her book Heavy Metal: The Music and Its Culture, describes the rise and growth of the movement as the achievement of maturity for heavy metal, after its birth in the early 1970s and before branching out into various subgenres in the following years. British heavy metal fans, commonly known as muthas, metalheads, or headbangers for the violent, rhythmic shaking of their heads in time to the music, dismissed the simplistic image of rebellious youth inherited from the counterculture of the 1960s and the psychedelic attachments characteristic of heavy rock in the 1970s, updating the shared principles and codes of the heavy metal subculture and definitely separating it from mainstream society.

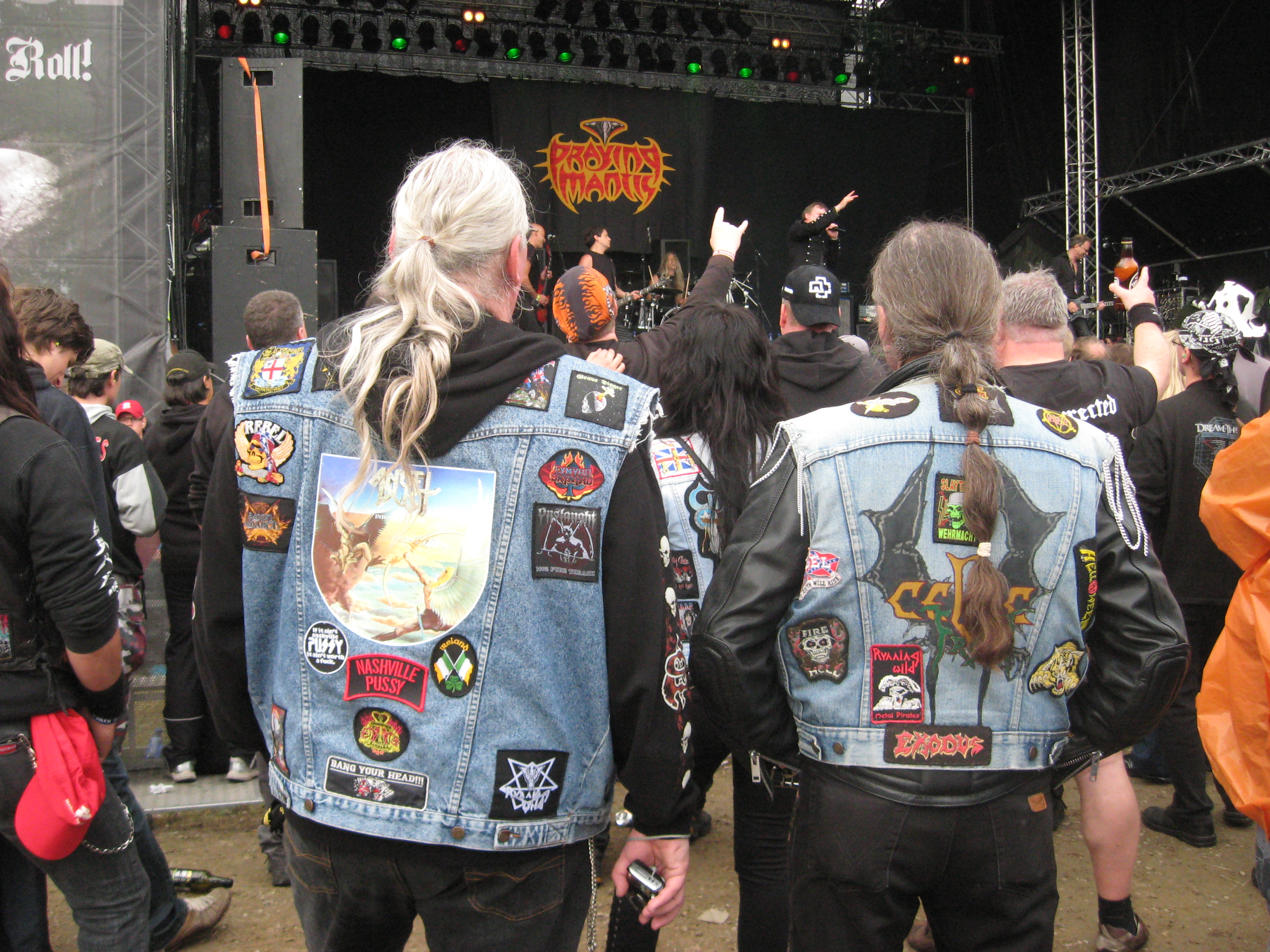
Patches with band logos and cover art usually sewn on denim jackets were introduced during the NWOBHM and are still common among metalheads.

Towards the end of the 1970s, British metalheads coalesced into a closed community of peers that exalted power and celebrated masculinity. According to Deena Weinstein's analysis, their male camaraderie and the general absence of women in their ranks did not turn into machismo and misogyny. In the same article, she wrote that British heavy metal: "is not racist, despite its uniformly white performers, and its lyrics are devoid of racial references." Another characteristic of the subculture was its latent homophobia, less violent, but not dissimilar to British skinheads' disposition; in his book Running with the Devil: Power, Gender and Madness in Heavy Metal Music, Robert Walser calls it a "collective affirmation of heterosexuality", and in a journal British sociologist John Clarke regards it as "a reaction against the erosion of traditionally available stereotypes of masculinity".

Headbangers showed little interest in political and social problems, finding in each other's company, in the consumption of beer and in the music, the means to escape their bleak reality; for this reason they were often accused of nihilism or escapism. In contrast with punks, they loved musicianship and made idols of virtuoso guitarists and vocalists, viewing the live show as the full realisation of their status. The fans were very loyal to the music, to each other and to the bands with whom they shared origins and from whom they required coherence with their values, authenticity and continuous accessibility. To depart from this strict code meant being marked as a "sell out" or "poseur" and being somewhat excluded from the community. The lyrics of the song "Denim and Leather" by Saxon reflect precisely the condition of British metalheads in those years of great enthusiasm. Access to this male-dominated world for female musicians and fans was not easy, and only women who adapted to their male counterparts' standards and codes were accepted, as attested by Girlschool and Rock Goddess, the only notable all-female heavy metal bands of that era.

Saxon – "Denim and Leather" (1981)
"Denim and Leather" is an anthem which celebrates the NWOBHM movement and its members.

The music, philosophy and lifestyle of heavy metal bands and fans were often panned by both left-wing critics and conservative public opinion, described as senseless, ridiculous to the limit of self-parody, and even dangerous for the young generation. The 1984 mockumentary This Is Spinal Tap addressed many idiosyncrasies of British metal bands, showing comic sides of that world which external observers would judge absurd, but many metal musicians regarded the movie's content as all too real.

=== Visual aspects ===
The dress code of the British headbangers reflected the newly found cohesion of the movement and recalled the look of 1960s rockers and American bikers. The common elements were long hair and jeans, black or white T-shirts with band logos and cover art and leather jackets or denim vests adorned with patches. Following the example of Judas Priest, elements of S&M fashion entered the metal wardrobe of the 1980s and it became typical to show off metallic studs and ornaments, or for metal musicians to wear spandex or leather trousers. Elements of militaria, such as bullet belts and insignia, were also introduced at this time. This style of dress quickly became the uniform of metalheads worldwide.

Most bands of the NWOBHM had the same look as their fans and produced rock shows without special visual effects. A notable exception was Iron Maiden, which created the grisly character Eddie the Head as a stage prop to enrich their performances very early in their career. Other exceptions were Demon, Cloven Hoof and Samson, which used various props, costumes and tricks in their shows, while Pagan Altar and Venom became well known for their elaborate scenography inspired by shock rock and Satanism.

=== Musical and lyrical elements ===
The NWOBHM – comprising bands with very different influences and styles – was promoted as both a movement and a distinct music genre only in its formative years during the mid-to-late 1970s. Especially in those early years, what characterised the flood of new music was its raw sound, due in large part to low-budget productions, but also to the amateurish talents of many young bands. Those young musicians were also linked by a shared inspiration from the works of the aforementioned successful heavy rock bands of the late 1960s and 1970s, and kept a sort of continuity with the earlier acts, whose music had temporarily gone out of fashion, but was still thriving underground. However, the media of the 1980s and the promotional literature of record labels typically placed rock music that employed loud guitars, but was not classifiable as "punk" under the blanket term "heavy metal", subsuming the entire spectrum of NWOBHM bands within a single music genre.

Following a largely organic and uncalculated impulse, many of these new bands infused classic heavy metal with the immediacy of pub rock and the intensity of punk rock, implementing to various degrees the crossover of genres started by Motörhead; in general they shunned ballads, de-emphasised harmonies and produced shorter songs with fast tempos and a very aggressive sound based on riffs and power chords, featuring vocals ranging from high pitched wails to gruff and low growls. Iron Maiden, Angel Witch, Saxon, Holocaust, Tygers of Pan Tang, Girlschool, Tank and More are notable performers of this style, which bands such as Atomkraft, Jaguar, Raven and Venom stretched to produce even more extreme results. Critics consider this new approach to heavy metal the greatest musical accomplishment of the NWOBHM and an important evolutionary step for the genre.

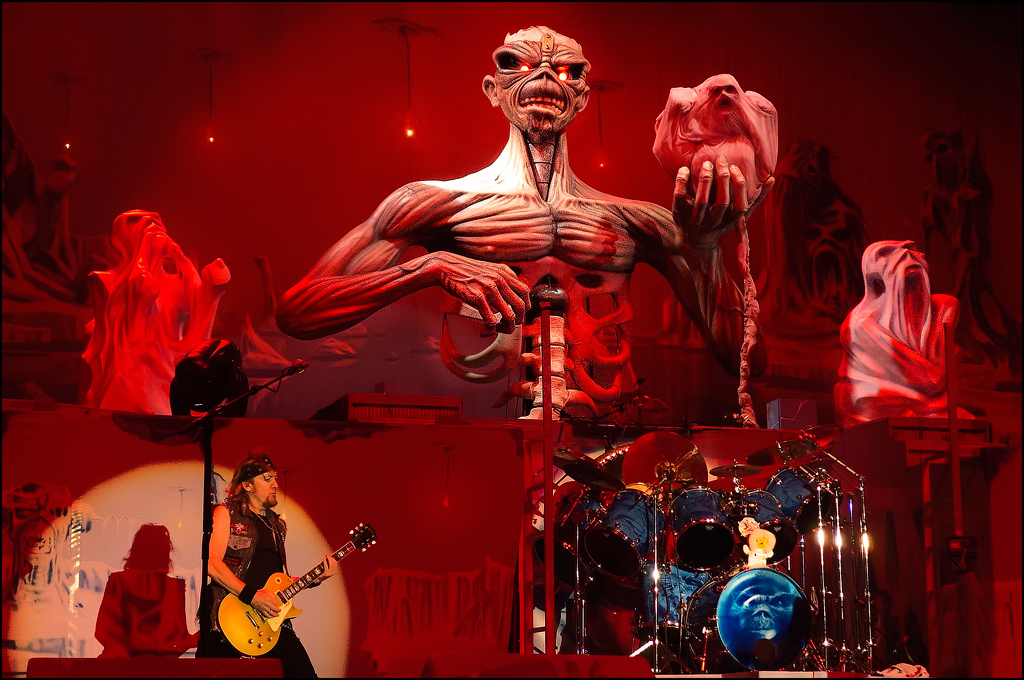
Iron Maiden's Eddie in a horror/sci-fi setting. Horror and science fiction were recurring themes in both lyrics, show scenography and cover art for NWOBHM bands.

A style more melodic and more akin to the hard rock of bands like Rainbow, Magnum, UFO, Thin Lizzy and Whitesnake was equally represented during the NWOBHM. The music of Def Leppard, Praying Mantis, White Spirit, Demon, Shy, Gaskin, Dedringer and many others, contained hooks as much as riffs, often retained a closer link with blues rock, included power ballads and featured keyboards, acoustic instruments and melodic and soaring vocals. After the peak of the movement in 1981, this style was favoured by the media and gained greater acceptance among the British audience; it became prevalent when bands usually playing the more aggressive style of metal adapted to the more popular sound, which resembled that of mainstream American acts. These changes in musical direction disoriented some fans and led them to reject those bands which were perceived as having compromised key elements of their musical identity in the pursuit of success.

These two styles do not exhaust all of the musical influences found in the British heavy metal music of the early 1980s, because many bands were also inspired by progressive rock (Iron Maiden, Diamond Head, Blitzkrieg, Demon, Saracen, Shiva, Witchfynde), boogie rock (Saxon, Vardis, Spider, Le Griffe) and glam rock (Girl, Wrathchild). Doom metal bands Pagan Altar and Witchfinder General were also part of the NWOBHM and their albums are considered among the best examples of that already established subgenre.

British writer John Tucker writes that NWOBHM bands were in general fuelled by their first experiences with adult life and "their lyrics rolled everything into one big youthful fantasy". They usually avoided social and political themes in their lyrics, or treated them in a shallow "street-level" way, preferring topics from mythology, the occult, fantasy, science fiction and horror films. Songs about romance and lust were rare, but the frequent lyrics about male bonding and the rock lifestyle contain many sexist allusions. Christian symbolism is often present in the lyrics and cover art, as is the figure of Satan, used more as a shocking and macabre subject than as the antireligious device of 1990s' black metal subculture.

== History ==
=== Underground movement (1975–1978) ===
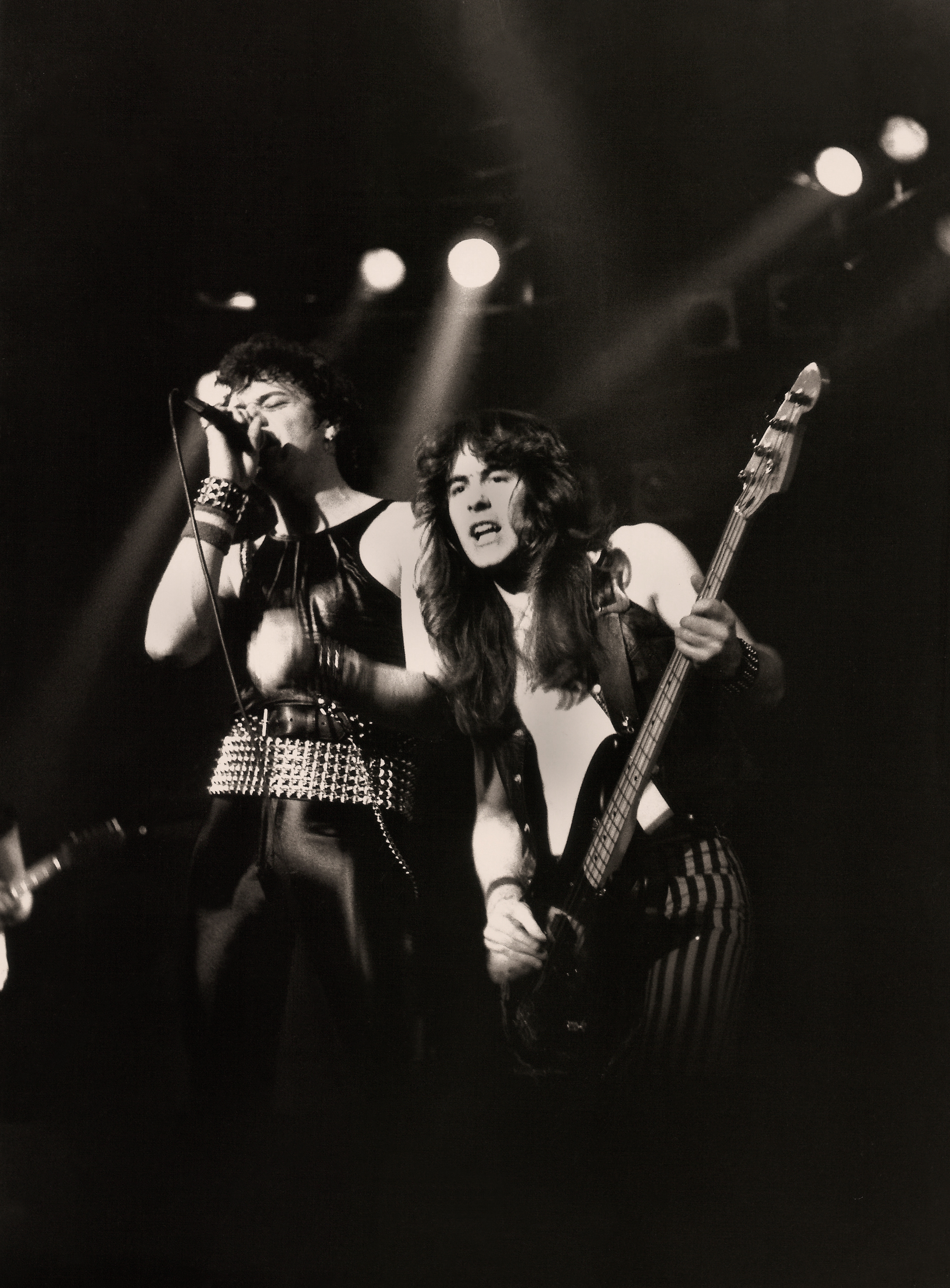
Paul Di'Anno and Steve Harris of Iron Maiden. Di'Anno's appearance and personality made him look more like a punk singer than a metalhead.

Popular heavy rock bands such as Thin Lizzy, UFO and Judas Priest were already major successes and playing international arenas, when new heavy metal bands, composed of younger people, debuted in small venues in many cities in the UK. The country's larger venues were usually reserved for chart-topping disco music, because their use as rock music clubs was considered less profitable. Like most British bands in the past, the new groups spent their formative years playing live in clubs, pubs, dance halls and social circles for low wages; this training honed their skills, created a dedicated local fan base and enabled them to come in contact with managers and record label agents.

Angel Witch, Iron Maiden, Praying Mantis and Samson from London, Son of a Bitch (later Saxon) from Barnsley, Diamond Head from Stourbridge, Marseille from Liverpool, White Spirit from Hartlepool, Witchfynde from Derbyshire, Vardis from Wakefield, Def Leppard from Sheffield, Raven and Tygers of Pan Tang from around Newcastle, and Holocaust from Edinburgh were the most important metal bands founded between 1975 and 1977 that animated the club scene in their respective cities and towns. The first bands of the newborn musical movement competed for space in venues with punk outfits, often causing clubs to specialise, presenting only punk or only rock and hard rock. Differences in ideology, attitude and looks also caused heated rivalries between the two audiences. What punk and NWOBHM musicians had in common was their "do-it-yourself" attitude toward the music business and the consequent practice of self-production and self-distribution of recorded material in the form of audio cassette demos, or privately pressed singles, aimed initially at local supporters.

It also led to the birth and diffusion of small independent record labels, often an extension of record shops and independent recording studios, which sometimes produced both punk and metal releases. Indie labels are considered important to the movement's evolution, because they removed the intrusion of corporate business which had hindered rock music in the late 1970s, giving local bands the chance to experiment with more extreme forms of music.

NWOBHM was a fiction, really, an invention of Geoff Barton and Sounds. It was a cunning ruse to boost circulation. Having said that, it did represent a lot of bands that were utterly ignored by the mainstream media. Because of that it became real and people got behind it.

— Bruce Dickinson

While British and international media covered punk intensively, the new grassroots metal movement remained underground until 1978, largely ignored by popular music magazines such as New Musical Express, The Face and Melody Maker and by radio stations. News about the bands and music circulated by word-of-mouth and fanzines, or through interested DJs, who travelled the country from club to club. Neal Kay was one of those DJs; he started to work in 1975 at a disco club called The Bandwagon in Kingsbury, North West London, housed in the back-room of the Prince of Wales pub and equipped with a massive sound system. He transformed his nights at The Bandwagon into The Heavy Metal Soundhouse, a spot specialising in hard rock and heavy metal music and a place to listen to albums of established acts and to demos of new bands, which circulated among fans through cassette trading. NWOBHM International Heroes' lead singer and songwriter, Sean T. Wright, was a renowned cassette trader at the time.

Besides participating in air guitar competitions and watching live shows, the audience could also vote for Kay's selections. The DJ made a weekly Heavy Metal Top 100 list of the most requested songs at The Soundhouse, by both newcomers and established bands and sent it to record shops and to the music journal Sounds, the only paper that showed interest in the developing scene. Many young musicians realised that they were not alone in playing metal only through that weekly list, which included bands from all over the country. At the time, Geoff Barton was a staffer at Sounds who wrote features on the new up-and-coming metal bands and was pivotal in directing the developing subculture of metalheads with his articles. At the suggestion of his editor Alan Lewis, and in an attempt to find a common stylistic element in the bands' music, he used the term "New Wave of British Heavy Metal" for the first time in his review of a gig on the Metal Crusade tour featuring Angel Witch, Iron Maiden and Samson at The Music Machine in London on 8 May 1979. The term soon became the identifier for the whole movement.

=== First wave (1979–1981) ===
Compilation albums featuring bands from the nascent movement started to circulate, issued by Neat Records, Heavy Metal Records and Ebony Records, companies that became leaders in the independent metal label market during the 1980s. The fresh outlet of Neal Kay's chart, the attention of Sounds and the many compilations issued by independent labels, focused the efforts of the new bands on producing demos and singles. Iron Maiden's The Soundhouse Tapes is one of the best-known collections of such demos. As Barton recalled: "There were hundreds of these bands. Maybe even thousands. Barely a day would go by without a clutch of new NWOBHM singles arriving in the Sounds office."

Tommy Vance, a BBC radio host, took notice of the phenomenon and played singles by the NWOBHM bands on his late night Friday Rock Show on BBC Radio 1. Along with John Peel's broadcast, Vance's was the only mainstream radio show to feature songs from underground metal acts, many of whom were invited to play live at BBC studios under the supervision of long-time collaborator and producer, Tony Wilson. Alice's Restaurant Rock Radio, a pirate FM radio station in London, also championed the new bands on air and with their own "roadshow" in rock pubs and clubs.

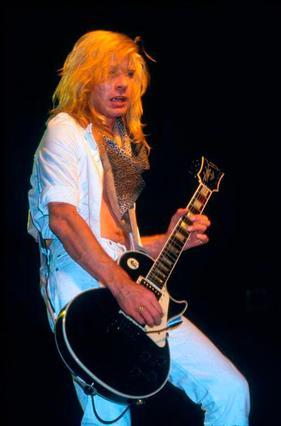
Steve "Steaming" Clark, lead guitarist of Def Leppard. Extended virtuoso guitar solos were a characteristic of heavy metal music in the 1980s.

Despite the transition of the young bands from being local attractions to touring extensively in the UK, major record labels' A&R agents still did not recognise the rising new trend. Thus, most new bands signed contracts with small independent labels, which could afford only limited printings of singles and albums and usually offered only national distribution. Many other bands, including Iron Maiden, Def Leppard and Diamond Head, self-produced their first releases and sold them through mail order or at concerts. Saxon were the first to sign with an internationally distributed label, the French Carrere Records, followed by Def Leppard with Phonogram in August 1979, and Iron Maiden with EMI in December 1979. In early 1980, EMI tested the market with the Neal Kay-compiled album Metal for Muthas and a UK tour of the bands that had contributed to the compilation, eventually signing Angel Witch (who were dropped after the release of their first single) and Ethel the Frog.

Sounds gave Metal for Muthas a poor review, but the album was nevertheless a commercial success and may have been instrumental in encouraging major labels to sign a few more bands. A II Z, Fist, White Spirit and Praying Mantis were dropped after the release of their debut albums, while Tygers of Pan Tang, Samson, More, Demon and Girlschool had more success and lasted longer on major labels' line-ups. The new releases by these bands were better produced and some of them, with the support of intensive tours in the UK and Europe, obtained good chart results. The best chart performances of that period were for Iron Maiden's debut album Iron Maiden and for Wheels of Steel by Saxon, which reached No. 4 and No. 5 on the UK Albums Chart respectively, while their singles "Running Free", "Wheels of Steel" and "747 (Strangers in the Night)" entered the UK Singles Chart Top 50. The immediate consequence of that success was increased media coverage for metal bands, which included appearances on the British music TV shows Top of the Pops and The Old Grey Whistle Test. The emergence of many new bands in the period between 1978 and 1980 was another remarkable effect of the promotion of the movement to a relevant national phenomenon. (Note: In chronological order of formation, the most notable being: Savage, Girlschool, Trespass, Demon, Mama's Boys, Fist, Witchfinder General, Satan, Grim Reaper, Venom, Persian Risk, Sweet Savage, Blitzkrieg, Jaguar, and Tank.)

The momentum behind the NWOBHM also benefited already established bands, which reclaimed the spotlight with new and acclaimed releases. Ex-Deep Purple singer Ian Gillan returned to sing heavy metal with the album Mr. Universe in 1979 and was on the forefront of the British metal scene with his band Gillan in the following years. His former Deep Purple bandmate Ritchie Blackmore also climbed the UK charts with his hard rock group Rainbow's releases Down to Earth (1979) and Difficult to Cure (1981). Black Sabbath recovered and returned to success with the albums Heaven and Hell (1980) and Mob Rules (1981), featuring the ex-Rainbow singer Ronnie James Dio. 1980 saw several other entries by hard rock and heavy metal bands in the top 10 of the British charts: MSG's first album peaked at No. 8, Whitesnake's Ready an' Willing at No. 6, Judas Priest's best-seller British Steel and Motörhead's Ace of Spades at No. 4, while Back in Black by AC/DC reached number one.

As proof of the successful revival of the British hard rock and metal scene, tours and gigs of old and new acts were sold out, both at home and in other European countries, where the movement had spread. Groups arising from the NWOBHM were no longer precluded from world tours and were often chosen as opening acts for major bands in arenas and stadiums. Iron Maiden supported Kiss in Europe in 1980, embarking on their first world tour as headliners in 1981, as well as opening for Judas Priest and UFO in the US. Def Leppard visited the US for the first time in 1980 for a three-month trek supporting Pat Travers, Judas Priest, Ted Nugent, AC/DC and Sammy Hagar. Saxon opened for Judas Priest in Europe and for Rush and AC/DC in the US in 1981. NWOBHM bands were already present on the roster of the famous Reading Festival in 1980, and were quickly promoted to headliners for the 1981 and 1982 events. The 1980 edition was also remarkable for the violent protests against Def Leppard, whose declared interest in the American market was received badly by British fans. In addition to Reading, a new festival called Monsters of Rock was created in 1980 at Castle Donington, England, to showcase only hard rock and heavy metal acts.

=== Into the mainstream (1981–1985) ===
The Number of the Beast cover art shows in vivid colours Iron Maiden's ghoulish mascot Eddie manipulating the Devil as a puppet while condemned souls burn in Hell. According to US professor Bryan A. Bardine the message is clear: "this album evokes power, passion and music that present darker themes and images."

The NWOBHM eventually found space in newspapers and music magazines other than Sounds, as journalists caught up with the "next big thing" happening in the UK. Melody Maker even published a weekly heavy metal chart based on record shop sales. Sounds' publisher exploited his support of the movement to launch the first issue of Kerrang!, a colour magazine directed by Geoff Barton devoted exclusively to hard rock and heavy metal, in June 1981. Kerrang! was an unexpected success and soon became the reference magazine for metalheads worldwide, followed shortly by the American Circus and Hit Parader, the Dutch Aardschok, the German Metal Hammer and the British Metal Forces. The attention of international media meant more record sales and more world tours for NWOBHM bands, whose albums entered many foreign charts. Their attempts to climb the British charts culminated in Iron Maiden's The Number of the Beast topping the UK Albums Chart on 10 April 1982 and staying at number 1 for two weeks. The album charted at number 33 in the US, where the band acquired a reputation as Devil-worshippers due to the album cover's depiction of a hellish scene.

In October 1980, reviewing two heavy metal compilations for Sounds, Barton wrote that the NWOBHM had "peaked" and was "irrevocably locked into a slow downward spiral into ignominy", adding that this was "positively the last time" he would use the term. Amid "hastily-assembled albums, cash-ins and trash-ins", he found it increasingly difficult to tell "genuine, committed HM exponents" from "freshly-smelted bandwagon jumpers". According to the scholar Steve Waksman, Barton was trying to disavow the whole phenomenon, frustrated at how easily record labels were cashing in on enthusiasm for heavy metal. In late 1981, however, Barton considered the NWOBHM even stronger than in its "Maiden/Leppard/Saxon heyday", citing as proof the quality of the demo tapes he received every week from aspiring bands hoping to be featured in Kerrang!'s "Armed and Ready" column. Coincidentally, in the same year, the Bandwagon closed in 1981, and the Prince of Wales pub was subsequently demolished to build a restaurant. Although the movement had lost some of its appeal for diehard fans, as evidenced by the increased popularity of American-influenced AOR releases on sales-based national polls, it retained enough vitality to launch a second wave of bands, which rose from the underground and released their first albums in 1982 and 1983. (Note: Notable bands that moved into the spotlight after 1981 are: Avenger, Rock Goddess, Tysondog, Tokyo Blade, Elixir, Atomkraft, and Rogue Male.)

NWOBHM bands had been touring steadily in the United States, but had not yet received enough FM radio airplay there to make a significant impression on American charts. Def Leppard remedied that, releasing Pyromania at the beginning of 1983, an album with a more melodic and FM-friendly approach in comparison with the more aggressive sound of their earlier music. The band's goal of reaching a wider international audience, which included many female fans, was attained completely in the US, where Pyromania peaked at No. 2 on the Billboard 200 chart behind Michael Jackson's Thriller. Thanks to a string of hit singles and the heavy rotation of their music videos on the recently launched MTV, the album had sold more than six millions copies in the US by 1984 and made Def Leppard superstars. The overwhelming international success of Pyromania induced both American and British bands to follow Def Leppard's example, giving a decisive boost to the more commercial and melodic glam metal and heralding the end of the NWOBHM.

=== Decline ===
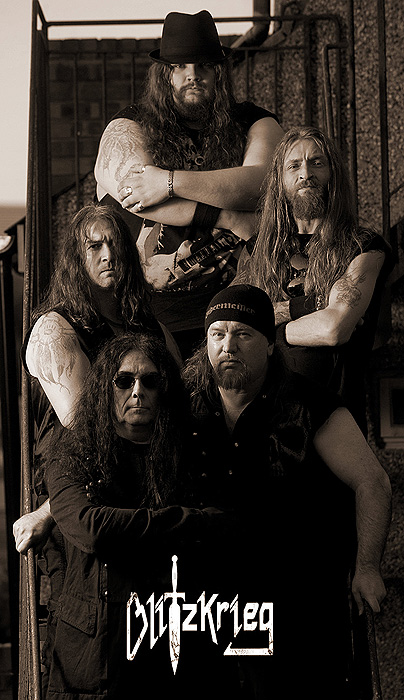
Blitzkrieg are one of the NWOBHM bands which re-formed in the 2000s.

The UK had been a home for music video pioneers. When the music video cable channel MTV started broadcasting in 1982, the importance of videos abruptly grew, changing the video from an occasional promotional tool to an indispensable means of reaching an audience. MTV filled its programmes with many hard rock and heavy metal videos, but these were too expensive for bands who either had no recording contract or had signed to small, independent labels. Moreover, music videos exalted the visual appeal of a band, an area where some British metal groups were deficient. So the NWOBHM suffered the same decline as other musical phenomena that were based on low-budget productions and an underground following. Many of its leaders, such as Diamond Head, Tygers of Pan Tang, Angel Witch and Samson, were unable to follow up on their initial success; their attempts to update their look and sound to match new expectations of the wider audience not only failed, but also alienated their original fans.

By the mid-1980s, glam metal, which often emphasised a band's appearance and featured lyrics about love and sex, quickly replaced other styles of metal in the tastes of many British rock fans; this sub-genre emanating from Hollywood's Sunset Strip was spearheaded already in the late 1970s by Van Halen and followed by bands such as Mötley Crüe, Quiet Riot, Dokken, Great White, Ratt and W.A.S.P. New Jersey act Bon Jovi and the Swedish Europe, thanks to their successful fusion of hard rock and romantic pop, also became very popular in the UK, with the former even headlining the 1987 Monsters of Rock Festival. Record companies latched on to the more polished glam metal subgenre over the NWOBHM bands, which maintained a fan base elsewhere in Europe, but found themselves crowded out of the UK and US markets by the success of these American groups. While the attention devoted to the NWOBHM bands waned, a new succession of far less mainstream metal subgenres began to emerge and attract many British metalheads. Power metal and thrash metal, both stemming from the NWOBHM and maintaining much of its ethos, were gaining critical acclaim and commercial success in the second half of the 1980s with their even faster and heavier sound. Bands such as Helloween, Savatage, Metallica, Slayer, Megadeth, and Anthrax captured much of the market share of those metalheads who were not content with the sound or style of more mainstream, pop-oriented metal bands.

The N.W.O.B.H.M. Encyclopedia by Malc Macmillan lists more than 500 recording bands established in the decade between 1975 and 1985 and related to the movement. (Note: The last notable ones being: Baby Tuckoo, Chrome Molly, Tredegar, and Battlezone.) Probably as many bands launched in the same period, but never emerged from their local club scene, or recorded nothing more than demo tapes or limited pressings of self-produced singles. The record labels' lack of interest, poor management of bands, internal struggles and musical choices that turned off much of their original fan base, resulted in most groups disbanding and disappearing by the end of the decade. A few of the best known groups, such as Praying Mantis in Japan and Saxon, Demon and Tokyo Blade in mainland Europe, survived in foreign markets. Some others, namely Raven, Girlschool and Grim Reaper, tried to break through in the US market signing with American labels, but their attempts were unsuccessful. Two of the more popular bands of the movement, however, went on to considerable, lasting success. Iron Maiden have since become one of the most commercially successful and influential heavy metal bands of all time, even after adopting a more progressive style. Def Leppard became even more successful, targeting the American mainstream rock market with their more refined hard rock sound.

=== Revival ===
The widespread popularity of the Internet in the late 1990s/early 2000s helped NWOBHM fans and musicians to reconnect and rekindle their shared enthusiasm. The NWOBHM experienced a minor underground revival, highlighted by the good sales of old vinyl and collectibles and by the demand for new performances. Statements of appreciation by metal bands of the 1990s, the success of tribute bands, the re-issues of old albums and the production of new thoroughly edited compilations, attracted the media's attention and encouraged many of the original groups to reunite for festival appearances and tours. According to Macmillan and AllMusic reviewer Eduardo Rivadavia, probably the most important of those compilation albums was New Wave of British Heavy Metal '79 Revisited, compiled by Metallica's drummer Lars Ulrich and former Sounds and Kerrang! journalist Geoff Barton. It was released in 1990 as a double CD, featuring bands as obscure as Hollow Ground right through to the major acts of the era.

A new publication called Classic Rock, featuring Barton and many of the writers from Kerrang!'s first run, championed the NWOBHM revival and continues to focus much of its attention on rock acts from the 1980s. Starting in the 2000s, many reunited bands recorded new albums and revisited their original styles, abandoned in the second half of the 1980s. Their presence, at metal festivals and on the international rock club circuit, has been constant ever since.

== Legacy and influence ==
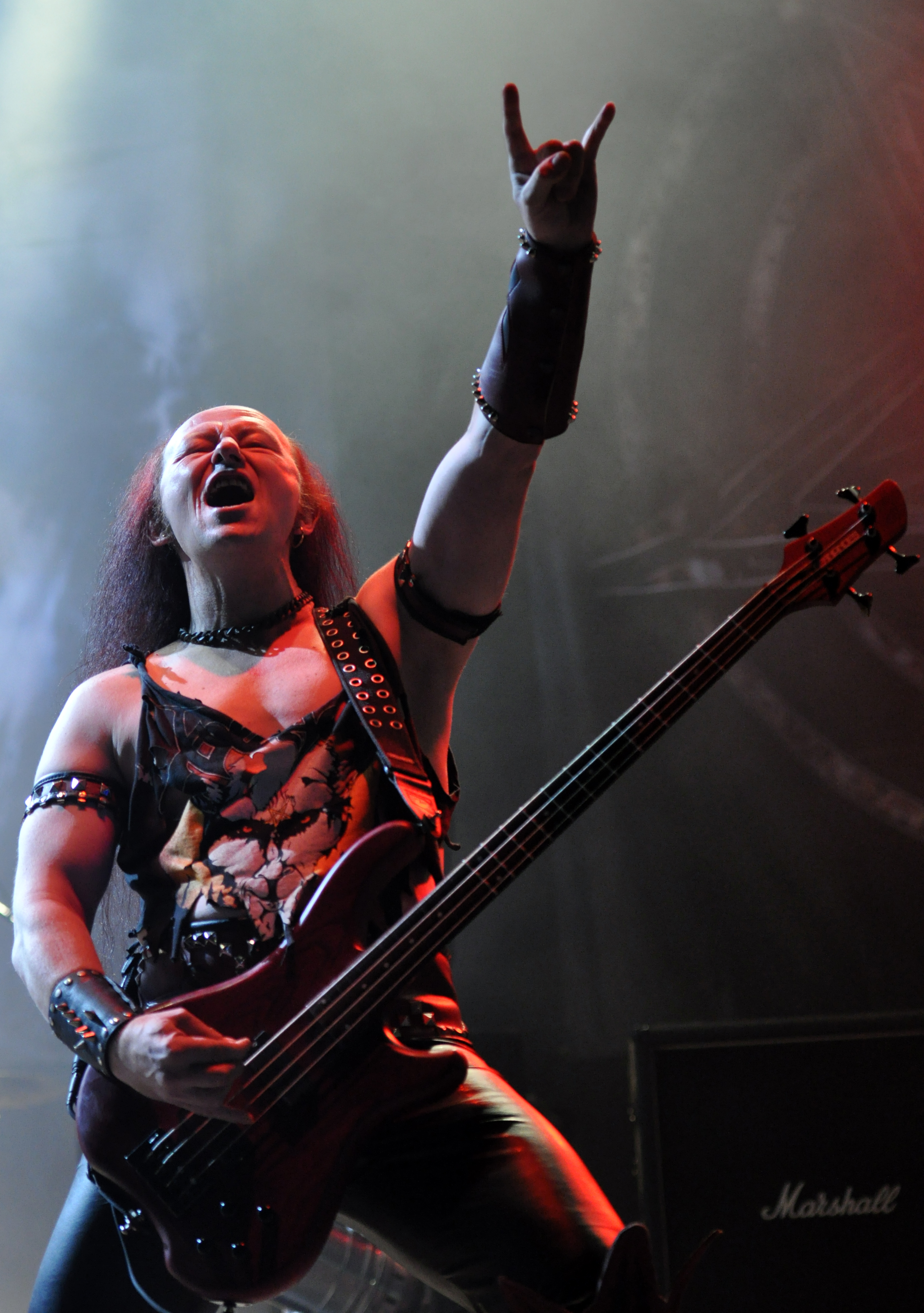
Cronos of Venom. Venom are considered precursors of both black metal and thrash metal.

It’s no exaggeration to say that the New Wave of British Heavy Metal saved metal from itself, when it simultaneously replaced and legitimized the efforts of many critically abused ‘70s pioneers (like Black Sabbath, Deep Purple and Judas Priest) with the next generation of denim and leather warriors.

— Eduardo Rivadavia of Ultimate Classic Rock

The NWOBHM triggered a renaissance in a stagnant rock genre, but took on heavy criticism for the excessive local media hype surrounding a legion of typically mediocre musicians. Detractors think that, unlike heavy metal of the preceding decades, their music was unoriginal and included no classic rock recordings. Nevertheless, these bands and their diverse output offered a blueprint that counterparts across the Western world would later emulate and expand. The collision of styles that characterised the NWOBHM is now seen as key to the diversification of heavy metal in the second half of the 1980s into various subgenres that came to the fore in the 1990s. The stardom of Def Leppard in the US provided a catalyst for the growth of glam metal, just as bands like Angel Witch, Witchfynde, Cloven Hoof and especially Venom (Note: The black metal subgenre takes its name from Venom's 1982 album Black Metal.) generated the music, lyrics, cover art and attitude that sparked black metal in its various forms in Europe and America. Motörhead, Iron Maiden, Raven, Tank, Venom and several minor groups are viewed as precursors of speed metal and thrash metal, two subgenres which carried forward the crossover with punk, incorporating elements of hardcore while amplifying volume, velocity and aggressive tone.

Starting around 1982, distant points such as North America, West Germany, and Brazil each became the locus of its own distinctive thrash metal scenes – East Coast and Bay Area, Teutonic, and Brazilian thrash metal. Their debt to the NWOBHM was acknowledged for example by Metallica's Lars Ulrich, an active fan and avid collector of NWOBHM recordings and memorabilia. Under his influence, the setlists of Metallica's early shows were filled with covers of British metal groups. The sound of the NWOBHM even "cross-pollinated" a subgenre of punk, as UK 82 street punk bands like Discharge blended punk music with elements of metal. The birth of speed metal in the early 1980s was also pivotal for the evolution of power metal in the latter half of the decade, as exemplified by Helloween from Germany, and Manowar, Savatage, and Virgin Steele from the US.

Metallica – "Am I Evil?" (1984)
Diamond Head's "Am I Evil?" was one of the cover songs played by Metallica in their early days and is still part of their live setlist.

Since the beginning of the NWOBHM, North American bands like Anvil, Riot, Twisted Sister, Manowar, Virgin Steele, The Rods, Hellion, Cirith Ungol, and Exciter had a continuous exchange with the other side of the Atlantic, where their music was appreciated by British metalheads. In this climate of reciprocity, Manowar and Virgin Steele initially signed with the British indie label Music for Nations, while Twisted Sister recorded their first two albums in London.

The sound of Japanese bands Earthshaker, Loudness, Anthem and other minor groups was also influenced by the NWOBHM, whose British sound engineers were used for their early albums. The Japanese band Bow Wow even transferred to England to be part of the British metal scene. Germany, Sweden, Denmark, Belgium, Netherlands, France, Spain, Yugoslavia and Mexico promptly welcomed the new British bands and spawned imitators almost immediately. Acts like Accept, Grave Digger, Sinner and Warlock from Germany, E. F. Band from Sweden, Mercyful Fate from Denmark, Killer and Ostrogoth from Belgium, Picture and Bodine from the Netherlands, Trust, Sortilège and Nightmare from France, Barón Rojo, Obús and Ángeles del Infierno from Spain, Gordi, Pomaranča, Divlje Jagode, and Warriors from Yugoslavia, Luzbel from Mexico or Aria from the Soviet Union formed between 1978 and the beginning of the new decade and were heavily influenced by the sound of the NWOBHM. Many of these bands signed with the Dutch Roadrunner Records or with the Belgian Mausoleum Records, independent labels that also published recordings of British NWOBHM acts.

== See also ==
- First-wave black metal
- List of new wave of British heavy metal bands
- New wave of American heavy metal
- New wave of traditional heavy metal
- Second British Invasion

== Sources ==
=== Bibliography ===
- Barton, Geoff (19 May 1979). "If You Want Blood (and Flashbombs and Dry Ice and Confetti) You Got It". Sounds. pp. 28–29.
- Barton, Geoff (4 October 1980). "Scrap Metal". Sounds. p. 39.
- Barton, Geoff (September 1981). "The Night of the Demon". Kerrang!. No. 3. pp. 6–7.
- Barton, Geoff (September 1981). "Armed & Ready". Kerrang!. No. 3. p. 12.
- Bayer, Gerd; et al. (2009). Heavy Metal Music in Britain. Farnham, Surrey, UK: Ashgate Publishing. ISBN 978-0-7546-6423-9.
- Bonutto, Dante (28 July 1983). "Male Orientated Rock". Kerrang!. No. 47. Archived from the original on 4 March 2016.
- Bushell, Garry; Halfin, Ross (1984). Iron Maiden – Running Free. London, UK: Zomba Books. ISBN 978-0-946391-50-9.
- Charles, D. W. (December 1981). "Captain Gillan". Kerrang!. No. 6. pp. 10, 12.
- Christe, Ian (2004). Sound of the Beast: The Complete Headbanging History of Heavy Metal. !t Books. New York City: HarperCollins. ISBN 978-0-380-81127-4.
- Considine, J. D. (15 November 1990). "Metal Mania". Rolling Stone. No. 591. pp. 100–104.
- Corich, Robert M. (1998). The Collection (CD booklet). Girlschool. England: Sanctuary Records (CMDD014).
- Crampton, Luke (30 December 1982). "Best Sellers of 1982". Kerrang!. No. 32. p. 3.
- Daniels, Neil (2010). The Story of Judas Priest: Defenders of the Faith. New York City: Omnibus Press. ISBN 978-1-84772-707-7.
- "Decibel Hall of Fame – No. 74 -Mercyful Fate Melissa". Decibel. No. 78. April 2011. Archived from the original on 17 November 2015.
- Duncombe, Stephen; Tremblay, Maxwell; et al. (25 July 2011). White Riot: Punk Rock and the Politics of Race. London, UK: Verso Books. ISBN 978-1-84467-688-0.
- Dunn, Jeffrey (30 December 1982). "Kwotes of the Year". Kerrang!. No. 32. p. 13. "We don't do gigs, we do shows. It's fucking massive. If you stand at the front of the stage you're gonna get your head blown off!"
- Fouce, Héctor; del Val, Feràn (2013). "From el Rollo to Heavy Metal". In Martinez, Sìlvia; Fouce, Héctor (eds.). Made in Spain: Studies in Popular Music. New York City: Routledge. ISBN 978-0-203-12703-2.
- Fricke, David (1987). Animal Instinct: The Def Leppard Story. London, UK: Zomba Books. ISBN 978-0-946391-55-4.
- Glasper, Ian (1 August 2004). Burning Britain: The History of UK Punk 1980–1984. London, UK: Cherry Red Books. ISBN 978-1-901447-24-8.
- Hammonds, Steve (August 1983). "Exciter". Metal Forces. No. 1. p. 33. Archived from the original (PDF) on 15 February 2021.
- "Explosion Heavy en el Norte". Heavy Rock (in Spanish). No. 10. 1982. Archived from the original (JPG) on 17 November 2015.
- Hatch, David; Millward, Stephen (1987). "After the Flood". From Blues to Rock: An Analytical History of Pop Music. Manchester, UK: Manchester University Press. ISBN 978-0-7190-1489-5.
- Iommi, Tony; Lammers, T. J. (2011). "Bill goes to shits". Iron Man: My Journey through Heaven and Hell with Black Sabbath. Cambridge, Massachusetts: Da Capo Press. ISBN 978-0-306-82054-0.
- Johnson, Howard (19 May 1983). "Warning from Tokyo". Kerrang!. No. 42. pp. 24–26.
- Johnson, Howard (5 April 1984). "Don't Fear the Reaper ...". Kerrang!. No. 65. p. 11.
- Johnson, Howard (1984). "The Big Read". Extra Kerrang!. No. 1. p. 38.
- Johnson, Howard (30 October 1986). "Hear No Evil". Kerrang!. No. 132. pp. 10–11.
- Johnson, Rick (October 1979). "Is Heavy Metal Dead? Last Drum Solo at the Power Chord Corral". Creem. Vol. II, no. 5.
- Kilmister, Ian; Garza, Janiss (2004). White Line Fever. New York City: Simon & Schuster. ISBN 978-0-684-85868-5.
- Konow, David (2 January 2003). Bang Your Head: The Rise and Fall of Heavy Metal. New York City: Three Rivers Press. ISBN 978-0-609-80732-3.
- Lane, Frederick S. (2006). The Decency Wars: The Campaign to Cleanse American Culture. Amherst, New York: Prometheus Books. ISBN 978-1-59102-427-9.
- Ling, Dave (18 December 1999). "Interview with Gerry Bron". Classic Rock. No. 9.
- Macmillan, Malc (2012). The N.W.O.B.H.M. Encyclopedia. Iron Pages Books (3 ed.). Berlin, Germany: I.P. Verlag Jeske/Mader GbR. ISBN 978-3-931624-16-3.
- Makowski, Pete (9 August 1980). "Back to Schooldays". Sounds. Archived from the original on 27 July 2010.
- McGee, Hal (2 June 1992). "Cause and Effect". In James, Robin (ed.). Cassette Mythos. New York City: Autonomedia. ISBN 978-0-936756-69-1.
- McIver, Joel (9 January 2006). Justice for All: The Truth About Metallica (2 ed.). London, UK: Omnibus Press. ISBN 978-1-84449-828-4.
- McIver, Joel (1 October 2010). The Bloody Reign of Slayer (2 ed.). London, UK: Omnibus Press. ISBN 978-1-84938-386-8.
- Millar, Robbi (1 March 1980). "The Dinosaur's Daughters". Sounds. Archived from the original on 27 July 2010.
- Miller, Paul (1986). "UK Dekay?". Mega Metal Kerrang!. No. 1. pp. 30–31.
- Miller, Paul (1986). "The Men from Ungol". Mega Metal Kerrang!. No. 4. pp. 18–19.
- Miller, Paul (1986). "The Madder They Come ...". Mega Metal Kerrang!. No. 4. p. 29.
- "Monsters of Rock" (JPG) (Press release). Monsters of Rock. August 1980. Archived from the original on 14 March 2016.
- "Monsters of Rock" (JPG) (Press release). Monsters of Rock. August 1987. Archived from the original on 19 October 2013.
- Moynihan, Michael; Søderlind, Difdrik (1998). Lords of Chaos – The Bloody Rise of the Satanic Metal Underground. Port Townsend, Washington, US: Feral House. ISBN 978-0-922915-48-4.
- Mustaine, Dave; Layden, Joe (2010). "Lars and Me, or What Am I Getting Myself Into?". Mustaine – A Heavy Metal Memoire. New York City: HarperCollins. ISBN 978-0-06-199703-7.
- Popoff, Martin (1 November 2005). The Collector's Guide to Heavy Metal: Volume 2: The Eighties. Burlington, Ontario, Canada: Collector's Guide Publishing. ISBN 978-1-894959-31-5.
- Popoff, Martin (15 August 2014). The Big Book of Hair Metal: The Illustrated Oral History of Heavy Metal's Debauched Decade. Minneapolis, Minnesota: Voyageur Press. ISBN 978-0-7603-4546-7.
- Radovanović, Bojana (2019). "Heavy metal na jugoslovenski način': Nastanak i razvoj metal scene u Jugoslaviji". In Veselinović Hoffman, Mirjana; Atanasofski, Srdan; Sovtić, Nemanja (eds.). Yugoslav Idea About Music (PDF) (in Serbian). Matica: Muzikološko društvo Srbije. pp. 249–256. ISBN 978-86-7946-306-7. Archived (PDF) from the original on 12 October 2021.
- "Reading Rock '80" (JPG) (Press release). Reading and Leeds Festivals. August 1980. Archived from the original on 20 March 2016.
- "Reading Rock '81" (GIF) (Press release). Reading and Leeds Festivals. August 1981. Archived from the original on 14 March 2016.
- "Reading Rock '82" (JPG) (Press release). Reading and Leeds Festivals. August 1982. Archived from the original on 10 March 2016.
- Roland, Paul (1984). "The State of Independents". Extra Kerrang!. No. 1. pp. 23, 24, 26, 46.
- Simmons, Sylvie (1986). "'Lock Jaw". Mega Metal Kerrang!. No. 4. pp. 8–11.
- Sinclair, David (5 April 1984). "Only the Strong Survive". Kerrang!. No. 65. p. 29.
- Smith, Richard (11 May 1978). "Will Heavy Metal Survive the Seventies?". Circus. No. 181.
- Thompson, Dave (August 2004). Smoke on the Water: The Deep Purple Story. Toronto, Canada: ECW Press. ISBN 978-1-55022-618-8.
- Tucker, John (2006). Suzie Smiled ... The New Wave of British Heavy Metal. Shropshire, UK: Independent Music Press. ISBN 978-0-9549704-7-5.
- Waksman, Steve (2009). This Ain't the Summer of Love: Conflict and Crossover in Heavy Metal and Punk. Berkeley, California: University of California Press. ISBN 978-0-520-94388-9.
- Walser, Robert (15 May 1993). Running with the Devil: Power, Gender and Madness in Heavy Metal Music. Middletown, Connecticut: Wesleyan University. ISBN 978-0-8195-6260-9.
- Watts, Chris (19 November 1988). "Once Bitten ... Twice Dry". Kerrang!. No. 214. pp. 28–29.
- Watts, Chris (19 December 1992). "Where Are They Now?". Kerrang!. No. 423. pp. 36–37.
- Weinstein, Deena (2000). Heavy Metal: The Music and Its Culture. Da Capo Press. ISBN 978-0-306-80970-5.
- Welch, Chris (1988). Black Sabbath. London, UK: Bobcat Books. ISBN 978-0-7119-1738-5.
- Zarnowitz, Victor; Moore, Geoffrey H. (October 1977). "The Recession and Recovery of 1973–1976". Explorations in Economic Research, Volume 4, number 4 (PDF). Cambridge, Massachusetts: National Bureau of Economic Research. pp. 1–87. Archived (PDF) from the original on 15 August 2020.

=== Filmography ===
- Anon. (10 June 2008). Iron Maiden and the New Wave of British Heavy Metal (Documentary). New Malden, UK: Prism Films. ASIN B0016GLZ4M.
- Dunn, Sam; McFadyen, Scot; Wise, Jessica Joy (2005). Metal: A Headbanger's Journey (Documentary). Montreal, Canada: Seville Pictures. ASIN B000EGEJIY.
- Dunn, Sam; McFadyen, Scot (10 December 2011). "New Wave of British Heavy Metal". Metal Evolution (Documentary). Toronto, Canada: Banger Films, Inc. ASIN B007GFYC0Q.
- Kirkby, Tim (26 November 2001). Classic Albums: Iron Maiden – The Number of the Beast (Documentary). London, UK: Isis Productions / Eagle Vision. ASIN B00005QJIA.
- Matthews, Amos (8 November 2004). The History of Iron Maiden – Part 1: The Early Days (Documentary). London, UK: EMI. ASIN B0006B29Z2.

=== Websites ===
- "British Punk". AllMusic. Archived from the original on 3 June 2012.
- "Def Leppard – High 'N' Dry awards". AllMusic. Archived from the original on 19 January 2013.
- "Iron Maiden – The Number of the Beast awards". AllMusic. Archived from the original on 8 June 2012.
- "Le Griffe Biography". AllMusic. Archived from the original on 25 September 2015.
- "Mammoth Biography". AllMusic. Archived from the original on 5 June 2012.
- "New Wave of British Heavy Metal". AllMusic. Archived from the original on 5 June 2012.
- "Power metal". AllMusic. Archived from the original on 4 June 2012.
- "Shiva Biography". AllMusic. Archived from the original on 25 September 2015.
- "Shy biography". AllMusic. Archived from the original on 20 June 2012.
- "Speed/Thrash Metal". AllMusic. Archived from the original on 2 June 2012.
- "Spider Biography". AllMusic. Archived from the original on 26 April 2013.
- "Wrathchild Biography". AllMusic. Archived from the original on 26 June 2013.
- "Alice's Restaurant". AMFM.org.uk. Archived from the original on 21 May 2015.
- Barton, Geoff (16 August 2005). "HM Soundhouse Special Features: The New Wave of British Heavy Metal". HMsoundhouse.com. Archived from the original on 17 November 2015.
- "1974 Feb: Hung parliament looms". BBC News. 5 April 2005.
- "1974 Oct: Wilson makes it four". BBC News. 5 April 2005. Archived from the original on 12 November 2025.
- "Keeping It Peel – Peel Sessions". BBC. Archived from the original on 18 April 2015.
- "The Old Grey Whistle Test: BBC Two England, 8 April 1982". Genome Beta. BBC. 8 April 1982. Archived from the original on 1 June 2016.
- Bowar, Chad. "What Is New Wave of British Heavy Metal?". Heavy Metal 101. About.com. Archived from the original on 27 January 2006.
- "Future hires ex-Kerrang! editor in Classic Rock overhaul". Brand Republic. 17 September 2004.
- Campau, Don (27 October 2011). "The Living Archive of Underground Music: Sean T. Wright". DonCampau.com. Archived from the original on 23 June 2013.
- DeFeis, David. "Virgin Steele Official Biography". virgin-steele.com. Archived from the original on 7 April 2010.
- "Nicko McBrain Biography, Videos & Pictures". Drum Lessons.com. Archived from the original on 24 March 2015.
- Erlewine, Stephen Thomas. "Anthrax Biography". AllMusic. Archived from the original on 13 November 2013.
- Erlewine, Stephen Thomas. "Curtis Knight Biography". AllMusic. Archived from the original on 1 October 2015.
- Erlewine, Stephen Thomas. "Def Leppard biography". AllMusic. Archived from the original on 14 May 2014.
- Erlewine, Stephen Thomas. "Led Zeppelin Biography". AllMusic. Archived from the original on 10 December 2015.
- Erlewine, Stephen Thomas. "Megadeth Biography". AllMusic. Archived from the original on 1 August 2013.
- Erlewine, Stephen Thomas. "Metallica Biography". AllMusic. Archived from the original on 6 August 2015.
- Falckenbach, Alfie (March 2002). "Mausoleum: The story behind the legendary heavy metal label. Part I (1982–1986)". Music-Avenue.net. Archived from the original on 17 January 2011.
- Freeman, Phil. "Hell – Human Remains review". AllMusic. Archived from the original on 25 August 2015.
- "The Soundhouse Story part 1". HMsoundhouse.com. Archived from the original on 14 December 2014.
- "The Soundhouse Story part 2". HMsoundhouse.com. Archived from the original on 4 March 2016.
- Huey, Steve. "Savatage Biography". AllMusic. Archived from the original on 5 October 2013.
- Huey, Steve. "Slayer Biography". AllMusic. Archived from the original on 6 November 2013.
- "Infodisc.fr Note: You must select Iron Maiden". Infodisc.fr. Archived from the original on 14 April 2016.
- "Infodisc.fr Note: You must select Saxon". Infodisc.fr. Archived from the original on 12 June 2020.
- Johansson, Henrik; Grain, Rob; Aylmer, Chris; Samson, Paul. "The Story of Samson". Book of Hours.net. Archived from the original on 9 October 2007.
- Marsicano, Dan. "What Is Power Metal?". Heavy Metal 101. About.com. Archived from the original on 25 April 2009.
- "July 15, 2007, Olympic Stadium, Helsinki, FIN". LiveMetallica.com. Archived from the original on 16 January 2008.
- "Kerrang! Iron Maiden Tribute Album". Metallica Official Website. 25 June 2008. Archived from the original on 28 June 2008.
- Mitchell, Ben (13 April 2014). "Inside the World of New Wave of British Heavy Metal". Esquire. Archived from the original on 7 March 2016.
- Monger, James Christopher. "Manowar Biography". AllMusic. Archived from the original on 10 November 2013.
- Noble, Colin. "Colin Noble: ARfm – Our Presenters – Unsigned Show / Sunday Morning Show". ARfm. Archived from the original on 18 April 2015.
- Norton, Justin M. (2010). "Grave Digger Interview". About.com. Archived from the original on 5 April 2015.
- "AC/DC – Official Charts". Official Charts Company. Archived from the original on 25 February 2015.
- "Bad Company – Official Charts". Official Charts Company. Archived from the original on 19 March 2015.
- "Black Sabbath – Official Charts". Official Charts Company. Archived from the original on 26 April 2015.
- "Blue Oyster Cult – Official Charts". Official Charts Company. Archived from the original on 22 April 2016.
- "Budgie – Official Charts". Official Charts Company. Archived from the original on 3 April 2015.
- "Def Leppard Official Charts". Official Charts Company. Archived from the original on 20 August 2015.
- "Girlschool Official Charts". Official Charts Company. Archived from the original on 3 April 2015.
- "Hawkwind – Official Charts". Official Charts Company. Archived from the original on 4 April 2015.
- "Iron Maiden Official Charts". Official Charts Company. 23 February 1980. Archived from the original on 4 March 2015.
- "Judas Priest – Official Charts". Official Charts Company. Archived from the original on 16 August 2018.
- "Kiss – Official Charts". Official Charts Company. Archived from the original on 3 April 2015.
- "Michael Schenker Group – Official Charts". Official Charts Company. Archived from the original on 3 April 2015.
- "Motorhead Official Charts". Official Charts Company. Archived from the original on 3 April 2015.
- "Nazareth – Official Charts". Official Charts Company. Archived from the original on 3 April 2015.
- "Queen – Official Charts". Official Charts Company. Archived from the original on 25 February 2015.
- "Rainbow – Official Charts". Official Charts Company. Archived from the original on 3 April 2015.
- "Rush – Official Charts". Official Charts Company. Archived from the original on 3 April 2015.
- "Saxon Official Charts". Official Charts Company. Archived from the original on 3 April 2015.
- "Scorpions – Official Charts". Official Charts Company. Archived from the original on 2 April 2015.
- "Status Quo – Official Charts". Official Charts Company. Archived from the original on 23 April 2015.
- "Official Albums Chart Results Matching: The Number Of The Beast". Official Charts Company. Archived from the original on 4 April 2015.
- "Thin Lizzy – Official Charts". Official Charts Company. Archived from the original on 26 April 2015.
- "Tygers of Pan Tang Official Charts". Official Charts Company. Archived from the original on 24 September 2015.
- "UFO – Official Charts". Official Charts Company. Archived from the original on 4 April 2015.
- "Whitesnake – Official Charts". Official Charts Company. Archived from the original on 27 February 2015.
- "Picture Biography". Picture Official Website. Archived from the original on 17 November 2015.
- Prato, Greg. "Lemmy – Biography". AllMusic. Archived from the original on 15 August 2013.
- "When Dinosaurs Roamed The Earth ..." Punk77.co.uk. 11 May 2009. Archived from the original on 5 January 2002.
- "Roadshow: The Early Years". Radio Rewind.co.uk. Archived from the original on 3 October 2008.
- "RIAA Searchable Database: search for "Pyromania"". Recording Industry Association of America. Archived from the original on 28 April 2016.
- Reesman, Bryan. "Virgin Steele Biography". AllMusic. Archived from the original on 14 September 2014.
- "Bodine Biography". Regular Rocker.nl. Archived from the original on 14 June 2015.
- Rivadavia, Eduardo. "Angel Witch Biography". AllMusic. Archived from the original on 19 January 2015.
- Rivadavia, Eduardo. "Aria Biography". AllMusic. Archived from the original on 10 August 2023.
- Rivadavia, Eduardo. "Atomkraft Biography". AllMusic. Archived from the original on 25 July 2012.
- Rivadavia, Eduardo. "A II Z biography". AllMusic. Archived from the original on 27 November 2012.
- Rivadavia, Eduardo. "Black Rose – Boys Will Be Boys review". AllMusic. Archived from the original on 6 October 2015.
- Rivadavia, Eduardo. "Blitzkrieg biography". AllMusic. Archived from the original on 27 June 2012.
- Rivadavia, Eduardo. "Dedringer biography". AllMusic. Archived from the original on 11 March 2016.
- Rivadavia, Eduardo. "Demon biography". AllMusic. Archived from the original on 24 June 2012.
- Rivadavia, Eduardo. "EF Band biography". AllMusic. Archived from the original on 17 November 2015.
- Rivadavia, Eduardo. "Ethel the Frog biography". AllMusic. Archived from the original on 22 February 2013.
- Rivadavia, Eduardo. "Gaskin biography". AllMusic. Archived from the original on 4 January 2013.
- Rivadavia, Eduardo. "Girl Biography". AllMusic. Archived from the original on 27 June 2012.
- Rivadavia, Eduardo. "Grim Reaper biography". AllMusic. Archived from the original on 1 September 2014.
- Rivadavia, Eduardo (20 August 2006). "Handsome Beasts Biography". AllMusic. Archived from the original on 21 February 2013.
- Rivadavia, Eduardo. "Hellion Biography". AllMusic. Archived from the original on 23 July 2013.
- Rivadavia, Eduardo. "Helloween Biography". AllMusic. Archived from the original on 31 July 2018.
- Rivadavia, Eduardo. "Jaguar biography". AllMusic. Archived from the original on 3 March 2013.
- Rivadavia, Eduardo. "Killer Biography". AllMusic. Archived from the original on 27 March 2013.
- Rivadavia, Eduardo. "More biography". AllMusic. Archived from the original on 5 March 2015.
- Rivadavia, Eduardo. "New Wave of British Heavy Metal '79 Revisited review". AllMusic. Archived from the original on 27 June 2012.
- Rivadavia, Eduardo. "Ostrogoth Biography". AllMusic. Archived from the original on 3 April 2018.
- Rivadavia, Eduardo. "Pagan Altar Biography". AllMusic. Archived from the original on 15 March 2016.
- Rivadavia, Eduardo. "Praying Mantis biography". AllMusic. Archived from the original on 12 March 2016.
- Rivadavia, Eduardo. "The Rods Biography". AllMusic. Archived from the original on 25 November 2014.
- Rivadavia, Eduardo. "Saracen Biography". AllMusic. Archived from the original on 25 September 2015.
- Rivadavia, Eduardo. "Saxon Biography". AllMusic. Archived from the original on 13 April 2014.
- Rivadavia, Eduardo. "Tank Biography". AllMusic. Archived from the original on 4 March 2015.
- Rivadavia, Eduardo. "Tygers of Pan Tang – Wild Cat review". AllMusic. Archived from the original on 17 June 2013.
- Rivadavia, Eduardo. "Vardis biography". AllMusic. Archived from the original on 25 September 2015.
- Rivadavia, Eduardo. "White Spirit biography". AllMusic. Archived from the original on 14 March 2016.
- Rivadavia, Eduardo. "Witchfynde biography". AllMusic. Archived from the original on 25 September 2015.
- Rivadavia, Eduardo (24 April 2017). "Top 25 New Wave of British Heavy Metal Albums". Ultimate Classic Rock. Archived from the original on 15 June 2025.
- "About Roadrunner Records". Roadrunner Records. Archived from the original on 10 May 2016.
- "This Is Spinal Tap". Rotten Tomatoes. Archived from the original on 22 March 2020.
- Sharpe-Young, Garry. "Judas Priest". MusicMight. Archived from the original on 13 May 2016.
- Sharpe-Young, Garry (2009). "Saxon". MusicMight. Archived from the original on 17 April 2015.
- Sharpe-Young, Garry. "UFO". MusicMight. Archived from the original on 7 April 2016.
- Shore, Robert (January 2009). "NWOBHM: 30 Years On". Planet Rock. Planetrock.com. Archived from the original on 24 September 2015.
- Smith-Engelhardt, Joe (9 November 2020). "30 metal bands who pioneered heavy music in Latin America". Alternative Press. Archived from the original on 19 August 2022.
- Stein, Lior (9 April 2010). "Yves Campion (Nightmare) interview". Metal Express Radio. Archived from the original on 18 July 2011.
- "Iron Maiden – Killers (Album)". Swedishcharts.com. Archived from the original on 3 May 2021.
- "Saxon – Denim and Leather (Album)". Swedishcharts.com. Archived from the original on 3 May 2021.
- "Tour History". Thin Lizzy Guide.com. Archived from the original on 2 March 2019.
- Vaughan, Andrew (9 June 2010). "Metal Muthas: How the NWOBHM Got its Start". Gibson.com. Archived from the original on 31 May 2016.
- Weber, Barry. "Iron Maiden Biography". AllMusic. Archived from the original on 29 July 2013.
- Weston Thomas, Pauline. "1970s Punk Fashion History Development". Fashion Era.com. Archived from the original on 10 April 2004.
- Wilkinson, Roy (2 January 2009). "And the bands played on ... and on ..." The Guardian. Archived from the original on 27 December 2013.
- Yabroff, Jennie (11 April 2009). ""Spinal Tap" and Its Influence". Newsweek. Archived from the original on 12 September 2019.(registration required)
- "Hit & Run TOTP – Girlschool". YouTube. 30 December 2006.
