= Graeme Crallan =

British drummer (1958–2008)

- Also known as: Crash Crallan
- Born: 5 June 1958; Hartlepool, England
- Died: 27 July 2008 (aged 50) Hampstead, England
- Genres: Heavy metal
- Occupation: Drummer
- Years active: 1975–2008
- Formerly of: White Spirit, Tank

Graeme Crallan (5 June 1958 – 27 July 2008) was a British heavy metal drummer. Also known as Crash Crallan, he formed White Spirit along with Janick Gers in 1975. They released their debut album in 1980. The album flopped and they split up in 1981. Crallan then joined up with Tank in 1984, and played on their Honour & Blood album. He quit the following year.

He relocated to London and played in a few other bands. On 27 July 2008, Crallan died at the Royal Free Hospital in Hampstead after sustaining head injuries after a fall in the streets of London.

== Personal life ==
Graeme attended Technical High School and High Tunstall School in Hartlepool before moving to London in the early 1980s.

Crallan attended the wedding of fellow White Spirit member Malcolm Pearson (keyboard) after the split of the band, undertaking the role of Pearson's best-man.

== Discography ==
=== White Spirit ===
Studio albums

- White Spirit – 1980

Singles

- "Backs to the Grind" – 1980
- "Midnight Chaser" – 1981
- "High Upon High" – 1981

=== Tank ===
- Honour & Blood – 1984
- Live and Rare – 2007
