= Fist (band) =

British heavy metal band

- Origin: South Shields, England
- Genres: Heavy metal
- Years active: 1978–1982; 2001–2006; 2013–present
- Labels: Neat, MCA, Demolition
- Members: Glenn Coates; Dave Irwin; Norman Appleby; Harry Hill
- Past members: John Wylie; Dave Durey; Glenn S Howes; John Roach; Keith Satchfield; Martin Metcalf; Brian Rickman; Steve Ireland; Martin Harrison; Norman Appleby; Steve East

Fist are an English heavy metal band founded in South Shields, North East England in 1978. Fist were one of the original bands that were considered to be part of the new wave of British heavy metal movement in the late 1970s and early 1980s.

== History ==
The band first formed in April 1978 as Axe, but only recorded one song ("S.S. Giro") under that name. The group reformed in late 1979 under the new name of Fist, soon signing with Neat Records and releasing their first single, "Name, Rank and Serial Number" in April 1980. This single did well with heavy radio rotation and good sales. The single was praised in the pages of Sounds, and bigger things were anticipated for the band as they signed with MCA, releasing a second single and preparing a full-length record for the end of the year. Turn the Hell On was released and the band toured with UFO, Judas Priest and Iron Maiden. However, the LP suffered from a poor mix and MCA did not have any real experience of dealing with metal bands and promoted the band poorly. Turn the Hell On failed to satisfy the label sales wise and Fist were dropped by MCA in early 1981.

Apart from a couple of compilation appearances (including the old 1978 Axe recording of "S.S. Giro" showing up on the Neat compilation Lead Weight), Fist went unheard from for a short time, re-vamping the line-up in July 1981 and issuing their second LP, Back with a Vengeance, on Neat in early 1982. This new line-up included lead vocalist Glenn Coates from Hollow Ground, John Roach from Mythra, bassist Norman Appleby as well as Hill and Irwin. Reviews were favourable for this album, with a few minor quibbles about the band sounding "too American" due to Glenn Coates smoother vocals. However, due to limited distribution and scarce label funds the album never took off. The band seemed a little restrained also, mainly gigging locally in the North East of England. Fist went through a few more changes from that point until finally and officially disbanding in 1985.

Despite failing to sell in "significant numbers", Fist were singled out for praise by a number of critics for writing catchy choruses and resisting the clichéd heavy metal lyrics of many other NWOBHM bands, that primarily sang about the occult; "You'll Never Get Me Up (In One of Those)", for example, is about fear of flying, while "Throwing in the Towel" is about an ageing boxer unhappy to be back in the ring. "Name, Rank and Serial Number" in particular is considered an all-time classic by many rock and metal fans.

In 2001, original frontman Keith Satchfield formed a new version of Fist which included members of Hollow Ground as well as guest musicians. This lineup released a new album, Storm, in 2005. The music on this album had a much heavier feel than anything Fist had previously released. The album received a mixed reception, with some camps preferring the older more classic sounding material and other camps criticising the "synthetic" sound of the recordings especially the drums. There was some initial activity with this line-up e.g., a one-off show at Headbangers Open Air in Germany, however, due to ill health, the band remained inactive shortly afterwards and again the album failed to make any major impact.

In 2013, Fist reformed with original members Harry "Hiroshima" Hill, Davey Irwin and Norman Appleby from the Back with Vengeance period. Added to this line-up was new frontman Glenn S. Howes, a veteran of the NWOBHM scene after spending time in the groups Blitzkrieg, Tygers of Pan Tang and Avenger. This line-up debuted at the Bro Fest festival in the UK in 2014, headlining the Friday night to much expectation and excitement. The resulting reviews pouring great admiration for the band and the new formation. Fist continue to play live across the world with this line-up and as of 2015 have rumoured to be writing songs for a new album. In 2016, Norman Appleby was replaced by local bassist Steve East. This lineup played a final gig in South Shields on 1 April 2017, supporting Bernie Torme on the first gig of his Dublin Cowboy tour. Steve East and Glenn S Howes had both previously announced they would leave the band after this gig. Fist will continue with Irwin and Hill being joined by former vocalist Glenn Coates and bass player Norman Appleby.

== Legacy ==
Jack Butler-Terry of Metal Hammer assessed: "Although Fist faded into obscurity, their limited output exemplifies all that was magnificent about the NWOBHM."

== Discography ==
=== Albums ===
- Turn the Hell On (MCA November 1980)
- Back with a Vengeance (Neat 1982)
- Storm (Demolition April 2005)

=== Singles ===
- "Name, Rank and Serial Number" / "You'll Never Get Me Up (In One of Those)" (Neat April 1980 / MCA July 1980)
- "Forever Amber" / "Brain Damage" (MCA August 1980)
- "Collision Course" / "Law of the Jungle" (MCA January 1981)
- "The Wanderer" / "Too Hot" (Neat November 1982)

=== Compilation appearances ===
- "Brain Damage" (Brute Force, MCA September 1980)
- "S.S. Giro" / "Throwing in the Towel" (Lead Weight, Neat May 1981)
- "Lost & Found" (60 Minute Plus Heavy Metal, Neat November 1982)

=== Compilation albums ===
- Back with a Vengeance: The Anthology (Sanctuary 2002)

== See also ==
- New wave of British heavy metal
- List of new wave of British heavy metal bands
