= MusicMight =

Rock music website

- Former name: RockDetector
- Creator: Garry Sharpe-Young
- Website: www.musicmight.com
- Current status: Defunct

MusicMight (formerly RockDetector) was a rock music website that provides artist and product information through a global website and an ongoing book series. Based in New Zealand, the site was founded by British writer Garry Sharpe-Young, and was backed by a small team of international writers who contributed to the site.

== Database contents ==
The database covered many styles and ages of rock music, such as thrash metal, black metal, death metal, radio rock and nu metal. As of December 2007, the database had over 59,400+ bands listed. The site included over 92,000 releases in the database and almost 659,000 songs. The site also had an international concert guide of over 300,000 concerts, archiving from 1965. The site also featured extensive and unique band biographies, many of which were the result of direct, first-hand interviews with band members conducted by Sharpe-Young during his many years as a heavy metal journalist.

Additional features included extensive discographies, pictures of the bands, their logos and their albums covers, upcoming concerts and album reviews.

The site went without updates for some time, bearing a message that a new expanded version of RockDetector is on its way. On 1 September 2008 the site started after more than one year of re-programming and testing with an improved concept, layout, and a re-designed database under the new name Musicmight.com with 60,000 artists and 144,000 persons included in the database.

Sharpe-Young died in March 2010. Site development, expansion and data additions have since halted, and the site was later taken down.

== Growth ==
Date	Artists	Persons	Recordings	Songs
March 2005	30 000			
26 October 2006	50 000			
July 2007	56 500	-	89 500	638 500
December 2007	59 400	-	92 000	659 000
September 2008	60 000	144 012	-	-
4 October 2008	60 774	145 825	-	-
15 March 2009	67 186	156 205	-	-
9 June 2009	70 814		-	-
11 February 2010	208 562	216 645	-	-

== Books ==
- Black Metal – September 2001
- Death Metal – September 2001
- Ozzy Osbourne – February 2002
- Thrash Metal – October 2002
- Power Metal – February 2003
- Doom, Gothic & Stoner Metal – February 2003
- 80s Rock – July 2003
- Black Sabbath – Never Say Die – 2004
- New Wave of American Heavy Metal – November 2005
- Sabbath Bloody Sabbath – The Battle For Black Sabbath – August 2006
- Thrash Metal – Amended – October 2007
- Death Metal – Amended – April 2008
