= Tank (band) =

British heavy metal band

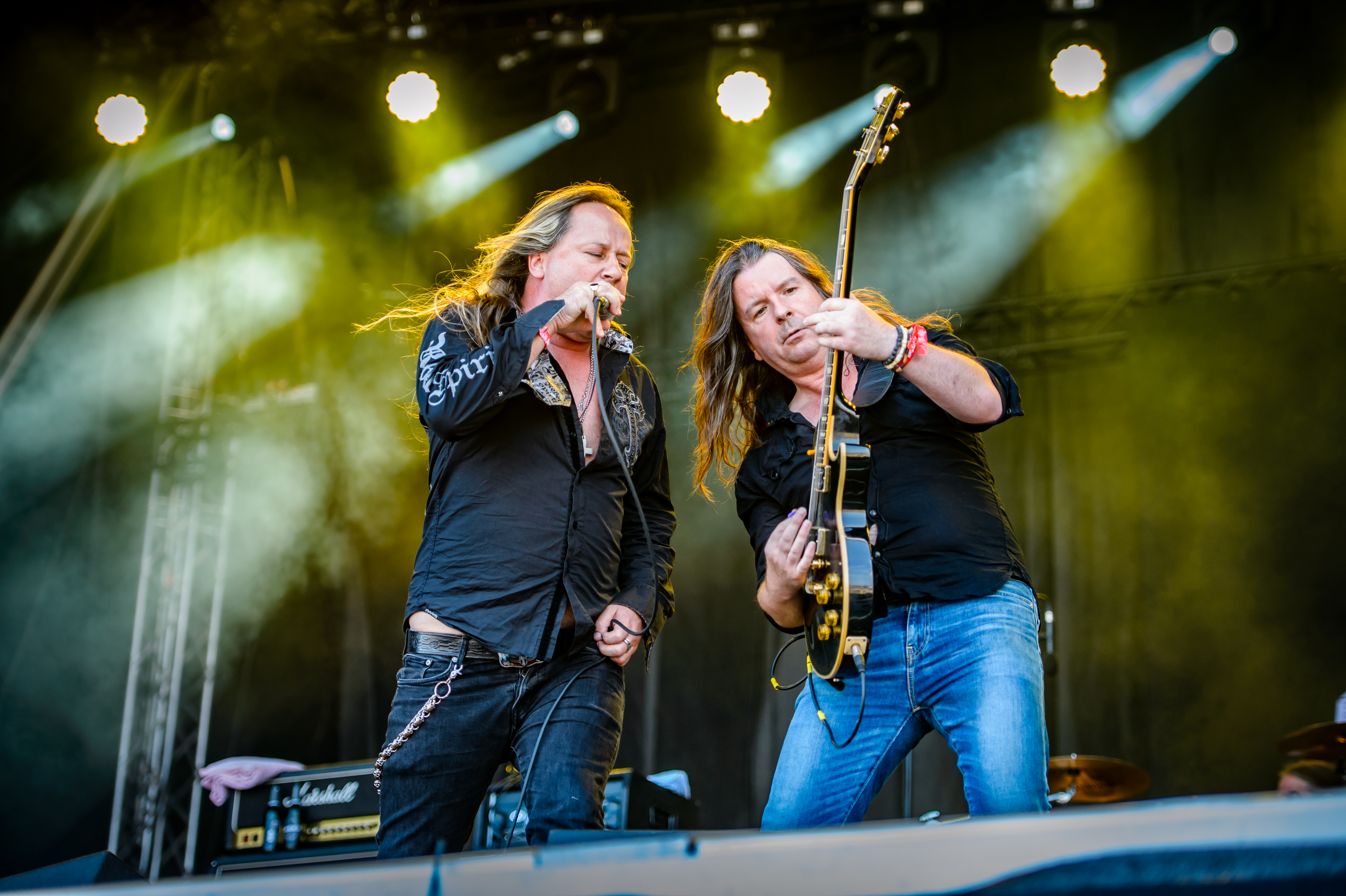
- Tank in 2017

Background information
- Origin: London, England
- Genres: Heavy metal
- Years active: Original Tank: 1980–1989, 1997–2003; Tucker/Evans Tank: 2008–present Algy Ward's Tank: 2013–2023
- Labels: 4Worlds Media, Kamaflage, Music for Nations, Spiritual Beast/Zoom Club
- Members: Mick Tucker; Cliff Evans; Gavin Kerrigan; Karl Wilcox; Marcus von Boisman
- Past members: Algy Ward; Peter Brabbs; Mark Brabbs; Graeme Crallan; Michael Bettel; Gary Taylor; Steve Clarke; Steve Hopgood; Bruce Bisland; Dave "Grav" Cavill; Mark Cross; Doogie White; Chris Dale; Barend Courbois; ZP Theart; Randy van der Elsen; Gav Gray; Bobby Schottkowski; David Readman

Tank (often stylized as TANK) are an English heavy metal band formed in 1980 by Algy Ward, a former member of The Damned. The original band is known as part of the new wave of British heavy metal movement. Tank was often compared to Motörhead as both bands were trios fronted by singing bassists, and played a loose, almost punk-styled metal music with often colourful lyrics.

After acrimonious legal and creative disputes, Algy Ward led one version of the group until his death on 17 March 2023, while guitarists Mick Tucker and Cliff Evans continued to lead another version of the band.

== History ==
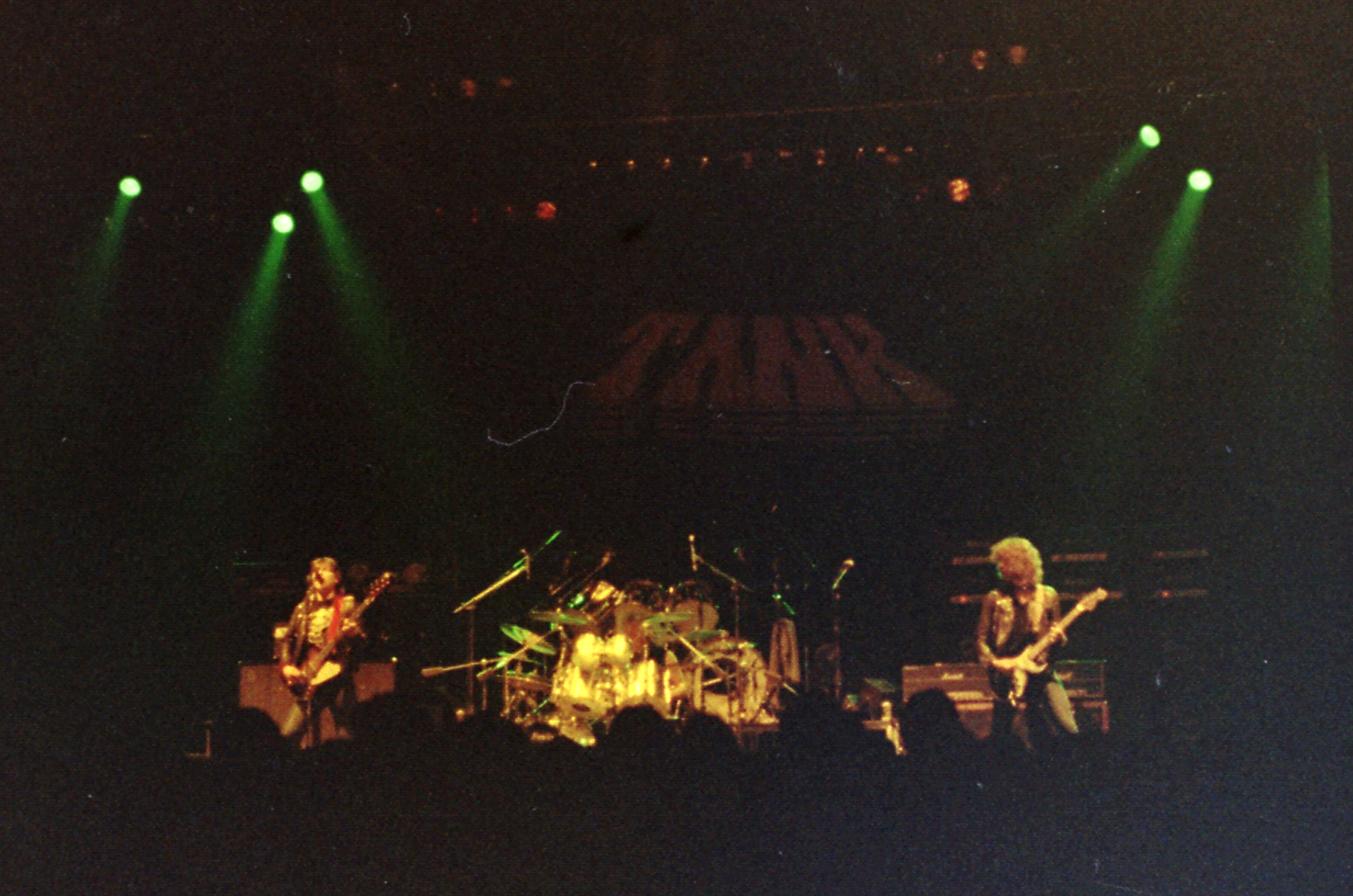
Tank performing live in 1982

Their 1982 debut album, Filth Hounds of Hades, was positively received by both punk and metal fans as well as most critics, regarded now as one of the best albums of the NWOBHM movement. AllMusic critic, Eduardo Rivadavia; described it as "Tank's best album ever, and qualifying it as an essential item in the record collection of any serious '80s metal fan."

As was the case with many other bands of the era, Tank was never able to build on the promise shown by their first album. The band continued on for years through line-up changes and waning commercial fortunes before finally disbanding in 1989. Ward resurrected the band in 1997 playing tour dates around Europe and Japan for a couple of years. Five of their songs appeared on a Japanese compilation called Metal Crusade '99.

The album Still At War emerged in 2002. In August 2006, Ward said that he was working on the next Tank album, Sturmpanzer.

On 20 December 2008, a new line-up was announced. Guitarists Mick Tucker and Cliff Evans were joined by original drummer Mark Brabbs and former Bruce Dickinson bassist Chris Dale. Algy Ward was replaced by former Rainbow singer Doogie White. For 2010, the band replaced Brabbs with Voodoo Six drummer, Dave Cavill and released the new Tank album War Machine, with this line-up in released in October 2010. For 2011, the band replaced Cavill with heavy metal drummer, Mark Cross.

In February 2012, the band announced their first live DVD recorded the previous summer in Poland with additional footage to be recorded in March 2012. The band also released details of the return of former drummer, Steve Hopgood, along with details of the forthcoming album, War Nation. The album was released on 4 June on Metal Mind Productions, produced by Phil Kinman at his west London studios.

In 2013, it emerged that Algy Ward had resurrected his own version of the band, with all tracks on a new album called Breath of the Pit being "written, played and shouted" by Ward himself. According to Algy Ward, Sturmpanzer was to be released sometime in 2015. Tank led by Tucker/Evans was scheduled to release their third album that year as well. The album, called Valley of Tears, was scheduled to be released on 9 June, but was pushed back to 18 September.

In January 2016, Ward stated that Sturmpanzer was finished and would be finally released in early 2016. However, it was later delayed, and finally released in November 2018.

In June 2019, the Tucker-Evans Tank embarked on their debut Australian tour (the first visit of Tank in general to the country), co-headlining with Girlschool and Raven, after Venom Inc. had to pull out for health reasons.

Algy Ward died on 17 May 2023.

In March 2024, the band participated in the Hell's Heroes music festival, which took place at White Oak Music Hall in Houston and was headlined by Sodom and Queensrÿche. They performed a "classic set" for this event.

== Members ==
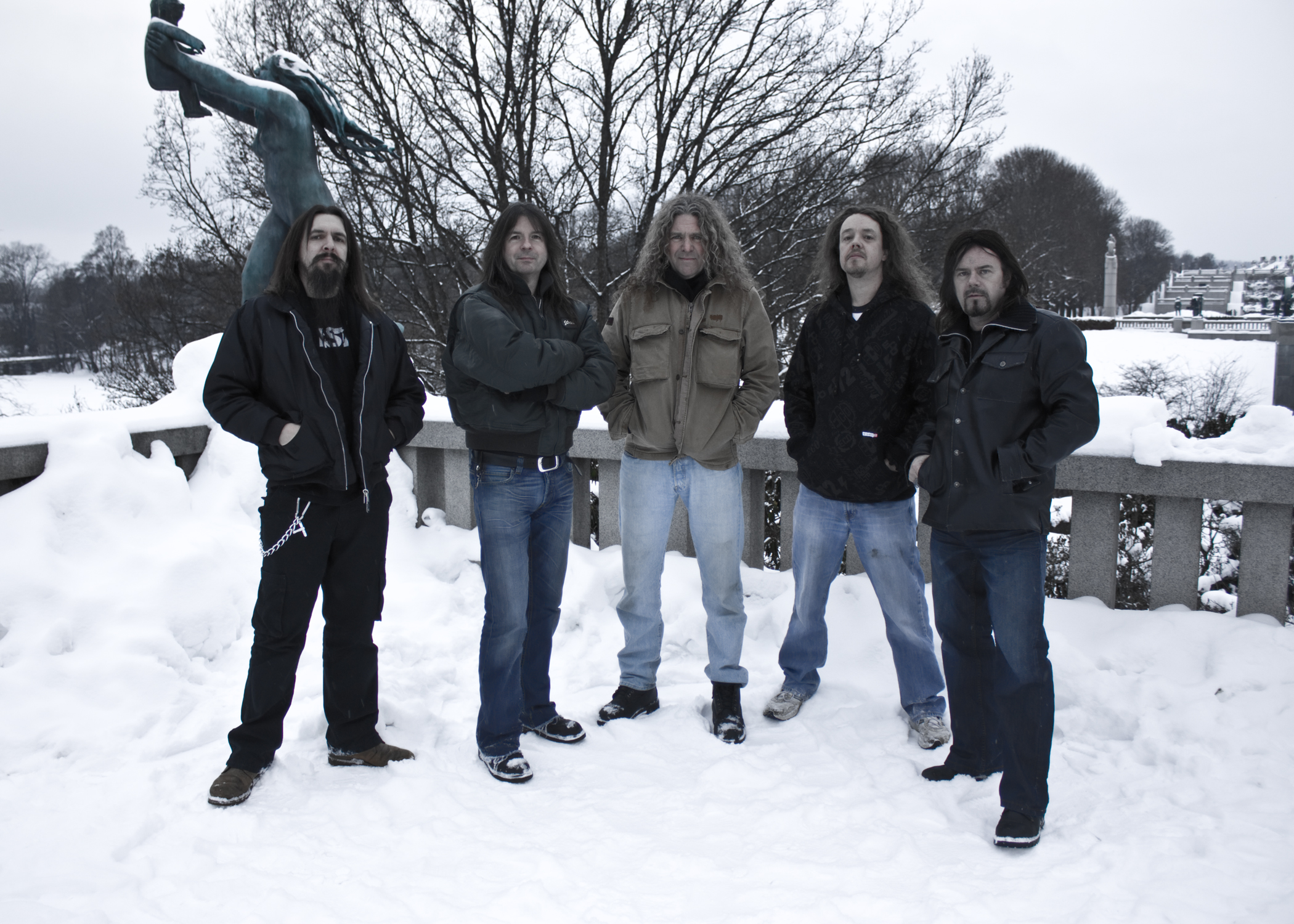
Tank in 2010

- Mick Tucker (1983–1989, 1997–present) – guitar
- Cliff Evans (1984–1989, 1997–present) – guitar
- Karl Wilcox (2024–present) – drums
- Marcus von Boisman (2023–present) – vocals
- Gavin Kerrigan (2025–present) – bass

=== Previous members ===
- Algy Ward (1980–1989, 1997–2008, 2013–2023; died 2023) – vocals, all instruments (2013–2023); vocals, bass (1980–1989, 1997–2008)
- Peter Brabbs (1980–1983; died 2025) – guitar
- Mark Brabbs (1980–1983, 2009) – drums
- Graeme Crallan (1984–1985; died 2008) – drums
- Michael Bettel (1985; died 2003) – drums
- Gary Taylor (1985–1989) – drums
- Steve Clarke (1989) – drums
- Steve Hopgood (1997–2001, 2012–2014) – drums
- Bruce Bisland (2001–2007) – drums
- Dave "Grav" Cavill (2008–2011) – drums
- Mark Cross (2011–2012) – drums
- Doogie White (2008–2014) – vocals
- Chris Dale (2008–2014) – bass
- ZP Theart (2013–2017) – vocals (2014–2017), live vocals (2013–2014) (as touring member)
- Barend Courbois (2014–2017) – bass
- Bobby Schottkowski (2014–2023) – drums
- David Readman (2017–2023) – vocals
- Randy van der Elsen (2017–2023) – bass
- Gav Gray (2023–2025) – bass

== Discography ==
=== Tank ===
==== Albums ====
- Filth Hounds of Hades (1982)
- Power of the Hunter (1982)
- This Means War (1983)
- Honour & Blood (1984)
- Tank (1987)
- Still at War (2002)

==== Singles ====
- "Don't Walk Away" (1981)
- "(He Fell in Love with a) Stormtrooper" (1982)
- "Turn Your Head Around" (1982)
- "Crazy Horses" (1982)
- "Echoes of a Distant Battle" (1983)

==== Compilation and live albums ====
- Armour Plated (1985)
- The Return of the Filth Hounds Live (1998)
- War of Attrition (live '81) (2001)
- The Filth Hounds of Hades - Dogs of War 1981–2002 (2007)

=== Tucker/Evans Tank ===
==== Albums ====
- War Machine (2010)
- War Nation (2012)
- Valley of Tears (2015)
- Re-Ignition (2019)

=== Algy Ward's Tank ===
==== Albums ====
- Breath of the Pit (2013)
- Sturmpanzer (2018)

== See also ==
- New wave of British heavy metal
- List of new wave of British heavy metal bands
