= Geoff Barton =

British journalist

Geoff Barton (born July 1955) is a British journalist who founded the heavy metal magazine Kerrang! and was an editor of Sounds music magazine.

He joined Sounds at the age of 19 after completing a journalism course at the London College of Printing ( now University of the Arts London ). He specialised in covering rock music and helped popularise the new wave of British heavy metal (NWOBHM) after using the term for the first time (after editor Alan Lewis coined it) in the May 1979 issue of Sounds. In 1981 he edited the first issue of Kerrang!, which was published as a one off. This was successful so it became a fortnightly magazine. He left the magazine in 1995.

Barton's articles for Sounds which covered the NWOBHM helped to create the sense that an actual movement was taking place, and in a sense helped to create one in the process. Barton recalls: "The phrase New Wave of British Heavy Metal was this slightly tongue-in-cheek thing...I didn't really feel that any of these bands were particularly linked in a musical way, but it was interesting that so many of them should then be emerging at more or less the same time." He currently works for Classic Rock.
