= 1985 in heavy metal music =

This is a timeline documenting the events of heavy metal in the year 1985.

== Newly formed bands ==
- Acid Reign
- Aftermath
- Agathocles
- Alvacast
- Aria
- Attitude Adjustment
- Atrocity
- Banshee
- Blood Feast
- Britny Fox
- Candlemass
- Carcass
- Chakal
- China
- Cry Wolf
- Dare
- David Lee Roth
- Defiance
- Deliverance
- Diamond Rexx
- Doom
- Dream Theater (under the name "Majesty")
- Drivin N Cryin
- Executer
- Exhorder
- Extreme
- Extreme Noise Terror
- Exumer
- Faster Pussycat
- Fate
- Forbidden
- Fu Manchu
- Goatlord
- Gore
- Guns N' Roses
- Holocausto
- Hunter
- Jane's Addiction
- Juggernaut
- King Diamond
- L7
- Loudblast
- Love/Hate
- Macabre
- Meanstreak
- Mekong Delta
- Morgoth
- Mortal Sin
- Mr. Bungle
- Mutilator
- Neurosis
- Osmi Putnik
- Pentagram Chile
- Poltergeist
- Radiohead
- Rata Blanca
- Sabbat
- Sacred Oath
- Sacred Reich
- Sadistik Exekution
- Sanctuary
- Sarcófago
- Satanic Slaughter
- Screaming Trees
- Sea Hags
- Shadow Gallery
- Shotgun Messiah
- Skin Yard
- Stone
- Stormtroopers of Death
- Tarot (under the name "Purgatory" until record deal)
- Thee Hypnotics
- Tora Tora
- Tormentor
- Toxik
- Tuff
- Vio-lence
- Viper
- White Tiger
- White Zombie
- Whitecross
- Zodiac Mindwarp and the Love Reaction

== Albums & EPs ==
* Lee Aaron - Call of the Wild
- Abattoir - Vicious Attack
- AC/DC - Fly on the Wall
- Accept - Metal Heart
- Acid – Engine Beast
- ADX - Exécution
- Aerosmith - Done with Mirrors
- Agent Steel - Skeptics Apocalypse
- Agent Steel - Mad Locust Rising (EP)
- Alcatrazz - Disturbing the Peace
- Alien Force - Hell And High Water
- Angel Witch - Screamin' 'n' Bleedin'
- Anthem - Anthem
- Anthem - Ready to Ride (EP)
- Anthrax - Armed and Dangerous (EP)
- Anthrax - Spreading the Disease
- Anvil - Backwaxed (comp)
- April Wine - Walking Through Fire
- Aria - Mania Velichia
- Armed Force - Heavy Artillery
- Armored Saint - Delirious Nomad
- Artillery - Fear of Tomorrow
- Assassin (PA) - License to Kill
- Astaroth - The Long Loud Silence (EP)
- Atlain - G.O.E.
- Atomkraft - Future Warriors
- Attack - Return of the Evil
- Attacker - Battle at Helm's Deep
- Autograph - That's the Stuff
- Avalanche (MO) - Pray for the Sinner
- Avenger (UK) - Killer Elite
- Avenger (Ger) - Depraved to Black (EP)
- Avenger (Ger) - Prayers of Steel
- Axewitch - Hooked on High Heels
- Axis (OH) - Slightly Tilted
- Axtion – Look Out For The Night
- Bad Lizard – Power of Destruction
- Bad Steve - Killing the Night
- Barón Rojo - En un lugar de la marcha
- Battle Axe - We're on the Attack
- Bathory - The Return......
- Barren Cross - Believe (EP)
- Beast (Ger) - Like Living In A Cage
- Black Angels – Broken Spell
- Black Angels – Black and White
- Black Hole - Land of Mistery
- Black Knight - Master of Disaster (EP)
- BlackLace - Get It While It's Hot
- Blackmayne - Blackmayne
- Black 'n Blue - Without Love
- Black Rose – Nightmare (EP)
- Black Sheep - Trouble in the Streets
- Black Tears - The Slave
- Blaspheme – Désir de Vampyr
- Blessed Death - Kill or Be Killed
- Blind Fury - Out of Reach
- Blind Vengeance – Blind Vengeance
- Blitzkrieg (UK) - A Time of Changes
- Blitzkrieg (US) - Ready for Action (EP)
- Bloodlust - Guilty as Sin
- Bloody Climax - Back to the Wall
- Bloody Mary - Bloody Mary
- Blue Öyster Cult - Club Ninja
- Bon Jovi - 7800° Fahrenheit
- Brainfever – Face to Face
- Breaker - Dead Rider
- Breathless - Breathless
- Bulldozer - The Day of Wrath
- Buster Brown – Sign of Victory
- Cacumen - Longing for You (EP)
- Carnivore - Carnivore
- Castle Blak - Babes In Toyland
- Celtic Frost - Emperor's Return (EP)
- Celtic Frost - To Mega Therion
- Chastain - Mystery of Illusion
- Chateaux - Highly Strung
- Chrome Molly - You Can't Have It All...or Can You?
- Cities - Annihilation Absolute (EP)
- Cobra (UK) – Warriors of the Dead
- Coney Hatch - Friction
- Convict - Go Ahead... Make My Day!
- Corrosion of Conformity - Animosity
- Crack Jaw - Nightout
- Crisis - Kick It Out
- Crossfire - Second Attack
- Crystal Knight - Crystal Knight
- Crying Steel - Crying Steel (EP)
- The Cult - Love
- Cutty Sark - Heroes
- Dagger – Not Afraid of the Night
- Damien - Face the Danger
- Dark Angel - We Have Arrived
- Dark Lord – State of Rock (EP)
- Dark Wizard - Reign of Evil
- Darxon - Tokyo (EP)
- Ded Engine - Ded Engine
- Demon - British Standard Approved
- Demon - Heart of Our Time
- Der Kaiser – La Griffe de L'Empire
- Destiny - Beyond All Sense
- Destruction - Infernal Overkill
- Destructor - Maximum Destruction
- Devil Childe - Devil Childe
- Dio - Sacred Heart
- Dirty Looks – Dirty Looks
- Divine Rite - First Rite
- Dokken - Under Lock and Key
- Drysill - Welcome to the Show
- Dungeon - Fortress of Rock
- Earthshaker - Passion
- E.F. Band - One Night Stand
- Mark Edwards - Code of Honor (EP)
- Electric Sun - Beyond the Astral Skies
- Elysian - Blinded by Sound
- Emerald - Down Town
- Excalibur (UK) – The Bitter End (EP)
- Exciter – Feel the Knife (EP)
- Exciter - Long Live the Loud
- Exodus - Bonded by Blood
- Fact - Without Warning
- Fate - Fate
- Faithful Breath - Skol
- Faith No More - We Care a Lot
- Fastway - Waiting for the Roar
- Fates Warning - The Spectre Within
- Fierce Heart - Fierce Heart
- Fisc - Break Out
- Fist (Can) - Danger Zone
- Flames (Gre) - Made in Hell
- Flatbacker - Accident
- Foreplay - First Licks
- Fortress - Fortress
- Fortune (band) - Fortune
- Robin George - Dangerous Music
- Girlschool - Running Wild
- Glacier - Glacier (EP)
- Grave Digger - Witch Hunter
- Gravestone – Back to Attack
- Grim Reaper - Fear No Evil
- Guitar Pete's Axe Attack – Dead Soldier's Revenge
- Halloween - Don't Metal with Evil
- Hallows Eve - Tales of Terror
- Hammer - Contract with Hell
- Hammerschmitt - Hammerschmitt
- Hammers Rule - After the Bomb (EP)
- Hatrik - The Beast
- Hanover Fist - Hanover Fist
- Hanover Fist - Hungry Eyes
- Joe Hasselvander - Lady Killer
- Haven - Haven (EP)
- Hawaii - The Natives Are Restless
- Headhunter (Swi) - Headhunter
- Headpins - Head over Heels
- Headstone - Excalibur
- Heavy Pettin – Rock Ain't Dead
- Helix - Long Way to Heaven
- Helloïse - Cosmogony
- Helloween - Helloween (EP)
- Helloween - Walls of Jericho
- Herazz - Yet to Come
- High Tension - Warrior
- Highway Chile - Rockarama
- Hirax - Raging Violence
- Holland - Little Monsters
- Hurricane - Take what you want
- Horizon - Master of the Game
- Hunter (Ger) - Sign of the Hunter
- Hunter (US) - Hunter
- Icon - Night of the Crime
- Impaler - Rise of the Mutants (EP)
- Iron Angel - Hellish Crossfire
- Iron Cross - Warhead
- Iron Maiden - Live After Death
- Jack Starr's Burning Starr - Rock the American Way
- Jade – If You're Man Enough
- Jag Wire - Made in Heaven
- Joshua - Surrender
- Karrier - Way Beyond the Night
- Keel - The Right to Rock
- Keen Hue – Ogre King
- Kerber - Ratne igre
- Kick Axe - Welcome to the Club
- Killers (Fra) - Fils de la Haine
- King Kobra - Ready to Strike
- Kiss - Asylum
- Kix - Midnite Dynamite
- Knightmare II - Death Do Us Part (EP)
- Kreator - Endless Pain
- Lȧȧz Rockit - No Stranger to Danger
- L.A. - L.A.
- L.A. Guns - Collector's Edition No. 1 (EP)
- Labyrinth - So Wild
- Leatherwolf - Leatherwolf, aka Endangered Species
- Leviticus - The Strob¿ngest Power
- Liege Lord - Freedom's Rise
- Living Death - Metal Revolution
- Living Death - Watch Out! (EP)
- Lions Breed - Damn the Night
- Lizzy Borden - Love You to Pieces
- London - Non-Stop Rock
- Loudness - Thunder in the East
- Luzbel - Metal Caído Del Cielo (EP)
- Lynx - Caught in the Trap
- M-80 - Maniac's Revenge
- Mace (WA) - Process of Elimination
- Mad Butcher - Metal Lightning Attack
- Mad Max - Stormchild
- Magnum - On a Storyteller's Night
- Maineeaxe - Going for Gold
- Maineeaxe - The Hour of Thunder (EP)
- Malice - In the Beginning...
- Mama's Boys - Power and Passion
- Maniac - Maniac
- Manilla Road - Open the Gates
- Martyr - For the Universe
- Mass (MA) - New Birth
- Maxx Warrior - Maxx Warrior (EP)
- Megadeth - Killing Is My Business... And Business Is Good!
- Mercy - Witchburner
- Metal Massacre - Metal Massacre VI (Compilation, various artists)
- Midnight Darkness - Holding the Night
- Mistreater - Mistreater
- Gary Moore - Run for Cover
- Morsüre – Acceleration Process
- Mötley Crüe - Theatre of Pain
- Mournblade - Time's Running Out
- Mox Nix - Mox Nix
- Nasty Savage - Nasty Savage
- Nation (Ger) - Ride On
- Nightmare – Power of the Universe
- Nightwing – A Night of Mystery - Alive! Alive! (live)
- Ninja - The Warriors of Rock
- Obús - Pega con fuerza
- Odin - Don't Take No... For an Answer (EP)
- Omega - The Prophet
- Omen - Warning of Danger
- Overdose - Tight Action
- Overdose - To the Top
- Overkill - Feel the Fire
- Overkill (CA) - Triumph of the Will
- Onslaught - Power from Hell
- Ostrogoth - Too Hot
- Pandemonium - Hole in the Sky
- Paganini - Weapon of Love
- Pantera - I Am the Night
- Paradoxx - Plan of Attak (EP)
- Pentagram - Pentagram, aka Relentless
- Phantom Lord - Phantom Lord
- Phasslayne - Cut It Up
- Philadelphia - Search and Destroy
- Possessed - Seven Churches
- Precious Metal - Right Here, Right Now
- Prophacy - Rock 'n' Roll Nightmare
- Prophet - Prophet
- Rail - III
- Railway - Railway II
- Ran – Burning
- Ratt - Invasion of Your Privacy
- Raven - Stay Hard
- Razor - Executioner's Song
- Razor - Evil Invaders
- Restless (Ger) - We Rock the Nation
- Kelle Rhoads - Cheap Talkin' Romance (EP)
- Rogue Male - First Visit
- Romeo - Rocks (EP)
- Rosy Vista - You Better Believe It (EP)
- David Lee Roth - Crazy from the Heat (EP)
- Rough Cutt - Rough Cutt
- Ruffians - Ruffians (EP)
- Runestaff – Runestaff
- Running Wild - Branded and Exiled
- Rush - Power Windows
- Sabre (Ger) - Keepers of the Sword
- Sabre (Can) - On the Prowl
- Sacred Few - Beyond the Iron Walls
- Sacred Rite - The Ritual
- Sacrifice (Swi) - On the Altar of Rock
- Sacrilege – Behind the Realms of Madness
- Sadwings - Lonely Hero
- Saigon - One Must Die
- Saints' Anger – Danger Metal
- Saint Vitus - Hallow's Victim
- Satanic Rites - Which Way the Wind Blows
- Savage - Hyperactive
- Savage Grace - Master of Disguise
- Savatage – The Dungeons Are Calling (EP)
- Savatage – Power of the Night
- Saxon - Innocence Is No Excuse
- Scarlet - Phantasm
- Scavenger - Battlefields
- Scorpions - World Wide Live
- Seduce - Seduce
- Seducer - Caught in the Act
- Shere Khan - Quite Enough for Love
- Sinner - Touch of Sin
- Silver Mountain - Universe
- Slauter Xstroyes - Winter Kill
- Slaven - Slave To The Heart (EP)
- Slayer - Hell Awaits
- Sodom - In the Sign of Evil (EP)
- Spectre (CA) - Lady of the Night
- Spellbound - Rockin' Reckless
- Stainless Steel (Ger) - Stainless Steel
- Stators - ...Never Too Late
- Steel Angel – ...And the Angels Were Made of Steel
- Steeler (Ger) - Rulin' the Earth
- Steel Vengeance - Call Off the Dogs
- Stormtrooper (US) - Armies of the Night (EP)
- S.O.D. - Speak English or Die
- Stormwind (Ger) - Taken by Storm
- Stormwitch - Tales of Terror
- Stranger - The Bell
- Stryker (FL) - Stryker
- Stryper - Soldiers Under Command
- Sweethard - Sweethard
- Sweet Pain - Sweet Pain
- Sweet Savage (US) – Sweet Savage (EP)
- Sye - Turn on the Fire
- Talon - Never Look Back
- Terraplane – Black and White
- Thor - Only the Strong
- Thor - Live in Detroit (live)
- Thrasher - Burning at the Speed of Light
- Titanic - Then There Was Rock
- Tokyo Blade - Black Hearts & Jaded Spades
- Tobruk (UK) - Wild on the Run
- Touchdown - Tricks of a Trade
- Trance – Victory
- Trilogy (Aus) - Life on Earth
- Tröjan - Chasing the Storm
- Trouble - The Skull
- Trouble (Swe) - Warrior
- Twisted Sister - Come Out and Play
- 220 Volt - Mind over Muscle
- Tygers of Pan Tang - The Wreck-Age
- Tyran' Pace - Long Live Metal
- Tyrant (Ger) - Fight for Your Life
- Tyrant (US) - Legions of the Dead
- Tysondog - Shoot to Kill (EP)
- Tytan - Rough Justice
- Tzar (Can) – Players of the Game
- UFO - Misdemeanor
- Universe - Universe
- Vampyr - Cry Out for Metal
- Vanadium - On Streets of Danger (live)
- Vandenberg - Alibi
- Vectom - Speed Revolution
- Venom - Possessed
- Vicious Rumors - Soldiers of the Night
- Victim (CA) - DMN
- Victory - Victory
- Virgin Steele - Noble Savage
- Vitriol - The Beginning
- Vow Wow - Cyclone
- Vulcain - La dame de fer (EP)
- Vulcain - Desperados
- Vyper - Afraid of the Dark (EP)
- W.A.S.P. - The Last Command
- Wallop - Metallic Alps
- Warchylde - Murder by Decibels
- Warfare - Metal Anarchy
- Warlock - Hellbound
- Warrant - First Strike (EP)
- Warrant - The Enforcer
- Warrior - Fighting for the Earth
- Watchtower - Energetic Disassembly
- Waysted - The Good the Bad the Waysted
- White Heat – Runnin' for Life
- White Lion - Fight to Survive
- Wild Cat - Love Attack
- Winged Messenger - Guardians of Eternity
- Witch (OH) - Salem's Rise
- Wizard - Marlin, Grog, Madman & The Bomb
- World War III (PA) – World War III
- Wrathchild (UK) - Trash Queens (comp)
- Xxaron - The Legacy
- Y&T - Open Fire (live)
- Y&T - Down for the Count
- Yngwie Malmsteen - Marching Out
- Zero Nine – White Lines
- Zoetrope - Amnesty
- Znowhite - Kick 'Em When They're Down EP

== Disbandments ==
- Wild Strawberries (reformed in 1987)
- Mercyful Fate (reformed in 1992)
- Van Halen (Roth quits band)

== Events ==
- Living Colour guitarist Vernon Reid cofounds the Black Rock Coalition, a non-profit organization dedicated to promoting the creative freedom and works of black musicians interested in playing rock music.
- Twisted Sister's Dee Snider testifies at The Parents Music Resource Center Senate hearings on rock censorship at Washington, D.C., on September 19, 1985.
- David Lee Roth releases his solo debut (EP) Crazy from the Heat in January 1985. With it comes the announcement he has permanently left Van Halen.
- Black Sabbath reunites at Live Aid with Ozzy Osbourne.
- Led Zeppelin reunites at Live Aid with Phil Collins replacing deceased drummer John Bonham.
- Kam Lee leaves Death and Chuck Schuldiner becomes the vocalist.
- Uriah Heep's former lead singer, David Byron dies on February 28, due to alcohol complications.
- Welcome to Venice compilation is released, featuring Suicidal Tendencies, Beowulf, and others, showing the growing crossover trend among the Venice Beach hardcore and metal scenes.

Preceded by 1984	Heavy Metal Timeline; 1985	Succeeded by 1986
