= 1984 in heavy metal music =

This is a timeline documenting the events of heavy metal in the year 1984.

== Events ==
- October 23 – A debate over heavy metal music occurs on SVT's Svar direkt between Anders Tegnér and Siewert Öholm.

== Newly formed bands ==
- Agent Steel
- Angel Dust
- Annihilator
- Atheist
- Barren Cross
- The Black Crowes
- Blasphemy
- Blind Guardian (under the name "Lucifer's Heritage" until 1988)
- Bloodgood
- Candlemass
- Celtic Frost
- Chastain
- Chrome Molly
- Concrete Sox
- Cranium
- The Crucified
- Cryptic Slaughter
- Dead End
- Deathrow
- Deceased
- Detente
- Deviated Instinct
- Dirty Looks
- Domine
- Enuff Z'Nuff
- Eudoxis
- Executioner
- Faith
- Fantom Warior
- The Firm
- FM
- Frehley's Comet
- The Front
- Grinder
- Gwar
- Heathen
- Héroes del Silencio
- Hellbastard
- Heller
- Helloween
- Heretic
- Hirax
- Hittman
- Iced Earth
- Jack Starr's Burning Starr
- Jesters of Destiny
- Keel
- King Kobra
- KMFDM
- Korrozia Metalla
- Krabathor
- Kraken
- Leeway
- Living Colour
- Lobotomia
- Los Cycos
- Ludichrist
- Tony MacAlpine
- Massacre
- Mayhem
- Mefisto
- Messiah
- Mistrust
- Morbid Saint
- Mordred
- Necrodeath
- Nepal
- Nuclear Assault
- Obituary
- Phenomena
- Piledriver
- Powermad
- Praxis
- Primus
- The Quireboys
- Racer X
- Rage (under the name "Avenger" until 1986)
- Repulsion
- Sacrilege
- Sadus
- Sepultura
- Slaughter
- Soundgarden
- Starship
- Steel Prophet
- Stratovarius
- Tangier
- Thanatos
- Uncle Slam (known as The Brood until 1987)
- Vendetta
- Victory
- Vinnie Vincent Invasion
- Warfaze
- Warrant
- Whiplash
- Wolfsbane
- Xentrix

== Reformed bands ==
- Deep Purple

== Bands disbanded ==
- Gordi

== Albums & EPs ==
- Lee Aaron - Metal Queen
- AC/DC - '74 Jailbreak (EP)
- Alcatrazz - Live Sentence (live)
- Angeles del Infierno - Pacto con el Diablo
- The Angels, aka Angel City - Two Minute Warning
- Anthrax - Fistful of Metal
- Antix - Get Up, Get Happy (EP)
- April Wine - Animal Grace
- Armed Forces - Let There Be Metal (EP)
- Armored Saint - March of the Saint
- ATC - Cut in Ice
- Atlain - Living in the Dark
- Attack - Danger in the Air
- Attentat Rock – Le Gang des Saigneurs
- Autograph - Sign In Please
- Avenger (UK) - Blood Sports
- Axe Victims - Another Victim
- Axe Witch - Visions of the Past
- Baby Tuckoo - First Born
- Bachman-Turner Overdrive - "Bachman-Turner Overdrive"
- Backwater - Revelation
- Banzai - Duro y Potente
- Barón Rojo - Barón Al Rojo Vivo (live)
- Bathory - Bathory
- Battleaxe - Power from the Universe
- Black Death - Black Death
- Black Lace - Unlaced
- Black 'n Blue - Black 'n Blue
- The Black Riders - The Chosen Few
- Black Rose - Boys Will Be Boys
- Black Rose - Black Rose (EP)
- Black Tears – Child of the Storm
- Blackout - Evil Game
- Blade Runner – Hunted
- Blaspheme – Blaspheme
- Bloody Six - In the Name of Blood
- Blue Cheer - "The Beast Is Back"
- Bon Jovi - Bon Jovi
- Boss - Step on It
- Brainfever – Capture the Night
- Brocas Helm - Into Battle
- Bronz – Taken by Storm
- Brooklyn Brats - Brooklyn Brats (EP)
- Buster Brown – Loud and Clear
- Buzzard (Bel) - Gambler
- Cacumen - Down to Hell
- Celtic Frost - Morbid Tales
- Chariot - The Warrior
- Charon – Charon
- Chateaux - Fire Power
- Childhood's End - Childhood's End (EP)
- Chinawite - Run for Cover
- Cirith Ungol - King of the Dead
- Cloven Hoof - Cloven Hoof
- Corrosion of Conformity - Eye for an Eye
- Crisis - Armed to the Teeth (EP)
- Crossfire - See You in Hell
- Crown - Red Zone
- Crown - All That Rock & Roll Music
- Crystal Pride – Knocked Out (EP)
- Crystal Pride – Crystal Pride
- The Cult - Dreamtime
- Cutty Sark - Die Tonight
- Dark Age (US) - Dark Age (EP)
- Dark Heart - Shadows of the Night
- Dark Wizard - Devil's Victim (EP)
- Darxon – Killed in Action
- D.D.T. – Let The Screw...Turn You On (EP)
- Deep Purple - Perfect Strangers
- Demon - Wonderland (EP)
- Demon Eyes - Rites of Chaos
- Denigh – Fire from the Sky
- Der Kaiser – Vautours
- Destruction - Sentence of Death (EP)
- Di'Anno - Di'Anno
- Dio - The Last in Line
- Divine Rite - First Rite
- Dokken - Tooth and Nail
- Electric Eels (CA) - Electric Eels
- Elessar - Defy the King (EP)
- Earthshaker - Fugitive
- Earthshaker - Midnight Flight
- Eric Steel - Eric Steel
- Europe - Wings of Tomorrow
- Evil - Evil's Message (EP)
- Exciter - Violence & Force
- Explorer - Exploding
- Exxplorer - Symphonies of Steel
- Ezy Meat - Not for Wimps
- Fact – As a Matter of Fact
- Faithful Breath - Gold 'n' Glory
- Fastway - All Fired Up
- Fates Warning - Night on Bröcken
- First Strike – Rock of Offense
- Fisc - Tracker
- FN Guns - Nightmare
- Force – Set Me Free
- Flatbacker - Minagoroshi
- Lita Ford - Dancin' on the Edge
- Rhett Forrester - Gone with the Wind
- Gilgamesj - Take One (EP)
- Glory Bells - Century Rendezvous
- Gotham City - The Unknown
- Grave Digger - Heavy Metal Breakdown
- Graven Image - People in Hell Want Ice Water (EP)
- Gravestone – Victim of Chains
- Great White - Great White
- Griffin - Flight of the Griffin
- Sammy Hagar - VOA
- Hammerhead - Heart Made of Steel (EP)
- Hammers Rule - Show No Mercy
- Hanoi Rocks - All Those Wasted Years (live)
- Hanoi Rocks - Two Steps from the Move
- Hardline (Nor) - Hardline
- Hardware - Common Time Heroes
- Hawaii - Loud, Wild and Heavy (EP)
- Hazzard - Hazzard
- H-Bomb - Attaque
- Headstone - Burning Ambition
- Helix - Walkin' the Razor's Edge
- Hellanbach - The Big H
- Hellhammer - Apocalyptic Raids (EP)
- Hellion (NY) - Dangerous Maneuvers
- Helstar - Burning Star
- Hexx - No Escape
- Highway Chile - For the Wild and Lonely (EP)
- Hiroshima – Taste of Death
- Hocculta – Warning Games
- Holland (UK) – Early Warning
- Holocaust - No Man's Land
- Icon - Icon
- Incubus (UK) - To the Devil a Daughter
- Ironcross - Steel Warrior
- Iron Maiden - Powerslave
- Jag Panzer - Ample Destruction
- Jaguar - This Time
- Albert Järvinen Band – Countdown (EP)
- Judas Priest - Defenders of the Faith
- Keel - Lay Down the Law
- Kick Axe - Vices
- Killer (Swi) - Stronger Than Ever
- Killer (Bel) - Shock Waves
- Kiss - Animalize
- Krokus - The Blitz
- Lȧȧz Rockit - City's Gonna Burn
- Lazy - Creature
- Leatherwolf - Leatherwolf (EP)
- Le Griffe - Breaking Strain (EP)
- Legs Diamond - Out on Bail
- Leviticus - I Shall Conquer
- Limelight - Ashes to Ashes, aka Limelight (1980)
- Living Death - Vengeance of Hell
- Lizzy Borden - Give 'Em the Axe (EP)
- Loudness - Disillusion
- Madam X - We Reserve the Right
- Mad Axeman - Mad Axeman
- Mad Max - Rollin' Thunder
- Madd Hatter - Madd Hatter
- Madison - Diamond Mistress
- Maineeaxe - Shout It Out
- Yngwie Malmsteen - Rising Force
- Maltese Falcon – Metal Rush
- Mama's Boys - Mama's Boys
- Manowar - Hail to England
- Manowar - Sign of the Hammer
- Marseille – Touch the Night
- Mass (Ger) - War Law
- McCoy – Think Hard
- Medieval Steel - Medieval Steel (EP)
- Mercy - Mercy
- Mercyful Fate - Don't Break the Oath
- Messiah (US) - Final Warning
- Messiah Prophet - Rock the Flock
- Metal Church - Metal Church
- Metal Massacre - Metal Massacre V (Compilation, various artists)
- Metallica - Ride the Lightning
- Millennium - Millennium
- Gary Moore - We Want Moore! (live)
- Motörhead - No Remorse (comp)
- MSG - Rock Will Never Die (live)
- Nemesis - The Day of Retribution (EP)
- Mystery Blue - Mystery Blue
- New York – Carry the Torch (EP)
- Nightmare – Waiting for the Twilight
- Nightwing – My Kingdom Come
- Obsession - Marshall Law (EP)
- Obús - El Que Más
- Omen - Battle Cry
- Ostrogoth - Ecstasy and Danger
- Overdrive - Swords and Axes
- Overkill - Overkill (EP)
- Oz - III Warning
- Pantera - Projects in the Jungle
- Parasite - Parasite EP
- Persian Risk – Too Different (EP)
- Pet Hate – The Bride Wore Red
- Phenomena – Phenomena
- Philadelphia - Tell the Truth...
- Picture - Traitor
- Piledriver - Metal Inquisition
- Pretty Maids - Red Hot and Heavy
- Prophecy - Prophecy
- Proud - Fire Breaks the Dawn
- Q5 - Steel the Light
- Queen - The Works
- Queensrÿche - The Warning
- Quiet Riot - Condition Critical
- Rail - Rail (EP)
- Railway - Railway
- Rapid Tears - Cry for Mercy (EP)
- Ratt - Out of the Cellar
- Raven - Live at the Inferno (live)
- Ravens - Get It in Your Head
- Razor - Armed & Dangerous (EP)
- Reckless - Heart of Steel
- Restless (Ger) - Heartattack
- Rising Power - Power for the People
- The Rods - Let Them Eat Metal
- Rosa Negra (Spain) - Rosa Negra
- Rose Bayonet - Leather and Chains
- Rose Tattoo - Southern Stars
- Ruffkut - Fight for the Right (EP)
- Running Wild - Gates to Purgatory
- Rush - Grace Under Pressure
- Ruthless - Metal Without Mercy (EP)
- S.A.D.O. - Shout!
- Sacred Rite - Sacred Rite
- Sad Iron - Total Damnation
- Saint - Warriors of the Son (EP)
- Saint Vitus - Saint Vitus
- Samain - Vibrations of Doom
- Sam Thunder - Manoeuvres
- Samurai – Sacred Blade
- Santers – Guitar Alley
- Saracen – Change of Heart
- Satan Jokers - Trop Fou Pour Toi
- Samson - Don't Get Mad, Get Even
- Savage – We Got the Edge (EP)
- Saxon - Crusader
- Scorpions - Love at First Sting
- Shire - Shire (EP)
- Shok Paris - Go for the Throat
- Silver Mountain - Universe
- Sinister Angel - Sinister Angel (EP)
- Sinner - Danger Zone
- Six Feet Under (Swe) - Eruption
- Six Point Six - Fallen Angel
- Slayer - Haunting the Chapel (EP)
- Slayer - Live Undead (live)
- Smack - Smack On You
- Sortilège - Métamorphose
- Sound Barrier - Born to Rock (EP)
- Spartan Warrior - Spartan Warrior
- Spellbound - Breaking the Spell
- Spinal Tap - This Is Spinal Tap
- Splitcrow - Rockstorm
- Jack Starr - Out of the Darkness
- Steeler (Ger) - Steeler
- Steelover - Glove Me
- Steeltower - Night of the Dog
- The Sterling Cooke Force – Full Force
- Stone Fury - Burns Like a Star
- Stormwitch - Walpurgis Night
- Stratus – Throwing Shapes
- Street Fighter - Shoot You Down
- Strike (US) – Strike (EP)
- Strike (Swe) – Strike (EP)
- Strike Force - Strike Force
- Stryper - The Yellow and Black Attack
- Stygian Shore - Stygian Shore (EP)
- Surrender - Surrender
- Swift Kick - Long Live Rock (EP)
- Syar - Death Before Dishonour
- Syron Vanes – Bringer of Evil
- Taist of Iron - Resurrection
- Talon - Neutralized
- Tank - Honour & Blood
- Teeze (PA) - Teeze
- Third Stage Alert - Third Stage Alert (EP)
- Thrust - Fist Held High
- Thunder (Ger) - All I Want
- Thundercraaft - Fighting for Survival
- Thunderstick – Beauty and the Beasts
- TKO - In Your Face
- TNT (Ger) - Deflorator
- TNT – TNT (EP)
- TNT - Knights of the New Thunder
- Tokyo Blade - Night of the Blade
- Tokyo Blade - Midnight Rendezvous (EP)
- Torch - Bad Girls (EP)
- Torch - Electrikiss
- Bernie Tormé – Live
- Touchdown – Don't Look Down
- Touched – Back Alley Vices
- Trauma - Scratch and Scream
- Triumph - Thunder Seven
- Trouble - Psalm 9
- Trouble - Assassin (EP)
- Trust - Man's Trap
- T.T. Quick - TT Quick (EP)
- Twisted Sister - Stay Hungry
- 220 Volt - Powergames
- Tyran' Pace - Eye to Eye
- Tyrant (Ger) - Mean Machine
- Tysondog - Beware of the Dog
- Tyton - Castle Donington
- Underdog - Rabies in Town
- Upper Echelon - Surface Tension (EP)
- Steve Vai - Flex-Able
- Valhalla (US) - Valhalla (EP)
- Vanadium - Game Over
- Van Halen - 1984
- Vengeance (Hol) - Vengeance
- Venom - At War with Satan
- Vice (CA) - Vice (EP)
- Vigilants – Run for Cover
- Virgin - Virgin
- Viva - Apocalypse
- Voivod - War and Pain
- Vow Wow - Beat of Metal Motion
- Vulcain - Rock'n'Roll Secours
- Warfare - Pure Filth
- Warhead (Bel) - Speedway
- Warlock - Burning the Witches
- Warlord - Lost and Lonely Days (EP)
- Warlord - And the Cannons of Destruction Have Begun...
- Warning - Metamorphose
- Warriors - Warriors
- W.A.S.P. - W.A.S.P.
- Wasted - Halloween... the Night Of
- Waysted - Waysted (EP)
- White Wolf - Standing Alone
- Whitesnake - Slide It In
- Wild Dogs - Man's Best Friend
- Wildfire - Summer Lightning
- Winterkat – The Struggle (EP)
- Witch - The Hex Is On (EP)
- Witch Cross - Fit for Fight
- Witchfynde - Lords of Sin & Anthems live (EP)
- Witchkiller - Day of the Saxons (EP)
- Wizz - Crazy Games
- Wolf - Edge of the World
- Wendy O. Williams - WOW
- Wrathchild (UK) - Stakk Attakk
- Wyzard - Knights of Metal (EP)
- Xcursion - Ready to Roll
- Y&T - In Rock We Trust
- Zebra - No Tellin' Lies
- Znowhite - All Hail to Thee (EP)

== Events ==
- Def Leppard's drummer Rick Allen loses his left arm in a car accident on December 31.
- Deep Purple reunite.
- Hanoi Rocks drummer Razzle is killed in an automobile accident in early December. The driver of the car is Vince Neil of Mötley Crüe.
- The debut albums of both Saint Vitus (Saint Vitus) and Trouble (Psalm 9) are released.
- This Is Spinal Tap, a cult mockumentary directed by Rob Reiner about the semi-fictional band Spinal Tap, is released.

Preceded by 1983	Heavy Metal Timeline; 1984	Succeeded by 1985
