= 1983 in heavy metal music =

This is a timeline documenting the events of heavy metal in 1983.

== Newly formed bands ==
- Alcatrazz
- Alisa
- Artch
- Assassin
- Autograph
- Bad News
- Bad Steve
- Bathory
- Bon Jovi
- Bride
- Carnivore
- Child'ƨ Play
- Coroner
- The Cult
- Darxon
- Death (known as Mantas until 1984)
- The Dogs D'Amour
- Elixir
- Excel (known as Chaotic Noise until 1985)
- Fastway
- Fifth Angel
- Forced Entry
- Gastunk
- Hagar Schon Aaronson Shrieve
- Halloween
- Heir Apparent
- Hurricane
- Impaler
- Jetboy
- Kabát
- King Kobra
- Korzus
- Lillian Axe
- Lion
- Lizzy Borden
- L.A. Guns
- Malhavoc
- Master
- Megadeth
- Melvins
- Michael W. Smith
- Mind Over Four
- Morbid Angel
- MX
- My Bloody Valentine
- Nasty Savage
- Necronomicon
- Necrophagia
- Nothing Sacred
- Omen
- Parabellum
- Poison
- Possessed
- Q5
- Razor
- Red Hot Chili Peppers
- Renegade
- Rigor Mortis
- Rogue Male
- Run-DMC
- S.O.B.
- Sacrifice
- Samhain
- Santa
- Shy
- Stratus
- Stryper
- Taramis
- Testament (known as Legacy until 1986)
- Tigertailz
- Titan Force
- Trixter
- Vader
- Vengeance
- Warrant
- White Lion

== Albums & EPs ==
- AC/DC – Flick of the Switch
- Accept – Balls to the Wall
- Ace Lane – See You In Heaven
- Acid – Maniac
- Alcatrazz – No Parole from Rock N' Roll
- Alice Cooper – DaDa
- Alien (US) – Cosmic Fantasy (EP)
- The Angels, aka Angel City – Watch the Red
- Anvil – Forged in Fire
- Argus - Argus (EP)
- Armored Saint – Armored Saint (EP)
- Ashbury – Endless Skies
- Atomic Rooster – 'Headline News
- Axe Witch - The Lord of Flies
- Barón Rojo – Metalmorfosis
- Battleaxe – Burn This Town
- Billy Idol - Rebel Yell
- Bitch – Be My Slave
- Bitches Sin – No More Chances (EP)
- Black Angels – Kickdown
- Blackfoot – Siogo
- Black Sabbath – Born Again
- Blowin Free - Enemy
- Blue Öyster Cult – The Revölution by Night
- Bodine – Three Times Running
- Bow Wow – Holy Expedition - Live
- Bullet (Ger) – No Mercy
- Cacumen – Bad Widow
- Chateaux – Chained and Desperate
- Cobra – First Strike
- Coney Hatch – Outta Hand
- Culprit – Guilty as Charged!
- Cutty Sark – Hardrock Power (EP)
- Dark Lord – Dark Lord (EP)
- Dedringer – Second Arising
- Def Leppard – Pyromania
- Demon – The Plague
- Diamond Head – Canterbury
- Dio – Holy Diver
- Dokken – Breaking the Chains (US release)
- Earthshaker – Earthshaker
- Easy Action – Easy Action
- Europe – Europe
- Exciter – Heavy Metal Maniac
- Fastway – Fastway
- Fighter – No Pain No Gain
- Fist (Can) – In the Red
- Lita Ford – Out for Blood
- Girlschool – Play Dirty
- Gotham City - Black Writs (EP)
- Grand Prix - Samurai
- Great White – Out of the Night (EP)
- Grim Reaper – See You in Hell
- HSAS – Through the Fire
- Hanoi Rocks – Back to Mystery City
- Hawaii – One Nation Underground
- H-Bomb – Coup de Metal (EP)
- Headpins – Line of Fire
- Heavy Load – Stronger Than Evil
- Heavy Pettin – Lettin' Loose
- Hellanbach – Now Hear This
- High Power – High Power
- Highway Chile – Storybook Heroes
- Highway Chile – Fever (EP)
- Helix – No Rest for the Wicked
- Hellion – Hellion (EP)
- Holocaust – Live (Hot Curry & Wine)
- Iron Maiden – Piece of Mind
- Jade – Teasing Eyes
- Jag Panzer – Tyrants (EP)
- Joshua – The Hand Is Quicker Than the Eye (EP)
- Key West - First Invasion
- Killer (Swi) – Stronger Than Ever
- Killer Dwarfs – Killer Dwarfs
- Kiss – Lick It Up
- KIX – Cool Kids
- Krokus – Headhunter
- Lady Killer – Lady Killer
- Leather Angel – We Came to Kill (EP)
- Le Griffe – Fast Bikes (EP)
- Le Mans – On the Streets
- Greg Leon Invasion - Greg Leon Invasion
- Loudness – The Law of Devil's Land
- Loudness – Live-Loud-Alive: Loudness in Tokyo
- Magnum – The Eleventh Hour
- Mama's Boys – Turn It Up
- Manilla Road – Crystal Logic
- Manowar – Into Glory Ride
- Mass (Ger) - Metal Fighter
- Max Havoc – Max Havoc
- Max Lynx – Take One
- McCoy – McCoy (EP)
- Mercyful Fate – Melissa
- Metallica – Kill 'Em All
- Metal Massacre - Metal Massacre III (Compilation, various artists)
- Metal Massacre - Metal Massacre IV (Compilation, various artists)
- Mindless Sinner – Master of Evil (EP)
- Molly Hatchet – No Guts...No Glory
- Gary Moore – Dirty Fingers
- Gary Moore – Victims of the Future
- Gary Moore – Rockin' Every Night – Live in Japan
- Gary Moore – Live at the Marquee
- Mötley Crüe – Shout at the Devil
- Motörhead – Another Perfect Day
- MSG – Built to Destroy
- Night Ranger – Midnight Madness
- Nightwing – Stand Up and Be Counted
- No Bros – Our Own Way
- Aldo Nova – Subject
- Onslaught - What Lies Ahead (Demo)
- Ostrogoth – Full Moon's Eyes (EP)
- Overdrive – Metal Attack
- Oz – Fire in the Brain
- Ozzy Osbourne – Bark at the Moon
- Pandemonium – Heavy Metal Soldiers
- Pantera – Metal Magic
- Picture – Eternal Dark
- Pretty Maids – Pretty Maids (EP)
- Quartz – Against All Odds
- Queensrÿche – Queensrÿche (EP)
- Quiet Riot – Metal Health
- Rage (UK) – Run for the Night
- Rated X - Rock Blooded
- Raven – All for One
- Ratt – Ratt (EP)
- Riff Raff – Give the Dead Man Some Water
- Riot – Born in America
- Ritual – Widow
- Roadrunner - Teenage Warcry (EP)
- Rock Goddess – Rock Goddess
- Rock Goddess – Hell Hath No Fury
- The Rods – In the Raw
- The Rods – Live (live)
- Satan – Court in the Act
- Satan Jokers – Les Fils du Métal
- Savage – Loose 'N Lethal
- Savage Grace – The Dominatress (EP)
- Savatage – Sirens
- Saxon – Power & the Glory
- Shy – Once Bitten... Twice...
- Silver Mountain – Shakin' Brains
- Sinner – Fast Decision
- Six Feet Under (Swe) – Six Feet Under
- Slayer (S.A. Slayer) – Prepare to Die (EP)
- Slayer – Show No Mercy
- Sledgehammer – Blood on Their Hands
- Sortilège – Sortilège (EP)
- Sound Barrier – Total Control
- Spartan Warrior – Steel n' Chains
- Stampede – Hurricane Town
- Starfighters – In-Flight Movie
- Steeler – Steeler
- Suicidal Tendencies – Suicidal Tendencies
- Takashi – Kamikaze Killers (EP)
- Talas – Live Speed on Ice
- Tank – This Means War
- Terraplane – I Survive (EP)
- Thin Lizzy – Thunder and Lightning
- Thin Lizzy – Life - Live
- Thor – Unchained (EP)
- Thunderstick – Feel Like Rock'n'Roll? (EP)
- Tokyo Blade – Tokyo Blade
- Torch – Torch
- Bernie Tormé – Electric Gypsies
- Trance – Power Infusion
- Triumph – Never Surrender
- Twisted Sister – You Can't Stop Rock 'n' Roll
- 220 Volt – 220 Volt
- UFO – Making Contact
- Vanadium – A Race with the Devil
- Vandenberg – Heading for a Storm
- Vardis – The Lion's Share (comp)
- Vault – No More Escape
- Victim – Power Hungry
- Virgin Steele – Guardians of the Flame
- Virgin Steele – Wait for the Night (EP)
- Vixen – Made in Hawaii (EP)
- Warlord – Deliver Us (EP)
- Warriors – Warriors
- White Heat – Krakatoa
- Wild Dogs – Wild Dogs
- Wildfire – Brute Force and Ignorance
- Winterkat – Winterkat (EP)
- Witchfinder General – Friends of Hell
- Witchfynde – Cloak and Dagger
- Xcursion – Xcursion (EP)
- Y&T – Mean Streak
- Zebra – Zebra
- Zero Nine – Headline

== Events ==
- Yngwie Malmsteen starts performing in the band Steeler. Also in that band was vocalist Ron Keel (later on Keel) and former W.A.S.P. bassist Rik Fox. The band produced only one album, Steeler.
- April 11: Metallica fires lead guitarist Dave Mustaine for substance abuse issues, replacing him with Exodus guitarist Kirk Hammett; Mustaine subsequently forms the band Megadeth.
- Kiss ends the use of makeup in their act.
- November 19: the single by Quiet Riot "Cum on Feel the Noize" is No. 5 on the Billboard Hot 100.
- April 17: Mountain bassist, and Cream producer, Felix Pappalardi is shot and killed by his wife Gail Collins Pappalardi.
- Metallica and Slayer both release their debut albums Kill 'Em All and Show No Mercy.
- After his song "Runaway" becomes a surprise hit on New York radio station WAPP-FM, Jon Bon Jovi forms the band Bon Jovi.

Preceded by 1982	Heavy Metal Timeline; 1983	Succeeded by 1984
