= 1982 in heavy metal music =

This is a timeline documenting the events of heavy metal in the year 1982.

== Newly formed bands ==
- Abattoir
- Arakain
- Armored Saint
- Artillery
- Avenger
- Baby Tuckoo
- BlackLace
- Brocas Helm
- Cinderella
- Cobra
- Coney Hatch
- Corrosion of Conformity (not originally a metal band)
- Crumbsuckers
- Culprit
- Death Angel
- Destruction
- Dio
- Dirty Rotten Imbeciles
- Dr. Mastermind
- D.A.D.
- Ezo
- Fates Warning
- The Georgia Satellites
- Godflesh (under the name "Fall of Because" until 1988)
- Griva
- Guardian
- Hazzard
- Heavens Gate
- Hell
- Hellhammer
- Hellion
- Helstar
- Ice-T
- Kreator
- Lȧȧz Rockit
- Lethal
- Liege Lord
- Luzbel
- Mad Max
- Madam X
- Mournblade
- No Mercy
- Obsession
- Onslaught
- Outrage
- Philadelphia
- Post Mortem
- Roxx Gang
- Seikima-II
- Sieges Even
- Sinner
- Smack
- Streets
- Swans
- Tankard
- Terra Rosa
- TNT
- Tredegar
- Tublatanka
- Steve Vai
- Voivod
- W.A.S.P.
- Warfare
- Warlock
- Warrior
- Warriors
- Watchtower
- Waysted
- Wrath
- X (later known as X Japan)
- Znowhite

== Albums & EPs ==
- Lee Aaron - The Lee Aaron Project
- Accept - Restless and Wild
- Acid - Acid
- Aerosmith - Rock in a Hard Place
- Alice Cooper - Zipper Catches Skin
- Americade - American Metal
- Anvil - Metal on Metal
- April Wine - Power Play
- August Redmoon - Fools Are Never Alone (EP)
- Axewitch - Pray for Metal (EP)
- The B'zz – Get Up
- Barón Rojo - Volumen brutal
- Beast (Ger) - Beast
- Bengal Tigers - Metal Fetish (EP)
- Bitch - Damnation Alley (EP)
- Bitches Sin - Predator
- Blackfoot - Highway Song Live!
- Black Sabbath - Live Evil
- Blue Öyster Cult - Extraterrestrial Live
- Bodine - Bold as Brass
- Bow Wow – Asian Volcano
- Bow Wow – Warning From Stardust
- Budgie - Deliver Us from Evil
- Breaker (Can) - In Days of Heavy Metal (EP)
- Breslau - Volksmusik
- Cheap Trick - One on One
- Cintron - Cintron (EP)
- Cloven Hoof - The Opening Ritual (EP)
- Coney Hatch - Coney Hatch
- Demon - The Unexpected Guest
- Demon Flight - Demon Flight (EP)
- Diamond Head - Borrowed Time
- Dietrich - Dietrich (EP)
- E.F. Band - Deep Cut
- Fargo - F
- Fist (UK) - Back with a Vengeance
- Fortnox - Fortnox
- Frank Marino - Juggernaut
- Gamma - Gamma 3
- Gary Moore - Corridors of Power
- Gaskin - No Way Out
- Geddes Axe - Escape from New York (EP)
- Gillan - Magic
- Girl - Wasted Youth
- Girlschool - Screaming Blue Murder
- Glory Bells Band - Dressed in Black
- Grand Prix – There for None to See
- Sammy Hagar - Three Lock Box
- Hanoi Rocks - Oriental Beat
- Hanoi Rocks - Self Destruction Blues
- Headpins - Turn It Loud
- Heavy Load - Death or Glory
- Heritage - Remorse Code
- Hughes/Thrall - Hughes/Thrall
- The Hunt - The Thrill of the Kill
- Hyksos - Hyksos
- Iron Maiden - The Number of the Beast
- Judas Priest - Screaming for Vengeance
- Killer (Bel) - Wall of Sound
- Killer (Swi) - Thriller
- Kiss - Creatures of the Night
- Krokus - One Vice at a Time
- Led Zeppelin - Coda (comp)
- Legend - Death in the Nursery
- Legend - Frontline (EP)
- Loudness - Devil Soldier
- Mad Max - Mad Max
- Magnum - Chase the Dragon
- Mama's Boys - Plug It In
- Manilla Road - Metal
- Manowar - Battle Hymns
- Mass (EU) - Fighter
- Mercy – Swedish Metal (EP)
- Mercyful Fate - Nuns Have No Fun (EP)
- Messendger - Messendger
- Metal Massacre - Metal Massacre (Compilation, various artists)
- Metal Massacre - Metal Massacre II (Compilation, various artists)
- Michael Schenker Group - Assault Attack
- More - Blood & Thunder
- Motörhead - Iron Fist
- Night Ranger - Dawn Patrol
- Nightwing – Black Summer
- No Bros - Ready for the Action
- Aldo Nova - Aldo Nova
- Ted Nugent - Nugent
- Obús - Poderoso como el trueno
- Ozzy Osbourne - Speak of the Devil (live)
- Overlord (US) - Broken Toys (EP)
- Pat Benatar - Get Nervous
- Picture - Diamond Dreamer
- Plasmatics - Coup d'Etat
- Rage (UK) - Nice 'n' Dirty
- Rainbow - Straight Between the Eyes
- Rapid Tears - Honestly
- Raven - Crash Bang Wallop (EP)
- Raven - Wiped Out
- Resurrection Band - D.M.Z.
- Riff Raff - Robot Stud
- Riot - Restless Breed
- Riot - Riot Live (EP)
- The Rods - Wild Dogs
- Rose Tattoo - Scarred for Life
- Rush - Signals
- Samson - Losing My Grip (EP)
- Samson - Before the Storm
- Santers - Mayday (EP)
- Santers - Racing Time
- Saxon - The Eagle Has Landed (live)
- Scorpions - Blackout
- Sharks - Altar Ego
- Shiva - Firedance
- Sinner - Wild 'n' Evil
- Speed Queen - Speed Queen, aka II
- Split Beaver - When Hell Won't Have You
- Squadron - First Mission
- Stampede - Days of Wine and Roses (EP)
- Stampede - The Official Bootleg (live)
- Street Fighter - Feel the Noise
- Stress - Stress
- Sweet - Identity Crisis
- Talas - Sink Your Teeth Into That
- Tank - Filth Hounds of Hades
- Tank - Power of the Hunter
- Teeze (CA) - Teeze (EP)
- 38 Special - Special Forces
- TNT - TNT
- Torch - Fire Raiser (EP)
- Bernie Tormé – Turn Out the Lights
- Trance - Break Out
- Trust - Savage
- Twisted Sister - Ruff Cuts (EP)
- Twisted Sister - Under the Blade
- Tygers of Pan Tang - The Cage
- Tytan - Blind Men and Fools (EP)
- UFO - Mechanix
- Uriah Heep - Abominog
- Vanadium - Metal Rock
- Vandenberg - Vandenberg
- Van Halen - Diver Down
- Vardis - Quo Vardis
- Vendetta (US) - Vendetta
- Venom - Black Metal
- Virgin Steele - Virgin Steele
- Viva – Dealers of the Night
- Voie De Fait - Ange ou Démon
- Voltz - Knight's Fall
- Warning - Warning II
- White Heat – White Heat
- Whitesnake - Saints & Sinners
- Witchfinder General – Soviet Invasion (EP)
- Witchfinder General - Death Penalty
- Y&T - Black Tiger
- Zero Nine – Blank Verse
- Zero Nine – Visions, Scenes and Dreams

== Disbandments ==
- Rok Mašina

== Events ==
- Uriah Heep re-forms with Mick Box as bandleader.
- Iron Maiden's first album with Bruce Dickinson, The Number of the Beast, reaches No.1 in the U.K. music charts.
- Motörhead's guitarist "Fast" Eddie Clarke leaves the band and is replaced by ex-Thin Lizzy guitarist Brian Robertson.
- Judas Priest's single "You've Got Another Thing Comin'" is released. It will go on to become the band's best selling single.
- Ozzy Osbourne's guitarist Randy Rhoads dies in an airplane accident on March 19.
- Iron Maiden's drummer Clive Burr is fired from the band because of personal and tour-schedule problems. Nicko McBrain from Trust is hired to replace him.
- Ace Frehley, Space Ace and lead guitarist of Kiss, leaves the band. Vinnie Vincent takes his place.
- Queen departs from their hard rock legacy with the ill-received funk/disco album Hot Space.
- December: Former Deep Purple vocalist Ian Gillan replaces Ronnie James Dio in Black Sabbath.
- The band Metallica leaves Los Angeles and relocates to the San Francisco Bay Area.

Preceded by 1981	Heavy Metal Timeline; 1982	Succeeded by 1983
