= Bang Your Head!!! =

Heavy metal and hard rock festival held in Germany

Coordinates: 48°15′17″N 8°50′42″E

- Genre: Heavy metal, hard rock
- Dates: June/July
- Locations: Balingen, Germany
- Years active: 1996–2022

Bang Your Head!!! was a heavy metal and hard rock festival held annually in Germany.

First held in 1996 as a one-day indoor event in the Stefan-Hartmann-Halle in Tübingen with a crowd of 600 people, Bang Your Head!!! has since moved to Balingen, growing into a multi-day event attracting 1,800 people in 1998, 18,000 people in 1999 and 20,000 in 2005. Acts that have performed at this festival include W.A.S.P., Dio, Motörhead, Deep Purple, and Twisted Sister.

The festival was discontinued in 2023.

== Lineups ==
=== 2014 ===
Held on 11 and 12 July at Messegelände in Balingen, Germany.

- Twisted Sister
- Europe
- Axel Rudi Pell & Friends
- Anthrax
- Sebastian Bach
- Unisonic
- Michael Schenker's Temple of Rock
- Stryper
- Obituary
- Exodus
- Rob Rock
- Ektomorf
- Kissin' Dynamite
- Grave
- Schirenc Plays Pungent Stench
- Riot V
- Delain
- Omen
- Warlord
- Mad Max
- Atlantean Kodex
- Hirax
- Evocation
- The Exalted Piledriver
- More
- Accu§er
- Vain
- Warrant

Warm-up show on 10 July:

- Grave Digger
- Victory
- Storm Warrior
- Bullet
- Dynamite

=== 2009 ===
Held on 26 and 27 June at Messegelände in Balingen, Germany.

- Blind Guardian
- Journey
- W.A.S.P.
- U.D.O.
- Y&T
- Lita Ford
- Exodus
- Sodom
- Hardcore Superstar
- Sacred Reich
- Warrior
- Primordial
- Pink Cream 69
- Voi Vod
- Driver
- Ross the Boss
- Powerwolf
- Kissin' Dynamite
- Lȧȧz Rockit
- Alestorm
- Cloven Hoof
- Hatstik

=== 2008 ===
Held on 27 and 28 June at Messegelände in Balingen, Germany.

- Judas Priest
- Queensrÿche
- Saxon
- Tramp's White Lion
- Hardcore Superstar
- Great White
- Yngwie Malmsteen's Rising Force
- Obituary
- Rage
- Grave Digger
- Agent Steel
- Tankard
- Onslaught
- Ensiferum
- Korpiklaani
- Lizzy Borden
- Breaker
- Týr
- Age of Evil
- Contracrash
- Secrecy
- Forbidden

=== 2007 ===
Held on 22 and 23 June at Messegelände in Balingen, Germany.

- Heaven and Hell
- Edguy
- HammerFall
- Amon Amarth
- Amorphis
- Archer Nation
- Brainstorm
- Dark Tranquillity
- Evergrey
- Finntroll
- Girlschool
- Mercenary
- Mystic Prophecy
- Nazareth
- Powermad
- Praying Mantis
- Steelheart
- Thunder
- Vicious Rumors
- Violent Storm
- W.A.S.P.
- Wolf

=== 2006 ===
- Whitesnake
- In Flames
- Foreigner
- Stratovarius
- Helloween
- Y&T
- Quiet Riot
- Rik Emmett
- Jon Oliva's Pain
- Unleashed
- Death Angel
- Exodus
- Armored Saint
- Flotsam and Jetsam
- Vengeance
- L.A. Guns
- Leatherwolf
- Victory
- Count Raven
- Powerwolf
- Hellfueled

=== 2005 ===
- Twisted Sister
- Motörhead
- Dio
- Saxon
- Doro
- U.D.O.
- Sebastian Bach
- Gamma Ray
- Nevermore
- Krokus
- Axel Rudi Pell
- Destruction
- Virgin Steele
- Amon Amarth
- Tankard
- Candlemass
- Jag Panzer
- Morgana Lefay
- Exciter
- Nasty Savage
- Vicious Rumors
- Demon

+ 'Very special guests':

- Mike Tramp's White Lion
- Hanoi Rocks

=== 2004 ===
- Iced Earth
- Alice Cooper
- Queensrÿche
- Sebastian Bach
- Gotthard
- Testament
- Children of Bodom
- UFO
- Anthrax
- Magnum
- Primal Fear
- Death Angel
- Blaze
- Lillian Axe
- Kingdom Come
- Omen
- Doomsword
- Shok Paris
- Angel
- Ruffians
- Ballistic
- Cage
- Majesty

=== 2003 ===
- Twisted Sister
- Dio
- Thin Lizzy
- HammerFall
- U.D.O.
- Sodom
- Overkill
- Hypocrisy
- Y & T
- Dokken
- TNT
- Annihilator
- Masterplan
- Amon Amarth
- Brainstorm
- Axxis
- Pink Cream 69
- Rob Rock
- Bitch
- Angel Witch
- Destructor
- Hirax

Warm-up show

- Doomsword
- Omen

=== 2002 ===
- Slayer
- Saxon
- Halford
- Nightwish
- Doro
- Fozzy
- Gamma Ray
- Nevermore
- Rawhead Rexx
- Iron Savior
- Candlemass
- Titan Force
- Bonfire
- Shakra
- Jag Panzer
- Vanden Plas
- Rhapsody
- Tankard
- Rival
- Mägo de Oz
- S.A. Adams

Warm-up gig:

- Titan Force
- Wizard
- Powergod

Aftershow:

- Shadowkeep
- Falconer
