= Santa (band) =

Spanish rock band

- Also known as: Viuda Negra
- Origin: Madrid, Spain
- Genres: Heavy metal, hard rock, AOR
- Years active: 1983-1987
- Labels: Chapa, Zafiro

Santa was a Spanish heavy metal / hard rock band founded in 1983 in Madrid.

== Career ==
The group started when Fernando Sánchez and Juan Luis Serrano, (both of Obús), approached singer Azuzena Dorado after they saw a gig of her band, Huracán, in 1983. They then called guitarist Jero Ramiro (from Ñu) and recorded a demo for Chapa Discos in 1983 (as "Viuda Negra"). Right before recording their first album they decided to change their name to Santa, as Fernando Sánchez and Juan Luis Serrano left the band and were replaced by Bernardo Ballester and Julio Díaz.

This line-up recorded Reencarnación, their first album released in 1984

After the second LP No hay piedad para los condenados was released, in 1985, vocalist Azuzena Dorado left the band. Argentine singer Leonor Marchesi (from the band Púrpura) joined Santa to record an album, entitled Templario, featuring a more melodic/AOR sound which sold quite poorly.

After a show in 1987 the band decided to break up.

== Discography ==
- Reencarnación (1984)
- No hay piedad para los condenados (1985)
- Templario (1986)
