= Paganini (band) =

Swiss hard rock band

- Origin: Switzerland
- Genre: Hard rock
- Labels: Vertigo, Grüezi, Tyrolis, Pazouzou, Yesterrock
- Past members: Marc Paganini - vocals Ralph Murthy - guitar Edgar Zanoni - guitar Iso (Gemsch) - bass Peter Beglinger, aka P.B. Bega - drums Enzo Buttà - bass Angi Schiliro - guitar Vito Cecere - drums Tino Tedesco - bass Diego Rapacchietti - drums Dale Powers - guitar Kiki Crétin - bass

Paganini was a hard rock band from Switzerland founded by vocalist Marc Paganini and guitarist Ralph Murthy. Marc Paganini had previously been associated with the band Viva before forming Paganini.

The band signed with Vertigo Records and in 1985 released its debut album, Weapon of Love. Metal Hammer described the album unfavorably in its contemporary review. The video/single, "Berlin by Night", was part of the soundtrack for the German movie Alpha City.

In 1987, Metal Hammer covered Paganini in connection with It’s A Long Way to the Top, noting that the album followed Weapon of Love and that recording took place at Karo Studios in Münster.

Paganini recorded five studio albums between 1985 and 2008. Following the release of Weapon of Love in 1985, Paganini appeared as a support act for Mötley Crüe on dates of the European leg of the band's 1986 Theatre of Pain tour, including concerts in Sweden, Norway and France.

The 1987 follow-up album, It's A Long Way to the Top, charted at number six on the Swiss album charts. Subsequent albums were released on smaller labels with different line-ups centered around Marc Paganini.

Weapon of Love and It’s A Long Way to the Top were both re-mastered and re-issued by German label Yesterrock in 2009.

Murthy died on September 15, 2013, due to liver failure. Marc Paganini died on January 11, 2019, from unknown causes.

== Discography ==
=== Studio albums ===
Title	Album details	Peak chart positions
Title	Album details	SWI
Weapon of Love	Released: 1985; Label: Vertigo	—
It's a Long Way to the Top	Released: 1987; Label: Vertigo	6
Detox	Released: 1990; Label: Grüezi	30
Esoterrorism	Released: 2003; Label: Tyrolis Music	—
Resurrection (compilation)	Released: 2005; Label: Pazouzou Records	—
Medicine Man	Released: 2008; Label: Pazouzou Records	—
