= Black Rose (British band) =

British heavy metal band

- Also known as: Ice (1976–1980)
- Origin: Teesside, England
- Genres: Heavy metal, hard rock
- Years active: 1976–1989, 2006–present
- Labels: Neat, Bullet, Majestic Rock, Hellion, High Roller, Metalizer, Pure Steel
- Members: Steve Bardsley; Kenny Nicholson; Kiko Rivers; Paul Fowler; Ash Robertson

Black Rose are an English heavy metal band from Teesside in the north east of England. They formed in 1976 under the name Ice but changed it to Black Rose in 1980. Black Rose was one of the many British bands considered part of the new wave of British heavy metal movement. The original line-up was Steve Bardsley (lead vocals/guitar), Kenny Nicholson (guitar), Marty Rajn (bass) and Mark Eason (drums). Over the next nine years the band went through various line-up changes and released quite a few records including two albums: Boys Will Be Boys (1984) and Walk It How You Talk It (1986) before splitting up in 1989. The band then re-formed in 2006 and released their third album Cure for Your Disease in 2010. In 2022 they released their fourth studio album WTF on Pure Steel Records.

== History ==
Black Rose started out as Ice back in 1976 when three friends from a School in Saltburn by the Sea decided to form a rock band. The three guys were Steve Bardsley, Marty Rajn and Mark Eason who soon became a four piece after they saw guitarist Kenny Nicholson playing in a local pub and asked him if he wanted to join up with them. Eason left the band citing musical differences and local drummer Charlie Mack was drafted in. As this line-up they recorded their first demo tape at Impulse Studios in Wallsend Newcastle, the home of independent record label Neat Records, which consisted of five songs: "Alright On The Night", "Biker", "Killer", "Loveshock" and "Raising Hell". The demo was picked up by various rock disco playlists, and featured in the local charts section of the British rock magazine Kerrang!.

Nicholson and Mack both left the band to pursue others ventures, Mack joined Emerson and then ended up in Samson and Nicholson went on to form both Holland and Fast Kutz. New guitarist Chris "wahwah" Watson and drummer Mal Smith then joined the band and they released their first single on the Teesbeat label called "No Point Runnin'". Rajn fell out with the rest of the band over various issues and departed, making way for another bass player Mick Thompson to step in. This went on to be probably the most stable line-up of the band, recording and releasing an array of songs including their début album Boys Will Be Boys and featuring on a variety of compilation records. The band toured all over the UK and Europe playing alongside established bands including Raven, Terraplane, Budgie, Trust, Vardis, Atomic Rooster, Pretty Maids and Spider, and gathered a worldwide fanbase having fan clubs in Europe, Japan and the United States.

By the mid 1980s, they were also joined by guitar and keyboard player Gary Todd and major record labels Atlantic Records and Bronze Records both showed some interest in the band but neither signed them. Consequently, Watson was disillusioned and left making way for the guitarist Pat O'Neil. This line-up recorded the band's second album Walk It How You Talk It released by Neat Records which saw them recording more melodic songs. This album was picked up by AJK, a subsidiary of K-tel in the United States where it was repackaged for release, but due to a dispute over copyrights with a US band of the same name the record was not issued. This was to be the beginning of the end for the band and although they recorded some more material nothing was released and they split up in 1989.

In 2006 Bardsley, after speaking to Watson, decided to write some new material together and Black Rose were born again. British indie rock label Majestic Rock Records released a CD of the band's songs from 1980–89 called Bright Lights Burnin' and, in 2010, the band released their third album Cure for Your Disease as an independent download-only release.

A new line-up was put together and the band played their first gig in 25 years at the Cradle Will Rock festival in Shildon, County Durham. In 2012, they were invited to play at Hammerfest lV and also at the Headbangers Open Air festival in Germany. The band also released three new albums on German record labels.

The band have recently announced a two album deal with Pure Steel Records.

== Discography ==
=== Studio albums ===
- Boys Will Be Boys (Bullet Records 1984)
- Walk It How You Talk It (Neat Records 1986)
- Cure for Your Disease (Metalizer Records 2012)
- WTF (Pure Steel Records 2022)

=== EPs ===
- Black Rose EP (Bullet Records 1984)
- Nightmare EP (Neat Records 1985)

=== Compilations ===
- Bright Lights Burnin' (Majestic Rock Records 2006)
- The Early Years Remastered and More (Hellion Records 2012)
- Loveshock (High Roller Records 2012)

=== Singles ===
- "No Point Runnin'" / "Sucker for Your Love" (Teesbeat 1982)
- "Boys Will Be Boys" / "Liar" (Bullet Records 1984)
- "Pain" ( digital single Pure Steel Records 2022)

=== Featured on ===
- One Take No Dubs split EP (Neat Records 1982)
- Roxcalibur (Guardian Records 1982)
- Heavy Metal Collection vol 2 (Elap music Denmark 1993)
- Heavy Metal Collection vol 3 ( Elap music Denmark 1993)
- Heavy Metal Collection vol 4 ( Elap music Denmark 1993)
- Metal Masters (Castle Records 1994)
- The Flame Burns On (Neat Records 2002)
- The Singles Collection Volumes 2 and 3 (Neat Records 2002)
- Total Metal Attack (Old School Records 2004)
- NWOBHM Thunder (Cherry Red Records 2020)

== Band members ==
Current

- Steve Bardsley – Vocals, guitar (1976–1989, 2006–present)
- Kenny Nicholson – guitar (1976–1982, 2011–present)
- Kiko Rivers – bass (2006–present)
- Paul Fowler – drums (1987–1989, 2016–present)

Former

- Marty Rajn – bass (1976–1982)
- Mark Eason – drums (1976–1982)
- Charlie Mack – drums (1982)
- Chris Watson – guitar (1982–1986, 2006–2011)
- Mal Smith – drums (1982–1986)
- Mick Thompson – bass (1982–1989)
- Gary Todd – guitar, keyboards (1985–1989)
- Pat O'Neil – guitar (1986–1989)
- Barry Youll – drums (1986–1987, 2006–2010)
- Davey Patterson – guitar (1989)
- Chris Bennet – drums (2010–2016)
- Kiko Rivers – bass (2006–2023)
- Ash Robertson - Lead Vocals Live (2022-2023)

== See also ==
- List of new wave of British heavy metal bands
