= Fantom Warior =

American thrash metal band

- Origin: Union, New Jersey, United States
- Genres: Thrash metal; speed metal; heavy metal
- Years active: 1984–1989, 2012–present
- Label: Token
- Members: Keith Pires; John Chernack; James Jensen
- Past members: Steve "Schley" Schlehuber; CJ Scioscia
- Website: http://www.fantomwarior.info

Fantom Warior is an American thrash metal band that was founded in 1984 in Union, New Jersey. consisting of John Chernack (bass guitar and vocals), Keith Pires (guitar and vocals), James Jensen (drums) and Steve Schley (guitar). The band's major influences were Slayer, Metallica and Anthrax. Fantom Warior had a self-distributed demo and album as well as appearing on a compilation album. Fantom Warior's musical style was said to be hardcore thrash similar to Slayer and Kreator with changes throughout their songs that mix speedcore and very heavy thrash. Their music contained a blend of speed and technical development unknown to some of the other bands of their time.

== History ==
Fantom Warior started as a heavy metal cover band under the name Phantom Lord in 1984 in Union, New Jersey. The original lineup featured guitarist Keith Pires, drummer James Jensen, bass guitarist John Chernack, guitarist Steve Schley and vocalist Dave Montini. The band had a number of lead vocalists, most notably Jason Glicken (alias Raeph Glicken) who continued his music career as a drummer for a number of hardcore punk bands such as S.F.A., Kill Your Idols and The Arsons, as well as the black metal band Black Anvil. In early 1985, the lineup of John Chernack, Keith Pires, James Jensen, and Steve Schley, with Chernack and Pires taking on vocal frontmen duties, changed the band name to Fantom Warior due to the emergence of another New York band using the name Phantom Lord. The group's first live performance as Fantom Warior was at the Show Place in Dover, New Jersey, in May 1985.

In March 1986, Fantom Warior released a five-track demo tape containing original material entitled Morbid Invasion. It was distributed worldwide and was well received by a metal magazines in both the US and in Europe. Critic Esben Slot Sorensen of the Danish metal magazine Blackthorn wrote "This is a killer demo! Fantom Warior will be a very possible subject for the 'demo of the year 1986' poll ... you must take a look on the cover just to assure you that it is not Tom Araya who's singing". Critic Mike Exley for the UK metal magazine Metal Forces wrote "Morbid Invasion is both a classic and a must for true metal fans and bands to listen to ... Morbid Invasion leads off with a solid riff, but it's the middle section of this song that has me foaming at the mouth". Writer Andrew Sakowicz from the Chapel magazine felt that with bands like Fantom Warior, "the East Coast is finally a scene to be reckoned with".

In April 1987, Fantom Warior was one of nine artists of varying musical genres to appear on a compilation album distributed by Merlin Recording Studios. The record album entitled Merlin Music Presents . . . featured a track from Fantom Warior entitled "E.R.C." (Eat the Rotting Corpse) which did not appear on their Morbid Invasion demo.

In October 1987, Fantom Warior released a ten-track record album entitled Fantasy or Reality, distributed under the band's independent label Token Records. This album, like the Morbid Invasion demo, was also distributed and sold directly by the band via mail order and local music stores throughout New Jersey and New York.

Predating the popularity of the Internet and the World Wide Web in the early 1990s, Fantom Warior, like many other 1980s metal bands, established a worldwide fan base with the help of reviews and articles that appeared in the metal magazines and the underground metal fanzine networks. The publishing of Fantom Warior's contact information in these articles, initially in the UK Magazine, Metal Forces, and then the Dutch magazine, Blackthorne, as well as many other regional fanzines, helped jump start Fantom Warior's worldwide distribution of the Morbid Invasion demo, the Fantasy or Reality album, and other merchandise. Although the Fantom Warior name and music spread worldwide, Fantom Warior played primarily in venues in New Jersey and New York. Fantom Warior was known to co-headline performances with another Union, New Jersey, metal band, Insaniac.

The lack of professional management and touring that would have come with a contract with a major label as well as the downturn of thrash metal during the late 1980s made it difficult for unsigned bands, such as Fantom Warior, to thrive. The group eventually disbanded in 1989.

Fantom Warior reunited in 2012 and has begun working on a new album scheduled to be released late 2015. Fantom Warior has played multiple shows since reuniting including venues with Raven, Black Anvil, Exhumer, Bloodfeast, Malevolent Creation, Prime Evil, Antichrist, Impaler, Deceased, Obliteration just to name a few. Fantom Warior performed as Direct Support on June 10, 2014, for Grim Reaper at St Vitus in Brooklyn NY to kick-off their North America Tour. Fantom Warior provided support for former part-time member Raeph Glicken's band Black Anvil at their record release party on July 20, 2014, at St Vitus in Brooklyn. Fantom Warior recently headlined their last show on 8/29 at St Vitus with 4 other bands on the bill. At the end of 2014, Fantom Warior released THE ARCHIVE CD which contains all of their music on one CD remastered. On March 17, Fantom Warior released a Limited Edition Vinyl of the Classic Demo Morbid Invasion through Electric Assault Records.

== Discography ==
- Morbid Invasion (demo, 1986)
- Merlin Music Presents... (studio compilation, 1986)
- Fantasy or Reality (full-length, 1987)
- "Retribution" (single, 2012 available, It Wont Die Media)
- The Archive (Morbid Invasion demo, Fantasy or Reality LP, and bonus tracks, available on CD)
- "Morbid Invasion" (vinyl, 2015)
- Upcoming release of all new material (Fall of 2015)
