= Killer (Belgian band) =

Belgian heavy metal band

- Origin: Antwerpen, Belgium
- Genres: Heavy metal, power metal, hard rock, speed metal
- Years active: 1980–1993; 2000 - present
- Label: Steamhammer

Killer is a Belgian heavy metal band founded in 1980. Initially, they played hard rock, but later transitioned to traditional heavy metal, speed metal and power metal.

== History ==
Killer was founded in 1980 by Paul "Shorty" Van Camp (lead guitar and lead vocals) and "Fat Leo" (drums), who had just split up their previous band, Mothers of Track. After a few auditions, "Spooky" (bass guitar and lead vocals) joined the band. After four months, their first record, Ready for Hell, was recorded and released by WEA (Warner Music Group). Killer was managed and advised by Alfie Falckenbach, Leo Felsenstein and Stonne Holmgren. Alfie Falckenbach founded Mausoleum, one of the first independent heavy metal labels. Killer was the first Belgian metal band inspired by the success of the NWOBHM bands such as Saxon, Iron Maiden, and Def Leppard.

Due to the trio formula, the rough voices, speedy uptempos, and double bass drums, Killer was always compared with Motorhead.

At the end of 1981, "Fat Leo" was replaced by "Double Bear".

In early 1982, a second album, Wall of Sound, was released on the Lark label, marking the international breakthrough of the band. Killer toured extensively and performed at several festivals in Europe.

Other Belgian bands came into the scene after Alfie decided to start up his own record company, Mausoleum. One of the first releases of this label was Killers' third album Shockwaves. They received excellent reviews in Europe, US, Brazil and Japan. Mausoleum then launched new Belgian bands such as Ostrogoth, Crossfire, Acid, FN Guns, Bad Lizard and Lions Pride.

In 1985, Killer recorded a double live album containing their best songs and a few new compositions. The album was recorded with Dieter Dierks' (Scorpions) mobile studio in a sold-out venue in Antwerp. During the last song, more than 100 fans climbed on stage to sing along with the band. Set to be titled Still alive in eighty-five, the album was never released due to problems at Mausoleum. The artwork was finished, and the tapes were mixed but kept in the studio owner's safe due to legal difficulties with Mausoleum. After the label ended, Killer never succeeded to recover the finished tapes from the studio.

Killer toured Poland in 1986, a crossing of the Iron Curtain which was uncommon. Sold out venues (around 10,000 people every night) and an enthusiastic crowd kept the band alive for a few more months, but band members and crew were still very disappointed and discouraged because of the non-release of the live album. This caused the first split of the band in early 1987.

In 1988, Shorty released a solo album, Too Wild to Tame, under the name "Van Camp" at CNR records.

In 1989, Spooky and Shorty decided to start Killer again, with new drummer Rudy Simmons and second guitar player Jan Van Springel.

A fourth album, Fatal Attraction, was recorded in Germany and released in 1990 by the re-formed Mausoleum label. It was initially only released in Germany, where the band mainly toured and operated, but was released elsewhere later.

Killer split for the second time in 1991.

Shorty and Spooky performed in a power blues band, Blues-Express from 1991 until 1993, splitting due to musical differences. During this time, Killer did three reunion gigs with their new drummer, Vanne.

Shorty started a new classic rock-metal cover band, Blackjack, in 1995.

== Discography ==
- 1981: Ready for Hell
- 1982: Wall of Sound
- 1984: Shock Waves
- 1990: Fatal Attraction
- 2003: Broken Silence
- 2005: Immortal
- 2015: Monsters Of Rock
- 2023: Hellfire
