= Sacred Oath =

American heavy metal band

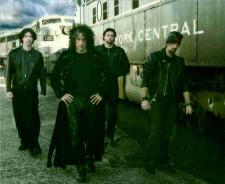
- Sacred Oath promo pic

Background information
- Origin: Bethel, Connecticut, United States
- Genres: Heavy metal; power metal; thrash metal; speed metal
- Years active: 1985–1988; 2005–present
- Label: Angel Thorne Music
- Members: Rob Thorne; Kenny Evans; Scott Waite; Damiano Christian
- Past members: Glen Cruciani; Pete Altieri; Lou Liotta; Bill Smith; Brendan Kelleher
- Website: www.sacredoath.net

Sacred Oath is an American heavy metal band from Bethel, Connecticut, United States. They were founded in 1984, during the American power metal movement, although they relied on thrash metal.

== History ==
Sacred Oath was formed in 1985 by Rob Thorne and Pete Altieri while they attended Bethel High School. The band recorded their first demo in 1985, and sold hundreds of copies through local stores like Record Broker and Phoenix Records, developing a following called the "Oathbangers."

They signed with Mercenary Records in 1986, shortly after recording their second demo, Shadow Out Of Time. By then, the band was known internationally in the underground circuit. Members Rob Thorne, Pete Altieri, Glen Cruciani, and Kenny Evans recorded Sacred Oath's debut album, A Crystal Vision, in May 1987, at Presence Studios in East Haven, Connecticut, with producer Dave Obrizzo and engineer Jon Russell. The album was released in January 1988 on vinyl, cassette, and CD, and reached cult-classic status as an American power metal pioneer effort.

Sacred Oath disbanded in December 1988, due to artistic differences and frustration with their record label. Mercenary Records and parent label Celluloid Records went bankrupt soon after.

Sentinel Steel Records reissued the debut album in 2001 through an exclusive agreement with the band. The band reformed and re-recorded the album as A Crystal Revision in 2005. Thorne and Evans continued to record as Sacred Oath, issuing the acclaimed album Darkness Visible in 2007 with all four original members.

In 2008, they released the live album 'Till Death Do Us Part, recorded during their tour of Europe. This album featured new guitarist Billy Smith and new bass player Scott Waite, and established the band as active in the music industry. 'Till Death Do Us Part was chosen by iTunes as one of the ten best live metal albums that year.

In 2009, the new lineup recorded their self-titled album, Sacred Oath, featuring their first single, "Counting Zeros". The single premiered as the "Discovery Download Pick of the Week" on iTunes.

The music video was featured on MTV2's Headbangers Ball along with an interview. After recording the album, Waite left before playing any shows. Brendan Kelleher joined for the tour and remained the band's bass player.

On October 5, 2010, Sacred Oath released their fifth studio album, World On Fire. The album was produced by singer/guitarist Rob Thorne at his studio.

In 2013, the band released the reunion album Fallen, featuring the four original members. The album included songs written decades earlier (Death Knell, Lurking Fear, Dream Death) and new songs. The band did not tour following this release.

Following Fallen, Angel Thorne Music signed a worldwide distribution deal with Caroline/UMG through SRGILS, and arranged for Sacred Oath to record and release three more studio albums and a second live album. The band released Ravensong (2015), Twelve Bells (2017), and Thunder Underground - Live from NYC (2019). All three were produced by Thorne at his studio in Connecticut, and mastered by Alan Douches at West West Side Music in New York. At the start of this deal, the band released the double vinyl best-of compilation Spells and Incantations - the Best of Sacred Oath.

Following their "Twelve Bells at Midnight" tour, Sacred Oath added Damiano Christian as keyboardist, guitarist, and background vocalist during the tour, and subsequently joined as a recording member for their latest album, Return Of The Dragon, released in April 2021.

== Discography ==
- 1988: A Crystal Vision
- 2005: A Crystal Revision
- 2007: Darkness Visible
- 2008: ...'Till Death Do Us Part
- 2009: Sacred Oath
- 2010: World on Fire
- 2013: Fallen
- 2015: Ravensong
- 2017: Twelve Bells
- 2021: Return of the Dragon

== Band members ==
- Rob Thorne – lead vocals/guitar (1985–present)
- Kenny Evans – drums (1986–present)
- Scott Waite – bass (2009–present)
- Damiano Christian - guitar (2017–present)
