= Goatlord (band) =

American extreme metal band

- Origin: Las Vegas, Nevada, United States
- Genres: Doom metal, black metal, death metal
- Years active: 1985—1997
- Labels: Turbo Music, JL American, Nuclear War Now Productions
- Past members: Ace Still; Joe Frankulin; Jeff Nardone; Jeff Schwob

Goatlord was an American extreme metal band from Las Vegas, Nevada.

== Biography ==
Goatlord began in 1985. They released their first demo in June 1987, a mix of doom metal and death metal titled 1987 Demo. A cult following grew. Tape-traders renamed this first demo Forever Black Dwell in Hell, a line from the song "Unholy Black Slut". Their second demo, Sodomize the Goat, expanded Goatlord's sound. Goatlord slowed down their sound and recorded one more demo in 1991 before tensions grew regarding the band's progression. Most members wanted a slower, droning approach. The debate continued until vocalist Ace Stills left to form Doom Snake Cult.

Goatlord signed with Turbo Records. The remaining members began to work on their first full-length. They hired Mitch Harris of Napalm Death as their replacement vocalist. Harris sang on the album and only a few last-minute adjustments were needed before mastering. At this time, Stills asked to rejoin. They briefly reunited. Stills laid down his vocal tracks over Harris's, which were lost. Harris's vocals did not appear on that album, but his back-up vocals made it on the Reflections of the Solstice album.

In 2007, Nuclear War Now Productions released The Last Sodomy of Mary. This album contains nine unreleased songs recorded after Reflections of the Solstice. The limited LP version comes with a second vinyl with seven additional tracks of unreleased, live, and cover material.

Tensions between band members led to Goatlord's dissolution in 1997. Jeff Nardone joined death metal band Spun in Darkness, formed in 2006. Jeff Schwob has recorded as Schwob since 2011. Former guitarist Joe Frankulin managed Bloodshows.com until he committing a murder-suicide involving his neighbor and her eight-year-old son in 2015.

== Discography ==
=== Demos ===
- 1987: Demo '87
- 1988: Sodomize the Goat
- 1991: Promo '91

=== Albums (Studio) ===
- 1991: Reflections of the Solstice
- 1992: Goatlord

=== Albums (Compilations) ===
- 2003: Distorted Birth: The Demos
- 2007: The Last Sodomy of Mary
- 2015: Demo '87 / Reh '88

=== Albums (Split) ===
- 2004: Foreshadow / Reaper Of Man (Split with Nunslaughter)
- 2019: Gravewürm / Nunslaughter / Goatlord / Funeral Nation

== Members ==
=== Final lineup ===
- Joe Frankulin - guitars (1985–1997; died 2015)
- Jeff Nardone - drums (1985–1997)
- Jeff Schwob - bass, vocals (1986–1997)
- Chris Gans - vocals (1991–1997)

=== Earlier members ===
- Ace Still - vocals (1985–1991, 1991; died 2017)
- Hal Floyd - bass (1985-1986)
- Mitch Harris - vocals (1991)

Timeline
