= Rail (band) =

American rock band

- Origin: Bellevue, Washington, U.S.
- Genres: Hard rock, heavy metal
- Years active: 1970-present
- Labels: Dynasty Records; EMI America Records
- Members: Terry James Young; Andy Baldwin; Rick Knotts; Kelly Nobles
- Past members: Chris Kinkade; Randy Miller; Ronnie Montrose; Mark Welling Bryce Bishop
- Website: www.railonline.net

Rail is an American rock band that achieved national fame after winning the grand prize of MTV's Basement Tapes competition in 1983. Before starting their recording career, the group was well known in the Seattle area under the names "Rail & Company" and "Rail & Co."

== History ==
The band was formed by drummer Kelly Nobles, bassist/singer Terry James Young and guitarist Andy Baldwin at Highland Junior High School in Bellevue, Washington in 1970. Interlake High School mate Rick Knotts joined the band in 1973.

Rail won a best local band award from Seattle rock station KZOK-FM in 1978. The band entered the Billboard 200 albums chart with its self-titled EMI America Records release "Rail". The band toured with Van Halen, Heart, Ted Nugent, Blue Öyster Cult, Three Dog Night, The Beach Boys, Nazareth, and others.

Rail released three albums and one EP between 1980–1997 and remains a long-touring staple of the Washington local music scene. Although not officially recognized on any of their albums, during the early to mid-80s several well known local artists appeared as guest performers live and in the studio. In 1985 they were joined by guitarist Ronnie Montrose for several months. He was looking for a new band, and Rick Knotts had recently left. Billed as "Rail featuring Ronnie Montrose" or "Ronnie & Rail", they played a set of half Rail favorites and half Montrose songs ("Rock Candy", "Rock the Nation", "Matriarch", and Gamma's remake of Thunderclap Newman's "Something in the Air"). At the end of the tour, there was an amicable split.

The original four members continue to perform and record together.

== Discography ==
=== Studio albums ===
Title	Album details	Chart
Title	Album details	US
Arrival	Released: 1980; Label: Dynasty Records	—
Rail	Released: 1984; Label: EMI America	143
Rail Three	Released: 1985; Label: Dynasty Records	—
Big World	Released: 1997; Label: Art Records	—
"-" denotes a recording that did not chart or was not released in that territory.
