= Vulcain (band) =

French hard rock and heavy metal band

Vulcain is a French hard rock and heavy metal band formed in 1981.

== Comeback ==
At the end of 2009, the band expressed hopes of reviving, through an announcement on its Myspace page. The trio also announced a grand tour in 2010. It also opened for Motörhead for a number of shows in 2010. On 22 April 2013, Vulcain released a new album, V8, their first in 15 years since Stoppe La Machine.

== Discography ==
- 1984: Rock 'n' Roll Secours
- 1985: La dame de fer (EP)
- 1985: Desperados
- 1986: Big Brothers
- 1987: Live Force
- 1989: Transition
- 1992: Big Bang
- 1994: Vulcain
- 1998: Stoppe La Machine
- 2013: V8
- 2014: rock n roll secours 2014
- 2018: vinyle

Live and compilations

- 1996: Atomic Live (live)
- 1997: Compilaction (compilation)
- 2011: En revenant (live recorded in November 2010 plus bonus DVD of Hellfest 2010 concert)
