= Piledriver (band) =

Canadian heavy metal band

- Also known as: The Exalted Piledriver
- Origin: Toronto, Ontario, Canada
- Genres: Speed metal, thrash metal, heavy metal
- Years active: 1984–1989, 2004–2019
- Labels: Cobra, Full Moon Productions, High Vaultage, HME, Maximum Metal, Northern Storm, Satanic Metal

Piledriver is a Canadian thrash/speed metal band, formed in 1984 by a husband and wife duo who set out to record the heaviest album they could create. They enlisted Gord Kirchin as vocalist. They are known for an over-the-top image and flamboyant song titles and lyrics (as exemplified by such tracks as "Sex with Satan", "Alien Rape", "Sodomize the Dead", "Witch Hunt", and "Human Sacrifice"). Their best known song is possibly the title track of their debut album, Metal Inquisition from 1984. The album was followed by Stay Ugly two years later in 1986. The second album had no involvement from the original songwriting team and instead featured Kirchin fronting an already formed band for the recording sessions. These two early recordings have globally sold nearly 500,000 copies to date.

The band soon disappeared. However, some years later, Kirchin revealed that the band and albums were just a studio project and that the band never really existed at all, with all the names and virtually everything else about the band being made up. Kirchin later formed his own band, Dogs with Jobs, sporadically working on solo material.

In 2004 a new band was formed under the revised name of The Exalted Piledriver. The original lineup was Steven Lederman (stage name Tupac Sade, drums), Rob Tollefson (stage name Lobo Elf Snort, bass) with Troy Ellis and Johnny Butts on guitars. This lineup recorded Metal Manifesto Demos, a handout CD to try and garner a record deal. Two of the songs also featured Andrew Kaemmer on bass. The original performing lineup played a series of shows including The Montreal Metal Massacre at The Spectrum in Montreal, a show that also included Anvil, Razor, DBC, and others. For various reasons Lederman, Ellis, and Butts left the band, beginning with Lederman's departure in April 2006. Kirchin began to hold auditions. In the summer of 2006, the line-up was finalized: Mark Kopernicky (stage name Kinky Pork Cream, guitars), Gerry Keough (stage name Glace Frothfritter, drums), and Robert Tollefson (stage name Lobo Elf Snort, bass). After many live shows in Canada, the US, and in Europe, the band entered the studio in late 2007 to record the first album to feature an actual band. The album, entitled Metal Manifesto, was released in 2008. The band played shows in Canada and Europe during 2009, including a date at the Headbanger's Open Air festival in Itzehoe, Germany, in July.

The band was reassembled with new supporting members in 2009.

- Gord Kirchin (aka 'Pile Driver', vocals)
- Steve Macpherson (aka 'Reverend Tom Cheapness', guitar)
- Ken Gibson (aka 'Steele McFearsome', bass)
- Mark Macpherson (aka 'Hank Momscraper', drums)

This line-up has toured Brazil (fall 2017) and Colombia (2018), and played festivals such as Calgary MetalFest V (2016), Amsterdam Heavy Metal Maniacs (2018), and Storm Crusher Festival (2019), and headlined shows in Toronto, Ottawa, Montreal, and Quebec City.

Kirchin died from lung cancer at age 60 on September 22, 2022.

Rob Tollefson died from throat cancer on September 10, 2016.

== Discography ==
=== As Piledriver ===
- Metal Inquisition (LP, 1984)
- Stay Ugly (LP, 1986)

=== As The Exalted Piledriver ===
- Official Live Bootleg Shpinsk, Batslavia (DVD, 2005)
- Metal Manifesto / Promo '05 (Demo, 2005)
- Metal Manifesto (LP, 2008)
- Night of the Unpolished Turd (Live LP, 2011)
