= Impaler (band) =

American shock rock band

- Origin: St. Paul, Minnesota, U.S.
- Genres: Speed metal, heavy metal, punk rock, shock rock
- Years active: 1983–1992, 1994–present
- Members: Bill Lindsey; Court Hawley; Bradley Johnson; Dr. Corpse; Erin Ryan; Andy Radio
- Past members: Mike Senn; Meaty" Robert Johnson; John Stradinger; Tom Croxton; Ken LaMere; Erik Allyn (Mitchell); Nikki Nichols (David O'Steen); Ron Barna; Michael James Torok
- Website: Impaler on Facebook

Impaler is an American horror-themed heavy metal/speed metal band from Minnesota. The band has a theatrical show which features fake blood, cages, coffins, latex severed heads and a finale that includes a mock disemboweling of victims.

Impaler formed in the spring of 1983 with founding members Bill Lindsey (vocals), Michael James Torok (guitar), "Commander" Court Hawley (bass), Robert "Meaty Bob" Johnson (drums), and Mike Senn (guitar). The band played original songs sprinkled with a few covers by favorite influential bands such as Kiss, Alice Cooper, and Motörhead. Bill Lindsey is the sole continuing member of Impaler, keeping the band alive for over 30 years.

== History ==
=== Combat Records ===
Impaler recorded demo tapes which attracted the attention of Important Record Distributors and lead to the band being signed to the in-house labels IRD Records and Combat Records. They released two records with these labels, the EP Rise of the Mutants in (1985), which caused much controversy with Tipper Gore and her Parents Music Resource Center organization, and their debut LP If We Had Brains... We'd Be Dangerous in 1986, produced by Bob Mould of Hüsker Dü. Not continuing their relationship with Combat Records, the band went on to release many more albums with various labels.

=== 1990s ===
The 1990s was a prolific decade for Impaler, seeing the band release four albums. Wake Up Screaming! on Channel 83 Records with second guitarist John Stradinger, followed by a demo tape Sonic Freak Show in 1995 and a self-financed release on the band's own Vlad Productions titled Undead Things (1996). It Won't Die came out in 1998 after Impaler signed with Root of All Evil Records. That label also released One Nation Under Ground. The Gruesome Years featured the two Combat releases and additional bonus tracks, plus the Black Leather Monster 7-inch vinyl and a 7-inch EP titled The Mutants Rise Again for Danish label Horror Records. At this point, the band appeared at high-profile metal festivals like Milwaukee Metal Fest, New Jersey March Metal Meltdown, Classic Metal Fest and Expo of the Extreme, exposing fans to their raw punk/metal sound and energetic, theatrical stage show.

=== 2000s ===
Impaler continued with a high rate of output during the first decade of the 2000s, releasing four albums, including Old School Ghouls and Habeas Corpus, their last for Root of All Evil Records. Habeas Corpus marked the return of original bassist Court Hawley. The band signed with MVD Audio for the band's first official live recording, Alive Beyond the Grave, their first concept album, Cryptozoology (Creatures of God?), which marked the return of original guitarist Michael James Torok, the DVDs 20 Years Undead and House Band at the Funeral Parlor and two split 7-inch singles, one featuring fellow Minnesota band Ripsnorter and the other backed with two tracks by Iowa grind/crust band Black Market Fetus. In 2009, Lindsay contributed his recipe for Bloody Intestines and Worms to Hellbent for Cooking: The Heavy Metal Cookbook; however, the recipe clarifies that the ingredients are actually Italian sausage and onions. The following year Impaler released Chronicles of Terror (2010), an album containing old demos of their unreleased songs, as well as cover songs, a live show, and a twenty-page booklet that contained an interview with band members and rare photos of the group. Also released during the decade was the EP, 30 Year and Rising on Old Cemetery Records in 2012, the singles "Krampus" (2014) and "Cass Lake Christmas Massacre" (2017) along with their cover of "Go Away" on the compilation, Tribute to Eric Moore and The Godz, Vol. 3 Gotta Keep A Runnin, in 2017, in 2019 there were two new releases from the band "Live At First Ave" and the split EP with Ripsnorter "If Death Were A Horse".

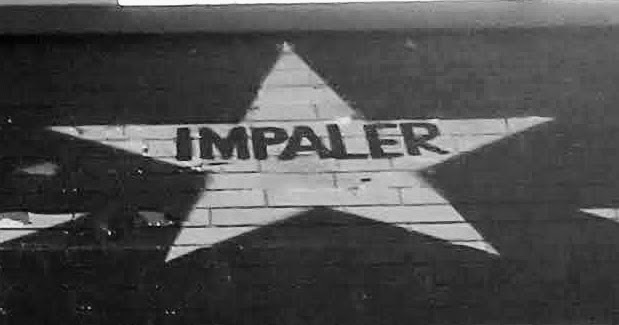
Impaler's star on the outside mural of the Minneapolis nightclub First Avenue

The band has been honored with a star on the outside mural of the Minneapolis nightclub First Avenue, recognizing performers that have played sold-out shows or have otherwise demonstrated a major contribution to the culture at the iconic venue. Receiving a star "might be the most prestigious public honor an artist can receive in Minneapolis," according to journalist Steve Marsh.

== Controversy ==
Impaler had much controversy in the 1980s with Tipper Gore and her P.M.R.C. group. During this time, Gore wanted the public to think of rock music as evil and as spreading violence and sexuality to young kids. When Rise of the Mutants was released in 1985, it struck the entertainment industry with its violent and gory album cover. Outside of Impaler concerts, protesters would burn the album and hang crosses. Tipper Gore tried to get the album off of record store shelves, but failed to do so, giving Impaler more publicity than they expected.

In 1996, when Undead Things was released, it sparked controversy with Best Buy. Best Buy tried to remove the CD from store shelves thinking the cover was too graphic, showing Lindsey split open with surgical tools still attached to him.

== Lyrical themes ==
Impaler's lyrics involve B-movie horror tropes such as Halloween, ghouls, ghosts, monsters, witches, and skeletons. Some of Impaler's songs have sexual meanings to them, most notably "Crack That Whip" and "Breathing Down Your Back". Impaler has never wanted their songs to deal with religion.

== Members ==
Present members

- Bill Lindsey – vocals (1983–present)
- Bradley Johnson – guitar, backing vocals (1996–2008, 2017–present)
- "Commander" Court Hawley – bass, backing vocals (1983–1992, 2004–present)
- "Dr. Corpse" Zach Lindsey – backing vocals (1999–present)
- Erin Ryan – drums (1987–1990, 2017–present)
- Andy Radio – guitar, backing vocals (2017–present)

Past members

- Mike Senn – guitar, backing vocals (1983–1987)
- "Meaty" Bob Johnson – drums (1983–1987; died 2017)
- Tom Croxton – drums (1999–2017)
- Ken LaMere – drums (1991–1992)
- John Stradinger – guitar (1987–1992)
- David "Nikki Nichols" O'Steen – guitar, backing vocals (1994–1996)
- Ron Barna – drums (1994–1999)
- "Erik Allyn" Mitchell – bass, backing vocals (1994–2004; died 2018)
- Michael Torok – guitar, backing vocals (1983–1992, 2009–2017)
- "Killer" Kyle Skogquist — guitar, backing vocals (2006–2016)

Timeline

== Discography ==
=== Studio albums ===
- If We Had Brains... We'd Be Dangerous! (1986)
- Wake Up Screaming! (1990)
- Undead Things (1996)
- It Won't Die (1998)
- One Nation Under Ground (2000)
- Old School Ghouls (2002)
- Habeas Corpus (2005)
- Cryptozoology (Creatures of God?) (2009)
- The Great Hereafter (2021)

=== EPs ===
- Rise of the Mutants (1985)
- The Mutants Rise Again (2002)
- 30 Years and Rising (2012)
- If Death Were A Horse (2019)

=== Demos ===
- Fear No Evil Demo (1982)
- Demo 1 (1983)
- Demo 2 (1983)
- Demo 3 (1984)
- Demo '87 (1987)
- Minneapolis School of Arts Demo (1990)
- Daddy Raw Demo (1992)
- Sonic Freak Show (1995)
- Meat Wagon demo (1996)

=== Compilations ===
- The Gruesome Years (1998)
- Chronicles of Terror (2010)
- Troma Film's Poultrygeist soundtrack (2008)
- Combat's Bullets (1986)
- Tribute to Eric Moore and The Godz, Vol 3 Gotta Keep A Runnin (2017)

=== Videos ===
- 20 Years Undead (2004)
- House Band at the Funeral Parlor (2006)

=== Live albums ===
- Alive Beyond the Grave (2006)
- Live At First Ave (2019)

=== Singles ===
- "Black Leather Monster" (1998)
- "666 Dreary Lane" (2004)
- "Krampus" (2014)
- "Cass Lake Christmas Massacre" (2017)
