= Oz (band) =

Finnish heavy metal band

OZ
- Origin: Nakkila, Finland (1977-1983) Stockholm, Sweden (1983-present)
- Genres: Heavy metal, power metal
- Years active: 1977-1991; 2010-present
- Labels: Kräk (1982), Tyfon (1982-1987), Combat (1984), Far East Metal Syndicate (1984), Banzai (1984), RCA (1984-1987), Victoria Records (1987), Black Mark (1991), AFM (2011-2018), Spiritual Beast (2011), Metalizer (2011), Massacre Records (2018-present)
- Members: Mark Ruffneck; Peppi Peltola; Juzzy Kangas; Johnny Cross; Vince Koivula
- Past members: Ape DeMartini; Jay C. Blade; Markku Petander; Costello Hautamäki; Michael Lundholm; Fredrik Thörnholm; Jörgen Schelander; Tobbe Moen; Spooky Wolff; Speedy Foxx; Esa Niva; Kari Elo; Tauno Vajavaara
- Website: ozofficial.com

Oz (styled as OZ) is a Finnish heavy metal band, originally from Nakkila, Finland. It was formed in 1977, split in 1991 and re-established 2010.

Since 1983, OZ has been active mostly in Sweden as the band members moved to Stockholm after the release of their second album. In 2010, drummer Mark Ruffneck (born Pekka Mark), bassist and main songwriter Jay C. Blade (born Jukka Homi, but has changed his name to Jukka Lewis) and vocalist Ape De Martini (born Tapani Hämäläinen) re-formed the band, together with Costello Hautamäki and Markku Petander. As of 2016, OZ consists of four different members from Pori, Finland with Ruffneck being the original sole member.

They made a splash with their 1983 album Fire in the Brain, a NWOBHM-flavored energetic metal affair that won over critics and fans alike. The subsequent albums, however, failed to elicit the same response, and the band faded from worldwide view. The band reformed in 2010 and released Burning Leather in 2011. The album Transition State was released on 20 October 2017 by AFM Records. The latest album, Forced Commandments, was released in May 2020 by Massacre Records.

== Line-up ==
=== Current members ===
- Mark Ruffneck (Pekka Mark) – drums, percussion (1977–1991, 2010–present)
- Peppi Peltola - bass, vocals (2015–present)
- Juzzy Kangas - guitars, vocals (2015–present)
- Johnny Cross - guitars, vocals (2015–present)
- Vince Koivula – lead vocals (2016–present)

=== Former live musicians ===
- Michel Santunione - guitar
- John Berg - guitar
- Johannes Sandberg - bass

=== Former members ===
- Ape De Martini (Tapani Hämäläinen) – lead vocals (1977–1991, 2010–2016)
- Jay C. Blade (Jukka Lewis) – bass, vocals (1982–1987, 2010–2016)
- Markku Petander – guitars (2010–2011)
- Costello Hautamäki - guitars (2010)
- Michael Lundholm – guitars (1990–1991)
- Jörgen Schelander – keyboards (1990–1991)
- Fredrik Thörnholm – bass (1990–1991)
- Tobbe Moen – bass (1990)
- Spooky Wolff – guitars (1983–1987)
- Speedy Foxx – guitars (1983–1987)
- Esa Niva – guitars (1982–1983)
- Tauno Vajavaara – bass (1977-1982)
- Kari Elo – guitars (1977-1982)

== Discography ==
=== Studio albums ===
- Heavy Metal Heroes (OZ) (1982)
- Fire in the Brain (1983)
- III Warning (1984)
- ...Decibel Storm... (1986)
- Roll the Dice (1991)
- Dominator (Promo CD) (2011)
- Burning Leather (2011)
- Transition State (2017)
- Forced Commandments (2020)

=== EPs ===
- 1984 – Turn the Cross Upside Down

=== Singles ===
- 1982 – "Second-Hand Lady" / "Rather Knight"
- 2011 - "Dominator"
- 2012 – "The Show Must Go On" / "Signs from the Dead"
- 2023 - "Undercover" / "Wicked Vices"

=== Compilation albums ===
- 1987 – III Warning + ...Decibel Storm...
- 2012 – Vinyl Tracks

== See also ==
- New wave of British heavy metal
