= Brainfever =

German heavy metal band

- Origin: Cologne, North Rhine-Westphalia, Germany
- Genres: Speed metal, heavy metal, power metal
- Years active: 1970s, 1983 - 1987, 2016 - present
- Labels: Mausoleum, Bellaphon, Steamhammer
- Members: Marco Böttcher; Mario Simon; Heinz Schreiber; Michael Jakobs
- Past members: Wollo Reddig; Eric Hirschhäuser; Frank Marowsky; Horst Neumann

Brainfever is a German heavy metal band from Cologne. The band was initially active in the 1970s, but reformed in 1983. The band reformed a second time in 2016. The band has released two full-length studio albums, Capture the Night in 1984 and Face to Face in 1986. In 1988 they released the EP "You".

== Members ==
=== Current lineup ===
- Marco Böttcher - guitar
- Mario Simon - vocals
- Heinz Schreiber - bass
- Michael Jakobs - drums

=== Past members ===
- Wollo Reddig - keyboards
- Eric Hirschhäuser - drums
- Frank Marowsky - drums
- Horst Neumann - vocals

== Discography ==
- Capture the Night (1984, Mausoleum)
- Face to Face (1986, Bellaphon)
- You (1988, Steamhammer)
