= Philadelphia (band) =

- Origin: Shreveport, Louisiana
- Genres: Christian metal
- Years active: 1982–1987
- Labels: Patmos Records

Philadelphia was a Christian metal band from Shreveport, Louisiana. The Encyclopedia of Contemporary Christian Music describes them as having been unjustly condemned by "the slings and arrows of fundamentalist bigotry" for their musical style and lyrics. Their name is a reference to the church of Philadelphia in Revelation 3 verses 7-10.

Musically, the band was characterized as being "Harder than Rez and more intense than Daniel Band and Barnabas."

== Background ==
The band was originally a general market band called Survivor. After breaking up in 1981, the members found Christianity through independent experiences. They reunited in 1982 as a Christian band and produced their first LP, Tell The Truth in 1984. Their styling was not well received by the entire Christian community, for which metal was still a fringe sound. While one publication found that the band emphasized "ministry and outreach through their direct and hard hitting lyrics," others saw the same as inappropriately descriptive and judgmental. For their lyrics and style the band garnered the scorn of some national religious media.

In 1985 the band appeared at Cornerstone and released a second album entitled Search and Destroy. Its lyrics were controversial as well, as the release tackled social issues such as child abuse, drug abuse and runaways through the eyes of a character named Bobby. One reviewer called the result an "overly serious tone and melodramatic feel." Brian Clark responded to the bands critics, stating that "Bobby is part and parcel of all these American tragedies, and Jesus is shown to be real and relevant."

A third project entitled Warlord was planned, and tracks recorded, but never released. Some tracks from the project, along with a few newly recorded ones, were rereleased by M8 Records along with their studio albums in 2000.

In 2016, Warlord was released on the band's own label, Philly Music. Members are the original core trio, Brian Martini on drums, Phil Scholling on guitars and Brian 'Wulfie' Clark on bass and vocals. The title track is the same one written 30 years ago, recorded in the studio for the first time, with the balance of the release all new material written by Scholling and Clark.

== Members ==
- Brian Martini - drums
- Brian Clark - bass, vocals
- Ronn Flowers - guitar
- Phil Scholling - guitar

== Discography ==
- 1984: Tell The Truth (Patmos)
- 1985: Search and Destroy
- 2016: Warlord (Philly Music)
