= Terraplane (band) =

English pop rock band

Terraplane were a 1980s rock band from London, England. Composed of five musicians, they released two albums before disbanding in 1988. The band featured three musicians who would go on to form the hard rock act, Thunder.

They are distinct from the German psychedelic groove rock band Terraplane, based in Wernigerode, which released three albums between 2000 and 2007: Psychedelic Wonderland, Into the Unknown and Low Tide and Shockwave.

== History ==
Singer Danny Bowes, guitarist Luke Morley and drummer Harry James and bassist Nick Linden were the original recording line-up. After releasing a single on the independent 'City' label, they soon signed with Epic Records. With the much-delayed debut album almost completely recorded, they recruited second guitarist Rudi Rivière in time for him to appear on just one track on that release. That first studio album, Black and White (originally titled Talking to God on the Great White Telephone) was released by Epic Records in January 1986 and was well received by critics. However, by 1987 their record label was exerting pressure on the band to follow up with another album of a soulful direction, with the resulting album Moving Target alienating the band's fan base.

Morley, Bowes and James regrouped in 1989 to form Thunder; all three remain in that band as of December 2023.

== Discography ==
=== Albums ===
- Black and White (Epic, 1985) – UK Albums Chart No. 74
- Moving Target (Epic, 1987)
- We Survive (compilation album) (Castle, 2005)

=== Singles ===
- "I Survive" (City Records, 1983) [b/w "Gimme The Money", "Turn Me Loose", "I Want Your Body"] UK No. 108
- "I Can't Live Without Your Love" (Epic, 1985) UK No. 78
- "When You're Hot" (Epic, 1985) UK No. 186
- "Talking to Myself" (Epic, 1985) UK No. 103
- "If That's What It Takes" (Epic, 1986) UK No. 106
- "Good Thing Going" (Epic, 1987) UK No. 131
- "Moving Target" (Epic, 1987) UK No. 188

== See also ==
- List of new wave of British heavy metal bands
