= 220 Volt (band) =

Swedish heavy metal band

- Also known as: Voltergeist (1990–1992)
- Origin: Östersund, Sweden
- Genres: Heavy metal; doom metal; hard rock
- Years active: 1979–1992, 2002–present
- Labels: CBS, Epic, Swedmetal Records
- Members: Mats Karlsson; Thomas Drevin; Peter Hermansson; Anders Engberg
- Past members: Mike Krusenberg; Christer Nääs; Tommy Hellström; Pelle Hansson; Jocke Lundholm; Peter Olander; Per Englund
- Website: http://www.220volt.se

220 Volt is a Swedish heavy metal band, formed in 1979 by guitar players Thomas Drevin and Mats Karlsson. The band released albums on the CBS Records and Epic Records labels.

== History ==
The band's career began in 1979, but gained traction when they released their first single "Prisoner Of War" in 1982. When a radio station in New Jersey aired the single, it soon became a popular hit, which led to the record company CBS offering them a record contract.

Their first album 220 Volt was released in 1983 and sold around 10,000 copies in Sweden alone. In addition to Sweden, the band gained popularity in Japan, Germany and the United States. In 1984, the band performed with Nazareth (12 concerts) and in 1986 with AC/DC (7 concerts).

In 1992, 220 Volt disbanded. They reformed again in 2002 with their original lineup, and organized concerts in Jämtland and other locations around Sweden. They later released a compilation album, Volume 1 at the same year, which contains both new material and highlights of their live concert from Sweden Rock 2002. The printed edition was limited to 1000 copies, but is currently available on iTunes.

In 2005, the band released its first live album, Made in Jämtland that featured their live gigs in Jämtland. At the end of 2008, drummer Peter Hermansson left the band, but returned in 2012 and remains active.

In 2009, the band recorded a new EP with new versions of their popular single "Heavy Christmas" alongside 3 other songs. Former lead vocalist Jocke Lundholm returned for this recording and the album also featured Björn Höglund of folk rock band Hoven Droven. The album was released under the title Heavy Christmas – Revisited.

== Members ==
Current members

- Mats Karlsson – guitars & backing vocals (1979–1992, 2002–present; 1992–1993 in Voltergeist)
- Thomas Drevin – guitars & backing vocals (1979–1984, 2002–present)
- Peter Hermansson – drums & backing vocals (1982–1992, 2002–2008, 2012–present; on hiatus since 2020 due to injury; 1992–1993 in Voltergeist)
- Mats Vassfjord – bass & backing vocals (2016–present)
- Fredrik Nordh – lead vocals (2024–present)

Former members

- Mike "Larsson" Krusenberg – bass & backing vocals (ca. 1982–1992, 2002–2013; 1992–1993 in Voltergeist)
- Christer Nääs – lead vocals (1979–1983, 2002–2008)
- Tommy Hellström – bass (1979–1980)
- Pelle Hansson – drums (1979–1982)
- Jocke Lundholm – lead vocals (1983–1992, 1997, 2009)
- Peter Olander – guitar & backing vocals (1984–1992; 1992–1993 in Voltergeist)
- Per Englund – lead vocals (1992–1993 in Voltergeist)
- Anders Engberg – lead vocals (2013–2015)
- Göran Nyström – lead vocals (2016–2024)

Touring and session members

- Björn Höglund – drums & backing vocals (2009, 2021–2022, 2024–present)
- Johan Niemann – bass (2013–2014)
- Lars Ericsson – bass (2014)
- Peter Hallgren – bass & backing vocals (2014–2016)
- Robin Eriksson – lead vocals (2015)
- Matti Alfonzetti – lead vocals (2016)
- David Wallin – drums (one-off 2021)
- Peter Lundgren – drums (2022)

Timeline

== Discography ==
Studio albums

- 220 Volt (1983, CBS)
- Powergames (1984, CBS)
- Mind Over Muscle (1985, CBS)
- Eye to Eye (1988, Epic)
- Lethal Illusion (1997, Empire Records; recorded between 1989 and 1992) (digitally released 2009)
- Walking in Starlight (2014, AOR Heaven)

EP

- Heavy Christmas (1987, CBS)
- Heavy Christmas – Revisited (2009) (Digitally released 2009)

Compilations

- Electric Messengers (released for the U.S. market 1985, Epic)
- Young and Wild (1987, CBS)
- Volume 1 (2002) (digitally released 2009)

Live albums

- Made in Jamtland (live) (2005, Swedmetal Records) (digitally released 2009)

Digital single;

- "One Good Reason" (2013)
