= Warrant (German band) =

German speed metal band

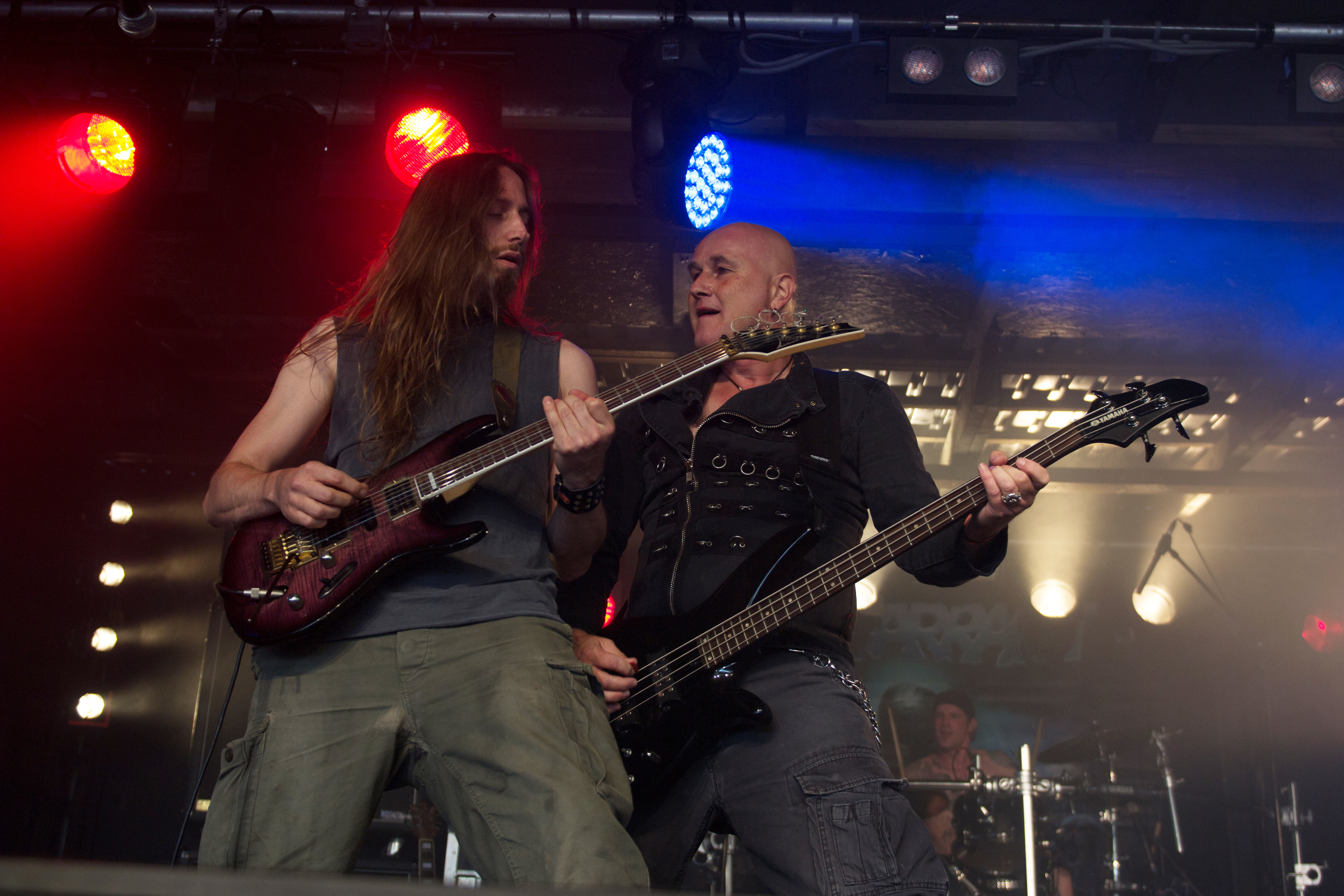
- Warrant at Headbangers Open Air 2017

Background information
- Origin: Düsseldorf, Germany
- Genres: Speed metal, heavy metal
- Years active: 1983–1985, 1999–present
- Labels: Noise, Pure Steel
- Members: Jörg Juraschek; Michael Dietz; Marius Lamm; Adrian Eric Weiss
- Website: warrant.band

Warrant is a German speed metal band. It was formed in Düsseldorf in 1983 by Jörg Juraschek (vocals, bass), Thomas Klein (guitar) and Lothar Wieners (drums).

They went on tour with Warlock in 1985, after releasing an EP and an LP. The band soon split up. In 1999, they briefly reunited and recorded two new songs. Both of Warrant's albums were reissued on a single disc in 2000 with the new tracks included. In August 2010, Pure Steel Records announced the re-release of the albums.

In October 2014, after a break that lasted almost 30 years, Warrant released their third studio album, Metal Bridge.

== Members ==
Current

- Jörg Juraschek – vocals, bass (1983–1985, 1999–present)
- Michael Dietz – guitars (2015–present)
- Marius Lamm – drums (2022–present)
- Adrian Eric Weiss – guitars (2022–present)

Former

- Arno Verstraten – drums
- Lothar Wieners – drums
- Thomas Franke – drums
- Thomas Rosemann – drums
- Randy Tomlin – drums
- Thomas Klein – guitars (1983–1985) (died 2025)
- Oliver May – guitars (1985, 1999–2011)
- Dirk Preylowski – guitars (2011–2015)

== Discography ==
Studio albums

- The Enforcer (1985)
- Metal Bridge (2014)
- The Speed of Metal (2025)

EPs

- First Strike (1985)
