= Obús =

Spanish heavy metal band

- Origin: Madrid, Spain
- Genres: Hard rock, Heavy metal
- Years active: 1980–present
- Members: Fructuoso Sánchez, Fortu; Francisco Laguna, Paco; Fernando Montesinos; Carlos Mirat
- Past members: Manolo Caño; Juan Luis Serrano; Tío Luis; Peter Oteo; Nacho GG-R
- Website: www.obusrock.com

Obús is a Spanish heavy metal band founded in Madrid, Spain in 1980. They are known for spectacular live concerts.

== History ==
=== Formation ===
Juan Luis Serrano and Francisco Laguna, (bass and guitar), who had been together in other bands such as Red Box or Madrid 20, formed Obús in Madrid early in 1980.

=== Success ===
In 1981, they won the Rock festival of Villa de Madrid, and opened for the already established band, Barón Rojo. Soon after, they recorded Prepárate, produced by record producer and Spanish singer Tino Casal. This first album was successful and the title song peaked at number 1 in the 40 Principales radio station, the Spanish Top 40 chart. On 6 November 1981, the band presented the album in a massive concert at the Real Madrid stadium.

Their 1982 album, Poderoso como el Trueno (produced as well by Tino Casal), and their following release, El que Más (1984), saw a high volume of album sales. This last album was recorded with sound engineer Mark Dodson (producer of Judas Priest), and included the popular hits, "El que más", "Autopista", "La raya", "FM", "Alguien" and "Viviré". "Alguien" was written by Adrian Smith from Iron Maiden. Obús performed at big concerts festivals such as the concerts of June 1985 in the Casa de Campo, in the Spanish Communist Party (PCE) annual festival, in front of over 20,000 people. The official live album, recorded in the pavilion of sports of Madrid on 21 February 1987 is considered their apex. It was followed by a period with ups and downs until they presented their studio album, Otra Vez En la Ruta, in 1990. The band subsequently undertook a hiatus.

=== Hiatus ===
During the time they were separated, Fortu joined Saratoga, a band made up by veteran rock musicians from bands such as Barón Rojo, Muro and Santa. A band with former members of such successful bands was thought to be impossible at the time, however, the collaboration between members gave birth to one of the best bands in the Spanish metal scene. Their first album, Saratoga, managed to bring a full house to the Sala Agualung, in Madrid, one of the most popular live music venues in the city. Fortu left the band after recording their second album, Tributo. Meanwhile, Serrano and Fernando started their own rock band, called Venganza.

=== Revival ===
Despite other musicial obligations, Paco remained committed to eventually revive the band. Just a week after Fortu abandoned his band Saratoga, Venganza decided to split and Obús was revived in 1996.

Originally scheduled to take place at a festival in which Panzer and Judas Priest were also to perform, the deal fell through. However, they decided to go on tour on their own. At the time, the heavy metal scene in Spain was falling out of grace, and younger generations grew interested in older bands. Because of this, Obús struggled to reach a broader audience. But after the success of the tour, they start thinking of recording a new album. In October 2000, the band released Desde el fondo del abismo.

=== Line up changes ===
In 2004, during the tour "Segundos fuera", Serrano left the band and Peter Oteo replaced him. They incorporated Nacho GG-R as bassist to the band. In 2008, Fernando experienced heath issues which led him to leave the band, being replaced by Carlos Mirat. In 2009, during a tour around South America, Nacho GG-R left the band and Pepe Bao (bassist of O'funk'illo) substituted him.

== Discography ==
- Prepárate (1981)
- Poderoso como el trueno (1982)
- El que más (1984)
- Pega con fuerza (1985)
- Dejarse la piel (1986)
- En directo 21-2-87 (1987) (Live)
- Otra vez en la ruta (1990)
- Desde el fondo del abismo (2000)
- Segundos fuera (2003)
- Vamos muy bien (2006)
- Cállate! (2010)
- De Madrid al Infierno (2012) (Live)
- Sirena de metal (2014)
- Con un par!! (2019)

== Members ==
- From 1980 to 1981
  - Juan Luis Serrano (Bass), (Vocals)
  - Francisco Laguna (Guitar), (Vocals)
  - Manolo Caño (Drummer)
- From 1981 to 1991 and from 1996 to 2004
  - Fructuoso "Fortu" Sánchez (Lead vocals)
  - Juan Luis Serrano (Bass) (Background vocals)
  - Francisco Laguna (Guitar) (Background vocals)
  - Fernando Sánchez (Drummer) (Background vocals)
- From 2004 to 2010
  - Fructuoso "Fortu" Sánchez (Lead vocals)
  - Peter Oteo – Nacho García – Pepe Bao (Bass) (Background vocals)
  - Francisco Laguna (Guitar) (Background vocals)
  - Fernando Sánchez – Carlos Mirat (Drummer) (Background vocals)
- From 2010 until present
  - Fructuoso "Fortu" Sánchez (Lead vocals)
  - Paco Laguna (Guitar) (Background vocals)
  - Fernando Montesinos (Bass) (Background vocals)
  - Carlos Mirat (Drummer) (Background vocals)
