= Vanadium (band) =

Italian heavy metal band

- Origin: Milan, Italy
- Genres: Heavy metal; hard rock
- Years active: 1980–1990; 1995–1996
- Labels: Durium, Green Line, NAR International

Vanadium was an Italian heavy metal band from Milan, Italy. It was one of the first heavy rock bands to appear on the Peninsula and is considered among the most successful European exponents of the genre.

== History ==
Vanadium were founded in Milan in 1980 by Stefano Tessarin (guitar), Ruggero Zanolini (keyboards), Domenico Prantera (bass), Lio Mascheroni (drums) and Pino Scotto (vocals). Musically influenced by bands like Deep Purple, Thin Lizzy, Uriah Heep, Black Sabbath and Judas Priest, they had a difficult start due to scarce popularity of the metal genre in Italy, but managed to obtain a reasonable degree of success abroad. Following the break through of their first single We Want to Live with Rock 'n' Roll (Durium, 1981), they went on to record seven studio albums and the live On Streets of Danger (1985). Their third album, Game Over (1984), is possibly their most successful, with figure sales of about 54,000 copies.

The band's 1987 album Corruption of Innocence pictured the band wearing glam metal costumes despite the album's music style continuing to be straight-up heavy metal. Their fans turned away from them in favour of more extreme metal groups. Following the collapse of their label Durium in 1988, Vanadium recorded their last album Seventheaven with GreenLine before breaking up in 1990. They temporarily reformed in 1995 and released their only album entirely sang in Italian, Nel cuore del caos. Despite showing good form, the album wasn't commercially successful, and the band split up again and for good after a final tour.

After the demise of Vanadium, the band members pursued solo projects. Stefano Tessarin, with Ruggero Zanolini and Lio Mascheroni formed the band Rustless. Pino Scotto went on to start a solo career and recorded eight albums. Domenico Prantera retired from playing music professionally and started managing emerging bands.

On 11 May 2014, the Italian publisher Crac Edizioni published the official Vanadium biography authored by music journalist Luca Fassina.

== Discography ==
=== Albums ===
- Metal Rock - 1982
- A Race with the Devil - 1983
- Game Over - 1984
- Born to Fight - 1986
- Corruption of Innocence - 1987
- Seventheaven - 1989
- Nel cuore del caos - 1995

=== Live albums ===
- On Streets of Danger - 1985

=== Singles ===
- We Want to Live with Rock 'n' Roll/Heavy Metal - 1981
- Take My Blues Away/Take My Blues Away (extended version) - 1989
