= Axewitch =

Swedish heavy metal band

- Origin: Sweden
- Genres: Heavy metal
- Years active: 1981–1987, 2007–present
- Label: Web Records
- Members: Anders Wallentoft (lead vocals); Magnus Jarl (guitar); Mikael A'delid (guitar); Björn Hernborg (bass); Mats Johansson (drums)
- Past members: Tommy Brage (bass); Klas Wollberg (guitar); Magnus Hedin (bass); Abbey (drums); Ralf Petersson (guitar); Per-Ove Johansson (drums); Denny Printz (bass); Lasse Fallman

Axewitch is a Swedish heavy metal band formed around 1981 in Linköping. The band broke up in 1987 but reunited in 2007.

== History ==
Axewitch was created by Anders Wallentoft (vocals) and Magnus Jarl (guitar). They were soon joined by Tommy Brage (bass guitar) and brothers Mikael Johansson (guitar) and Mats Johansson (drums). This was the original line-up.

Axewitch won a contest where the first prize was to record in a studio. At the end of 1981, they recorded the EP, Pray for Metal, released in late 1982. The EP was not a success, but the band continued to play gigs and, in 1983, released its first full-length album, The Lord of Flies.

After the release of their second full-length album, Visions from the Past, all members except Wallentoft and Jarl left the band. Axewitch released another album in 1985 before eventually breaking up in 1987 with many members coming and going and never releasing any new material. At the time, Jarl went on to create a band called Sleazy Rose and ex-drummer Mats Johansson joined some of the former Mindless Sinner members to play in a band called Skinny Horse. Anders Wallentoft went on to another band called Regent.

== Reunion ==
In May 2007, Axewitch reunited with members Anders Wallentoft, Magnus Jarl, Mikael Johansson (whose surname now is A'delid), totally new member Lasse Fallman (bass guitar) and Mats Johansson. The band played two gigs in their home town Linköping and at the Sweden Rock Festival in 2008 and began working on a new album. In March 2012, Lasse Fallman decided to quit the band and Björn Hernborg became the new bass player and the production of the new album continued.

Axewitch's first studio album in 36 years, Out of the Ashes Into the Fire, was released on 30 April 2021.

== Discography ==
- 1982: Pray for Metal (EP)
- 1983: The Lord of Flies
- 1984: Visions of the Past
- 1985: Hooked on High Heels
- 2021: Out of the Ashes Into the Fire

== Members ==
- Anders Wallentoft (1981–1987, 2007–)
- Magnus Jarl (1981–1987, 2007–)
- Mikael A'delid (1981–1984, 2007–)
- Björn Hernborg (2012–)
- Mats Johansson (1981–1984, 2007–)
- Tommy Brage (1981–1984)
- Klas Wollberg (1985–1986)
- Magnus Hedin (1984–1987)
- Abbey (1985–1987)
- Ralf Petersson (1986–1987)
- Per-Ove Johansson (1987)
- Denny Printz (1987)
- Lasse Fallman (2007–2012)
