= Mad Max (band) =

German hard rock band

Mad Max Legacy
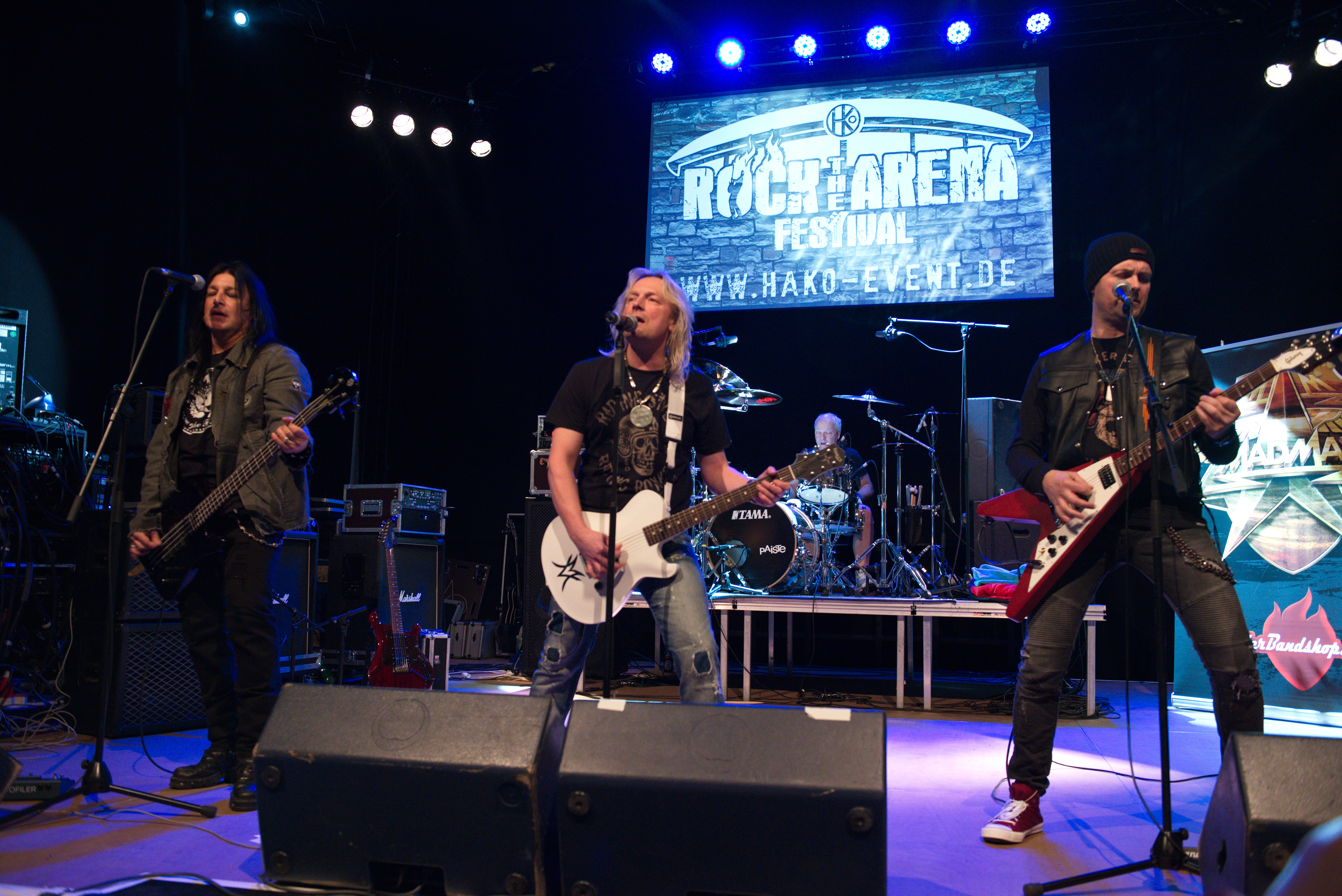
- Mad Max performing in 2016

Background information
- Origin: Münster, West Germany
- Genres: Hard rock, heavy metal
- Years active: 1981–1989, 1999–present
- Labels: Roadrunner, AOR Heaven, A-minor, Steamhammer, ADR Music
- Members: Jürgen Breforth; Axel Kruse; Dethy Borchardt; Fabian Ranft; Steven "Screamz" Brennan
- Past members: Thomas Hoffmann; Uwe Starck; Wilfried Schneider; Andreas Baesler; Jürgen Sander; Michael Voss; Roland Bergmann; Christopher Wegmann; Keith Ellis; Carsten Tischer; Yogi Spittka; Hans in 't Zandt; Jos Zoomer; Thomas "Hutch" Bauer; Emre "Emmo" Acar; Jullian Rolinger

Mad Max Legacy (Previously Mad Max) is a German hard rock band from Münster. In 1988, the band consisted of Michael Voss (vocals), Jürgen Breforth (guitars), Roland Bergmann and Axel Kruse (drums). Mad Max's self-titled release was in 1982. They faded away in 1989. Voss and Breforth reunited and put out a comeback album in 1999. At the beginning of 2015, bassist Roland Bergmann left Mad Max, leaving Breforth as the only original member of the band.

The band announced in January 2021 via their official site that Voss had left the band to focus on other projects. In September, they announced their new vocalist, Julian Rolinger, with whom they recorded the album Wings of Time (2022).

== Discography ==
- Mad Max (1982), Roadrunner
- Rollin' Thunder (1984), Roadrunner
- Stormchild (1985), Roadrunner
- Night of Passion (1987), Roadrunner
- Never Say Never (1999), AOR Heaven
- Night of White Rock (2006), AOR Heaven
- In White EP (2006), AOR Heaven
- White Sands (2007), AOR Heaven
- Here We Are (2008), A-minor
- Welcome America (2010), A-minor
- Another Night of Passion (2012), Steamhammer
- Interceptor (2013), Steamhammer
- 35 (2018), Steamhammer
- Stormchild Rising (2020), Steamhammer
- Wings of Time (2022), Rock of Angels
- Best of 40 Years - Rollin' Thunder, Stormchild & Night of Passion (2024), ADR Music
- Stories of Destiny (2026), ROAR

== Members ==
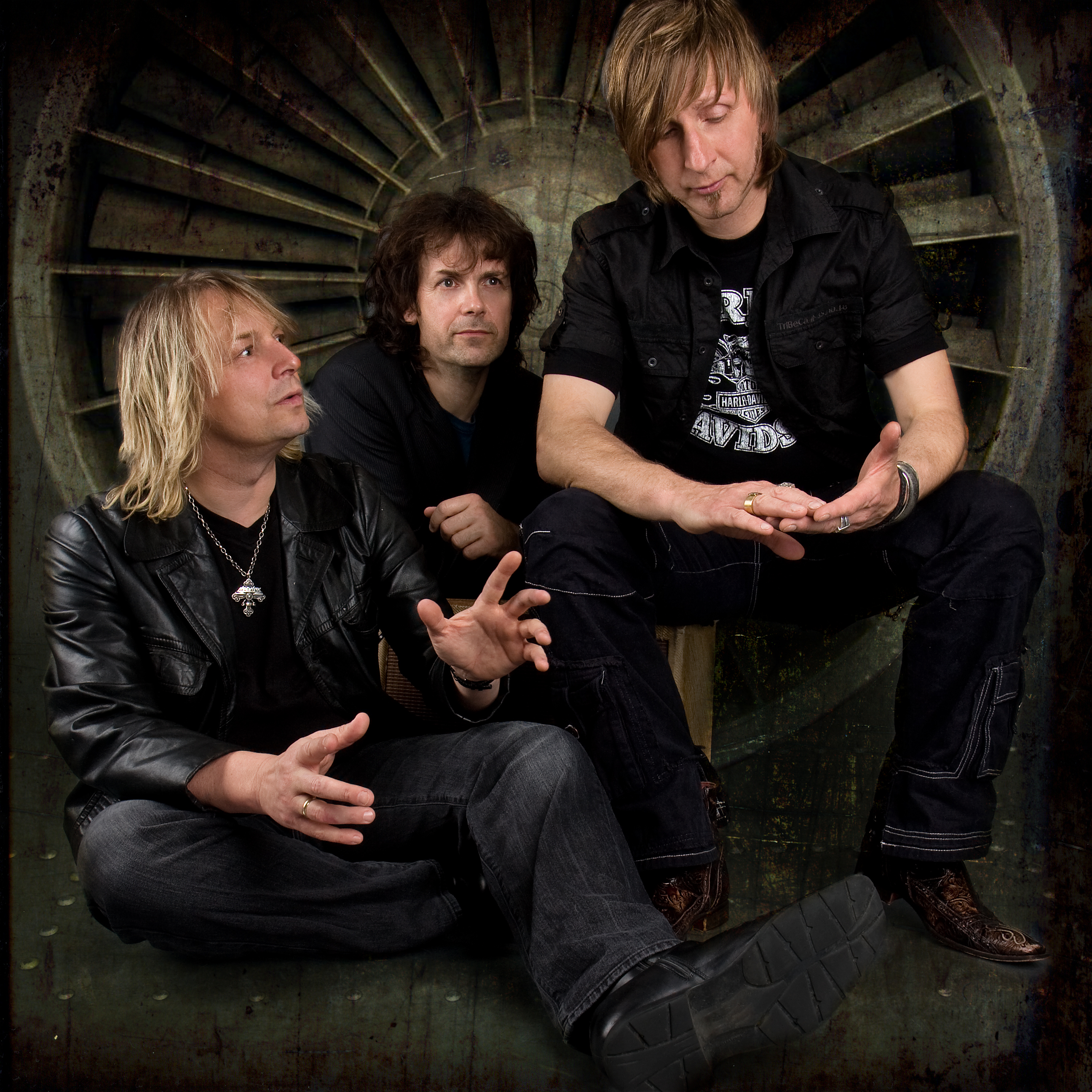
Mad Max in 2009

Current members

- Jürgen Breforth – rhythm guitars, backing vocals (1981–1989, 1999–present)
- Axel Kruse – drums (1984–1989, 2005–2007, 2011–present)
- Dethy Borchardt – guitars (2022–present)
- Fabian Ranft – bass, backing vocals (2020–present)
- Steven "Screamz" Brennan – lead vocals (2023 –present)

Former members

- Thomas Hoffmann – bass (1981–1982)
- Uwe Starck – drums (1981–1984)
- Wilfried Schneider – guitar (1981–1984)
- Andreas Baesler – lead vocals (1981–1983)
- Jürgen Sander – bass (1982–1984)
- Michael Voss – lead vocals (1983–1987, 1999–2020), lead guitar (1985–1987, 1999–2020)
- Roland Bergmann – bass, backing vocals (1984–1989, 2005–2015)
- Christopher Wegmann – guitars (1984–1989)
- Keith Ellis – lead vocals (1987–1989; died 2016)
- Carsten Tischer – bass (1999)
- Yogi Spittka – drums (1999)
- Hans in 't Zandt – drums (2008–2011)
- Jos Zoomer – drums (2008)
- Thomas "Hutch" Bauer – bass (2015–2020)
- Emre "Emmo" Acar – lead vocals (2020–2021)
- Julian Rolinger – lead vocals (2021-2023)
