= Ostrogoth (band) =

Belgian heavy metal band

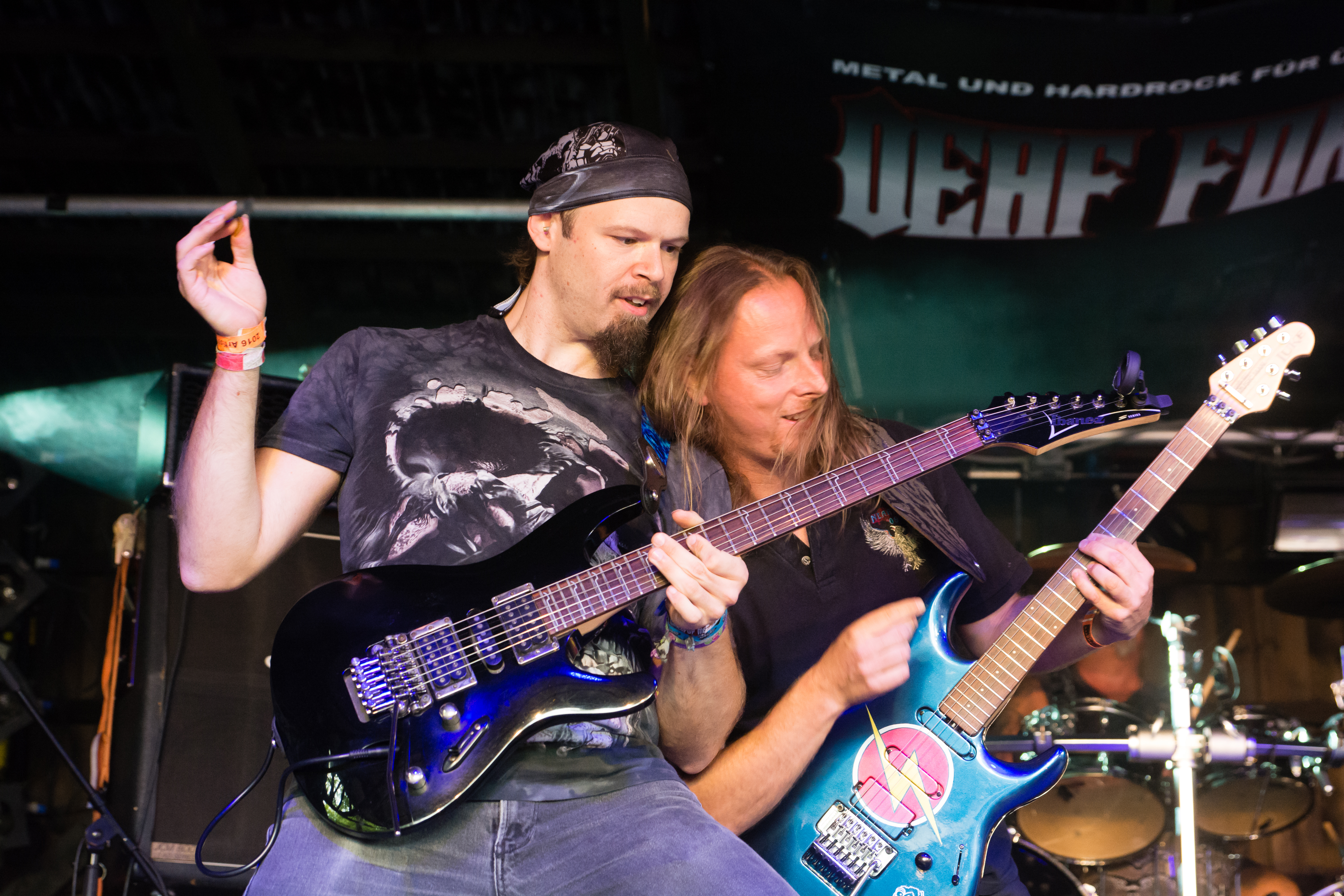
- Dario Frodo and Tom Tas

Background information
- Origin: Ghent, Belgium
- Genres: Heavy metal, power metal
- Years active: 1980–1988, 2002, 2010–present
- Labels: Mausoleum Records, Ultraprime Records, Empire Records
- Members: Mario "Grizzly" Pauwels; Fré Ost
- Past members: See below
- Website: Official website

Ostrogoth is a Belgian heavy metal band, formed in 1980 in Ghent.

The group is influenced by other successful European metal bands such as Scorpions and Accept. After an EP and two albums, Full Moon's Eyes, Ecstasy and Danger and Too Hot, the band went through a major line-up change for 1987's Feelings of Fury, following which the band disbanded.

Over these years, they supported, amongst others, Def Leppard, Manowar, Vandenberg, Loudness, Uriah Heep and Gary Moore.

In 2002, Ostrogoth reunited for a string of Belgian shows featuring both Marc 'Red Star' De Brauwer and Peter De Wint on vocals, each representing the material of their time with the band. In 2010, Ostrogoth briefly reunited with singer Marc De Brauwer, who was replaced by Josey Hindrix. Several years later, the band started working on new material and recorded the EP, Last Tribe Standing, which was released in 2015. Another major line-up change occurred in 2018.

== Members ==
Current members

- Mario "Grizzly" Pauwels – drums (1980–1988, 2002, 2010–present)
- Fré Ost - guitars (2018-present)

Former members

- Bram Engelen - guitars (2020-2026)
- Emile Marcelis - bass (2025 - 2026)
- Gerry Verstreken - bass (2018-2024)
- Jean-Pierre "Pierke" Dekeghel – guitars (1980–1981, died 2014)
- Luc Minne – vocals (1980–1982)
- Marnix "Bronco" van de Kauter – bass (1980–1986, 2002, 2010–2013, 2025 (touring member))
- Hans "Sphinx" van de Kerckhove – guitars (1980–1986, died 1989)
- Rudy "WhiteShark" Vercruysse – guitars (1980–1988, 2002, 2010–2014, died 2015)
- Marc "Red Star" de Brauwer – vocals (1982–1986, 2002, 2010–2011)
- Sylvain Cherotti – bass (1987–1988)
- Junao Martins – guitars (1987–1988, 2002)
- Chris Taerwe –keyboards (1987–1988)
- Peter De Wint – vocals (1987–1988, 2002)
- Josey Hindrix – vocals (2012–2026)
- Pierre Villafranca – bass (1986–1987)
- Geert Annys – guitars (2014-2016)
- Dario Frodo - guitars (2011-2017)
- Stripe - bass (2014-2017)
- Tom Tas - guitars (2016-2017)

== Discography ==
Studio albums

- Ecstasy and Danger (1984)
- Too Hot (1985)
- Feelings of Fury (1987)

EP

- Full Moon's Eyes (1983)
- Last Tribe Standing (2015)
