= Bill Metoyer =

American record producer

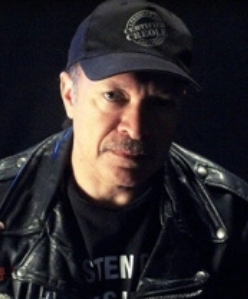

Background information
- Born: March 23, 1960 (age 66); Los Angeles, California, U.S.
- Genres: Heavy metal, rock
- Occupations: Composer, mastering engineer, mixing engineer, producer
- Label: Metal Blade
- Website: Bill Metoyer on Facebook

Bill Metoyer is an American record producer who has recorded with Slayer, Deliverance, Hirax, Morbid Angel, Trouble and Tourniquet. He has worked at Metal Blade Records for several years as house producer and currently works as A&R. He also works with Alpha Omega Management as A&R as well. Metoyer formed Skull Seven Productions.

== Background ==
Metoyer attended the University of Sound Arts in 1978 and then became the chief engineer at Track Record in 1979. Metoyer started his production career in 1983, recording bands like Slayer, Flotsam and Jetsam, Sacred Reich, D.R.I., Corrosion of Conformity, and Armored Saint.

Metoyer has worked with bands all of different styles, lyrical themes, some varying from Satanism to Christianity. In more recent days, Metoyer has worked with bands like Trouble and Hirax. Metoyer has been best known for his production of Slayer and Flotsam and Jetsam, however, he is also the creator of Skull Seven Productions in 1995 and works as an A&R for Alpha Omega Management as of 2016.

== Personal life ==
Metoyer is a Catholic.

== Discography ==
=== Performance ===
Artist	Album	Release date	Role
Ugly Americans	Philadelphia Freedom	1986	Vocals
Flotsam and Jetsam	No Place for Disgrace	1988	Vocals
Fates Warning	A Pleasant Shade of Gray	1997	Vocals
Sacred Steel	Wargods of Metal	1998	Vocals
Frost	Raise Your Fist to Metal	2003	Vocals
Dirty Rotten Imbeciles	But Wait, There's More	2016	Vocals

=== Production ===
==== 1980s ====
- Original Abattoir (Demo) – Abattoir (1983; engineering, producer)
- Screams from the Grave (Demo) – Abattoir (1983; engineering, producer)
- Armored Saint – Armored Saint (1983; engineering)
- Be My Slave – Bitch (1983; engineering)
- The Dominatress EP – Savage Grace (1983; engineering, mixing)
- Show No Mercy – Slayer (1983; engineering, mixing)
- Night on Bröcken – Fates Warning (1984; mixing)
- Give 'Em the Axe – Lizzy Borden (1984; Recording engineering)
- Battle Cry – Omen (1984; engineering)
- Metal Without Mercy – Ruthless (1984; Recording)
- Haunting the Chapel – Slayer (1984; engineering)
- Fist Held High – Thrust (1984; producer, engineering)
- Trouble – Trouble (1984; producer, engineering)
- Day of the Saxons (EP) – Witchkiller (1984; mixing)
- Animosity – Corrosion of Conformity (1985; engineering [tracks 1–5])
- We Have Arrived – Dark Angel (1985; engineering)
- The Spectre Within – Fates Warning (1985; engineering)
- Raging Violence – Hirax (1985; engineering)
- You Axed for It! – Mentors (1985; engineering)
- Warning of Danger – Omen (1985; engineering)
- Hole in the Sky – Pandemonium (1985; engineering)
- Hell Awaits – Slayer (1985; engineering, Recording)
- The Skull – Trouble (1985; producer, engineering)
- Legions of the Dead – Tyrant (1985; mixing, engineering, producer)
- One Foot in Hell – Cirith Ungol (1986; producer)
- Convicted – Cryptic Slaughter (1986; engineering)
- Merciless Death – Dark Angel (1986; engineering)
- Awaken the Guardian – Fates Warning (1986; engineering)
- Doomsday for the Deceiver – Flotsam and Jetsam (1986; engineering)
- Torture Knows No Boundaries – Heretic (1986; producer, engineering)
- Hate, Fear, and Power – Hirax (1986; engineering)
- The Murderess Metal Road Show – Lizzy Borden (1986; engineering)
- Up the Dose – Mentors (1986; engineering)
- The Curse – Omen (1986; producer, engineering, mixing)
- Depths of Death – Sentinel Beast (1986; engineering, producer)
- The Bitch is Back – Bitch (1987; producer, engineering, mixing)
- The High n' Mighty – Commander (1987; mixing, engineering)
- Money Talks – Cryptic Slaughter (1987; engineering, producer, mixing)
- Crossover – D.R.I. (1987; producer, mixing, engineering)
- Flotzilla" – Flotsam and Jetsam (1987; engineering)
- Not Dead Yet – Hirax (1987; engineering)
- Nightmares – Omen (1987; engineering)
- Ignorance – Sacred Reich (1987; producer, engineering)
- Too Late to Pray – Tyrant (1987; engineering, producer, mixing)
- Saints Will Conquer – Armored Saint (1988; engineering, producer)
- Socialized Hate – Atrophy (1988; producer)
- Stream of Consciousness – Cryptic Slaughter (1988; producer)
- 4 of a Kind – D.R.I. (1988; producer, mixing, engineering)
- Live at the Ritz – D.R.I. (1988; mixing)
- The Can – Dark Angel (1988; engineering)
- Wreckage in Flesh – Dr. Know (1988; engineering Assistant)
- "Saturday Night's Alright for Fighting" – Flotsam and Jetsam (1988; producer, engineering)
- No Place for Disgrace – Flotsam and Jetsam (1988; producer; engineering)
- Gangland – Gangland (1988; producer)
- A Distant Thunder – Helstar (1988; producer, engineering, mixing)
- Breaking Point – Heretic (1988; producer, engineering)
- The Kill – Pandemonium (1988; producer, engineering)
- "War Pigs" – Sacred Reich (1988; producer)
- Surf Nicaragua – Sacred Reich (1988; producer)
- Marshall Law / Day of the Saxons – Witchkiller/Obsession (1988; mixing)
- A Rose By Any Other Name – Bitch (1989; mixing, remixing, producer, engineering)
- Thrash Zone – D.R.I. (1989; producer, engineering, mixing)
- Deliverance – Deliverance (1989; Recording, producer, mixing)
- Hot Metal Summer II Split – Deliverance (1989; producer, Recording, mixing)
- Nosferatu – Helstar (1989; producer, engineering)
- Leatherface – Laaz Rockit (1989; producer)
- Sex, Drugs & Rock 'n' Roll – Mentors (1989; engineering)
- Up the Dose / You Axed for It – Mentors (1989; producer)
- The Best of Omens: Teeth of the Hydra – Omens (1989; engineering)
- Freaks EP – Rigor Mortis (1989; producer, engineering)
- Inner Ascendance – Steel Prophet (1989; mixing)
- Man of Straw – Viking (1989; engineering)

==== 1990s ====
- Puppies and Friends – Atrophy (1990; producer, engineering, mixing)
- Violent By Nature – Atrophy (1990; producer, engineering, mixing)
- Bomber – Ken Baumgartner (1990; producer, engineering)
- Weapons of Our Warfare – Deliverance (1990; mixing)
- The American Way – Sacred Reich (1990; producer, engineering)
- 31 Flavors – Sacred Reich (1990; producer, engineering)
- Uncensored – Sacred Reich (1990; producer)
- The American Way – Sacred Reich (1990; producer, engineering)
- Stop the Bleeding – Tourniquet (1990; mixing, Mastering)
- WWIII – WWIII (1990; producer)
- Psycho Savant - Intruder (1991; producer, engineering, mixing)
- Abominations of Desolation - Morbid Angel (1991; producer)
- A Question - Sacred Reich (1991; producer, engineering)
- Psycho Surgery - Tourniquet (1991; producer, engineering, mixing)
- Technocracy - Corrosion of Conformity (1992; engineering, mixing)
- Songs of Pain - Sadus (1992; engineering, Recording, producer, mixing [track 3])
- A Vision of Misery - Sadus (1992; engineering, mixing, producer, mixing)
- Planetary Destruction - Stygian (1992; producer)
- Pathogenic Ocular Dissonance - Tourniquet (1992; producer, engineering, mixing)
- Screams and Whispers - Anacrusis (1993; Remix [on "Release"])
- The Passing - Betrayal (1993; engineering, Tracking)
- First Impressions - Jim Matheos (1993; producer, engineering, mixing)
- Brimstone And Fire - D.Z. STANZ (1994; producer, engineer)
- The Man with the Action Hair - Cement (1994; producer, recording)
- Pale Fire - Fates Warning (1994; producer, recording)
- Inside Out - Fates Warning (1994; producer, recording)
- Decadent Delirium - Psychic Pawn (1994; recording, mixing, producer)
- Red Demo - Sadus (1994; recording)
- Coma Rage - Viper (1994; producer)
- Camelot in Smithereens - Deliverance (1995; mixing)
- The Prayer - Step Child (1995; producer)
- Demo 95 - The Militants (1995; producer)
- Demo 1995 - World in Pain (1995; producer, engineering, mixing)
- Terror Rising / Give 'em the Axe - Lizzy Borden (1996; engineering)
- Heal - Sacred Reich (1996; producer, engineering, mixing)
- Alive and Dead - Six Feet Under (1996; producer, engineering, mixing)
- Shadow of Doubt - Skrew (1996; mixing)
- King of Kings - Tyrant (1996; producer, mixing, engineering)
- Scorched Earth - Wardog (1996; mixing, producer)
- Valraven - Valraven (1996; producer)
- High - Flotsam and Jetsam (1997; Mixing, Recording)
- Through the Make Believe - New Eden (1997; Mixing)
- Still Ignorant (1987-1997) - Sacred Reich (1997; Mixing)
- Warpath - Six Feet Under (1997; Engineer)
- Angel Seed XXIII - Skrew (1997; Producer, Engineering, Mixing)
- Crawl to China - Tourniquet (1997; Engineering, Mixing, Producer)
- Breathe Deep the Dark - Destiny's End (1998; Producer, Engineering, Mixing)
- Diet of Worms - Echo Hollow (1998; Producer, Engineering, Mixing)
- Still Life - Fates Warning (1998; Recording engineer)
- Wargods of Metal - Sacred Steel (1998; Producer, Engineering, Mixing)
- Acoustic Archives - Tourniquet (1998; Producer)
- Away with Words - Jim Matheos (1999; Drum and Violin Engineering)
- Helldarado Promo - W.A.S.P. (1999; Engineering)
- Helldorado - W.A.S.P. (1999; Engineering)
- Engine - Engine (1999; Mixing)

==== 2000s ====
- Revelation - Armored Saint (2000; Mixing)
- Genesis - Steel Prophet (2000; Engineering, Mixing)
- Microscopic View of a Telescopic Realm - Tourniquet (2000; Producer)
- Transition - Destiny's End (2001; Assistant Engineering)
- My God - Flotsam and Jetsam (2001; Producer, Mixing, Recording)
- Burning Vengeance - Infamy (2001; Mastering)
- Metal Blade Demos - Vehemence (2001; Supervising)
- Unholy Terror - W.A.S.P. (2001; Engineering)
- Front Toward Enemy - The Fallen (2002; Producer, Engineering)
- Dying for the World - W.A.S.P. (2002; Engineering, Mixing, Producer)
- Redemption - Redemption (2003; Drum Engineering)
- Where Moth and Rust Destroy - Tourniquet (2003; Producer)
- Humanure - Cattle Decapitation (2004; Producer, Mixing, Engineering)
- Windrider - Axehammer (2005; Recording)
- Live in Athens - Fates Warning (2005; Mixing, Recording)
- Pussycat - The Charms (2005; Mixing)
- Over the Top - Mentors (2005; Recording, Mixing)
- The Fullness of Time - Redemption (2005; Drum Engineering)
- Metamorphosis - Killing Machine (2005; Engineering, Mixing, Producer)
- Diabolical Indignation (demo) - Damcyan (2006; Recording)
- Blood & Dirt - Vio-lence (2006; Engineering)
- Alienigma - Agent Steel (2007; Producer, Engineering, Mixing)
- Sins of the Past - Helstar (2007; Mastering, Engineering, Mixing, Producer)
- Death Rituals - Six Feet Under (2008; Drum Tracking Assistant)
- War Without End - Warbringer (2008; Mixing, Producer, Mastering, Recording)
- Annihilation Absolute - Cities (2009; Remastering)
- The Stars of Never Seen - Crescent-Shield (2009; Mixing, Mastering)
- Sub Atris Caelis - Infinitum Obscure (2009; Recording, Mixing)
- Blood Portraits - Nihlist (2009; Mixing, Mastering)
- ’’WORLDVIEW’’ - The Chosen Few (2016 Mixing Engineer) M24 Music Group
