= List of Omen band members =

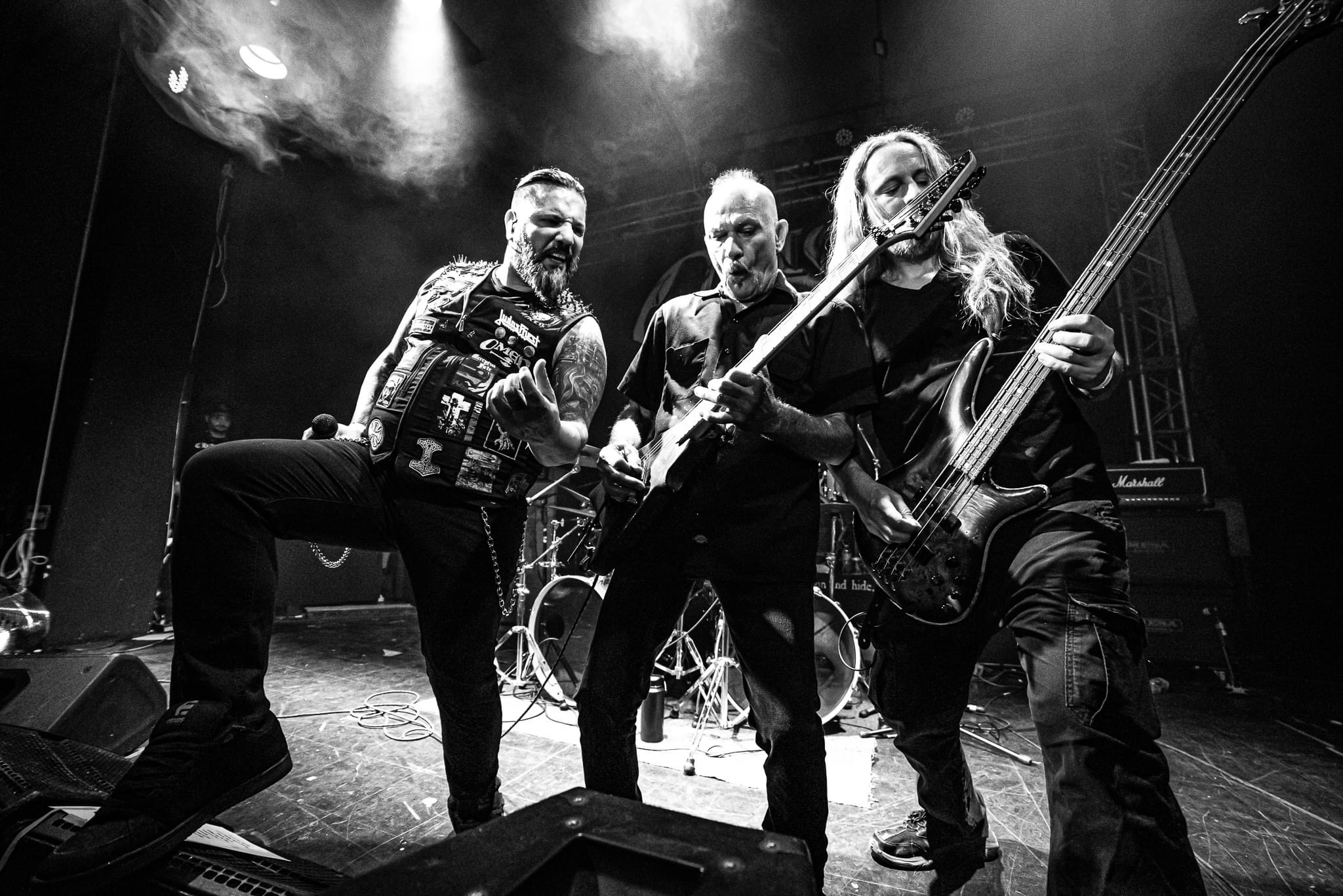
Omen performing live in 2024.

Omen is an American heavy metal band from Los Angeles, California. Formed in 1984, the group originally consisted of lead vocalist J. D. Kimball, guitarist Kenny Powell, bassist Jody Henry and drummer Steve Wittig. Powell is the only remaining original member of the band, which now features drummer Reece Stanley, vocalist Nikos Migus Antonogiannakis (both since 2017) and bassist Justin Riddler (since 2022).

== History ==
Following his departure from Savage Grace, guitarist Kenny Powell formed Omen in March 1984 with lead vocalist J. D. Kimball, bassist Jody Henry and drummer Steve Wittig. The band signed with Metal Blade Records and released their debut album Battle Cry that September. After subsequent releases Warning of Danger, The Curse and Nightmares, Kimball was fired in March 1987 due to ongoing problems with alcohol abuse, which had resulted in several instances of "unpredictable and violent" behavior including damaging a locker room at a show and starting fights with other band members. He was replaced by Coburn Pharr. The new lineup recorded Escape to Nowhere in the summer of 1988, but Wittig was replaced by Cam Daigneault before its release, as according to Powell he "was at the point in his life where he was wanting to settle down and have kids and stuff". After touring in promotion of Escape to Nowhere into 1989, Omen broke up and Powell moved away.

Powell reformed Omen in 1996 with his son Greg on vocals and guitar, Andy Haas on bass, and Rick Murray on drums. By 1998, Greg Powell had been replaced by Kevin Goocher. The new lineup released Eternal Black Dawn in September 2003. In 2004, Omen was put on temporary hiatus as Goocher and Powell formed Phantom-X with bassist Glenn Malicki and drummer Danny White. When the band returned in August 2006, both Malicki and White had joined the lineup. By March 2008, the lineup had changed entirely to feature Matt Story on vocals, Scott Clute on bass and original member Steve Wittig back on drums. Due to "passport issues", however, Story's place was quickly taken by ASKA frontman George Call. By March 2009, Danny White had returned to replace the outgoing Wittig. For a short South American tour in the summer, Call and White were replaced by Dantesco members Erico Morales and Wampa Zayas, respectively, before returning for later shows in Europe.

By the end of 2009, Andy Haas had returned to replace Clute. The new lineup released one song, "Blood on the Water", which was featured on the 2010 compilation Blood, Steel, Vengeance. In December 2010, Omen announced the permanent departures of George Call and Danny White, who were replaced by Matt Story and Wampa Zayas, respectively. By early 2012, Wittig had returned for a third tenure, replacing Zayas. Two years later, Kevin Goocher returned to the band, replacing Story. After Story's departure, Kenny Powell recorded the entirety of the next Omen album by himself (he claimed there was "no money to fly [Wittig] out" to play drums and Haas was taking care of his children after the death of his wife), with Goocher adding vocals after his arrival.

In February 2017, Powell and Goocher unveiled a new lineup of Omen including bassist Roger Sisson and drummer Reece Stanley. After releasing the song "Up from the Deep", Goocher left Omen for a second time in June 2017, blaming "internal differences". He was replaced in October by Greek vocalist Nikos Migus Antonogiannakis. The new lineup released the single "Alive" in 2018. In August 2022, the band announced the replacement of Sisson by Justin Riddler. Coburn Pharr stood in for two shows that year when Antonogiannakis was unable to perform due to illness, marking his last appearance with the band before his death in 2025.

== Members ==
=== Current ===
Name	Years active	Instruments	Release contributions
Kenny Powell	1984–1989; 1996–present	guitar; backing vocals	all Omen releases
Reece Stanley	2017–present	drums	"Up from the Deep" (2017); "Alive" (2018)
Nikos Migus Antonogiannakis	2017–present	lead vocals	"Alive" (2018)
Justin Riddler	2022–present	bass	none to date

=== Former ===
Name	Years active	Instruments	Release contributions
Jody Henry (1962–2025)	1984–1989	bass; backing vocals	all Omen releases from Battle Cry (1984) to Escape to Nowhere (1988); Live at the Country Club, Los Angeles, September 1984 (from the Omen box set, 2003); Into the Arena: 20 Years Live (2008)
Steve Wittig	1984–1988; 2008–2009; 2012–2017	drums	all Omen releases from Battle Cry (1984) to Escape to Nowhere (1988); Live at the Country Club, Los Angeles, September 1984 (from the Omen box set, 2003); Into the Arena: 20 Years Live (2008)
John "J. D." Kimball (1958–2003)	1984–1987	lead vocals	Battle Cry (1984); Warning of Danger (1985); The Curse (1986); Nightmares (1987); Live at the Country Club, Los Angeles, September 1984 (from the Omen box set, 2003); Into the Arena: 20 Years Live (2008)
Coburn Pharr (1962–2025)	1987–1989; 2022 (stand-in)	lead vocals	Escape to Nowhere (1988)
Cam Daigneault	1988–1989	drums	none
Andy Haas	1996–2004; 2009–2017	bass	Reopening the Gates (1997); Eternal Black Dawn (2003); "Blood on the Water" (2010)
Rick Murray	1996–2004	drums	Reopening the Gates (1997); Eternal Black Dawn (2003)
Greg Powell	1996–1998	lead vocals; guitar	Reopening the Gates (1997)
Kevin Goocher	1998–2008; 2014–2017	lead vocals	Eternal Black Dawn (2003); Hammer Damage (2016); "Up from the Deep" (2017)
Danny White	2006–2008; 2009–2010	drums	"Blood on the Water" (2010)
Glenn Malicki	2006–2008	bass	none
Scott Clute	2008–2009	bass	none
Matt Story	2008; 2010–2014	lead vocals	none
George Call	2008–2010	lead vocals	"Blood on the Water" (2010)
Wampa Zayas	2009 (stand-in); 2010–2012	drums	none
Roger Sisson	2017–2022	bass	"Up from the Deep" (2017); "Alive" (2018)

=== Stand-in ===
Name	Years active	Instruments	Details
Erico "La Bestia" Morales (1969–2021)	2009 (touring)	lead vocals	Morales and Wampa Zayas filled in for George Call and Danny White, respectively, for South American shows in summer 2009.

== Lineups ==
Period	Members	Releases
March 1984–March 1987	J. D. Kimball — lead vocals; Kenny Powell — guitar, backing vocals; Jody Henry — bass, backing vocals; Steve Wittig — drums	Battle Cry (1984); Warning of Danger (1985); The Curse (1986); Nightmares (1987); Live at the Country Club, Los Angeles, September 1984 (2003)
April 1987–summer 1988	Coburn Pharr — lead vocals; Kenny Powell — guitar, backing vocals; Jody Henry — bass, backing vocals; Steve Wittig — drums	Escape to Nowhere (1988)
Summer 1988–1989	Coburn Pharr — lead vocals; Kenny Powell — guitar, backing vocals; Jody Henry — bass, backing vocals; Cam Daigneault — drums	none
Band inactive 1990–1995
1996–1998	Greg Powell — lead vocals, guitar; Kenny Powell — guitar, backing vocals; Andy Haas — bass; Rick Murray — drums	Reopening the Gates (1997)
1998–2004	Kevin Goocher — lead vocals; Kenny Powell — guitar, backing vocals; Andy Haas — bass; Rick Murray — drums	Eternal Black Dawn (2003)
Band on hiatus 2004–2006
August 2006–March 2008	Kevin Goocher — lead vocals; Kenny Powell — guitar, backing vocals; Glenn Malicki — bass; Danny White — drums	none
March 2008	Matt Story — lead vocals; Kenny Powell — guitar, backing vocals; Scott Clute — bass; Steve Wittig — drums	none
March 2008–March 2009	George Call — lead vocals; Kenny Powell — guitar, backing vocals; Scott Clute — bass; Steve Wittig — drums	none
March–December 2009	George Call — lead vocals; Kenny Powell — guitar, backing vocals; Scott Clute — bass; Danny White — drums	none
December 2009–December 2010	George Call — lead vocals; Kenny Powell — guitar, backing vocals; Andy Haas — bass; Danny White — drums	"Blood on the Water" (2010)
December 2010–early 2012	Matt Story — lead vocals; Kenny Powell — guitar, backing vocals; Andy Haas — bass; Wampa Zayas — drums	none
Early 2012–October 2014	Matt Story — lead vocals; Kenny Powell — guitar, backing vocals; Andy Haas — bass; Steve Wittig — drums	none
October 2014–February 2017	Kevin Goocher — lead vocals; Kenny Powell — guitar, backing vocals; Andy Haas — bass; Steve Wittig — drums	Hammer Damage (2016) — features Kevin Goocher and Kenny Powell only
February–June 2017	Kevin Goocher — lead vocals; Kenny Powell — guitar, backing vocals; Roger Sisson — bass; Reece Stanley — drums	"Up from the Deep" (2017)
October 2017–August 2022	Nikos Migus A. — lead vocals; Kenny Powell — guitar, backing vocals; Roger Sisson — bass; Reece Stanley — drums	"Alive" (2018)
August 2022–present	Nikos Migus A. — lead vocals; Kenny Powell — guitar, backing vocals; Justin Riddler — bass; Reece Stanley — drums	none to date
