= Betsy (disambiguation) =

Betsy is a feminine given name.

Betsy may also refer to:

== Places in the United States ==
- Betsy Branch, a stream in Missouri
- Betsy Hollow, a valley in Missouri
- Betsy Lake (Luce County, Michigan)

== Music ==
- Betsy, a band name used by Bitch (band) for one album in 1988
- Betsy (Welsh singer) (2000), Welsh singer
- Betsy (Russian singer), Russian singer and blogger
- Betsy, solo name of Betsy Weiss, lead singer of Bitch (band)
- Betsy, solo name of Betsy Smittle, half-sister of Garth Brooks
- Betsy (Bitch album), 1988
- Betsy (Betsy album), 2017

== Other uses ==
- Kevin Betsy (born 1978), English football coach and former player
- The Betsy, a novel by Harold Robbins
- The Betsy, a 1978 film by Daniel Petrie based on the novel
- Tropical Storm Betsy (disambiguation), various hurricanes and tropical cyclones

== See also ==
- Big Betsy River and Little Betsy River, both in Michigan
- Betsey (disambiguation)
