= Teeth of the Hydra =

Teeth Of The Hydra

Compilation album by Omen
- Released: November 1989
- Recorded: 1984–1988
- Genre: Heavy metal
- Length: 46:14
- Label: Metal Blade (US); Roadrunner (Europe)
- Producer: Various

Omen compilations chronology
Teeth Of The Hydra (1989)	Battle Anthems (1998)

Professional ratings
Review scores
Source	Rating
AllMusic	4/5 stars
Metal Crypt	4/5 stars

The Best of Omen: Teeth of the Hydra is a compilation album by American heavy metal band Omen. It was originally released in 1989 by Metal Blade. The album compiles songs from all five Omen albums that had been released by 1989.

== Track listing ==
No.	Title	Writer(s)	Length
1.	"Holy Martyr"	Jody Henry, J.D. Kimball, Kenny Powell	4:03
2.	"Termination"	J.D. Kimball, Kenny Powell	3:32
3.	"Dragon's Breath"	Jody Henry, J.D. Kimball, Kenny Powell	2:59
4.	"Teeth of the Hydra"	Jody Henry, J.D. Kimball, Kenny Powell	5:59
5.	"Battle Cry"	J.D. Kimball, Kenny Powell	3:43
6.	"The Curse"	Jody Henry, J.D. Kimball, Kenny Powell	5:46
7.	"Nightmares"	Jody Henry, Seth Justman, J.D. Kimball, Kenny Powell, Peter Wolf	2:51
8.	"Boundy Hunter"	Jody Henry, J.D. Kimball, Kenny Powell	4:25
9.	"Thorn in Your Flesh"	Jody Henry, J.D. Kimball, Coburn Pharr, Kenny Powell	4:06
10.	"Die by the Blade"	Jody Henry, J.D. Kimball, Kenny Powell	3:10
11.	"Hell's Gates"	Jody Henry, J.D. Kimball, Kenny Powell	5:40

- Tracks 3, 5, 10 from Battle Cry (1984)
- Tracks 2, 11 from Warning of Danger (1985)
- Tracks 1, 4, 6, 8 from The Curse (1986)
- Track 7 from Nightmares (1987)
- Track 9 from Escape to Nowhere (1988)

== Personnel ==
Omen

- J.D. Kimball - vocals except "Thorn in Your Flesh"
- Kenny Powell - guitars
- Steve Wittig - drums
- Jody Henry - bass
- Coburn Pharr - vocals on "Thorn in Your Flesh"
