= The American Way (album) =

Studio album by Sacred Reich
- Released: May 15, 1990
- Recorded: 1989–1990
- Studio: Cornerstone Recorders; Track Records (additional)
- Genre: Thrash metal
- Length: 35:45
- Label: Metal Blade
- Producer: Bill Metoyer, Sacred Reich

Sacred Reich chronology
Alive at the Dynamo (1989)	The American Way (1990)	A Question (1991)

Sacred Reich studio album chronology
Ignorance (1987)	The American Way (1990)	Independent (1993)

Professional ratings
Review scores
Source	Rating
AllMusic	4.5/5 stars
Select	3/5 stars

The American Way is the second studio album by American thrash metal band Sacred Reich, released on May 15, 1990, via Metal Blade Records. The album peaked at No. 153 on September 1, 1990, on the Billboard 200 charts, lasting for nine weeks.

== Overview ==
Although the band had maintained a record of at least one release per year since their debut, Ignorance, this was their first full-length album for three years and also the first to show a musical progression from the rougher sounding, punk-inspired thrash metal in their earlier material. The album features slower tracks in favor of a more diverse tempo and tone and makes less use of techniques like double bass pedals and shredding, while still retaining elements of punk and hardcore punk. The band had also become more experienced; Greg Hall's drumming improved and is particularly praised on the album, and the band's performance as a group had improved significantly; writer Damien Chaney described it as "a group in full possession of its means ... without any real individuality that would stifle the others." Phil Rind's vocal performance progressed with more confidence, clarity, and use of vocal range. The album has been described as having a dark and somber tone because its sociopolitical lyrics. Similar to previous releases, the lyrics and theme of the album focused heavily on political and social issues but progressed towards a personal direction. In the album's liner notes, Phil Rind explains the band's change in musical direction:

"Lyrically, I think it is a little more personal than either Ignorance or Surf Nicaragua. Although there are some political songs/overtones, we've tried to deal more with people than political systems. ... Musically, we've tried to expand our horizons without forgetting our roots. Some people will appreciate the changes. Others, let's just say, they'd be satisfied with 'Ignorance II'."

The band worked with producer Bill Metoyer, who previously worked with Flotsam and Jetsam, DRI, and Slayer. The album title was originally named "Crimes Against Humanity" after the fourth track but was changed to "The American Way".

The title track, "The American Way", expresses issues with American society. The fourth track, "Crimes Against Humanity", focuses on pollution and environmental destruction. "State of Emergency" is an anti-apartheid song. "Who's To Blame" is about blaming teenage suicide on rock music. The closing track, "31 Flavors", is a funk rock song, with lyrical themes of open-mindedness and musical variety; encouraging fans of metal to expand their musical scope. The song was chosen as the promotional song for radio play, despite being "unrepresentative" of the rest of the album.

== Track listing ==
All tracks are written by Phil Rind, except where noted.

Side A
No.	Title	Writer(s)	Length
1.	"Love... Hate"	Rind, Wiley Arnett	4:08
2.	"The American Way"	Rind, Arnett	3:41
3.	"The Way It Is"		4:58
4.	"Crimes Against Humanity"		6:17

Side B
No.	Title	Writer(s)	Length
5.	"State of Emergency"		6:20
6.	"Who's To Blame"		3:40
7.	"I Don't Know"		3:14
8.	"31 Flavors"	Rind, Arnett	3:27
Total length:			35:45

Remastered edition bonus tracks
No.	Title	Length
1.	"The American Way" (Pre-Production Demo)	3:29
2.	"Love...Hate" (Pre-Production Demo)	3:56
3.	"Crimes Against Humanity" (Pre-Production Demo)	5:35
4.	"State of Emergency" (Pre-Production Demo)	4:39
5.	"I Don't Know" (Pre-Production Demo)	2:55
6.	"31 Flavors" (Pre-Production Demo)	0:31
Total length:		56:51

== Credits ==
Adapted from the album's liner notes.

- Phil Rind – bass, vocals
- Wiley Arnett – lead guitar
- Jason Rainey – rhythm guitar
- Greg Hall – drums
- The Unity Horns – horns on "31 Flavors"
  - Tony Brewster – trumpet
  - Will Donato – saxophone
  - Tim Moynahan – trombone
- Recorded and mixed in 1989–1990 in California, U.S. at Cornerstone Recorders with additional recording at Track Records
- Produced by Bill Metoyer and Sacred Reich
- Engineered by Bill Metoyer
- Assistant engineered by Scott Campbell
- Artwork by Paul Stottler

== Charts ==
1990 chart performance for The American Way
Chart	Peak position
Dutch Albums (Album Top 100)	81
US Billboard 200	153

2021 chart performance for The American Way
Chart	Peak position
German Albums (Offizielle Top 100)	69
