= Bratan (disambiguation) =

Bratan is a given name and a surname.

Bratan may also refer to:

- Bratan, Sliven Province
- Bratan (volcano) – Three caldera lakes at the north of Bali island

== See also ==
- Bratana
