= Zicari =

Zicari is a surname. Notable people with the surname include:

- Matt Zane (born Matthew Zicari), American singer, musician, suspension artist, and author
- Robert D. Zicari (born 1974), American pornographer, entrepreneur, podcaster and wrestling promoter
