= Bratan =

Bratan is a given name and a surname. Notable persons with the name include:

- Alexandru Bratan (born 1977), weightlifter from Moldova
- Eugen Bratan (born 1981), Moldovan weightlifter
- Bratan Tsenov (born 1964), Bulgarian former wrestler

== See also ==
- Bratana
- Bratanov
