= Burning in Water, Drowning in Flame =

Burning in Water, Drowning in Flame may refer to:

- Burning in Water, Drowning in Flame (album), a 1992 album by Skrew
- "Burning in Water, Drowning in Flame" (Fear the Walking Dead), an episode of the television series Fear the Walking Dead

== See also ==
- Burning in Water ... Drowning in Flame, a 2012 album by Pitch Black Forecast
