= Damnation Alley (disambiguation) =

Damnation Alley may refer to:

- Damnation Alley, a 1967 science fiction short story by Roger Zelazny, expanded into a novel in 1969.
- "Damnation Alley", a song by Hawkwind from their June 1977 album Quark, Strangeness and Charm, based on the novel.
- Damnation Alley (film), a September 1977 film, directed by Jack Smight, loosely based on the novel by Roger Zelazny.
- Damnation Alley (album), a 1982 album by female-fronted heavy metal band Bitch.
