= Still Ignorant =

Live album by Sacred Reich
- Released: November 1997
- Venue: The Mason Jar (Phoenix, Arizona)
- Genre: Thrash metal
- Length: 53:48
- Label: Metal Blade
- Producer: Bill Metoyer, Sacred Reich

Sacred Reich chronology
Heal (1996)	Still Ignorant (1997)	Awakening (2019)

Professional ratings
Review scores
Source	Rating
AllMusic	3/5 stars
Chronicles of Chaos	7/10 stars

Still Ignorant is a live album by American thrash metal band Sacred Reich. It was released on November 11, 1997, via Metal Blade Records and follows the band's fourth studio album, Heal, the previous year.

The album sees the return of original drummer, Greg Hall, after an absence of six years; Dave McClain had left to join Machine Head. This was their last recording before their split in 2000 and reunion in 2006.

== Track listing ==
All tracks written by Phil Rind, unless stated otherwise.

1. "American Way" (Wiley Arnett, Rind) – 3:48
2. "Administrative Decisions" – 3:40
3. "One Nation" (Arnett, Rind) – 2:55
4. "Independent" – 3:51
5. "State of Emergency" – 5:35
6. "The Power of the Written Word" (Arnett, Rind) – 2:51
7. "Heal" – 3:48
8. "Blue Suit, Brown Shirt" – 2:37
9. "Who's to Blame?" – 3:44
10. "Violent Solutions" (Jason Rainey, Rind) – 4:36
11. "War Pigs" (Black Sabbath cover) – 7:03
12. "Death Squad" – 4:30
13. "Surf Nicaragua" – 4:49

== Credits ==
- Phil Rind – vocals, bass
- Wiley Arnett – lead guitar
- Jason Rainey – rhythm guitar
- Greg Hall – drums
- Recorded by Aaron Carey at The Mason Jar, Phoenix, Arizona, U.S.
- Produced and mixed by Bill Metoyer and Sacred Reich
- Mixed at Vintage Recorders, Phoenix, Arizona, U.S.
- Cover art by Paul Stottler
