= Heal (Sacred Reich album) =

Studio album by Sacred Reich
- Released: February 27, 1996
- Recorded: August–October 1995
- Genre: Groove metal; thrash metal
- Length: 33:05
- Label: Metal Blade
- Producer: Bill Metoyer, Sacred Reich

Sacred Reich chronology
Independent (1993)	Heal (1996)	Still Ignorant (1997)

Professional ratings
Review scores
Source	Rating
AllMusic	4/5 stars
Chronicles of Chaos	9/10 stars
Rock Hard	9/10 stars

Heal is the fourth studio album by American thrash metal band Sacred Reich, released February 27, 1996, via Metal Blade Records. It is the band's final full-length studio album to feature guitarist Jason Rainey, and was their last one for 23 years, until the release of Awakening in August 2019.

== Album cover ==
The album cover is taken from a photograph of a medical contraption by Max Augilera Hellweg, from his book titled The Sacred Heart; depicting a pair of hands dressed in medical gloves holding a machine appearing to be inserted into a human heart.

== Track listing ==
No.	Title	Writer(s)	Length
1.	"Blue Suit, Brown Shirt"	Phil Rind	2:27
2.	"Heal"	Phil Rind	3:43
3.	"Break Through"	Phil Rind, Wiley Arnett	3:38
4.	"Low"	Phil Rind	4:03
5.	"Don't"	Phil Rind	2:52
6.	"Jason's Idea" (Instrumental)	Jason Rainey	0:40
7.	"Ask Ed"	Phil Rind, Wiley Arnett	4:07
8.	"Who Do You Want to Be?" (Oingo Boingo cover)	Danny Elfman	2:23
9.	"Seen Through My Eyes"	Phil Rind	3:19
10.	"I Don't Care"	Phil Rind, Wiley Arnett	3:16
11.	"The Power of the Written Word"	Phil Rind, Wiley Arnett	2:37
12.	"Beef Bologna" (Fear cover, bonus track)	Lee Ving	1:39
Total length:			33:05

== Credits ==
- Phil Rind – vocals, bass
- Wiley Arnett – lead guitar
- Jason Rainey – rhythm guitar
- Dave McClain – drums
- Produced by Bill Metoyer and Sacred Reich
