= Society 1 =

American industrial metal band

- Origin: Los Angeles, California, U.S.
- Genre: Industrial metal
- Years active: 1999–present
- Labels: InZane, Earache, Crash, DSN
- Members: Matt Zane; Jimmy Minj; Erik Kluiber; Dagon Destroyer
- Past members: Alex Crescioni; Iorden Mitev; Maxxxwell Carlisle; Dirt Von Karloff; Devin Norris; Justin Reynolds; Jame Potter; Sin Quirin; Aleister; Adrian Ost; Paul Raven; Berzerk Kirk; Sik Rick; Eric Franklin; Ivan DePrume; Johnny Pilz; Zhenya Pro
- Website: www.society1music.com

Society 1 is an American industrial metal band formed in the 1990s in Los Angeles by lead singer Matt Zane. They have released four studio albums, a live album, a compilation album, and a spoken word poetry album by vocalist Zane. The band has also performed at several major festivals, including Download, where Zane broke several records by performing the entire set suspended from four meat hooks through his back. Zane has performed while suspended on several other occasions.

== Discography ==
=== Studio albums ===
- Slacker Jesus (InZane Records, 1999)
- Words as Carriers (InZane Records, 2002)
- Exit Through Fear (Earache Records, 2003)
- The Sound that Ends Creation (Earache Records, 2005)
- The Years of Spiritual Dissent (Crash Music, 2006)
- A Journey from Exile (2011)
- A Collection of Lies (Independent 2014)
- Rise from the Dead (DSN Music, 2017)
- Black Level Six (Sadist Messiah Records, 2022)

=== Live albums ===
- Live and Raw (InZane Records, 2008)

=== DVD videos ===
- Fearing the Exit (Earache Records, 2004)
- The Creation of Sound – packaged with 'The Sound That Ends Creation' (Earache Records, 2004)
- In Our Own Images – packaged with 'The Years of Spiritual Dissent' (Crash Music, 2006)

== Music videos ==
- "Nothing" – from Exit Through Fear
- "Hate" – from Exit Through Fear
- "All You Want" – from Exit Through Fear
- "It Isn't Me – from The Sound that Ends Creation
- "This Is The End" – from The Years of Spiritual Dissent
- "Scream Out Your Breath" – from A Journey from Exile
- "I Got You" – from A Journey from Exile
- "It's Yours Now" – from Rise from the Dead
- "I Can't Feel" – from Rise from the Dead
- "Can't Unsee" – lockdown challenge track created during the 2020 coronavirus pandemic
- "I Reach Through" – second lockdown challenge track created during the 2020 coronavirus pandemic
- "Sunglasses at Night" – the first music video to be filmed entirely on selfie sticks, created during the 2020 coronavirus pandemic lockdown
- "The Soul Searches" – acoustic

== Members ==
Current

- Matt "The Lord" Zane – vocals, programming, guitar (1999—present)
- Jimmy Minj – bass (2019—present)
- Erik Kluiber – guitar (2022—present)
- Dagon Destroyer – drums (2002–2003, 2022—present)

Former

- Dirt Von Karloff – bass, backing vocals (d. 2021)
- Maxxxwell Carlisle – guitar
- Iorden Mitev – drums
- Preston Nash - drums
- Devin Norris – guitar (1997–2001)
- Justin Reynolds – bass, backing vocals (1997–2001)
- James Adrian Cross – drums (1997–2001)
- Sin Quirin – keyboards (2000–2001), guitars (2001–2006)
- Ivan DePrume – drums (2001–2002)
- Aleister – bass (2003–2004)
- Adrian Ost – touring drummer (2003–2004)
- Paul Raven – bass on Exit Through Fear (2003) (d. 2007)
- Berzerk Kirk – drums (2005–2006)
- Sik Rick – drums (????–2010)
- Eric Franklin – guitar (2006–2010)
- Brian Jackson – guitar (2012–2013)
- Brett Pirozzi – bass (2012)
- Alex Crescioni – guitar (2015–2016)
- Johnny Pilz – guitar (2019—2020)
- Zhenya Pro – drums (2019—2020)
