= Matt Zane =

American film producer

- Born: Matthew Zicari
- Other name: "The Lord"
- Occupations: Singer, musician, suspension artist, author
- Known for: Society 1

Matt "The Lord" Zane (born Matthew Zicari) is an American singer, musician, suspension artist, and author.

== Biography ==
Zane's birth name is Matthew Zicari. After graduating from Musicians Institute of Technology for Guitar Performance, he attended Los Angeles Valley College for music.

Zane was briefly the lead singer of short-lived industrial rock project Lotus Rising with cellist Tina Guo and is currently the creative force behind Society 1.

Since 2008, Zane has held the record for longest body suspension, surpassing the previous holder Criss Angel.

== Discography ==
=== Solo ===
- Words as Carriers (InZane Records, 2002)

=== With Society 1 ===
- Slacker Jesus (InZane Records, 1999)
- Exit Through Fear (Earache Records, 2003)
- The Sound That Ends Creation (Earache Records, 2005)
- The Years of Spiritual Dissent (Crash Music, 2006)
- Live and Raw (InZane Records, 2008)
- A Journey from Exile (2011)
- A Collection of Lies (Independent 2014)
- Rise From The Dead (DSN Music, 2017)

=== Live Albums ===
- Guilty Gear XX In L.A. Vocal Edition - Keep Yourself Alive II (Vocals), Bloodstained Lineage (Vocals) (TEAM Entertainment, 2004)

=== Documentary ===
- Contrasting Views of People Living Within an Artistic Lifestyle (Evil Now, 2000)
- Everyone Dies - Rockstars Don't Count (InZane Records, 2025)

=== Video Magazines ===
- Loudtimes Volume 1–3 (Inzane Records, 1999),
- Backstage Pass 1–2 (Inzane Records, 1999–2004)

=== DVD ===
- Slacker Jesus Home Video (InZane Records)
- Fearing the Exit (Earache Records, 2004),
- The Creation of Sound (Earache Records, 2005),
- The Strangest Life I've Ever Known (independently released, 2006),
- In Our Own Images (Crash Music, 2006)

=== Television appearances ===
- Spread Entertainment – Himself (2 episodes, 2007–2008) a.k.a. Spread TV (US title)
  - Episode #2.15 (2008) TV episode – Himself
  - Episode #1.13 (2007) TV episode – Himself
- Revelation 666 (2006) (TV) (as Matt 'The Lord' Zane) – Himself
- X Rated: The Sex Tapes That Shocked the World (2006) (TV) (as Matt 'The Lord' Zane) – Himself – interviewee
- Dr. 90210* – Himself (1 episode, 2005)
- Buying the Fountain of Youth (2005) TV episode – Himself
- Society 1: Fearing the Exit (2005) (V) – Himself

== Videography ==
=== As director ===
- Static-X - "Hollow (Project Regeneration)" (2020, with Xer0)
- Static-X - "All These Years" (2020, with Xer0)
- Static-X - "Bring You Down (Project Regeneration)" (2020, with Xer0)
- Static-X - "Terrible Lie" (2023, with Xer0)
