= Dusted (Skrew album) =

Studio album by Skrew
- Released: May 5, 1994
- Recorded: Chicago Trax Recording, Chicago, Illinois
- Genre: Industrial metal
- Length: 42:29
- Label: Metal Blade
- Producer: Howie Beno, Jeff Newell

Skrew chronology
Burning in Water, Drowning in Flame (1991)	Dusted (1994)	Shadow of Doubt (1996)

Professional ratings
Review scores
Source	Rating
Allmusic	4/5 stars

Dusted is the second album by Skrew, released on May 5, 1994, through Metal Blade Records.

== Track listing ==
All tracks are written by Adam Grossman.

No.	Title	Length
1.	"In Tongues"	2:00
2.	"Seeded"	4:29
3.	"Picasso Trigger"	3:52
4.	"Albatross"	4:28
5.	"Jesus Skrew Superstar"	4:01
6.	"Skrew Saves"	3:41
7.	"Season for Whither"	3:35
8.	"Sour"	6:54
9.	"Mouthful of Dust"	5:33
10.	"Godsdog"	3:58

== Personnel ==
Skrew

- Clay Campbell – guitar
- Mark Dufour – drums
- Adam Grossman – vocals, guitar, programming
- Mike Robinson – guitar
- Jim Vollentine – keyboards, programming
- Brandon Workman – electric bass

Production and additional personnel

- Tom Baker – mastering
- Howie Beno – programming, production, engineering
- Brian Liesegang – programming
- Jeff Newell – programming, production, engineering
- Sir Real Graphics – cover art
