= Sacred Steel (band) =

German heavy metal band

Background information
- Origin: Ludwigsburg, Germany
- Genres: Power metal, heavy metal, speed metal
- Years active: 1996–present
- Labels: Metal Blade (1996–2002); Massacre (2002–present)
- Members: Gerrit Mutz; Jonas Khalil; Jens Sonnenberg; Kai Schindelar; Matthias Straub
- Past members: Jörg Michael Knittel; Oliver Großhans
- Website: sacredsteel.de

Sacred Steel is a German heavy metal band.

== History ==
Sacred Steel formed in the 80s when almost all of the members were already playing in bands that could gather underground acclaim. However, after forming Sacred Steel they were able to draw larger attention and success. After opening for bands like Blitzkrieg they were signed to Metal Blade Records in April 1997 being the first German band ever to do so. Their debut album Reborn in Steel was released October 1997 and with great press and fan response, Sacred Steel became one of the top German metal acts in a short time, maybe also due to the renaissance of true metal and successes of bands like HammerFall.

They released two more albums on Metal Blade: Wargods of Metal in 1998 (produced by Bill Metoyer of Slayer and Helstar fame) and Bloodlust in 2000. Bloodlust was a concept album that saw the band broaden their stylistic horizon but, remaining a committed true metal band.

They played many festivals in Europe, mostly underground ones but also the renowned Wacken Open Air twice and went on tour with many bands, e.g. Primal Fear and Children of Bodom.

After signing to Massacre Records they released their fourth album Slaughter Prophecy in 2002 which again saw the band playing around with a wide variety of influences that revealed the decades-long love of the musicians for all kinds of heavy metal. Some of the new songs even bordered on doom metal or death metal. The last album of the original lineup was Iron Blessings that was released with a big bang in October 2004 – that very release show has been turned into a live CD and DVD under the title Live Blessings (released 2006).

After a year-long hiatus Jörg Michael Knittel and Oliver Großhans, the two original guitarists, left Sacred Steel to pursue their death metal project My Darkest Hate. Jens Sonnenberg switched from bass guitar to guitar and two new members were quickly brought in: Kai Schindelar on bass guitar, the former guitar tech and roadie Jonas Khalil as additional guitarist.

2006 saw the release of the first album with the new lineup which had been recorded with Sodom producer Harris Johns. Hammer of Destruction was a 'back to the roots'-album for the band and had very strong songs that reminded of rather archetypical heavy metal bands like early Metallica, Iron Maiden, Jag Panzer, Megadeth or Helstar. It was again a success with fans and media and even spawned a video clip to "Maniacs of Speed".

== Musical style and aesthetic ==
Sacred Steel can be located somewhere between classic European true metal and heavier thrash or speed metal, but also draws many influences like fantasy metal or doom metal. They have, albeit, managed to create a distinct style from their first album, mostly due to the characteristic vocal performance of singer Gerrit P. Mutz. Their lyrics deal with typical genre topics like battles (especially visible on the concept album Bloodlust) or heavy metal in general and offer a light-hearted stance (e.g. the anthems "Sacred Steel" and "Sacred Bloody Steel").

== Members ==
Era	Lineup	Album(s)
1996–2005	Gerrit Mutz – Vocals; Jörg Michael Knittel – Guitar; Oliver Großans – Guitar; Jens Sonnenberg – Bass; Matthias Straub – Drums	Reborn in Steel (1997); Wargods of Metal (1998); Bloodlust (2000); Slaughter Prophecy (2002); Iron Blessings (2004)
2005–present	Gerrit Mutz – Vocals; Jonas Khalil – Guitar; Jens Sonnenberg – Guitar; Kai Schindelar – Bass; Matthias Straub – Drums	Hammer of Destruction (2006); Carnage Victory (2009); The Bloodshed Summoning (2013); Heavy Metal Sacrifice (2016)

== Selected discography ==
=== 1997 – Reborn in Steel ===
1. "Metal Reigns Supreme"
2. "Battle Angel"
3. "Trapped in Hell"
4. "True Force of Iron Glory"
5. "Reborn in Steel"
6. "Purified By Pain"
7. "Sword of the King
8. "In the Mouth of Madness"
9. "Kill the Deceiver"
10. "Sacred Steel"

=== 1998 – Wargods of Metal ===
1. "Blessed By the Gods"
2. "Wargods of Metal"
3. "Tonight the Witches Ride"
4. "Iron Legions"
5. "Carnage Rules the Fields of Death"
6. "Army of Metalheads"
7. "Battle Cry"
8. "Dethrone the Tyrant King"
9. "By Steel We Rule"
10. "Crusaders of the Metal Blade"
11. "Empire of Steel"
12. "Declaration of War"
13. "Heavy Metal to the End"

=== 2000 – Bloodlust ===
1. "Stormhammer"
2. "The Oath of Blood"
3. "By the Wrath of the Unborn"
4. "Blood on My Steel"
5. "Metal Is War"
6. "Journey to the City of the Dreaming Dead" (Vinyl bonus)
7. "Sacred Warriors of Steel"
8. "Dark Forces Lead Me to the Brimstone Gate"
9. "Master of Thy Fate"
10. "Lust for Blood"
11. "Throne of Metal"

=== 2002 – Slaughter Prophecy ===
1. "The Immortal Curse"
2. "Slaughter Prophecy" (Vengeance for the Dead)
3. "Sacred Bloody Steel"
4. "The Rites of Sacrifice"
5. "Raise the Metal Fist"
6. "Pagan Heart"
7. "Faces of the Antichrist"
8. "Lay Me to My Grave"
9. "Crush the Holy, Save the Damned" (Bonus track)
10. "Let the Witches Burn"
11. "Invocation of the Nameless Ones"

=== 2004 – Iron Blessings ===
1. "Open Wide the Gate"
2. "Your Darkest Saviour"
3. "Screams of the Tortured"
4. "At the Sabbat of the Possessed" (The Witches Ride Again)
5. "Beneath the Iron Hand"
6. "Anointed By Bloodshed"
7. "Victory of Black Steel"
8. "I Am the Conqueror" (Come and Worship Me)
9. "Crucified in Heaven"
10. "The Chains of the Nazarene"
11. "We Die Fighting"

=== 2006 – Live Blessings (Live-2CD+DVD) ===
1. "Blessed By the Gods" (Intro)
2. "Open Wide the Gate"
3. "Tonight the Witches Ride"
4. "Battle Angel"
5. "Faces of the Antichrist"
6. "Victory of Black Steel"
7. "Carnage Rules the Fields of Death"
8. "The Rites of Sacrifice"
9. "Dark Forces Lead Me to the Brimstone Gate"
10. "Sword of the King"
11. "Stormhammer"
12. "Metal Is War"
13. "Master of Thy Fate"
14. "True Force of Iron Glory"
15. "Sacred Bloody Steel"
16. "We Die Fighting"
17. "Blood on My Steel"
18. "Heavy Metal to the End"
19. "Slaughter Prophecy"
20. "Battle Cry"
21. "Wargods of Metal"

=== 2006 – Hammer of Destruction ===
1. "Hammer of Destruction"
2. "Where Demons Dare to Tread"
3. "Maniacs of Speed"
4. "Blood and Thunder"
5. "Impaled By Metal"
6. "Descent of a Lost Soul"
7. "Black Church"
8. "Generally Hostile" (Jag Panzer Cover)
9. "Plague of Terror"
10. "Sword and Axes"
11. "The Torch of Sin"

=== 2006 – Hammer of Destruction (Bonus CD) ===
1. "Pounding Inferno" (brand new song)
2. "Children of the Spirit" (brand new song)
3. "Hell Insanity" (brand new song)
4. "Unholy Majesty" (brand new song)
5. "A Curse Upon Your Name" (B-Side from "Open Wide the Gate", 7")
6. "Iron Blessing" (from "Split", 7" with Wizzard)
7. "Zombie Ritua"l (Death Coverversion, never officially released)
8. "All for One" (Raven Coverversion, brand new recording)
9. "Metal Knights" (Nasty Savage Coverversion, brand new recording)
10. "(Empty) Tankard" (Tankard Coverversion, brand new recording)

=== 2009 – Carnage Victory ===
1. "Charge into Overkill"
2. "Don't Break the Oath"
3. "Carnage Victory"
4. "Broken Rites"
5. "Crosses Stained with Blood"
6. "Ceremonial Magician of the Left Hand Path"
7. "The Skeleton Key"
8. "Shadows of Reprisal"
9. "Denial of Judas" (Heaven Betrayed)
10. "Metal Underground"
11. "By Vengeance and Hatred We Ride"

The bonus DVD contains a full concert of Queens of Metal 2009, a studio report and one live clip from Summer Breeze 2009 produced by Sacred Steel.

=== 2013 – The Bloodshed Summoning ===
1. "Storm of Fire 1916"
2. "No God / No Religion"
3. "When the Siren Calls"
4. "The Darkness of Angels"
5. "The Bloodshed Summoning"
6. "Under the Banner of Blasphemy"
7. "Black Towers"
8. "Crypts of the Fallen"
9. "The Night They Came to Kill"
10. "Join the Congregation"
11. "Journey into Purgatory"
12. "Doomed to Eternal Hell"
13. "Perversions of the Scriptures" (Bonus track)
14. "Unbinding the Chains" (Bonus track)
15. "Dig Up Her Bones" (Bonus track)

=== 2016 – Heavy Metal Sacrifice ===
1. "Intro (Glory Ride)"
2. "Heavy Metal Sacrifice"
3. "The Sign of the Skull"
4. "Hail the Godz of War"
5. "Vulture Priest"
6. "Children of the Sky"
7. "Let There Be Steel"
8. "Chaos Unleashed"
9. "The Dead Walk the Earth"
10. "Beyond the Gates of Nineveh"
11. "Iron Donkey"
