= Awakening (Sacred Reich album) =

Studio album by Sacred Reich
- Released: August 23, 2019
- Recorded: 2019
- Studios: The Platinum Underground, Mesa, Arizona
- Genres: Thrash metal; groove metal
- Length: 31:23
- Label: Metal Blade
- Producers: Arthur Rizk, Sacred Reich

Sacred Reich chronology
Still Ignorant (1997)	Awakening (2019)	Into the Abyss (2027)

Awakening is the fifth studio album by American thrash metal band Sacred Reich, released through Metal Blade Records on August 23, 2019. It is the band's first full-length studio album since Heal (1996), marking the longest gap between Sacred Reich's studio albums, as well as their first release with rhythm guitarist Joey Radziwill, who replaced founding member Jason Rainey shortly before the recording sessions began.

== Critical reception ==
Professional ratings
Aggregate scores
Source	Rating
Metacritic	76/100
Review scores
Source	Rating
AllMusic	3.5/5 stars
Exclaim!	7/10

Awakening was met with generally favorable reviews from critics. At Metacritic, which assigns a weighted average rating out of 100 to reviews from mainstream publications, this release received an average score of 76, based on four reviews.

== Track listing ==
All tracks are written by Phil Rind, except where noted.

No.	Title	Length
1.	"Awakening"	4:08
2.	"Divide & Conquer"	3:40
3.	"Salvation"	3:59
4.	"Manifest Reality"	4:44
5.	"Killing Machine"	3:18
6.	"Death Valley"	5:22
7.	"Revolution"	2:48
8.	"Something to Believe"	3:24
Total length:		31:23

Japanese edition bonus track
No.	Title	Length
9.	"Salvation" (Demo)	4:05
Total length:		35:33

== Personnel ==
- Phil Rind – bass, vocals
- Wiley Arnett – lead guitar
- Joey Radziwill – rhythm guitar
- Dave McClain – drums

Production

- Arthur Rizk – producer, mixing
- Maor Appelbaum – mastering
- John Aquillino – engineering, mixing
- Paul Stottler – cover art
- Brian Ames – layout
- Stephanie Cabral – photography

== Charts ==
Chart (2019)	Peak position
US Heatseekers Albums (Billboard)	1
US Independent Albums (Billboard)	9
US Top Album Sales (Billboard)	59
