= Be My Slave =

Studio album by Bitch
- Released: July 1983
- Recorded: May–June 1983
- Studios: Track Record Studios, Los Angeles
- Genre: Heavy metal
- Length: 49:08
- Label: Metal Blade / Enigma
- Producers: Phil Pecora, Brian Slagel

Bitch chronology
Damnation Alley (1982)	Be My Slave (1983)	The Bitch Is Back (1987)

Professional ratings
Review scores
Source	Rating
AllMusic	4/5 stars
Collector's Guide to Heavy Metal	6/10
Metal Forces	4/10

Be My Slave is a 1983 album by the American heavy metal band Bitch, released on the Metal Blade Records label under the genre "dominatrix metal". Be My Slave was cited by Tipper Gore, during the Parents Music Resource Center campaign against violent and sexually explicit content in the music industry and was held as an example in the hearing before the United States Senate Committee on Commerce, Science and Transportation on September 19, 1985. The album was re-issued in 1989 on a single CD with the EP Damnation Alley.

== Track listing ==
Side one
No.	Title	Lyrics	Music	Length
1.	"Right from the Start"	Betsy	David Carruth, Robby Settles	5:08
2.	"Be My Slave"	Betsy, Mark Webb	Webb, Carruth, Settles	4:40
3.	"Leatherbound"	Webb	Webb	4:19
4.	"Riding in Thunder"	Betsy, Carruth	Carruth	3:58
5.	"Save You from the World"	Betsy, Carruth	Carruth	5:41

Side two
No.	Title	Lyrics	Music	Length
6.	"Heavy Metal Breakdown"	Betsy	Carruth, Settles	5:34
7.	"Gimme a Kiss"	Betsy	Settles	3:54
8.	"In Heat"	Betsy	Settles	6:47
9.	"Make It Real (Make It Rock)"	Betsy	Carruth, Settles	3:57
10.	"World War III"	Betsy, Carruth	Carruth	5:10

== Personnel ==
=== Band members ===
- Betsy Bitch - lead vocals
- David Carruth - guitar
- Mark Anthony Webb - bass
- Robby Settles - drums

=== Production ===
- Phil Pecora - producer
- Bill Metoyer - engineer
- Brian Slagel - executive producer
