= Skrew =

American industrial metal band

SKREW

Background information
- Origin: Austin, Texas, U.S.
- Genres: Industrial metal; Thrash metal
- Years active: 1990–1998; 2009–present
- Label: Metal Blade Records
- Members: Adam Grossman; Ricktor Ravensbrück; Laurent Le Baut
- Past members: Danny Lohner; Mike Robinson; Clay Campbell; Bobby Gustafson; Barry Adelman; Mike Peoples; Brandon Workman; Robb Lampmann; Chris Ault; Mark Dufour; Chadwick Davis; Steve Green; Jason L. Eddie Travis; Steve Green; Marc Frappier; Jim Vollentine; Kyle Sanders; Chris Istas; Paul Gooch; Dusty Kohn; William Ables

Skrew is an American industrial metal band formed in 1990, disbanded in 1998, and reformed in 2009.

== Biography ==
Skrew was formed in 1990 in Austin, Texas, by Adam Grossman and Danny Lohner. The band emerged from the dissolution of crossover thrash band Angkor Wat, of which Grossman and Lohner were members. Skrew recruited Al Jourgensen of Ministry to record and produce its 1991 debut album, Burning in Water, Drowning in Flame. The album out-sold every debut on the Metal Blade catalog and received critical praise. During this period, Lohner left the band to audition for Red Hot Chili Peppers before joining Nine Inch Nails.

Skrew released its second album, Dusted, in 1994. The album featured keyboardist Jim Vollentine, who remained with the band until 1998. Like its predecessor, Dusted was praised by critics and fans, and is considered an industrial metal classic by many fans. Commercially, it was less successful than Burning in Water, Drowning in Flame.

The band's music changed, resulting in the 1996 album Shadow of Doubt. The album moved away from the band's previous sound, featuring a slow thrash metal sound similar to Machine Head. The band went through several member changes in the next year. By 1997, Grossman had a stable line-up and released the band's final album, Angel Seed XXIII, which featured a style even further from their original sound. The album received even less attention than its predecessor due to a lack of support from their label. Skrew went on hiatus in 1998.

In late 2009, Grossman began putting the pieces of Skrew back together again. The reformed band debuted on February 12, 2011, in Austin, Texas with a follow-up appearance in March 2011 at the SXSW music festival. The new material was much more politically oriented in terms of lyrics and musically might be more comparable to the Scandinavian extreme metal scene, all the while maintaining the roots of their distinctive sound.

In July 2014, Skrew digitally released Universal Immolation, their first album in 17 years. Worldwide touring commenced in 2015.

== Members ==
=== Current ===
- Adam Grossman – vocals, guitars, programming (1990–1998, 2009–present)
- Ricktor Ravensbrück – guitars (2014–present)
- Laurent Le Baut – drums (1990–1998, 2009–present)

=== Former ===
- Danny Lohner – guitars, vocals (1990–1993)
- Rick Weir – keyboards, programming (1990–1991)
- Tony Maingot – keyboards, programming (1990–1991)
- Dusty Kohn – guitar
- Bobby "Rock" Landgraf - guitars
- RiG̈G̈S - guitars
- Myke Bingham – bass
- Mike Robinson – guitars
- Clay Campbell – guitars
- Bobby Gustafson – guitars (1996)
- Mike Peoples – bass
- Brandon Workman – bass
- Robb Lampmann – guitars
- Chris Ault – keyboards, programming
- Mark Dufour – drums
- Chadwick Davis – bass
- Eddie Travis – drums
- Steve "Snake" Green – guitars
- Marc "Frap" Frappier – bass
- Jim Vollentine – keyboards, programming (1994–1998)
- Barry Adelman – drums
- Chris Istas – drums
- Kyle Sanders – bass
- Paul Gooch – programming
- Jason Lindgren – guitars
- William Ables – guitars
- Doug (Snide) Chapius – guitars
- Bret Munk - guitars
- Brian M. McCain - touring, guitars

== Discography ==
Studio albums

- Burning in Water, Drowning in Flame (1991, Metal Blade)
- Dusted (1994, Metal Blade)
- Shadow of Doubt (1996, Metal Blade)
- Angel Seed XXIII (1997, Metal Blade)
- Universal Immolation (2014, Awesome Kickass Records)
