= Angel Seed XXIII =

Studio album by Skrew
- Released: October 21, 1997
- Recorded: Village Recording Studios, Tornillo, Texas
- Genre: Industrial metal; nu metal
- Length: 44:36
- Label: Metal Blade
- Producer: Adam Grossman, Bill Metoyer, Jim Vollentine

Skrew chronology
Shadow of Doubt (1996)	Angel Seed XXIII (1997)	Universal Immolation (2014)

Professional ratings
Review scores
Source	Rating
Allmusic	1.5/5 stars

Angel Seed XXIII is the fourth studio album by the industrial metal band Skrew. It was released in 1997 through Metal Blade Records.

== Track listing ==
All lyrics are written by Adam Grossman; all music is composed by Adam Grossman and Jim Vollentine.

No.	Title	Length
1.	"Open Up"	4:13
2.	"Sea Man"	3:52
3.	"Seventh Eye"	4:35
4.	"King of the Hole"	3:26
5.	"Porcelain"	4:11
6.	"Kosmo's Seed"	3:32
7.	"Sputnik"	4:31
8.	"Angel Suck"	3:14
9.	"Horsey (Man)"	3:27
10.	"Slip"	5:12
11.	"Helter Skelter" (unlisted track, written by Lennon–McCartney)	6:01

== Personnel ==
Skrew

- Mark Frappier – bass guitar
- Adam Grossman – vocals, guitar, production, mixing, design
- Chris Istas – drums, percussion
- Jason Lindgren – guitar, vocals
- Jim Vollentine – percussion, vocals, programming, production, engineering, mixing, design

Production and additional personnel

- Barbara Arriaga – cello
- Tom Baker – mastering
- Doug C. – guitar
- H.A. Clough – piano
- Kathryn Kinslow – photography
- Mahrla Manning – bagpipes
- Bill Metoyer – production, engineering, mixing
