= Sacred Reich =

American thrash metal band

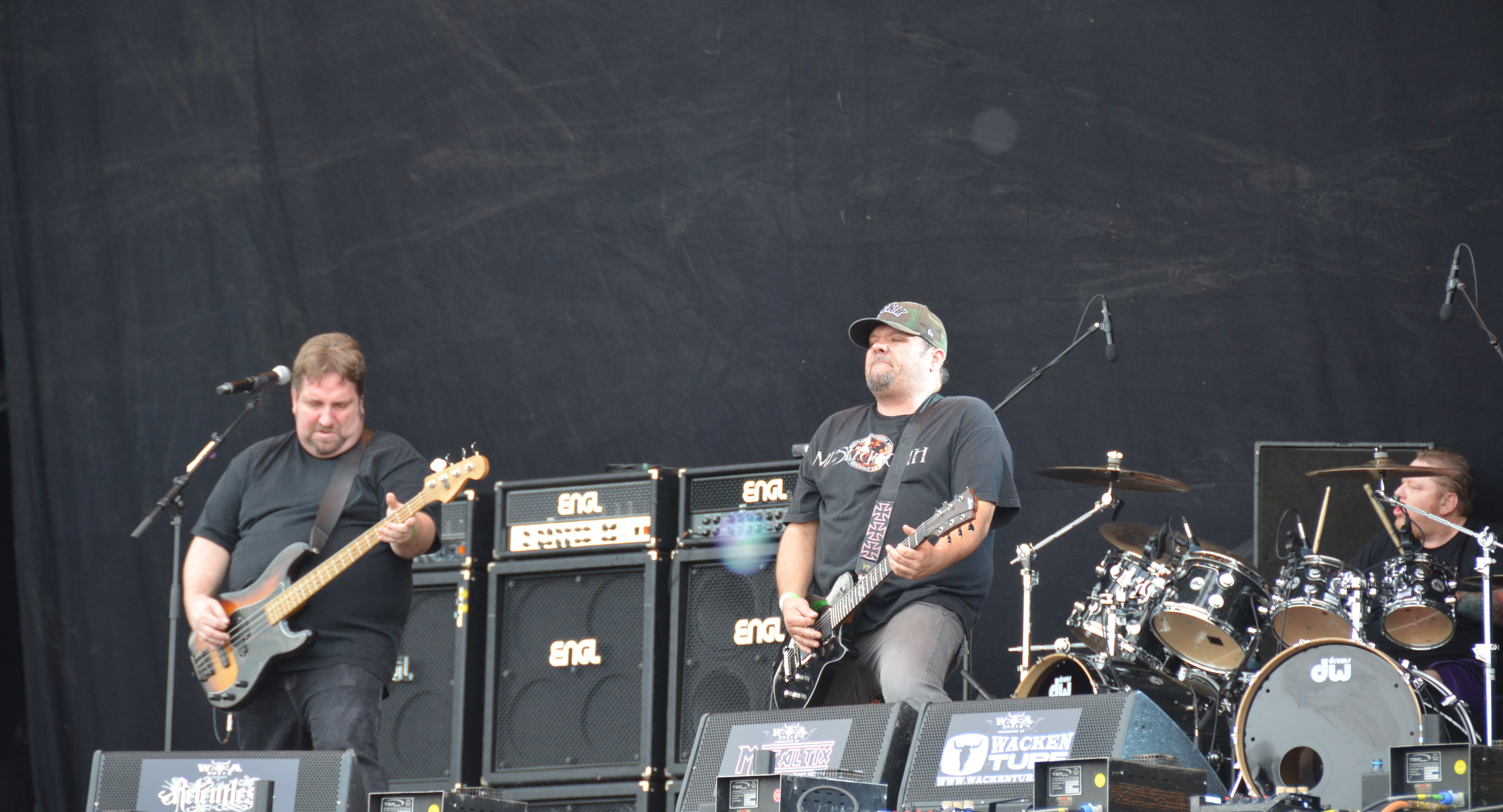
- Sacred Reich at Wacken Open Air in 2012

Background information
- Origin: Phoenix, Arizona, U.S.
- Genre: Thrash metal
- Years active: 1985–2000; 2006–present
- Labels: Metal Blade; Hollywood
- Members: Phil Rind; Wiley Arnett; Joey Radziwill; Eduardo Baldo
- Past members: Jason Rainey; Greg Hall; Jeff Martinek; Dan Kelly; Ray Nay; Mike Andre; Dave McClain
- Logo
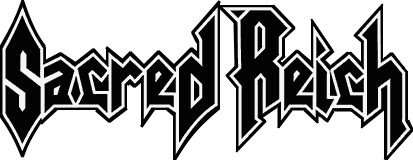

Sacred Reich is an American thrash metal band formed in Phoenix, Arizona, in 1985. As of 2025, the band's lineup has consisted of vocalist-bassist Phil Rind, lead guitarist Wiley Arnett, rhythm guitarist Joey Radziwill, and drummer Eduardo Baldo. Former members include rhythm guitarist Jason Rainey, and drummers Greg Hall and Dave McClain. Their music features mid-tempo song structures and influences from punk rock and hardcore punk. Their lyrics focus on politics and society. The band is credited (along with Testament, Destruction, Death Angel, and Dark Angel) with leading the late-1980s second wave of thrash metal.

Sacred Reich found success with the release of their debut album, Ignorance (1987), but remained relatively underground. After the release of their first EP, Surf Nicaragua (1988), and second album, The American Way (1990), which reached No. 153 on the Billboard 200 chart, the band gained acclaim. Their next two albums, Independent (1993) and Heal (1996), underperformed, leading to Sacred Reich disbanding in 2000. They reunited for a series of live shows in 2006, reforming as a live act. In 2018, they began recording their first album after their reformation, Awakening, released in August 2019.

== History ==
=== 1985–1989: Formation, early years, Ignorance, and Surf Nicaragua ===
Sacred Reich was formed at Coronado High School in Scottsdale, Arizona in 1985. The original lineup consisted of rhythm guitarist Jason Rainey, lead guitarist Jeff Martinek, bassist Mike Andre, vocalist Dan Kelly, and drummer Ray Nay. Soon after, Phil Rind replaced Andre as bassist and Greg Hall replaced Nay on drums. Rind took over vocals after Kelly became ill. After Draining You of Life's release later that year, (Note: The authors of Metal: The Definitive Guide and Camion Blanc: State of the Extreme Music Scene say that Draining You of Life was released in late 1985, while author Thierry Anzar says it was released in 1986.) Martinek left to join the military and the group replaced him with guitarist Wiley Arnett. With Arnett, they re-recorded the song "Sacred Reich" alongside a new song titled "Ignorance".

"Ignorance" (1987)
"Ignorance" (title track of Ignorance), demonstrating Sacred Reich's fast tempos and punk rock and hardcore punk-inspired musicianship during their early works

With support from former Flotsam and Jetsam and then-Metallica bassist Jason Newsted, "Ignorance" was included on the Metal Blade Records compilation Metal Massacre VIII (1987), which brought the band outside attention. Metal Blade signed them to a record deal and released their debut album, Ignorance, in October of that year. Ignorance was influenced by punk rock and hardcore punk, and featured political and social commentary in their lyrics,using themes of war, racism, and political oppression, among others. Ignorance was generally well received, with reviews citing its political themes and lyrics. Hit Parader said, "intelligence and metal are two things not normally associated with each other, but in the case of Sacred Reich, they blend to form a powerful musical message." Kerrang! labeled the album the "best debut thrash LP this year." The band members received offers from other bands, including Flotsam and Jetsam, Dark Angel, and Slayer.

In 1988, Sacred Reich released the EP Surf Nicaragua, which was more crossover-oriented than previous releases, and featured better production and slower tempos while the group grew as musicians. The album's success pushed Sacred Reich into the world market and the band began a world tour, including an appearance at Dynamo Open Air in 1989, which was recorded and released as their first live album, Alive at the Dynamo.

=== 1990–2000: The American Way, Independent, Heal, and disbanding ===
"The American Way" (1990)
"The American Way" (title track of The American Way), where the band moved away from fast tempos and punk influence for more diverse tempos and tone

In 1990, Sacred Reich released their second album, The American Way. The album saw Sacred Reich progress further from their debut Ignorance, featuring less use of double bass pedals and shredding and favoring slower tracks for more diverse tempos and tone. The album peaked at No. 153 on the Billboard 200 chart on September 1, 1990, staying on the chart for nine weeks. Sacred Reich toured for nearly two years in support of The American Way, including co-headlining with Sepultura and Napalm Death on the New Titans on the Bloc tour in 1991. In 1991, the band released an EP titled A Question. Later that year, Greg Hall parted ways with Sacred Reich and was replaced by former S.A. Slayer member Dave McClain.

Sacred Reich signed with major record label Hollywood Records and released their third album, Independent, in 1993. On the album, they continued experimenting with groove metal. The album received little recognition upon release stemming from the drop in popularity of thrash metal and the gap between album releases. Dave McClain departed Sacred Reich to join Machine Head after receiving several offers from them earlier that year. Their fourth album, Heal (1996), received little to no recognition for similar reasons to their previous album Independent. Later that year, Greg Hall rejoined the band, but drummer Chuck Fitzgerald took over drumming duties for the world tour. The band released a live album, Still Ignorant, in 1997, but remained relatively inactive outside of touring. The band disbanded between 1999 and 2000.

=== 2006–present: Reformation, Awakening, and Into the Abyss ===
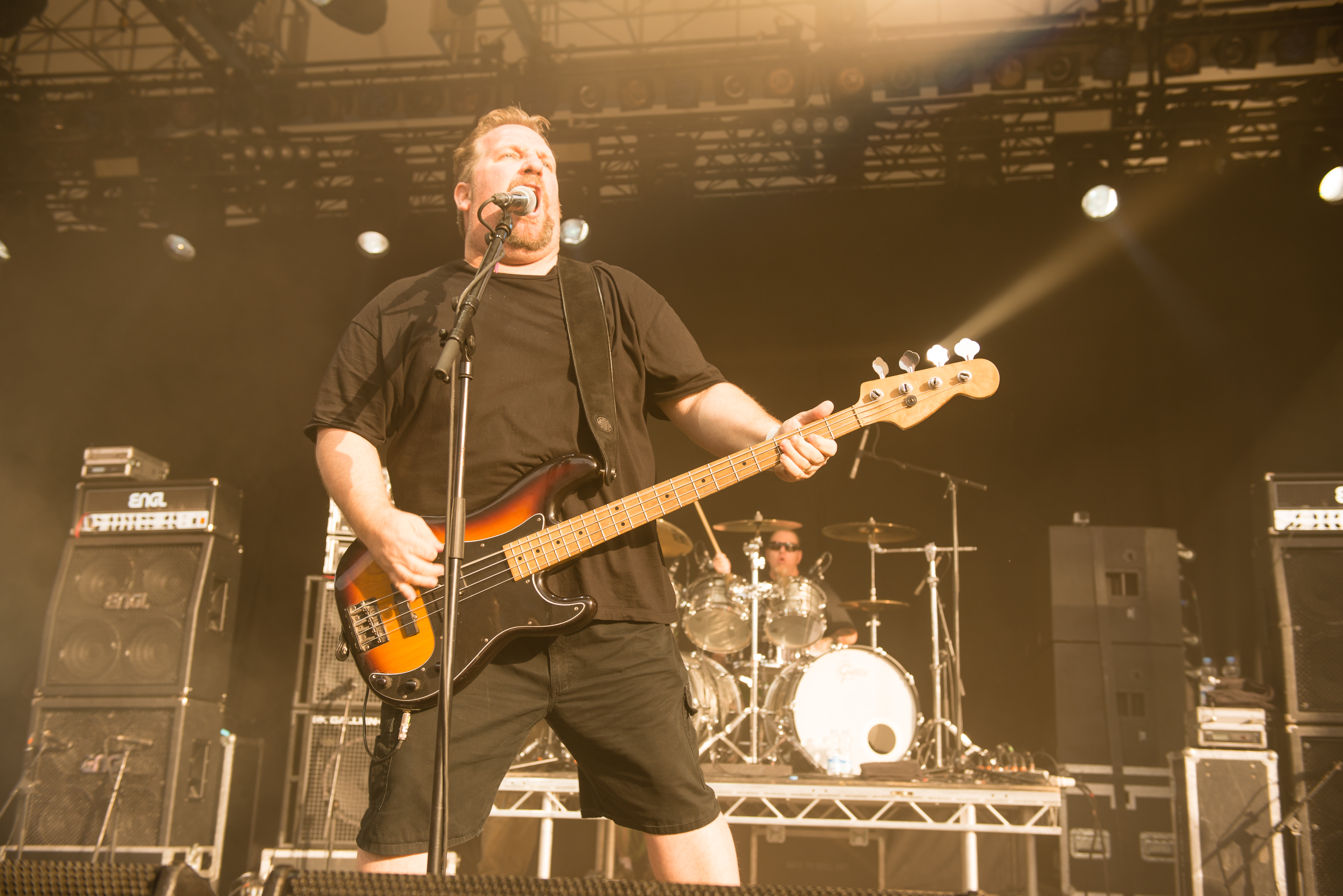
Phil Rind performing with Sacred Reich at the Rock Hard Festival in 2014

In November 2006, Sacred Reich announced they would play several shows in Europe in the summer of 2007 including Wacken Open Air, before reforming as a live act that year. They performed at Wacken Open Air again in 2009, which was recorded and later released as a live album, Live at Wacken, in 2012. In the spring of 2017, they announced their first North American tour in 21 years, titled "30 Years of Ignorance" after the 30th anniversary of their debut album, Ignorance.

In January 2018, Sacred Reich signed to Metal Blade Records and began working on their fifth album, Awakening. Later in January, Greg Hall was fired from the band and temporarily replaced by Tim Radziwill for the demos and touring. In September, Machine Head announced that Dave McClain was leaving their band, officially rejoining Sacred Reich in December. In February 2019, Rainey left the band for health reasons and was replaced by Tim Radziwill's son, Joey. In April, Sacred Reich released the split single "Don't Do it Donnie" alongside Iron Reagan, later co-headlining a monthlong tour with them in May. Awakening was released on August 23, 2019, being the band's first full-length studio album since 1996's Heal and their first studio album in 23 years. Awakening was well received by critics. At Metacritic, which assigns a weighted average rating out of 100 to reviews from mainstream publications, giving the album a 76 out of 100 rating based on 4 reviews. In support of the album, Sacred Reich toured in Europe alongside Night Demon, and supported Gwar on their Use Your Collusion tour that year. Rainey later died on March 16, 2020, at the age of 53 from a heart attack.

In the spring of 2023, Sacred Reich supported Carcass on a US tour along with Municipal Waste. At the beginning of 2024, Sacred Reich announced they were recording their upcoming sixth studio album, which was expected to be released at the end of the year. Rind announced in a post on New Year's Eve of 2024 that the band would soon enter the studio to record their new album for a late August 2025 release.

On October 20, 2025, it was announced that Sacred Reich had parted ways with McClain and would temporarily be filled in by Eduardo Baldo for their live activities, and also announced that their sixth studio album Into the Abyss would be released in the spring of 2026. However, the album's release was later pushed back to 2027.

On December 3, 2025, Baldo was announced as an official member of Sacred Reich. The band performed at Milwaukee Metal Fest in June 2026, and opened for Sepultura on select dates of their farewell tour.

== Musical style and lyrics ==
Sacred Reich is known for their political and social lyrics, which often focus on topics such as war, racism, and ecology. When asked by Revolver if the band had become more or less political with age, frontman Phil Rind said: "I think when you're younger and very idealistic, you want to change everything and you're going to do it. And I think now that I'm a little older, I know I can barely control myself, let alone tell anybody else what to do. Being a parent will do that to you as well. I just know that the best thing I can do is be the person who I want to be and be an example. Change yourself. That's a real victory."

The band's style, generally considered thrash metal, frequently uses mid-tempo song structures and takes influence from other genres such as punk rock and hardcore punk, as well as elements of groove metal on their later releases. The band's songs are generally short and based on simple guitar riffs; author Thierry Anzar said the songs develop a "communicative energy" reliant on strong choruses and lyrics.

== Influence and legacy ==
Revolver named Sacred Reich as "one of the most important thrash bands of the eighties and nineties". They dubbed their debut album Ignorance as "a milestone in the thrash movement", and the album later appeared on their "25 Essential Thrash Albums" list. Metal Hammer labeled the band as "among the few socially conscious thrashers in the 80s". The band is commonly attributed to helping lead the second wave of thrash metal during the late 1980s alongside bands such as Testament, Death Angel, Dark Angel, and Forbidden. Sacred Reich is credited with being a progenitor of groove metal, and their 1990 album The American Way is credited as being one of the first groove metal albums, released two months before Pantera's Cowboys from Hell and three years before Sepultura's Chaos A.D.

== Band members ==
Current members

- Phil Rind – bass, vocals (1985–2000, 2006–present)
- Wiley Arnett – lead guitar (1986–2000, 2006–present)
- Joey Radziwill – rhythm guitar (2019–present)
- Eduardo Baldo – drums (2025–present)

Touring musicians

- Chuck Fitzgerald – drums (1996)
- Tim Radziwill – drums (2018)

Former members

- Jason Rainey – rhythm guitar (1985–2000, 2006–2019, died 2020)
- Greg Hall – drums (1985–1991, 1996–2000, 2006–2018)
- Dan Kelly – vocals (1985–1986)
- Jeff Martinek – lead guitar (1985–1986, died 2018)
- Ray Nay – drums (1985)
- Mike Andre – bass (1985)
- Dave McClain – drums (1991–1996, 2018–2025)

== Discography ==
Studio albums

- Ignorance (1987)
- The American Way (1990)
- Independent (1993)
- Heal (1996)
- Awakening (2019)
- Into the Abyss (2027)

EPs

- Surf Nicaragua (1988)
- A Question (1991)

Live albums

- Alive at the Dynamo (1989)
- Still Ignorant (1997)
- Live at Wacken (2012)

Demos

- Draining You of Life (1985)

Compilations

- Ignorance/Surf Nicaragua (2007)
