= DSN Music =

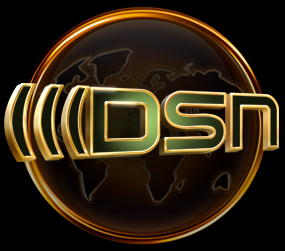
- Parent company: Digital Syndicate Network
- Founded: 2003
- Founder: Guy Giuliano
- Genre: Heavy metal, hip hop
- Country of origin: U.S.
- Official website: www.dsnmusic.com

DSN Music is an American record label and music licensing company that was founded in 2003 as a subsidiary of Arizona-based Digital Syndicate Network (DSN). DSN Music was founded by former EMusic executive Guy Giuliano. DSN issues music in the heavy metal and hip hop genres.

Digital Syndicate TV, was a video production company established in Las Vegas, Nevada in 2000, which produced broadcast television commercials, and music videos. The company produced the rock music video series Crank It Up! which ran over UPN owned TV stations in the fall of 2000, and later on the American Independent Network (AIN). In 2003, Digital Syndicate TV spun off a separate platform named Digital Syndicate Music, which showcased content from independent musicians. In the 2005, the entities where reorganized under a new Arizona-based company Digital Syndicate Network, and the music platform was transformed into a digital music label renamed DSN Music. In 2008, DSN purchased Portland, Oregon based Tom Kat Records, which provided the label distribution in brick and mortar retail outlets, for sales of CDs.

DSN Music has also produced several music documentaries, "Omen... Back For More" and "Static! The Rockumentary". The company's audio and video production facility, the DSN Media Center, was based in Sedona, Arizona from 2005-2022.

== Roster ==
- Action Toolbelt
- Agnus Jackson
- Beyond Perception
- Black Eyed Children
- Blackout
- Blue Hail
- Bratana
- Cage9
- Creeper
- Deathgrip
- Danimal
- Dark Alliance
- Defaced
- Dust (band)
- Edge Piece
- Futile Attempt
- Headless Charlie
- Jonelle Marie
- Left Standing
- Lit Soul
- Lynch
- Mercury Bullet
- Omen (band)
- Outlaw Devils
- Project Rogue
- Psycho Sister
- R.O.L.
- Roaring Truth
- Ron Marks
- Salva Me
- SlyKat
- Society 1
- Subsonic
- Sylo
- The Raygun Girls
- The Rudy Boy Experiment
- Thomas Troutman
- Ugly Little Doll
- Wicked Deception
- World Beneath World
