= Reopening the Gates =

Studio album by Omen
- Released: June 1997
- Recorded: Studio 610
- Genre: Groove metal; heavy metal
- Length: 42:01
- Label: Massacre
- Producer: Kenny Powell

Omen chronology
Escape to Nowhere (1988)	Reopening the Gates (1997)	Eternal Black Dawn (2003)

Professional ratings
Review scores
Source	Rating
Metal Rules	3.5/5 stars
Rock Hard	7.5/10 stars
Ultimate Metal Reviews	(7.9/10)

Reopening the Gates is the fifth studio album by American heavy metal band Omen, released in 1997 by Massacre Records. Kenny Powell is the only original Omen member playing on the album, and also the producer of it. The album is a stark departure from the band's other material, featuring a groove metal sound.

== Track listing ==
No.	Title	Length
1.	"Dead March"	4:02
2.	"Uneven Plow"	3:04
3.	"Chained"	3:14
4.	"Rain Down"	4:51
5.	"Reopening the Gates"	4:58
6.	"Everything"	4:50
7.	"Well Fed"	4:03
8.	"Crushing Day"	4:19
9.	"Saturday"	5:16
10.	"Into the Ground"	3:25

== Personnel ==
Omen

- Greg Powell – vocals, guitars
- Kenny Powell – guitars
- Andy Haas – bass
- Rick Murray – drums

Production

- Kenny Powell – production, engineering
- Greg Powell – assistant engineering
- Matt Story – graphic design
- Michael Insuaste – photography
