= Surf Nicaragua =

EP by Sacred Reich
- Released: October 4, 1988
- Genre: Thrash metal
- Length: 17:28; 26:03 (re-issue)
- Label: Metal Blade Records
- Producers: Bill Metoyer; Sacred Reich

Sacred Reich chronology
Ignorance (1987)	Surf Nicaragua (1988)	Alive at the Dynamo (1989)

Professional ratings
Review scores
Source	Rating
AllMusic	3/5 stars

Surf Nicaragua is an EP from American thrash metal band Sacred Reich. It was released on October 4, 1988, on Metal Blade Records and follows the band's debut album, Ignorance, released the previous year.

== Songs ==
The title track is about American imperialism in Latin America and the possibility of Americans going to war in Nicaragua. According to lead guitarist Wiley Arnett, vocalist-bassist Phil Rind explained that the song was about "the Sandinistas and what’s going on in Managua." "One Nation" expresses themes of anti-discrimination and prejudice, being described as "a call for Americans to reject racism and bigotry and work together to improve things" by Alex Henderson of AllMusic. The third track is a cover version of the Black Sabbath song, "War Pigs". The fourth track, "Draining You of Life", is originally from the band's first demo of the same name. The last two tracks are live recordings of the songs "Ignorance" and "Death Squad" respectively, originally from their debut album Ignorance.

== Track listing ==
All tracks are written by Phil Rind, except where noted.

Side A
No.	Title	Writer(s)	Length
1.	"Surf Nicaragua"		4:39
2.	"One Nation"	Rind, Wiley Arnett	3:24

Side B
No.	Title	Writer(s)	Length
3.	"War Pigs" (Black Sabbath cover)	Iommi, Osbourne, Butler, Ward	6:07
4.	"Draining You of Life"		3:18
Total length:			17:28

Bonus Tracks On All Formats
No.	Title	Length
1.	"Ignorance" (Live)	4:04
2.	"Death Squad" (Live)	4:31
Total length:		26:03

== Credits ==
- Phil Rind – bass, vocals
- Wiley Arnett – lead guitar
- Jason Rainey – rhythm guitar
- Greg Hall – drums
- Produced by Bill Metoyer and Sacred Reich
- Cover art by Paul Stottler
