= Burning in Water, Drowning in Flame (album) =

Studio album by Skrew
- Released: 1 December 1991
- Recorded: Chicago Trax Recording, Chicago, Illinois
- Genre: Industrial metal
- Length: 43:58
- Label: Metal Blade
- Producer: Chris Ault, Adam Grossman, Danny Lohner, Phil Owen

Skrew chronology
| Burning in Water, Drowning in Flame (1991) | Dusted (1994) |

Professional ratings
Review scores
| Source | Rating |
|---|---|
| Allmusic | 4/5 stars |

Burning in Water, Drowning in Flame is the debut album of Skrew, released on 1 December 1991 through Metal Blade Records. Al Jourgensen, Paul Barker and Mike Scaccia of Ministry all feature as guests. The track "Poisonous" features rapping and hip hop turntables.

== Track listing ==
All tracks are written by Adam Grossman and Danny Lohner, except "Sympathy for the Devil" by Mick Jagger and Keith Richards.

| No. | Title | Length |
|---|---|---|
| 1. | "Orifice" | 1:36 |
| 2. | "Burning in Water, Drowning in Flame" | 5:09 |
| 3. | "Cold Angel Press" | 5:06 |
| 4. | "Charlemagne" | 3:54 |
| 5. | "Gemini" | 3:14 |
| 6. | "Indestructible" | 3:14 |
| 7. | "Feast" | 5:04 |
| 8. | "Once Alive" | 3:46 |
| 9. | "Sympathy for the Devil" | 4:32 |
| 10. | "Poisonous" | 4:35 |
| 11. | "Prey Flesh" | 3:59 |

== Personnel ==
Studio line-up

- Adam Grossman – vocals, guitar, programming, design, production
- Danny Lohner – vocals, guitar, programming, production
- Chris Ault – keyboards, programming, production

Live line-up

- Adam Grossman – vocals, guitar
- Danny Lohner – vocals, guitar
- Chris Ault – keyboards
- George Lewis – drums
- Mark Dufour – drums
- Mike Peoples – bass guitar
- Mike Robinson – guitar

Production and additional personnel

- Keith Auerbach – engineering
- Tom Baker – mastering
- Paul Barker – engineering
- Charlemagne – choir
- George Lewis – drums
- John Herndon – percussion
- Billy Jackson – additional vocals
- Al Jourgensen – engineering, guitar
- Jim Marcus – additional vocals
- Tony Maingot – programming
- Keith Mestl – engineering
- Jeff Newell – engineering
- Phil Owen – production, additional vocals
- Mike Scaccia – guitar
- Jessica Villines – engineering
- Ricky Weir – programming
- Jason Wolford – turntables
