= Ignorance (Sacred Reich album) =

Studio album by Sacred Reich
- Released: October 13, 1987
- Recorded: 1987 at Stagg Street Studio; Preferred Sound; Track Record; California, USA
- Genre: Thrash metal
- Length: 32:34
- Label: Metal Blade
- Producer: Bill Metoyer; Sacred Reich

Sacred Reich chronology
Draining You of Life (1986)	Ignorance (1987)	Surf Nicaragua (1988)

Alternative cover
- Original and 30th anniversary reissue cover of the album

Ignorance is the debut studio album by American thrash metal band Sacred Reich. It was released on October 13, 1987, by Metal Blade Records, and was followed up by the 1988 EP, Surf Nicaragua.

The album was co-produced by the band and Bill Metoyer, who had previously engineered most of Slayer's early work. Metal Blade reissued the album and released a 30th anniversary version of it with its original artwork on September 8, 2017, with LP and Digipak CD versions being available.

It is considered to be an essential release in the genre by Revolver.

== Music and lyrics ==
The album's genre is thrash metal. The lyrics address topics such as war, racism, political repression, social justice, dictatorships, the Cold War, and Adolf Hitler.

== Cover art ==
The album's cover art depicts a blind-folded prisoner superimposed over the United States flag, which Metal Paths regarded as "a provocative sign of resistance against the Ronald Reagan administration and its actions." The album cover was initially different but was changed due to the label seeing it as "too punk-looking."

== Reception ==
Professional ratings
Review scores
Source	Rating
Allmusic	4.5/5 stars

In August 2014, Revolver placed Ignorance on its "14 Thrash Albums You Need to Own" list.

== Track listing ==
All tracks are written by Phil Rind, except where noted.

Side A
No.	Title	Writer(s)	Length
1.	"Death Squad"		4:24
2.	"Victim of Demise"		3:35
3.	"Layed to Rest" (Instrumental)	Wiley Arnett	2:20
4.	"Ignorance"		4:07
5.	"No Believers"	Rind, Jason Rainey	3:23

Side B
No.	Title	Writer(s)	Length
6.	"Violent Solutions"	Rind, Rainey	4:16
7.	"Rest in Peace"	Rind, Rainey	3:45
8.	"Sacred Reich"		3:17
9.	"Administrative Decisions"		3:27
Total length:			32:34

2012 limited edition 12" vinyl bonus tracks
No.	Title	Writer(s)	Length
1.	"Rapid Fire" (Judas Priest cover)	Rob Halford, Glenn Tipton K.K. Downing	3:42
2.	"The Big Picture" (MDC cover, originally performed by Subhumans)		1:34
3.	"Sweet Leaf" (Black Sabbath cover)	Ozzy Osbourne, Tony Iommi, Geezer Butler, Bill Ward	5:05
Total length:			42:55

30th anniversary edition digipak bonus tracks
No.	Title	Length
1.	"Ignorance" (From Metal Massacre VIII)	3:53
2.	"Draining You of Life" (Demo)	3:41
3.	"Rest in Peace" (Demo)	4:06
4.	"Sacred Reich" (Demo)	3:26
5.	"No Believers" (Demo)	3:37
Total length:		18:45

30th anniversary edition vinyl bonus track
No.	Title	Length
1.	"Ignorance" (From Metal Massacre VIII)	3:53

== Personnel ==
- Phil Rind – vocals, bass
- Wiley Arnett – lead guitar
- Jason Rainey – rhythm guitar
- Greg Hall – drums
- Dan Kelly – vocals on 11–14 tracks
- Jeff Martinek – lead guitar on 11–14 tracks
- Mike Andre – bass on 11–14 tracks
- Ray Nay – drums on 11–14 tracks

=== Additional Personnel ===
- Produced by Bill Metoyer and Sacred Reich
- Engineered by Bill Metoyer
- Assistant engineered by Richard McIntosh, Scott Campbell, Ken Paulakovich, and Bryan Carlstrom
- Mixed at Track Record
- Executive produced by Brian Slagel
- Artwork by Paul Stottler
