= Eternal Black Dawn =

Studio album by Omen
- Released: September 15, 2003
- Genre: Heavy metal
- Length: 45:46
- Label: Crash Music Inc. (US); Mausoleum (Europe)
- Producer: Kenny Powell

Omen chronology
Reopening the Gates (1997)	Eternal Black Dawn (2003)	Into the Arena (2012)

Professional ratings
Review scores
Source	Rating
AllMusic	2.5/5 stars
BW&BK	6.5/10 stars
Kerrang!	2/5 stars
Metal Crypt	(3.75/5)
Metal Invader	4/6 stars
Metal Reviews	55/100
Rock Hard (1)	8/10
Rock Hard (2)	3/10
Sea of Tranquility	3.5/5 stars

Eternal Black Dawn is the sixth studio album of the American heavy metal band Omen. It was originally released in 2003 by Crash Music Inc. Since 1997 and their last studio album, Reopening the Gates, Omen had changed vocalists, with Kevin Goocher replacing Greg Powell.

== Track listing ==
No.	Title	Writer(s)	Length
1.	"1000 Year Reign"	Omen	4:20
2.	"Eternal Black Dawn"	Omen	4:23
3.	"Burning Times"	Omen	5:50
4.	"Blood Feud"	Omen	3:42
5.	"House on Rue Royale"	Omen	5:22
6.	"King of the Seven Seas"	Omen	4:41
7.	"Chains of Delirium"	Omen	3:54
8.	"Chaos in the Cathedral"	Omen	6:08
9.	"Specter of Battles Past (Medley)"	Omen	7:27

== Personnel ==
Omen

- Kevin Goocher – vocals
- Kenny Powell – guitars
- Andy Haas – bass
- Rick Murray – drums

Production

- Kenny Powell – production
