= Damnation Alley (album) =

EP by Bitch
- Released: 1982
- Recorded: 1982
- Studio: Hit City West, Los Angeles, and Backroom Recorders, Sherman Oaks, California (Exact dates unknown)
- Genre: Heavy metal
- Length: 20:39
- Label: Metal Blade / Enigma
- Producer: Phil Pecora and Brian Slagel

Bitch chronology
Damnation Alley (1982)	Be My Slave (1983)

Professional ratings
Review scores
Source	Rating
Collector's Guide to Heavy Metal	5/10

Damnation Alley is an EP by American heavy metal band Bitch, and was released on the Metal Blade Records label. The EP-length release has the distinction of being the first album by a single artist and the second album of any kind released on Metal Blade Records (the first was the 1982 compilation album Metal Massacre).

== Track listing ==
All tracks written by Bitch

1. "Saturdays" (4:16)
2. "Never Come Home" (2:52)
3. "Damnation Alley" (4:00)
4. "He's Gone" (3:37)
5. "Live for the Whip" (5:53)

== Personnel ==
=== Band members ===
- Betsy Bitch - lead vocals
- David Carruth - guitar
- Mark Anthony Webb - bass
- Robby Settles - drums

=== Additional musicians ===
- Richard Zusman - bass
