= Independent (Sacred Reich album) =

Studio album by Sacred Reich
- Released: February 23, 1993
- Recorded: 1992
- Studio: Eldorado Studios, North Hollywood, California
- Genre: Groove metal; thrash metal
- Length: 47:49
- Label: Metal Blade, Hollywood
- Producer: Dave Jerden, Sacred Reich

Sacred Reich chronology
A Question (1991)	Independent (1993)	Heal (1996)

Professional ratings
Review scores
Source	Rating
AllMusic	2.5/5 stars

Independent is the third studio album by American thrash metal band Sacred Reich, released in 1993 via Metal Blade and Hollywood Records. The album is considered to be a slight departure from the band's early thrash metal style heard on their previous releases, with the album featuring a groove metal sound. Independent was Sacred Reich's first full-length album with Dave McClain on drums.

== Track listing ==
No.	Title	Writer(s)	Length
1.	"Independent"	Phil Rind	3:38
2.	"Free"	Phil Rind	4:34
3.	"Just Like That"	Phil Rind, Jason Rainey	5:42
4.	"Supremacy"	Phil Rind	2:37
5.	"If Only" (Instrumental)	Wiley Arnett	3:46
6.	"Crawling"	Phil Rind, Dave McClain	6:30
7.	"Pressure"	Phil Rind	2:47
8.	"Product"	Phil Rind	3:44
9.	"I Never Said Goodbye"	Phil Rind	7:46
10.	"Open Book"	Rind, Dave McClain	4:21
11.	"Do It"	Phil Rind	2:24
12.	"Let's Have a War" (Fear cover, bonus track)	Lee Ving	2:21
Total length:			47:49

== Personnel ==
- Phil Rind – bass, vocals
- Wiley Arnett – lead guitar
- Jason Rainey – rhythm guitar
- Dave McClain – drums

=== Additional credits ===
- Recorded and mixed at Eldorado Studios, North Hollywood, California, US
- Produced by Dave Jerden and Sacred Reich
- Engineered by Bryan Carlstrom
- Assistant engineered by Annette Cisneros
- Mixed by Dave Jerden
- Mastered by Eddy Schreyer at Future Disc Systems
- Cover illustration by Paul Stottler
- Portrait illustration (inlay) by John Dawson
