= Shadow of Doubt (album) =

Studio album by Skrew
- Released: March 25, 1996
- Genre: Industrial metal
- Length: 55:40
- Label: Metal Blade
- Producer: Neil Kernon

Skrew chronology
| Dusted (1994) | Shadow of Doubt (1996) | Angel Seed XXIII (1997) |

Professional ratings
Review scores
| Source | Rating |
|---|---|
| Allmusic | 2/5 stars |

Shadow of Doubt is the third album by Skrew, released on March 25, 1996 through Metal Blade Records.

== Track listing ==
All lyrics are written by Adam Grossman; all music is composed by Adam Grossman and Jim Vollentine, except "Knotted Twigg" co-written with Robb Lampman and Jed Simon and "Dark Ride" co-written with Robb Lampman.

| No. | Title | Length |
|---|---|---|
| 1. | "She Said" | 5:04 |
| 2. | "Black Eye" | 5:10 |
| 3. | "Knotted Twigg" | 5:19 |
| 4. | "Head" | 5:48 |
| 5. | "Swallow" | 5:08 |
| 6. | "Sam I Am" | 4:26 |
| 7. | "Going Down" | 5:57 |
| 8. | "Generator" | 4:45 |
| 9. | "Dark Ride" | 6:02 |
| 10. | "Crawl" | 8:05 |

== Personnel ==
Skrew

- Chadwick Davis – bass guitar
- Adam Grossman – vocals, guitar, programming, cover art
- Bobby Gustafson – guitar
- Robb Lampman – Guitar
- Jim Vollentine – keyboards, programming, cover art

Production and additional personnel

- Neil Kernon – production, recording
- Bill Metoyer – mixing
