= Betsy (Betsy album) =

Studio album by Betsy
- Released: 29 September 2017
- Recorded: 2014–June 2017
- Genre: Pop
- Length: 37:34
- Label: Warner Bros.
- Producer: Various: Betsy; Alexander Burnett; Dreamtrak; Jonas Quant; Blue May; Jim Eliot; Jack McManus; Shama Joseph; Oliver Wright; Peter Jarrett; Mark Ralph

Betsy chronology
Fair (2016)	Betsy (2017)

Singles from Betsy
- 1. "Fair" Released: 22 January 2016; 2. "Lost & Found" Released: 5 August 2016; 3. "Wanted More" Released: 4 November 2016; 4. "Waiting" Released: 27 January 2017; 5. "Little White Lies" Released: 2 June 2017

Professional ratings
Review scores
Source	Rating
Clash Music	8/10
The Observer	3/5 stars

Betsy is the self-titled debut studio album by Welsh singer-songwriter Betsy. It was released by Warner Bros. Records on 29 September 2017.

== Background ==
After completing a course in fashion design in Central St Martins and working at Balenciaga in Paris, Betsy returned to the United Kingdom to pursue her dream of becoming a musician. She self-produced a three-track demo EP which later secured her a management deal. Betsy retreated to her brother's caravan for two months to write songs, a number of which appear on her debut album. In addition to her own self-written songs, she also worked with producers such as Jim Eliot, Sak Pase and Jack McManus on some of the album's tracks.

== Release ==
Although initially scheduled to be released on 26 May 2017, the album was later pushed back to 29 September. Betsy revealed the release date with the digital pre-order on 30 June. The album artwork and tracklisting were subsequently revealed on 18 August.

== Promotion ==
=== Singles ===
"Fair" was released as the album's first - and Betsy's debut - single on 22 January 2016. "Lost & Found" followed as the second single on 5 August 2016, and Betsy appeared on the cover of Spotify's New Music Friday playlist in the UK to promote the single's release. On 4 November 2016, "Wanted More" was released as the third single from the album, and "Waiting" followed as the fourth single on 27 January 2017. "Little White Lies" was released as the album's fifth - and to date, final - single on 2 June 2017.

=== Promotional singles ===
"You Won't Love Me" served as an instant gratification track with the album pre-order, and was released on 25 August 2017. "Heavy Head" was confirmed to be the album's second promotional single in November 2017 when she performed the track on the BBC's Children in Need appeal show in Wales. A Kat Krazy remix of the song was released on 8 December 2017.

== Track listing ==
No.	Title	Writer(s)	Producer(s)	Length
1.	"Little White Lies"	Elizabeth Humfrey; Tim Woodcock	Alexander Burnett; Dreamtrak	3:23
2.	"Lost & Found"	Humfrey	Burnett; Dreamtrak; Blue May; Peter Jarret; Jonas Quant	2:58
3.	"Fair"	Humfrey	Humfrey; Jarrett	3:34
4.	"Last Time We Danced"	Humfrey; Jim Eliot	Eliot	3:08
5.	"Heavy Head"	Humfrey	Fred Cox; Aaron Horn; Jarrett	3:18
6.	"Hope"	Humfrey; Shama Joseph	Sak Pase	2:43
7.	"Wanted More"	Humfrey	Jarrett; Dreamtrak; Burnett	3:44
8.	"You Won't Love Me"	Humfrey; Jack McManus	McManus; Jarrett; Mark Ralph; Jay Reynolds	3:24
9.	"So Much Love"	Humfrey; McManus	McManus; Oliver Wright; Jarrett	3:34
10.	"Waiting"	Humfrey; McManus	Jarrett; McManus	3:16
11.	"Body Burn"	Humfrey	May; Jarrett	4:36
Total length:				37:34

== Personnel ==
Credits adapted from AllMusic.

Musicians

- Betsy – vocals, production, keyboards
- Tim Woodcock – background vocals
- Blue May – vocal producer
- Simon Elms – trumpet, flugelhorn
- Geoff Holroyde – drums
- Andy Brown – conductor
- Robin Mullarkey – bass
- Rob Malarkey – bass
- London Metropolitan Orchestra – strings, orchestra
- Tim Baxter – strings, orchestration
- Izzi Dunn – strings, orchestration
- Jessica Dannheiser – orchestration
- Jonas Quant – strings
- Colin Smith – saxophone
- Jack McManus – piano, keyboards, backing vocals
- Matt Johnson – piano
- Peter Jarrett – piano, percussion, keyboards
- Alex Reeves – additional drums

Technical

- Alexander Burnett – production, programming
- Blue May – production, engineering
- Dreamtrak – production, programming
- Jack McManus – production, programming
- Jim Eliot – production
- Jonas Quant – production, programming
- Mark Ralph – production, mixing
- Peter Jarrett – production, additional production, programming
- Hal Ritson – programming
- Richard Adlam – programming
- Jay Reynolds – additional production
- Oliver Wright – additional production, mixing
- BiLLLy – programming
- Drew Smith – engineering
- Izzi Dunn – engineering
- Robbie Nelson – engineering
- SAK PASE – production
- Sean and Seng – photography
- Betsy – art direction, production
- Mat Maitland – art direction, design
- Drew Smith – mixing, engineering
- Tom Ad Fuller – mixing
- John Davis – mastering

== Charts ==
Chart (2017)	Peak position
UK Albums (OCC)	90
Scottish Albums (OCC)	98
