= Bratanov =

Bratanov (Bulgarian: Братанов) is a Bulgarian male surname, its feminine counterpart is Bratanova. Notable people with the surname include:

- Kiril Bratanov (1911–1986), Bulgarian biologist
- Velko Bratanov (born 1949), Bulgarian modern pentathlete
- Yanko Bratanov (born 1952), Bulgarian sprinter
