= Betsy Hollow =

Valley in Missouri, United States

Coordinates: 36.8320006°N 91.4493045°W

Betsy Hollow is a valley in Oregon County in the U.S. state of Missouri.

Betsy Hollow has the name of Betsy Sipe, a pioneer settler.
