= The Bitch Is Back (Bitch album) =

Studio album by Bitch
- Released: 1 March 1987
- Recorded: December 1986 – February 1987
- Studios: Stagg Street Studios, Van Nuys, Preferred Sound, Woodland Hills, and Track Record Studios, Hollywood, California
- Genre: Heavy metal
- Length: 36:27
- Label: Metal Blade / Enigma
- Producer: Joe Romersa

Bitch chronology
Be My Slave (1983)	The Bitch Is Back (1987)	Betsy (1987)

Professional ratings
Review scores
Source	Rating
AllMusic	4.5/5 stars
Kerrang!	1.5/5 stars

The Bitch Is Back is a studio album by American heavy metal band Bitch, released in 1987 on Metal Blade Records. It gets its name from the cover version of the Elton John song "The Bitch Is Back". AllMusic's Alex Henderson gave the records 4.5 stars, calling it a reminder of "how brutally fun real metal can be".

== Track listing ==
- All songs written and arranged by Bitch, except where noted.

Side one

1. "Do You Want to Rock" - 3:44
2. "Hot and Heavy" - 4:25
3. "Me and the Boys" - 3:27
4. "Storm Raging Up" - 5:58

Side two

5. "The Bitch Is Back" (Elton John, Bernie Taupin) - 3:13
6. "Head Banger" - 3:28
7. "Fist to Face" - 4:14
8. "Turns Me On" (David Carruth) - 4:09
9. "Skullcrusher" - 4:06

== Personnel ==
=== Band members ===
- Betsy Bitch - lead vocals
- David Carruth - guitar
- Ron Cordy - bass
- Robby Settles - drums

=== Additional musicians ===
- Mick Adrian - additional background vocals
- Joe Romersa - keyboards on "Storm Raging Up", "Hot and Heavy", and "Skullcrusher", additional backing vocals
- Stanley 'Dad of a Bitch' Weiss - saxophone on "The Bitch Is Back"

=== Production ===
- Joe Romersa - producer
- Bill Metoyer - engineer
- Kevin Beauchamp, Scott Campbell, Kevin Paulakovich - assistant engineers
- John Scarpati - Photography (Front and Back Cover)
