= Betsy (Bitch album) =

Studio album by Betsy
- Released: 1988
- Studio: Sound City Studios
- Genre: Hard rock
- Label: Metal Blade / Enigma
- Producer: Chris Minto

Betsy chronology
The Bitch Is Back (1987)	Betsy (1988)

Betsy is a studio album by Betsy Weiss and members of American heavy metal band Bitch, released in 1988 on Metal Blade Records. Although the album was recorded by the same group as the previous two heavier, and S&M-themed, heavy metal albums, the band released this third album under the artist name Betsy, the name of Betsy Weiss a.k.a. "Betsy Bitch", their lead singer, and with a softer and more commercial sound which was all done in an effort and in hopes to appeal to a wider audience. After the album the band reverted to their heavier sound along with the name Bitch after this attempt at commercialism proved unsuccessful.

== Track listing ==
1. You Want It You Got It 3:25 (Bruce Turgon, Chris Minto, Pamela Moore)
2. You'll Never Get Out (of This Love Alive) 3:18 (Minto, Moore, Gary Cambra)
3. Devil Made You Do It 4:00 (Betsy Weiss, "The Boys")
4. Rock N' Roll Musician 4:13 (Weiss, David Carruth)
5. Cold Shot to the Heart 3:45 (Weiss, "The Boys")
6. Flesh and Blood 2:50 (Turgon, Minto, Barlow)
7. Turn You Inside Out 3:44 (Minto, Barlow, "The Boys")
8. What Am I Gonna Do with You 4:36 (Weiss, "The Boys")
9. Stand Up for Rock 3:43 (Weiss, Ron Cordy)
10. Sunset Strut 4:28 (Weiss, "The Boys")
11. Get Out 2:55
