= Betsy (Welsh singer) =

- Birth name: Elizabeth Humfrey
- Born: Pembrokeshire, Wales
- Genres: Pop; soul-pop
- Occupations: Singer; songwriter
- Years active: 2014–present
- Labels: Warner Bros.; Columbia
- Website: betsymusic.co.uk

Elizabeth "Betsy" Humfrey (stylized as BETSY) is a Welsh singer from Pembrokeshire. She is signed to Warner Bros. Records worldwide, and was signed to Columbia Records in the US and Canada prior to May 2017. Betsy toured the UK from 25 August 2017, prior to a self-titled debut album which was issued by Warner Brothers on 29 September 2017.

== Early life ==
Betsy was raised on a rural goose farm in Nevern, Wales. Her mother bought the goose business next to their home, and it subsequently moved to their house. She became interested in music at a young age as she was so immersed in it: she claims that "[there] was always loads of singing in school and church, plus Eisteddfods. My father and uncle were in a local band so it was a big part of family life". Although she wanted to pursue music as a career, her parents encouraged her to have a sensible back-up plan, so she enrolled in a course in Womenswear at London's Central St Martins art college. She was later offered an internship at the fashion house Balenciaga, and later spent over a year working at the company designing for their catwalk shows. Despite this, her passion for music continued to eat away at her, so she eventually left the company and returned to her brother's bedroom in Wales to produce a three-track demo. After sending it out to various industry figures, she received no replies until a friend at her PR firm gave the demo to her later-manager who was looking for female vocalists. After signing her management deal, she was given £500 to write songs for six weeks in her brother's caravan. The same caravan appears in many of her early press shots; Betsy recalls having to clean the caravan for five days as "[some] guy had been living in it before me and he'd only fried everything". After completing a number of songs, her management pitched her to various record labels, and she landed deals with Columbia in the US and Canada and Warner Bros for the rest of the world.

Betsy cites Shirley Bassey, Annie Lennox, Cher, and Tina Turner as inspirations.

== Career ==
Betsy's first appearance as a vocalist was on Joe Goddard's 2014 single, "Endless Love". Her solo debut, "Fair", arrived on 22 January 2016 to rave reviews. Its parent EP - similarly titled "Fair" - followed on 18 March 2016. A number of singles - including "Lost & Found", "Wanted More", "Waiting" and "Little White Lies" - preceded her debut self-titled album which was released on 29 September 2017.

== Discography ==
=== Studio albums ===
Title	Album details	Peak chart positions	
Title	Album details	UK	SCO
Betsy	Released: 29 September 2017; Label: Warner Bros; Formats: CD, digital download	90	98

=== Extended plays ===
Title	Details
Fair	Released: 18 March 2016; Label: Warner, Columbia; Format: Digital download
Acoustic	Released: 22 December 2017; Label: Warner; Format: Digital download
Sugar Daddy	Released: 4 June 2021; Label: Sweat Entertainment, Songular Music; Format: Digital download
