= Bratana =

American heavy metal band

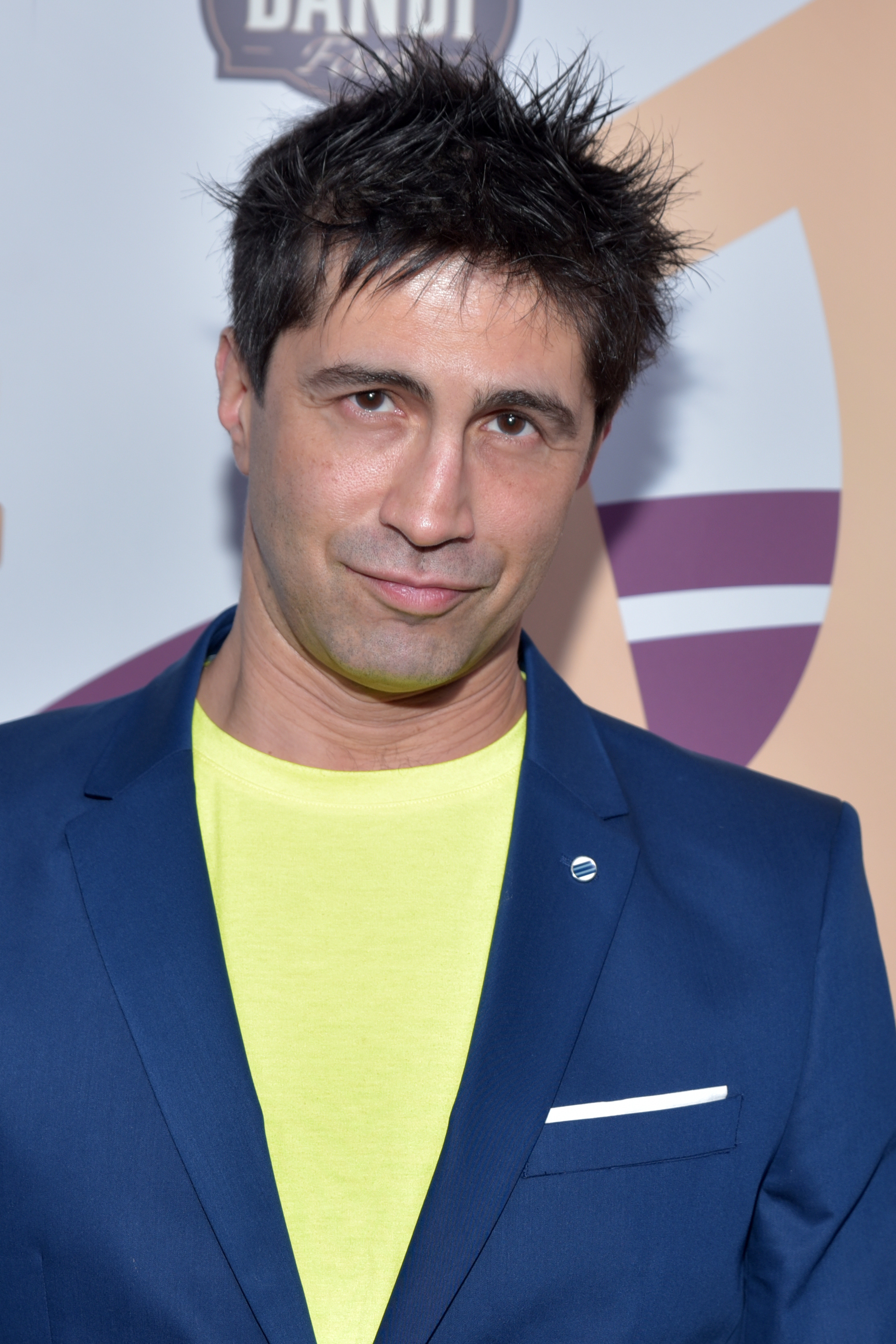
- Val Lapin Lead singer of Bratana Rock Band 2020

Background information
- Origin: Los Angeles, California, United States
- Genres: Heavy metal
- Years active: 2006–present
- Labels: DSN Music, 13 Music Ltd.
- Members: Jake Fehres; Alejandro Mercado; Patrick Morton; Alex Messano; Val Lapin
- Website: www.bratana.com

Bratana is an American heavy metal band formed in 2006 by Val Lapin and Serge Zuravka in Los Angeles CA. The band was initially called SoulSale. The first studio album, Rockin' Addiction featuring the single Kill Puppets with Sen Dog (Cypress Hill) and produced by Billy Graziadei was released via 13 Music Ltd. on January 24, 2017.

The current band line-up includes Jake Fehres on bass, Alejandro Mercado on drums, and the addition of Patrick Morton and Alex Messano on guitars, Val Lapin vocals.

On January 24 of 2017 Bratana opened for UDO Dirkschneider at the Whisky a Go Go.

December 20 of 2019, Bratana released a new single "False Ambitions" via DSN Music, and was produced Billy Graziadei at Firewater Studios in Hollywood, CA. The two would regroup for the project "Crypto King" in 2025. Bratana's recent single "For The Kill" released on August 4th, 2026 with decent radio airplay, for the more mainstream track.
