= Omen (band) =

American heavy metal band

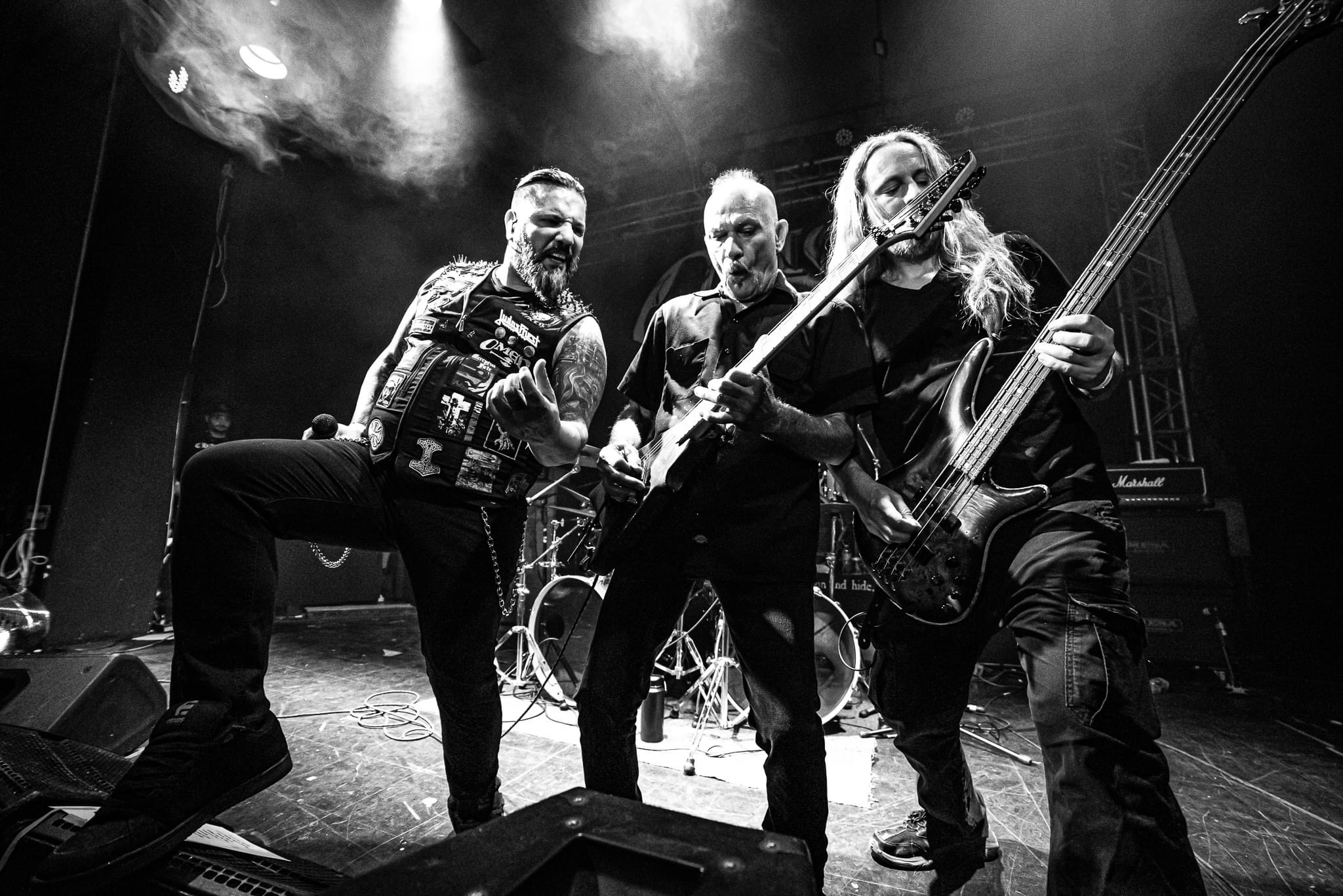

Background information
- Origin: Los Angeles, California, U.S.
- Genres: Heavy metal, power metal
- Years active: 1983–1988, 1996–present
- Labels: KRP, Metal Blade, DSN
- Members: Kenny Powell; Justin Riddler; Reece Stanley; Nikos Migus A.
- Past members: Steve Whittig; Kevin Goocher; Coburn Pharr; J.D. Kimball; Greg Powell; Glenn Malicki; Scott Clute; Jody Henry; Cam Daigneault; Rick Murray; George Call; Danny White; Wampa Zayas; Andy Haas

Omen is an American heavy metal band formed in Los Angeles in 1983 by lead guitarist Kenny Powell.

AllMusic described the band's sound as "melodic yet aggressive power metal/fantasy metal" akin to acts such as King Diamond, Queensrÿche, Savatage, Manowar, and Helloween.

== History ==
The band was formed in Los Angeles, California, in 1983 by lead guitarist Kenny Powell, previously with the band Savage Grace, and signed on with Metal Blade in 1984, with whom they released their debut, Battle Cry. (It contained the song "The Axeman", which appeared on the soundtrack for the heavy metal-themed 2009 video game Brütal Legend.)

In 1985, the second album Warning of Danger followed. In 1986, they released The Curse, their first release with major label distribution by Capitol Records in the US. In Japan the band climbed to number 14 in the Burrn! Charts.

With new singer Coburn Pharr (who would later leave to join Annihilator), the band released Escape to Nowhere in 1988, which contained "Thorn in Your Flesh". This track was their first hit single in the US.

In 1996, they signed with new label Massacre Records and toured Europe with Fates Warning for the first time. In October 2003, their former singer, J.D. Kimball, died, having succumbed to cancer after three years of treatment.

Currently, Omen has released seven studio albums worldwide, and a 20th anniversary box set. The release Hammer Damage has been delayed for more than eight years and was released in 2016 via DSN Music.

In 2019 they released a new EP named “Alive”.

Omen is still touring Europe, South America, and the USA.

The band played at the Hell's Heroes music festival held in Houston in March 2024. They returned to the festival the following year. Later in 2025, former bass guitarist Jody Henry died from a brain haemorrhage on October 12.

== Members ==
Current members

- Kenny Powell — guitar, backing vocals (1984–1989, 1996–present)
- Reece Stanley — drums (2017–present)
- Nikos Migus Antonogiannakis — lead vocals (2017–present)
- Justin Riddler — bass (2022–present)

Former members

- Jody Henry — bass, backing vocals (1984–1989; died 2025)
- Steve Wittig — drums (1984–1988, 2008–2009, 2012–2017)
- John "J. D." Kimball — lead vocals (1984–1987; died 2003)
- Coburn Pharr — lead vocals (1987–1989; died 2025)
- Cam Daigneault — drums (1988–1989)
- Andy Haas — bass (1996–2004, 2009–2017)
- Rick Murray — drums (1996–2004)
- Greg Powell — lead vocals, guitar (1996–1998)
- Kevin Goocher — lead vocals (1998–2008, 2014–2017)
- Danny White — drums (2006–2008, 2009–2010)
- Glenn Malicki — bass (2006–2008)
- Scott Clute — bass (2008–2009)
- Matt Story — lead vocals (2008, 2010–2014)
- George Call — lead vocals (2008–2010)
- Wampa Zayas — drums (2009, 2010–2012)
- Roger Sisson — bass (2017–2022)

== Discography ==
=== Studio albums ===
Date of Release	Title	Label
November 1984	Battle Cry	Metal Blade
October 1985	Warning of Danger	Metal Blade
October 1986	The Curse	Metal Blade
October 1988	Escape to Nowhere	Metal Blade
March 1997	Reopening the Gates	Massacre
September 15, 2003	Eternal Black Dawn	Crash
May 31, 2016	Hammer Damage	DSN Music

=== Live albums ===
Date of Release	Title	Label
December 20, 2011	Into the Arena	DSN Music

=== EPs ===
Date of Release	Title	Label
April 1987	Nightmares	Metal Blade

=== Compilation albums ===
Date of Release	Title	Label
November 1989	Teeth of the Hydra	Metal Blade
January 1998	Battle Anthems	Metal Invader
2010	Blood – Steel – Vengeance	KRP
December 20, 2011	Into the Arena	DSN Music

=== Box sets ===
Date of Release	Title	Label
September 10, 2003	20th Anniversary Box Set	Metal Blade

=== Video albums ===
Date of Release	Title	Label
September 10, 2003	Live at the Country Club, Los Angeles, September 1984	Metal Blade
