= Escape to Nowhere (album) =

Studio album by Omen
- Released: October 31, 1988
- Studio: The Record Plant, New York City
- Genre: Heavy metal
- Length: 38:50
- Label: Metal Blade (US); Roadrunner (Europe)
- Producer: Paul O'Neill

Omen chronology
Nightmares (EP) (1987)	Escape to Nowhere (1988)	Reopening the Gates (1997)

Professional ratings
Review scores
Source	Rating
AllMusic	2/5 stars
Rock Hard	7/10 stars

Escape to Nowhere is the fourth studio album by American heavy metal band Omen. It was originally released in 1988 via Metal Blade Records.

It is the first Omen album with Coburn Pharr on vocals (later an Annihilator member), replacing J.D. Kimball. Cam Daigneault had replaced Steve Witting on drums before the album's release, but all drums tracks used in the album are played by Witting.

Escape to Nowhere is the first Omen album to feature keyboards.

== Track listing ==
No.	Title	Writer(s)	Length
1.	"It's Not Easy"		5:10
2.	"Radar Love" (Golden Earring cover)	George Kooymans, Barry Hay	6:07
3.	"Escape to Nowhere"		4:20
4.	"Cry for the Morning"		4:05
5.	"Thorn in Your Flesh"		4:03
6.	"Poisoned"		4:31
7.	"Nomads"		3:15
8.	"King of the Hill"		4:06
9.	"No Way Out"		3:14

== Personnel ==
Omen

- Coburn Pharr – vocals
- Kenny Powell – guitars
- Jody Henry – bass
- Steve Wittig – drums

Additional musicians

- Bob Kinkel – keyboards
- Paul Silver – additional guitar on "Radar Love"
- Cam Daigneault – drums (replaced Steve Witting after the album's recording)
- Chris Holly – guitar (North American tour)

Production

- Paul O'Neill – production, arrangements
- Omen – arrangements
- James Ball – engineer
- Jon Goldwater – management
- Gary Smith – cover painting
- Wendy Kramer – Design
