= The Curse (Omen album) =

Studio album by Omen
- Released: October 1986
- Recorded: Music Grinder Studios, Los Angeles, California; Track Record Studios, Los Angeles, California; Preferred Sound Studios Woodland Hills, Los Angeles; Pacific Recording Studios, San Mateo, California
- Genre: Heavy metal
- Length: 45:47 (original); 65:58 (1996 re-issue)
- Label: Metal Blade (US); Roadrunner (Europe)
- Producer: Bill Metoyer and Omen

Omen chronology
Warning of Danger (1985)	The Curse (1986)	Nightmares (1987)

Alternative cover
- The 1996 re-issue, including the Nightmares EP

Professional ratings
Review scores
Source	Rating
AllMusic	3/5 stars
Rock Hard	8.5/10 stars

The Curse is the third studio album by American heavy metal band Omen. It was originally released in 1986 by Metal Blade. In 1996, Metal Blade re-released The Curse with the EP Nightmares as bonus tracks.

This is the final studio album recorded by Omen's original lineup.

== Track listing ==
Original LP
No.	Title	Length
1.	"The Curse"	5:48
2.	"Kill on Sight"	4:53
3.	"Holy Martyr"	4:05
4.	"Eye of the Storm"	4:14
5.	"S.R.B."	5:49
6.	"Teeth of the Hydra"	6:01
7.	"At All Cost"	5:29
8.	"Destiny"	3:27
9.	"Bounty Hunter"	4:27
10.	"The Larch"	1:34

1996 re-issue bonus tracks (Nightmares EP)
No.	Title	Writer(s)	Length
11.	"Nightmares"		2:48
12.	"Shock Treatment"		2:37
13.	"Dragon's Breath"		2:58
14.	"Termination"	J.D. Kimball, Kenny Powell	3:30
15.	"Bounty Hunter"		4:22
16.	"Whole Lotta Rosie" (live AC/DC cover)	Angus Young, Bon Scott, Malcolm Young	3:53

== Personnel ==
Omen

- J.D. Kimball – vocals
- Kenny Powell – guitars
- Steve Wittig – drums
- Jody Henry – bass

=== Production ===
- Bill Metoyer – production
- Brian Slagel - executive producer
- Mixed By Bill Metroyer and Steve Himelfarb at Capitol Studios, Hollywood, Los Angeles
- Gerald McLaughlin - illustration
- Mastered by Eddy Schreyer at Capitol Mastering
