= Warning of Danger =

Studio album by Omen
- Released: October 24, 1985
- Studio: Eldorado (Burbank, California)
- Genre: Heavy metal
- Length: 40:59
- Label: Metal Blade
- Producer: Brian Slagel, Omen

Omen chronology
| Battle Cry (1984) | Warning of Danger (1985) | The Curse (1986) |

Alternative cover
- 1989 re-issue, including the Nightmares EP

Professional ratings
Review scores
| Source | Rating |
|---|---|
| AllMusic | 3/5 stars |
| The Metal Crypt | 5/5 stars |
| Rock Hard | 8.5/10 stars |

Warning of Danger is the second studio album by American heavy metal band Omen. It was originally released in 1985 by Metal Blade Records. In 1989, Metal Blade re-released the album with the EP Nightmares as bonus tracks.

== Track listing ==
- All songs written by J.D. Kimball, Jody Henry and Kenny Powell, except where noted.

Original LP
| No. | Title | Writer(s) | Length |
|---|---|---|---|
| 1. | "Warning of Danger" | | 4:25 |
| 2. | "March On" | | 4:03 |
| 3. | "Ruby Eyes (of the Serpent)" | | 3:51 |
| 4. | "Don't Fear the Night" | | 5:04 |
| 5. | "V.B.P" | Henry, Powell | 5:01 |
| 6. | "Premonition" | Kimball, Powell | 1:52 |
| 7. | "Termination" | Kimball, Powell | 3:34 |
| 8. | "Make Me Your King" | | 3:49 |
| 9. | "Red Horizon" | | 3:38 |
| 10. | "Hell's Gate" | | 5:38 |

1989 re-issue bonus tracks (Nightmares EP)
| No. | Title | Writer(s) | Length |
|---|---|---|---|
| 11. | "Nightmares" | | 2:48 |
| 12. | "Shock Treatment" | | 2:37 |
| 13. | "Dragon's Breath" | | 2:58 |
| 14. | "Termination" | J.D. Kimball, Kenny Powell | 3:30 |
| 15. | "Bounty Hunter" | | 4:22 |
| 16. | "Whole Lotta Rosie" (live AC/DC cover) | Angus Young, Bon Scott, Malcolm Young | 3:53 |

== Personnel ==
Omen

- J.D. Kimball – vocals
- Kenny Powell – guitars
- Steve Wittig – drums
- Jody Henry – bass

Production

- Brian Slagel – production
- Eddy Schreyer – mastering
- Bill Metoyer – engineering
