= Nightmares (EP) =

EP by Omen
- Released: April 1987
- Genre: Heavy metal
- Length: 20:11
- Labels: Metal Blade (US); Roadrunner (Europe)
- Producer: Omen

Omen chronology
| The Curse (1986) | Nightmares (1987) | Escape to Nowhere (1988) |

Professional ratings
Review scores
| Source | Rating |
|---|---|
| AllMusic | 1.5/5 stars |
| Crash | 4–5/6 |

Nightmares is the first EP by American heavy metal band Omen. It was originally released in 1987 by Metal Blade. It was later included as bonus tracks on the 1989 re-issue of Warning of Danger and the 1996 re-issue of The Curse.

== Track listing ==
| No. | Title | Writer(s) | Length |
|---|---|---|---|
| 1. | "Nightmares" | | 2:48 |
| 2. | "Shock Treatment" | | 2:37 |
| 3. | "Dragon's Breath" | | 2:58 |
| 4. | "Termination" | J.D. Kimball, Kenny Powell | 3:30 |
| 5. | "Bounty Hunter" | | 4:22 |
| 6. | "Whole Lotta Rosie" (live AC/DC cover) | Angus Young, Bon Scott, Malcolm Young | 3:53 |

== Personnel ==
Omen

- J.D. Kimball - vocals
- Kenny Powell - guitars
- Steve Wittig - drums
- Jody Henry - bass

Production

- Omen - production
- Bill Metoyer - engineering
- Brian Slagel - executive production
- Eddy Schreyer - mastering
- Gerald McLaughlin - cover art
- Kevin Winter - photography
