= Battle Cry (Omen album) =

Studio album by Omen
- Released: October 1984
- Studio: Eldorado (Burbank, California)
- Genre: Heavy metal; power metal
- Length: 36:13
- Label: Metal Blade
- Producer: Brian Slagel

Omen chronology
Battle Cry (1984)	Warning of Danger (1985)

Professional ratings
Review scores
Source	Rating
AllMusic	4/5 stars
Metal Crypt (1)	4.5/5 stars
Metal Crypt (2)	5/5 stars
Metal Reviews	Classic
Metal Rules	4/5 stars
Metal Zone	100%
Rock Hard	8/10 stars

Battle Cry is the debut studio album by the American heavy metal band Omen, released in 1984 by Metal Blade Records. In 2005, Metal Blade re-released Battle Cry in Picture LP format, limited to 500 copies and including two bonus tracks.

The album's sound is reminiscient of English heavy metal band Iron Maiden, according to music pundits. The album's lyrics pertain to medieval topics. The album's themes are visualized on its hand-drawn cover artwork, which depicts ogres and warriors. Most music publications consider it to be the band's best album, and some have argued that it is underrated.

== Music and lyrics ==
The sound on Battle Cry has been described as "epic and earthy" by Metal Hammer. The album explores themes such as England in the Middle Ages, dragons, swordsmanship and supernatural magic. The album incorporates elements of thrash metal and NWOBHM, and the sound has drawn comparisons to Iron Maiden. The album employs staccato guitar riffs. The album incorporates the heavy metal gallop technique that has drawn comparisons to the bass guitar work of Steve Harris of Iron Maiden. According to Decibel, some of the album's material "threatens to go speed metal, but instead ends up back in a melodic, thespianic-trad sonic sphere." The album also contains anthemic choruses.

== Artwork ==
The album's cover artwork is hand-drawn. It has been described as looking "amateurish" by Metal Hammer. Loudwire likened it to the artwork of teenagers in the 1980s who attempted to mitigate "school boredom by decorating their notebooks with heavy metal band logos and sketches of ogres and warriors."

== Reception and impact ==
Battle Cry is generally considered to be the band's best album. In 2019, Metal Hammer ranked it as the 16th best power metal album of all time.

AllMusic gave the album four stars out of five, citing it as the most consistent release in the band's discography: "Many up-and-coming American metal bands of the early 1980s wished they were Iron Maiden, but few came as close to achieving the feat as Los Angeles' Omen. [...] For fans of classic American heavy metal looking for a guaranteed mid-'80s delight, there's little chance of a letdown from this release."

In 2017, Loudwire listed the album as among the greatest Metal Blade releases, and wrote: "You won’t find many finer, American-made Castle Metal albums than this underrated trove of fantasy-fueled headbangers."

In 2021, Greg Pratt of Decibel stated the opinion that the album was underrated, and was deserving of being regarded as a "household name" among readers of the publication:

"This one doesn't get mentioned quite as much as it should. Those in the know always give it a hefty horns up, yes, but the album should really be a bit more of a household name, at least in the sorts of households that Decibel readers live in, which are the sorts of places where sounds like this age like fine wine and are appreciated the way they should be: loud, and in reverence, and with a beer held high and a knowing smile on your headbanging face the entire time."

== Track listing ==
Original LP
No.	Title	Writer(s)	Length
1.	"Death Rider"	J.D. Kimball	3:26
2.	"The Axeman"	J.D. Kimball	4:25
3.	"Last Rites"	J.D. Kimball	3:39
4.	"Dragon's Breath"	J.D. Kimball, Jody Henry, Kenny Powell	2:59
5.	"Be My Wench"	J.D. Kimball	4:01
6.	"Battle Cry"	J.D. Kimball, Kenny Powell	3:41
7.	"Die by the Blade"	J.D. Kimball, Jody Henry, Kenny Powell	3:09
8.	"Prince of Darkness"	J.D. Kimball	2:44
9.	"Bring Out the Beast"	J.D. Kimball	4:08
10.	"In the Arena"	J.D. Kimball	4:00

2005 limited edition picture LP bonus tracks
No.	Title	Writer(s)	Length
11.	"Battle Cry" (live at San Antonio, Texas in 1986)	J.D. Kimball, Kenny Powell	3:25
12.	"Torture Me" (taken from Metal Massacre V)		4:02

== Personnel ==
Omen

- J.D. Kimball – vocals
- Kenny Powell – guitars, backing vocals
- Jody Henry – bass, backing vocals
- Steve Wittig – drums

Production

- Brian Slagel – production
- Ron Fair – engineering, mixing
- Bill Metoyer – engineering
- Scott Singer – engineering
- Carolyn Collins – assistant engineering
- Vince Gutierrez – cover art
