= List of people from Madrid =

This article is a list of notable people from Madrid, the capital of Spain:

== Born in ==
=== Architecture and urban planning ===
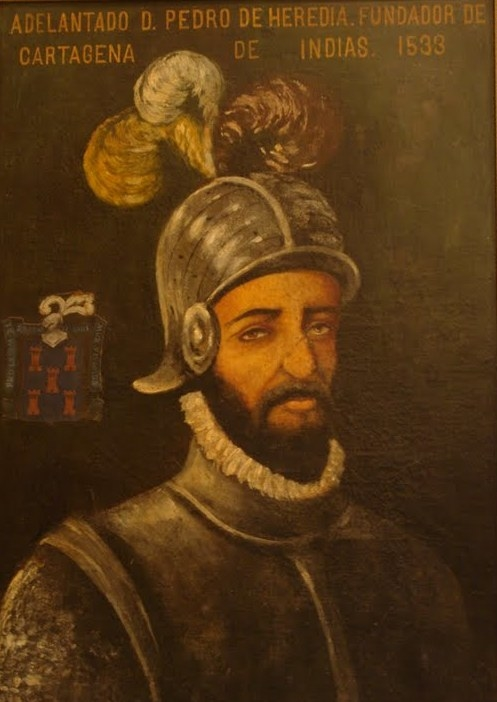
Pedro de Heredia

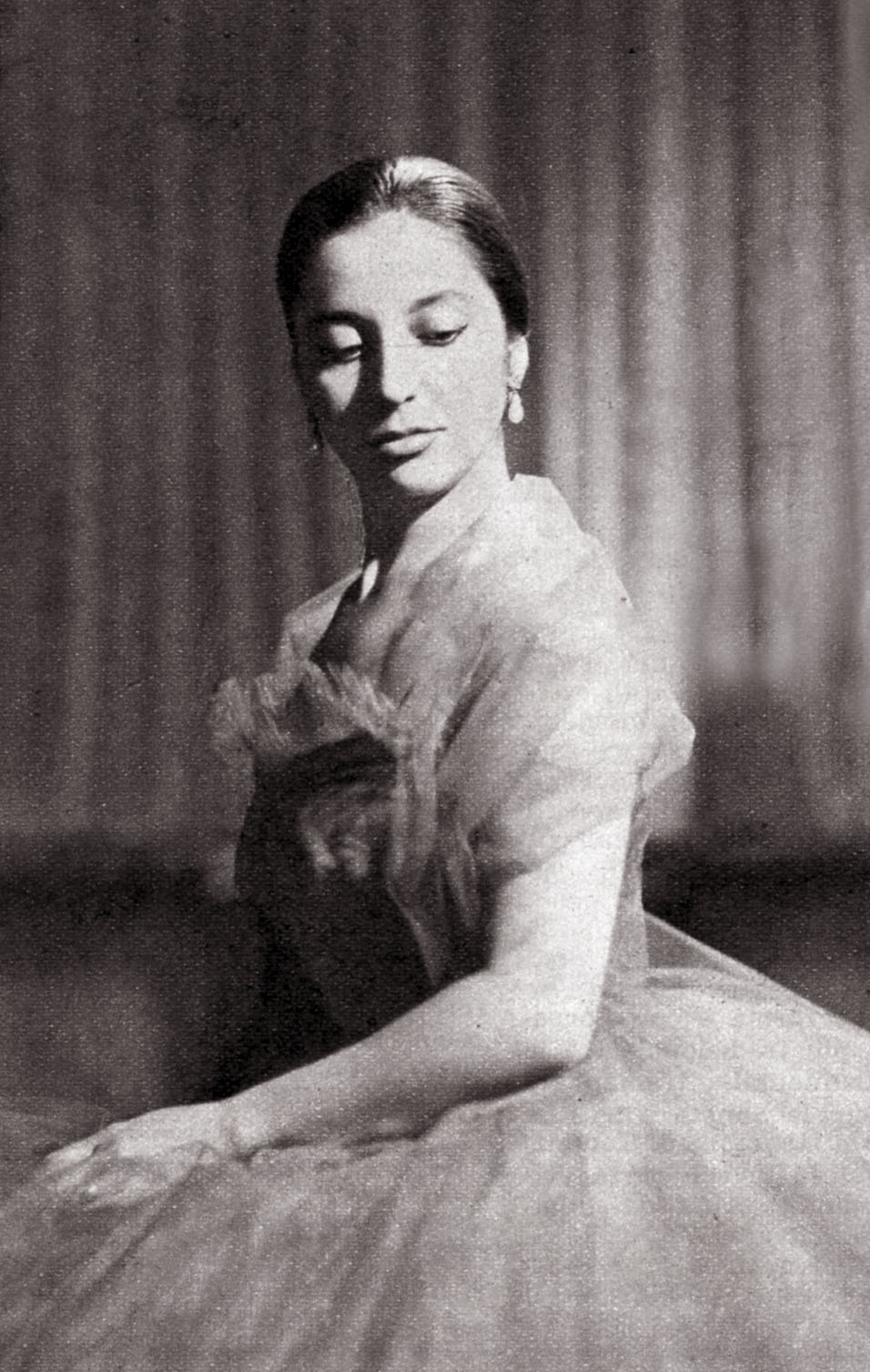
Teresa Berganza

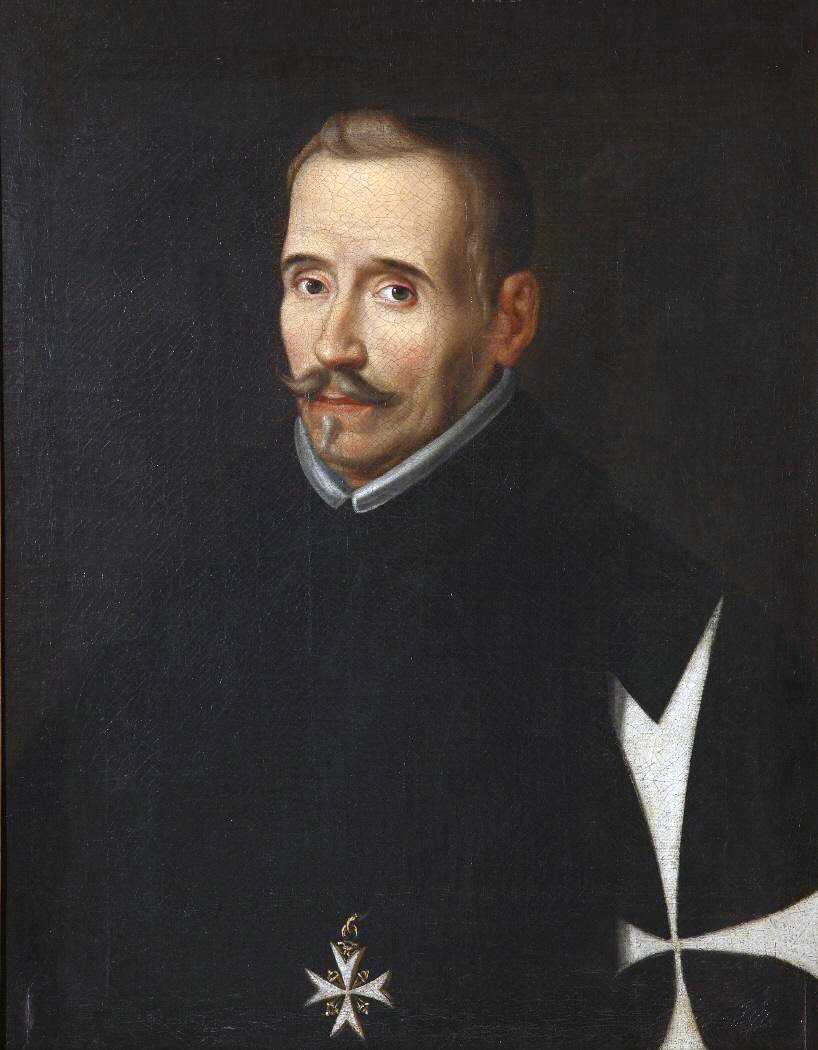
Félix Lope de Vega

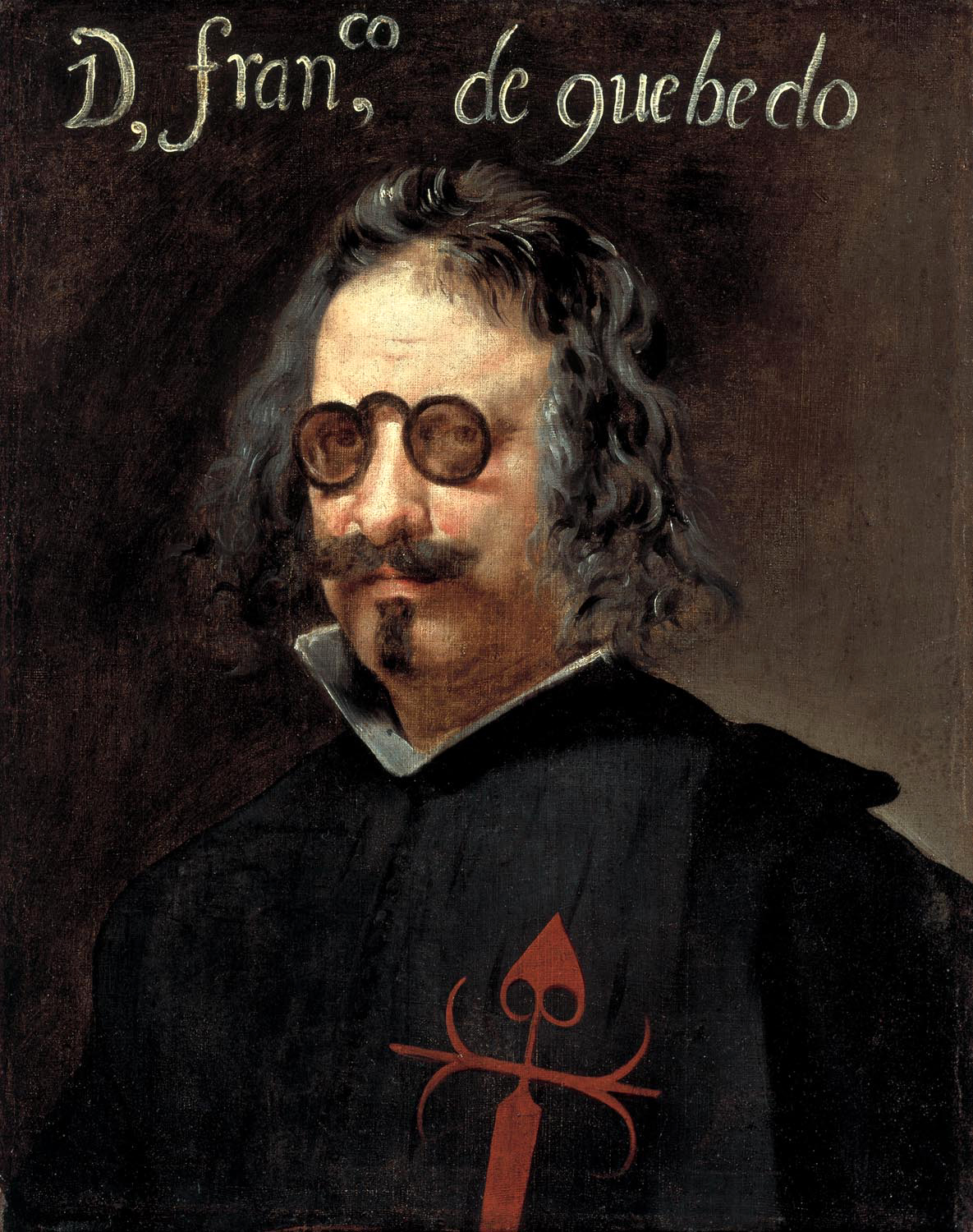
Francisco de Quevedo

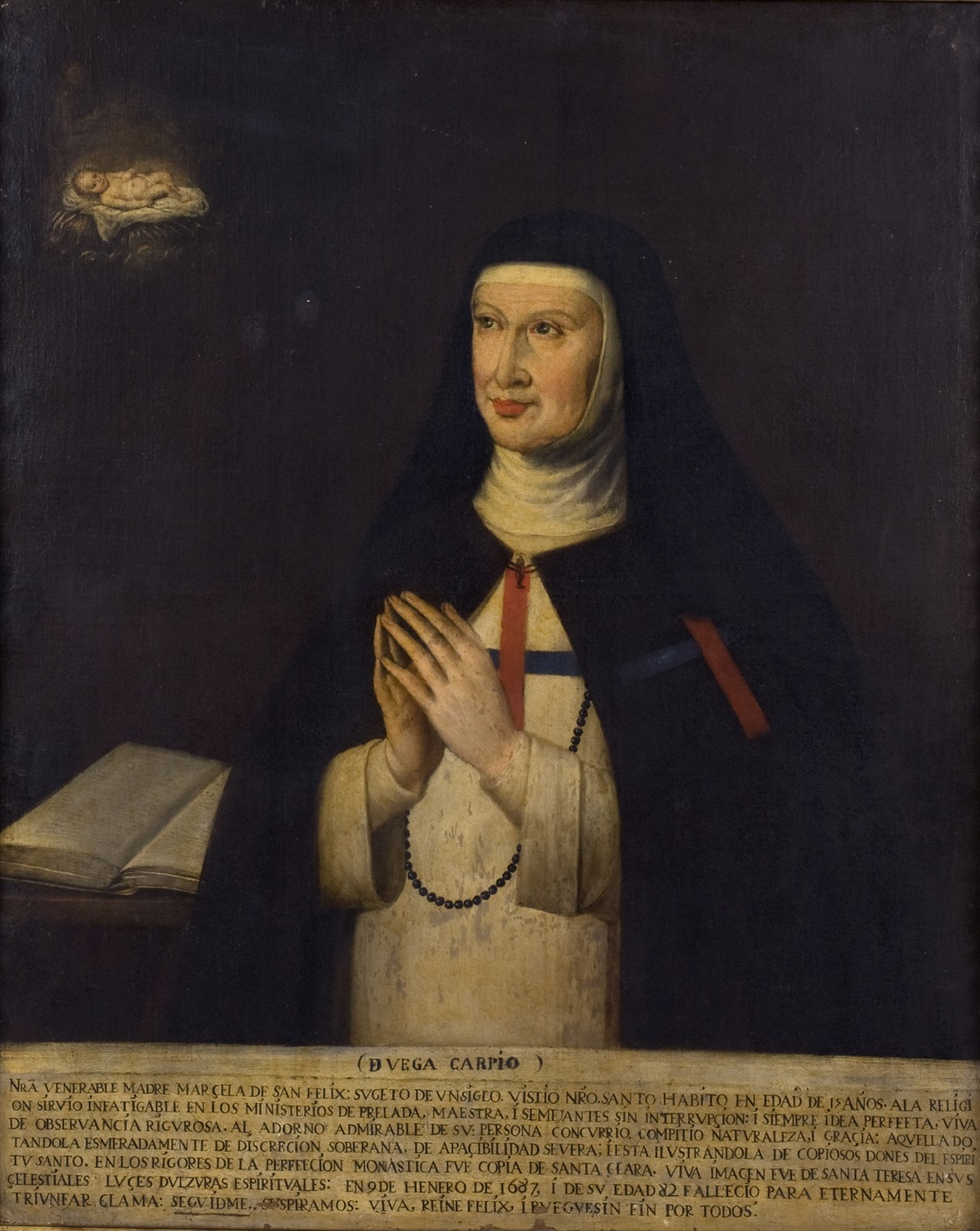
Sor Marcela de San Félix

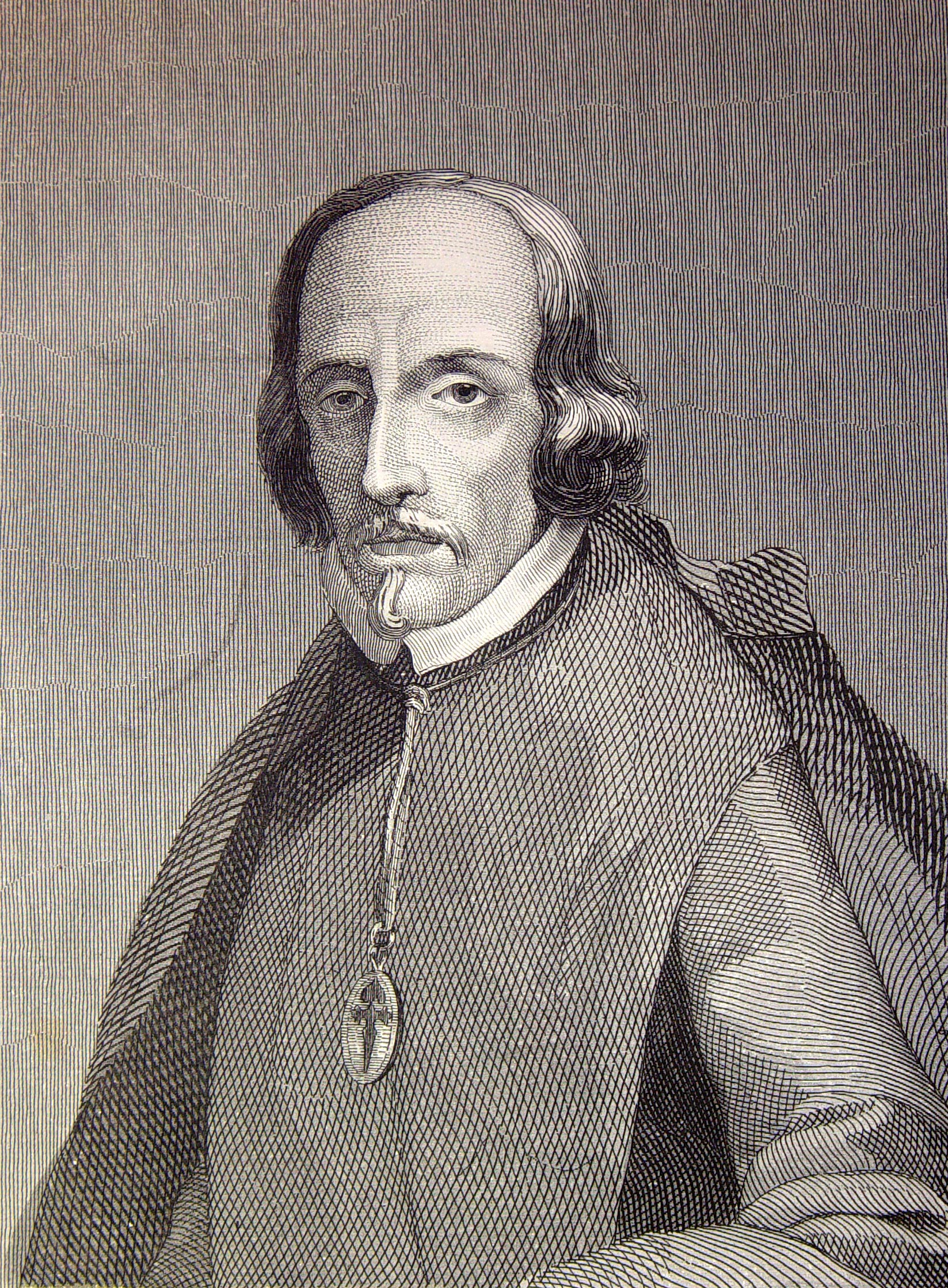
Pedro Calderón de la Barca

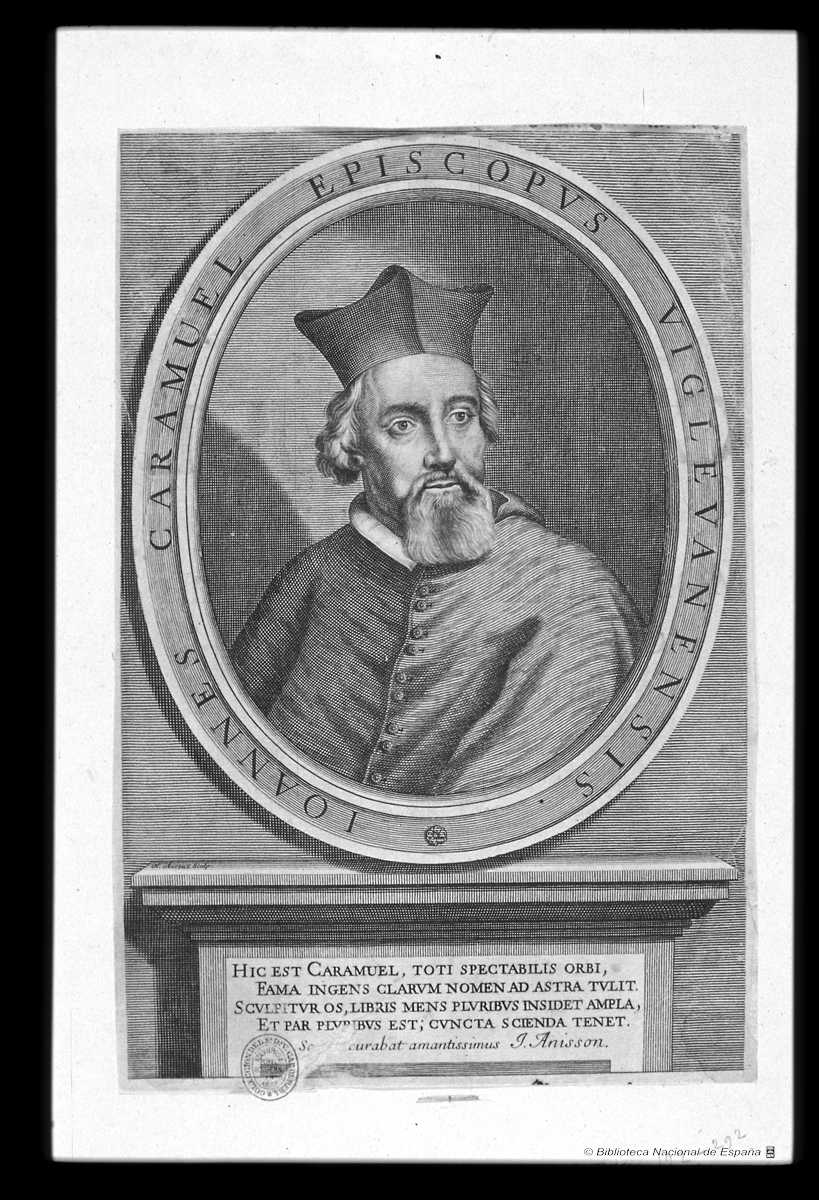
Juan Caramuel

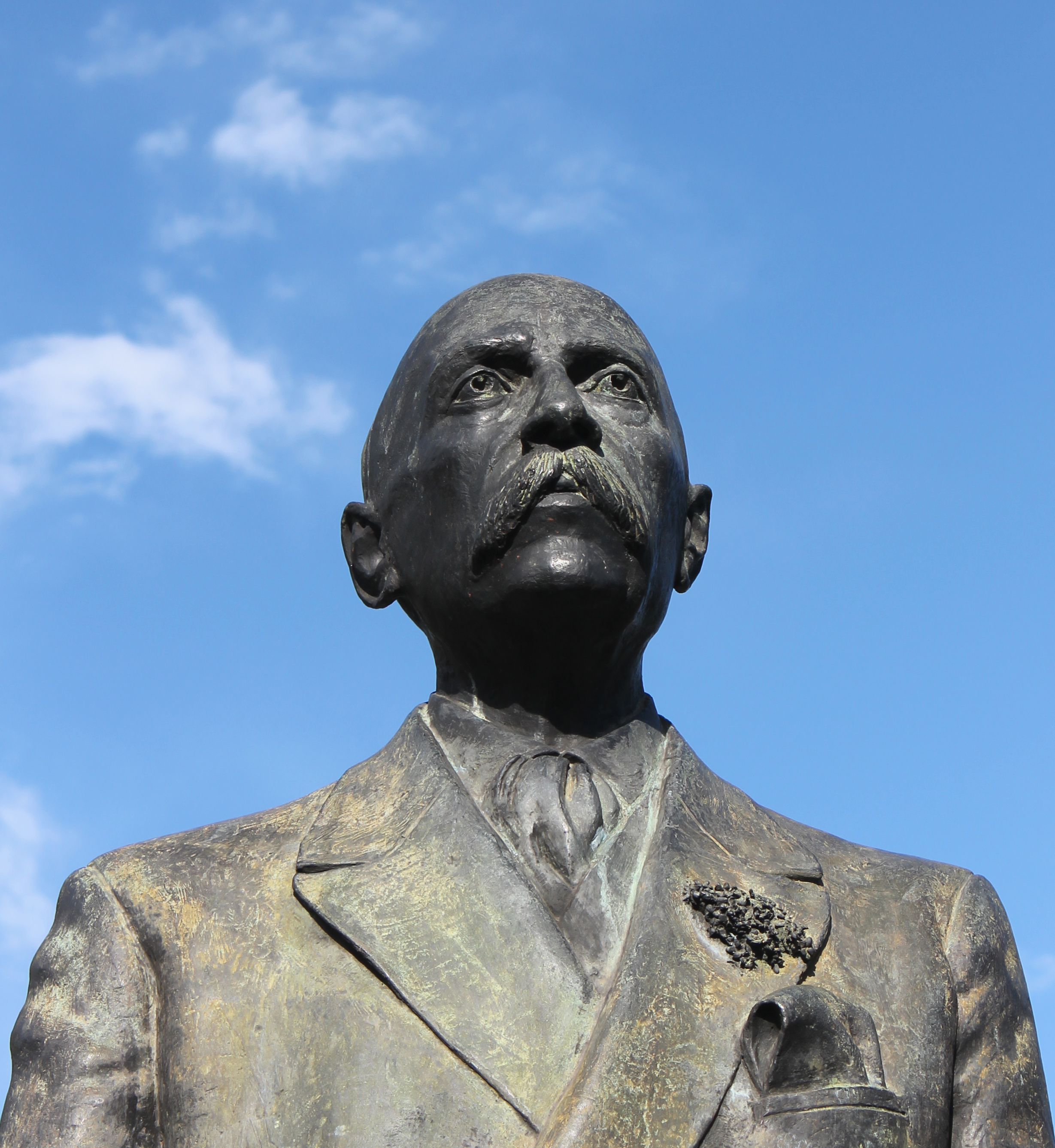
Arturo Soria

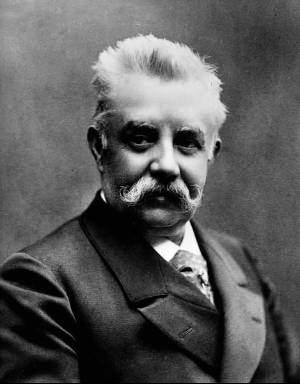
Federico Chueca

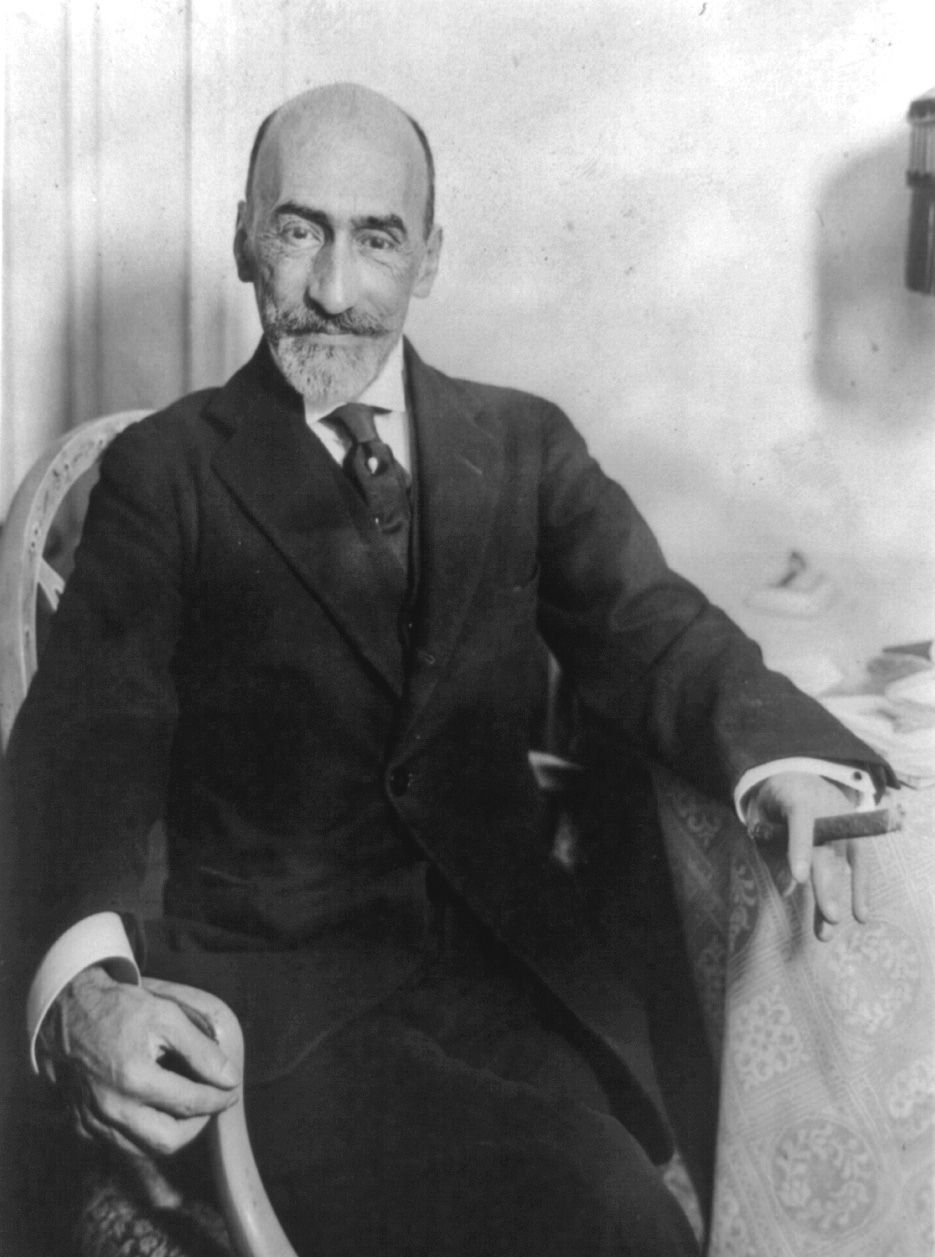
Jacinto Benavente

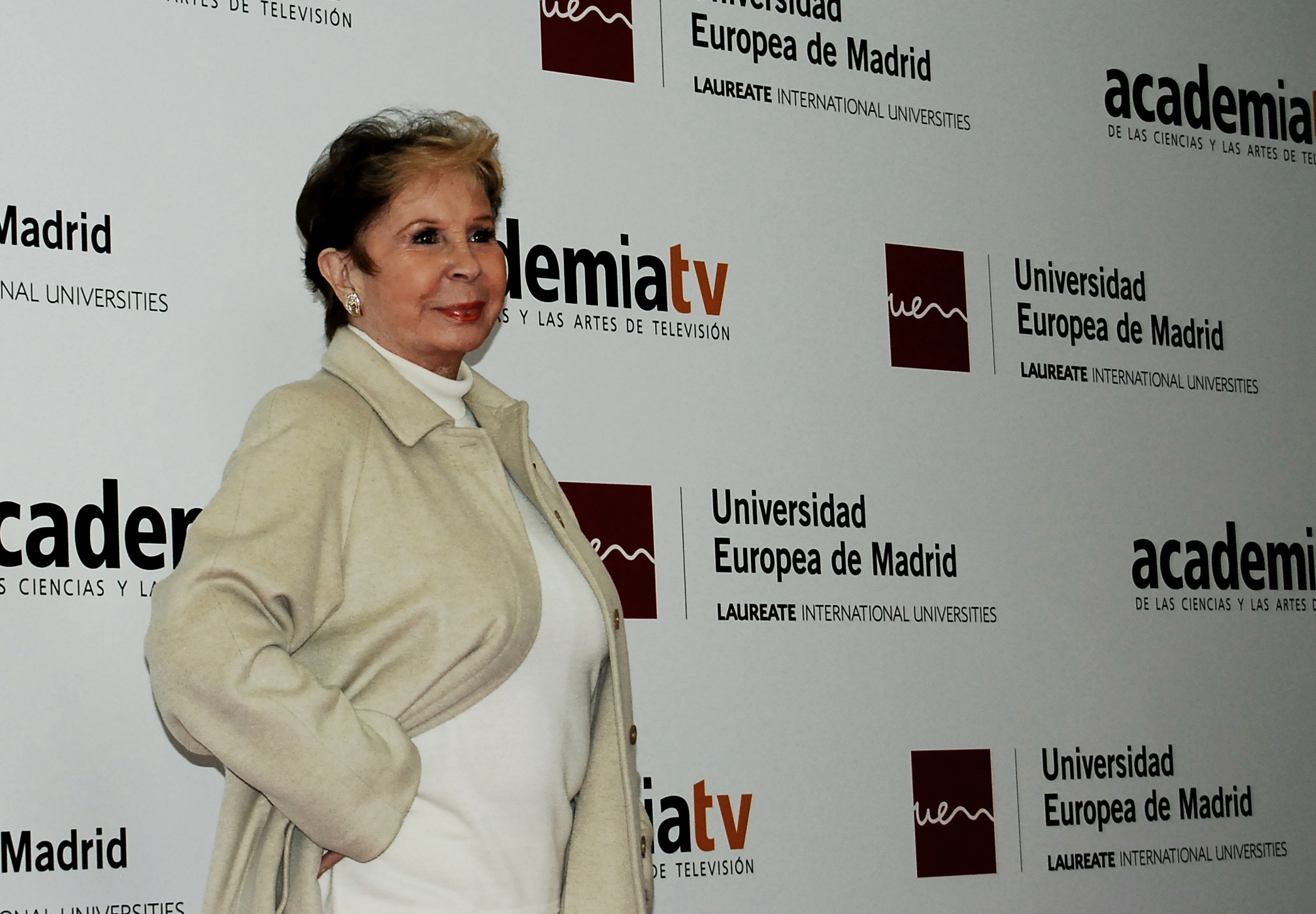
Lina Morgan

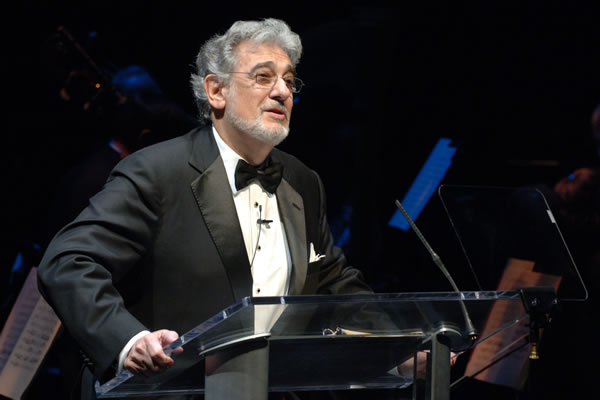
Plácido Domingo

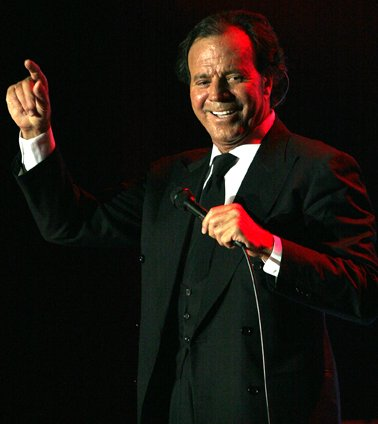
Julio Iglesias

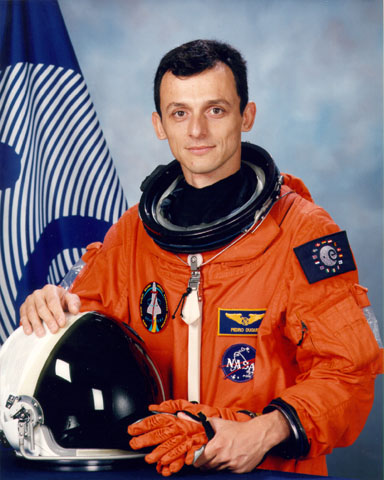
Pedro Duque

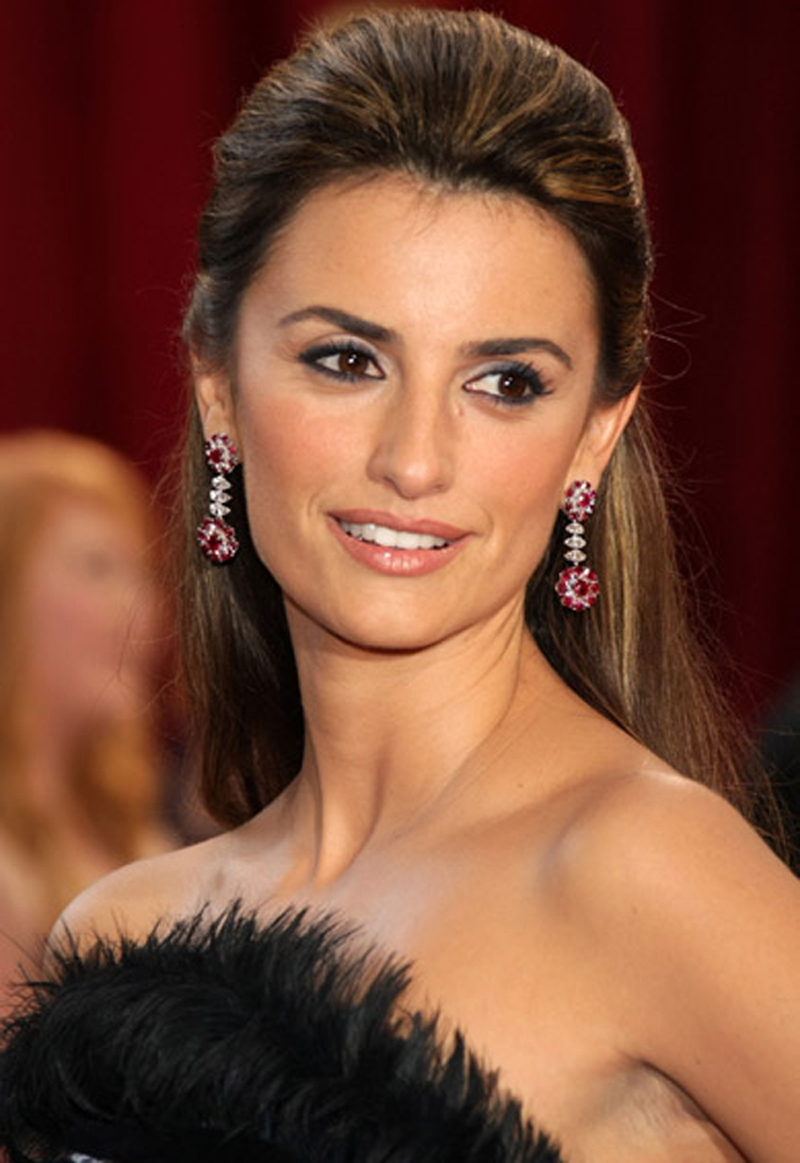
Penélope Cruz

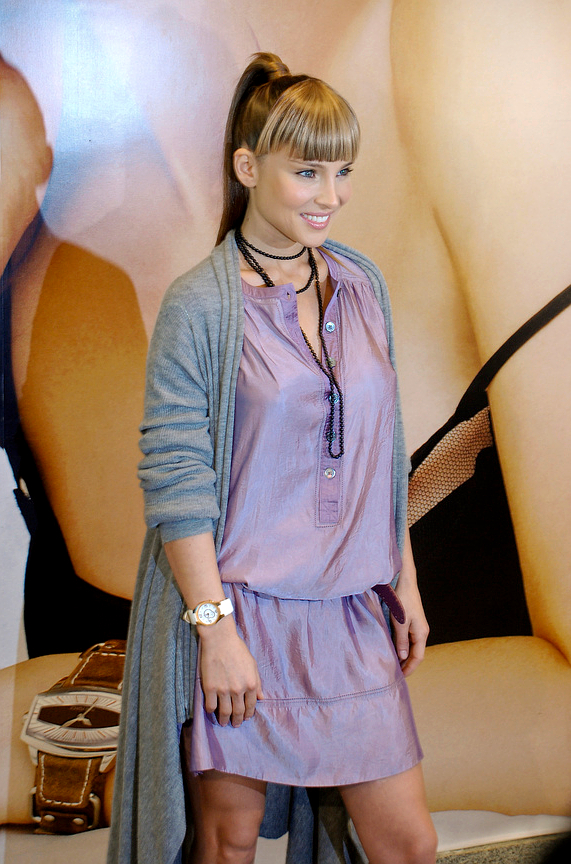
Elsa Pataky

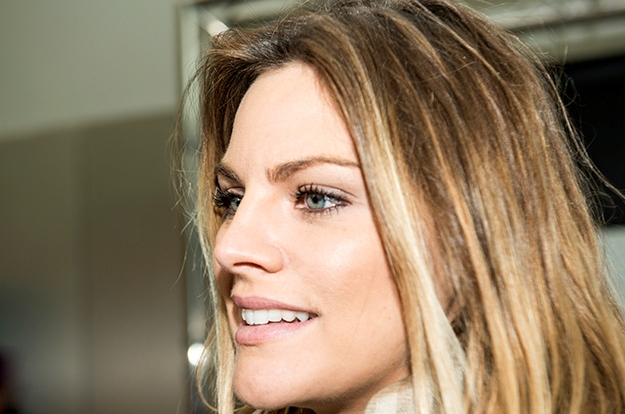
Amaia Salamanca

- Teodoro Ardemans (1664–1726): Spanish architect
- José Benito de Churriguera (1665–1725) and Churriguera family: Spanish Baroque architects and sculptors; the highly decorated Churrigueresque style of architectural construction is named after the family
- Juan de Villanueva (1739–1811): Spanish architect of Neoclassicism
- Arturo Soria (1844–1920): Spanish urban planner, well known for his concept of the linear city
- Leopoldo Torres Balbás (1888-1960): restorer, architect and scholar
- Eduardo Torroja (1899–1961): Spanish structural engineer and architect

=== Army ===
- Pedro de Heredia (1505 – c. 1554): Spanish conquistador and founder of Cartagena de Indias
- Alonso de Contreras (1582–1641): Spanish privateer, a friend of Lope de Vega

=== Art music ===
- Dionisio Aguado y García (1784–1849): Spanish classical guitarist and composer
- Francisco Asenjo Barbieri (1823–1894): Spanish composer of the popular Spanish opera form, the zarzuela
- Luisa Lacal de Bracho (1874–1962), Spanish pianist, musicologist, and writer
- Federico Chueca (1846–1908): Spanish composer of zarzuelas
- Conrado del Campo (1878–1953): composer, violinist and professor at the Madrid Conservatory
- Teresa Berganza (1935–2022): Spanish mezzo-soprano
- Plácido Domingo (1941): international tenor and conductor
- Miguel Álvarez-Fernández (1979): Spanish sound artist, composer, theorist and curator

=== Bullfighting ===
- Antonio Chenel Albadalejo (1932–2011): known as "Antoñete", Spanish bullfighter who had a long career
- Juana Cruz (1917–1981): Spanish bullfighter, one of the earliest women in the profession
- Luis Miguel Dominguín (1926–1996): Spanish bullfighter, a lover of Ava Gardner
- Julián López Escobar, El "Juli" (1982): Spanish bullfighter

=== Engineering ===
- Rafael del Pino (1920–2008): founder of the construction company Ferrovial
- Pedro Duque (1963): Spanish astronaut and aeronautical engineer

=== Finances ===
- Dimas Gimeno: former CEO of El Corte Inglés
- María Eugenia Girón: businesswoman
- Pablo Isla (1964): current chairman and CEO of Inditex
- Alicia Koplowitz (1954): Spanish noble and businesswoman
- Esther Koplowitz (1953): Spanish noble and businesswoman
- Juan Villalonga (1953): Spanish businessman

=== Formal sciences ===
- Juan Caramuel y Lobkowitz (1606–1682): Spanish Catholic scholastic philosopher, ecclesiastic, mathematician and writer

=== Literature ===
- Alonso de Ercilla (1533–1594): Spanish soldier and poet
- Félix Lope de Vega (1562–1635): Spanish Baroque playwright and poet; renewed the Spanish theatre at a time when it was starting to become a mass cultural phenomenon
- Tirso de Molina (1579–1648): Spanish Baroque playwright, poet, and Roman Catholic monk, known as the creator of Don Juan
- Francisco de Quevedo (1580–1645): Spanish nobleman, politician, and Baroque writer; his style is characterized by what was called conceptismo
- Pedro Calderon de la Barca (1600–1681): Spanish Baroque playwright and poet; his work is regarded as the culmination of the Spanish Baroque theatre
- Marcela de San Félix (1605–1688): poet, actress, and playwright
- Leandro Fernández de Moratín (1760–1828): Spanish playwright and poet
- Ramón de Mesonero Romanos (1803–1882): Spanish prose writer, author of Guía de Madrid (Madrid guide)
- Mariano José de Larra (1809–1837): Spanish Romantic writer and journalist
- José Echegaray (1832–1916): Spanish engineer, mathematician, and dramatist; Nobel Prize in Literature 1904
- Jacinto Benavente (1866–1954): Spanish dramatist, Nobel prize in Literature 1922
- Pedro Salinas (1891–1951): Spanish poet, member of the Generation of '27
- Gloria Zamacois (1897—1946), short story writer
- Dámaso Alonso (1898–1990): Spanish poet, philologist, and literary critic
- Enrique Jardiel Poncela (1901–1952): Spanish playwright and novelist who wrote mostly humorous works
- Liboria o "Borita Casas" Casas Regueiro (1911–1999): journalist, playwright, and author known for inventing the character Antoñita la Fantastica (Fantastic Antonia)
- Carlos Semprún (1926–2009): writer and dramatist
- Francisco Umbral (1932–2007): Spanish novelist, journalist, essayist and biographer
- Luzmaría Jiménez Faro (1937-2015): writer, essayist, anthologist, poet, and editor
- Pilar Adón (born 1971): Spanish writer and translator

=== Media and entertainment ===
- Hiba Abouk (born 1986): actress
- Jesús Álvarez (1926–1970): Spanish journalist and first anchorman of Telediario
- Jesús de Polanco (1929–2007): businessman; founder of El País and Cadena SER
- Belén Esteban (1973): Spanish television personality
- Alba Flores, (born 1986): actress
- Shaila Dúrcal (1979): singer songwriter
- Matías Prats Luque (1952): Spanish sports and news journalist
- Paloma García Ovejero (1975): Spanish journalist and news broadcaster
- El Gran Wyoming (1955): Spanish humourist and actor
- Ana Rosa Quintana (1956): Spanish journalist and TV presenter
- David Cantolla (1967): founder of companies engaged in technology and entertainment; one of the creators of Pocoyo
- Ana Pastor (1977): Spanish journalist and anchorwoman
- Santiago Ziesmer (1953): German voice actor
- Marian Rivera (born 1984): Filipino actress
- Plácido Domingo (born 1941): opera singer tenor and conductor

=== Natural sciences ===
- Maslama al-Majriti (10th century – 1007/1008): Muslim astronomer
- Andrés Manuel del Río (1764–1849): Spanish-Mexican scientist and naturalist
- Ignacio Bolívar (1850–1944): Spanish naturalist and entomologist
- Gonzalo Rodriguez Lafora (1886–1971): Spanish neurologist
- Gregorio Marañón (1887–1960): Spanish physician, scientist, historian, writer and philosopher
- Carlos Jiménez Díaz (1898–1967): Spanish physician
- Francisco J. Ayala (1934–2023): Spanish-American biologist and philosopher at the University of California, Irvine
- Antonio García-Bellido (1936): Spanish developmental biologist; his ideas and new approaches to the problem of development have been followed and pursued by many researchers worldwide
- Mariano Barbacid (1949): Spanish molecular biologist
- Juan Luis Arsuaga (1954): Spanish anthropologist; member of the research team investigating Pleistocene deposits in the Atapuerca Mountains

=== Philosophy ===
- Rocío Orsi (1976-2014): Spanish philosopher and professor
- José Ortega y Gasset (1883–1955): Spanish liberal philosopher

=== Politics ===
- Ruy Gonzáles de Clavijo (1370–1412): Castilian ambassador to the court of Timur
- Joanna la Beltraneja (1462–1530): Queen of Portugal and claimant to the throne of Castile
- Maria of Spain (1528–1603): spouse of Maximilian II, Holy Roman Emperor
- Antonio Perez (1540–1611): secretary of Philip II of Spain
- Philip III of Spain (1578–1621): Spanish Habsburg monarch
- Ferdinand VI of Spain (1713–1759): King of Spain
- Charles III of Spain (1716–1788): King of Spain, Naples (as Charles VII) and Sicily (as Charles V)
- Isabella II of Spain (1830–1904): Queen of Spain
- Alfonso XII of Spain (1857–1885): King of Spain
- Álvaro de Figueroa, 1st Count of Romanones (1863–1950): Prime Minister of Spain
- Francisco Largo (1869–1946): politician and trade unionist
- Julián Besteiro (1870–1940): socialist politician
- Tomás Dominguez: Carlist and Francoist politician
- Alfonso XIII of Spain (1886–1941): King of Spain
- Miguel Maura (1887–1971): politician
- Luis Jiménez (1889–1970): politician; president of Parliament
- José Antonio Primo de Rivera (1903–1936): Spanish lawyer, nobleman and politician; founder of Falange Española
- Adolfo Rincón de Arellano Garcia (1910–2006): politician
- Enrique Tierno Galván (1918–1986): Mayor of Madrid from 1978 to 1986
- Leopoldo Calvo-Sotelo (1926–2008): Spanish political figure and prime minister during the period of transition after the end of Francisco Franco's regime
- Javier Solana (1942): Spanish politician; appointed the High Representative of the Common Foreign and Security Policy of European Union and the Secretary-General of the Council of the European Union
- Boti García Rodrigo (1945): Spanish LGBTI activist and the General Directorate of Sexual Diversity and LGBTI rights (2020–2023)
- Rodrigo Rato (1949): managing director of the International Monetary Fund (IMF) from 2004 to 2007
- Esperanza Aguirre (1952): 3rd President of Madrid (2003–2012) and former president of the Spanish Senate (1999–2012)
- José María Aznar (1952): Prime Minister of Spain from 1996 to 2004
- Alberto Ruiz-Gallardón (1958): former Minister of Justice; former Mayor of Madrid (2003–2011)
- Philip VI of Spain (1968): current king of Spain
- Pablo Iglesias Turrión (1978): Spanish political scientist and leader of Podemos

=== Popular music ===
- María Dolores Pradera (1924–2018): Spanish singer and actress
- Fina de Calderón (1927–2010): Spanish writer, poet, songwriter and musician
- Julio Iglesias (1943): Spanish singer-songwriter who has sold over 300 million records worldwide
- Rocío Durcal (1944–2006): Spanish singer and actress
- Massiel (1947): Spanish pop singer; winner of the Eurovision Song Contest 1968
- Rosendo Mercado (born 1954): rock singer and songwriter
- Antonio Vega (1957–2009): Spanish pop singer-songwriter; member of Nacha Pop
- Antonio Flores (1961–1995): Spanish singer-songwriter and actor
- Alejandro Sanz (1968): Spanish singer-songwriter and musician
- Los Chichos (1973–1995, 1990–2008): Spanish rumba band
- Enrique Iglesias (1975): Spanish singer-songwriter, model, and actor
- Barón Rojo (1980): Spanish heavy metal band
- Mecano (1981–1992): Spanish pop band
- Hombres G (1982–1992; 2002–present): Spanish pop-rock band
- Mägo de Oz (1988): Spanish rock and folk/heavy metal band
- Belinda (1989): Mexican singer-songwriter and actress
- Quevedo (born 2001): rapper

=== Religion ===
- Saint Isidro Labrador (1070–1130): Catholic patron saint of farmers and Madrid
- Juan Eusebio Nieremberg (1595–1658): Spanish Jesuit and mystic
- Álvaro del Portillo (1914–1992): former prelate of the Opus Dei

=== Scenic arts ===
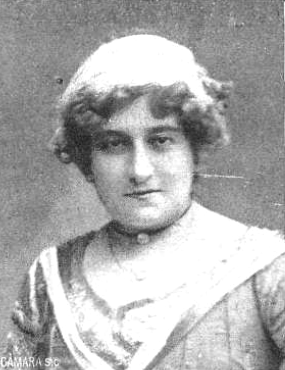
- María Guerrero
  María Calderón, "La Calderona" (1611–1646): Spanish theatre actress and lover of Philip IV of Spain
- María Guerrero (1867–1928): Spanish theatre actress, producer and director
- Edgar Neville (1899–1967): Spanish playwright and film director, member of the Generation of '27
- Antonio Castillo (1908–1984): Academy Award winning costume designer
- Juan Antonio Bardem (1922–2002): Spanish screenwriter and film director
- César Fernández Ardavín (1923–2012): Spanish film director and screenwriter; won the Golden Bear at the 10th Berlin International Film Festival
- Lina Morgan (1936–2015): Spanish actress and comedienne
- José Luis Garci (1944): Spanish director, won the Academy Award for Best Foreign Language Film in 1982
- Carmen Maura (1945): Spanish actress; has collaborated with Pedro Almodóvar in several times
- Emilio Martínez Lázaro (1945): Spanish film director; shared a Golden Bear at the 28th Berlin International Film Festival
- María Kosti (1951): Spanish actress
- Fernando Trueba (1955): Spanish director; won the Academy Award for Best Foreign Language Film in 1994
- Belén Rueda (1962): Spanish actress, known for her roles as Julia in The Sea Inside (2004) and as Laura in The Orphanage (2007)
- Santiago Segura (1965): Spanish film actor, screenwriter, producer and director
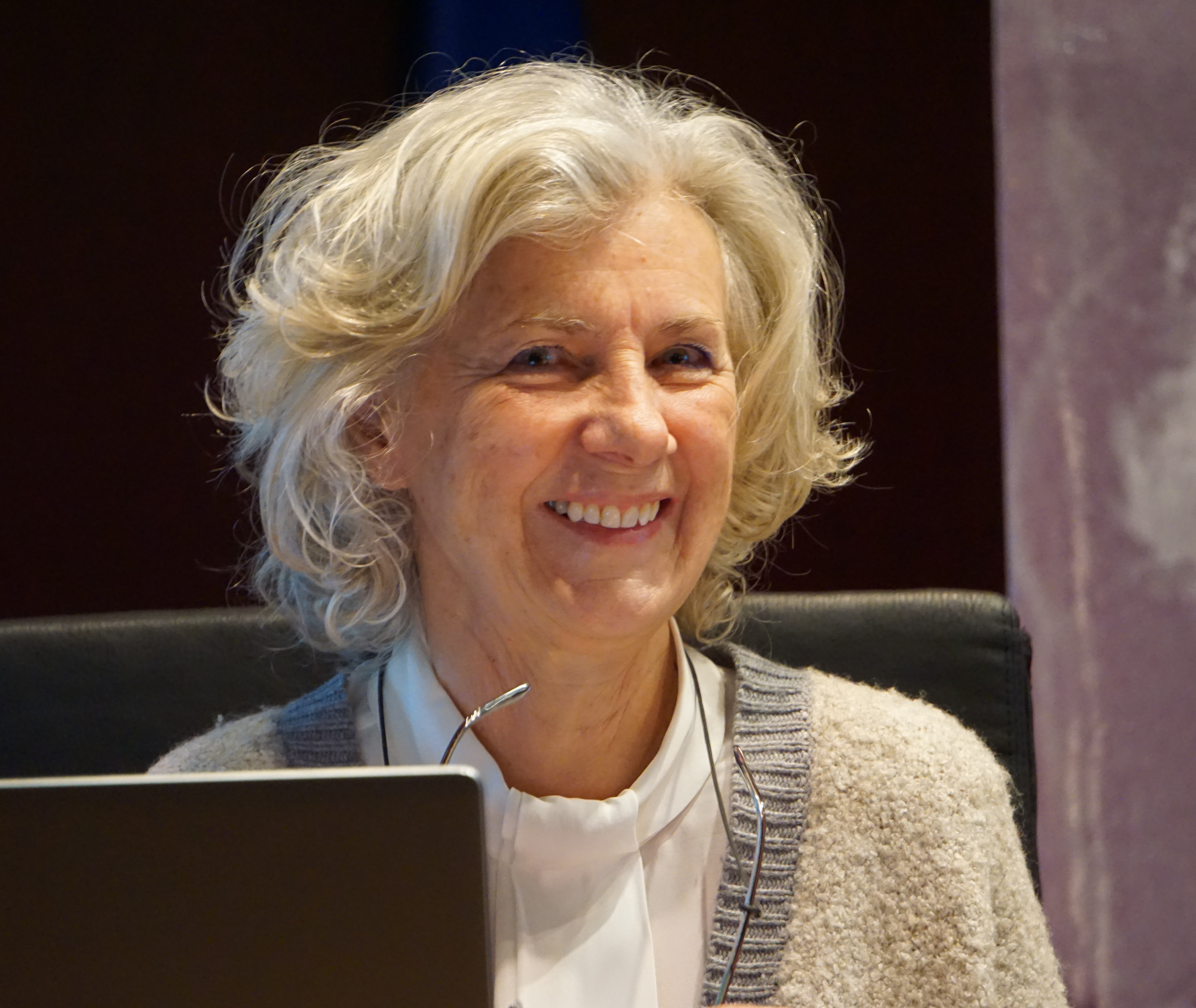
  Mercedes Bengoechea
- Maribel Verdú (1970): Spanish actress
- Elsa Pataky (1976): Spanish and Australian actress and model
- Francisco Ortiz (1986): Spanish actor
- Amarna Miller (1990): Spanish actress
- Nathalia Ramos (1992): Spanish and American actress; born/lived in Madrid for two years

=== Social sciences ===
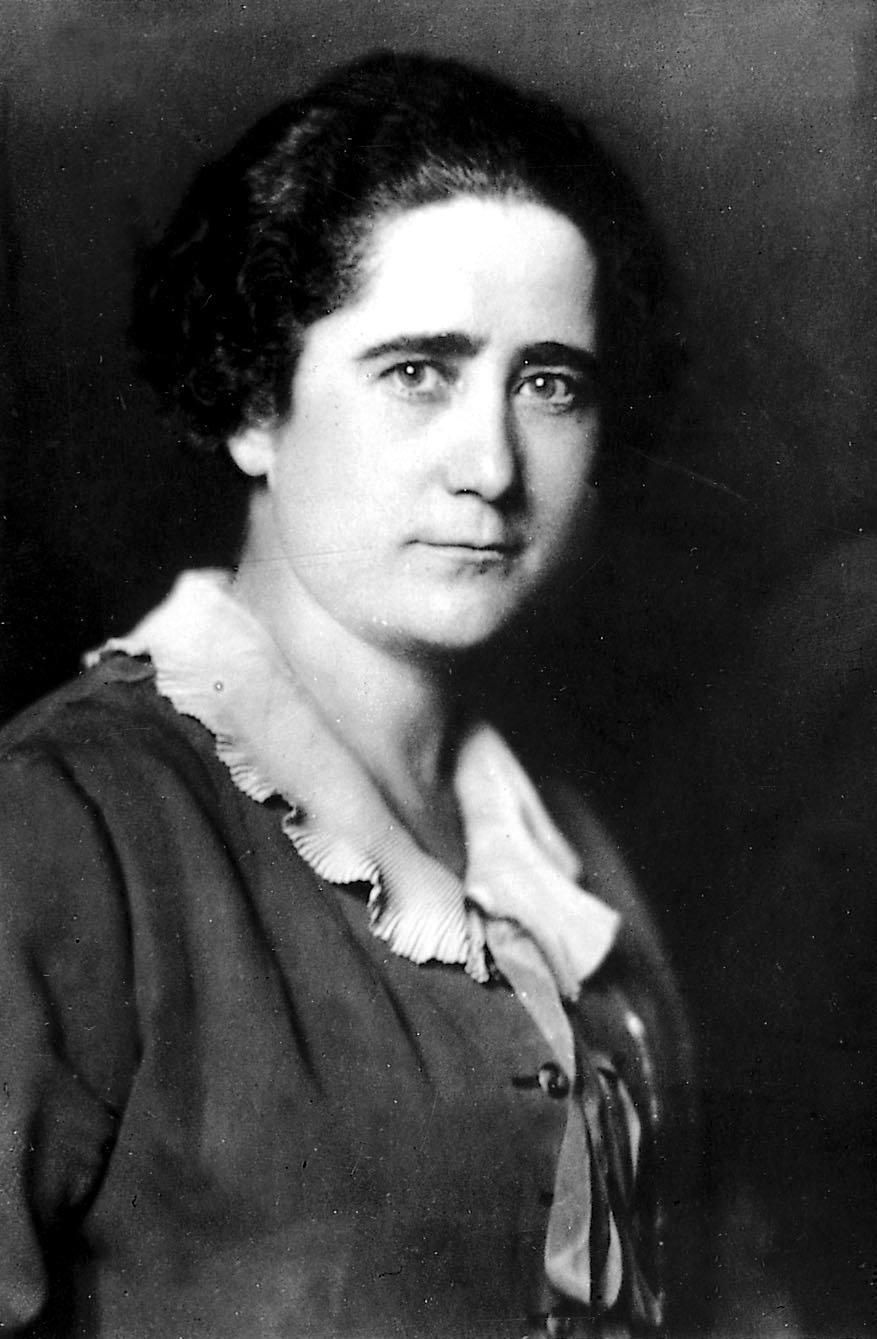
Clara Campoamor

- Mercedes Bengoechea (1952): feminist sociolinguist, professor
- Margarita María Birriel Salcedo (1953): professor, expert in women's history and women's studies
- Clara Campoamor (1888–1972): politician, lawyer, writer, mother of the Spanish feminist movement
- María Goyri (1873–1954): literary critic, researcher, educator, advocate for women's rights
- Juan Lopez de Hoyos (1511–1583): Spanish schoolmaster and Miguel de Cervantes' teacher
- Claudio Sánchez Albornoz (1893–1984): Spanish historian
- Manuel Tuñón de Lara (1915–1987): Spanish historian
- Pio Filippani Ronconi (1920–2010): Italian orientalist
- Jesús Huerta de Soto (1956): economist

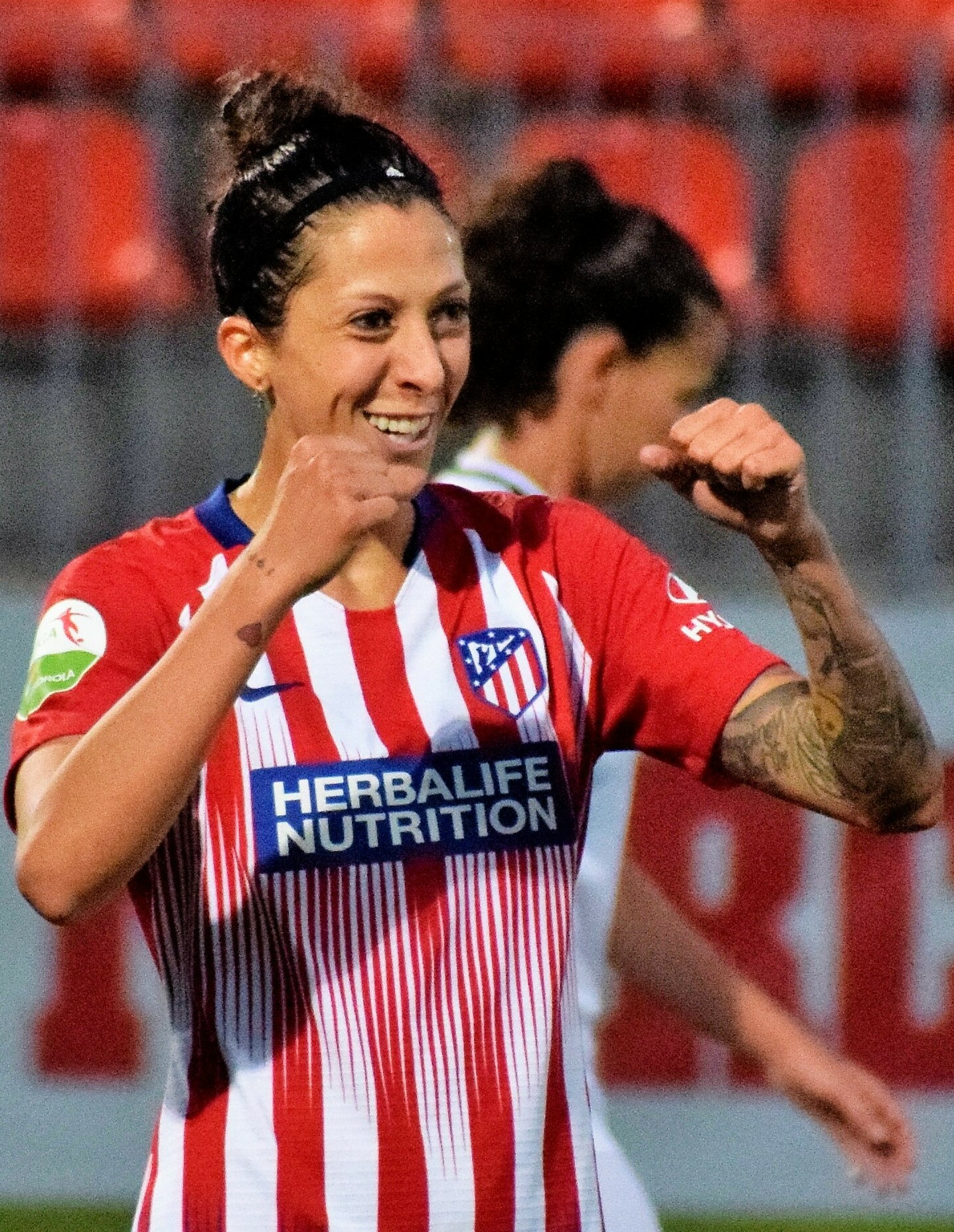
Jenni Hermoso

=== Sports ===
- Antonio Rebollo (1955): Paralympic archery
- José Navarro Morenés (1897–1974): Spanish horse rider
- Luis González Maté (1931): retired Spanish boxer
- Luis Aragonés (1938–2014): former Spanish footballer and national coach
- Manolo Santana (1938–2021): former amateur tennis champion
- Florentino Pérez (1947): Spanish businessman, civil engineer, former politician; current president of Real Madrid C.F., and Grupo ACS
- Begoña Gómez Martín (1964): Olympic judoka
- Carlos Sainz (1962): Spanish rally driver
- Fernando Martín Espina (1962–1989): Spanish basketball player
- Emilio Butragueño (1963): Spanish retired footballer
- Pedro García Aguado (1968): former water polo player; current psychologist
- Jesús Ángel García (1969): Spanish race walker
- Mario Gimeno (1969): Spanish retired footballer
- Rafael Pascual, "El Toro" (1970): Spanish volleyball player
- Raúl González (1977): professional football player
- Estela Giménez (1979): retired rhythmic gymnast
- Gonzalo Fernández-Castaño (1980): professional golfer
- Alberto Falcón (1970): former professional fencer
- Gabi Fernández (1983): professional footballer
- Fernando Verdasco (1983): professional tennis player
- Coke Andújar (1987): professional footballer
- Jenni Hermoso (1990): professional footballer for the Spain national team
- Claudia Zornoza (1990): professional footballer for the Spain national team
- David De Gea (1990): professional football player
- Javier Fernández López (1991): professional figure skater, 2018 Olympic games bronze medalist, double world champion (2015, 2016), 7-times European champion.
- Koke Resurrección (1992): professional footballer
- Adrián Mateos (1994): professional poker player
- Carlos Sainz Jr. (1994): Spanish Formula One racing driver
- Jesús de Miguel (1996-2026): Professional football player
- David Alonso (2006): Moto3 Racer
- Vicky López (born 2006): footballer for the Spain national team
- Paula Comendador (born 2007), footballer

=== Visual arts ===
- Sebastián Herrera Barnuevo (1611–1616): Spanish painter, architect and sculptor
- Francisco Camilo (1615–1673): Spanish Baroque painter
- Francisco Rizi (1608–1615): Spanish Baroque painter
- Claudio Coello (1642–1693): Spanish Baroque painter
- Eduardo Rosales (1836–1873): Spanish realist painter
- José Gutiérrez Solana (1886–1945): Spanish expressionist painter and printmaker
- Juan Gris (1887–1927): international artist of Cubism
- Lucio Muñoz (1929–1998): Spanish abstract painter and engraver
- Eduardo Arroyo (1937–2018): Spanish painter and graphic artist
- Juan Muñoz (1953–2001): Spanish sculptor, working primarily in papier-mâché, resin and bronze
- Ouka Leele (1957–2022): Spanish photographer
- Chema Madoz (1958): Spanish photographer, best known for his black and white surrealist photography
- Muelle (1966–1995): Spanish graffiti pioneer
- Arturo Berned (1966): Spanish sculptor

=== Others ===
- María Cayetana de Silva (1762–1802): 13th Duchess of Alba
- Manuela Malasaña (1791–1808): one of the townspeople who lost their lives during the Dos de Mayo Uprising against the troops of Napoleon I of France during the Peninsular War
- Enma Iranzo Martín (1959): pharmaceutical biochemist and Spanish politician
- Agatha Ruiz de la Prada (1960): Spanish designer
- Victoria Zárate Zurita (1893–1964): teacher and trade unionist

== Other influential people who have lived in Madrid ==
=== Architecture and urban planning ===
- Juan de Herrera (1530–1597): Spanish architect, mathematician and geometrician
- Filippo Juvarra (1678–1736): Italian architect and stage set designer
- Ventura Rodríguez (1717–1785): Spanish architect and artist
- Francesco Sabatini (1722–1897): Italian architect
- Antonio Palacios (1872–1945): Spanish architect

=== Army ===
- Don John of Austria (1545–1578): illegitimate son of Holy Roman Emperor Charles V, best known for his victory at the Battle of Lepanto

=== Engineering ===
- Leonardo Torres y Quevedo (1852–1936): Spanish civil engineer and mathematician

=== Finances ===
- Emilio Botín (1934–2014): Spanish banker; former Executive Chairman of Spain's Grupo Santander

=== Formal sciences ===
- Grégoire de Saint-Vincent (1584–1667): Flemish Jesuit mathematician
- Jean-Charles de la Faille (1597–1652): Flemish Jesuit mathematician
- Johann Baptist Cysat (1587–1657): Swiss Jesuit mathematician and astronomer
- Hugh Sempill (between 1589 and 1596 – 1654): Scottish Jesuit mathematician and linguist

=== Literature ===
- Miguel de Cervantes (1547–1616): Spanish novelist, poet and playwright; soldier; his magnum opus, Don Quixote, is the first modern European novel
- Luis de Góngora (1561–1627): Spanish Baroque lyric poet
- Manuel de Faria e Sousa (1590–1649): Portuguese poet and historian
- Miguel Unamuno (1864–1936): Spanish essayist, novelist, poet, playwright, philosopher; Greek professor and later rector at the University of Salamanca
- Pío Baroja (1872–1956): Spanish Basque writer, one of the key novelists of the Generation of '98
- Vicente Aleixandre (1889–1984): Spanish poet, Nobel Prize in Literature 1977
- Federico García Lorca (1898–1936): Spanish poet, dramatist and theatre director
- Ernest Hemingway (1899–1961): American author and journalist
- Camilo José Cela (1916–2002): Spanish novelist and short story writer, Nobel Prize in Literature 1989
- Mario Vargas Llosa (1936): Peruvian-Spanish writer, politician, journalist, essayist, and recipient of the 2010 Nobel Prize in Literature

=== Media and entertainment ===
- Matías Prats Cañete (1913–2004): Spanish radio and television journalist

=== Music ===
- Domenico Scarlatti (1685–1757): Italian composer; spent much of his life in the service of the Portuguese and Spanish royal families
- Luigi Boccherini (1743–1805): Italian classical era composer
- Tomás Bretón (1850–1923): Spanish musician and composer of zarzuelas
- Lola Flores (1923–1995): Spanish singer, dancer and actress
- Joaquín Sabina (1949): Spanish singer-songwriter, and poet
- José Antonio Bowen (born 1952): American jazz musician and president of Goucher College
- Nacho Canut (1957): bass player and one of the main composers (along with Alaska) of the bands Alaska y los Pegamoides, Alaska y Dinarama and Fangoria
- Loquillo (1960): Spanish rock singer and founder of Loquillo y Trogloditas
- Alaska (1963): Spanish-Mexican singer, DJ, and TV personality; one of the main characters in the so-called Movida
- Shakira (1977): Colombian singer-songwriter, dancer and model
- Sharon Corr (1970): Irish singer-songwriter, musician and television personality, member of The Corrs

=== Natural sciences ===
- Alexius Sylvius Polonus (1593–1653): Polish Jesuit astronomer and maker of astronomical instruments
- Santiago Ramón y Cajal (1852–1934): Spanish pathologist, histologist, neuroscientist, and Nobel laureate (1906)
- Severo Ochoa (1905–1933): Spanish–American Doctor of Medicine and Biochemist, and joint winner of the 1959 Nobel Prize in Physiology or Medicine

=== Philosophy ===
- Baltasar Gracián (1601–1658): Spanish Jesuit and baroque prose writer and philosopher; his proto-existentialist writings were lauded by Nietzsche and Schopenhauer
- María Zambrano (1904–1991): Spanish essayist and philosopher

=== Politics ===
- Philip II of Spain (1527–1598): Habsburg King of Spain and Portugal; during his reign, Spain reached the height of its influence and power
- Count-Duke of Olivares (1587–1645): Spanish royal favourite of Philip IV; minister
- Philip IV of Spain (1605–1665): King of Spain and Portugal (as Philip III)
- Philip V of Spain (1683–1743): first Spanish King of the House of Bourbon
- Elizabeth Farnese (1692–1766): Queen of Spain as the wife of King Philip V, and de facto ruler of Spain from 1714 until 1746
- Joseph Bonaparte (1768–1844): elder brother of Napoleon Bonaparte, King of Spain (1808–1813, as José I)
- Simón Bolivar (1783–1830): Venezuelan military and political leader; played a key role in Hispanic America's successful struggle for independence from the Spanish Empire
- Ferdinand VII of Spain (1784–1833): Spanish monarch
- Baldomero Espartero (1793–1879): Spanish general and political figure; associated with the radical (or progressive) wing of Spanish liberalism and would become their symbol and champion after taking credit for the victory over the Carlists in 1839
- Leopoldo O'Donnell (1808–1867): Spanish general and statesman
- Francisco Pi y Margall (1824–1901): liberal Spanish statesman and romanticist writer; was briefly president of the short-lived First Spanish Republic in 1873
- Práxedes Mateo Sagasta (1825–1903): Prime Minister of Spain during the Spanish–American War of 1898 (during which time Spain lost its remaining colonies), and founder of the Liberal Party
- Antonio Cánovas del Castillo (1828–1897): Spanish politician and historian, known principally for serving six terms as Spanish Prime Minister
- Emilio Castelar y Ripoll (1832–1899): Spanish republican politician, and a president of the First Spanish Republic
- Amadeo I of Spain (1845–1890): the only King of Spain from the House of Savoy
- José Rizal (1861–1896): Filipino nationalist and revolutionary
- Francisco Franco (1892–1975): Spanish dictator from 1939 to 1975
- Pablo Iglesias (1887–1927): Spanish socialist and labour leader, founder of the Spanish Socialist Workers' Party (PSOE) and the Spanish General Worker's Union (UGT)
- Manuel Azaña (1880–1940): first Prime Minister of the Second Spanish Republic (1931–1933)
- Juan Perón (1895–1974): Argentine military officer and politician
- Carlos Lopez-Cantera (1973): Lieutenant Governor of the U.S. State of Florida (2014–2019)
- Santiago Carrillo (1915–2012): general secretary of the Communist Party of Spain (PCE) from 1960 to 1981
- Manuel Fraga Iribarne (1922–2012): Spanish People's Party politician
- Adolfo Suárez (1932-2014): Spain's first democratically elected prime minister after the dictatorship of Francisco Franco, and the key figure in the country's transition to democracy
- Simeon II of Bulgaria (1937): important political and royal figure in Bulgaria
- Juan Carlos I of Spain (1938): King of Spain from 1975 to 2014
- Queen Sofía of Spain (1938): Queen consort and wife of King Juan Carlos I of Spain
- Felipe González (1942): Prime Minister of Spain, after having served four successive mandates from 1982 to 1996
- Josep Antoni Duran i Lleida (1952): Minister of Governance and Institutional Relations of the Generalitat de Catalunya
- Mariano Rajoy (1955): current Prime Minister of Spain, elected on 21 December 2011
- José Luis Rodríguez Zapatero (1960): Prime Minister of Spain from 2004 to 2011

=== Religion ===
- Josemaría Escrivá (1902–1975): Roman Catholic priest from Spain and founder of Opus Dei

=== Scenic arts ===
- Luis Buñuel (1900–1983): Aragonese filmmaker who worked in Spain, Mexico and France
- Fernando Fernán Gómez (1921–2007): Spanish actor, screenwriter, film director, theater director and member of the Royal Spanish Academy
- Sara Montiel (1928–2013): Spanish singer and actress
- Alfredo Landa (1933–2013): Spanish actor; winner of Best Actor Award (Cannes Film Festival 1984)
- Pedro Almodóvar (1949): Spanish film director, screenwriter and producer; member of the American Academy of Arts and Sciences since 2001
- Javier Bardem (1969): Spanish actor; won the Academy Award for Best Supporting Actor in 2007
- Alejandro Amenábar (1972): Chilean-Spanish film director, screenwriter and composer; won the Academy Award for Best Foreign Language Film in 2005

=== Social sciences ===
- Beatriz Galindo, "La Latina" (1465?–1534): Spanish physician and educator; writer, humanist and a teacher of Queen Isabella of Castile and her children
- Francisco Giner de los Ríos (1839–1915): Spanish philosopher, educator; one of the most influential Spanish intellectuals at the end of the 19th and the beginning of the 20th century
- Ramón Menéndez Pidal (1869–1968): Spanish philologist and historian

=== Sports ===
- Santiago Bernabéu Yeste (1895–1978): former president of Real Madrid C.F.
- Vicente Calderón (1913–1987): Spanish businessman and president of Atlético Madrid for twenty years
- Kane (born 1967): American professional wrestler

=== Visual arts ===
- Vincenzo Carducci (1598–1638): Italian painter
- Francisco de Zurbarán (1598–1664): Spanish Baroque painter
- Diego Velázquez (1599–1660): Spanish Baroque painter, important as a portrait artist
- Giambattista Tiepolo (1696–1770): Italian painter and printmaker
- Anton Raphael Mengs (1728–1779): German painter
- Francisco Goya (1746–1828): Spanish Romantic painter and printmaker, regarded both as the last of the Old Masters and the first of the moderns
- Federico de Madrazo (1815–1894): Spanish realist painter
- Juan Luna (1857–1899): Filipino painter, sculptor and a political activist of the Philippine Revolution
- Pablo Picasso (1881–1973): Spanish painter, sculptor, printmaker, ceramicist, and stage designer; spent most of his adult life in France
- Salvador Dalí (1904–1989): Spanish Catalan surrealist painter
- Francis Bacon (1909–1992): Irish-born British figurative painter
- Fernando Botero (1932–2023): Colombian figurative artist and sculptor; considered the most recognized and quoted living artist from Latin America
- Antonio López García (1936): Spanish painter and sculptor
- Carmen Cervera (1943): Spanish philanthropist, socialite and art dealer and collector
