= Obstinato =

Studio album by Barón Rojo
- Released: 1989
- Recorded: March–April, 1989
- Studio: Estudios Chamber
- Genre: Heavy metal, hard rock
- Label: Zafiro
- Producer: Barón Rojo

Barón Rojo chronology
No va más! (1988)	Obstinato (1989)	Desafío (1992)

Obstinato is the seventh studio album of Spanish heavy metal band Barón Rojo, released in 1989 by Zafiro.

This was the last album with original members, bassist "Sherpa" Campuzano and drummer Hermes Calabria. The third track "Get on Your Knees" is a cover of Spanish pop band Los Canarios.

== Tracklist ==
1. "Vampiros y banqueros" (Armando de Castro, Carlos de Castro)
2. "Por vez primera" (Carolina Cortés, Hermes Calabria, José Luis Campuzano)
3. "Get on Your Knees" (Eduardo "Teddy" Bautista)
4. "Tren fantasma" (Cortés-Campuzano)
5. "Colapso en la M-30" (C. de Castro)
6. "Paraíso terrenal" (Cortés-Campuzano-Miguel A. Collado)
7. "Dueño de mi destino" (de Castro-de Castro)
8. "Herencia letal" (A. de Castro-Cortés-Campuzano)
9. "Seguimos vivos" (de Castro-de Castro-Cortés-Campuzano)
10. "Pura sangre" (de Castro-de Castro)

== Personnel ==
- José Luis "Sherpa" Campuzano - bass, vocals, artwork
- Armando de Castro - guitar, vocals
- Carlos de Castro - guitar, vocals
- Hermes Calabria - drums
