= Barón Rojo =

Spanish heavy metal band

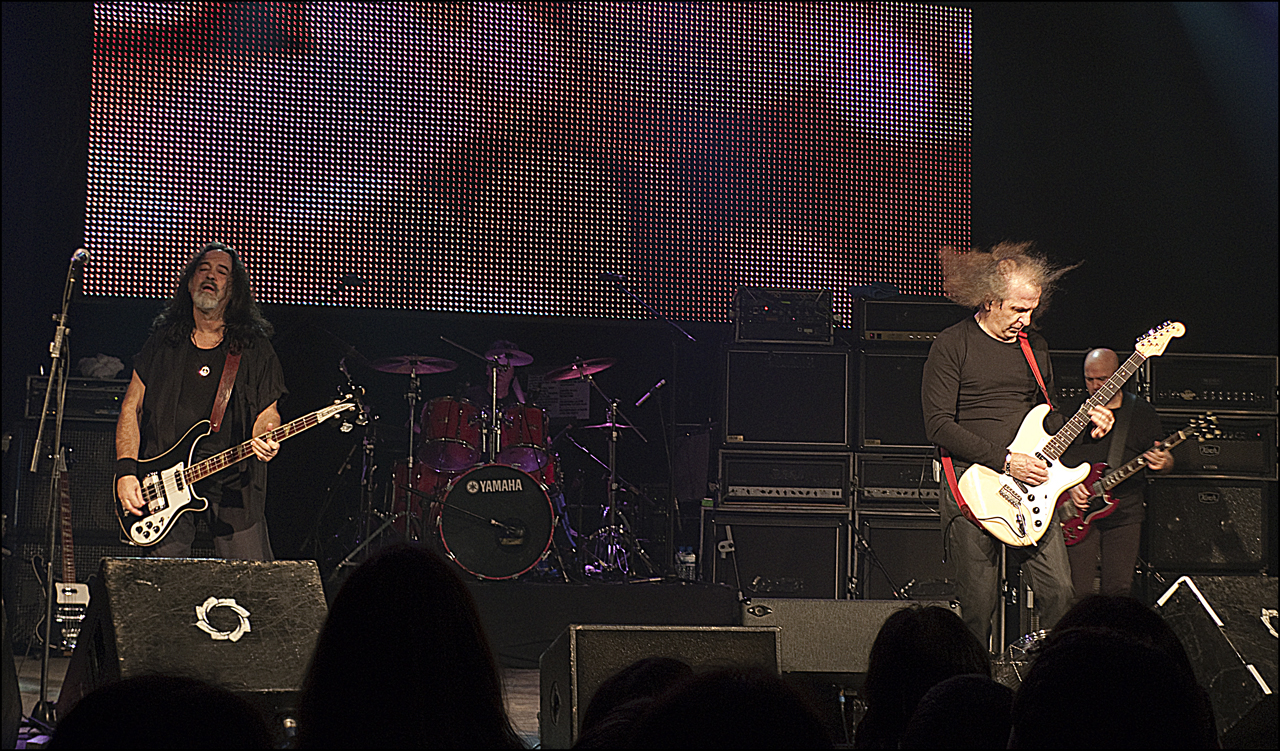
- Original lineup of Barón Rojo, reunited in 2010

Background information
- Origin: Madrid, Spain
- Genres: Heavy metal; hard rock
- Years active: 1980–present
- Labels: Chapa; Zafiro; Locomotive Music; Sony BMG; Avispa; Zero
- Members: Armando de Castro; Carlos de Castro; Rafa Díaz; José Luis Morán
- Past members: José Luis Campuzano; Hermes Calabria; Máximo González; Pepe Bao; José Antonio del Nogal; Niko del Hierro; José Luis Aragón; Valeriano Rodríguez; Ángel Arias; José Martos; Tony Ferrer; Gorka Alegre; Óscar Cuenca; Javier Rodríguez
- Website: baronrojo.net

Barón Rojo (Spanish pronunciation: [baˈɾon ˈroxo]) is a Spanish heavy metal band from Madrid that achieved international success in the 1980s. The band is led by siblings Carlos and Armando de Castro, previously from the band Coz, and is considered one of the most important representatives of Spanish hard rock. Barón Rojo in Spanish means "red baron", the name of the band being an homage to Manfred von Richthofen; the 1981 eponymous song "Barón Rojo" is about him. In 2017, they were ranked number 18 on Rolling Stone's "50 Greatest Spanish Rock Bands".

== History ==
=== Early years, first album: 1980–81 ===
The original lineup of Barón Rojo consisted of brothers Armando and Carlos De Castro, both guitarists, who had just left the hard rock band Coz. José Luis Campuzano, nicknamed "Sherpa", who came from the prog rock band Módulos, joined them as bassist and vocalist. They eventually added Uruguayan drummer Hermes Calabria, who after touring Spain with his prog rock band Psiglo decided to stay in the country. Songwriting duties were divided between the de Castro brothers and "Sherpa" and his wife Carolina Cortés (who wrote the lyrics for his songs). This lineup remained stable until 1989.

Barón Rojo released their debut album, Larga Vida al Rock and Roll, in 1981, with the first single being "Con Botas Sucias". The record achieved moderate success, earning them coverage from the media after winning Gold certification. It also strongly influenced the Spanish rock band Héroes del Silencio.

Around that time, Danish singer Mike Tramp, by then living in Madrid, opened for them at a number of shows. One of those times, Barón Rojo encouraged him to switch to playing hard rock instead of pop. Tramp followed their advice, which would eventually lead to the creation of his band White Lion in 1983.

In addition, Larga Vida al Rock and Roll caught the attention of the Australian hard rock band AC/DC, who invited Barón Rojo to accompany them on their 1981–1982 U.S. tour. The Spaniards turned down this offer, because they considered the travel costs too high, a decision they would later regret, as they never managed to enter the U.S. market.

=== Two albums, global success: 1982–83 ===
Barón Rojo moved to London for the recording of their second album, Volumen Brutal (1982), at Kingsway Studios, owned by Deep Purple frontman Ian Gillan. This album was released in two versions: one with the lyrics in Spanish and another sung in English. Bruce Dickinson from Iron Maiden is credited for helping them with the translation.

Volumen Brutal led the band to international success, especially in the UK, where they were featured on the cover of the music magazine Kerrang!, and it influenced numerous future metal musicians, such as Michael Amott (Carcass, Arch Enemy), who has stated that Barón Rojo is one of his favourite bands; Mille Petrozza (Kreator) and John Gallagher (Raven), who became fans watching Barón Rojo on tour; or Ronnie Romero (Rainbow, Elegant Weapons), who has stated that Volumen Brutal is the first album he ever bought. The record sold two million copies worldwide. It is considered one of the very best metal albums ever released in Spain, and one of the band's best releases.

On 27 August 1982, Barón Rojo played at the Reading music festival, along with Iron Maiden, Twisted Sister, and Marillion.

In 1983, Metalmorfosis, their third studio album, also recorded in London, was released and contained, among many other tracks, the well-known ballad "Siempre estás allí". Together with Volumen Brutal, it is considered one of their best albums.

=== Fourth album, live releases, international tours: 1984–86 ===
In 1985, Barón Rojo released their fourth studio album, En un lugar de la marcha, which included the popular song "Hijos de Caín", as well as two live albums, titled Barón al Rojo Vivo (1984)—produced by Chris Tsangarides—and Siempre Estás Allí (1986). Their international tours continued through Europe and Latin America; in 1984–1985, they had Metallica, at the time a relatively young band, open for them at a number of shows. As of 2018, the American band still played live cover versions of Barón Rojo songs.

=== Changing style, band tensions, fluctuating lineup: 1987–89 ===
From then on, the band began experimenting with new musical elements, including orchestral compositions, as can be heard on their 1987 album, Tierra de Nadie, which includes their well-known song "Tierra de nadie". This album, the band's fifth, rounded out what are considered to be Barón Rojo's best releases. Meanwhile, the mood between band members, described by them as "pure hatred", kept on getting worse.

By the end of 1989, after they released their albums No va más and Obstinato, bassist/singer/composer José Luis Campuzano ("Sherpa") and drummer Hermes Calabria exited the band, leaving the De Castro brothers with an ever-changing lineup, with a turnover ranging from one to several years.

=== Further releases, legal disputes: 1992–2008 ===
The album Desafío, released in 1992 and recorded in Madrid, was produced by guitarist Carlos de Castro, with Niko del Hierro on bass, José Antonio del Nogal on drums, and the de Castro brothers sharing vocal duties. The new bassist and drummer would not last long in the band, and these new lineups without all the original members would receive mixed reviews, beginning with Desafío.

After two compilation albums, the studio album Arma Secreta (1997), and legal disputes with their label (Zafiro) about royalties, BMG released a double compilation album called Cueste lo que cueste, which included 31 hits by the band plus four new songs.

2001 saw the release of the album 20+, an allusion to more than twenty years of existence. In 2002, Barón Rojo were honored with a tribute album, Larga Vida al... Volumen Brutal, by such Spanish and Latin American bands as Rata Blanca, Mägo de Oz, Tierra Santa, and Los Suaves. In 2003, they issued the covers album Perversiones, featuring renditions of songs by artists including Deep Purple, Black Sabbath, Jimi Hendrix, Janis Joplin, and AC/DC.

Drummer Vale Rodríguez left the band in 2005 and was replaced by a returning José Martos.

In 2006, Barón Rojo released Ultimasmentes, an album sung entirely by Carlos de Castro. That same year, the band was honored with another tribute album, this time exclusively of Argentine bands, titled El Barón vuela sobre Argentina.

Ángel Arias and José Martos left Barón Rojo in 2007, just after the live CD and DVD Desde Barón a Bilbao was released, and Tony Ferrer departed in September 2008. He was replaced by former Ñu bassist Gorka Alegre.

=== Reunions, final album, documentary film, touring: 2009–present ===
Barón Rojo held a reunion concert on 20 June 2009 at the Metalway music festival in Zaragoza in their original formation, including José Luís "Sherpa" Campuzano on vocals. That same year, they released the live album En Clave de Rock. After this concert, they reunited again for a tour, starting and finishing in Madrid, with the first show being held at "La Riviera" on 30 January 2010 and the last at the former bullring Palacio de Vistalegre on 22 October 2011, where they announced the filming of a Barón Rojo documentary. The film was released in 2012. The same year, they also released their latest studio album, titled Tommy Barón, a cover album of Tommy featuring Spanish musician Eva Amaral. In 2020, on their 40th anniversary, Barón Rojo decided to finally disband. However, due to the COVID-19 pandemic, their final tour was postponed and as such, their farewell concert rescheduled to December 2021. It featured guest appearances by artists such as Graham Bonnet, Mel Collins, Jørn Lande, and Aurora Beltrán (replacing Doro Pesch, who was unable to travel due to pandemic restrictions).

Despite having announced that this would be their last show, claiming that their farewell tour had been shorter than they would have liked because of the pandemic and appealing to the proximity of the 45th anniversary of their founding in 1980, Barón Rojo played further live shows in 2023, toured Latin America in 2024, and they have continued to put on shows occasionally in 2025. This decision was criticized by the media, especially due to Carlos de Castro's poor vocal performance.

== Band members ==
Current

- Carlos de Castro – vocals, guitar (1980–present)
- Armando de Castro – guitar, vocals (1980–present)
- Rafa Díaz – drums (2007–present)
- José Luis Morán – bass (2020–present)

Past

- José Luís "Sherpa" Campuzano – bass, vocals (1980–1989, 2009–2011)
- Hermes Calabria – drums (1980–1989, 2009–2011)
- Máximo González – vocals (1991)
- Pepe Bao – bass (1990–1991)
- José Antonio del Nogal ("Kamakhan") – drums (1991–1995)
- Niko del Hierro – bass (1991–1992)
- José Luis Aragón – bass (1993–1995)
- Valeriano Rodríguez – drums (1998–2005)
- José Martos – drums (1996–1998, 2005-2007)
- Angel Arias – bass (1995–2007, 2016–2017)
- Tony Ferrer – bass (2007–2008)
- Gorka Alegre – bass (2008–2015)
- Óscar Cuenca – bass (2015–2016)
- Javier Rodríguez – bass (2017–2020)

== Discography ==
=== Studio albums ===
- Larga vida al Rock and Roll (1981)
- Volumen brutal (1982)
- Metalmorfosis (1983)
- En un lugar de la marcha (1985)
- Tierra de nadie (1987)
- No va más! (1988)
- Obstinato (1989)
- Desafío (1992)
- Arma secreta (1997)
- 20+ (2001)
- Perversiones (2003)
- Ultimasmentes (2006)
- Tommy Barón (2012)

=== Live albums ===
- Barón al rojo vivo (1984)
- Siempre estáis allí (1986)
- Barón en Aqualung (2002)
- Desde Barón a Bilbao (2007)
- En Clave de Rock (with the Mislata symphony orchestra) (2009)

=== Compilations ===
- Larga vida al Barón (1995)
- Cueste lo que cueste (1999)
- Las aventuras del Barón (2006)

=== DVDs ===
- Barón en Divino (2002)
- El Rock de nuestra transición Barón - Obús - Asfalto (2004)
- Desde Barón a Bilbao (2007)
- Barón Rojo 30 Aniversario (2010)
