= Metalmorfosis =

Studio album by Barón Rojo
- Released: May 16, 1983
- Studio: Battery Studios, London, UK
- Genre: Heavy metal, hard rock
- Length: 44:04
- Language: Spanish
- Label: Chapa Discos
- Producer: Chapa & Barón Rojo

Barón Rojo chronology
Volumen brutal (1982)	Metalmorfosis (1983)	Barón al rojo vivo (1984)

Professional ratings
Review scores
Source	Rating
AllMusic	3/5 stars

Metalmorfosis is the third studio album by Spanish heavy metal band Barón Rojo, released on May 16, 1983, by Chapa Discos.

The album was recorded at Battery Studios, in London. It was ranked as the 107th best Rock en Español album ever according to American magazine Al Borde. The original vinyl LP edition included a 7" single with two additional songs, "Invulnerable/Herencia letal", these songs also appeared in the early release on cassette as bonus tracks.

== Track listing ==
Side one
No.	Title	Writer(s)	Length
1.	"Casi me mato"	José Luis Campuzano, Carolina Cortés, Armando de Castro	3:44
2.	"Rockero indomable"	A. de Castro, Carlos de Castro, Campuzano	4:01
3.	"Tierra de vándalos"	A. de Castro, C. de Castro	3:46
4.	"¿Que puedo hacer?"	C. de Castro	4:32
5.	"Siempre estás allí"	Campuzano, Cortés, A. de Castro	6:32

Side two
No.	Title	Writer(s)	Length
6.	"Hiroshima"	C. de Castro, A. de Castro, Campuzano	6:50
7.	"El malo"	Campuzano, Cortés	5:30
8.	"Diosa razón"	A. de Castro, C. de Castro, Campuzano	4:20
9.	"Se escapa el tiempo"	Campuzano, Cortés, A. de Castro	4:57

7" Single Side one
No.	Title	Writer(s)	Length
1.	"Invulnerable"	A. de Castro	5:37

7" Single Side two
No.	Title	Writer(s)	Length
2.	"Herencia letal"	Campuzano, Cortés, A. de Castro	4:13

Note: The tracks from the 7" single were not included on the CD re-issue of the album.

== Personnel ==
=== Barón Rojo ===
- Armando de Castro - guitar, backing vocals
- Carlos de Castro - guitar, vocals
- José Luis "Sherpa" Campuzano - bass and vocals
- Hermes Calabria - drums

=== Production ===
- Vicente "Mariskal" Romero (Chapa Discos) - producer
- Nigel Green, Phil Ault - engineers
- Bryan New, Matt Wallis - assistant engineers

== Certifications ==
Region	Certification	Certified units/sales
Spain (PROMUSICAE)	Gold	50,000^{^}
^{^} Shipments figures based on certification alone.
