= En un lugar de la marcha =

Studio album by Barón Rojo
- Released: 1 January 1985
- Studio: Estudios Eurosonic, Estudios Sonoland, Torres Sonido, Madrid
- Genre: Heavy metal
- Length: 42:12
- Label: Chapa Discos
- Producer: Barón Rojo

Barón Rojo chronology
Barón al rojo vivo (1984)	En un lugar de la marcha (1985)	Tierra de Nadie (1987)

Professional ratings
Review scores
Source	Rating
AllMusic	4/5 stars

En un lugar de la marcha (English: Somewhere in the march) is the fourth studio album by Spanish heavy metal band Barón Rojo, released in 1985 by Chapa Discos.

The title of the album is a pun on the first line of the Miguel de Cervantes novel Don Quixote: "En un lugar de La Mancha, de cuyo nombre no quiero acordarme..." (In a village of La Mancha, the name of which I have no desire to call to mind...)

== Track listing ==
Side one
No.	Title	Length
1.	"Breakthoven"	5:27
2.	"El baile de los malditos"	4:24
3.	"Chicos del rock"	5:23
4.	"Caso perdido"	5:46

Side two
No.	Title	Length
5.	"Cuerdas de acero"	4:50
6.	"No ver, no hablar, no oir"	5:44
7.	"Tras de tí"	4:46
8.	"Hijos de Caín"	6:00

== Personnel ==
- José Luis "Sherpa" Campuzano - bass, vocals
- Armando De Castro - guitar. vocals
- Carlos De Castro - guitar, vocals
- Hermes Calabria - drums
