= Larga vida al Rock and Roll =

Studio album by Barón Rojo
- Released: 27 April 1981
- Recorded: November 1980
- Studio: Estudio Escorpio, Madrid, Spain
- Genre: Heavy metal, hard rock
- Length: 36:40
- Language: Spanish
- Label: Chapa Discos
- Producer: Chapa

Barón Rojo chronology
Larga vida al Rock and Roll (1981)	Volumen brutal (1982)

Larga vida al Rock and Roll (English: Long Live Rock and Roll) is the debut album by the Spanish heavy metal band Barón Rojo. It was released on April 27, 1981. The album is dedicated to the memory of John Lennon, who was murdered the previous year.

== Track listing ==
Side one
No.	Title	Writer(s)	Length
1.	"Con botas sucias"	Armando de Castro	4:15
2.	"Anda suelto Satanás"	Luis Eduardo Aute	3:40
3.	"El Pobre"	José Luis Campuzano, Carolina Cortés	3:40
4.	"Los desertores del rock"	Carlos de Castro	4:20
5.	"Efluvios"	A. de Castro, C. de Castro	2:05

Side two
No.	Title	Writer(s)	Length
6.	"Larga vida al Rock and Roll"	A. de Castro, C. de Castro	4:04
7.	"El Presidente"	A. de Castro	3:56
8.	"Chica de la ciudad"	A. de Castro, C. de Castro	4:03
9.	"Barón Rojo"	Campuzano, Cortés	5:40

== Personnel ==
=== Barón Rojo ===
- Armando de Castro - lead, rhythm and slide guitars, backing vocals, lead vocals on track 2
- Carlos de Castro - lead, rhythm and slide guitars, backing vocals, lead vocals on tracks 4, 6 and 8
- José Luis Campuzano - bass, backing vocals, lead vocals on tracks 1, 3, 7 and 9
- Hermes Calabria - drums, percussion

=== Production ===
- Vicente Romero a.k.a. Chapa - producer
- Tino Azores - engineer

== Certifications ==
Region	Certification	Certified units/sales
Spain (Promusicae)	Gold	50,000^{^}
^{^} Shipments figures based on certification alone.
