= Volumen brutal =

Volumen Brutal

Studio album by Barón Rojo
- Released: 22 February 1982
- Recorded: November 1981
- Studios: Kingsway Studios, London, UK
- Genres: Heavy metal, hard rock
- Length: 40:34
- Languages: Spanish, English
- Labels: Chapa Discos (Spain), Kamaflage (UK), Victor (Japan), Mausoleum (Europe), Sony BMG Spain (CD), Hear No Evil (UK), Music on Vinyl (Dutch vinyl reissue)
- Producers: Chapa and Barón Rojo

Barón Rojo chronology
Larga vida al Rock and Roll (1981)	Volumen Brutal (1982)	Metalmorfosis (1983)

Volumen Brutal (English: Brutal Volume) is the second studio album by Spanish metal band Barón Rojo. It was produced by Chapa Discos and Barón Rojo and published by Chapa Discos in 1982.

== Details ==
The album was recorded in 1981 at Kingsway Studios, owned by ex-Deep Purple's frontman Ian Gillan, in two weeks. This album was released in two versions: one with lyrics in Spanish and another sung in English. Bruce Dickinson from Iron Maiden is credited for helping the band with the translation. This led Barón Rojo to international success specially in the United Kingdom, where they appeared on the cover of music magazine Kerrang!. "Stand Up" was chosen as European single.

Volumen Brutal was ranked as the 17th Best Rock en Español Album Ever according to American magazine Al Borde.

Volumen Brutal has seen several CD re-issues over the years. In 1996, the band's original Spanish label, Chapa Discos, issued the English language version on compact disc, followed by the Spanish language version on Chapa Discos/BMG Spain in 1997. In 2005, Sony BMG Music Spain released both the Spanish and English version on one CD. Hear No Evil Recordings, a subsidiary of UK based label Cherry Red Records, followed with a re-issue of the English version in 2014. Also in 2014, Dutch based company Music on Vinyl produced a vinyl re-issue of Volumen Brutal.

== Track listing ==
Side one
No.	Title	Writer(s)	Length
1.	"Incomunicación"	Armando de Castro, Carlos de Castro	3:39
2.	"Los Rockeros van al Infierno"	José Luis Campuzano, Carolina Cortés	4:17
3.	"Dame la oportunidad"	C. de Castro, A. de Castro	3:35
4.	"Son como hormigas"	Campuzano, Cortés, A. de Castro	4:07
5.	"Las flores del mal"	C. de Castro	4:53

Side two
No.	Title	Writer(s)	Length
6.	"Resistiré"	Campuzano, A. de Castro, C. de Castro, Cortés	5:03
7.	"Satánico plan (Volumen brutal)"	A.de Castro, C. de Castro, Campuzano	4:12
8.	"Concierto para ellos"	Campuzano, Cortés, A. de Castro
9.	"Hermano del Rock & Roll"	A. de Castro	3:24
10.	"El Barón vuela sobre Inglaterra"	A. de Castro, C. de Castro, Campuzano, Hermes Calabria	2:42

== Track listing (English version) ==
Side one
No.	Title	Writer(s)	Length
1.	"Isolation Ward"	A. de Castro, C. de Castro	3:39
2.	"Rockers Go to Hell"	Campuzano, Cortés	4:17
3.	"Give Me the Chance"	C. de Castro, A. de Castro	3:35
4.	"Termites"	Campuzano, Cortés, A, de Castro	4:07
5.	"Flowers of Evil"	C. de Castro	4:53

Side two
No.	Title	Writer(s)	Length
6.	"Stand Up"	Campuzano, A. de Castro, C. de Castro, Cortés	5:03
7.	"Someone's Loving You"	A. de Castro, C. de Castro, Campuzano	4:12
8.	"Concert for Them"	Campuzano, Cortés, A. de Castro	4:42
9.	"You're Telling Me"	A. de Castro	3:24
10.	"The Baron Fly Over England"	A. de Castro, C. de Castro, Campuzano, Calabria	2:42

Professional ratings
Review scores
Source	Rating
AllMusic	4.5/5 stars

== Personnel ==
=== Barón Rojo ===
- Armando de Castro - guitars, backing vocals, vocals on "Hermano del rock & roll".
- Carlos de Castro - guitars, backing vocals, vocals on "Incomunicación", "Dame la oportunidad", "Las flores del mal" and "Satánico plan (Volumen brutal)".
- José Luis Campuzano "Sherpa" - bass, backing vocals, vocals on "Los rockeros van al infierno", "Son como hormigas", "Resistiré" and "Concierto para ellos".
- Hermes Calabria - drums and percussion

=== Additional musicians ===
- Mel Collins - saxophone on "Son Como Hormigas"
- Colin Towns - keyboards on "Concierto para ellos"

=== Production ===
- Vicente Romero aka Chapa - producer
- Bob Broglia - engineer

== Certifications ==
Region	Certification	Certified units/sales
Spain (Promusicae)	Platinum	100,000^{^}
^{^} Shipments figures based on certification alone.
