= Barón al rojo vivo =

Live album by Barón Rojo
- Released: 1984
- Recorded: 10–11 February 1984
- Venue: Pabellón de Deportes del Real Madrid with La Pumacrest Mobile
- Genre: Heavy metal, hard rock
- Length: 81:21
- Language: Spanish
- Label: Chapa Discos
- Producer: Chris Tsangarides

Barón Rojo chronology
Metalmorfosis (1983)	Barón al rojo vivo (1984)	En un lugar de la marcha (1985)

Barón al rojo vivo is the first live album by the Spanish heavy metal band Barón Rojo. It was recorded in Pabellón de Deportes del Real Madrid with La Pumacrest Mobile on 10 and 11 February 1984.

== Track listing ==
Side one
No.	Title	Writer(s)	Length
1.	"Barón Rojo"	José Luis Campuzano, Carolina Cortés	5:59
2.	"Incomunicación"	Armando de Castro, Carlos de Castro	5:13
3.	"Campo de Concentración"	Campuzano, Cortés	5:07
4.	"El Mundo Puede Ser Diferente"	Hermes Calabria	4:15

Side two
No.	Title	Writer(s)	Length
5.	"Las Flores del Mal"	C. de Castro	4:48
6.	"Concierto para Ellos"	Campuzano, Cortés, A. de Castro	4:59
7.	"Mensajeros de la Destrucción"	C. de Castro	5:21
8.	"Atacó el Hombre Blanco"	A. de Castro	4:37

Side three
No.	Title	Writer(s)	Length
9.	"Tierra de Vándalos"	A. de Castro, C. de Castro	3:46
10.	"Guitar Solo"	A. de Castro	5:00
11.	"Muchísmo Amor (Whole Lotta Love Reprise)"	Jimmy Page, Robert Plant, John Paul Jones, John Bonham, Willie Dixon	0:18
12.	"Czardas"	Vittorio Monti	1:37
13.	"Los Rockeros Van al Infierno"	Campuzano, Cortés	9:18

Side four
No.	Title	Writer(s)	Length
14.	"Buenos Aires"	Campuzano, A. de Castro	2:58
15.	"Drums Solo"	Calabria	5:10
16.	"Resistiré"	Campuzano, Cortés, A. de Castro, C. de Castro	5:16
17.	"Con Botas Sucias"	A. de Castro	7:39

== Personnel ==
=== Barón Rojo ===
- Armando de Castro – guitar, backing vocals.
- Carlos de Castro – guitar, vocals.
- José Luis Campuzano "Sherpa" – bass and vocals.
- Hermes Calabria – drums

=== Production ===
- Chris Tsangarides – producer, engineer
- Andrew Warwick, Mauricio Gaudenzi – assistant engineers
- Artwork By – M. Cuevas
- Photography – Linos, Moya
- Technician [Cut By] – Arturo Roldán

== Certifications ==
Region	Certification	Certified units/sales
Spain (PROMUSICAE)	Gold	50,000^{^}
^{^} Shipments figures based on certification alone.
