= Tierra de Nadie (Barón Rojo album) =

Studio album by Barón Rojo
- Released: 01 Ene 1987
- Recorded: March–May, 1987
- Studio: Torres Sonido, Madrid
- Genre: Heavy metal
- Length: 44:30
- Label: Chapa Discos

Barón Rojo chronology
En un lugar de la marcha (1985)	Tierra de Nadie (1987)	No va más! (1988)

Tierra de Nadie (English: No man's land) is the fifth studio album by the Spanish heavy metal band Barón Rojo. It was released in 1987.

== Track listing ==
Side one
No.	Title	Length
1.	"Pico de oro"	5:22
2.	"El pedal"	5:26
3.	"La voz de su amo"	4:42
4.	"Tierra de nadie"	6:33

Side two
No.	Title	Length
5.	"Señor Inspector"	4:01
6.	"Sombras en la noche"	6:00
7.	"Pobre Madrid"	5:10
8.	"El precio del futuro"	7:43
