= Margarita María Birriel Salcedo =

Spanish professor, women's studies specialist

Margarita M. Birriel Salcedo (born 26 January 1953) is a tenured professor in the Department of Modern and American History at the Faculty of Philosophy and Letters of the University of Granada. She is an expert in women's history and women's studies.

== Early years and education ==
Margarita María Birriel Salcedo was born in Madrid, January 26, 1953. Her mother was Spanish and her father was Puerto Rican. Her childhood and early youth were marked by frequent family trips across the Atlantic that influenced both her initial education and the development of a cosmopolitan personality. She completed her primary studies in Puerto Rico and Spain, and began her secondary studies in the Province of Granada's town of Almuñécar, where her family settled; she completed them at the Institute of Secondary Education Andrés Manjón in Granada. In 1976, she graduated in Philosophy and Literature (History section) from the University of Granada. After defending his bachelor's thesis and passing a Public Contracts Competition, in 1977, she began to teach in the Department of Modern and American History. In 1987, she read her doctoral thesis, directed by Pedro Gan Jiménez, entitled La repoblación de la tierra de Almuñécar después de la expulsión de los moriscos ("The repopulation of the land of Almuñécar after the expulsion of the Moriscos"), published as La tierra de Almuñécar en tiempo de Felipe II: expulsión de moriscos y repoblación ("The land of Almuñécar in the time of Philip II: expulsion of Moriscos and repopulation").

In addition, Birriel was a student representative during the Franco dictatorship, vice president and spokesperson of the Association of Neighbors at the beginning of the Spanish transition and, later, a trade union representative of the Workers' Commissions at the university which became part of the European Committee of Higher Education of Trade Unions.

== Career ==
Birriell was a scholarship recipient at the School for Advanced Studies in the Social Sciences in Paris where she did postdoctoral work. Since 1989, she is a tenured professor of Modern History at the Faculty of Philosophy and Letters of the University of Granada. She has received additional training at New Mexico State University and University of Essex. She has taught seminars and doctorate courses as a visiting professor at several national and foreign universities including at University of Oviedo, University of Helsinki, National University of Comahue, and National University of Luján.

Birriel was part of the group of teachers that promoted the establishment of the Asociación Universitaria de Estudios de las Mujeres (AUDEM) ("University Association of Women's Studies"), of which she was president between 1993 and 1996. AUDEM provided the synergy, facilitation, and coordination of the first plans for interdisciplinary research in this field. She is a member of the Asociación Española de Historia de las Mujeres (AEIHM) ("Spanish Association of Women's History"), and she has been a member of numerous scientific committees. Birriell has served on advisory boards of various scientific journals including Chronica Nova: Revista de historia moderna de la Universidad de Granada, the Colección Feminae, and Arenal, Revista de Historia de las Mujeres.

Between 1996 and 2000, she served as director of the Instituto de Estudios de la Mujer ("Institute of Women's Studies"), now the Instituto Universitario de Investigación de Estudios de las Mujeres y de Género ("University Research Institute for Women and Gender Studies") at the University of Granada, which coordinated management of the various ways one can understand gender research through a historical lens, the transfer of the institute from the Faculty of Philosophy and Letters to its current headquarters in the Documentation Center, the coordination of the institute and the Vice-Rector for Research within the University of Granada, and the international promotion of the institute's work, especially within Europe and Latin America.

Birriel is part of the research group of the Andalusian Research Plan HUM-603- Women's Studies, a consolidated group of women and gender studies professionals of an interdisciplinary nature, teaching in the Programa Oficial de Doctorado Estudios de las Mujeres, Discursos y Prácticas de Género of the University of Granada. She is also a professor responsible for Historiografía feminista of the Erasmus Mundus interuniversity European master's degree entitled Máster GEMMA en Estudios de Mujeres y Género.

== Selected works ==
- "Construyendo historia: estudios en torno a Juan Luis Castellano". Granada, Universidad, 2013.
- "La tierra de Almuñécar en tiempo de Felipe II: expulsión de moriscos y repoblación". Granada, Universidad, 1989.
- "La repoblación de la tierra de Almuñécar después de la expulsión de los moriscos". Granada, Universidad, 1987.
- "Las mujeres en la historia: itinerarios por la provincia de Granada". Granada, Universidad, 2012.
- "Género y espacio doméstico: la casa rural en el siglo XVIII", en Arquitectura y mujeres en la historia, 2015, pp. 305–339.
- "Clasificando el mundo. Los libros de trajes en la Europa del siglo XVI", en Cultura material y vida cotidiana moderna: escenarios, 2013, pp. 261–278.
- "Las mujeres en la frontera del poniente granadino", en Las mujeres en la historia: itinerarios por la provincia de Granada, 2012, pp. 139–181.
- "Negaciones, asedios y violencias", en Cuerpos de mujeres: miradas, representaciones e identidades, 2007, pp. 243–244.
- "A propósito de Clío: miradas feministas", en Miradas desde la perspectiva de género: estudios de las mujeres, 2005, pp. 49–62.
- "Mujeres del Reino de Granada: historia y género", en La historia del reino de Granada a debate: viejos y nuevos temas: perspectivas de estudio, 2004, pp. 485–502.
