= Enma Iranzo Martín =

Alcadesa de Requena
- In office 17 of June 1995 – 14 of June 2003
- Preceded by: Flor Mercedes Cebrián Gómez
- Succeeded by: Adelo Montés Diana

Personal details
- Born: 1 February 1959 (age 67) Madrid, Spain
- Party: People's Party (Spain)
- Education: Complutense University of Madrid

María Concepción Enma Iranzo Martín (born 1 February 1959) is a pharmaceutical biochemist and Spanish politician.

== Education ==
She earned her degree in Pharmaceutical Biochemistry from the Complutense University of Madrid in 1982. She has a PhD in Biochemistry and Clinical Toxicology, Metabolic Regulation, Environmental contaminants and biochemical effects, Neurochemistry and Experimental Hematology. In February 1985 she studied at the US Oak Ridge National Laboratory.

== Jobs in Chemistry ==
Margin was a researcher at the Centre for Energy Environment and Technology, (1982-1985), a Member of the Nuclear Energy Board (1989-1991) and Coordinatora for the Internal Dosimetry Group of the Spanish Society for Radiological Protection.

== Politics ==

In politics, she worked for the Partido Popular (PP) and was alcadesa and councillor in Requena for 9 years (1995-2003). She held various positions in Valencia as President of the Valencian Federation of Municipalities and Provinces (FVMP), (1999-2003), Director General of Irrigation and Agricultural Infrastructure (1999-2003), Executive member of the provincial People's Party, Regional board member and secretary of local politics and deputy member of the Corts Valencianes Parliament of Valencia, during the Elections to the Corts Valencianes, 2007 and Elections to the Corts Valencianes, 2011,(2007-2011).
