= Luis González Maté =

Spanish boxer (born 1931)

Luis González Maté (born 17 March 1931) is a retired Spanish boxer.

== Early life ==
Maté was born in the neighbourhood of Lavapiés, Madrid. At the age of five, the Spanish Civil War lead him to Barcelona where, soon, his mother died and his father disappeared. He recalls ending up living with his grandmother and when the sirens sounded the warning for the bombings going to look for food in the stores. Survival was tough for them as there was very little food around.

Following the conflict he returned to Madrid to live with his uncle. Soon thereafter his father reappeared and took him and his little brother to live with him in a miserable basement in very poor conditions. He had to do the housework and helped his father in his workshop which was attached to their basement. Despite all his efforts, his father abused them, beat them for no reason and did not feed them well.

Given this scenario he thought of leaving to become a bullfighter. This did not work as he felt sorry for the bulls. Boxeo 1950s

== Career ==
In 1947, Maté turned to boxing which came relatively easy as all his life he had to fight to survive. In his early career he won numerous trophies and later became champion of Castile. In 1952 he turned professional and had a total of 32 bouts during his career. Maté was chosen to go to the 1952 Helsinki Olympics in the Light Welterweight (140 lb/63.5 kg) class. This golden opportunity never materialized as Spain pulled out of Olympics due to political reasons. As of late 1956, the Spanish Boxing Federation ranked him as a light welterweight contender, along with Fernando Bufala Gómez. A motorcycle accident in 1957 ruled him out of the ring for over half a year and on his return to the ring, he was no longer the same. He wanted to go to America to fight with Carlos Ortiz but was offered a blank contract which was refused. On 12 March 1958, just before his 27th birthday, he faced Abdelkader Ben Buker II for the Spanish Welterweight title which he lost on points. He gave the ring another 2 bouts before falling ill and retiring from the sport.

He then turned to his previous experience of stunt man for films. In this career, he once had to carry Sophia Loren in his arms crossing a river and worked on titles like "El Cid", "The Fall of the Roman Empire" and "Spartacus" to quote some well known films. He is in the process of writing his memoirs, entitled "The Man Who Never Was a Child".
