= Tahúres Zurdos =

Spanish band

Tahúres Zurdos was a Spanish band active from 1987 to 2004. It consisted of Aurora Beltrán Gila (vocals), Manuel Beltrán Gila (guitar), Luis Salcedo (bass, until 1990), Juan Manuel Ugarte (bass, from 1990), and Javier Lizarazu (drums).

== Discography ==
- Tahúres zurdos (1988)
- Tahuría (1990)
- Nieve negra (1991)
- Árido (1992)
- La caza (1994)
- Azul (1996)
- Tak (1998)
- El tiempo de la luz (2000)
- 17 Años (2004)
