= Adolfo Rincón de Arellano Garcia =

Spanish politician

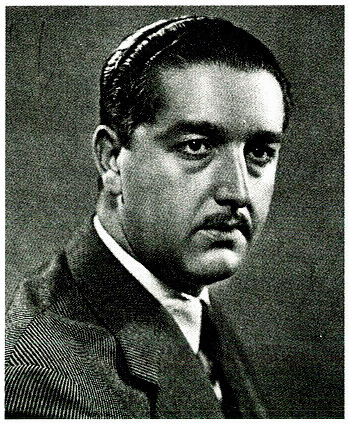

Adolfo Rincón de Arellano Garcia (1910–2006) was a Spanish politician. He was a Deputy, as well as Mayor of Valencia.
