= Arturo Berned =

Spanish sculptor (born 1966)

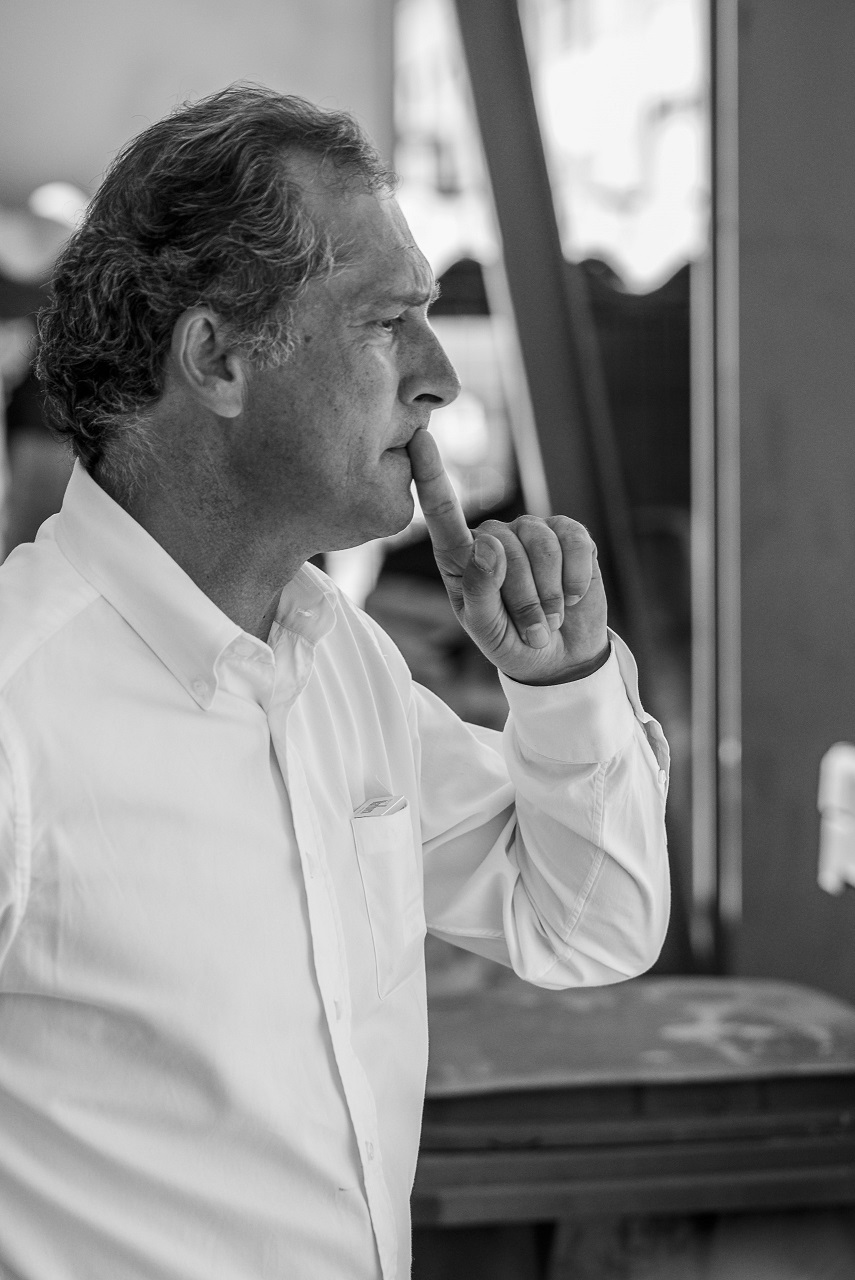
- Born: Arturo Berned Luque; 26 May 1966 (age 60); Madrid, Spain
- Known for: Sculpting
- Website: www.berned.com

Arturo Berned (born 26 May 1966 in Madrid, Spain), is a Spanish sculptor whose works are conceived on the basis of mathematical laws and geometrical layouts charged with symbolism. In 1993 he graduated in Architecture, a profession that he exercised for several years and then combined with his love of sculpture. In the year 2000 he began to dedicate himself entirely to sculpture.

== Biography ==
Arturo Berned was born in Madrid on 26 May 1966 and graduated in Architecture from the Escuela Técnica Superior de Arquitectura (Higher School of Technical Architecture) at the Universidad Politécnica de Madrid (Polytechnic University of Madrid). With the benefit of study grants he completed his course and carried out his first architecture and planning commissions in London, Oxford, Turin and Mexico before finally becoming established in Madrid at the end of the 1990s when he joined the Estudio Lamela architecture practice.

With the Lamela practice he held the post of Projects and Works Manager and was involved in a variety of projects including Terminal T4 at Madrid Barajas Airport (along with Richard Rogers) and the Real Madrid Sports Centre.

In the early 2000 he was awarded the First Prize in the National Projects and Works Competition for Architecture for his work on the Infanta Leonor Hospital in Madrid which he worked on jointly with Ramón Araujo and Luis Vidal. The same year he was also awarded the First Prize in the Concurso Internacional Puerta Escultura Flagship (International Competition Flagship Sculpture Door) Loewe.

This was to be the starting point for him beginning to develop his vocation for sculpture by dedicating himself to researching into the forms and materials which were to later define the identity of his artistic work. The results of this stage were exhibited in Madrid in 2008 in his first solo exhibition.

Following several years of work and exhibitions, in 2012 the IVAM (Valency Institute of Modern Art) is host to what was up to then his most ambitious exhibition. The Valency institution selects some 50 works for exhibition which are representative of his career to date.

A year later he became the first Spanish artist to form a part of the Christian Dior collection with an exhibition entitled "Lady Dior As Seen By", which opened in Hong Kong (where artists from all over the world express their interpretation of the iconic Lady Dior bag).

One of his most recent works is a participation in the "Spanish – Japanese dual year" with a sculpture project sponsored by the Japanese architect Toyo Ito (Pritzker Prize in 2013). The exhibition comprises eight large scale sculptures which result from his living in Japan and which pay tribute to the Japanese people and culture. With this exhibition the artist brought to an end the phase entitled MU which refers to a blank sheet of paper, an attitude of openness without preconceived ideas or prejudices.

== Work ==
Arturo Berned conceives his sculptural works on the basis of mathematical laws and geometrical forms, using a high degree of technical precision and a highly refined form of production. The result is a conceptually abstract work created on the basis of the golden section (also known as the golden number or the phi number).

The material that he normally uses is steel (stainless, lacquered, corten) although on occasions he has been known to make use of aluminium or bronze.

His sculptures are of a variety of sizes while it is the monumental or urban format which best defines his work possibly due to the influence from his background in architecture and planning.

He works on a national and international scale, having participated in exhibitions and commissions in cities such as Los Cabos, Miami, Madrid, Marbella, Mexico City, Santo Domingo, Zaragoza, Tokyo and many others.

=== Swedish Royal Palace ===
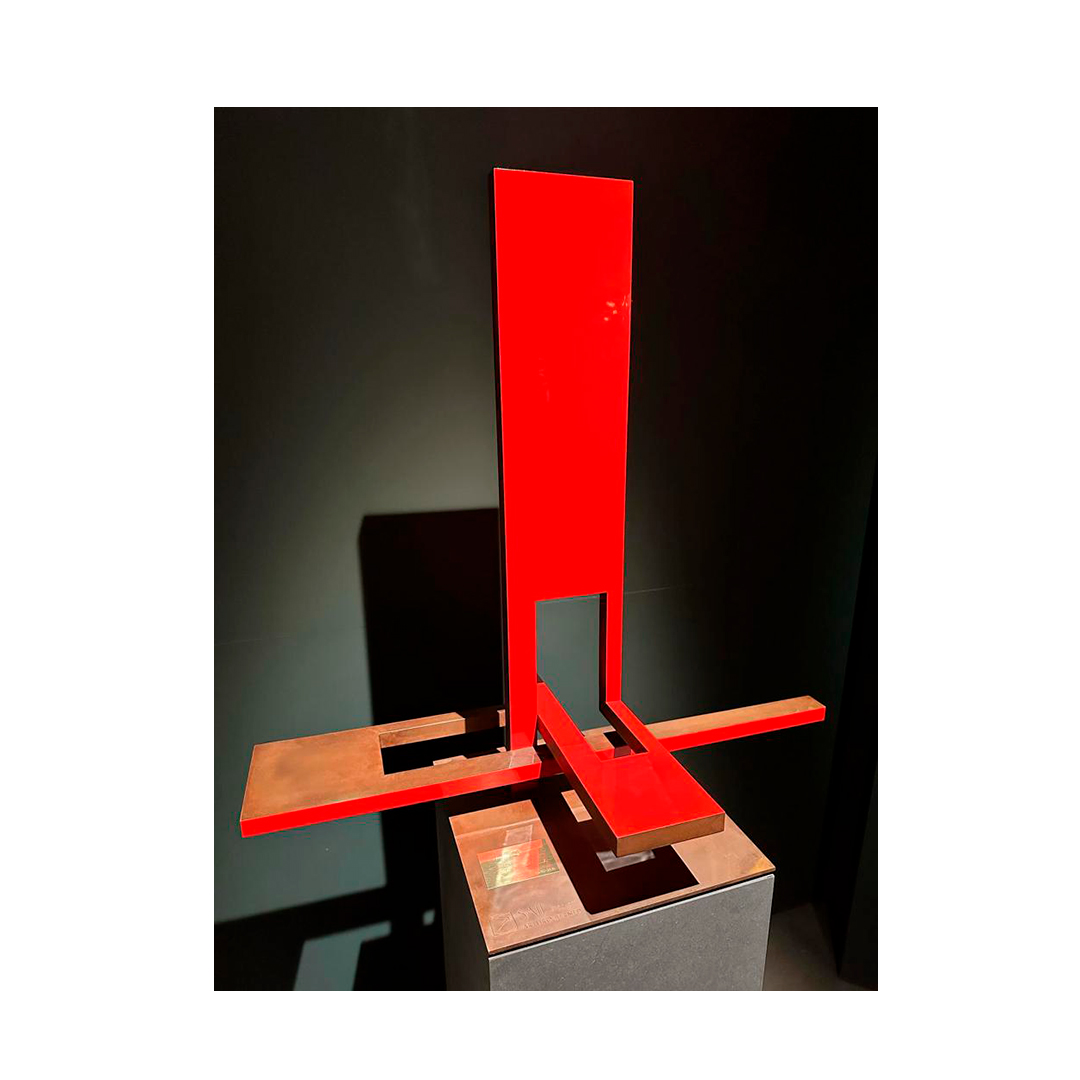
Vela VII, oxidised corten steel and partially finished with red lacquer by Arturo Berned found in the Royal Palace of Sweden

Arturo Berned's VELA VII (SAIL VII) is featured in the grand exhibition hosted by the Royal Court of Sweden: "Vasa to Bernadotte: Culture in Service of the Realm, 1523 – 1973 – 2023", at the Royal Palace of Stockholm from March 2023 until January 2024. This exhibition commemorates a double jubilee: 500 years of the Monarchy and the 50th anniversary of King Carl XVI Gustaf's coronation. The exhibition examines the history of the monarchy through exquisitely selected objects of cultural and historical significance.

VELA VII [Sail VII], 2012, made of oxidised corten steel and partially finished with red lacquer, was presented to King Carl XVI Gustaf and Queen Silvia by King Felipe VI and Queen Letizia of Spain during their state visit to Sweden in November 2012. This gift exchange is a long-time tradition during State Visits, symbolising goodwill between countries. VELA VII celebrates this cultural exchange.

Vela VII [Sail VII] is 39.3 cm (15.5 in) high, with a length of 80.1 cm (31.5 in) and a width of 85.7 cm (33.7 in).

=== Ritz Carlton Zadún, Los Cabos, Baja California, Mexico ===
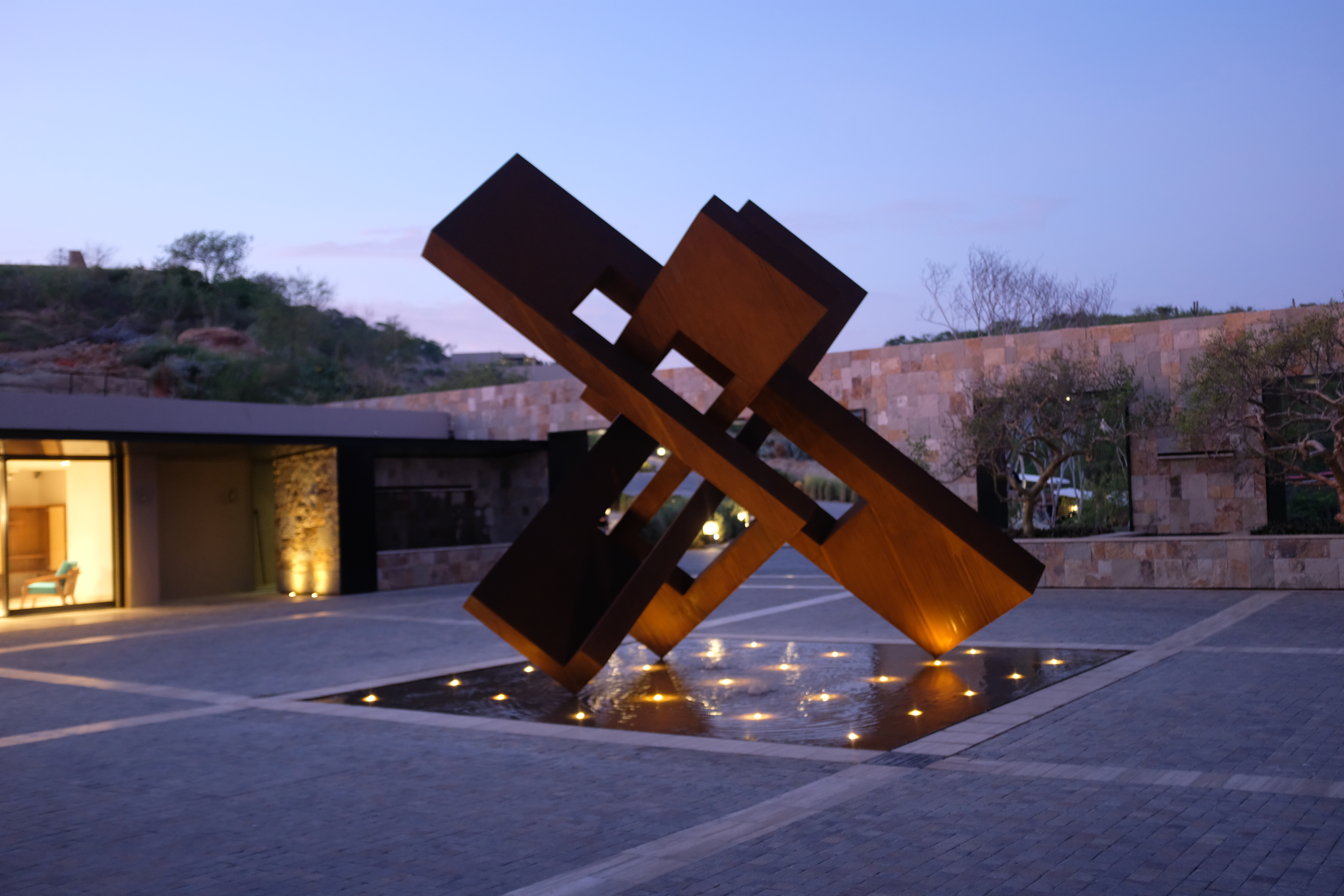
Cabeza (Head) Ritz Carlton by Arturo Berned in Ritz Carlton Zadun, Mexico

Cabeza Ritz Carlton by Arturo Berned is found at the Ritz-Carlton Zadún. It is made of rusted corten steel, a material that generates an oxide layer to protect against corrosion, so the more oxidized it is, the more protected from corrosion and therefore, of the loss of material. The sculpture was commissioned for the opening of the hotal in fall of 2019.

"I think it is extremely beautiful how steel ages as we humans do...To the extent that I get that the people who pass by, that somehow feel the dialogue with architecture, and that this shall produce them pleasure, that is my success." - Berned

Ritz Carlton Cabeza [Head] is made of corten steel plates of 6–10 mm (0.24–0.39 in) thickness and has an oxidised finish. The sculpture is 478 cm (188 in) high, 543 cm (214 in) long and 426 cm (168 in) wide. It weighs 3,695 kg (8,146 lb).

=== BHD Bank, Santo Domingo, Dominican Republic ===
In October 2024, BHD Bank unveiled the sculpture HEAD BHD at the BHD Financial Campus in Santo Domingo, Dominican Republic. Standing at 2.3 meters tall, this corten steel sculpture with an oxidised finish embodies Berned's signature geometric abstraction, integrating seamlessly with the campus's architectural environment. ¨

The unveiling ceremony was led by Luis Molina Achécar, president of the BHD Financial Center, alongside the Banco BHD executives, Luis Lembert, general manager and Josefina Navarro García, senior vice president of the corporate comminocatopn and social responsibility.

“HEAD BHD" is a piece that complements the internal urbanism of BHD, a motivation that has been present throughout the construction of the buildings on this campus, which aims for all elements to integrate harmoniously into the urban environment. ... This appreciation for art, present since the birth of BHD, is a legacy from our founders and is embedded in our culture. Cabeza BHD now becomes part of our history, of the architectural history that shapes the BHD Financial Campus” 

=== Coral Gables, Miami, USA ===
With US representation from the Leon Tovar Gallery, the monumental Cabeza Miami was installed in 2019. Made of a steel plate with 6 mm (0.24 in) thickness and having a sandblasted and oxidised finish, the sculpture sits in front of the Gables Station residential project, on the South Dixie Highway.

Cabeza Miami [Head] is 373 cm (147 in) high, with a length of 328 cm (129 in) and a width of 516 cm (203 in), making it a large piece that strikes the attention of passers by.

=== Dual Year Spain and Japan ===
Arturo Berned and the 2013 Pritzker awarded Japanese architect Toyo Ito collaborated on the project ´MU´, located in Grin Grin Park, Island City, Fukuoka, Japan. The project pays homage to Japanese culture, celebrating the Spain-Japan Dual Year.

´MU´ refers to a blank sheet of paper, a symbol of openness, without prejudices or preconceived ideas, paying homage to Japan and its people. "Berned's sculptures are a combination of triangular iron planes welded together in different configurations and angles. The pieces are endowed with a strange duality. They are like sharp leaves that cut through the earth, but they also cause a feeling of freshness, like new leaves sprouting from their womb. It would seem that they are creations contrary to nature that nevertheless merge with it. They convey a very Western sense of strength, but at the same time they are endowed with the subtlety and sensitivity of origami," Toyo Ito about Berned´s sculptures for ´MU´.

The collaboration exhibit was held from 1 April – 30 September 2014 in Grin Grin Park and is now located at the Embassy of Spain in Tokyo.

This project was completed with the creation of a ¨HEAD DUAL YEAR¨ sculpture, which is placed in front of the Sengokuyama Mori Tower in ARK Hills in Tokyo. The sculpture was gifted by Francisco J. Riberas, president of Gestamp and sponsor of the exhibition, to the city of Tokyo. The sculpture represents the strong relationship between Spain and Japan that stretches over 400 years.

HEAD DUAL YEAR consists of a 24 meters long "ribbon" that wraps around itself, generating a sculpture, is 2.27 meters high, 3.38 meters in length and 2.24 meters in width, weighing 1253 KGs. The sculpture is made of stainless steel plate of 5mm thickness and with a polished finish.

=== King Felipe VI and Queen Letizia of Spain's Gift to Emperor Akihito ===
King Felipe VI and Queen Letizia of Spain visited Emperor Akihito of Japan in 2017 to celebrate the excellent growing relations between the two countries. Among the gifts the King and Queen of Spain presented the Emperor and Empress, is Berned's sculpture HIKARI (PROTECTION).

HIKARI (PROTECTION) is made from stainless steel plates of 5 mm (0.20 in) thickness, with a polished finish; it was produced in 2014. The sculpture measures 71 cm (28 in) in height, 60 cm (24 in) in length and 54 cm (21 in) in width.

== Appearances ==
In November 2019, the television program La Aventura del Saber [The Adventure of Knowledge] hosted an episode explaining Berned's career path from an architect to a sculptor. It shows his methodology of working and the intricate ways he creates his sculptures.

== Exhibitions ==
- NORDART, Büdelsdorf, Germany (2026)
- Metropoli Foundation, Madrid, Spain (2026)
- Dallas Art Fair, Dallas, Texas, USA (2026)
- Art Cologne Mallorca, Mallorca, Spain (2026)
- Club Matador, Madrid, Spain (2026)
- ARCO 2026, Madrid, Spain (2026)
- Fernández-Braso Gallery - 18+6, Madrid, Spain (2026)
- ZONAMACO, Mexico City, Mexico (2026)
- ESTAMPA, Madrid, Spain (2025)
- Lázaro Galdiano Museum, Madrid, Spain (2025)
- Las Misiones Gallerey, Menorca, Spain (2025)
- ELERMOSO, Madrid, Spain (2025)
- Lady Dior House Event, Singapore (2024)
- Lady Dior House Event, Ho Chi Minh, Vietnam (2024)
- Fine Arts Palace, Santo Domingo, República Dominicana (2024)
- Modern Art Museum (Artfiaci), Santo Domingo, República Dominicana (2024)
- ARCO 2024, Madrid, España (2024)
- Francisco Sobrino Museum, Guadalajara, España (2024)
- "Vasa to Bernadotte: Culture in Service of the Realm, 1523 – 1973 – 2023" Royal Palace of Stockholm, Sweden (2023-2024)
- ARCO, Madrid, Spain (2023)
- Museum of Contemporary Art - Christian Dior Designer of Dreams, Tokyo, Japan (2023)
- Palm Beach Modern + Contemporary, Miami, USA
- ARCO, Madrid, Spain (2022)
- Matador Club, Madrid, Spain (2022)
- Art of the World Gallery, Houston, USA (2021)
- Westbund Museum, Shanghai, China (2021)
- MOCAUP Museum, Shanghai, China (2021)
- ARCO, Madrid, Spain (2021)
- Michael Fuchs Gallery, Berlin, Germany (2021)
- ARCO, Lisbon, Portugal (2020)
- ARCO, Madrid, Spain (2020)
- Fernandez-Braso Gallery, Madrid, Spain (2019)
- Beijing Art Biennale, Beijing, China (2019)
- ARCO, Madrid, Spain (2019)
- Art Basel, Hong Kong, China (2018)
- ARCO, Madrid, Spain (2018)
- Leon Tovar Gallery, New York, USA (2017)
- ARCO, Madrid, Spain (2017)
- Leon Tovar Gallery, New York, USA (2016)
- ARTBO, Bogota, Colombia (2016)
- PROMOARTE, Tokyo, Japan (2016)
- ARCO, Lisbon, Portugal (2016)
- Langen Foundation, Neuss, Germany (2016)
- ARCO, Madrid, Spain (2016)
- Aurora Vigil-Escalera, Gijon, Spain (2016)
- Semmingsen Gallery, Oslo, Norway (2016)
- ART ASPEN, Aspen, USA (2015)
- ART MARBELLA, Marbella, Spain (2015)
- Dior Gallery, Seoul, South Korea (2015)
- Dior Boutique, Tel Aviv, Israel (2015)
- Sculpture Show, Miami, USA (2014)
- Sammer Gallery, Miami, USA (2014)
- ART MIAMI, Miami, USA (2014)
- IBERO-AMERICAN Sculpture, Tokyo, Japan (2014)
- ART ASPEN, Aspen, USA (2014)
- PIE (Sculpture International Park), Madrid, Spain (2014)
- Representative for Spain in the Spain – Japan Dual Year (2013-2014)
- "Lady Dior as seen by", Hong Kong (2013)
- Biennial of the South, Panama (2013)
- Art Madrid ´13, Madrid (2013)
- IV Biennial of Contemporary Art ONCE, Madrid (2012)
- "Sculpture Underway", IVAM Museum, Valency (2012)
- Espacio de Las Artes, Madrid (2011)
- Feriarte, Madrid (2011)
- (1+√5)/2, Leitner Building, Madrid (2011)
- Art Madrid ´11, Madrid (2011)
- Exhibition "Contemporary Sculptors" in the Bosque de Acero, Cuenca (2010)
- Ansorena Gallery, Madrid (2010)
- Shopping Centre El Zielo, Madrid (2009)
- Open Art Fair, Netherlands, Gaudí Gallery (2009)
- Gaudí Gallery, Madrid (2009)
- Art Madrid ´09, Madrid (2009)
- Arrow ´09, Madrid (2009)
- "Arturo Berned", Estudio Lamela, Madrid (2008)
- The art Work of architects. COAM Cultural Foundation, Madrid (2000)
- Everyday Objects. Vanguardia Gallery, Bilbao (1998).

== Awards ==
- Selected for the International Public Sculpture Competition Parque del Levante, Murcia (2013)
- First Prize International Monumental Sculpture Competition Puerto Venecia, Zaragoza (2012)
- First Prize International Competition Puerta Escultura Flagship Loewe, Madrid (2001)
- Selected for the International Constructions Sculpture Prize Sacejo, Oviedo (2007)
- International Sculpture Prize Caja Extremadura, Cáceres (2008)

== Collections ==
- Kells Collection
- AZCONA Foundation
- GMP Collection
- City Council of Coral Gables
- Ritz Carlton Collection
- City Council of Tokyo
- Mori Museum
- Mitsui Collection
- IVAM Collection
- Christian Dior Collection
- BMW Collection
- GESTAMP Collection
- CASER Group Collection
- City Council of Zaragoza
- Iberdrola Collection
- Soller Museum
- Loewe Foundation
- Maraya Foundation
- Ministry of Economy and Finance
- Unesid Union of Metallurgical Companies
