= Virgin Steele discography =

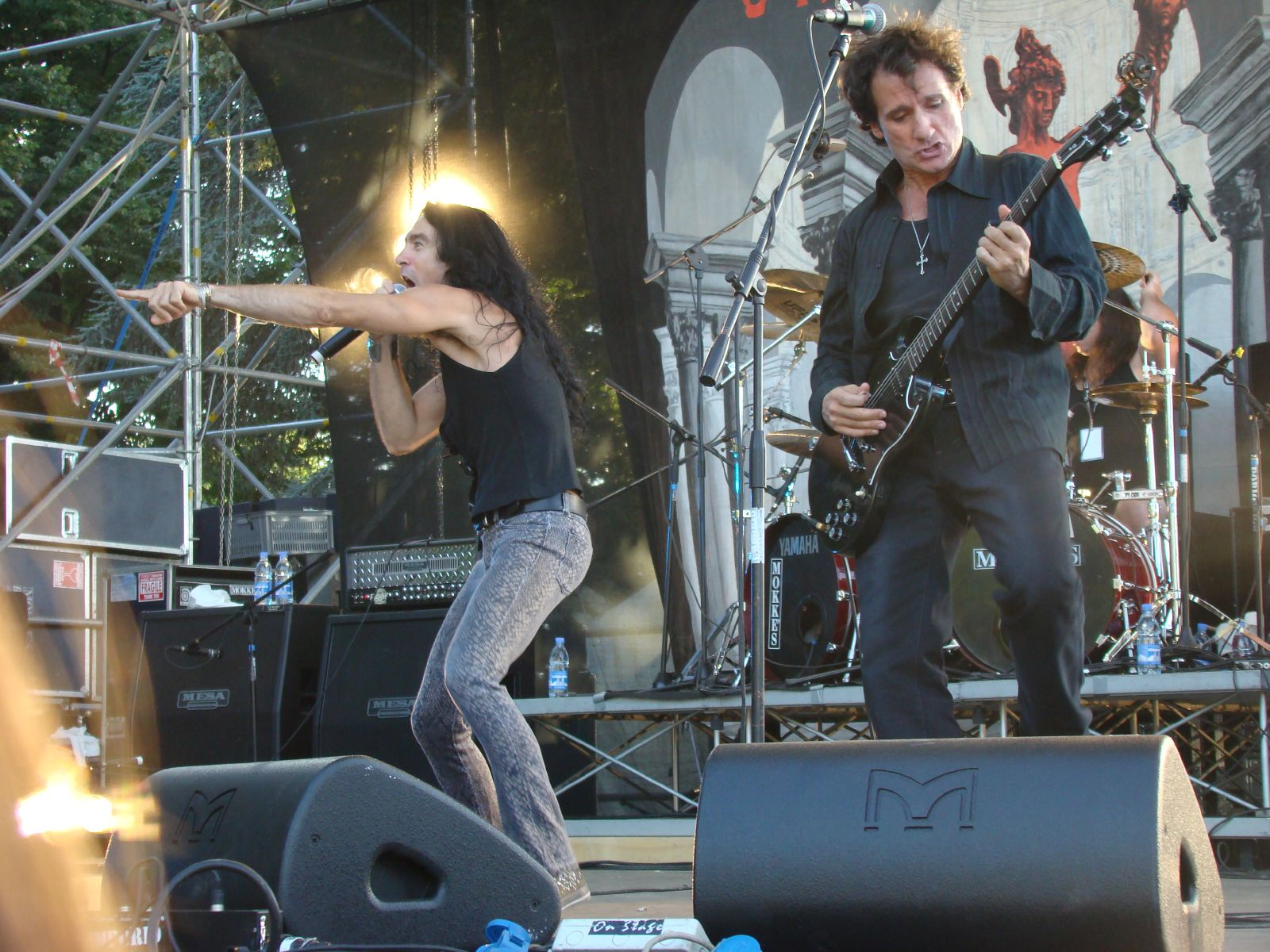
- Virgin Steele performing in 2007
- Studio albums: 16
- Extended plays: 2
- Live albums: 0
- Compilation albums: 2
- Singles: 2
- Music videos: 4

This is the discography of Virgin Steele, an American power metal band founded in 1981 in Long Island, New York by Jack Starr. It includes twelve albums, two EP, and various other media.

== Albums ==
Year	Name	Label	Type
1982	Virgin Steele	Music for Nations	Full
1983	Guardians of the Flame	Mongol Horde	Full
1985	Noble Savage	Cobra Records	Full
1988	Age of Consent	Maze Records	Full
1993	Life Among the Ruins	Shark Records	Full
1995	The Marriage of Heaven and Hell Part I	T&T / Noise Records	Full
1996	The Marriage of Heaven and Hell Part II	T&T / Noise Records	Full
1998	Invictus	T&T / Noise Records	Full
1999	The House of Atreus Act I	T&T / Noise Records	Full
2000	The House of Atreus Act II	T&T / Noise Records	Full
2006	Visions of Eden	T&T / Sanctuary Records	Full
2010	The Black Light Bacchanalia	SPV/Steamhammer	Full
2015	Nocturnes of Hellfire & Damnation	Steamhammer	Full
2018	Ghost Harvest – Vintage I – Black Wine for Mourning (*)	Steamhammer	Full
2018	Ghost Harvest – Vintage II – Red Wine for Warning (*)	Steamhammer	Full
2018	Gothic Voodoo Anthems (*)	Steamhammer	Full
2023	The Passion of Dionysus	Steamhammer	Full

(*) part of the 2018 box set Seven Devils Moonshine

== EPs ==
- 1983 – Wait for the Night
- 2000 – Magick Fire Music

== Compilations ==
- 1983 – Burn the Sun
- 2002 – Hymns to Victory (*)
- 2002 – The Book of Burning (*)

(*) reissues included in 2018 box set Seven Devils Moonshine

== Singles ==
- 1992 – Snakeskin Voodoo Man
- 1998 – Through Blood and Fire

== Videos/DVD ==
- 1992 – Tale of the Snakeskin Voodoo Man
