= The Marriage of Heaven and Hell =

Book with text and images by William Blake

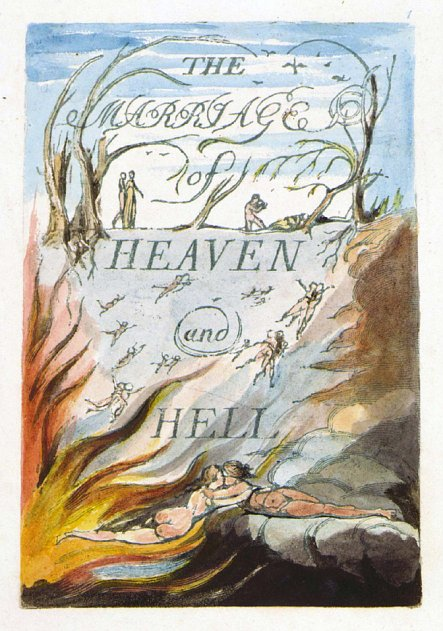
The title page of the book, 1790, copy D, held by the Library of Congress

The Marriage of Heaven and Hell is a book by the English poet and printmaker William Blake. It is a series of texts written in imitation of biblical prophecy but expressing Blake's own intensely personal Romantic and revolutionary beliefs. Like his other books, it was published as printed sheets from etched plates containing prose, poetry, and illustrations. The plates were then coloured by Blake and his wife, Catherine.

It opens with an introduction of a short poem entitled "Rintrah roars and shakes his fires in the burden'd air".

William Blake claims that John Milton was a true poet and his epic poem Paradise Lost was "of the Devil's party without knowing it". He also claims that Milton's Satan was truly his Messiah.

The work was composed between 1790 and 1793, in the period of radical ferment and political conflict during the French Revolution. The title is an ironic reference to Emanuel Swedenborg's theological work Heaven and Hell, published in Latin 33 years earlier. Swedenborg is directly cited and criticised by Blake in several places in the Marriage. Though Blake was influenced by his grand and mystical cosmic conception, Swedenborg's conventional moral strictures and his Manichaean view of good and evil led Blake to express a deliberately depolarised and unified vision of the cosmos in which the material world and physical desire are equally part of the divine order; hence, a marriage of heaven and hell. The book is written in prose, except for the opening "Argument" and the "Song of Liberty". The book describes the poet's visit to Hell, a device adopted by Blake from Dante's Divine Comedy and Milton's Paradise Lost.

== Proverbs of Hell ==
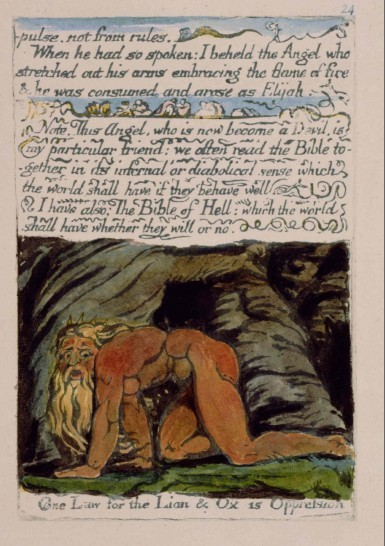
Plate from Marriage of Heaven and Hell, depicting Nebuchadnezzar

Unlike those of Milton and Dante, Blake's conception of Hell begins not as a place of punishment, but as a source of unrepressed, somewhat Dionysian energy, opposed to the authoritarian and regulated perception of Heaven. Blake's purpose is to create what he called a "memorable fancy" in order to reveal the repressive nature of conventional morality and institutional religion, which he describes thus:

The ancient Poets animated all sensible objects with Gods or Geniuses, calling them by the names and adorning them with the properties of woods, rivers, mountains, lakes, cities, nations, and whatever their enlarged & numerous senses could perceive.

And particularly they studied the genius of each city & country, placing it under its mental deity.

Till a system was formed, which some took advantage of & enslav'd the vulgar by attempting to realize or abstract the mental deities from their objects: thus began Priesthood.

Choosing forms of worship from poetic tales.

And at length they pronounced that the Gods had orderd such things.

Thus men forgot that All deities reside in the human breast.

— Plate 11

In the most famous part of the book, Blake reveals the Proverbs of Hell. These display a very different kind of wisdom from the Biblical Book of Proverbs. The diabolical proverbs are provocative and paradoxical. Their purpose is to energise thought. Several of Blake's proverbs have become famous:

The road of excess leads to the palace of wisdom.

— "Proverbs of Hell" line 3 (Plate 7)

The tygers of wrath are wiser than the horses of instruction.

— "Proverbs of Hell" line 44 (Plate 9)

Blake explains that,

Without Contraries is no progression. Attraction and Repulsion, Reason and Energy, Love and Hate, are necessary to Human existence.

From these contraries spring what the religious call Good & Evil. Good is the passive that obeys Reason. Evil is the active springing from Energy.

Good is Heaven. Evil is Hell.

— Plate 3

== Interpretation ==
Blake's theory of contraries was not a belief in opposites but rather a belief that each person reflects the contrary nature of God, and that progression in life is impossible without contraries. Moreover, he explores the contrary nature of reason and of energy, believing that two types of people existed: the "energetic creators" and the "rational organizers", or, as he calls them in The Marriage of Heaven and Hell, the "devils" and "angels". Both are necessary to life according to Blake.

Blake's text has been interpreted in many ways. It certainly forms part of the revolutionary culture of the period. The references to the printing-house suggest the underground radical printers producing revolutionary pamphlets at the time. Ink-blackened printworkers were comically referred to as a "printer's devil", and revolutionary publications were regularly denounced from the pulpits as the work of the devil.

== Influence ==
The vision expressed in The Marriage of Heaven and Hell of a dynamic relationship between a stable "Heaven" and an energised "Hell" has fascinated theologians, aestheticians and psychologists.

Aldous Huxley took the name of one of his most famous works, The Doors of Perception, from this work. The Doors of Perception, in turn, inspired the name of the American rock band The Doors. Huxley's contemporary C. S. Lewis wrote The Great Divorce about the divorce of Heaven and Hell, in response to Blake's Marriage.

According to Michel Surya, French writer Georges Bataille threw pages of Blake's book into the casket of his friend and lover Colette Peignot on her death in 1938. An allusion from The Marriage of Heaven and Hell, depicting Aristotle's skeleton, is present in Wallace Stevens's poem "Less and Less Human, O Savage Spirit". Benjamin Britten included several of the Proverbs of Hell in his 1965 song cycle Songs and Proverbs of William Blake.

Infinite Jest by David Foster Wallace features it in an avant-garde film called The Pre-Nuptial Agreement of Heaven and Hell. Drive Your Plow Over the Bones of the Dead by Olga Tokarczuk takes its title from one of the Proverbs of Hell. Kelly Reichardt's film First Cow uses one of the Proverbs of Hell ("The bird a nest, the spider a web, man friendship") as an epigraph.

Allusions to the work have often been made within aspects of popular culture, notably in the counterculture of the 1960s. The Norwegian experimental band Ulver released an album that was a musical setting of Blake's book, titled Themes from William Blake's The Marriage of Heaven and Hell. The American black metal band Judas Iscariot extensively quotes parts of The Marriage of Heaven and Hell in their song "Portions of Eternity Too Great for the Eye of Man" (whose title itself was taken from a quote from Blake's work). The American power metal band Virgin Steele released two albums based on Blake's work, 1995's The Marriage of Heaven and Hell Part I and 1996's The Marriage of Heaven and Hell Part II. "The road of excess leads to the palace of wisdom" is quoted by Annie Savoy (Susan Sarandon) in the 1988 movie Bull Durham, and can be seen in writing in a scene from David Cronenberg's 1975 film Shivers. The quote also appears (slightly paraphrased as "the path of excess leads to the tower of wisdom") in the lyrics of the 1999 Enigma hit Gravity of Love.

== General sources ==
- Blake, William (1988). Erdman, David V. (ed.). The Complete Poetry and Prose (Newly revised ed.). Anchor Books. ISBN 0385152132.
- Nurmi, Martin (1979). "On The Marriage of Heaven and Hell". In Blake's Poetry and Designs. Mary Lynn Johnson and John E. Grant, eds. New York: Norton.
