= Blaze of Glory =

Blaze of Glory may refer to:

== Music ==
- Blaze of Glory (Burning Starr album), 1987
- Blaze of Glory (Flesh-n-Bone album), 2011
- Blaze of Glory (Game Theory album), 1982
- Blaze of Glory (Joe Jackson album), 1989
- Blaze of Glory (Jon Bon Jovi album), 1990
- "Blaze of Glory" (Jon Bon Jovi song), 1990
- "Blaze of Glory" (Kenny Rogers song), 1981
- "Blaze of Glory", by Audio Adrenaline from Adios: The Greatest Hits, 2006

== Television episodes ==
- "Blaze of Glory" (Blaze and the Monster Machines), the series premiere, 2014
- "Blaze of Glory" (Bugs), 1997
- "Blaze of Glory" (Justified), 2011
- "Blaze of Glory" (Star Trek: Deep Space Nine), 1997
- "The Blaze of Glory" (The O.C.), 2005
- "The Blaze of Glory" (The Walking Dead: World Beyond), 2020

== Literature ==
- A Blaze of Glory, a 2012 historical novel by Jeff Shaara
- Blaze of Glory, a 2006 fantasy novel by Michael Pryor
- Blaze of Glory: The Last Ride of the Western Heroes, a 2000 series published by Marvel Comics

== See also ==
- Blaze o' Glory, a 1929 film
- Blaze Glory, a 1970 stop-motion short film
- Blades of Glory, a 2007 comedy
