= Jack Starr's Burning Starr =

American heavy metal band

- Also known as: Burning Starr
- Origin: New York City, U.S.
- Genres: Heavy metal, power metal
- Years active: 1984–1989, 2008–present
- Labels: Magic Circle Music
- Members: Jack Starr; Todd Michael Hall; Ned Meloni
- Past members: James Harris; Frank Vestry; Mike Tirelli; Bruno Ravel; Keith Collins; William Fairchild; David DeFeis; Tony Galtieri – Drummer; Ed Spahn; Mark Edwards; Greg D'Angelo; Todd Michael Hall
- Website: burningstarr.com

Jack Starr's Burning Starr, also known as simply Burning Starr, is an American heavy metal band from New York City, formed in 1984. The band was founded and guided by former Virgin Steele guitarist Jack Starr and enjoyed limited success in the US during the explosion of hair metal in the second half of the 1980s. Burning Starr released four studio albums before disbanding, with Starr going to work in other short-living formations. The band was resurrected by Starr in 2008 and signed with Magic Circle Music, playing in the Magic Circle Festival of 2008 and 2009. The band played at the 2013 Keep It True festival and recorded a DVD.

== Line-up ==
- Jack Starr – guitars
- Alexx Panza – vocals
- Ned Meloni – bass
- Kenny "Rhino" Earl – drums

== Discography ==
=== Albums ===
- Rock the American Way (1985)
- No Turning Back (1986)
- Blaze of Glory (1987)
- Jack Starr's Burning Starr (1989)
- Defiance (2009)
- Land of the Dead (2011)
- Stand Your Ground (2017)
- Souls of the Innocent (2022)

=== Compilations ===
- Burning Starr (1998)
