= Seven Devils Moonshine =

Compilation album by Virgin Steele
- Released: November 23, 2018
- Genre: Heavy metal, power metal
- Label: SPV/Steamhammer
- Producer: David DeFeis

Virgin Steele chronology
Nocturnes of Hellfire & Damnation (2015)	Seven Devils Moonshine (2018)	The Passion of Dionysus (2023)

Professional ratings
Review scores
Source	Rating
metal.de	5/10
Metal Hammer Germany	5/7
Metal Hammer Germany (2nd review)	2/7
Metal Temple Magazine	7/10

Seven Devils Moonshine is a five-disc box set by the American heavy metal band Virgin Steele, comprising three new albums and two reissues. It was released in November 2018 by SPV/Steamhammer. CDs 1 to 3 are new albums, while CDs 4 and 5 are reissues of Hymns to Victory and The Book of Burning respectively, along with bonus tracks.

== Track listing ==
=== Ghost Harvest Vintage I: Black Wine for Mourning ===
No.	Title	Length
1.	"Seven Dead Within"	8:00
2.	"Green Dusk Blues"	7:42
3.	"Psychic Slaughter"	5:58
4.	"Bonedust" (Orchestral version)	6:32
5.	"Hearts on Fire"	5:09
6.	"Child of the Morning Star"	5:14
7.	"Murder in High-Gloss Relief"	1:14
8.	"Feral"	10:02
9.	"Justine"	7:40
10.	"Princess Amy"	5:19
11.	"Wicked Game" (Chris Isaak cover)	9:04
12.	"Clouds of Oblivion Medley": I. "Little Wing" (Jimi Hendrix Experience cover) – 4:20; II. "The Gods Don't Remember..." – 2:10"	6:30

=== Ghost Harvest Vintage II: Red Wine for Warning ===
No.	Title	Length
1.	"The Evil in Her Eyes" (Piano & vocal version)	4:24
2.	"Feelin' Alright" (Traffic cover)	4:24
3.	"Sister Moon"	4:08
4.	"Summertime Darkness Suite": I. "Sweating into Dawn" – 0:21; II. "Summertime" – 3:58; III. "Black Leaves Swirl Down My Street" – 0:57"	5:16
5.	"Rip Off"	4:01
6.	"The Gods Are Hungry Triptych": I. "The Gods Are Hungry Poem" – 2:03; II. "The Poisoned Wound" – 2:17; III. "The Birth of Beauty" – 6:03"	10:23
7.	"Profession of Violence..."	3:58
8.	"Rock Steady" (Bad Company cover)	5:16
9.	"Nutshell" (Alice in Chains cover)	5:36
10.	"Slow & Easy "Intro""	2:02
11.	"Jesus Just Left Chicago" (ZZ Top cover)	2:44
12.	"Late Night Barroom Hoodoo Medley": I. "Soul Kitchen" (The Doors cover) – 1:13; II. When the Music's Over (The Doors cover) – 1:06; III. "Crawling King Snake" (Big Joe Williams cover) – 1:13; IV. "When the Music's Over" (Reprise) – 1:12; V. "Imhullu" – 1:20"	6:04
13.	"The Drained White Suite": I. "After Dark" – 2:57; II. "Wake the Dead" – 1:11; III. "The Graveyard Dance" – 0:58"	5:06
14.	"The Triple Goddess"	8:02
15.	"Twilight of the Gods" (Live acoustic rehearsal version)	4:15
16.	"Transfiguration" (Live acoustic rehearsal version)	3:40

=== Gothic Voodoo Anthems ===
No.	Title	Length
1.	"I Will Come for You" (Orchestral version)	7:15
2.	"Queen of the Dead" (Orchestral version)	3:42
3.	"The Orpheus Taboo" (Orchestral version)	7:27
4.	"Kingdom of the Fearless (The Destruction of Troy)" (Orchestral version)	7:50
5.	"The Black Light Bacchanalia" (Orchestral version)	7:13
6.	"Zeus Ascendant"	1:15
7.	"By the Hammer of Zeus (And the Wrecking Ball of Thor)" (Orchestral version)	8:06
8.	"The Gothic Voodoo Suite: A: "Rumanian Folk Dance No. 3 "Pe Loc"" – 0:53; B: "Delirium "Excerpt"" – 1:14; C: "Snakeskin Voodoo Man" (Orchestral version) – 4:30"	6:37
9.	"The Enchanter"	4:41
10.	"The Fire & Ice Medley: Scene 1: "Bone China" – 3:20; Scene 2: "No Quarter" (Led Zeppelin cover) – 3:30; Scene 3: "Bone China Reprise" – 0:48"	7:38
11.	"Passion in the French Quarter Medley: Song A: "Chloe Dancer" – 2:12; Song B: "Gentle Groove" – 3:46"	5:58
12.	"Darkness-Darkness" (The Youngbloods cover)	4:41
13.	"Death Letter Blues"	3:52
14.	"Spoonful" (Willie Dixon cover)	3:29

=== Hymns to Victory ===
No.	Title	Length
1.	"Flames of Thy Power (From Blood They Rise)"	5:38
2.	"Through the Ring of Fire"	5:25
3.	"Invictus"	5:35
4.	"Crown of Glory (Unscarred)" (In Fury Mix)	6:39
5.	"Kingdom of the Fearless (The Destruction Of Troy)"	7:39
6.	"The Spirit of Steele" (Acoustic version)	3:24
7.	"A Symphony of Steele" (Battle Mix)	5:20
8.	"The Burning of Rome (Cry for Pompeii)"	6:38
9.	"I Will Come for You"	5:45
10.	"Dust from the Burning & Amaranth" (Orchestral versions)	5:05

Bonus tracks
No.	Title	Length
11.	"Noble Savage" (Long Lost Early Mix)	7:06
12.	"Mists of Avalon"	5:09
13.	"Emalaith"	9:55

=== The Book of Burning ===
No.	Title	Length
1.	"Conjuration of the Watcher"	4:24
2.	"Don't Say Goodbye (Tonight)"	4:42
3.	"Rain of Fire"	6:27
4.	"Annihilation"	1:05
5.	"Hellfire Woman"	6:56
6.	"Children of the Storm"	6:19
7.	"The Chosen Ones"	8:04
8.	"The Succubus"	3:16
9.	"Minuet in G Minor"	0:48
10.	"The Redeemer"	5:41
11.	"I Am the One"	3:49
12.	"Hot and Wild"	4:05
13.	"Birth Through Fire"	0:39
14.	"Guardians of the Flame"	6:44
15.	"The Final Days"	5:50
16.	"A Cry in the Night"	4:45

Bonus track
No.	Title	Length
17.	"Queen of the Dead" (Nordic Twilight version)	4:15

== Personnel ==
- David DeFeis – vocals, keyboards, percussions, guitars, orchestration, effects, producer
- Edward Pursino – guitars
- Joshua Block – guitars, bass, engineer
