= Land of the Dead (disambiguation) =

Land of the Dead is another term for the afterlife or underworld.

Land of the Dead or The Land of the Dead may also refer to:

== Entertainment ==
- Land of the Dead, a 2005 zombie film directed by George A. Romero
  - Land of the Dead: Road to Fiddler's Green, a 2005 first-person shooter video game based on the film
- The Land of the Dead, a 2000 audio drama based on the Doctor Who series
- "The Land of the Dead", a chapter in the 1940 film serial Flash Gordon Conquers the Universe

=== Music ===
- "Land of the Dead", a song on Summoning's 2006 album Oath Bound
- "Land of the Dead", a song on Voltaire's 2007 album Ooky Spooky
- "Land of the Dead" (Misfits song), 2009
- Land of the Dead (album), a 2011 album by heavy metal band Jack Starr's Burning Starr

== Other ==
- Another term for the Egyptian underworld of Duat
