= Gulliver's nightclub fire =

1974 arson attack in the United States

- Location: 41.0139°N 73.6561°W; Port Chester, New York
- Date: June 30, 1974 c. 1:00 am
- Attack type: Arson, mass murder
- Deaths: 24
- Injuries: 32
- Perpetrator: Peter J. Leonard
- Motive: To cover up burglary at adjacent bowling alley

The Gulliver's nightclub fire occurred in the early hours of June 30, 1974, on the border of Port Chester, New York and Greenwich, Connecticut. The fire killed 24 patrons and injured 19 patrons and 13 firemen. The fire was caused by arson in an adjacent bowling alley that had been aimed at covering up a minor burglary there.

== The venue ==
The restaurant was formally known as Gulliver's Restaurant Inc. and opened in 1971. It attracted crowds of young people, particularly Connecticut residents, since while both states had a drinking age of 18, New York had last call much later. "For decades, youths from southern Connecticut, where the drinking age was 18 since 1972, had flocked to this part-leafy, part-scruffy miniature city so they could take advantage of New York's later last call hour." The restaurant was originally the Old Post Grill, but that burned in 1962; then it was Lucy's, which had a fire in 1968. The building was owned by the Port Chester Electrical Construction Corporation.

The building housing Gulliver's was on the border of Port Chester and Greenwich and so spanned the county and state line between Westchester County, New York and Fairfield County, Connecticut. Gulliver's was a restaurant and bar with its entrance on the Greenwich side. Most of Gulliver's was considered on the New York side, and had been inspected by Port Chester fire authorities two months before the fire. The other businesses in the building were considered to be in Greenwich and had not been inspected since 1964 when the last equipment was installed.

On the main floor of Gulliver's was a dining room, main bar and the kitchen. Down a short but fairly narrow flight of stairs was the lower level where the lounge was. In this area was a sunken dance floor. It was in this lower level where the late night discotheque took place. On the ground floor there was also a small barber shop and a retail store for clothing, called The Clothes Post. More importantly, there was a bowling alley that took up almost half the building.

== Fire ==
There were about 200 young people in the lower level lounge at the time of the fire, just before 1 a.m. The band was the Creation, and included Paul Caravello (who would later become drummer of Kiss under the name Eric Carr, a.k.a. The Fox). They stopped playing the song "I Wanna Know Your Name" after a waitress told them she smelled smoke. They calmly announced "There's a small fire. Please walk out quietly." The thick smoke spread so quickly that it appeared the lights had gone out. At this point, there was a panic; because of the heat, patrons on the dance floor were unable to climb the only stairs to the main floor. Paul Caravello went back into the melee to help his four bandmates who had become trapped: John and Sarita Henderson, Damon DeFeis (brother of soprano Doreen DeFeis and Virgin Steele vocalist David DeFeis), and George D. Chase. Though he was able to locate and rescue John and Sarita, the three of them having to climb over quite a few bodies in order for them to escape (because if they had tried to make for the exit in the dressing room, like Sarita had wanted, none of them would have gotten out of there), nothing could be done for Damon or George in time. The authorities never did figure out exactly where the fire started, but according to them, the flash point was somewhere near the wall separating the bar and bowling alley, under the bandstand, and that’s where George and Damon’s bodies were found. They had chosen to remain there in order to help direct the evacuation rather than try to save themselves first. Both Creation's keyboard player (Damon) and lead singer (George) perished along with 22 other patrons, crew, friends and fans.

Nineteen fire companies responded to the incident, mainly from the Port Chester and Greenwich Fire Departments, but from other Westchester and Connecticut municipalities as well. Initial attempts to enter the building were hampered by intense heat and smoke. Various reports claim it took about 90 minutes to four hours to get the fire under control.

=== Victims ===
Most of the 24 victims were found at the foot of the stairs, with some others on the sunken dance floor.

Due to most victims not being local, there is little commemoration of the tragedy.

== Investigation ==
The county medical examiner reported that many of the bodies were so charred that dental work was the only way of identifying the victims.

Autopsies revealed that all the victims died from asphyxiation. This quashed rumors that victims had been trampled to death. Also, some electric clocks were found in the rubble stopped at 1:50 showing that power had been on during the fire and that a total blackout had not occurred.

The source of the fire initially appeared to be the nursery of the bowling alley, which was located in the basement under the clothing store. The exact location of the start of the fire proved to be very important, since it determined whether New York or Connecticut authorities had responsibility for the final investigation.

Peter J. Leonard of Greenwich, an unemployed laborer and high school dropout who was 22 years old, was arrested by Connecticut authorities on July 12, 1974 on charges of setting the fire. Authorities stated that he was a frequent patron of the bowling alley and had been there early in the evening and then left when the alleys closed, returning later through a rooftop skylight with the intention of burglarizing the business. On July 16, it was announced that final building surveys revealed that the part of the nursery where the fire was set as well as the skylight where Leonard entered the alleys were both in New York State.

The bowling alley where the fire started had gone without government fire inspections for five years before the fire. The cause of this lapse appeared to be an agreement written in 1961 from the Connecticut State Fire Marshal to both municipalities involved that was forgotten about after the retirement of a Port Chester fire inspector in 1969. The agreement stated that Port Chester would take responsibility for inspecting the bowling alley because most of it was in New York State. Officials in Port Chester questioned the legality of the agreement after the fire, saying the parties who drew it up had no legal authority to do so.

== Legal process ==
=== Criminal ===
Once it was determined that the fire was set in New York, extradition was sought to bring the suspect from Connecticut to New York. Leonard waived extradition and was indicted by a Westchester County Grand Jury on July 30 on 28 counts, consisting of 24 murder charges (one for each victim), arson, burglary and two counts of petit larceny. The theory of the crime was that Leonard had burglarized some cigarette vending machines in the bowling alley and set the fire to cover up the burglary.

Leonard pleaded guilty just before his trial was due to start on June 16, 1975. Then, on his sentencing hearing on July 16, he tried to withdraw the plea. The judge refused the request to withdraw the plea and sentenced Leonard to 15 years to life imprisonment. The judge commented that Leonard had performed "stupid actions in attempting to cover up a third-rate burglary by arson, resulting in Westchester's worst tragedy." He also said "You're certainly not an all American boy, but you're not a vicious killer either."

On July 19, 1977, the guilty verdict for murder was overturned by the Appellate Court, because his confession was found to have been coerced.

He was then convicted by a jury on September 7, 1978 after 8 1/2 hours of deliberation on all 28 counts of the indictment. This guilty verdict was overturned on December 16, 1985 because the Appellate Division found that self-incriminating statements had been made without a lawyer present.

On March 25, 1986, prosecutors allowed Leonard to plead guilty to second degree manslaughter. On April 9, 1986, he was sentenced to 15 years. Under New York law, inmates with good records were released after serving two thirds of their sentence, therefore he qualified for release soon afterwards.

=== Civil ===
The first civil lawsuit began July 5, 1974 when a lawyer representing the husband of one of the victims, Jonetta Horsey, who perished in the fire, filed papers starting a $2 million suit. The filing asked that the attorney be included in the fire investigation.

By July 8, 1974, nine families had retained counsel for possible lawsuits.

On July 9, 1974, an attorney representing six families who lost loved ones filed a notice of claim for $12 million with the Village of Port Chester. The notice contended that Port Chester "was negligent and careless in failing to make proper and sufficient inspections" of both the restaurant and bowling alley. Even though the bowling alley was almost entirely in Connecticut, the attorney filing the papers said the fact that it adjoined the restaurant (which was mostly in New York) made it Port Chester's responsibility.

On July 15, 1974, it was reported that Greenwich would be served with a notice of claim for $16 million on behalf of eight victims of the fire.

== See also ==
- List of nightclub fires
