= Visions of Eden =

Studio album by Virgin Steele
- Released: September 8, 2006
- Genre: Power metal, heavy metal
- Length: 79:30
- Label: T&T / Sanctuary
- Producer: David DeFeis

Virgin Steele chronology
The Book of Burning (2002)	Visions of Eden (2006)	The Black Light Bacchanalia (2010)

Professional ratings
Review scores
Source	Rating
Imperiumi	6.5/10 stars
Metal Storm	9/10

Visions of Eden is the eleventh album by American heavy metal band Virgin Steele, released on September 8, 2006, via Sanctuary Records. The album is subtitled The Lilith Project – A Barbaric Romantic Movie of the Mind. It is a concept album based on Gnostic beliefs, which critically revisits the traditional Christian mythology about the creation of the Earth and the Biblical accounts of Adam and Eve.

The story revolves around Lilith, the first wife of Adam and a symbol of female strength and independence. Representing the female side of the true, higher god, she suffers under the lusting, jealous Demiurge who represents the Christian god, and as an emancipated woman who could not get along with the dominant Adam stands in stark contrast to Eve. Adam's second wife is portrayed as a docile, subservient partner created by the demiurge at the request of Adam, who could not cope with an independent woman on equal footing with him.

Regarding Visions of Eden, frontman David DeFeis declared: "What it really is, is the soundtrack for a major motion picture that has yet to be made! And by the hammer of Zeus, I will make this film one day. I call this work a Barbaric Romantic movie of the mind.".

In 2003, prior to the album release, the concept was performed on the theater stage by Landestheater Schwaben under the name Lilith (as were the previous Virgin Steele titles The House of Atreus Act I and The House of Atreus Act II).

On February 17, 2017, the album was reissued as a double CD containing a remixed version and a remastered recording of the original mix.

== Track listing ==
All songs written by David DeFeis

No.	Title	Length
1.	"Immortal I Stand (The Birth of Adam)"	6:33
2.	"Adorned with the Rising Cobra"	9:40
3.	"The Ineffable Name"	7:48
4.	"Black Light on Black"	7:03
5.	"Bonedust"	6:10
6.	"Angel of Death"	8:37
7.	"God Above God"	7:13
8.	"The Hidden God"	6:51
9.	"Childslayer"	5:22
10.	"When Dusk Fell"	6:57
11.	"Visions of Eden"	7:16

== Personnel ==
- David DeFeis – vocals, keyboards, orchestration, effects, producer
- Edward Pursino – guitars, bass
- Frank Gilchriest – drums
