= The Book of Burning =

Studio album by Virgin Steele
- Released: January 24, 2002
- Recorded: 1999 ("Conjuration of the Watcher"), June–August 2001
- Genre: Heavy metal, power metal
- Length: 73:34
- Label: T&T / Noise / Sanctuary
- Producer: David DeFeis

Virgin Steele chronology
Hymns to Victory (2002)	The Book of Burning (2002)	Visions of Eden (2006)

Professional ratings
Review scores
Source	Rating
AllMusic	1.5/5 stars

The Book of Burning is an album by the American heavy metal band Virgin Steele. It was released in January 2002 by Noise Records to celebrate the twentieth anniversary of the band. The album contains primarily re-arranged and re-recorded songs taken from the first two Virgin Steele albums, published only in vinyl and at the time out of print. Also included are songs written at various points in their career which had never been released.

Tracks 3, 5, 7 and 15 are re-recorded versions of songs that were written and demoed by David DeFeis and Jack Starr in 1997. "Conjuration of the Watcher" and "The Succubus" are two songs originally written in 1986 for the American all-female heavy metal band Original Sin on their debut LP Sin Will Find You Out, which were reworked and recorded by Virgin Steele in different recording sessions.

According to the CD booklet, the album was recorded from June to August 2001, except "Conjuration of the Watcher", which was recorded in 1999 during The House of Atreus Act I sessions.

The Book of Burning caused a controversy between founding members DeFeis and Starr about the format of the recording, with the result of Starr renouncing any involvement in the production of the album and in other reunion projects.

== Track listing ==
No.	Title	Writer(s)	Length
1.	"Conjuration of the Watcher" (new song recorded during The House of Atreus Act I sessions)	(David DeFeis, Edward Pursino)	4:24
2.	"Don't Say Goodbye (Tonight)" (re-recorded version)	(D. DeFeis, Jack Starr)	4:42
3.	"Rain of Fire" (new song)	(D. DeFeis)	6:27
4.	"Annihilation" (new song)	(D. DeFeis)	1:05
5.	"Hellfire Woman" (new song)	(D. DeFeis, J. Starr)	6:57
6.	"Children of the Storm" (re-recorded version)	(D. DeFeis, J. Starr)	6:19
7.	"The Chosen Ones" (new song)	(D. DeFeis, J. Starr)	8:04
8.	"The Succubus" (reworked song)	(D. DeFeis, E. Pursino)	3:15
9.	"Minuet in G Minor" (re-recorded version)	(J.S. Bach)	0:48
10.	"The Redeemer" (re-recorded version)	(D. DeFeis, J. Starr)	5:42
11.	"I Am the One" (re-recorded version)	(D. DeFeis, J. Starr)	3:48
12.	"Hot and Wild" (new recording of a previously unreleased song written during the Noble Savage sessions)	(D. DeFeis, E. Pursino)	4:05
13.	"Birth Through Fire" (re-recorded version)	(D. DeFeis)	0:39
14.	"Guardians of the Flame" (re-recorded version)	(D. DeFeis, J. Starr)	6:44
15.	"The Final Days" (new song)	(D. DeFeis, J. Starr)	5:50
16.	"A Cry in the Night" (re-recorded acoustic version)	(D. DeFeis)	4:45

== Personnel ==
=== Band members ===
- David DeFeis – vocals, keyboards, percussions, guitars, orchestration, effects, producer
- Edward Pursino – guitars, bass
- Frank Gilchriest – drums

=== Additional musicians ===
- Joshua Block – bass, guitar
- Steve Young – guitar, bass, programming, engineer, mastering
- Frank Zummo – drums
- Jim Hooper – backing vocals
