= No Turning Back (Burning Starr album) =

No Turning Back!

Studio album by Jack Starr's Burning Starr
- Released: 1986
- Recorded: Sonic Studios, Freeport, New York, February 1986
- Genres: Heavy metal, power metal
- Length: 37:47
- Labels: Napalm, Metal Mayhem
- Producers: David DeFeis, Steve Thompson

Jack Starr's Burning Starr chronology
Rock the American Way (1985)	No Turning Back! (1986)	Blaze of Glory (1987)

Singles from No Turning Back
- 1. "Fire & Rain" Released: 1986

1998 edition CD cover
- Cover art by the Brothers Hildebrandt

Professional ratings
Review scores
Source	Rating
Kerrang	4/5 stars
AllMusic	3/5 stars

No Turning Back is the second album by American heavy metal band Jack Starr's Burning Starr. It was released in 1986 by the Canadian label Napalm Records.

== Track listing ==
No.	Title	Length
1.	"No Turning Back!"	3:46
2.	"Light in the Dark"	3:39
3.	"Fire & Rain"	3:20
4.	"Call of the Wild"	4:12
5.	"Road Warrior"	3:36
6.	"Prelude in C Minor"	1:12
7.	"Evil Never Sleeps"	3:25
8.	"Path of Destruction"	3:38
9.	"M-1"	0:27
10.	"Avenging Angel"	4:06
11.	"Run for Your Life"	5:11
12.	"Coda"	1:15

== Personnel ==
- Mike Tirelli – vocals
- Jack Starr – guitar
- Keith "Thumper" Collins – bass
- Mark Edwards – drums
- David DeFeis – keyboards
