= Love Is Pain =

Love Is Pain may refer to:

- "Love Is Pain", song by Fergie from Double Dutchess
- "Love Is Pain", song by Finneas from Optimist
- "Love Is Pain", song by Girls Aloud from Out of Control
- "Love Is Pain", song by Joan Jett from I Love Rock 'n Roll
- "Love Is Pain", song by Virgin Steel from Life Among the Ruins
