= Jack Starr's Burning Starr (album) =

Studio album by Jack Starr's Burning Starr
- Released: February 1, 1989
- Genre: Heavy metal, power metal, glam metal
- Length: 37:30
- Label: U.S. Metal Records; Metal Mayhem

Jack Starr's Burning Starr chronology
Blaze of Glory (1987)	Jack Starr's Burning Starr (1989)	Defiance (2009)

Jack Starr's Burning Starr (sometimes called The Orange Album) is the fourth album by American heavy metal band Jack Starr's Burning Starr and the last one before they broke up. It was released in 1989 by U.S. Metal Records.

== Track listing ==
No.	Title	Length
1.	"Send Me an Angel"	4:47
2.	"Bad Times"	3:02
3.	"Fool for Love"	3:21
4.	"Hold Back the Night"	4:30
5.	"Love Can't Wait"	4:08
6.	"Out of the Blue"	5:09
7.	"New York Woman"	4:54
8.	"Tear Down the Wall"	3:54
9.	"Break the Ice"	3:45

== Personnel ==
- Mike Tirelli – vocals
- Jack Starr – guitar
- William Fairchild – bass
- Jim Harris – drums
- Edward Spahn – keyboards
- Joe Chinnici – harmony guitars
