= Out of the Darkness (Jack Starr album) =

Studio album by Jack Starr
- Released: 1984
- Recorded: Music America Studios, Rochester, New York and Bolognese Studios, Merrick, New York
- Genre: Heavy metal
- Length: 35:12
- Label: Passport (US); Music for Nations (UK); Roadrunner (Europe)
- Producer: Carl Canedy, Jack Starr

Jack Starr chronology
Out of the Darkness (1984)	A Minor Disturbance (1990)

Out of the Darkness is the first solo album by the American guitarist Jack Starr, originally released in 1984 through Passport Records in the US. A 30-year anniversary edition was issued by German label Limb Music in early 2014.

The song "False Messiah" was covered by American power metal band Jag Panzer on their Age of Mastery album in 1998.

== Track listing ==
All songs by Jack Starr

1. "Concrete Warrior" – 4:17
2. "False Messiah" – 5:40
3. "Scorcher" – 1:52
4. "Wild in the Streets" – 2:34
5. "Can't Let You Walk Away" – 4:52
6. "Chains of Love" – 3:30
7. "Eyes of Fire" – 2:46
8. "Odile" (instrumental) – 4:44
9. "Let's Get Crazy Again" – 3:26
10. "Amazing Grace" – 1:31 (CD bonus track)

Odile is the name of Jack Starr's wife at the time of recording the album.

== Personnel ==
- Rhett Forrester – vocals
- Jack Starr – guitar
- Gary Bordonaro – bass
- Carl Canedy – drums

Guest musicians

- Gary Driscoll – drums on track 9
- Emma Zale – additional vocals on track 2, piano and strings on tracks 5, 8
- Paul Kane – guitar on track 5
- Laura Kyle – backing vocals on tracks 5, 7
- Ned Meloni – bass on track 8
- David DeFeis – backing vocals (uncredited)

Technical personnel

- Chris Bubacz, Denny McNerney – engineers
