= The Black Light Bacchanalia =

Studio album by Virgin Steele
- Released: October 22, 2010 (Germany); October 25, 2010 (Europe); November 9, 2010 (USA)
- Recorded: The Hammer of Zeus, New York
- Genre: Power metal, heavy metal, symphonic metal
- Length: 77:22
- Label: SPV/Steamhammer
- Producer: David DeFeis

Virgin Steele chronology
Visions of Eden (2006)	The Black Light Bacchanalia (2010)	Nocturnes of Hellfire & Damnation (2015)

The Black Light Bacchanalia is the twelfth album by New York power metal group Virgin Steele. It was released via SPV/Steamhammer on October 22, 2010 in Germany, Austria and Switzerland, on October 25, 2010 in the rest of Europe, and on November 9, 2010 in the U.S.

The album is issued in CD format, limited edition digipak (with a bonus CD) and 3,000 copies worldwide boxset (with triple LP vinyl with a book, CD and extensive packaging).

With a duration of over 11 minutes, "To Crown Them with Halos (Parts 1 & 2)" was the longest track Virgin Steele had ever recorded until it was surpassed by the 13-minute "The Ritual of Descent" from their 2023 album The Passion of Dionysus.

== Track listing ==
All music and lyrics by David DeFeis

No.	Title	Length
1.	"By the Hammer of Zeus (And the Wrecking Ball of Thor)"	8:05
2.	"Pagan Heart"	6:19
3.	"The Bread of Wickedness"	3:11
4.	"In a Dream of Fire"	5:57
5.	"Nepenthe (I Live Tomorrow)"	5:20
6.	"The Orpheus Taboo"	7:43
7.	"To Crown Them with Halos (Parts 1 & 2)"	11:16
8.	"The Black Light Bacchanalia (The Age That Is to Come)"	7:19
9.	"The Torture's of the Damned"	3:00
10.	"Necropolis (He Answers Them with Death)"	9:08
11.	"Eternal Regret"	8:58

Digipak CD bonus tracks
No.	Title	Length
1.	"When I'm Silent (The Wind of Voices)"	6:00
2.	"Silent Sorrow"	4:24
3.	"From a Whisper to a Scream (The Spoken Biography)"	30:42

== Reception ==
Professional ratings
Review scores
Source	Rating
AllMusic	4/5 stars
Imperiumi	7+
Metal Hammer (GER)	6/7
Metal Storm	7.8/10

It is a long album...close to 80 minutes. The album (to be really brief) concerns the reversal of all things. Once conquered by invading cultures, older Pagan deities become the demons from the new religion. The Black Light Bacchanalia is a reversal of the sacred sexual customs, and the final desecration of the 'Goddess Principle,' switching from matrilineal descent to patrilineal descent, with the rise of the idea of the Mountain-Fire God...And it also has to do with ancient fears such as the fear of the sun not rising...Lyrically it is a kind of continuation of the story I told on the last album...Musically it is quite something else...

— David DeFeis

== Personnel ==
=== Band members ===
- David DeFeis – vocals, keyboards, orchestration, bass, producer, engineer
- Edward Pursino – six-string guitars
- Josh Block – seven-string guitars, engineer
- Frank Gilchriest – drums

=== Production ===
- Ed Warrin – engineer
