= The Smoke at Dawn =

2014 book by Jeff Shaara

The Smoke At Dawn
- First edition
- Author: Jeff Shaara
- Language: English
- Series: Civil War (1861-1865), Western Theater #3
- Subject: American Civil War
- Genre: Historical novel
- Publisher: Ballantine Books
- Publication date: 2014
- Publication place: United States
- Pages: 756
- ISBN: 978-0-8041-9442-6
- Preceded by: A Chain of Thunder
- Followed by: The Fateful Lightning

The Smoke At Dawn is a 2014 book by Jeff Shaara, the third of four in a series covering the Western Theater of the American Civil War.

== Reception ==
D. G. Schumacher, of The Sun News, found the book "riveting".
