= A Chain of Thunder =

Civil War book in a series by Jeff Shaara

- Author: Jeff Shaara
- Language: English
- Series: Civil War (1861-1865), Western Theater #2
- Subject: American Civil War
- Genre: Historical novel
- Publisher: Ballantine Books
- Publication date: 2013
- Publication place: United States
- Pages: 562
- ISBN: 9780345527387
- Preceded by: A Blaze of Glory
- Followed by: The Smoke at Dawn

A Chain of Thunder is the second volume in a 4-book series by Jeff Shaara, the set in the Western Theater of the American Civil War. This volume covers Ulysses Grant's campaign against Confederate General John Pemberton, leading to the South's crushing loss of the citadel of Vicksburg.

== Plot ==
As the war in the West turns badly for the South, the Union generals and their political commanders in Washington know that the one great barrier to Union control of the Mississippi River lies at the Confederate bastion of Vicksburg, Mississippi. Protected by high embankments, and a formidable presence of Confederate artillery, the Confederate forces there, under the command of John Pemberton, are confident that Vicksburg is a citadel that cannot fall. But Federal commander Ulysses Grant believes otherwise.

Encouraged by his superiors in Washington to do whatever it takes, Grant launches an overland campaign that avoids a direct frontal assault on the town from the river, and instead, maneuvers his army downstream, crossing from Louisiana into Mississippi where the Confederates are too weak to make an effective stand. Instead of pushing directly at Vicksburg, Grant employs an audacious strategy, slicing quickly through the Mississippi countryside toward the capital city of Jackson. Pemberton's army cannot match Grant's unpredictable moves, and the Southern forces begin to understand that their commander is no match for the ingenuity Grant brings to the campaign. Though Pemberton's superior, General Joseph Johnston arrives in Jackson, Johnston sees Pemberton's situation as hopeless, and thus, holds his own forces back from the fight, allowing Grant the freedom to focus all his energies on Vicksburg itself. Johnston's reluctance to engage Grant, and thus offer relief to Vicksburg, is one of the most controversial decisions of the war.

In May, 1863 Grant turns his enormous army toward Vicksburg, and discovers that Pemberton has not been idle. The city is protected by nine miles of entrenchments and earthworks, extending in an arc, each end anchored on the Mississippi River. After attempting two disastrous frontal assaults, Grant reluctantly accepts that the only effective way to capture the city is to besiege it. Thus, the Federal forces wrap Vicksburg in a tightening noose that Pemberton cannot hope to break through. After forty seven days, the Confederate troops, and the beleaguered civilians in the town endure hardships and privations none could have predicted, until, finally, Pemberton must accept the inevitable. It is a decision that will cause controversy for decades after, since the Confederate commander is in fact a Northerner himself, having joined the Southern cause from his home state of Pennsylvania. Many of his own troops regard Pemberton's actions as little more than treachery.

The story is told primarily through the voices of Union General William T. Sherman, and, returning from the first volume (A Blaze of Glory), the young private from Wisconsin, Fritz Bauer. On the Southern side, the story is told through the eyes of Pemberton himself, as well as a young civilian woman in the town, Lucy Spence, who serves her cause the only way she can, by volunteering for nursing duties in the makeshift hospitals, enduring the kind of horror even the doctors are not prepared for.

== Reception ==
Ralph Bowden, of The Knoxville News-Sentinel, was complementary of the well realised "human relationships" between for example Grant and Sherman, along with the "gritty details" of the war.
