= Rock the American Way =

Studio album by Jack Starr's Burning Starr
- Released: 1985
- Studios: Sonic Studios, New York, USA
- Genres: Glam metal, heavy metal
- Length: 30:47
- Labels: Passport, Metal Mayhem
- Producers: Denny McNemey and Jack Starr (tracks 1–4, 6 and 7), Sammy Bat Ain (tracks 5 and 8)

Jack Starr's Burning Starr chronology
Rock the American Way (1985)	No Turning Back (1986)

Professional ratings
Review scores
Source	Rating
metal.de	7/10
Metal Forces	75/100

Rock the American Way is the first album by American heavy metal band Jack Starr's Burning Starr. It was released in 1985 by Passport Records.

== Track listing ==
All tracks are written by Jack Starr

No.	Title	Length
1.	"Rock and Roll is the American Way"	3:52
2.	"In Your Arms Again"	3:47
3.	"Woman"	3:16
4.	"Heat of the Night"	4:04
5.	"Born to Rock"	4:00
6.	"She's on Fire"	4:02
7.	"Live Fast, Rock Hard"	4:01
8.	"Fight the Thunder"	3:45

== Personnel ==
=== Jack Starr's Burning Starr ===
- Frank Vestry – vocals
- Jack Starr – guitar
- John Rodriguez – bass, backing vocals
- Tony Galtieri – drums

=== Additional personnel ===
- Gary Ivara, Kurt Fairchild, Mike Pont – "Barbarian Choir" on tracks 1, 5 and 8
- Tommy Farese – backing vocals on track 6
- Greg D'Angelo – drums on track 1
- George Tebitts – harmony guitars on track 2
- Bruno Ravel – bass on track 2
- Sammy Bat Ain – tambourine on track 2

=== Production ===
- Arranged by Jack Starr
- Tracks 1–4, 6 and 7 produced by Jack Starr and Denny McNerney; tracks 5 and 8 produced by Sammy Bat Ain
- Recorded and mixed by Denny McNerney at Sonic Sound; track 1 remixed by Beethoven Studios
- Mastered at Sterling Sound
- All songs published by American Metal Music/In-Complete Music
