= Magick Fire Music =

EP by Virgin Steele
- Released: June 14, 2000
- Recorded: Media Recording, The Bellmores, New York
- Genre: Power metal, heavy metal
- Length: 31:01
- Label: T&T / Noise
- Producer: David DeFeis

Virgin Steele chronology
The House of Atreus Act I (1999)	Magick Fire Music (2000)	The House of Atreus Act II (2000)

Magick Fire Music is an EP released in 2000 by the American heavy metal band Virgin Steele, promoting the then-upcoming studio album The House of Atreus Act II.

This EP includes an outtake from "The House of Atreus" project: "Agamemnon's Last Hour".

== Tracklisting ==
No.	Title	Length
1.	"Wings of Vengeance"	5:12
2.	"Flames of thy Power (From Blood They Rise)"	5:38
3.	"Prometheus the Fallen One (Savage-Unbound Mix)"	7:48
4.	"Gates of Kings (New-Alternate/Acoustic Version)"	6:35
5.	"Agamemnon's Last Hour (Silver Sided Death)"	1:15
6.	"Great Sword of Flame (Psycho-Rough Mix)"	4:32

== Personnel ==
- David DeFeis – vocals, keyboards, synth-bass, producer
- Edward Pursino – guitars, bass
- Frank Gilchriest – drums
