= The Passion of Dionysus =

Studio album by Virgin Steele
- Released: June 30, 2023
- Genres: Power metal, heavy metal, symphonic metal
- Length: 79:47
- Label: SPV/Steamhammer
- Producer: David DeFeis

Virgin Steele chronology
Seven Devils Moonshine (2018)	The Passion of Dionysus (2023)

The Passion of Dionysus is the fifteenth album by New York heavy/power metal group Virgin Steele, released via SPV/Steamhammer worldwide on June 30, 2023.

The concept album tells the story of the Greek god Dionysus and his coming to Thebes to avenge the slander of his mother how it is described in Euripides' tragic play, The Bacchae. It explores the duality of the human emotional world between the rational and the irrational, thus taking up one of the most important themes of the German philosopher Friedrich Nietzsche.

The album received mostly positive reviews, but was also met with some criticism. While many critics praised the complex compositions as well as the innovative songwriting, the production was often criticized for being too artificial. Paul Hutchings of Metaltalk.net called The Passion of Dionysus a "creative masterpiece".

With a duration of almost 13 minutes, "The Ritual of Descent" is the longest single track the band has ever released.

== Track listing ==
All music and lyrics by David DeFeis

No.	Title	Length
1.	"The Gethsemane Effect"	07:08
2.	"You'll Never See the Sun Again"	09:20
3.	"A Song of Possession"	05:51
4.	"The Ritual of Descent"	12:41
5.	"Spiritual Warfare"	07:50
6.	"Black Earth & Blood"	02:24
7.	"The Passion of Dionysus"	08:09
8.	"To Bind & Kill a God"	08:18
9.	"Unio Mystica"	09:15
10.	"I Will Fear No Man for I Am a God"	08:46

== Reception ==
Professional ratings
Review scores
Source	Rating
Metal Temple	8/10 stars
Maximum Volume	8/10 stars
The Metal Circus	7/10 stars
Metalhead	7/10 stars
Blabbermouth	7/10 stars
Metal Factory	7/10 stars
Tutto Rock Magazine	7/10 stars
Metal Hammer	5/7 stars
Via Nocturna	83%

For those who have followed VIRGIN STEELE all these years, this will not be unfamiliar terrain at all. This will be what they were expecting. High quality music brought to us by an extremely dedicated David DeFeis, who did all of it, except for the guitar parts. And I for one applaud him, because he has made “The Passion Of Dionysus” into a very good record, making sure that VIRGIN STEELE is once again noticed as a force to be reckoned with.

— Metal-Temple.com

== Personnel ==
- David DeFeis - all vocals, keyboards, orchestration, bass, drums, producer, engineer
- Edward Pursino - 6 string guitars
- Josh Block - 7 string guitars, engineer
