= Guardians of the Flame (album) =

Studio album by Virgin Steele
- Released: July 1983
- Recorded: 1983
- Studio: Sonic Sound Studios, Freeport, New York
- Genre: Heavy metal
- Length: 41:38
- Label: Music for Nations (UK); Roadrunner (Europe); Mongol Horde (US); King (Japan)
- Producer: David DeFeis

Virgin Steele chronology
Virgin Steele (1982)	Guardians of the Flame (1983)	Wait for the Night (1983)

2002 edition CD cover

Professional ratings
Review scores
Source	Rating
AllMusic	3/5 stars
The Collector's Guide to Heavy Metal	6/10
Imperiumi	9/10 stars
Metal Forces	8/10

Guardians of the Flame is the second album from New York power metal band Virgin Steele, released in 1983 by Music for Nations. Sanctuary reissued the album in 2002 with songs previously released in the EP Wait for the Night, a live recording, and an interview with the band.

== Track listing ==
Side one
No.	Title	Writer(s)	Length
1.	"Don't Say Goodbye (Tonight)"	(David DeFeis)	4:23
2.	"Burn the Sun"	(Jack Starr)	4:24
3.	"Life of Crime"	(Starr)	4:40
4.	"The Redeemer"	(DeFeis, Starr)	7:05

Side two
No.	Title	Writer(s)	Length
5.	"Birth Through Fire" (instrumental)	(DeFeis)	0:40
6.	"Guardians of the Flame"	(DeFeis, Starr)	6:45
7.	"Metal City"	(Starr)	4:12
8.	"Hell or High Water"	(Starr)	3:17
9.	"Go All the Way"	(Starr)	3:11
10.	"A Cry in the Night"	(DeFeis)	4:05

2002 CD reissue bonus tracks
No.	Title	Writer(s)	Length
11.	"I Am the One"	(DeFeis, Starr)	3:47
12.	"Go Down Fighting"	(Starr)	3:30
13.	"Wait for the Night"	(Starr)	4:19
14.	"Interview"	(DeFeis)	6:42
15.	"Blues Deluxe Oreganata (I Might Drown)" (live)	(DeFeis, Edward Pursino)	6:13

2018 CD reissue bonus tracks
No.	Title	Writer(s)	Length
11.	"I Am the One"	(DeFeis, Starr)	3:47
12.	"Go Down Fighting"	(Starr)	3:30
13.	"Wait for the Night"	(Starr)	4:19
14.	"Great Sword of Flame" (live)		6:40
15.	"Rising Unchained" (alternate version)		5:55
16.	"Blighted Spring" (new bonus track)		2:22
17.	"Self Crucifixion" (demo)		4:00
18.	"Love & Death" (demo)		4:21

== Personnel ==
=== Virgin Steele ===
- David DeFeis – vocals, keyboards, producer
- Jack Starr – guitars
- Joe O'Reilly – bass
- Joey Ayvazian – drums

=== Production ===
- Jerry Comito – engineer
- Alvaro Falcon – engineer
