= A Blaze of Glory =

2012 novel by Jeff Shaara

- Author: Jeff Shaara
- Language: English
- Series: Civil War (1861–1865), Western Theater #1
- Subject: American Civil War
- Genre: Historical novel
- Publisher: Ballantine Books
- Publication date: 2012
- Publication place: United States
- Pages: 464
- ISBN: 978-0-345-52735-6
- Followed by: A Chain of Thunder

A Blaze of Glory is the first volume in a four-book series by Jeff Shaara, set in the Western Theater of the American Civil War. The book covers the Battle of Shiloh. The title comes from a quote from future President James Garfield, who was present at the battle.

The novel takes place in the Spring of 1862 and focuses on Confederate Generals Albert Sidney Johnston and P. G. T. Beauregard, as well as then Colonel Nathan Bedford Forrest; and Union Generals Ulysses S. Grant, Don Carlos Buell, and William Tecumseh Sherman at the Battle of Shiloh.
