= Blaze of Glory (Burning Starr album) =

Studio album by Jack Starr's Burning Starr
- Released: 1987
- Genre: Heavy metal, power metal
- Length: 43:42
- Label: U.S. Metal Records; Metal Mayhem

Jack Starr's Burning Starr chronology
No Turning Back (1986)	Blaze of Glory (1987)	Jack Starr's Burning Starr (1989)

Blaze of Glory is the third album by American heavy metal band Jack Starr's Burning Starr. It was released in 1987 by U.S. Metal Records.

== Track listing ==
No.	Title	Length
1.	"New York Woman" (CD release bonus track)	4:58
2.	"Tear Down the Wall" (CD release bonus track)	3:58
3.	"Stand Up and Fight"	5:00
4.	"Overdrive"	3:36
5.	"Blaze of Glory"	3:48
6.	"F.F.Z. (Free Fire Zone)"	2:04
7.	"Go Down Fighting"	3:29
8.	"Burning Starr"	2:58
9.	"Mad at the World"	3:04
10.	"Mercy Killer"	3:50
11.	"Metal Generation"	4:09
12.	"Excursion"	2:48

2017 reissue
No.	Title	Length
11.	"New York Woman"	4:58
12.	"Tear Down the Wall"	3:57
13.	"Return from the Ashes / Personal Demons"	4:47
14.	"Blaze of Glory" (Live 2013)	3:54
15.	"Go Down Fighting" (Live 2013)	4:31

== Personnel ==
- Mike Tirelli – vocals
- Jack Starr – guitar
- William Fairchild – bass
- Jim Harris – drums
- Ed Spahn – keyboards
- Joe Chinnici – harmony guitars
