= Wait for the Night =

EP by Virgin Steele
- Released: December 1983
- Genre: Heavy metal
- Length: 15:43
- Label: Mongol Horde, Music for Nations
- Producer: David DeFeis

Virgin Steele chronology
Guardians of the Flame (1983)	Wait for the Night (1983)	Noble Savage (1985)

A Cry in the Night cover

Wait for the Night is an EP released in 1983 by American heavy metal band Virgin Steele promoting the album Guardians of the Flame. It was released in Europe by Music for Nations with a different cover, a different track listing and the name A Cry in the Night. It is the last release of the band with guitarist Jack Starr.

A compilation of songs from the EP and from Guardians of the Flame was published in Canada by Maze Music with the title Burn the Sun, in 1984.

The three original songs plus the interview from the European version were included as bonus material in the Guardians of the Flame CD remaster in 2002.

== Track listing ==
No.	Title	Length
1.	"Don't Say Goodbye (Tonight)" (remix)	4:17
2.	"I Am the One"	3:45
3.	"Go Down Fighting"	3:27
4.	"Wait for the Night"	4:14

European version
No.	Title	Length
1.	"A Cry in the Night" (remix)	4:05
2.	"Go Down Fighting"	3:27
3.	"I Am the One"	3:45
4.	"Interview" (by Mark Snider)	6:42

== Personnel ==
=== Band members ===
- David DeFeis – vocals, keyboards, producer
- Jack Starr – guitars
- Joe O'Reilly – bass
- Joey Ayvazian – drums
