= Age of Consent (album) =

Studio album by Virgin Steele
- Released: October 11, 1988
- Recorded: December 1987 – July 1988
- Studio: BearTracks Studios, Suffern, New York, Sonic Sound and Studio 3973, Freeport, New York
- Genre: Heavy metal, power metal
- Length: 47:59
- Label: Maze Music
- Producer: Chris Bubacz and David DeFeis

Virgin Steele chronology
Noble Savage (1986)	Age of Consent (1988)	Life Among the Ruins (1993)

1997 edition CD cover

Professional ratings
Review scores
Source	Rating
AllMusic	4/5 stars
Imperiumi	7/10 stars
The Metal Crypt	3.5/5 stars
Metal.it	8.5/10 stars

Age of Consent is the fourth full-length album by the American heavy metal band Virgin Steele. The album took eight months to complete, a change from Noble Savage which was recorded in only a few weeks, and was finally released in October 1988. It received scarce promotion and distribution by their small label, resulting in very low sales. The songs of this album follow in style and content the music of the previous album Noble Savage, adding a more polished sound and production. At the time of release, the band faced legal and financial setbacks that brought to the unofficial disbandment of Virgin Steele. Joe O'Reilly, although credited for playing bass on the album, was ill at the time of recording and was ghosted by DeFeis and Pursino.

The album was reissued on CD in 1997 by Noise Records, with a new song listing, a new cover and many bonus tracks. In November 2011 Age of Consent was once again reissued by Steamhammer Records, a subsidiary of SPV, with the same track list as the 1997 release, but with an added bonus CD (named Under the Graveyard Moon) containing 7 additional tracks.

== Track listing ==
All lyrics by David DeFeis except "Stay on Top", "Desert Plains", "Screaming for Vengeance", "Breach of Lease", and "Down by the River"

Original release
No.	Title	Music	Length
1.	"On the Wings of the Night"	DeFeis	4:41
2.	"Seventeen"	DeFeis, Edward Pursino	4:19
3.	"Tragedy"	DeFeis, Pursino	4:21
4.	"Stay on Top" (Uriah Heep cover)	Tom Jackson	3:37
5.	"Chains of Fire"	DeFeis, Pursino	3:35
6.	"The Burning of Rome (Cry for Pompeii)"	DeFeis, Pursino	6:39
7.	"Let It Roar"	DeFeis, Pursino	4:49
8.	"Lion in Winter"	DeFeis	5:32
9.	"Cry Forever"	DeFeis	4:32
10.	"We Are Eternal"	DeFeis, Pursino	4:10

1997 Noise Records CD reissue
No.	Title	Music	Length
1.	"The Burning of Rome (Cry for Pompeii)"	DeFeis, Pursino	6:39
2.	"Let It Roar"	DeFeis, Pursino	4:49
3.	"Prelude to Evening"	DeFeis	1:10
4.	"Lion in Winter"	DeFeis	5:32
5.	"Stranger at the Gate"	DeFeis	1:28
6.	"Perfect Mansions (Mountains of the Sun)"	DeFeis, Pursino	8:32
7.	"Coils of the Serpent"	DeFeis	1:24
8.	"Serpent's Kiss"	DeFeis	8:15
9.	"On the Wings of the Night"	DeFeis	4:41
10.	"Seventeen"	DeFeis, Pursino	4:19
11.	"Tragedy"	DeFeis, Pursino	4:21
12.	"Stay on Top" (Uriah Heep cover)	Jackson	3:37
13.	"Chains of Fire"	DeFeis, Pursino	3:35
14.	"Desert Plains" (Judas Priest cover)	Glenn Tipton, Rob Halford, K.K. Downing	4:52
15.	"Cry Forever"	DeFeis	4:32
16.	"We Are Eternal"	DeFeis, Pursino	4:10
Total length:			71:08

2008 Dockyard 1 remastered edition bonus tracks
No.	Title	Music	Length
17.	"Screaming for Vengeance" (Judas Priest cover)	Glenn Tipton, Rob Halford, K.K. Downing	5:11
18.	"The Curse"	DeFeis, Pursino	2:55
Total length:			79:14

2011 SPV reissue bonus CD (Under the Graveyard Moon)
No.	Title	Music	Length
1.	"Screaming for Vengeance" (Judas Priest cover)	Glenn Tipton, Rob Halford, K.K. Downing	5:11
2.	"The Curse"	DeFeis, Pursino	2:57
3.	"Breach of Lease" (Bloodrock cover)	John Nitzinger, Jim Rutledge, Rick Cobb, Ed Grundy	5:58
4.	"Another Nail in the Cross"	DeFeis, Dave Ferrara	6:24
5.	"A Changeling Dawn (Noble Savage Acoustic Version)"	DeFeis	10:56
6.	"Under the Graveyard Moon"	DeFeis	6:53
7.	"Down by the River" (Neil Young cover)	Neil Young	5:43
Total length:			44:02

== Personnel ==
=== Band members ===
- David DeFeis – vocals, keyboards, producer
- Ed Pursino – guitars, bass
- Joe O'Reilly – bass
- Joey Ayvazian – drums

=== Production ===
- Chris Bubacz – producer, engineer
- Al Falcon – engineer
- Doug Rose – assistant engineer
- Zoran Busic – executive producer
