= Life Among the Ruins =

Studio album by Virgin Steele
- Released: 1993
- Studio: Total Recall, Baldwin, Nassau County, New York; Studio Works, Island Park, New York; 2econd City, Glen Cove, New York; BearTracks Studios, Suffern, New York
- Genre: Hard rock, glam metal
- Length: 59:28
- Label: Shark Records
- Producer: David DeFeis, Ed Pursino, Chris Bubacz, Virgin Steele

Virgin Steele chronology
| Age of Consent (1988) | Life Among the Ruins (1993) | The Marriage of Heaven and Hell Part I (1995) |

Alternative CD cover

Professional ratings
Review scores
| Source | Rating |
|---|---|
| AllMusic | 3/5 stars |
| Collector's Guide to Heavy Metal | 7/10 |
| Imperiumi | 6.5/10 stars |

Life Among the Ruins is the fifth full-length studio album by American heavy metal band Virgin Steele. It was released in 1993, after almost five years of inactivity. It is the first album with bassist Rob DeMartino, who replaced Joe O'Reilly, retired from the scene.

The song "Snakeskin Voodoo Man" was present only in the American release and was instead released as a single in 1992 in Europe, at the same time of the VHS Tale of the Snakeskin Voodoo Man. The VHS featured videos for "Snakeskin Voodoo Man", "Love Is Pain", "Invitation-I Dress in Black" and "Cage of Angels-Never Believed in Good-Bye", interviews and backstage footage.

The music of this album is bluesy hard rock and melodic metal, more similar to early Whitesnake's recordings than the epic power metal of albums like Noble Savage and the following The Marriage of Heaven and Hell Part I.

== Track listing ==
All lyrics by David DeFeis, music as indicated

| No. | Title | Writer(s) | Length |
|---|---|---|---|
| 1. | "Sex Religion Machine" | (DeFeis, Ed Pursino) | 4:43 |
| 2. | "Love Is Pain" | (DeFeis) | 3:53 |
| 3. | "Jet Black" | (DeFeis, Pursino) | 4:13 |
| 4. | "Invitation" | (DeFeis) | 1:16 |
| 5. | "I Dress in Black (Woman with No Shadow)" | (DeFeis) | 4:46 |
| 6. | "Crown of Thorns" | (DeFeis, Pursino) | 6:28 |
| 7. | "Cage of Angels" (instrumental) | (DeFeis) | 0:54 |
| 8. | "Never Believed in Good-Bye" | (DeFeis) | 4:23 |
| 9. | "Too Hot to Handle" | (DeFeis, Pursino) | 4:39 |
| 10. | "Love's Gone" | (DeFeis, Pursino, Teddy Cook) | 4:29 |
| 11. | "Snakeskin Voodoo Man" (American bonus track) | (Dave Ferrara, Pursino, Joey Ayvazian, Rob DeMartino) | 5:16 |
| 12. | "Wild Fire Woman" | (DeFeis, Pursino) | 4:43 |
| 13. | "Cry Forever" | (DeFeis) | 4:32 |
| 14. | "Haunting the Last Hours" (instrumental) | (DeFeis) | 0:54 |
| 15. | "Last Rose of Summer" | (DeFeis) | 4:19 |

2012 CD remastered reissue bonus tracks
| No. | Title | Length |
|---|---|---|
| 16. | "Snakeskin Voodoo Man" (live acoustic rehearsal version) | 4:02 |
| 17. | "Jet Black" (live acoustic rehearsal version) | 4:18 |
| 18. | "Purple Rain" (live acoustic rehearsal version) | 4:49 |
| 19. | "Wildfire Woman" (live acoustic rehearsal version) | 4:35 |

Disc 2 (The "My Mourning Clothes" CD)
| No. | Title | Length |
|---|---|---|
| 1. | "When the Levee Breaks" (Led Zeppelin cover) | 6:39 |
| 2. | "Sympathy for the Devil" (Rolling Stones cover) | 4:19 |
| 3. | "My Mourning Clothes" | 7:51 |
| 4. | "Mambo Sun" | 3:42 |
| 5. | "Ballrooms of Mars" | 3:28 |

The Vertical Soul Suite
| No. | Title | Length |
|---|---|---|
| 6. | "Wild Thing" | 1:46 |
| 7. | "The Moonrise in your Skin" | 0:55 |
| 8. | "Wild Thing Reprise" | 0:57 |
| 9. | "The Magick in your Sin" | 1:12 |

| No. | Title | Length |
|---|---|---|
| 10. | "Sex Religion Machine" (Rare New York Mix) | 4:44 |
| 11. | "Jet Black" (Rare New York Mix) | 4:11 |
| 12. | "Crown Of Thorns" (Rare New York Mix) | 6:29 |
| 13. | "Cage Of Angels" (Rare New York Mix) | 0:54 |
| 14. | "Never Believed In Goodbye" (Rare New York Mix) | 4:24 |
| 15. | "Love Is Pain" (Rare New York Mix) | 3:53 |
| 16. | "Invitation" (Rare New York Mix) | 1:14 |
| 17. | "I Dress In Black (Woman With No Shadow)" (Rare New York Mix) | 4:44 |
| 18. | "Too Hot To Handle" (Rare New York Mix) | 4:38 |
| 19. | "Love's Gone" (Rare New York Mix) | 4:27 |
| 20. | "Flesh And Blood" (Rare Never Released Demo) | 4:41 |

== Personnel ==
=== Band members ===
- David DeFeis – vocals, keyboards
- Ed Pursino – guitars, bass
- Rob DeMartino – bass
- Joey Ayvazian – drums

=== Additional musicians ===
- Teddy Cook – bass on tracks 2, 5, 8, 9, 10, 12
- Dave Ferrara – lead guitar on track 11

=== Production ===
- Virgin Steele – producers on tracks 1, 3, 6, 7, 8, 11
- DeFeis / Pursino – producers on tracks 2, 4, 5, 9, 10, 12, 14
- DeFeis / Chris Bubacz – producers on tracks 13, 15
