= Invictus (Virgin Steele album) =

Studio album by Virgin Steele
- Released: April 20, 1998
- Recorded: Media Recording, The Bellmores, New York
- Genre: Power metal, heavy metal
- Length: 75:35
- Label: T&T / Noise
- Producer: David DeFeis, Steve Young

Virgin Steele chronology
The Marriage of Heaven and Hell Part II (1996)	Invictus (1998)	The House of Atreus Act I (1999)

Invictus is the eighth studio album from New York-based power metal band Virgin Steele, released in 1998. It is the third part of The Marriage of Heaven and Hell saga, exploring the relationships and conflicts between humanity and divinity. The album's name is Latin for Unconquered.

== Track listing ==
All tracks by David DeFeis except "Defiance" by DeFeis / Edward Pursino

No.	Title	Length
1.	"The Blood of Vengeance"	1:54
2.	"Invictus"	5:35
3.	"Mind, Body, Spirit"	7:18
4.	"In the Arms of the Death God" (instrumental)	1:19
5.	"Through Blood and Fire"	5:30
6.	"Sword of the Gods"	7:33
7.	"God of Our Sorrows"	1:19
8.	"Vow of Honour"	1:02
9.	"Defiance"	6:30
10.	"Dust from the Burning"	4:32
11.	"Amaranth" (instrumental)	0:22
12.	"A Whisper of Death"	8:52
13.	"Dominion Day"	6:35
14.	"A Shadow of Fear"	6:11
15.	"Theme from 'The Marriage of Heaven and Hell'" (instrumental)	0:22
16.	"Veni, Vidi, Vici"	10:41

=== 2014 remastered 2nd CD: Fire Spirits (Bonus Tracks - Acoustic Versions) ===
Dark Distant Future - Live Rehearsal Great Hall Medley #1
No.	Title	Length
1.	"A Whisper of Death (Intro)"	1:59
2.	"Unholy Water"	3:42
3.	"Trail of Tears"	6:56

With Vengeance Divine - Live in the Studio Medley #2
No.	Title	Length
4.	"Rising Unchained"	3:04
5.	"Veni, Vidi, Vici"	6:18
6.	"Defiance"	3:35
7.	"I Will Come for You"	3:10
8.	"Victory Is Mine"	4:15

Conquering Hero - Live Fireplace Rehearsal Medley #3
No.	Title	Length
9.	"Serpent's Kiss (Intro)"	1:58
10.	"A Whisper of Death (Main Section of the Song)"	2:08
11.	"Great Sword of Flame"	2:04
12.	"Emalaith"	4:29
13.	"The Burning of Rome (Cry for Pompeii)"	2:43
14.	"Perfect Mansions (Mountains of the Sun)"	6:07
15.	"Do You Walk with God"	4:54

== Personnel ==
Band members

- David DeFeis – vocals, keyboards, orchestration, effects, producer
- Edward Pursino – guitars
- Rob DeMartino – bass
- Frank Gilchriest – drums

Production

- Steve Young – producer, engineer, mixing
- Michael Sarsfield – mastering
