= Land of the Dead (album) =

- Cover art by Ken Kelly

Studio album by Jack Starr's Burning Starr
- Released: November 11, 2011
- Recorded: 2011
- Genre: Heavy metal, power metal
- Length: 60:30
- Label: Limb Music
- Producer: Bart Gabriel

Jack Starr's Burning Starr chronology
Defiance (2009)	Land of the Dead (2011)	Stand Your Ground (2017)

Land of the Dead is the sixth album by American heavy metal band Jack Starr's Burning Starr. It was released on November 11, 2011, by Limb Music. Guest musicians include Ross the Boss and David Shankle. The artwork was made by Ken Kelly.

== Track listing ==
No.	Title	Length
1.	"Land of the Dead"	6:29
2.	"Sands of Time"	5:12
3.	"Twilight of the Gods"	2:33
4.	"Stranger in paradise"	5:38
5.	"Here We Are"	4:38
6.	"Warning Fire"	5:23
7.	"Daughter of Darkness"	6:57
8.	"When Blood and Steel Collide"	6:39
9.	"On the Wings of the Night"	4:40
10.	"Never Again"	5:48
11.	"Until the End"	6:41

== Personnel ==
- Todd Michael Hall – vocals
- Jack Starr – guitar
- Ned Meloni – bass
- Kenny "Rhino" Earl – drums
- Robert (Fuji) Barbour – all rhythm guitars, lead and harmony guitars, production
- Marta Gabriel – keyboards
- Ross The Boss – guest guitar solo on "Warning Fire"
- David Shankle – guest guitar solo on "Never Again"
