= Nocturnes of Hellfire & Damnation =

Studio album by Virgin Steele
- Released: June 19, 2015
- Genre: Heavy metal, power metal
- Length: 79:00
- Label: SPV/Steamhammer
- Producer: David DeFeis

Virgin Steele chronology
The Black Light Bacchanalia (2010)	Nocturnes of Hellfire & Damnation (2015)	Seven Devils Moonshine (2018)

Nocturnes of Hellfire & Damnation is the thirteenth album by New York heavy/power metal group Virgin Steele, released via SPV/Steamhammer on June 19, 2015.

The album is issued in CD format, limited edition digipak (with a bonus CD), and a double LP vinyl set.

== Reception ==
Professional ratings
Review scores
Source	Rating
Dangerdog	4/5
Imperiumi	3.5/10
Metal Storm	8.2/10

If you were as letdown by The Black Light Bacchanalia as I was, then I can certainly assure you of a certainly more focused and notable effort in Nocturnes of Hellfire & Damnation. While reading a recent post from Metal Sucks about these guys, I noticed that a commenter asked the question, "How did this band ever get signed?" Well, my answer to that is quite simple. You'll just have to take a listen to this album.

— Tony Shrum of New Noise Magazine

== Track listing ==
All music and lyrics by David DeFeis

No.	Title	Length
1.	"Lucifer's Hammer"	5:41
2.	"Queen of the Dead"	4:19
3.	"To Darkness Eternal"	0:57
4.	"Black Sun-Black Mass"	5:08
5.	"Persephone"	7:28
6.	"Devilhead"	5:22
7.	"Demolition Queen"	8:16
8.	"The Plague and the Fire"	6:30
9.	"We Disappear"	7:54
10.	"A Damned Apparition"	1:33
11.	"Glamour"	5:19
12.	"Delirium"	7:33
13.	"Hymns to Damnation"	6:55
14.	"Fallen Angels"	6:05

=== Limited edition digipak, CD 2 ===
The Samhain Suite
No.	Title	Length
1.	"Halloween Theme"	1:20
2.	"D.O.A." (Bloodrock cover)	7:49
3.	"The Witch in the Forest"	0:54
4.	"Black Sabbath" (Black Sabbath cover)	6:16
5.	"The Immigrant Song" (Led Zeppelin cover)	1:17
6.	"Black Sabbath 'Reprise'"	1:05

No.	Title	Length
7.	"Riderless Horse (Save Your Breath)"	7:23
8.	"The Devil Drives"	7:01
9.	"Anger Never Dies"	6:12
10.	"Funeral Games"	7:28
11.	"The Plot Thickens"	0:51
12.	"Haunted Wolfshine"	6:14
13.	"West of Sumer"	7:53
14.	"A Greater Burning of Innocence"	5:43
15.	"The Birth of Beauty"	6:04

== Personnel ==
Virgin Steele

- David DeFeis – vocals, keyboards, orchestration, producer, engineer
- Edward Pursino – guitars
- Josh Block – guitars, bass, engineer
- Frank Gilchriest – drums

Production

- Ed Warrin – engineer
