= Virgin Steele (album) =

Studio album by Virgin Steele
- Released: December 1982
- Recorded: September 1982
- Studio: Studio 3973, Freeport, New York
- Genre: Heavy metal
- Length: 41:15
- Label: Virgin Steele Records (U.S.); Music for Nations (Europe); Maze Records (Canada)
- Producer: David DeFeis

Virgin Steele chronology
| Virgin Steele (1982) | Guardians of the Flame (1983) |

Professional ratings
Review scores
| Source | Rating |
|---|---|
| AllMusic | 2.5/5 stars |
| Collector's Guide to Heavy Metal | 5/10 |
| Imperiumi | 7/10 stars |

Virgin Steele is the debut album by New York heavy metal band Virgin Steele, released independently in 1982. This was the first album released by Music for Nations in Europe and was subsequently released by Mongol Horde Records and Maze Records in Canada. Music for Nations pressed 5,000 copies of the original LP. Sanctuary Records reissued the album on CD in 2002, with bonus tracks and some previously unreleased demos.

== Track listing ==
Side one
| No. | Title | Writer(s) | Length |
|---|---|---|---|
| 1. | "Minuet in G Minor / Danger Zone" | David DeFeis, Jack Starr | 4:29 |
| 2. | "American Girl" | Starr | 2:51 |
| 3. | "Dead End Kids" | DeFeis, Starr | 3:25 |
| 4. | "Drive On Thru" | Starr | 3:11 |
| 5. | "Still in Love with You" | DeFeis, Starr | 6:17 |

Side two
| No. | Title | Writer(s) | Length |
|---|---|---|---|
| 6. | "Children of the Storm" | DeFeis, Starr | 6:26 |
| 7. | "Pictures on You" | DeFeis, Starr, Joe O'Reilly, Joey Ayvazian | 3:29 |
| 8. | "Pulverizer" | Starr | 2:10 |
| 9. | "Living in Sin" | DeFeis, Starr | 3:49 |
| 10. | "Virgin Steele" | DeFeis, Starr | 4:39 |

=== 2002 CD remaster ===
| No. | Title | Writer(s) | Length |
|---|---|---|---|
| 1. | "Minuet in G Minor / Danger Zone" | (David DeFeis, Jack Starr) | 4:29 |
| 2. | "American Girl" | (Starr) | 2:51 |
| 3. | "Dead End Kids" | (DeFeis, Starr) | 3:25 |
| 4. | "Drive On Thru" | (Starr) | 3:11 |
| 5. | "Lothlorien" (previously unreleased bonus track from the Virgin Steele sessions) | (DeFeis) | 2:08 |
| 6. | "Still in Love with You" | (DeFeis, Starr) | 6:17 |
| 7. | "Children of the Storm" | (DeFeis, Starr) | 6:26 |
| 8. | "Pictures on You" | (DeFeis, Starr, Joe O'Reilly, Joey Ayvazian) | 3:29 |
| 9. | "Pulverizer" | (Starr) | 2:10 |
| 10. | "Living in Sin" | (DeFeis, Starr) | 3:49 |
| 11. | "Virgin Steele" | (DeFeis, Starr) | 4:39 |
| 12. | "The Lesson" (Previously Unreleased 4trk Demo) | | 5:58 |
| 13. | "Life of Crime" (Previously Unreleased 4trk Demo) | | 4:29 |
| 14. | "Burn the Sun" (Previously Unreleased 4trk Demo) | | 4:06 |
| 15. | "American Girl" (Original Mix) | | 2:52 |
| 16. | "Dead End Kids" (New Mix) | | 3:28 |
| 17. | "Drive On Thru" (Original Mix) | | 3:12 |
| 18. | "Living in Sin" (Original Mix) | | 3:46 |

=== 2018 CD remaster ===
| No. | Title | Writer(s) | Length |
|---|---|---|---|
| 1. | "Minuet in G Minor" | (David DeFeis, Jack Starr) | :46 |
| 2. | "Danger Zone" | (David DeFeis, Jack Starr) | 3:42 |
| 3. | "American Girl" | (Starr) | 2:51 |
| 4. | "Dead End Kids" | (DeFeis, Starr) | 3:25 |
| 5. | "Drive On Thru" | (Starr) | 3:11 |
| 6. | "Still in Love with You" | (DeFeis, Starr) | 6:17 |
| 7. | "Children of the Storm" | (DeFeis, Starr) | 6:26 |
| 8. | "Pictures on You" | (DeFeis, Starr, Joe O'Reilly, Joey Ayvazian) | 3:29 |
| 9. | "Pulverizer" | (Starr) | 2:10 |
| 10. | "Living in Sin" | (DeFeis, Starr) | 3:49 |
| 11. | "Virgin Steele" | (DeFeis, Starr) | 4:39 |
| 12. | "The Lesson" (Remastered Demo) | | 5:58 |
| 13. | "Life of Crime" (Remastered Demo) | | 4:29 |
| 14. | "Burn the Sun" (Remastered Demo) | | 4:06 |
| 15. | "American Girl" (Remastered Original Mix) | | 2:52 |
| 16. | "Dead End Kids" (New Mix) | | 3:28 |
| 17. | "Drive On Thru" (Remastered Original Mix) | | 3:12 |
| 18. | "Living in Sin" (Remastered Original Mix) | | 3:46 |
| 19. | "A Token of My Hatred" (Live) | | 9:20 |

== Personnel ==
=== Virgin Steele ===
- David DeFeis – vocals, keyboards, producer
- Jack Starr – guitars
- Joe O'Reilly – bass
- Joey Ayvazian – drums

=== Production ===
- Alvaro Falcon – engineer
- Steve Young – engineer, remastering
