= The Marriage of Heaven and Hell Part I =

Studio album by Virgin Steele
- Released: January 23, 1995 (Europe), February 8, 1995 (Japan)
- Recorded: 1994
- Studio: Media Recording, Babylon, New York
- Genre: Power metal, heavy metal
- Length: 70:25
- Label: T&T / Noise
- Producer: David DeFeis, Axel Thubeauville

Virgin Steele chronology
Life Among the Ruins (1993)	The Marriage of Heaven and Hell Part I (1995)	The Marriage of Heaven and Hell Part II (1996)

Professional ratings
Review scores
Source	Rating
AllMusic	4/5 stars
Imperiumi	8.25/10 stars

The Marriage of Heaven and Hell Part I is the sixth studio album by American power metal band Virgin Steele, released in 1995. It is the first part of a trilogy of concept albums, comprising also The Marriage of Heaven and Hell Part II and Invictus, about the relationship between humanity and divinity. The songs of the album do not follow a storyline, but they were inspired by religion, mythology, poetry and the personal beliefs of lyricist David DeFeis.

David De Feis and Ed Pursino played all the bass lines on the album after bass player Rob DeMartino had left the band.

== Track listing ==
All lyrics by David DeFeis, music as listed

No.	Title	Writer(s)	Length
1.	"I Will Come for You"	(DeFeis)	5:47
2.	"Weeping of the Spirits"	(DeFeis, Ed Pursino)	5:42
3.	"Blood and Gasoline"	(DeFeis)	5:31
4.	"Self Crucifixion"	(DeFeis)	4:03
5.	"Last Supper"	(DeFeis)	6:36
6.	"Warrior's Lament" (instrumental)	(DeFeis)	2:17
7.	"Trail of Tears"	(DeFeis, Pursino)	6:54
8.	"The Raven Song"	(DeFeis, Pursino)	5:00
9.	"Forever Will I Roam"	(DeFeis)	5:20
10.	"I Wake Up Screaming"	(DeFeis, Pursino)	4:36
11.	"House of Dust"	(DeFeis)	4:04
12.	"Blood of the Saints"	(DeFeis, Pursino)	4:48
13.	"Life Among the Ruins"	(DeFeis)	6:02
14.	"The Marriage of Heaven and Hell" (instrumental)	(DeFeis)	3:38

== Personnel ==
=== Band members ===
- David DeFeis – vocals, keyboards, producer
- Ed Pursino – guitars, bass
- Joey Ayvazian – drums

=== Production ===
- Steve Young – engineer, mixing
- Axel Thubeauville – executive producer
