= The House of Atreus Act II =

Studio album by Virgin Steele
- Released: October 16, 2000
- Recorded: Media Recording, Merrick, New York
- Genre: Power metal, heavy metal, symphonic metal
- Length: 89:20
- Label: T&T / Noise
- Producer: David DeFeis

Virgin Steele chronology
Magick Fire (2000)	The House of Atreus Act II (2000)	Hymns to Victory (2002)

The House of Atreus Act II, released in 2000, is the tenth studio album by the American heavy metal band Virgin Steele. It was released as a double CD album. This album is the second and final part of a metal opera inspired by the Oresteia, a trilogy of Greek tragedies written by Aeschylus which concerns the end of the curse on the House of Atreus. The music was intended to be the soundtrack for theatrical shows, with actors impersonating the characters of the tragedy. The metal opera was actually performed under the name "Klytaimnestra – The House of Atreus" in European theatres from 1999 to 2001, with the production of the Memmingen Opera House company and Landestheater Production.

In 2019, Metal Hammer ranked it as the 12th best power metal album of all time.

== Track listing ==
All songs by David DeFeis except tracks 3, 8, 10, 23 by DeFeis / Edward Pursino.

=== CD 1 ===
No.	Title	Length
1.	"Wings of Vengeance"	5:12
2.	"Hymn to the Gods of Night"	0:47
3.	"Fire of Ecstasy"	5:16
4.	"The Oracle of Apollo"	1:34
5.	"The Voice as Weapon"	4:41
6.	"Moira"	2:24
7.	"Nemesis"	3:28
8.	"The Wine of Violence"	5:40
9.	"A Token of My Hatred"	8:24
10.	"Summoning the Powers"	7:59

=== CD 2 ===
No.	Title	Length
11.	"Flames of Thy Power (From Blood They Rise)"	5:38
12.	"Arms of Mercury"	4:50

By the Gods Suite
No.	Title	Length
13.	"By the Gods"	4:04
14.	"Areopagos"	0:28
15.	"The Judgement of the Son"	1:56
16.	"Hammer the Winds"	1:32
17.	"Guilt or Innocence"	1:09

The Legends Suite
No.	Title	Length
18.	"The Fields of Asphodel"	1:17
19.	"When the Legends Die"	5:59
20.	"Anemone (Withered Hopes... Forsaken)"	0:56

No.	Title	Length
21.	"The Waters of Acheron"	1:15
22.	"Fantasy and Fugue in D Minor (The Death of Orestes)"	4:22
23.	"Resurrection Day (The Finale)"	10:29

== Personnel ==
=== Band members ===
- David DeFeis – vocals, keyboards, orchestration, effects, producer
- Edward Pursino – guitars, bass
- Frank Gilchriest – drums

=== Production ===
- Steve Young – engineer, mastering
- Ed Warrin – engineer
