= Noble Savage (album) =

Studio album by Virgin Steele
- Released: December 1985
- Recorded: 1985
- Studio: Sonic Sound and Studio 3973, Freeport, New York
- Genre: Heavy metal; power metal
- Length: 46:04
- Label: Cobra
- Producer: David DeFeis

Virgin Steele chronology
Wait for the Night EP (1983)	Noble Savage (1985)	Age of Consent (1988)

2008 edition CD cover

Professional ratings
Review scores
Source	Rating
AllMusic	4/5 stars
The Collector's Guide to Heavy Metal	6/10
Imperiumi	7.5/10 stars
The Metal Crypt	4.5/5 stars

Noble Savage is the third studio album of the American heavy metal band Virgin Steele, released in 1985 by Cobra Records.

== Development ==
Before the recording of Noble Savage, original guitarist Jack Starr resigned from the band and was replaced by Edward Pursino, an old friend of band frontman David DeFeis, whose guitar playing immediately fit very well with Virgin Steele's music and style. Pursino's contribution came also in the form of new musical ideas and compositions, and he is still a mainstay in Virgin Steele's line-up. DeFeis considers this album one of the most important in the history of the band.

Noble Savage was the first album where the band was completely satisfied with its music and sound. It is also the first album on which the current musical style of the band is fully manifested, containing grandiose compositions with multi-layered keyboard sound and more sophisticated arrangements. Noble Savage has become one of the most popular Virgin Steele albums and it includes the songs "We Rule the Night" and "Noble Savage", which the band still plays in concert.

== Reissues ==
Noble Savage was reissued in 1997 on CD by Noise Records with six bonus tracks. The remastered edition of 2008 by Dockyard 1 added two other extra tracks. In May 2011, the album was reissued once more by Steamhammer Records, a subsidiary of SPV, with the same track list as the 1997 release, but with an added bonus CD containing 13 additional tracks.

== Track listing ==
All lyrics are written by David DeFeis

Side one
No.	Title	Music	Length
1.	"We Rule the Night"	DeFeis, Edward Pursino	5:40
2.	"I'm on Fire"	DeFeis, Pursino	3:56
3.	"Thy Kingdom Come"	DeFeis	3:41
4.	"Image of a Faun at Twilight" (instrumental)	DeFeis	1:16
5.	"Noble Savage"	DeFeis	7:30

Side two
No.	Title	Music	Length
6.	"Fight Tooth and Nail"	DeFeis	3:32
7.	"The Evil in Her Eyes"	DeFeis, Pursino	4:44
8.	"Rock Me"	DeFeis, Pursino	3:38
9.	"Don't Close Your Eyes"	DeFeis	5:07
10.	"The Angel of Light"	DeFeis	7:00

1997 Noise Records CD reissue bonus tracks
No.	Title	Music	Length
11.	"Obsession (It Burns for You)"	DeFeis, Pursino	5:37
12.	"Love and Death"	DeFeis, Pursino	4:26
13.	"Where Are You Running To"	DeFeis	4:16
14.	"Come On and Love Me"	DeFeis, Pursino	3:52
15.	"The Spirit of Steele"	DeFeis	2:51
16.	"The Pyre of Kings" (instrumental)	D. DeFeis	1:17
Total length:			68:23

2008 Dockyard 1 remastered edition bonus tracks
No.	Title	Music	Length
11.	"Obsession (It Burns for You)"	DeFeis, Pursino	5:37
12.	"Love and Death"	DeFeis, Pursino	4:26
13.	"Where Are You Running To"	DeFeis	4:16
14.	"Come On and Love Me"	DeFeis, Pursino	3:52
15.	"The Spirit of Steele"	DeFeis	2:51
16.	"The Pyre of Kings" (instrumental)	DeFeis	1:17
17.	"Fight Tooth and Nail (Roman Sword Remix)"	DeFeis	3:34
18.	"Noble Savage (Early Take & Mix)"	DeFeis	6:55
Total length:			78:52

2011 SPV reissue bonus CD tracks
No.	Title	Music	Length
1.	"To the Devil a Daughter"	DeFeis, Pursino	3:26
2.	"God of Violence Kill"	DeFeis	4:36
3.	"Viking"	DeFeis	4:27
4.	"Ase's Death" (instrumental)	Edvard Grieg	1:38
5.	"Bitches from Hell"	DeFeis, Pursino	3:13
6.	"Fight Tooth and Nail (Roman Sword Re-Mix)"	DeFeis	3:34
7.	"Tales from the Hammer"	DeFeis	0:44
8.	"We Rule the Night (Live Pre-Production Rehearsal)"	DeFeis, Pursino	5:10
9.	"I'm on Fire (Live Pre-Production Rehearsal)"	DeFeis	3:24
10.	"Fight Tooth and Nail (Live Pre-Production Rehearsal)"	DeFeis	3:17
11.	"Rock Me (Live Pre-Production Rehearsal)"	DeFeis, Pursino	3:24
12.	"We Rule the Night (Bigger Gongs & Bombs – Early Rough Mix)"	DeFeis, Pursino	5:23
13.	"Noble Savage (Flanging to Eternity – Early Rough Mix)"	DeFeis	6:55
Total length:			49:11

== Personnel ==
=== Band members ===
- David DeFeis – vocals, keyboards, orchestration, producer
- Ed Pursino – guitars
- Joe O'Reilly – bass
- Joey Ayvazian – drums

=== Production ===
- Al Falcon – engineer
- Artie Ware, Jerry Comito – assistant engineers
- Steve Young – remastering engineer
- Hugh Syme – art direction and design
- Dimo Safari – photos
