= The House of Atreus Act I =

Studio album by Virgin Steele
- Released: November 16, 1999
- Studio: Media Recording, The Bellmores, New York
- Genre: Power metal, heavy metal, symphonic metal
- Length: 74:01
- Label: T&T / Noise
- Producer: David DeFeis

Virgin Steele chronology
Invictus (1998)	The House of Atreus Act I (1999)	Magick Fire Music (2000)

Professional ratings
Review scores
Source	Rating
AllMusic	4/5 stars
Collector's Guide to Heavy Metal	8/10

The House of Atreus Act I, released in 1999, is the ninth studio album by the American heavy metal band Virgin Steele. It has the subtitle A Barbaric-Romantic Opera. This album is the first part of a metal opera inspired by the Oresteia, a trilogy of Greek tragedies written by Aeschylus which concerns the end of the curse on the House of Atreus. The music was intended to be the soundtrack for theatrical shows, with actors portraying the characters of the tragedy. The metal opera was actually performed under the name "Klytaimnestra – The House Of Atreus" in European theatres from 1999 to 2001, with the production of the Memmingen Opera House company and Landestheater Production.

== Track listing ==
All songs by David DeFeis except tracks 5, 7, 8, 15 and 18 by DeFeis / Ed Pursino

No.	Title	Length
1.	"Kingdom of the Fearless (The Destruction of Troy)"	7:39
2.	"Blaze of Victory (The Watchman's Song)"	3:59
3.	"Through the Ring of Fire"	5:25
4.	"Prelude in A Minor (The Voyage Home)"	1:14
5.	"Death Darkly Closed Their Eyes (The Messenger's Song)"	1:26
6.	"In Triumph or Tragedy"	1:43
7.	"Return of the King"	4:24
8.	"Flames of the Black Star (The Arrows of Herakles)"	6:31
9.	"Narcissus"	1:13
10.	"And Hecate Smiled"	2:58
11.	"A Song of Prophecy"	2:16
12.	"Child of Desolation"	4:49
13.	"G Minor Invention (Descent into Death's Twilight Kingdom)"	2:58
14.	"Day of Wrath"	1:52
15.	"Great Sword of Flame"	4:29
16.	"The Gift of Tantalos"	1:57
17.	"Iphigenia in Hades"	2:01
18.	"The Fire God"	4:43
19.	"Garden of Lamentation"	1:48
20.	"Agony and Shame"	5:16
21.	"Gate of Kings"	3:45
22.	"Via Sacra"	1:35

== Personnel ==
=== Band members ===
- David DeFeis – vocals, keyboards, orchestration, effects, producer
- Edward Pursino – guitars, bass
- Frank Gilchriest – drums

=== Production ===
- Steve Young, Ed Warrin – engineers
- Michael Sarsfield – mastering
