= Hymns to Victory =

Compilation album by Virgin Steele
- Released: January 7, 2002
- Genre: Power metal, heavy metal
- Length: 78:23
- Label: T&T / Noise / Sanctuary
- Producer: David DeFeis

Virgin Steele chronology
The House of Atreus Act II (2000)	Hymns to Victory (2002)	The Book of Burning (2002)

Professional ratings
Review scores
Source	Rating
AllMusic	1.5/5 stars
laut.de	4/5 stars
metal.de	(favorable)
Metal Temple	7/10

Hymns to Victory is a compilation album by American heavy metal band Virgin Steele. It was released in January 2002 by Noise Records to celebrate the twentieth anniversary of the band, together with the album The Book of Burning.

== Track listing ==
All lyrics by David DeFeis. Music by David DeFeis except tracks 8, 10, 12 by DeFeis / Edward Pursino

1. "Flames of Thy Power (From Blood They Rise)" – 5:38
2. "Through the Ring of Fire" – 5:25
3. "Invictus" – 5:35
4. "Crown of Glory (Unscarred) (In Fury Mix)" – 6:40
5. "Kingdom of the Fearless (The Destruction of Troy)" – 7:39
6. "The Spirit of Steele (Acoustic Version)" – 3:24
7. "A Symphony of Steele (Battle Mix)" – 5:20
8. "The Burning of Rome (Cry for Pompeii)" – 6:38
9. "I Will Come for You" – 5:48
10. "Saturday Night" – 4:09
11. "Noble Savage (Early Mix)" – 7:06
12. "Mists of Avalon" – 5:09
13. "Emalaith" – 9:55

Tracks 1, 2, 3, 5, 8, 9, 13 remastered
Track 4, 7, 11 previously unreleased alternate mix
Track 6 previously unreleased acoustic version
Tracks 10, 12 previously unreleased songs

== Members ==
- David DeFeis – vocals, keyboards and orchestration, swords on 5, 8, bass on 1, 3, 8, all instruments on 6
- Edward Pursino – guitars, bass on 2, 4, 5, 7, 9, 10, 12
- Frank Gilchriest – drums on 1, 2, 3
- Joey Ayvazian – drums on 7, 8, 9, 10, 11
- Joe O'Reilly – bass on 11
- Steve Young – slide guitar solo on 12
