= The Marriage of Heaven and Hell Part II =

Studio album by Virgin Steele
- Released: February 7, 1996
- Recorded: 1995
- Studio: Media Recording, Babylon, New York
- Genre: Power metal, heavy metal
- Length: 66:25
- Label: T&T / Noise
- Producer: David DeFeis, Steve Young, Axel Thubeauville

Virgin Steele chronology
The Marriage of Heaven and Hell Part I (1995)	The Marriage of Heaven and Hell Part II (1996)	Invictus (1998)

Professional ratings
Review scores
Source	Rating
AllMusic	4/5 stars
Imperiumi	9/10 stars

The Marriage of Heaven and Hell Part II is the seventh studio album by American power metal band Virgin Steele and the second of three albums in "The Marriage of Heaven and Hell" series. It was mostly written and composed by David DeFeis and Edward Pursino.

== Track listing ==
All lyrics by David DeFeis, music as listed

No.	Title	Writer(s)	Length
1.	"A Symphony of Steele"	(DeFeis)	5:19
2.	"Crown of Glory"	(DeFeis)	5:53
3.	"From Chaos to Creation" (instrumental)	(DeFeis)	1:44
4.	"Twilight of the Gods"	(DeFeis)	4:00
5.	"Rising Unchained"	(DeFeis, Ed Pursino)	5:40
6.	"Transfiguration"	(DeFeis)	3:53
7.	"Prometheus the Fallen One"	(DeFeis, Pursino)	7:42
8.	"Emalaith"	(DeFeis)	9:53
9.	"Strawgirl"	(DeFeis)	5:27
10.	"Devil/Angel"	(DeFeis, Pursino)	4:08
11.	"Unholy Water"	(DeFeis, Pursino)	5:30
12.	"Victory Is Mine"	(DeFeis, Pursino)	4:19
13.	"The Marriage of Heaven and Hell Revisited" (instrumental)	(DeFeis)	2:14

== Personnel ==
=== Band members ===
- David DeFeis – vocals, keyboards, producer
- Edward Pursino – guitars
- Rob DeMartino – bass
- Joey Ayvazian – drums on tracks 1, 2, 3, 4, 11, 12
- Frank Gilchriest – drums on tracks 5, 6, 7, 8, 9, 10

=== Additional musicians ===
- Frank Zummo – drums on track 13

=== Production ===
- Steve Young – producer, engineer, mixing
- Axel Thubeauville – executive producer
