= Virgin Steele =

American heavy metal band

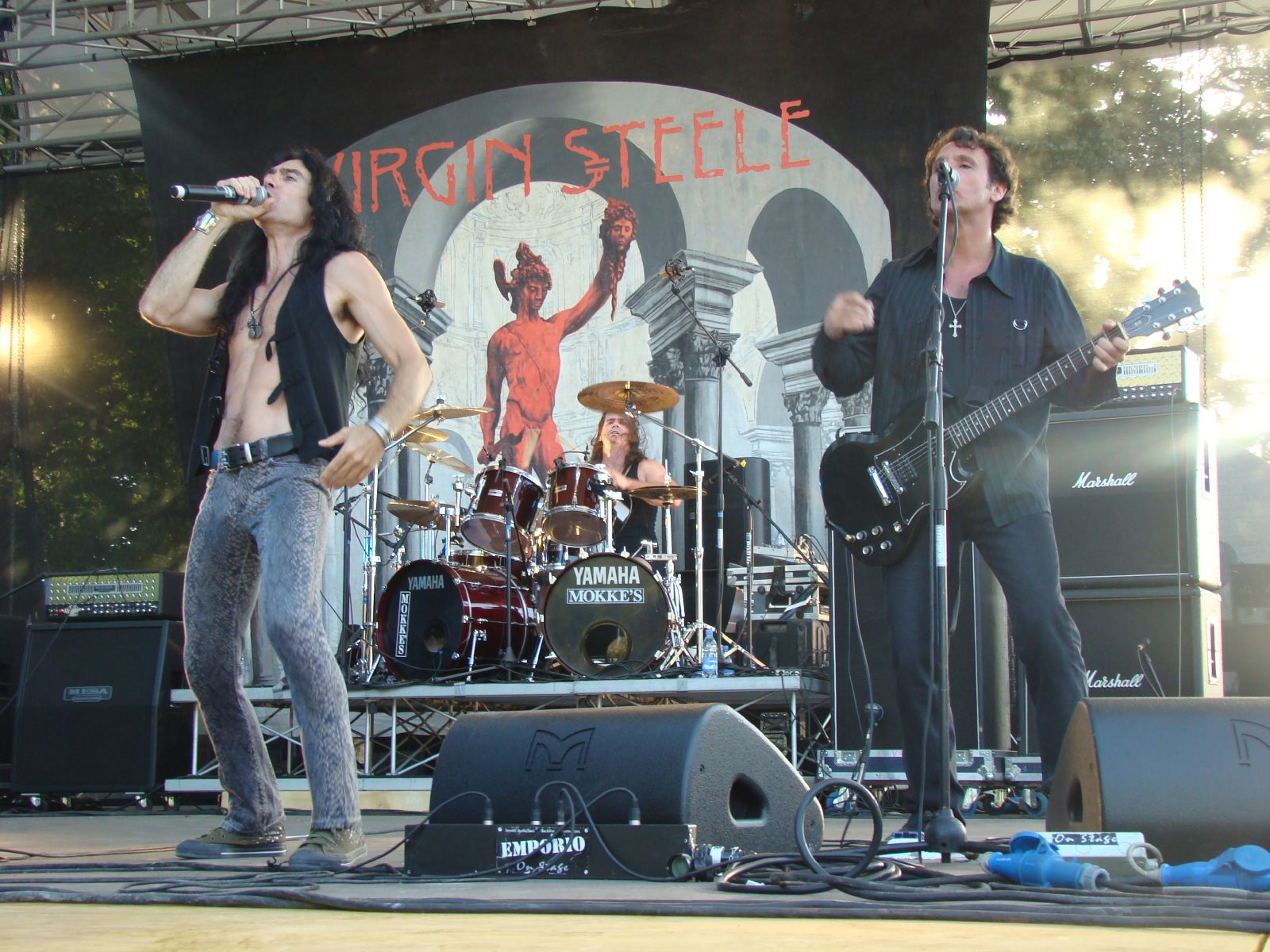
- David DeFeis and Edward Pursino in 2007

Background information
- Origin: Long Island, New York, U.S.
- Genres: Heavy metal; power metal
- Years active: 1981–present
- Labels: SPV/Steamhammer, Dockyard1, T&T/Noise
- Members: David DeFeis; Edward Pursino; Josh Block; Matt McKasty
- Past members: Rob DeMartino; Joey Ayvazian; Joe "O"Reilly; Jack Starr; Frank Gilchriest
- Website: virgin-steele.com

Virgin Steele is an American heavy metal band from New York, originally formed in 1981.

The band released a few career highlights albums (Noble Savage, The Marriage of Heaven and Hell Part I, The Marriage of Heaven and Hell Part II and Invictus). In recent years, they have enriched their sound with elements of musical theatre, progressive and symphonic metal, developing and writing projects such as the metal opera The House of Atreus (based on Oresteia and the Greek myth related to the Atreides) in 1999/2000 and the soundtrack for an imaginary movie Visions of Eden (A Barbaric Romantic Movie of the Mind) or The Lilith Project (based on the Sumerian legend of Lilith) in 2006.

== History ==
=== Origins ===
At the beginning of the 1980s, Jack Starr (a guitarist of French origin) was looking for the right elements to form the ultimate heavy metal band. The first to answer his call was drummer Joey Ayvazian and together they started jamming and auditioning singers. Future L.A. Guns bassist Kelly Nickels joined them in 1981. They auditioned around 40 singers before David DeFeis was introduced to Jack by a friend of Joey.

With an interpretation of "No Quarter" by Led Zeppelin, "Child in Time" by Deep Purple and "Catch the Rainbow" by Rainbow, David got the vacant role of singer, bringing with him bassist Joe O'Reilly. At the end of 1981 the first line-up was ready.

=== The debut album ===
Virgin Steele debuted in 1982 with "Children of the Storm" (a song loved by Metallica), included in the compilation "U.S. Metal Vol. II". Later they issued their self-titled first album. Their style was and remains very original, a melding of American heavy metal and Rainbow's epic atmospheres. DeFeis, who also plays piano and keyboards, shows a particular liking for pompous and melodic arrangements, while Starr goes for a harder and more immediate assault. Fan mail was becoming more interesting. Two letters in particular stand out, one from a young band, who were from Seattle. Their name was Queensrÿche. The other, from California, also a band, who called themselves Metallica.

=== The second album ===
The following year (1983) the second album Guardians of the Flame was supported by a mini LP called Wait for the Night ("A Cry in the Night" in the European version). After the album, Jack Starr started recording his first solo album, Out of the Darkness. Meanwhile, DeFeis continued the band with Edward Pursino. As stated in the Virgin Steele's website "we never actually asked Edward to join the band, he just came down one day and never left".) After a lawsuit won by Starr over the name Virgin Steele, he sold it to DeFeis.

=== Noble Savage and Age of Consent ===
Supported by Pursino, whose style better fit DeFeis' songwriting than Starr's had, Virgin Steele new lineup recorded Noble Savage, which melds classic and epic music. Today, this album is still considered one of the most important manifests of heavy and epic metal worldwide. Between 1985 and 1986, some members of Virgin Steele strongly contributed to an album published under the name Exorcist called Nightmare Theatre and to an album published under the name Piledriver called Stay Ugly. David DeFeis only produced and helped these albums even if some rumors said that he and Pursino were behind these bands.

Finally, the band managed to go to Europe, supporting Manowar on tour and gaining great approval from all quarters because of their live performances. When things started to come together, though, some inexplicable laws seemed to apply and the following album, Age of Consent, got a very narrow distribution and ended up a complete commercial failure. At this point, Virgin Steele were in their darkest period: their label shut down and Joe O'Reilly decided to leave, forcing the band to stop playing for a while.

During this break, David DeFeis graduated in piano and composition and played live with a semi-improvised band called "Smoke Stark Lightning", featuring some famous musicians like his old mate Jack Starr and drummer Bobby Rondinelli.

=== The comeback ===
In 1993, Rob De Martino was chosen as the new bass player and Virgin Steele came back with Life Among the Ruins, an album of Whitesnake-influenced hard rock with a strong bluesy vein. The song "Last rose of Summer" is the highlight of the cd. Featuring none of the trademark epic and mythology-based elements of the band, Life Among the Ruins is probably the most atypical release in the Virgin Steele discography and disliked by many die-hard classic metal fans. Quite interesting is the fact the American version has got a different cover and a bonus-track called "Snakeskin Voodoo Man" (published as a stand-alone single too) while many video-clips, taken from this album, were included into the home-video "Tale Of The Snakeskin Voodoo Man".

=== The Marriage of Heaven and Hell ===
One year later, the band returned to the original sound with The Marriage of Heaven and Hell Part I, an album of epic metal full of melodic and symphonic influences, very progressive oriented. This work (a concept regarding the different side of human nature) includes, among the others, the song "Life Among the Ruins" which is not related to the previous album with the same title.

Virgin Steele went back to Europe supporting Manowar and Uriah Heep and at the beginning of 1996 released The Marriage of Heaven and Hell Part II, following the concept and the style of the first one. The band appeared also on the compilation A Tribute to Judas Priest: Legends of Metal – Volume II playing a raw cover of the song "Screaming for Vengeance". Another Judas Priest cover, "Desert Plains", is included as a bonus track in the Age of Consent album reissue.

After another European tour (this time as headliner) in 1996, a new album was released in March 1998: the third and final chapter of the "Marriage" saga, titled Invictus. This was their heaviest album at the time and also very epic. Lyrically it is a concept album about humanity's rebellion against a pantheon of evil, uncaring gods. The band played at the Wacken Open Air festival in 1997 and in 1998. The Marriage of Heaven and Hell trilogy signs also the debut of drummer Frank Gilchriest. Always in 1998, Virgin Steele headlined a long new European tour with Mark Reale's Riot and Stigmata IV as supporting acts. This tour included the headliner performance at the biker festival "Motorock" in Cremona (Italy).

=== Metal opera ===
Between the years 1999 and 2000, the band released a metal opera, writing the albums The House of Atreus Act I and The House of Atreus Act II, intended to be played by actors in theaters.

The subject of the metal opera was Oresteia and the Greek myths related by Aeschylus, very familiar to David DeFeis, because of his father's theaterical background. On the albums all vocals and orchestrations are managed by David DeFeis himself.

Just before The House of Atreus Act II, the single "Magick Fire Music" was published, with some metal opera outtakes. Inspired by Virgin Steele's metal opera, the German band Tobias Sammet's Avantasia wrote various albums using the same format. David DeFeis appears as special guest on the track: "The Final Sacrifice" included in the Avantasia's second album. After the show at the Bang Your Head!!! festival in 2000 without a bass player, in 2001 Virgin Steele toured with HammerFall and Freedom Call with the new bass player Josh Block.

=== The 20th anniversary ===
In 2002, the band released two compilations to celebrate the 20th anniversary. The Book of Burning consists of a mix of previously unreleased songs and new compositions created by David DeFeis in collaboration with original guitarist Jack Starr. The songs were written at the beginning of the 1990s and previously unofficially appeared in the underground, with Starr at the guitar, with the name "Sacred Demos". The album contained also re-recordings of various songs from the first two albums with Josh Block, and not Jack Starr, supporting Pursino at the second guitar. Hymns to Victory instead is a best-of album covering the band's career from Noble Savage to their latest album The House of Atreus Act II.

The way to manage the reissues of the first two albums Virgin Steele and Guardians of the Flame, never published in cd before, created one more time problems between DeFeis and Starr so they decided to truncate any sort of relationship. DeFeis managed the reissues all by himself remastering the original albums and adding new bonus tracks. The EP A Cry in the Night was included into the Guardians of the Flame CD.

=== Side projects ===
David DeFeis (keyboards and backing vocals) appears as special guest on the first two Immortally Committed albums in the tracks "Epic" and "Council in Hell". He, Edward Pursino, Josh Block and Exorcist's drummer Geoff Fontaine played some live dates with the New York cover band Carnival of Souls. Between the years 2002 and 2005, the band headlined a large number of heavy metal festivals such as the "Agglutination Festival" (2003, Italy), the "Tradate Iron Fest" (2004, Italy), the "Keep It True V Festival" (2004, Germany) and the "Ragnarock Festival" (2005, Netherlands).

=== A Barbaric Romantic Movie of the Mind ===
David DeFeis also created his own recording studio called The Hammer of Zeus (sometimes also called The Wrecking Ball of Thor). In September 2006, after 6 years without an all-new studio album, the band released its 11th full-length Visions of Eden. The album revolves heavily around Gnostic beliefs and critically revisits the traditional Christian mythology with regards to the creation of the Earth and the Biblical accounts of Adam and Eve. An even darker, more melancholic drama than the House of Atreus saga, the story revolves around Lilith, the first wife of Adam and a symbol of female strength and independence. Representing the female side of the true, higher god, she suffers under the lusting, jealous Demiurge who represents the Christian god, and as an emancipated woman who could not get along with the dominant Adam stands in stark contrast to Eve. Adam's second wife is portrayed as a docile, subservient partner created by the demiurge at the request of Adam, who could not cope with an independent woman on equal footing with him.

Visions of Eden (A Barbaric Romantic Movie of the Mind) or The Lilith Project is based on the Sumerian legend of Lilith and it is intended as the soundtrack for an imaginary movie. The band is looking for a producer to bring this concept album story to screen.

=== Recent activities ===
In 2007, the band played at the Power Prog VIII Festival (Atlanta, Georgia) and at the Evolution Festival (Florence, Italy). David DeFeis and Josh Block appear on the Polish band Crystal Viper EP in the cover of Virgin Steele's song "Blood and Gasoline" from The Marriage of Heaven and Hell Part I album. Between 2007 and 2008 the out of print albums Noble Savage, Age of Consent, Life Among the Ruins, The Marriage of Heaven and Hell Part I and The Marriage of Heaven and Hell Part II were reissued (with bonus tracks) by the German label Dockyard1. There are also rumors that a DVD live album is planned, a three hours show recorded at the Downtown Club (Long Island, New York) in 2002 and an acoustic concert played in 2000 in München should be part of it.

A new Virgin Steele album, entitled The Black Light Bacchanalia, was released at the end of October 2010 for the new label SPV/Steamhammer while, in 2011, the whole back-catalogue, from Noble Savage onwards, will be reissued again with faithfully restored covers and booklets, bonus tracks and liner notes.

The first ever Virgin Steele tribute album By the Gods: A Noble Tribute to Virgin Steele was released on October 31, 2015, by Majestic Metal Records. It features a 12-page full-color booklet with exclusive liner notes by Virgin Steele's frontman David DeFeis.

In February 2017, the album Visions of Eden was reissued as a double CD containing a remixed version and a remastered recording of the original mix.

Three years after Nocturnes of Hellfire & Damnation, in 2018 the box-set Seven Devils Moonshine is published containing 3 new albums (Ghost Harvest – Vintage I – Black Wine for Mourning, Ghost Harvest – Vintage II – Red Wine for Warning, Gothic Voodoo Anthems) plus the re-issues of The Book of Burning and Hymns to Victory.

Five years after Seven Devils Moonshine, the band released their first album since then, and their first single-CD album since Nocturnes of Hellfire & Damnation, The Passion of Dionysus, on June 30, 2023.

== Style ==
=== Barbaric romantic music ===
Virgin Steele play what they call symphonic, romantic and bombastic music with many elements taken from classical music and fantasy/mythological lyrics based on real life events. David DeFeis (all vocals, keyboards, orchestration, synth bass, swords and effects) about Virgin Steele's music: "From a whisper to a scream, barbaric, romantic, bombastic, yet subtle, grandiose, yet earthy. A call, a shout, an invocation to Freedom and the continual awakening to the awareness that every moment of life is lived to its fullest potential. It is a force, a sacred quest which drives Virgin Steele on".

Typically, during Virgin Steele's concerts a sword is burnt on stage. In some special show they used to play a long live set called Three hour extravaganza. Fans consider "The Burning of Rome (Cry for Pompeii)" and "Emalaith" some of the most representative songs of the band.

Many Virgin Steele songs are mythological, often dealing with subjects from Greek and Christian mythology. Most of their albums are concept albums. The later albums tend to be more epic and mythological while, on the early albums (up until Life Among the Ruins), many songs are more real-life based stories of love and sex. According to David DeFeis, all the lyrics he writes are based on real life in some form or another.

=== Metal opera and theatre ===
A metal opera is a mix between rock opera, Broadway style and "heavy metal adapted for theater actors' live performances". According to German artists Walter Weyers and Martina Krawulsky, with the name Klytaimnestra – The House of Atreus, metal opera (musically available on the Virgin Steele's albums The House of Atreus Act I, The House of Atreus Act II) was performed on stage in Germany theaters by Landestheater Production. The result, very different from a heavy metal concert, is a metal based dark Broadway style musical really powerful and energetic with actors only. The premiere of Klytaimnestra in Memmingen, June 5, 1999, has been the first ever regular musical theatre show based on heavy metal concepts. After Klytaimnestra's success, David DeFeis & Landestheater Production extracted a second metal opera musical, named "The Rebels", from the previous Marriage of Heaven and Hell trilogy ("The Marriage of Heaven and Hell Part I", "The Marriage of Heaven and Hell Part II", "Invictus").

In 2003, the same team released a third metal opera, named "Lilith", based on the material of album Visions of Eden. "Visions of Eden" was later on published in CD in 2006. In a different way to the previous two operas. Regarding the album, David DeFeis declared: "I don't think of it as a Metal Opera. What it really is, is the soundtrack for a major motion picture that has yet to be made! And by the hammer of Zeus, I will make this film one day. I call this work a Barbaric Romantic movie of the mind.".

== Band members ==
Current members

- David DeFeis – lead vocals, keyboards, synth bass, piano (1981–present)
- Edward Pursino – guitar (1985–present)
- Josh Block – bass (2000–present)
- Matt McKasty – drums (2016–present)

Former members

- Jack Starr – guitar (1981–1984)
- Joe O'Reilly – bass (1981–1992)
- Joey Ayvazian – drums (1981–1995)
- Rob DeMartino – bass (1993–1999)
- Frank Gilchriest – drums (1995–2015)

== Discography ==
=== Albums ===
- 1982: Virgin Steele
- 1983: Guardians of the Flame
- 1985: Noble Savage
- 1988: Age of Consent
- 1993: Life Among the Ruins
- 1995: The Marriage of Heaven and Hell Part I
- 1996: The Marriage of Heaven and Hell Part II
- 1998: Invictus
- 1999: The House of Atreus Act I
- 2000: The House of Atreus Act II
- 2006: Visions of Eden
- 2010: The Black Light Bacchanalia
- 2015: Nocturnes of Hellfire & Damnation
- 2018: Seven Devils Moonshine (includes their 2002 compilations)
  - Ghost Harvest – Vintage I – Black Wine for Mourning
  - Ghost Harvest – Vintage II – Red Wine for Warning
  - Gothic Voodoo Anthems
- 2023: The Passion of Dionysus

=== EPs ===
- 1983: Wait for the Night
- 2000: Magick Fire Music

=== Compilations ===
- 2002: Hymns to Victory (*)
- 2002: The Book of Burning (*)

(*) re-issues included in 2018 box set Seven Devils Moonshine

=== Singles ===
- 1992: "Snakeskin Voodoo Man"
- 1998: "Through Blood and Fire"

=== Videos/DVD ===
- 1992: Tale of the Snakeskin Voodoo Man

=== Tributes ===
- 2015: By the Gods: A Noble Tribute to Virgin Steele
