= Jack Starr =

American guitarist (born 1950)

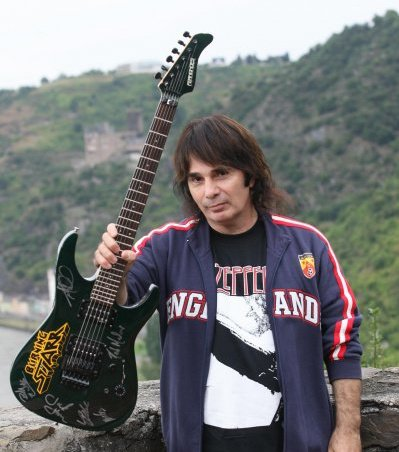

Background information
- Born: 22 August 1950 (age 76); Paris, France
- Genres: Rock, hard rock, heavy metal, blues
- Occupations: Musician, songwriter, record producer
- Instrument: Guitar
- Years active: Late 1960s–present
- Member of: Jack Starr's Burning Starr, Jack Starr Blues Band
- Formerly of: Virgin Steele, Devil Childe, Phantom Lord, Thrasher, Strider, Smokestack Lightning, Guardians of the Flame

Jack Starr (born August 22, 1950) is an American heavy metal and blues guitarist.

== Biography ==
Starr was born to a French mother and American father. He learned to play guitar by ear, copying the riffs of R&B records. His first semi-professional band was California, which featured members of Les Variations, and was based in France. Starr also wrote a song for Les Variations called "Silver Girl," for which he agreed to be paid a flat fee. In the U.S. Starr emerged on the rock and metal scene in 1981, forming, together with Joey Ayvazian, David DeFeis and Joe O'Rielly, the first incarnation of the heavy metal band Virgin Steele. The new band was selected in 1982 by Mike Varney of Shrapnel Records to appear on the label's compilation album U.S. Metal Volume 2. The song Starr sent in for the compilation was "Children of the Storm". After only two albums, Virgin Steele of 1981 and Guardians of the Flame of 1982, Starr left Virgin Steele in 1983 because of musical differences with the band's front man and other main songwriter David DeFeis.

In 1984, Starr started his solo recording career with the album Out of the Darkness, featuring former Riot vocalist Rhett Forrester, members of The Rods, and former Rainbow drummer Gary Driscoll. It was released in Europe by Music for Nations and was picked as one of the best albums of the year by the music magazines Kerrang! and Metal Forces.

Starr changed the name of his band to Jack Starr's Burning Starr and between 1984 and 1989 he produced albums, both solo and with the band. The music of those albums was classic American eighties heavy metal, a style between Poison and Metallica. In 1989, the band dissolved and Starr joined short-lived bands like Strider and Smoke Stack Lightning.

After a break, in 2003, Starr founded a new band called Guardians of the Flame, which released only one album, Under a Savage Sky.

In 2006, Starr founded the Jack Starr Blues Band.

In the following years, Starr once again assembled a group of musicians for a new incarnation of Burning Starr, which performed at the Magic Circle Festival 2008 and released the album Defiance on the Manowar's label Magic Circle Music in 2009. In 2011, they released Land of the Dead with Limb Music. The albums includes ex-Manowar guest musicians Ross the Boss and David Shankle. The band played at the 2013 Keep It True festival and recorded a DVD.

== Discography ==
=== Solo albums ===
- Out of the Darkness (1984)
- A Minor Disturbance (1990)
- Soon Day Will Come (2000)
- Before the Steele: Roots of a Metal Master (2001) (compilation)
- Swimming in Dirty Water (2011)
- Out of the Darkness Part 2 (2025)

=== Virgin Steele ===
- Demo (1982)
- Virgin Steele (1982)
- Guardians of the Flame (1983)
- Wait for the Night EP (1983)

=== Devil Childe ===
- Devil Childe (1984)

=== Burning Starr ===
- Rock the American Way (1985)
- No Turning Back (1986)
- Blaze of Glory (1987)
- Jack Starr's Burning Starr (1989)
- Burning Starr (compilation) (1998)
- Defiance (2009)
- Land of the Dead (2011)
- Stand Your Ground (2017)
- Souls of the Innocent (2022)

=== Phantom Lord ===
- Phantom Lord (1985)
- PHANTOM LORD -"Evil Never Sleeps "(1986)

=== Thrasher ===
- Burning at the Speed of Light (1985)

=== Strider ===
- Strider (1991)

=== Guardians of the Flame ===
- Under a Savage Sky (2003)

=== Jack Starr Blues Band ===
- Take It to the Bank (2008)
