= The Bellmores, New York =

"The Bellmores, New York", is a collective term referring to Bellmore and North Bellmore:

- Bellmore, New York, census-designated place (CDP) in Nassau County, New York, United States
- North Bellmore, New York, census-designated place (CDP) in Nassau County, New York, United States
