= David DeFeis =

American heavy metal singer

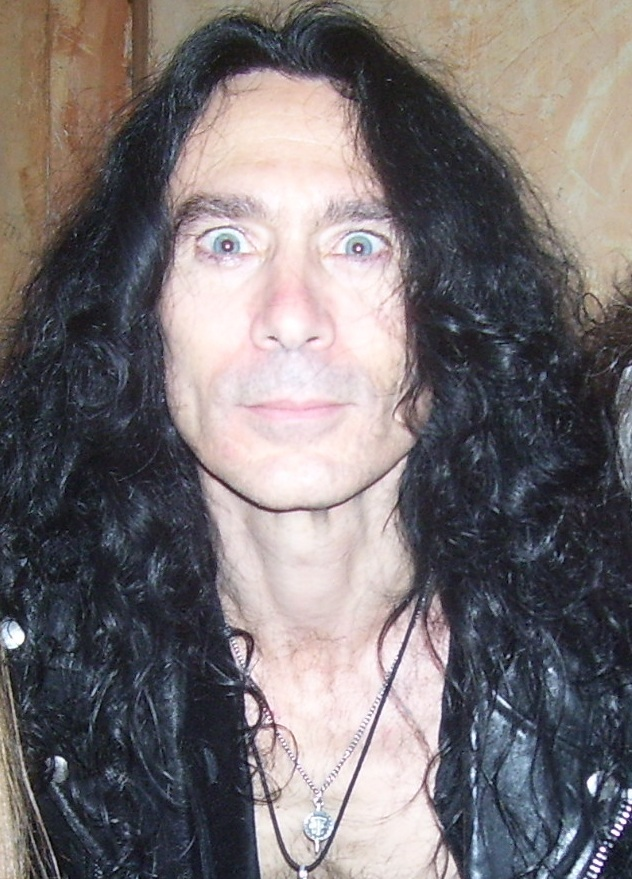
- DeFeis in 2010

Background information
- Born: January 4, 1961 (age 65)
- Origin: Long Island, New York, U.S.
- Genres: Heavy metal, power metal
- Occupations: Singer, musician, songwriter, record producer
- Instruments: Vocals, keyboards
- Years active: 1981–present
- Member of: Virgin Steele
- Website: virgin-steele.com

David DeFeis (born January 4, 1961) is an American singer, songwriter and producer. He is the main composer, leader and sole constant member of the heavy metal band Virgin Steele.

== Biography ==
DeFeis comes from a theatrical family: his father was a Shakespearian actor who run the theatre company "The Arena Players Theatre" while his sister Doreen is a gifted opera singer who performs all over Europe.

A big fan of European classical music, at 9–10 years old he was introduced to rock music by hearing the band Stalk, with his brother Damon (on organ and piano) and his sister Danae (on vocals), playing in the basement beneath his room. Damon DeFeis was later in the band Creation with future Kiss drummer Eric Carr. Damon died while playing a Creation show in the Gulliver's nightclub fire in 1974.

He began piano lessons at the age of eight. By age eleven, he began his career with Long Island's local heavy metal band Phoenix.

At 16 years old, he met for the first time his future partner Edward Pursino when DeFeis's band at the time, Mountain Ash, was auditioning for a gig at the high school dance. Mountain Ash was mainly a Black Sabbath cover band and, after the performance of the song "War Pigs", Pursino came over and introduced himself to DeFeis.

At the beginning of the 1980s, together with Jack Starr and Joey Ayvazian, he started the first line-up of the band Virgin Steele. They debuted in 1982 with the song "Children of the Storm" included in the compilation U.S. Metal Vol. II.

In 1985, the guitarist Edward Pursino replaced Starr. Among the years, in their longtime relationship in Virgin Steele, DeFeis and Pursino released a lot of heavy metal classics such as the albums: Noble Savage, Invictus, The Marriage of Heaven and Hell Part I, The Marriage of Heaven and Hell Part II.

DeFeis collects swords: his collection includes more than 20 items. In studio, sometimes he uses his swords to create particular effects for the Virgin Steele songs, and during the concerts he usually burns a sword on stage.

== Voice and musical style ==
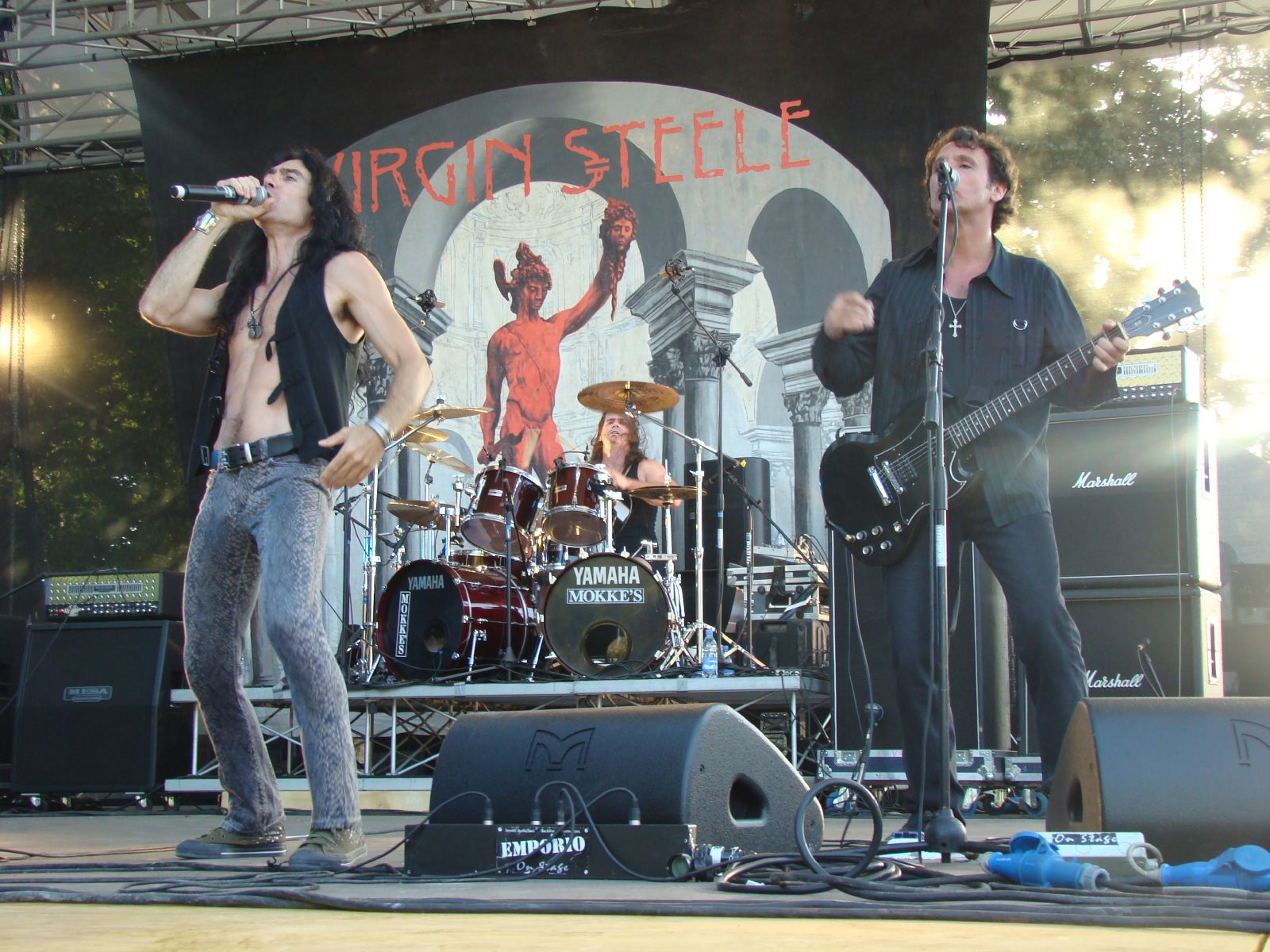
DeFeis (left) performing in 2007

DeFeis is a classically trained pianist, with a bachelor's degree in composition from S.U.N.Y. Stony Brook. As vocalist, he is self-taught, possessing around four octaves and a four notes: E2-B6. He said he was very much influenced by guitar players like Jimmy Page, Brian May and Eddie Van Halen, because he wanted to do with his voice what they did with their guitars. He is also influenced by rock singers like Freddie Mercury, Robert Plant, David Coverdale, Ronnie James Dio and Ian Gillan.

The major part of the lyrics DeFeis writes are mythological, dealing with subjects from especially Greek, Sumerian and Christian mythology. All of them are based on real life in some form or another.

== Metal opera and theatre ==
Between the end of the 1990s and the 2000s (decade), he wrote music for actors based on the Oresteia and the Greek myths related by Aeschylus. According with German artists Walter Weyers and Martina Krawulsky, with the name "Klytaimnestra": "The House of Atreus" Metal Opera (musically available on the Virgin Steele's albums The House of Atreus Act I, The House of Atreus Act II) was performed on stage in Germany theaters by Landestheater Production.

The premiere of "Klytaimnestra" in Memmingen, June 5, 1999, has been the first ever regular musical theatre show based on heavy metal concepts.

After "Klytaimnestra" success, David DeFeis & Landestheater Production extracted a second metal opera musical, named "The Rebels", from the previous Virgin Steele's albums of the Marriage of Heaven and Hell trilogy ("The Marriage of Heaven and Hell Part I", "The Marriage of Heaven and Hell Part II", "Invictus").

In 2003, the same team released a third Metal Opera, named "Lilith", based on the material of album Visions of Eden. "Visions of Eden" was later on published in CD in 2006.

== Producer ==
DeFeis owns his personal recording studio called: "The Hammer of Zeus" (sometimes also called "The Wrecking Ball Of Thor").

Virgin Steele's albums are produced by DeFeis.

He also produced albums released by other artists such as: Out of the Darkness and No Turning Back by Jack Starr, Nightmare Theatre by Exorcist, Stay Ugly by Piledriver, The Sign of the Jackal by Damien Thorn, Sin Will Find You Out by Original Sin.

== Side projects ==
- 1986 – Produced and wrote the debut album Sin Will Find You Out of the female band Original Sin.
- 1990 – Played in a side-project blues band called Smokestack Lightning with Jack Starr and the future Virgin Steele's bass player Rob De Martino.
- 1993 – Published, with Virgin Steele, the blues single "Snakeskin Voodoo Man" inspired to Muddy Waters.
- 1999 – Played the backup vocals & the keyboard-parts on the song "Epic" included into the first album of the New York band Immortally Committed.
- 2001 – Appeared as special guest, singing on the track "The Final Sacrifice" included into the German supergroup Tobias Sammet's Avantasia's first single.
- 2002 – Joined the New York cover band Carnival of Souls for some live dates with the Exorcist's drummer Geoff Fontaine, Edward Pursino and the current Virgin Steele's bass player Josh Block.
- 2007 – Appeared on the Polish band Crystal Viper EP in the cover of Virgin Steele's song "Blood and Gasoline".
- 2010 – Scheduled to appear on the next album of the Italian band Skylark, singing the song "Symbol of Freedom" together with Kiara Laetitia, their female singer.
- 2013 – Co-wrote and co-produced the solo project of Kiara Laetitia, out on November 22. The EP also contains a cover of Victory Is Mine.
- 2014 - Contributed with vocals on "Reise of the 4th Reich", track from Avalon's Angels of the Apocalypse

== Discography ==
- 1982 – Virgin Steele
- 1983 – Guardians of the Flame
- 1983 – Wait for the Night [EP]
- 1986 – Noble Savage
- 1988 – Age of Consent
- 1993 – Snakeskin Voodoo Man [Single]
- 1993 – Life Among the Ruins
- 1994 – The Marriage of Heaven and Hell Part I
- 1995 – The Marriage of Heaven and Hell Part II
- 1998 – Invictus
- 1998 – The House of Atreus Act I
- 2000 – The House of Atreus Act II
- 2000 – Magick Fire Music [EP]
- 2002 – The Book of Burning [Compilation/Best of/Re-recorded early material]
- 2002 – Hymns to Victory [Compilation/Best of]
- 2006 – Visions of Eden
- 2010 – The Black Light Bacchanalia
- 2015 – Nocturnes of Hellfire & Damnation

== Videography ==
- 1992 – Virgin Steele: Tale of the Snakeskin Voodoo Man [VHS]
