= List of Krokus band members =

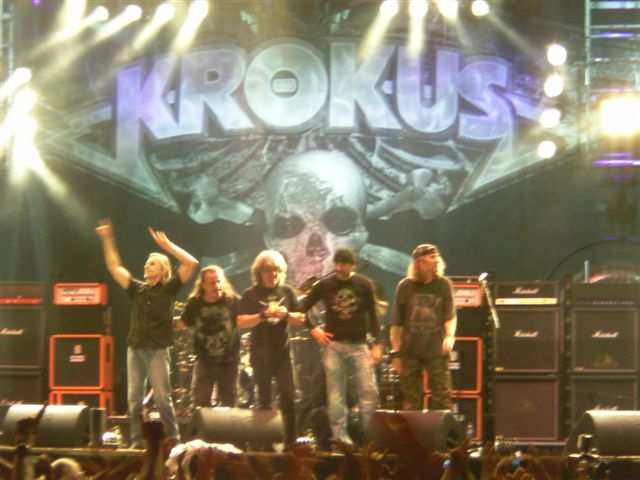
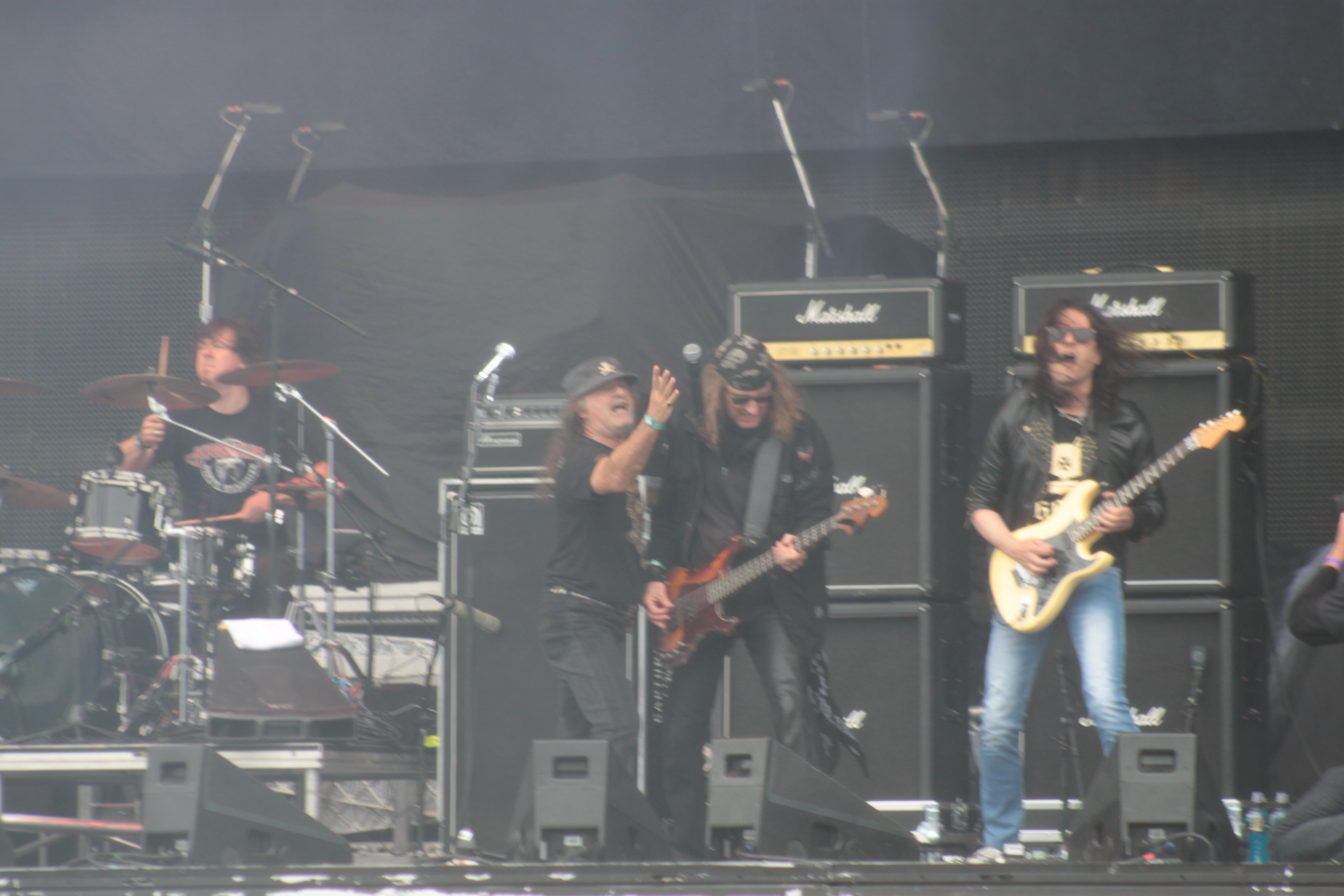
Krokus in 2008 (top) and 2013 (bottom)

Krokus are a Swiss hard rock band from Solothurn. Formed in 1975, the group originally consisted of lead vocalist Peter Richard, guitarist Tommy Kiefer, bassist Remo Spadino and drummer, percussionist and keyboardist Chris von Rohr. By the time of the release of their self-titled debut album, Kiefer had taken over lead vocal duties, and Hansi Droz was the rhythm guitarist. The band's current lineup features von Rohr on bass/keyboards/percussion/backing vocals (1975–1983, 1987–1989, and since 2008), lead vocalist Marc Storace (1979–1988, 1994–1999, and since 2002), lead guitarists Fernando von Arb (1976–1989, 1994–1995, since 2008) and Mandy Meyer (1981, 2004–2008, 2012—2014, and since 2015), rhythm guitarist Mark "Koki" Kohler (1982–1989, 1994–1995, 2008–2014, and since 2015) and drummer Flavio Mezzodi (since 2013).

== History ==
=== 1975–1983 ===
Krokus were formed in 1975, by guitarist Tommy Kiefer and drummer, percussionist and keyboardist Chris von Rohr. The original lineup also included vocalist Peter Richard and bassist Remo Spadino.

Richard left shortly after the band's first live show in September 1975, at which point Kiefer took over primary lead vocal duties and Hansi Droz was brought in as a second guitarist. After the release of the group's self-titled debut album, Daniel DeBritt briefly took over on lead vocals, but had left before the end of the year.

Kiefer and von Rohr subsequently dismissed Droz and Spadino, and rebuilt the band by adding all three members of local trio Montezuma – Fernando von Arb on guitar, Jürg Naegeli on bass and keyboards and Freddy "Steady" Frutig on drums, with von Rohr taking over lead vocals and percussion. To You All and Pain Killer followed in 1977 and 1978.

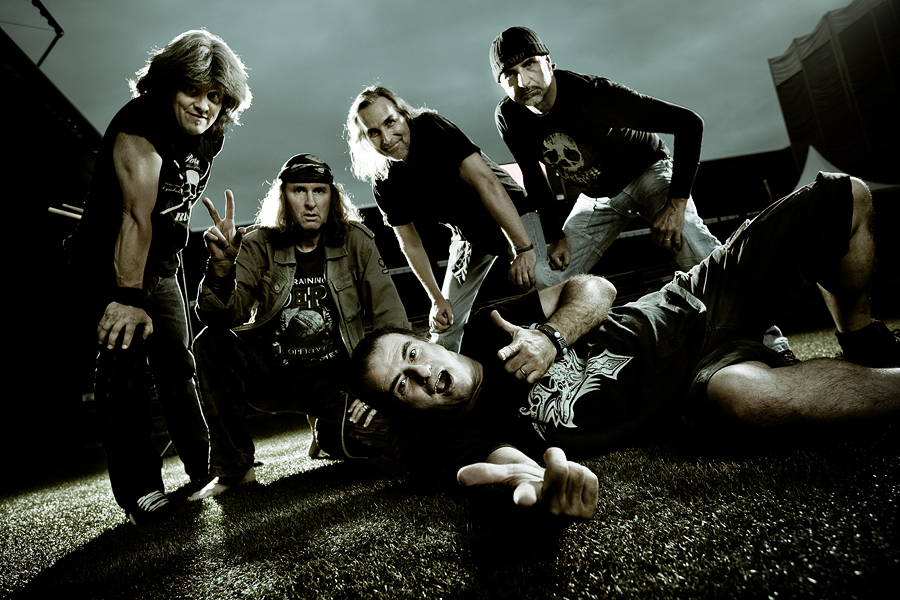
Marc Storace joined on lead vocals in 1979, remaining through most of the 1980s. He rejoined for a five-year stint in the 1990s, and again in 2002.

For the tour in promotion of Pain Killer on December, Paul Bierk was brought in to take over on lead vocals, von Rohr switching to bass. Two months later Bierk was replaced by Heiner "Henry" Freis. Freis, it's turn, was replaced by Marc Storace. Naegeli also returned, but already on live mixing and also playing keyboards. This group includes debuted on the 1980 release Metal Rendez-vous. During the album's promotional tour, Kiefer was temporarily replaced by Mandy Meyer in April 1981. Shortly after the release of Hardware early the next year, the guitarist left permanently due to an ongoing heroin addiction, and Meyer remained as his replacement. By the beginning of 1982, however, Meyer had been left Switzerland to relocate to the United States and form Cobra, and was replaced in Krokus by Mark "Koki" Kohler. On 24 December 1986, Kiefer committed suicide by hanging after contracting AIDS around a year earlier.

After the release and promotion of 1982's One Vice at a Time, Freddy Steady left Krokus and was replaced by American drummer Steve Pace, the first non-European member of the group; when asked the following year about the lineup change, Storace claimed that it was made due to "musical direction and technical ability". Headhunter was released in 1983, and during the subsequent tour von Rohr became the last founding member to leave the band, when he was dismissed after giving "a tell-tale interview" to a Swiss newspaper regarding the band's drug-heavy touring lifestyle. With scheduled shows remaining on the tour, Kohler switched to bass and Patrick Mahassen briefly joined on rhythm guitar. At the end of the year, following the conclusion of the touring cycle, Mahassen was fired and Pace also left.

=== 1984–2005 ===
In preparation for the recording of The Blitz in 1984, Steve Pace was replaced by former Cobra drummer Jeff Klaven. Patrick Mahassen briefly returned during early sessions, but was fired again shortly thereafter and did not feature on the record. Upon the album's release, Andy Tanas took over on bass, allowing Mark Kohler to return to his original role of rhythm guitarist. Towards the end of The Blitz touring cycle, Tanas left due to "direction differences". Tommy Keiser, another former member of Cobra, took his place. The new lineup issued Change of Address in 1986, the tour for which spawned a live album, Alive and Screamin'.

In early 1987, Krokus parted ways with Keiser and Klaven, with frontman Mark Storace claiming that the former "just wouldn't work hard enough and lacked the musical depth we were looking for", and that the latter had become "fed up with touring". They were replaced by the returning Chris von Rohr and former Killer drummer Dani Crivelli, respectively. Heart Attack was released the next year, however after the subsequent promotional tour it was announced in August 1988 that Storace had been dismissed from the group. Lead guitarist Fernando von Arb departed around the same time. Storace and von Arb were replaced by Björn Lodin of Baltimoore and Crivelli's former Killer bandmate Many Maurer, respectively, although by early the next year the group had disbanded entirely.

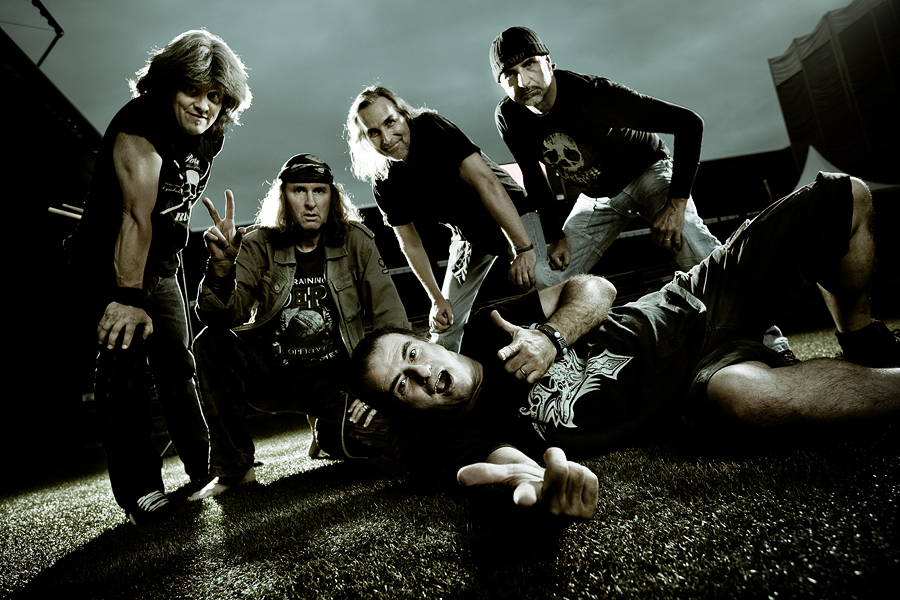
Following the band's breakup in 1989, Fernando von Arb rebuilt Krokus and led the group during the 1990s.

In early 1990, Fernando von Arb (on bass) formed a new lineup of Krokus with Maurer, lead vocalist Peter Tanner, rhythm guitarist Tony Castell and drummer Peter "Rabbit" Haas. The band issued Stampede and toured until 1991, before going on hiatus again when von Arb was diagnosed with lymphoma. In early 1994, von Arb (back on guitar) reformed Krokus yet again, retaining Maurer on bass and reuniting with vocalist Marc Storace, rhythm guitarist Mark Kohler and drummer Freddy Steady. The new lineup released To Rock or Not to Be and toured during 1995, before disbanding again due to various members' family commitments making it difficult to commit full-time.

In spring 1999, Fernando von Arb reformed Krokus for a third time, retaining Many Maurer on bass and adding lead vocalist Carl Sentance, rhythm guitarist Chris Lauper and former drummer Peter Haas. After the release of Round 13, Haas was replaced by Cliff Rodgers. After the first leg of the tour, Lauper, Maurer and Rodgers were replaced by Dave Stettler, Tony Castell and Marcel Kopp, respectively. The group continued touring until it was announced in April 2002 that former vocalist Marc Storace would be returning to the lineup. With his return, the frontman brought solo band members Dominique Favez on rhythm guitar and Patrick Aeby on drums to Krokus.

=== Since 2005 ===
Following the release of Rock the Block and Fire and Gasoline Live, von Arb left Krokus in February 2005 for the first time since joining in 1976. The departure occurred after the guitarist developed tendonitis in his wrist, although Storace claimed at the time that he "basically did not want to tour". von Arb was replaced by former guitarist Mandy Meyer. In November, Aeby also left the band. He was replaced in January 2006 by Stefan Schwarzmann, formerly of U.D.O., Accept and Helloween. The new lineup released Hellraiser in 2006 and toured until February 2008, when it was announced that the band would be taking "an artistic break".

In April 2008, it was announced that guitarist Fernando von Arb, bassist, keyboardist and percussionist Chris von Rohr and drummer Freddy Steady had all returned to Krokus. Rhythm guitarist Mark Kohler followed in May, marking a reunion of the One Vice at a Time (1982) lineup. The band released Hoodoo in 2010, before Steady left in May 2011. He was replaced by Unisonic and Pink Cream 69 drummer Kosta Zafiriou, who was credited as a backup musician rather than an official member. In December 2012, the group expanded to a three-guitarist lineup for the first time when Mandy Meyer returned again. Dirty Dynamite was released in March 2013. Helloween drummer Dani Löble took over for a few shows in May 2013, before Flavio Mezzodi joined as a full-time member the same month.

During 2014 and 2015, Dominique Favez toured with Krokus in place of von Arb and Kohler, who were unable to tour. The band issued Big Rocks, a collection of cover versions, in January 2017.

== Members ==
=== Current ===
Image	Name	Years active	Instruments	Release contributions
	Chris von Rohr	1975–1983; 1987–1989; 2008–present	bass (since 1978); keyboards; percussion; drums (1975–1976); lead vocals (1975, 1976–1978); backing vocals (except 1976–1978)	all Krokus releases from Krokus (1976) to Headhunter (1983), and from Hoodoo (2010) onwards; Heart Attack (1988)
	Fernando von Arb	1976–1988; 1990–1991; 1994–1995; 1999–2005; 2008–present	lead and rhythm guitars; bass; keyboards; backing vocals	all Krokus releases from To You All (1977) onwards, except Hellraiser (2006)
	Marc "The Voice" Storace	1979–1988; 1994–1995; 2002–present	lead vocals	all Krokus releases from Metal Rendez-vous (1980) to Heart Attack (1988), and from Rock the Block (2003) onwards; "You Ain't Seen Nothin' Yet" (1994); To Rock or Not to Be (1995)
	Armand "Mandy" Meyer	1981; 2005–2008; 2012–present	lead and rhythm guitars	Hellraiser (2006); Dirty Dynamite (2013); Long Stick Goes Boom: Live from da House of Rust (2014); Big Rocks (2017)
	Mark "Koki" Kohler	1982–1989; 1994–1995; 2008–present	rhythm guitar; bass	all Krokus releases from One Vice at a Time (1982) to Heart Attack (1988), and from Hoodoo (2010) onwards; "You Ain't Seen Nothin' Yet" (1994); To Rock or Not to Be (1995)
	Flavio Mezzodi	2013–present	drums; percussion	Long Stick Goes Boom: Live from da House of Rust (2014); Big Rocks (2017)

=== Former ===
Image	Name	Years active	Instruments	Release contributions
	Tommy Kiefer	1975–1981 (died 1986)	lead guitar; rhythm guitar (1975); backing vocals; lead vocals (1975–1976)	all Krokus releases from Krokus (1976) to Hardware (1981)
	Remo Spadino	1975–1976 (died 2010)	bass	Krokus (1976); To You All (1977) — (four tracks only)
	Peter Richard	1975	lead vocals	Krokus (1976) — (backing vocals only); To You All (1977) — (three tracks only)
	Hansi Droz	1975–1976 (died 1999)	rhythm guitar	Krokus (1976)
	Daniel DeBritt	1976	lead vocals	none
	Freddy "Steady" Frutig	1976–1982; 1994–1995; 2008–2011	drums; percussion; backing vocals (1976–1982)	all Krokus releases from To You All (1977) to One Vice at a Time (1982); "You Ain't Seen Nothin' Yet" (1994); To Rock or Not to Be (1995); Hoodoo (2010)
	Jürg Naegeli	1976–1978; 1979–1981; 1990–1991; 1994–1995	keyboards; bass; backing vocals	To You All (1977); Pain Killer (1978); Metal Rendez-vous (1980); Hardware (1981); Stampede (1990); "You Ain't Seen Nothin' Yet" (1994); To Rock or Not to Be (1995)
	Paul Bierk	1978–1979	lead vocals	none
	Heiner "Henry" Freis	1979	lead vocals	none
	Steve Pace	1982–1984	drums; percussion	Headhunter (1983)
	Jeff Klaven	1984–1987	drums; percussion	The Blitz (1984); Change of Address (1986); Alive and Screamin' (1986)
	Patrick Mahassen	1984	rhythm guitar	none
	Doug Johnson	1984	keyboards	The Blitz (1984)
	Andy Tanas	1984–1985	bass	none
	Tommy Keiser	1985–1987	bass	Change of Address (1986); Alive and Screamin' (1986)
	Jai Winding	1985–1987	keyboards	Change of Address (1986); Alive and Screamin' (1986)
	Dani Crivelli	1987–1989 (died 2013)	drums; percussion	Heart Attack (1988)
	Many Maurer	1988–1989; 1990–1991; 1994–1995; 1999–2000	lead guitar; bass	Stampede (1990); "You Ain't Seen Nothin' Yet" (1994); To Rock or Not to Be (1995); Round 13 (1999)
	Björn Lodin	1988–1989	lead vocals	none
	Peter "Rabbit" Haas	1990–1991; 1999	drums; percussion	Stampede (1990); Round 13 (1999)
	Tony "T.C." Castell	1990–1991; 2000–2008	bass; rhythm guitar; backing vocals	Stampede (1990); To Rock or Not to Be (1995); Rock the Block (2003); Fire and Gasoline Live (2004); Hellraiser (2006)
	Peter Tanner	1990–1991	lead vocals	Stampede (1990)
	Carl Sentance	1999–2002	lead vocals	Round 13 (1999)
	Chris Lauper	1999–2000	rhythm guitar	Round 13 (1999)
	Cliff Rodgers	1999–2000	drums	none
	Marcel Kopp	2000–2002	drums	none
	Dave Stettler	2000–2002	rhythm guitar	none
	Dominique Favez	2002–2008; 2014–2015	rhythm guitar	Rock the Block (2003); Fire and Gasoline Live (2004); Hellraiser (2006)
	Patrick Aeby	2002–2005	drums; percussion	Rock the Block (2003); Fire and Gasoline Live (2004)
	Dennis Ward	2006–2008 (backup member)	keyboards	Hellraiser (2006)
	Stefan Schwarzmann	2006–2008	drums; percussion	Hellraiser (2006)
	Kosta Zafiriou	2011–2013 (initially touring)	drums; percussion	Dirty Dynamite (2013)
	Daniel "Dani" Löble	2013 (backup member)	drums; percussion	none

== Lineups ==
Period	Members	Releases
1975	Peter Richard – lead vocals; Tommy Kiefer – guitar, backing vocals; Remo Spadino – bass; Chris von Rohr – drums, percussion, piano, backing vocals	none
September 1975 – March 1976	Tommy Kiefer – lead guitar, lead and backing vocals; Hansi Droz – rhythm guitar; Remo Spadino – bass; Chris von Rohr – drums, percussion, backing and lead vocals, piano	Krokus (1976)
April – October 1976	Daniel DeBritt – lead vocals; Tommy Kiefer – lead guitar, backing vocals; Hansi Droz – rhythm guitar; Remo Spadino – bass; Chris von Rohr – drums, percussion, keyboards, piano, backing vocals	none
November 1976 – November 1978	Chris von Rohr – lead vocals, percussion, drums, bass, keyboards; Tommy Kiefer – lead guitar, backing vocals; Fernando von Arb – rhythm guitar, backing vocals, bass, keyboards; Jürg Naegeli – bass, keyboards, backing vocals; Freddy Steady – drums, percussion, backing vocals	To You All (1977); Pain Killer (1978)
December 1978 – January 1979	Paul Bierk – lead vocals; Tommy Kiefer – lead guitar, backing vocals; Fernando von Arb – rhythm guitar, backing vocals; Chris von Rohr – bass, keyboards, percussion, backing vocals; Freddy Steady – drums, percussion, backing vocals	none
February – October 1979	Henry Friez – lead vocals; Tommy Kiefer – lead guitar, backing vocals; Fernando von Arb – rhythm guitar, backing vocals; Chris von Rohr – bass, keyboards, percussion, backing vocals; Freddy Steady – drums, percussion, backing vocals	none
October 1979 – April 1981	Marc Storace – lead vocals; Tommy Kiefer – lead guitar, backing vocals; Fernando von Arb – rhythm guitar, keyboards, bass, backing vocals; Jürg Naegeli – keyboards, bass, backing vocals; Chris von Rohr – bass, percussion, keyboards, backing vocals; Freddy Steady – drums, percussion, backing vocals	Metal Rendez-vous (1980); Hardware (1981)
April – October 1981	Marc Storace – lead vocals; Mandy Meyer – lead guitar; Fernando von Arb – rhythm guitar, keyboards, backing vocals; Chris von Rohr – bass, keyboards, percussion, backing vocals; Freddy Steady – drums, percussion, backing vocals	none
October 1981 – August 1982	Marc Storace – lead vocals; Fernando von Arb – lead guitar; Mark Kohler – rhythm guitar; Chris von Rohr – bass, keyboards, percussion; Freddy Steady – drums	One Vice at a Time (1982)
August 1982 – December 1983	Marc Storace – lead vocals; Fernando von Arb – lead guitar, bass, piano; Mark Kohler – rhythm guitar, bass; Chris von Rohr – bass, piano, percussion; Steve Pace – drums, percussion	Headhunter (1983)
Early 1984	Marc Storace – lead vocals; Fernando von Arb – lead guitar, keyboards, backing vocals; Patrick Mahassen – rhythm guitar; Mark Kohler – bass; Steve Pace – drums	none
1984	Marc Storace – lead vocals; Fernando von Arb – lead and rhythm guitar; Mark Kohler – bass; Jeff Klaven – drums, percussion; Doug Johnson – keyboards (session)	The Blitz (1984)
1984 – April 1985	Marc Storace – lead vocals; Fernando von Arb – lead guitar, keyboards, backing vocals; Mark Kohler – rhythm guitar; Andy Tanas – bass; Jeff Klaven – drums, percussion	none
April 1985 – February 1987	Marc Storace – lead vocals; Fernando von Arb – lead guitar; Mark Kohler – rhythm guitar; Tommy Keiser – bass; Jeff Klaven – drums, percussion; Jai Winding – keyboards (backup)	Change of Address (1986); Alive and Screamin' (1986)
February 1987 – September 1988	Marc Storace – lead vocals; Fernando von Arb – lead and rhythm guitar, bass, piano, backing vocals; Mark Kohler – rhythm and lead guitar, bass; Chris von Rohr – bass, percussion, piano; Dani Crivelli – drums, percussion	Heart Attack (1988)
September 1988 – January 1989	Björn Lodin – lead vocals; Many Maurer – lead guitar; Mark Kohler – rhythm guitar; Chris von Rohr – bass, keyboards, percussion, backing vocals; Dani Crivelli – drums, percussion	none
Band inactive January 1989 – January 1990
January 1990 – June 1991	Peter Tanner – lead vocals; Many Maurer – lead guitar, bass; Tony Castell – rhythm guitar, bass, backing vocals; Fernando von Arb – bass, rhythm and lead guitar, keyboards; Peter Haas – drums, percussion; Jurg Naegeli – keyboards, bass	Stampede (1990)
Band inactive June 1991 – January 1994
January 1994 – October 1995	Marc Storace – lead vocals; Fernando von Arb – lead and rhythm guitar, keyboards, bass; Mark Kohler – rhythm guitar, bass; Jürg Naegeli – keyboards, bass; Many Maurer – bass, lead guitar; Freddy Steady – drums, percussion	"You Ain't Seen Nothin' Yet" (1994); To Rock or Not to Be (1995)
Band inactive October 1995 – March 1999
March–October 1999	Carl Sentance – lead vocals; Fernando von Arb – lead and rhythm guitar, bass, piano, backing vocals; Chris Lauper – rhythm guitar; Many Maurer – bass, lead guitar, backing vocals; Peter Haas – drums, percussion	Round 13 (1999)
October 1999 – September 2000	Carl Sentance – lead vocals; Fernando von Arb – lead guitar, keyboards, backing vocals; Chris Lauper – rhythm guitar; Many Maurer – bass; Cliff Rodgers – drums	none
September 2000 – April 2002	Carl Sentance – lead vocals; Fernando von Arb – lead guitar, keyboards, backing vocals; Dave Stettler – rhythm guitar; Tony Castell – bass, backing vocals; Marcel Kopp – drums	none
April 2002 – February 2005	Marc Storace – lead vocals; Fernando von Arb – lead guitar, bass, keyboards, backing vocals; Dominique Favez – rhythm and lead guitar; Tony Castell – bass, rhythm guitar, backing vocals; Patrick Aeby – drums, percussion	Rock the Block (2003); Fire and Gasoline Live (2004)
February–November 2005	Marc Storace – lead vocals; Mandy Meyer – lead guitar; Dominique Favez – rhythm guitar; Tony Castell – bass, backing vocals; Patrick Aeby – drums, percussion	none
January 2006 – February 2008	Marc Storace – lead vocals; Mandy Meyer – lead guitar; Dominique Favez – rhythm guitar; Dennis Ward – keyboards (session); Tony Castell – bass; Stefan Schwarzmann – drums, percussion	Hellraiser (2006)
Band inactive February–April 2008
April – May 2008	Marc Storace – lead vocals; Fernando von Arb – guitar, keyboards, backing vocals; Chris von Rohr – bass, keyboards, percussion, backing vocals; Freddy Steady – drums, percussion	none
May 2008 – May 2011	Marc Storace – lead vocals; Fernando von Arb – lead and rhythm guitar, piano, bass, backing vocals; Mark Kohler – rhythm and lead guitar, bass; Chris von Rohr – bass, piano, percussion, backing vocals; Freddy Steady – drums, percussion	Hoodoo (2010)
May 2011 – December 2012	Marc Storace – lead vocals; Fernando von Arb – lead guitar, keyboards, backing vocals; Mark Kohler – rhythm guitar; Chris von Rohr – bass, keyboards, percussion, backing vocals; Kosta Zafiriou – drums, percussion (initially touring)	none
December 2012 – January 2013	Marc Storace – lead vocals; Fernando von Arb – lead and rhythm guitar, piano, bass, backing vocals; Mandy Meyer – lead guitar; Mark Kohler – rhythm guitar, bass; Chris von Rohr – bass, piano, percussion, backing vocals; Kosta Zafiriou – drums, percussion	Dirty Dynamite (2013)
January – May 2013	Marc Storace – lead vocals; Fernando von Arb – lead and rhythm guitar, keyboards, backing vocals; Mandy Meyer – lead guitar; Mark Kohler – rhythm guitar; Chris von Rohr – bass, keyboards, percussion, backing vocals; Daniel "Dani" Löble – drums, percussion (touring)	none
May 2013 – March 2014	Marc Storace – lead vocals; Fernando von Arb – lead and rhythm guitar, keyboards, backing vocals; Mandy Meyer – lead guitar; Mark Kohler – rhythm guitar; Chris von Rohr – bass, keyboards, percussion, backing vocals; Flavio Mezzodi – drums, percussion	Long Stick Goes Boom: Live from da House of Rust (2014)
April 2014 – July 2015	Marc Storace – lead vocals; Fernando von Arb – lead guitar, backing vocals; Dominique Favez – rhythm guitar; Chris von Rohr – bass, keyboards, backing vocals; Flavio Mezzodi – drums, percussion	none
August 2015 – present	Marc Storace – lead vocals; Fernando von Arb – lead and rhythm guitar, keyboards, backing vocals; Mandy Meyer – lead guitar; Mark Kohler – rhythm guitar; Chris von Rohr – bass, keyboards, percussion, backing vocals; Flavio Mezzodi – drums, percussion	Big Rocks (2017)
