= Alive and Screamin' =

- Cover art by Les Edwards

Live album by Krokus
- Released: October 1986
- Recorded: Amarillo, Texas, Cincinnati, Ohio, Baltimore, Maryland and Toronto, Canada with Remote Recording Services Mobile, Poughkeepsie, New York with Westwood One Mobile, 1986
- Genre: Hard rock, heavy metal
- Length: 41:59
- Label: Arista
- Producer: Tony Platt

Krokus chronology
Change of Address (1986)	Alive and Screamin' (1986)	Heart Attack (1988)

Singles from Alive and Screamin'
- 1. "Screaming in the Night" Released: 1986 (special promo single)

Professional ratings
Review scores
Source	Rating
AllMusic	2/5 stars
Collector's Guide to Heavy Metal	5/10

Alive and Screamin' is the first live album by the Swiss hard rock band Krokus, recorded on their tour of the United States and Canada in 1986.

== Track listing ==
Side one
No.	Title	Writer(s)	From the album	Length
1.	"Long Stick Goes Boom"	Fernando von Arb, Chris von Rohr, Marc Storace	One Vice at a Time (1982)	5:38
2.	"Eat the Rich"	von Arb, von Rohr, Storace, Butch Stone	Headhunter (1983)	4:55
3.	"Screaming in the Night"	von Arb, von Rohr, Storace, Stone, Mark Kohler	Headhunter	6:00
4.	"Hot Shot City"	Tommy Keiser, Jeff Klaven, Storace, Kohler	Change of Address (1986)	4:00

Side two
No.	Title	Writer(s)	From the album	Length
5.	"Midnite Maniac"	Storace, von Arb	The Blitz (1984)	4:11
6.	"Bedside Radio"	von Arb, von Rohr, Jürg Naegeli	Metal Rendez-Vous (1980)	3:19
7.	"Lay Me Down" (previously unreleased)	Bob Marlette, Sue Shifrin		3:33
8.	"Stayed Awake All Night" (Bachman–Turner Overdrive cover)	Randy Bachman	Headhunter	5:46
9.	"Headhunter"	von Arb, von Rohr, Storace, Stone	Headhunter	4:45

== Personnel ==
Krokus

- Marc Storace – vocals
- Fernando von Arb – lead guitar
- Mark Kohler – rhythm guitar
- Tommy Keiser – bass
- Jeff Klaven – drums, percussion
- Jai Winding – keyboards

Production

- Tony Platt – producer, engineer, mixing at Right Track Recording, New York City
- George Marino – mastering at Sterling Sound, New York

== Charts ==
Chart (1987)	Peak position
US Billboard 200	97
