= Hellraiser (album) =

Studio album by Krokus
- Released: 15 September 2006
- Recorded: House of Audio, Winterbach, Germany; Digital Arts Studio, Basel, Switzerland
- Length: 55:55
- Label: AFM
- Producers: Dennis Ward, Marc Storace

Krokus chronology
Rock the Block (2003)	Hellraiser (2006)	Hoodoo (2010)

Professional ratings
Review scores
Source	Rating
Allmusic	3.5/5 stars
Blabbermouth.net	5.5/10 stars

Hellraiser is the fifteenth studio album by the Swiss hard rock band Krokus. It marks 30 years since the release of their first album, Krokus, in 1976. It is also their first album on the German record label AFM Records. Armand "Mandy" Meyer featured as lead guitarist, replacing Fernando von Arb. The album was also released in a DigiPack format with a bonus track, "Walking in the Spirit".

Hellraiser peaked at No. 200 on the Billboard Top 200 album chart, the first to do so since 1988's Heart Attack. It peaked at No. 2 in the Swiss Album chart and was certified Gold in Switzerland.

== Track listing ==
1. "Hellraiser" (Marc Storace) – 3:37
2. "Too Wired to Sleep" (Tony Castell, Storace) – 2:44
3. "Hangman" (Dominique Favez, Storace) – 4:06
4. "Angel of My Dreams" (Castell, Storace) – 3:47
5. "Fight On" (Mandy Meyer, Storace) – 5:02
6. "So Long" (Meyer, Storace) – 4:30
7. "Spirit of the Night" (Meyer, Storace) – 4:01
8. "Midnite Fantasy" (Storace) – 4:10
9. "No Risk No Gain" (Favez, Storace) – 3:52
10. "Turnin' Inside Out" (Meyer, Storace) – 3:51
11. "Take My Love" (Favez, Storace) – 4:57
12. "Justice" (Charly Preissel, Storace) – 3:46
13. "Love Will Survive" (Favez, Castell, Storace) – 3:37
14. "Rocks Off!" (Castell, Storace) – 3:54

Japanese edition bonus track

15. "Hellraiser" (live) – 3:46

Digipak edition bonus track

15. "Walking in the Spirit" – 2:38

== Personnel ==
Band members

- Marc Storace – vocals, vocal producer
- Mandy Meyer – lead guitar
- Dominique Favez – rhythm guitar
- Tony Castell – bass
- Stefan Schwarzmann – drums, percussion
- Dennis Ward – keyboards, producer, engineer, mixing

Production

- Jürgen Lusky – mastering

== Charts ==
Chart (2006)	Peak position
Swiss Albums (Schweizer Hitparade)	2
Billboard 200 (USA)	200

== Certifications ==
Region	Certification	Certified units/sales
Switzerland (IFPI Switzerland)	Gold	15,000^{^}
^{^} Shipments figures based on certification alone.
