= Stampede (Krokus album) =

Studio album by Krokus
- Released: 14 November 1990
- Studio: Pink Tonstudios, Zuchwil, Switzerland
- Genre: Hard rock, heavy metal
- Length: 60:35
- Label: Phonag
- Producer: Fernando von Arb, Pedro Haldemann, Many Maurer

Krokus chronology
Heart Attack (1988)	Stampede (1990)	To Rock or Not to Be (1995)

Professional ratings
Review scores
Source	Rating
AllMusic	3/5 stars
Collector's Guide to Heavy Metal	5/10
Kerrang!	1/5 stars

Stampede is the eleventh studio album by Swiss hard rock band Krokus. It features an almost completely different line-up to that of their last album (with the exception of Fernando von Arb), and was recorded near the band's home town of Solothurn by Jürg Naegeli, a former member of the band.

It was also the first Krokus album since 1978's Painkiller not to feature Marc Storace on lead vocals. His replacement, Peter Tanner, had previously been a member of Swiss bands Witchcraft, Bloody Six and Headhunter as well as a voice actor in the late 1970s. Stampede is also marks the Krokus studio debut for Many Maurer, a bandmate of Tanner's in Headhunter and founding member of Killer. The album reached No. 18 in the Swiss album charts.

In 2000, Tanner and Storace would unite to record the D/C World album (with Tony Castell on bass), consisting of 5 strung together blocks of passages from 30 different AC/DC songs, with Tanner singing the Brian Johnson parts and Storace in the Bon Scott role.

== Track listing ==
All songs by Fernando von Arb, Many Maurer and Peter Tanner, except where indicated

1. "Stampede" – 4:41
2. "Electric Man" – 5:24
3. "Rock 'n' Roll Gypsy" – 4:35
4. "Shotgun Boogie" (von Arb, Maurer, Tanner, Patrick Mason) – 5:25
5. "Nova-Zano" (von Arb, Maurer, Tanner, Mason) – 6:28
6. "Street Love" – 4:32
7. "Good Times" – 4:43
8. "She Drives Me Crazy" (von Arb, Maurer, Tanner, Mason) – 5:15
9. "In the Heat of the Night" (von Arb) – 7:02
10. "Rhythm of Love" (von Arb, Maurer, Tanner, Mason) – 5:24
11. "Wasteland" (Maurer, Tanner) – 7:08

== Personnel ==
Krokus

- Peter Tanner – vocals
- Many Maurer – lead guitar, bass, co-producer
- Tony Castell – rhythm guitar, bass, backing vocals
- Fernando von Arb – bass, acoustic guitar, electric guitar, keyboards, producer
- Peter Haas – drums, percussion
- Jurg Naegeli – keyboards, bass

Additional musicians

- Rahel Studer – cello on "Nova-Zano"
- Chris Egger – backing vocals

Production

- Jürg Naegeli – engineer, mixing assistant
- Pedro Haldemann – co-producer, mixing assistant
- Hanspeter Huber – mixing at Soundville Studios, Lucern, Switzerland
- Katrin Brändli – mixing assistant
- Ian Cooper – mastering at Townhouse Studios, London

== Charts ==
Chart (1990)	Peak position
Swiss Albums (Schweizer Hitparade)	18
