= To Rock or Not to Be =

Studio album by Krokus
- Released: 29 April 1995
- Recorded: Winter 1994/1995
- Studio: Pink Tonstudio, Zuchwil, Switzerland
- Genre: Hard rock, heavy metal
- Length: 54:41
- Label: Phonag
- Producer: Fernando von Arb, Many Maurer

Krokus chronology
Stampede (1990)	To Rock or Not to Be (1995)	Round 13 (1999)

Alt cover
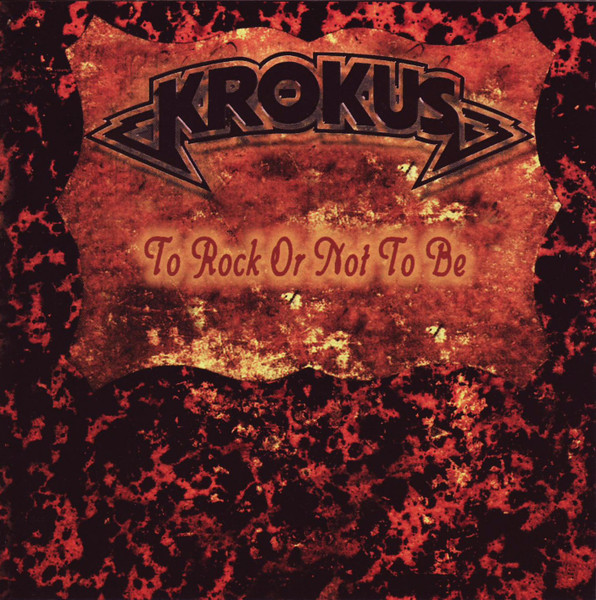

Singles from To Rock Or Not To Be
- 1. "To Rock Or Not To Be" Released: 29 April 1995

Professional ratings
Review scores
Source	Rating
AllMusic	3/5 stars
Collector's Guide to Heavy Metal	8/10

To Rock or Not to Be is the twelfth studio album by the Swiss hard rock band Krokus, released in 1995. The album stayed seven weeks in the top ten of the Swiss charts, peaking at number 5.

The album briefly reunited 4/5th of the One Vice at a Time line-up, with only bassist Chris von Rohr missing who was working as a producer and songwriter for Swiss act Gotthard at the time.

== Track listing ==
1. "Lion Heart" (Fernando von Arb, Jürg Naegeli, Marc Storace) – 5:16
2. "Flying Through the Night" (von Arb, Naegeli, Many Maurer, Storace) – 3:56
3. "To Rock or Not to Be" (von Arb, Storace) – 3:23
4. "In the Dead of Night" (von Arb, Maurer, Storace) – 5:07
5. "Natural Blonde" (von Arb, Naegeli, Maurer, Storace) – 5:12
6. "Doggy Style" (von Arb, Freddy Steady, Naegeli, Maurer, Storace, Mark Kohler) – 4:02
7. "Talking Like a Shotgun" (von Arb, Steady, Naegeli, Maurer, Storace, Kohler) – 4:08
8. "Soul to Soul" (von Arb, Naegeli, Maurer, Storace) – 4:55
9. "Stop the World" (von Arb, Naegeli) – 5:14
10. "You Ain't Got the Guts to Do It" (von Arb, Naegeli, Maurer, Storace, Kohler) – 3:06
11. "Wagon Gone" (Naegeli, Maurer, Storace, Kohler) – 5:01
12. "Stormy Nights" (von Arb, Naegeli, Maurer, Storace, Kohler) – 5:14

== Personnel ==
Krokus

- Marc Storace – lead vocals
- Fernando von Arb – lead guitar, rhythm guitar, keyboards, bass, producer
- Mark Kohler – rhythm guitar, bass
- Many Maurer – bass, lead guitar, producer, engineer
- Freddy "Steady" Frutig – drums, percussion
- Jurg Naegeli – keyboards, bass, mixing, engineering

Additional musicians

- Andy Portmann, Chris Egger, Tony Castell – backing vocals

Production

- Ian Cooper – mastering

== Charts ==
Chart (1995)	Peak position
Swiss Albums (Schweizer Hitparade)	5
