= Long Stick Goes Boom: Live from da House of Rust =

Live album by Krokus
- Released: 24 March 2014 (Europe); 22 April 2014 (North America)
- Recorded: 30 August 2013
- Venue: At Kofmehl, Solothurn
- Genre: Hard rock, heavy metal

Professional ratings
Review scores
Source	Rating
AllMusic	(Favorable)
Blabbermouth.net	8/10 stars

Long Stick Goes Boom: Live from da House of Rust (also known as Long Stick Goes Boom – Live from da House of Rust and by other titles) is a live album by melodic hard rock band Krokus. Released on 24 March 2014 in Europe and 22 April 2014 in North America by the label Columbia, it was recorded on 30 August 2013 at the "House of Rust" venue in Solothurn, Switzerland. The album has received praise from publications such as AllMusic and Blabbermouth.net, and it peaked at the #3 position on the official Swiss album chart.

== Background and contents ==
The album was recorded in front of a rowdy, upbeat "hometown crowd", with the concert taking place in Solothurn, Switzerland on 30 August 2013. Its title comes the group's song "Long Stick Goes Boom" (also known as just "Long Stick"), which is a track initially from the 1982 album One Vice at a Time. That song has been one of Krokus' most popular hits over their career (peaking at #22 in the U.S., for example), and a version of it incorporating elements of the Who's track "Pinball Wizard" begins the release.

Krokus' members have felt their studio albums don't quite capture their natural sound, as played on stage before a live audience, which is a factor that frontman Marc Storace has called "frustrating to hear". As well, the live album aimed to capture the distinct abilities and performance styles of the band's three guitarists. After everything finished, Storace felt pleased with Live from da House of Rust due to its "animalistic" feel.

The album captures the group as a six-man line-up made up of Mark Kohler, Mandy Meyer, Flavío Mezzodi, Marc Storace, Fernando Von Arb, and Chris Von Rohr. As well, Chris Von Rohr contributed to the album's production work. The release's track selection encompasses multiple decades of the group's history while having a relative emphasis on their recent work from the 2000s and 2010s.

Speaking about the recording venue, frontman Storace has remarked:

"That is where Krokus was born. The 'House of Rust' is our nickname in English for the venue. The place looks like a huge rusty tube; that's what it looks like... next to a river, and it is a great place to hang out in the summer. The place is known all over Switzerland, and people come and watch bands play here throughout the year... from all over the world. Any band that comes through Switzerland makes it to the House of Rust. We've been using it as our rehearsal space since the reunion of 2008."

== Critical and commercial response ==
AllMusic published a supportive review by music critic Gregory Heaney, who remarked that "the band delivers an energetic set that'll easily make listeners forget these guys have been at it" for about four decades. He additionally remarked that Live From da House of Rust "bundles the stalwart rock band's stage presence into a nice little package, giving you the best seat in the house". Blabbermouth.net also ran a positive review, with Ray Van Horn Jr. writing that frontman Storace "sounds like he's in full defiance of time and he's having a ball at this concert".

Commercially, the album achieved success in the band's native country, with Live From da House of Rust peaking at the #3 position on the official Swiss album chart. The release spent a total of nine weeks on said chart.

== Track listing ==
1. "Long Stick Goes Boom" (also credited as "Long Stick") (Fernando von Arb/Chris von Rohr/Marc Storace)
2. "Hallelujah Rock 'N' Roll" (Mark Kohler/Chris von Rohr/Marc Storace)
3. "Go Baby Go" (Fernando von Arb/Chris von Rohr/Marc Storace)
4. "American Woman" (Randy Bachman/Burton Cummings/Jim Kale/Garry Peterson)
5. "Tokyo Nights" (Fernando von Arb/Jürg Naegeli/Chris von Rohr)
6. "Fire" (Fernando von Arb/Chris von Rohr)
7. "Rock City"/"Better than Sex"/"Dog Song"
8. "Screaming in the Night"(von Rohr, von Arb, Mark Kohler, Storace, Stone) – 6:38
9. "Hellraiser" (Marc Storace)
10. "Bedside Radio" (Fernando von Arb, Chris von Rohr and Jürg Naegeli) – 3:37
11. "Easy Rocker" (Fernando von Arb and Chris von Rohr) – 4:41
12. "Heatstrokes" (Fernando von Arb and Chris von Rohr) – 4:49
13. "Live for the Action"
14. "Hoodoo Woman"
1. Marc Storace
2. Chris von Rohr
3. Fernando von Arb
4. Mark Kohler
5. Mandy Meyer
6. Flavio Mezzodi

== Charts ==
Chart (2014)	Peak position
Swiss Albums (Schweizer Hitparade)	3

== See also ==
- Krokus discography
