= Jumpin' In (disambiguation) =

Jumpin' In is an album by Dave Holland, as well as its title track.

Jumpin' In may also refer to:

- "Jumpin' In", a song by Krokus from their self-titled debut album
- "Jumpin' In", a song by Joe Satriani from his album Unstoppable Momentum
