= Heart Attack (Krokus album) =

- Cover art by Chris Achilleos

Studio album by Krokus
- Released: 25 March 1988
- Studios: Pink Tonstudios, Zuchwil, Switzerland
- Genres: Hard rock; glam metal
- Length: 47:17
- Label: MCA
- Producers: Fernando von Arb; Chris von Rohr

Krokus chronology
Alive and Screamin' (1986)	Heart Attack (1988)	Stampede (1990)

Singles from Heart Attack
- 1. "Wild Love" Released: April 1988; 2. "Let It Go" Released: 1988; 3. "Everybody Rocks" Released: 1988

Professional ratings
Review scores
Source	Rating
AllMusic	2.5/5 stars
Collector's Guide to Heavy Metal	6/10

Heart Attack is the tenth studio album by the Swiss hard rock band Krokus, and is described by the band as "the last attempt to keep the band together in a deep crisis". As well as being the band's first album on MCA Records, it saw the return of original Krokus founding member Chris von Rohr.

Heart Attack is the only Krokus album to feature drummer Dani Crivelli who played drums on von Rohr's 1987 solo album, Hammer & Tongue, and previously recorded and toured with Solothurn rivals Killer. In the early 1980s, Crivelli was a member of Detroit, a hard rock band that featured Krokus guitarist Fernando von Arb's then wife, Birthe von Arb, on lead vocals.

The track "Rock 'n' Roll Tonight" was a live hit and is still played by the band in concerts.

== Contemporary reviews ==
In the June 1988 issue of Circus magazine, music critic Paul Gallotta noted that the debut release for their new label signaled a gradual shift into a more commercially oriented territory. The reviewer observed that the vocal performance of frontman Marc Storace appeared more subdued and melodic than on prior efforts, with a few notable exceptions such as "Everybody Rock" and the Judas Priest-influenced track "Axx Attack." While Gallotta emphasized that the Swiss formation still retained their ability to deliver heavy, high-energy rock when required, the publication ultimately described the overall sonic character of the record as a stylistic cross between the melodic approach of Bon Jovi and the aggressive vocal delivery reminiscent of AC/DC's Brian Johnson.

== Track listing ==
All songs written by Krokus, except where indicated

Side one

1. "Everybody Rocks" - 3:50
2. "Wild Love" - 4:01
3. "Let It Go" - 4:31
4. "Winning Man" (Fernando von Arb, Chris von Rohr) - 5:15 (originally on Hardware)
5. "Axx Attack" - 4:24

Side two

6. "Rock 'n' Roll Tonight" - 3:58
7. "Flyin' High" (Krokus, Jürg Naegeli) - 4:14
8. "Shoot Down the Night" - 4:37
9. "Bad, Bad Girl" - 5:58
10. "Speed Up" - 6:24

== Personnel ==
Krokus

- Marc Storace – Vocals
- Fernando von Arb – Lead and rhythm guitar, bass, piano
- Mark Kohler – Rhythm and lead guitar, bass
- Chris von Rohr – Bass, piano, percussion, drums
- Dani Crivelli – Drums, percussion

Production

- Jürg Naegeli – Engineer, mixing assistant
- Michael Wagener – Mixing at The Enterprise, Los Angeles, California
- Scott Blockland – Mixing assistant
- Stephen Marcussen – Mastering
- Chris Achilleos – Cover illustration
- Richard Evans – Art direction and design

== Charts ==
Chart (1988)	Peak position
Finnish Albums (The Official Finnish Charts)	36
Swiss Albums (Schweizer Hitparade)	5
US Billboard 200	87
