= Round 13 =

Studio album by Krokus
- Released: 8 October 1999
- Recorded: Switzerland, Spring 1999
- Studios: Watermill Studio, Brübach Oberbüren, canton St. Gallen.
- Genres: Hard rock; heavy metal
- Length: 40:47
- Labels: Phonag; Angel Air
- Producers: Fernando von Arb; Many Maurer

Krokus chronology
To Rock or Not to Be (1995)	Round 13 (1999)	Rock the Block (2003)

Professional ratings
Review scores
Source	Rating
Allmusic	1.5/5 stars

Round 13 is the thirteenth studio album by the Swiss hard rock band Krokus, and the only album to feature Welsh vocalist Carl Sentance, formerly of Persian Risk and the Geezer Butler Band. It includes a cover of "Heya" by J. J. Light (a.k.a. Jim Stallings from Sir Douglas Quintet).

The album was mixed by Tony Platt.

== Track listing ==
All songs by Fernando von Arb, except where indicated.

1. "Heya" (Bob Markley, Jim Stallings) - 4:16
2. "Money Back" (von Arb, Many Maurer) - 4:31
3. "Break Free" - 3:52
4. "Guitar Rules" - 2:58
5. "Blood Comes Easy" - 4:51
6. "Suck My Guitar" - 3:55
7. "Gipsy Love" - 4:44
8. "Whitchhunt" - 3:59
9. "Backstabber" - 4:16
10. "Wild Times" - 3:17

== Personnel ==
Band members

- Carl Sentance - vocals
- Fernando von Arb - guitars, bass, piano, backing vocals, producer
- Chris Lauper - guitars
- Many Maurer - bass, guitars, backing vocals, producer
- Peter Haas - drums, percussion

Additional musicians

- Andy Portmann, Chris Egger, Claudio Matteo - backing vocals

Production

- Tony Platt - mixing, mastering
- Ray Staff - mastering

== Charts ==
Chart (1999)	Peak position
Swiss Albums (Schweizer Hitparade)	35
