= Rock the Block =

Studio album by Krokus
- Released: 18 January 2003
- Recorded: Soundlake Studios, Lausanne; Digital Air Studio, Basel, Switzerland; February–November 2002
- Genres: Hard rock, heavy metal
- Length: 55:07
- Label: Warner Music Group
- Producers: Fernando von Arb, Dominique Favez, Patrick Aeby, Marc Storace

Krokus chronology
Round 13 (1999)	Rock the Block (2003)	Hellraiser (2006)

Professional ratings
Review scores
Source	Rating
Allmusic	3.5/5 stars

Rock the Block is the fourteenth studio album by the Swiss hard rock band Krokus, released in 2003. The album peaked at No. 1 in the Swiss Album Chart and was certified Gold in Switzerland.

== Track listing ==
All songs by Fernando von Arb and Marc Storace, except where indicated

1. "Mad World" - 3:56
2. "Leading the Pack" - 3:34
3. "I Want It All" (Tony Castell, von Arb, Storace) - 4:08
4. "Open Fire" - 5:09
5. "One for All" - 3:36
6. "Looking to America" - 4:10
7. "Go My Way" - 4:14
8. "Hot Shot" (Castell, von Arb, Storace) - 3:34
9. "Raise Your Hands" - 3:53
10. "Night of the Snakes" - 3:32
11. "Throwing Her China" - 4:11
12. "We'll Rise" - 4:56
13. "Freedom" (Charles Stettler, von Arb, Storace) - 3:52
14. "Rock the Block" - 2:25

== Personnel ==
Band members

- Marc Storace – vocals, producer
- Fernando von Arb – guitars, bass, keyboards, producer
- Dominique Favez – guitars, producer, engineer, mixing
- Tony Castell – bass, guitars
- Patrick Aeby – drums, percussion, producer, engineer, mixing

Additional musicians

- Mark Edward – backing vocals

Production

- George Marino – mastering at Sterling Sound, New York

== Charts ==
Chart (2003)	Peak position
German Albums (Offizielle Top 100)	69
Swiss Albums (Schweizer Hitparade)	1

== Certifications ==
Region	Certification	Certified units/sales
Switzerland (IFPI Switzerland)	Gold	20,000^{^}
^{^} Shipments figures based on certification alone.
