= Pain Killer (Krokus album) =

Studio album by Krokus
- Released: October 1978: August 1982 (US; as Pay It in Metal)
- Recorded: June 1978
- Studios: The Manor, Shipton-on-Cherwell
- Genres: Hard rock; boogie rock
- Length: 34:07
- Label: Mercury
- Producer: Harry Sprenger

Krokus chronology
To You All (1977)	Pain Killer (1978)	Metal Rendez-vous (1980)

Singles from Pain Killer
- 1. "Susie" Released: 1978

Alternative covers
- Pay It in Metal US cover

Alternative cover
- Pay It in Metal German cover

Professional ratings
Review scores
Source	Rating
AllMusic	2/5 stars

Pain Killer is the third studio album by the Swiss hard rock band Krokus, released in October 1978, through Mercury.

== About the album ==
Pain Killer was recorded at The Manor Studio in Shipton-on-Cherwell, England, and took just six days of June to produce.

The album was also released with the title Pay It in Metal, and featured different covers for different regions. In all, five different covers were released, all containing exactly the same tracks.

== Track listing ==
All tracks are written by Fernando von Arb and Chris von Rohr, except where noted.

Side A
No.	Title	Writer(s)	Length
1.	"Killer"		3:34
2.	"Werewolf"	Freddy Steady, von Arb, von Rohr	3:19
3.	"Rock Ladies"		3:01
4.	"Bad Love"		4:53
5.	"Get Out of My Mind"		3:40

Side B
No.	Title	Writer(s)	Length
6.	"Rock Me, Rock You"		3:20
7.	"Deadline"	Tommy Kiefer, von Rohr	2:01
8.	"Susie"		3:02
9.	"Pay It"		3:01
10.	"Bye Bye Baby"		4:16
Total length:			34:07

== Personnel ==
Krokus

- Chris von Rohr – vocals, percussion
- Tommy Kiefer – guitar
- Fernando von Arb – guitar, bass
- Jürg Naegeli – bass, keyboards
- Freddy Steady – drums

Production

- Harry Sprenger – producer, mixing
- Mick Glossop – engineer
- Alan Douglas – assistant engineer
