= Headhunter (album) =

Studio album by Krokus
- Released: April 25, 1983
- Studios: Bee Jay Studios, Orlando, Florida
- Genres: Hard rock; heavy metal
- Length: 37:18
- Label: Arista
- Producer: Tom Allom

Krokus chronology
One Vice at a Time (1982)	Headhunter (1983)	The Blitz (1984)

Singles from Headhunter
- 1. "Screaming in the Night" Released: May 1983 (US); 2. "Eat the Rich" Released: 1983 (Australia); 3. "Stayed Awake All Night" Released: September 1983 (US)

Professional ratings
Review scores
Source	Rating
AllMusic	4/5 stars
Collector's Guide to Heavy Metal	9/10

Headhunter is the seventh studio album by Swiss hard rock band Krokus, released on April 25, 1983. It achieved Gold status in the United States. "Screaming in the Night", the band's biggest hit to date, is still played on classic rock radio stations. Headhunter is the only Krokus album to feature Steve Pace on drums, and includes the Bachman–Turner Overdrive cover "Stayed Awake All Night".

UK-based company Rock Candy Records reissued the album on CD in 2014.

== Track listing ==
All tracks are written by Chris von Rohr, Fernando von Arb, Marc Storace and Butch Stone except where noted.

Side A
No.	Title	Length
1.	"Headhunter"	4:30
2.	"Eat the Rich"	4:14
3.	"Screaming in the Night"	6:38
4.	"Ready to Burn"	3:54

Side B
No.	Title	Writer(s)	Length
5.	"Night Wolf" (written for the animated motion picture Metal Hollywood)		4:10
6.	"Stayed Awake All Night" (Bachman–Turner Overdrive cover)	Randy Bachman	4:41
7.	"Stand and Be Counted"		4:07
8.	"White Din"	von Rohr, von Arb	1:50
9.	"Russian Winter"		3:31

== Personnel ==
Krokus

- Marc Storace – lead vocals
- Fernando von Arb – lead and rhythm guitar, bass, piano
- Mark Kohler – rhythm and lead guitar, bass
- Chris von Rohr – bass, piano, drums, percussion
- Steve Pace – drums, percussion

Additional musicians

- Rob Halford – backing vocals on "Ready to Burn"
- Jimi Jamison – backing vocals on "Screaming in the Night"
- Bob Ketchum – sound effects recorded at Cedar Crest Studios

Production

- Tom Allom – producer
- Andy De Ganahl – engineer
- Butch Stone – director

== Charts ==
=== Album ===
1983 chart performance for Headhunter
Chart (1983)	Peak position
Australian Albums (Kent Music Report)	72
Canada Top Albums/CDs (RPM)	31
New Zealand Albums (RMNZ)	35
Swedish Albums (Sverigetopplistan)	22
UK Albums (Official Charts)	74
US Billboard 200	25

2023 chart performance for Headhunter
Chart (2023)	Peak position
Swiss Albums (Schweizer Hitparade)	44

=== Singles ===
Year	Title	Chart	Position
1983	"Eat the Rich"	Hot Mainstream Rock Tracks (USA)	33
1983	"Screaming in the Night"	Hot Mainstream Rock Tracks (USA)	21
1983	"Stayed Awake All Night"	Hot Mainstream Rock Tracks (USA)	31

== Certifications ==
Region	Certification	Certified units/sales
Canada (Music Canada)	Gold	50,000^{^}
United States (RIAA)	Gold	500,000^{^}
^{^} Shipments figures based on certification alone.
