= To You All =

Studio album by Krokus
- Released: 1977 (original); 2023 (reissue)
- Recorded: December 1976–January 1977
- Studios: Sinus Studio, Bern
- Genre: Hard rock
- Length: 34:22
- Labels: Schnoutz (original); DÖG (reissue)
- Producer: Peter J. Mac Taggart

Krokus chronology
Krokus (1976)	To You All (1977)	Painkiller (1978)

Singles from To You All
- 1. "Highway Song" Released: 1977

Alternative cover

Professional ratings
Review scores
Source	Rating
AllMusic	1.5/5 stars

To You All is the second studio album by the Swiss hard rock band Krokus, released in 1977, through Schnoutz.

The line-up of Krokus changed radically from their debut album as founding members Chris von Rohr and Tommy Kiefer were joined by Fernando von Arb, Jürg Naegeli, and Freddy Steady, previously active as a trio under the name Montezuma. It was the first album to feature the Krokus logo on the cover and their first video clip was shot for "Highway Song". To You All had limited success in Switzerland.

== Track listing ==
All credits adapted from 2023 reissue LP.

Side A
No.	Title	Writer(s)	Lead vocals	Length
1.	"Highway Song"	Fernando von Arb, Chris von Rohr	von Rohr	4:01
2.	"To You All"	von Arb, von Rohr	von Rohr	2:27
3.	"Festival"	von Rohr	von Rohr	5:09
4.	"Move It On"	von Rohr, Tommy Kiefer	Peter Richard	3:26
5.	"Mr. Greedy"	Kiefer	Richard	3:22

Side B
No.	Title	Writer(s)	Lead vocals	Length
6.	"Lonesome Rider"	von Arb, von Rohr	von Rohr	2:37
7.	"Protection"	Kiefer	Richard	3:09
8.	"Trying Hard"	Kiefer	Kiefer	3:37
9.	"Don't Stop Playing"	Kiefer	von Rhor	3:06
10.	"Take It, Don't Leave It"	Kiefer	Chicken Fisher	3:29
Total length:				34:22

== Personnel ==
All credits adapted from 2023 reissue LP.

Krokus

- Chris von Rohr – lead vocals, percussion (tracks 1–3, 6); drums (track 4, 5, 7, 10; uncredited)
- Tommy Kiefer – guitar; vocals (tracks 8, 9; uncredited)
- Fernando von Arb – guitar, vocals (except tracks 4, 5, 7, 10)
- Jürg Naegeli – bass, vocals (except tracks 4, 5, 7, 10)
- Freddy Steady – drums, vocals (except track 4, 5, 7, 10)

Additional musicians

- Peter Richard – vocals (tracks 4, 5, 7)
- Remo Spadino – bass (tracks 4, 5, 7, 10)
- Chicken Fisher – guitar (track 4), vocals (track 10)
- Ben Jeger – organ (track 8)
- Hichi Szabo – keyboards (track 10)
