= Chris von Rohr =

Swiss musician and record producer

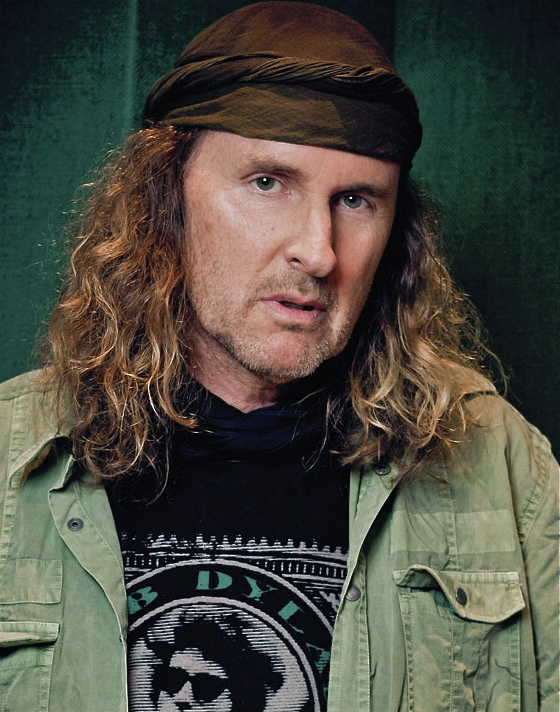
- Von Rohr in 2011

Background information
- Born: Christoph von Rohr; 24 October 1951 (age 74); Solothurn, Switzerland
- Genres: Hard rock, heavy metal
- Occupations: Musician, record producer
- Instruments: Bass guitar, vocals, keyboards, drums
- Years active: 1975–present
- Member of: Krokus

Christoph von Rohr (born 24 October 1951) is a Swiss musician and record producer, best known as a founding member of the hard rock band Krokus.

== History ==
=== Childhood, youth and first experiences as a musician (1951–1975) ===
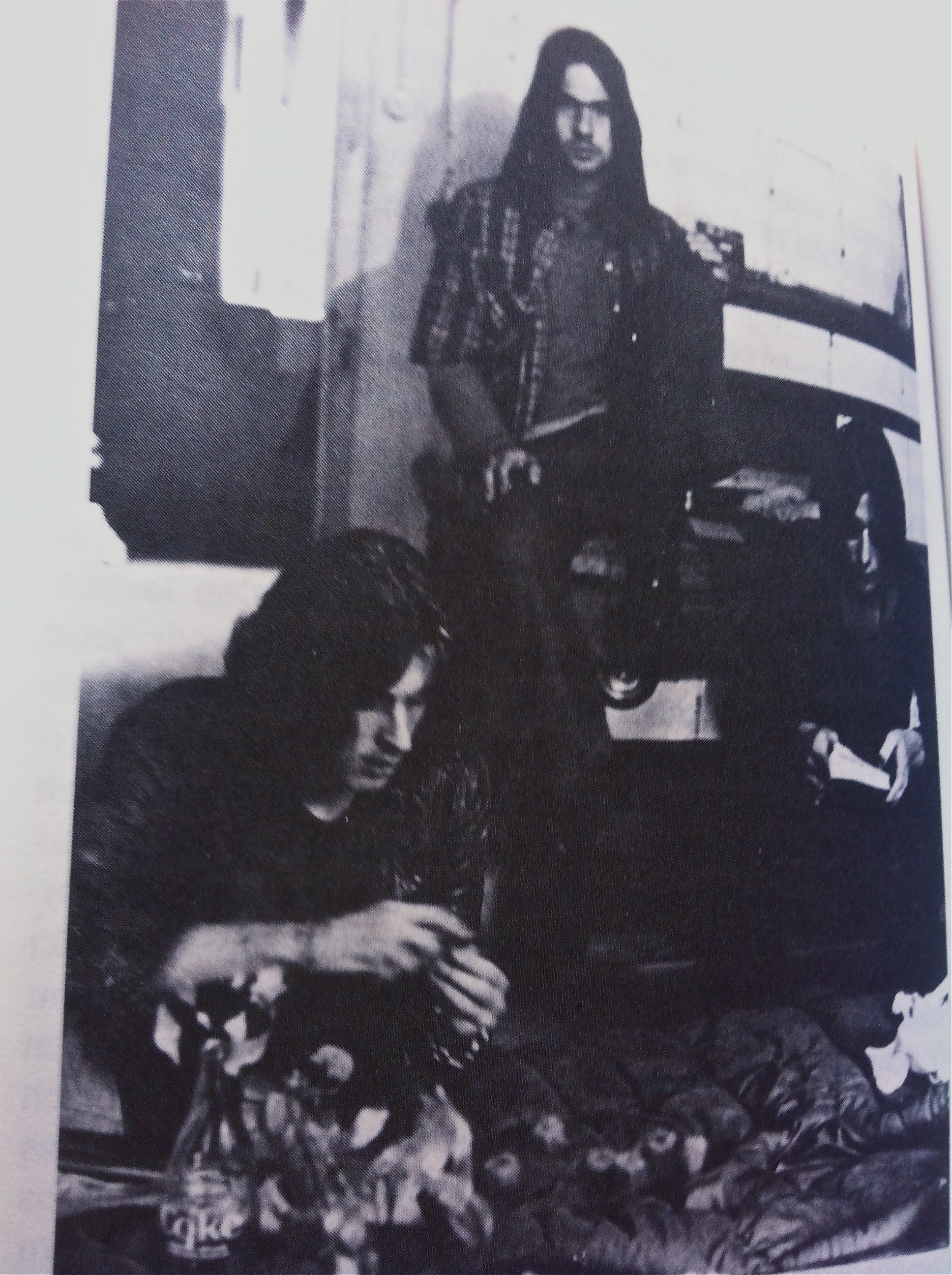
The Band Inside; left to right: Chris von Rohr, Peter Richard, Tommy Kiefer

Chris von Rohr, along with his half-brother Stephan von Rohr, comes from a middle-class family in Solothurn, where he spent most of his childhood. His first musical experience Chris von Rohr gained at his parents piano. During his school years in mostly local schools (apart from a brief interlude at a boarding school Lyceum Alpinum Zuoz – where he was able to play drums for the very first time), von Rohr's father gave him his first drum set as a gift. In 1967, he formed his first band called The Scouts. The band changed names multiple times, from Tears Of Love to In and finally Indian Summer. With this formation the young drummer also completed his first public appearance at a student ball in the Hotel Krone in Solothurn. After a two-year stint at the public business school in Neuchâtel von Rohr founded more bands: first, the Plastic Joints and thereafter Inside. Meanwhile, the musician von Rohr kept himself financially afloat as a cook in the Solothurn Restaurant & Hotel Kreuz – the first Genossenschaftsbeiz of Switzerland. After a for von Rohr in terms of musical style all in all very unpleasant but at least financially lucrative short stint with a dance band called On the Road, he and their keyboarder Michi Szabo formed the two- man band Night Train. However, all these attempts to make it in the professional music business failed and so von Rohr worked again as a cook at the Restaurant Kreuz, followed by a semester at the Jazz School in Bern.

=== Rise and international breakthrough with Krokus (1975–1983) ===
After finishing studies at the Jazz School, von Rohr returned to Solothurn to form another band in November 1975: Krokus. Their first public gig was opening for Nella Martinetti at the Saalbau of the Swiss town of Gerlafingen. Together with lead guitarist Tommy Kiefer, with whom drummer von Rohr alternated lead vocals, rhythm guitarist Hansi Droz and bassist Remo Spadino finally the very progressive debut album Krokus. was recorded and released in 1976, produced by Peter J. Mac Taggart. With the rights to the band name Krokus secured and his bandmates unceremoniously released, he formed a new alliance with band members of the local band Montezuma, changing the line-up of Krokus completely: Von Rohr himself took over lead vocals, Fernando von Arb played guitar, on bass Jürg Naegeli and Freddy Steady on the drums. Shortly thereafter, guitarist Tommy Kiefer was brought back to the line-up and the band was complete once again. With this line-up the band recorded once more at the Sinus Studio in Bern, produced again by Peter J. Mac Taggart and released in 1977 their second studio album To You All, which was released in 1977 and revealing for the first time a hard rock sound.

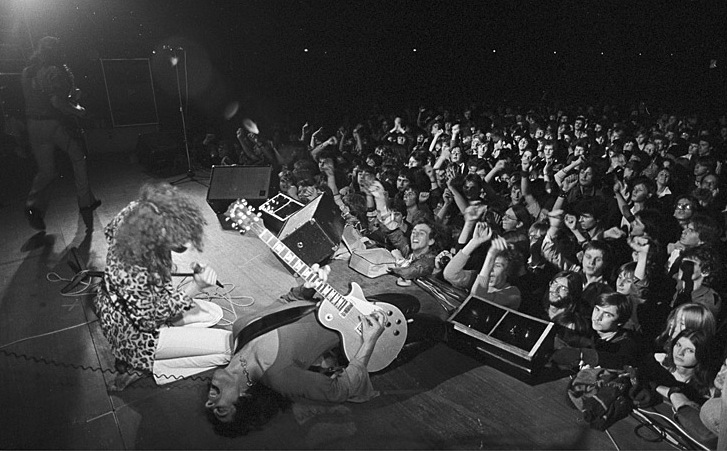
Von Rohr (on vocals) and Tommy Kiefer end of the 1970s

With the same line-up, still with von Rohr as front man, Krokus recorded their third, totally hard rock album Pain Killer, which was also released as Pay It in Metal. This album was recorded within six days in Manor Studios in Oxford in 1978, and produced by von Rohr and von Arb. Although von Rohr received from Switzerland's Pop Magazine (the equivalent of Rolling Stone magazine in the USA) the "Golden Hammer Award" as No. 1 vocalist and Krokus No. 1 rock band of the year in their home country of Switzerland, the band's future musical direction changed once more when all band members witnessed a concert by AC/DC at the Volkshaus in Zürich. Consequently, von Rohr had a vision and he voluntarily surrendered his vocal duties first to Henry Fries, who had to bow out because of prior contractual obligations, and finally – after persistent recruiting attempts by von Rohr himself – found in Marc Storace the singer with the powerful vocal range he envisioned. Von Rohr switched to bass and Jürg Naegeli was in charge of the band's keyboards and sound. The last missing piece of the puzzle fell in place with this new line-up for the perfect Krokus sound. Soon thereafter, the band recorded their fourth studio album Metal Rendez-Vous at Platinum One Studio in Zurich, produced by Martin Pearson, von Rohr and von Arb. This album proved to be the band's international breakthrough. Triple-platinum in Switzerland and first concert tours in Great Britain and the United States followed, including the "percussion battle" between von Rohr and drummer Freddy Steady.

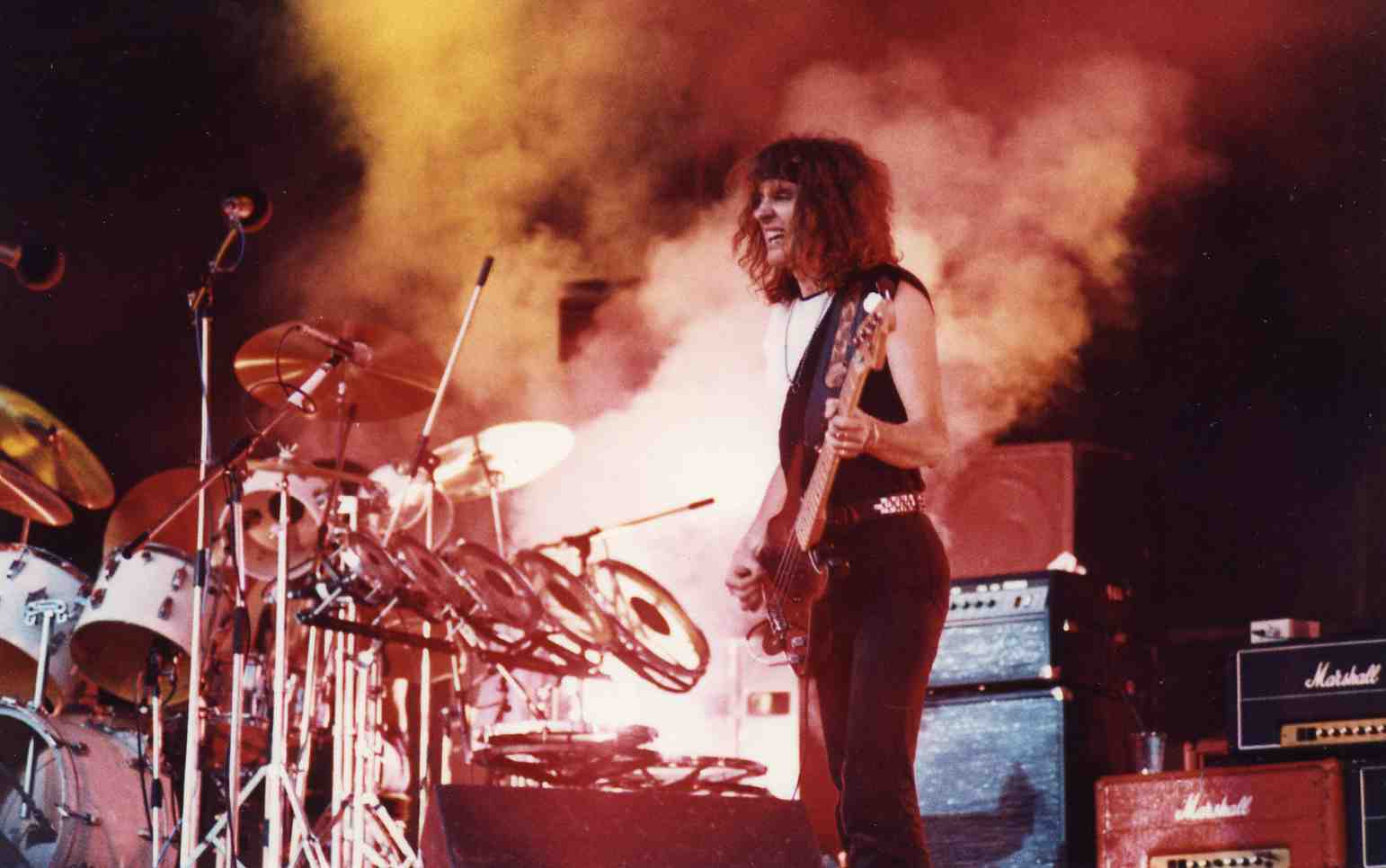
Von Rohr performing at Reading Festival in 1980

Immediately after the touring ended, the band went into Roundhouse Studios in London to work on their fifth studio album, which was again produced by von Rohr and von Arb, to be finally released in 1981 as Hardware. As with its predecessor, the album turned out to be a total success and earned gold status in Switzerland. As a result of continuing drug problems and unreliability of lead guitarist Kiefer, the first cracks in the band's structure became obvious and could not be ignored any longer. Although the band continued to rise in popularity. After the release of the album, the band and Kiefer went separate ways. Mandy Meyer replaced Kiefer for the tours throughout Europe and the USA. However, Krokus and Meyer went their separate ways immediately after completion of the tour. Without further ado rhythm guitarist Mark Kohler joined the band. This line-up eventually recorded at the Battery Studios in London – produced by Tony Platt, von Rohr and von Arb – their sixth studio album One Vice at a Time. Released in 1982, it not only validated the status of Krokus but raised it one notch higher. The album reached gold status not only in Switzerland but for the first time in the band's history earned gold status in the U.S. and Canada. On top of that Krokus set another record as the first and so far only Swiss band ever to sell out the Hallenstadion in Zurich. More extensive tours through North America and Europe followed the album release. In between all of Krokus' touring commitments, von Rohr managed to find time to produce Night Fighting, Steve Whitney Band's second studio album, this time as the sole producer in charge.

Meanwhile, Krokus lineup changes continued: Drummer Steady was dismissed and replaced by Steve Pace. What followed, however, was nothing less than the culmination and highlight of the band's career : the seventh studio album Headhunter, recorded by Tom Allom at Bee Jay Studio in Orlando, Florida, and released in 1983. This album earned for the first time and, unmatched until now, platinum status in the U.S. and Canada, and also gold in Switzerland. As a result of this album's success, the band was invited to join the second-largest U.S. tour of the year as "special guests": The Pyromania tour of British rock band Def Leppard, who became popular in the U.S. at that time, and Gary Moore as opening act. During this time, von Rohr and his bandmates were also appointed honorary citizens of the U.S. state of Tennessee. Even though, or perhaps because of the wave of success the band enjoyed at this time, within the next few months two serious negative experiences changed the course of events once more: First, Krokus was kicked off the Pyromania tour because of several missteps by singer Marc Storace and band manager Butch Stone – the band eventually finished their North American tour as supporting act of Judas Priest – and on the other hand another wave of line-up changes. First rhythm guitarist Mark Kohler was dismissed and replaced by Patrick Mason, and finally von Rohr, the last remaining founding member of the band, was ousted because he openly talked to Switzerland's daily newspaper Blick about his experience on the road and the tour excesses that followed as well as his rebellion against the business antics of their U.S. manager Stone.

=== Forced reorientations: activities as music producer, author and solo artist (1983–1987) ===
Dismissed by Krokus at once, Chris von Rohr found himself on his own overnight. During this period, the ousted bass player and founder of the band took on diverse projects: firstly, he produced in 1985 the first and only self-titled studio album of the Swiss band Headhunter. In addition to his first official job as a producer, von Rohr also started to write his first book, which was published in 1991 and entitled Hunde wollt ihr ewig rocken (Dogs, do you want to rock forever). The book described the insane events around and within Krokus and helped him to process that entire experience mentally, thus finding closure. In addition, von Rohr released his first and so far only solo album Hammer and Tongue in 1987.

=== Brief return to Krokus (1987–1989) ===
Shortly after releasing his solo album, von Rohr returned to Krokus in 1987. Plain and simply stated, it turned out to be the best solution for all parties involved. Together again at last, von Rohr and his old bandmates Marc Storace, Fernando von Arb, Mark Kohler and Dani Crivelli, who played drums on his solo album, recorded at Jürg Naegeli's Pink recording studio in Zuchwil their tenth studio album. Produced by von Rohr and von Arb, Krokus released Heart Attack in 1988. The album charted 5th place in the Swiss albums chart, a first for von Rohr and Krokus. It was the return to Hard Rock, which had catapulted the band in the early 1980s into the worldwide spotlight and away from the shallow pop-metal orientation the band presented itself on the previous album, Change of Address. However, after touring throughout Europe and the United States, all parties realized shortly thereafter that the thrill was gone, mainly it seemed to be impossible to restore the feeling and groove of the past. Mounting management problems and both Marc Storace and Fernando von Arb throwing in the towel due to symptoms of extreme fatigue and exhaustion, marked the first official break-up in the band's history.

=== Various activities as a musician, journalist and radio host (1989–1991) ===
After the dissolution of Krokus, Chris von Rohr worked under the pseudonym J. LaCross as producer of the first studio album Metal Marathon by a band called The Heavy's. This album consisted of a collection of shortened and re-arranged classic rock and metal cover medleys. Shortly thereafter, von Rohr founded a band called Grand Slam with Peter Tanner on vocals as well as lead guitarist Many Maurer, rhythm guitarist Tony Castell and drummer Peter Haas. With this group he toured Germany, Austria and Hungary – mainly playing material from his solo album – until he left the band in late 1989. Meanwhile, von Rohr already worked as a radio moderator on the very popular "Radio 24", a regional radio station of Zurich, and "Radio 32", a regional station from Solothurn. Among others, he hosted the show Volles Rohr (Full Power). He also wrote articles for various music magazines.

=== First book bestseller and success as discoverer, coach and producer of Gotthard (1991–2002) ===
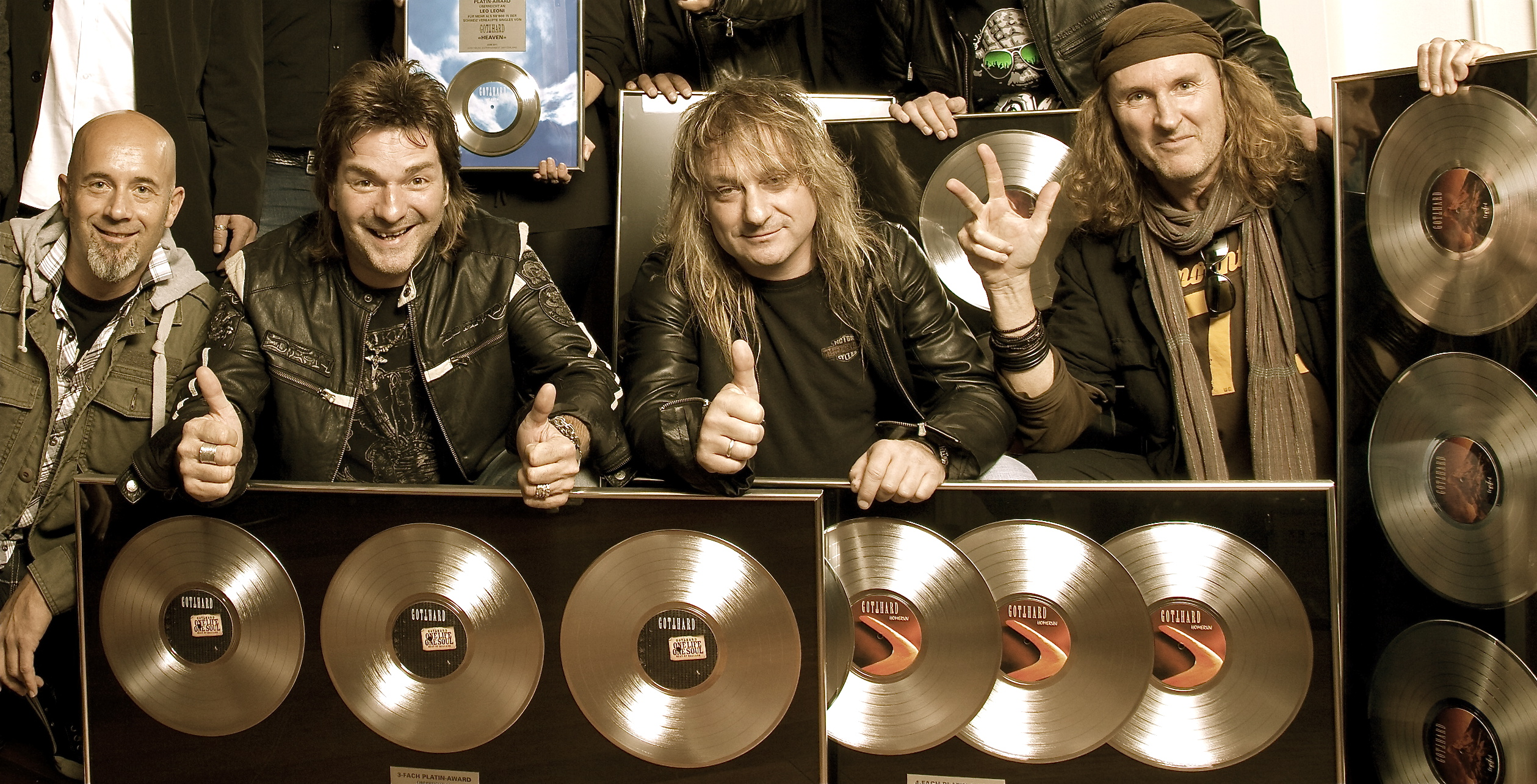
Von Rohr as producer of Gotthard

In 1991, von Rohr finally published his first book, which he started writing right after his dismissal from Krokus. An autobiography entitled Hunde wollt ihr ewig rocken (Dogs, do you wanna rock forever) that gave the reader a direct, honest and genuine insight to the childhood and youth of the musician as well as behind the scenes recollections during his rock star days with Krokus. Subsequently, the literary work, in which the author recalls the highs and lows of his career in his own words, became a cult book and bestseller not only for rock and metal fans. That same year, Chris von Rohr also started his collaboration with the Swiss hard rock band Gotthard, via their band manager Marco Antognini. This cooperation turned out to be the beginning of a success story for both sides, as already the first, released in 1992, self-titled studio album Gotthard reached a significant chart position by making it to No. 5 in the Swiss chart. A year later, besides his duties with Gotthard, von Rohr also re-released his 1987 solo album Hammer and Tongue, this time however under the title The Good, The Bad and The Dög including the bonus track "See You Walking". Following this reissue, von Rohr's focus was again entirely on Gotthard and what followed was, despite or because of persistent internal tensions – at least in Switzerland – a single musical triumph. All of the following studio and live albums of the band, produced by von Rohr, particularly Dial Hard in 1994, G. in 1996, D-Frosted in 1997 and Open in 1999 reached number 1 in the Swiss albums chart. Moreover, several singles were able to rank in the music charts of the Alpine republic of Switzerland.

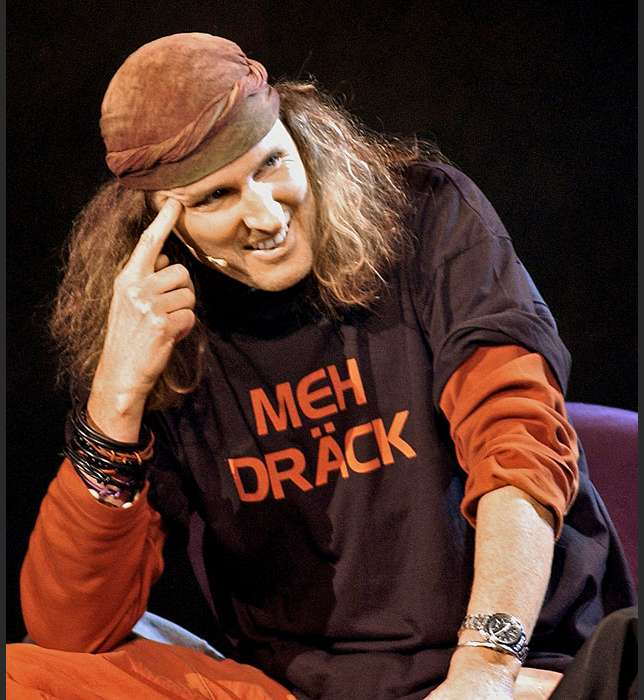
Von Rohr as juror at MusicStar

After that von Rohr participated on the ninth studio album of Polo Hofer & The Schmetterband (a Swiss dialect band) called Härzbluet, which was released in January 2000. The two songs "Es saftigs Müntschi" and "Bärner" were both co-composed and co-produced by von Rohr. Through his connections in the music biz von Rohr initiated and produced the song "Who's gonna shoe your pretty little foot", a duet by Polo Hofer with the U.S. blues musician Willy DeVille. This short detour into Swiss dialect collaborations was followed by a very significant private event of the successful musician and producer: the birth of his daughter Jewel in 2001. Nevertheless, there was no resting on his laurels – on the contrary: With the studio album Homerun in 2001, which included the number-one single "Heaven", and the compilation One Life One Soul: Best of Ballads in 2002, he produced two other releases with Gotthard, which in turn landed at number one on the Swiss albums chart. However, despite the successful joint working relationship over the last 11 years, that had its up's and down's and was not always easy for both sides, band and mentor von Rohr parted ways in 2002.

=== Second bestseller, "Meh Dräck" and varied activities (2002–2008) ===
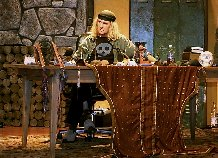
Von Rohr in his TV show Black 'n' Blond

Following the separation with Gotthard and with respect to his varied activities, a very all-around phase was about to begin. While he was working on his second book, he served as co-producer on Trybguet, the fifth studio album by Swiss dialect band Patent Ochsner, which was released in February 2003. This album jumped to number one in the Swiss albums chart. Finally, in November 2003, his second literary work Bananenflanke (the second part of his autobiography) was published and rather quickly turned out to be another best seller for von Rohr. At the same time, his first bestseller, Hunde wollt ihr ewig rocken was released as a five-CD audiobook. On top of that von Rohr started in November 2003 his TV career as a juror in the first series of the talent show MusicStar that was broadcast by Swiss TV's SF zwei.

During this time, a documentary was published in February 2004 entitled Krokus: As Long as We Live, which dealt with the turbulent history of Krokus in an informative and multi-perspective way by letting people that were part of this journey tell their story in their own way. The creation of this film ultimately initiated the reconciliation of Chris von Rohr and Fernando von Arb – and the subsequent reunion of the original line-up of Krokus. Von Rohr earned even more popularity with his slogan "Meh Dräck" during a broadcast of MusicStar, when he discouraged candidates to continue a music career due to their lackluster performance. The cult status that evolved because of his saying, convinced him eventually to write a song with the same title. This was ultimately released as a single and Meh Dräck! reached number 14 in the Swiss Singles Chart. Furthermore, «Meh Dräck» was even chosen as "word of the year 2004" in Switzerland. From December 2004 to February 2005 von Rohr appeared again as a juror in the second season of the talent show Music Star. Meanwhile, he also produced the live recorded acoustic album of the band Lovebugs, which also shot to number one in the Swiss albums chart.

After completion of the second season, von Rohr eventually left Musicstar to get back to work as a radio moderator. The broadcast VollRohr – Rock'n'Talk (full power ahead – Rock'n'Talk) was heard from May 2005 to June 2006 on various radio stations in Switzerland. Alternating with Peter Bichsel, Peter Scholl-Latour and Helmut Hubacher, von Rohr started in 2005 also to write each month's column Notabene for the magazine Schweizer Illustrierte. Meanwhile, he additionally started in October 2005 together with Roman Kilchsperger on SF two a late-night TV show called Black'n'Blond. Here, at the first broadcast of the show, von Rohr got the attention of the Swiss television viewers my mooning the camera. However, the producers of the Schweizer Fernsehen (Swiss television) show were not convinced about the sustainability in the long run and Black'n'Blond was incidentally cancelled in September 2006. But von Rohr's absence on TV was short-lived, as he could be seen from October to December 2006 as a juror in the uniquely produced talent show Superstar, which was broadcast on Swiss TV channel 3+.

In December 2007 – despite Marc Storace still touring with the then active line-up of Krokus – an increased movement to revive the classic line-up of Krokus started when the Storace, von Arb, von Rohr and Steady performed in the Swiss TV show Die grössten Schweizer Hits (The Greatest Swiss Hits of All Time). After their performance and a standing ovation, the original members of the band were presented with the Diamond Award for over a million records sold in Switzerland. After that event, an artistic pause was announced on the band's own website.

=== Return of original Krokus line-up and third bestseller (2008–present) ===
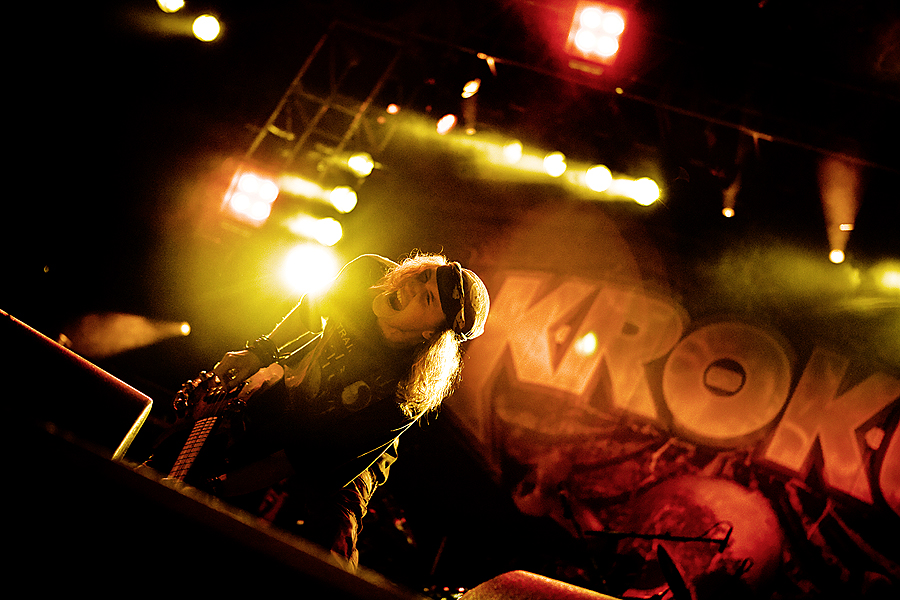
Von Rohr at Stade de Suisse in Bern 2008

Following the artistic pause, Krokus re-formed in the same line-up that at the end of 2007 performed in the TV show Die grössten Schweizer Hits, i.e. frontman Storace, guitarist von Arb, bassist von Rohr and drummer Steady. Shortly thereafter, the return of rhythm guitarist Mark Kohler was announced, and the original line-up that recorded the 1982 album One Vice at a Time was reunited at last. Subsequently, the original Krokus line-up performed their much acclaimed reunion concert at the Stade de Suisse football stadium in Bern; then the band contributed the anthem for the Hockey World Cup, that was held in 2009 in Switzerland, called "Live for the Action". Next started the work on Krokus' 16th studio album called Hoodoo, which was recorded mostly at the House of Audio in Winterbach and von Rohr himself is credited as the producer of the album, which was released in February 2010. It was the second time only in the history of Krokus that the album debuted at number one on the Swiss albums chart and ultimately earned the band platinum status in their home country. Following the release of the album, the band played numerous large festivals and a few headlining shows in Europe until late December 2010. Simultaneously von Rohr found himself again in front of a TV audience as of July 2010, hired as a profiler of 3sat and their broadcast Tonspur – Der Soundtrack meines Lebens (Soundtrack – The soundtrack of my life).

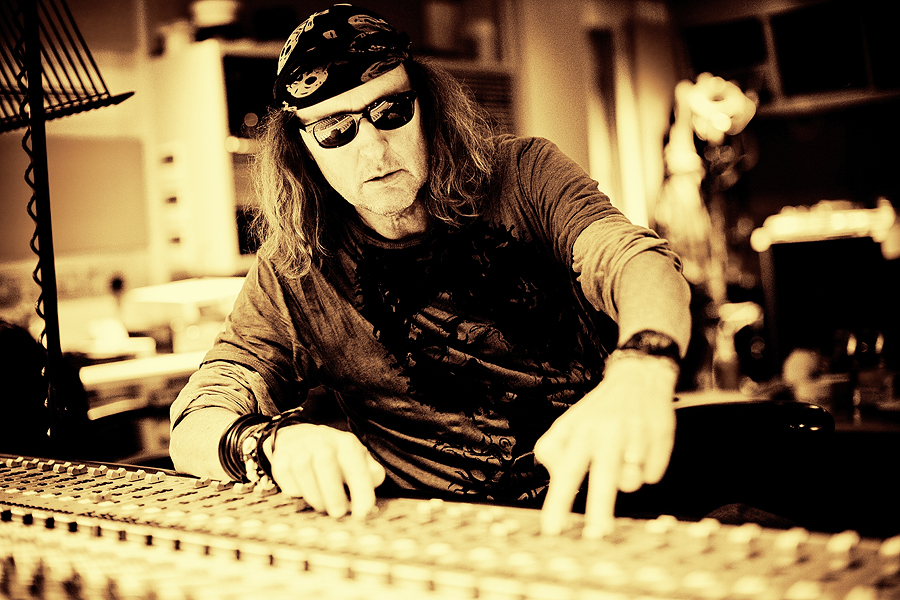
Von Rohr at the Abbey Road Studios 2012

Before the preparations on a new album of Krokus could take place, Chris von Rohr published his third book Sternenstaub (Stardust) in October 2011, which includes some of the columns he had written over the years for the renowned magazine "Schweizer Illustrierte". The literary work of the multi-talented, most successful rock musician and producer in all of Switzerland jumped to No. 9 of the Swiss Fiction Book Chart and therefore established itself as a bestseller, like his two autobiographies Hunde wollt ihr ewig rocken (Dogs, do you want to rock forever) and Bananenflanke. After von Rohr finished work on 2012 as executive producer of the debut album of Swiss hard rock band Fox, he started recordings of Krokus' seventeenth studio album in the famous Abbey Road Studios in London in the fall of 2012. Again, von Rohr is also credited as producer of Dirty Dynamite, which finally was released in February 2013. Mandy Meyer, who in the meantime had joined the band permanently (again) as third guitarist, was part of the recording of this album. Like his predecessor Hoodoo, it shot straight to No. 1 in the Swiss albums chart before earning platinum award status in the Alpine republic of their home country, Switzerland. Krokus followed up with some headlining concerts in Switzerland, during which Flavio Mezzodi was introduced as the band's new regular drummer. In the summer of 2013 the band appeared at several festivals throughout Europe.

In January 2014, 35 years after the release of Metal Rendez-Vous, Krokus receive from their record company a 4× Platinum Award. The album, which sold around 3 million copies worldwide and is considered the most successful hard rock album of Switzerland, was co-produced by von Rohr. Last year's 4th sold-out show at the Kofmehl, a.k.a. "The House Of Rust" in their hometown of Solothurn was recorded and the live album, produced by von Rohr, would be released in April/May 2014 in 45 countries around the world as Long Stick Goes Boom: Live From Da House Of Rust. Immediately after release it shot to No. 3 in the Swiss albums chart. This was the first live album of Krokus that von Rohr played on. Starting out the 2014 concert season, the band embarks on a German tour, followed by multiple festivals all over Europe.

== Discography as musician ==
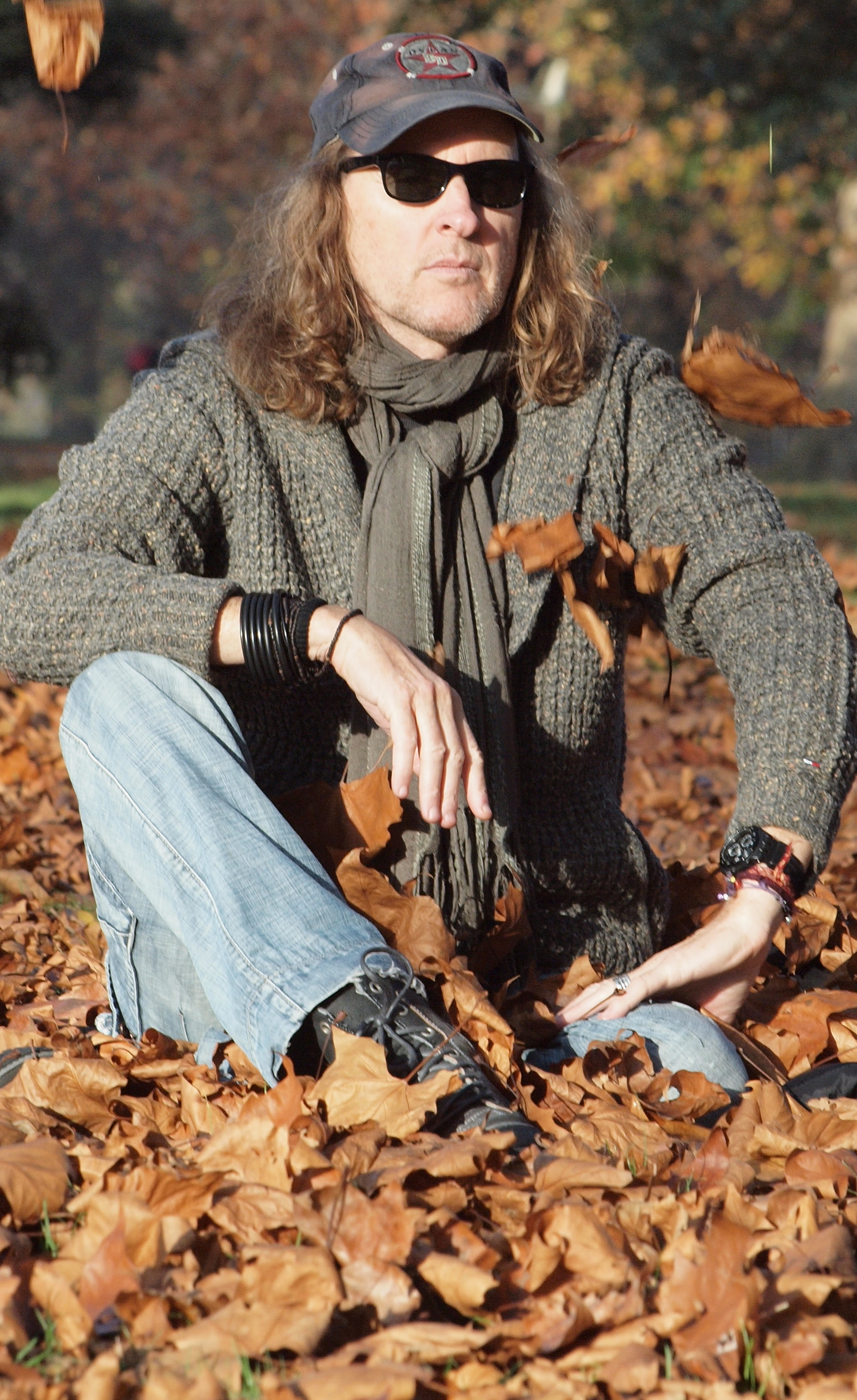
Chris von Rohr in London in autumn 2012

=== Krokus ===
Studio albums

- 1976: Krokus
- 1977: To You All
- 1978: Pain Killer/Pay It in Metal
- 1980: Metal Rendez-vous
- 1981: Hardware
- 1982: One Vice at a Time
- 1983: Headhunter
- 1988: Heart Attack
- 2010: Hoodoo
- 2013: Dirty Dynamite

Live albums

- 2014: Long Stick Goes Boom: Live From Da House Of Rust

EPs

- 1981: Industrial Strength EP

Singles

- 1977: "Highway Song"
- 1978: "Susie"
- 1979: "Bedside Radio"
- 1979: "Tokyo Nights"
- 1980: "Heatstrokes"
- 1981: "Rock City"
- 1981: "Winning Man"
- 1981: "Smelly Nelly"
- 1982: "American Woman"
- 1982: "Bad Boys, Rag Dolls"
- 1982: "Long Stick Goes Boom"
- 1983: "Screaming in the Night"
- 1983: "Stayed Awake All Night"
- 1983: "Eat the Rich"
- 1988: "Everybody Rocks"
- 1988: "Let It Go"
- 1988: "Wild Love"
- 2010: "Hoodoo Woman"
- 2010: "Too Hot"
- 2013: "Dirty Dynamite"
- 2013: "Go Baby Go"
- 2013: "Dög Song"

=== Chris von Rohr ===
Studio albums

- 1987: Hammer and Tongue (1993 re-released as The Good, the Bad and the Dög)

Singles

- 2004: "Meh Dräck!"

== Discography as producer ==
=== Krokus ===
Studio albums

- 1976: Krokus
- 1978: Pain Killer/Pay It in Metal (co-produced with Fernando von Arb)
- 1980: Metal Rendez-Vous (co-produced with Martin Pearson and Fernando von Arb)
- 1981: Hardware (co-produced with Fernando von Arb)
- 1982: One Vice at a Time (co-produced with Tony Platt and Fernando von Arb)
- 1983: Headhunter
- 1988: Heart Attack (co-produced with Fernando von Arb)
- 2010: Hoodoo
- 2013: Dirty Dynamite

Live albums

- 2014: Long Stick Goes Boom: Live From Da House Of Rust

EPs

- 1981: Industrial Strength EP (co-produced with Martin Pearson and Fernando von Arb)

Singles

- 1978: "Susie" (co-produced with Fernando von Arb)
- 1979: "Bedside Radio" (co-produced with Martin Pearson and Fernando von Arb)
- 1979: "Tokyo Nights" (co-produced with Martin Pearson and Fernando von Arb)
- 1980: "Heatstrokes" (co-produced with Martin Pearson and Fernando von Arb)
- 1981: "Rock City" (co-produced with Fernando von Arb)
- 1981: "Winning Man" (co-produced with Fernando von Arb)
- 1981: "Smelly Nelly" (co-produced with Fernando von Arb)
- 1982: "American Woman" (co-produced with Tony Platt and Fernando von Arb)
- 1982: "Bad Boys, Rag Dolls" (co-produced with Tony Platt and Fernando von Arb)
- 1982: "Long Stick Goes Boom" (co-produced with Tony Platt and Fernando von Arb)
- 1988: "Everybody Rocks" (co-produced with Fernando von Arb)
- 1988: "Let It Go" (co-produced with Fernando von Arb)
- 1988: "Wild Love" (co-produced with Fernando von Arb)
- 2010: "Hoodoo Woman"
- 2010: "Too Hot"
- 2013: "Dirty Dynamite"
- 2013: "Go Baby Go"
- 2013: "Dög Song"

=== Steve Whitney Band ===
- 1982: Night Fighting

=== Headhunter ===
- 1985: Headhunter

=== Chris von Rohr ===
Studio albums

- 1987: Hammer and Tongue (1993 re-released as The Good, the Bad and the Dög)

Singles

- 2004: "Meh Dräck!"

=== The Heavy's (under the pseudonym J. LaCross) ===
Studio albums

- 1989: Metal Marathon

Compilations

- 2008: Mega Metal Marathon

Singles

- 1989: "Metal Marathon"

=== Gotthard ===
Studio albums

- 1992: Gotthard
- 1994: Dial Hard
- 1996: G.
- 1999: Open
- 2001: Homerun

Live albums

- 1997: D-Frosted

Compilations

- 2002: One Life One Soul: Best of Ballads

Singles

- 1992: "All I Care For"
- 1992: "Hush"
- 1992: "Firedance"
- 1993: "Mountain Mama"
- 1994: "I'm on My Way"
- 1994: "Travellin' Man"
- 1995: "Father Is That Enough"
- 1996: "One Life, One Soul"
- 1996: "He Ain't Heavy, He's My Brother"
- 1997: "One Life, One Soul" (Live) (Split-Single with Montserrat Caballé)
- 1997: "Fight for Your Life"
- 1997: "Love Soul Matter"
- 1997: "Someday"
- 1998: "Let It Rain"
- 1999: "Blackberry Way"
- 1999: "Merry X-Mas"
- 1999: "You"
- 2000: "Heaven"
- 2001: "Homerun"

=== Blue Cold Ice Creams ===
- 2007: The Blue Cold Ice Creams
- 2008: Funky Town
- 2010: We Love Rock'N'Roll
- 2012: Sweet Moonshine

=== Polo Hofer and The SchmetterBand ===
- 2000: Härzbluet (co-produced with Polo Hofer, Eric Merz, Hans-Peter Brüggemann, Martin Diem and Remo Kessler)

=== Patent Ochsner ===
Studio albums

- 2003: Trybguet (co-produced with Patent Ochnser)

Singles

- 2002: "Brandstifter" (co-produced with Patent Ochnser)
- 2002: "Trybguet" (co-produced with Patent Ochnser)

=== Lovebugs ===
- 2005: Naked

=== Fox ===
- 2012 (co-produced with Mark Fox)

== Books ==
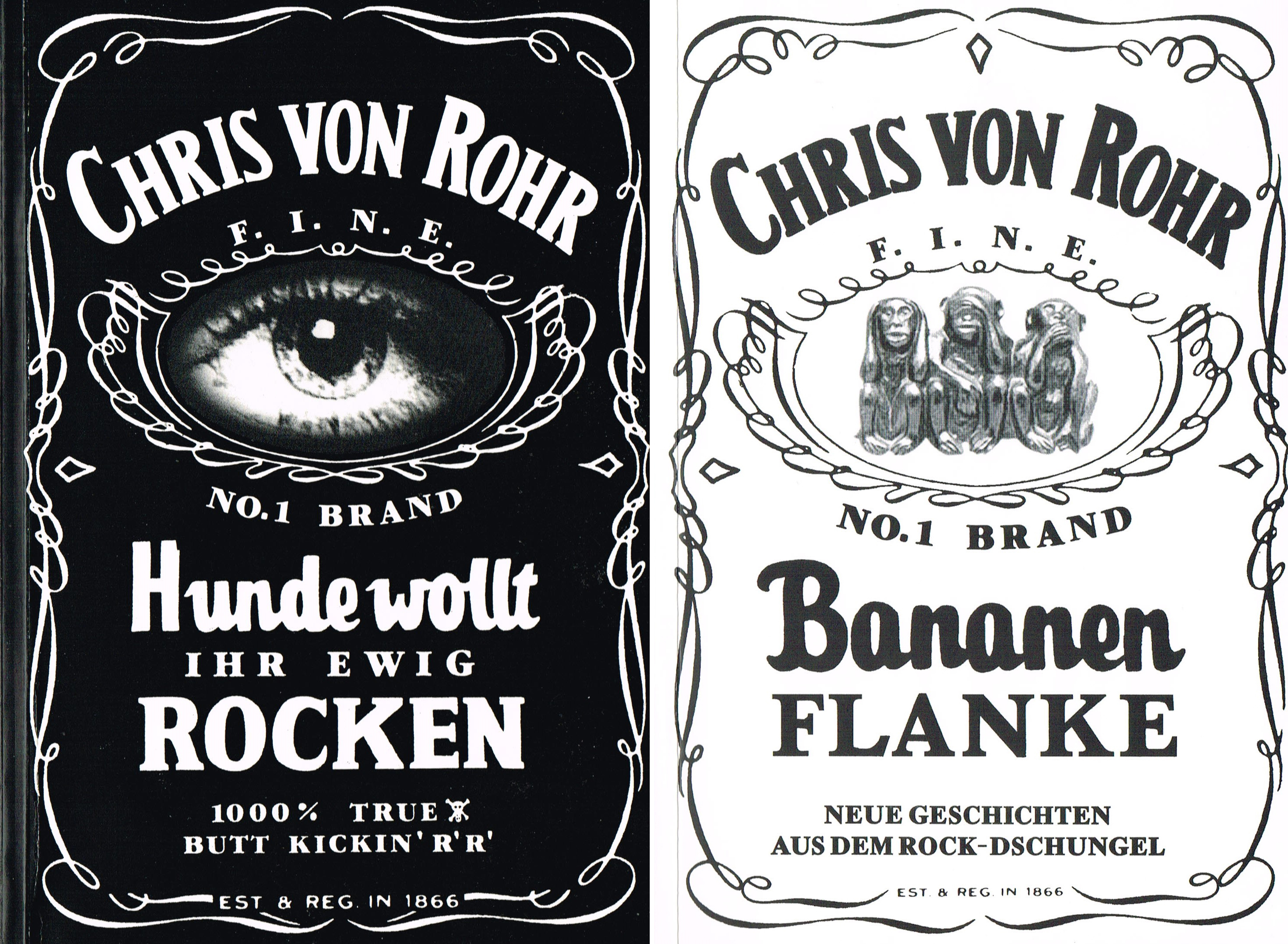
Von Rohr's autobiographies: Hunde wollt ihr ewig rocken (1991) and Bananenflanke (2003)

- Chris von Rohr: Hunde wollt ihr ewig rocken. Mein Trip durch den Rockdschungel, Steinblatt-Verlag, Lugano 1991 (also released as 5-CD audiobook).
- Chris von Rohr: Bananenflanke. Neue Geschichten aus dem Rock-Dschungel, Steinblatt-Verlag, Biel 2003.
- Chris von Rohr: Sternenstaub. Die besten Kolumnen. Giger Verlag, Altendorf 2011.
