= Dirty Dynamite =

Studio album by Krokus
- Released: 5 March 2013
- Recorded: Abbey Road Studios, London; Powerplay Studios, Zurich, Montekristo Studios and Wicked Wench Studios, Solothurn, Switzerland
- Genre: Hard rock
- Length: 45:22
- Label: The End
- Producer: Chris von Rohr

Krokus chronology
Hoodoo (2010)	Dirty Dynamite (2013)	Big Rocks (2017)

Professional ratings
Review scores
Source	Rating
Allmusic	3.5/5 stars
PopMatters	6/10 stars

Dirty Dynamite is the seventeenth studio album from Swiss melodic hard rock band Krokus, released through The End Records in North America. It includes a cover of the Beatles song "Help!".

== Reception ==
Since its release, the album has been met with mostly positive reviews from critics. William Clark of Music Enthusiast Magazine described the album as "an album of 12 rampaging rock songs that sounds just as good if not better than anything they released back in the day".

== Track listing ==
All songs by von Rohr, von Arb, Storace, except where indicated

1. "Hallelujah Rock n' Roll" (von Rohr, Kohler, Storace) – 3:27
2. "Go Baby Go" – 3:38
3. "Rattlesnake Rumble" – 3:49
4. "Dirty Dynamite" – 3:51
5. "Let the Good Times Roll" (von Rohr, Kohler, Storace) – 3:55
6. "Help" (Lennon–McCartney) – 4:27
7. "Better Than Sex" – 4:17
8. "Dög Song" – 3:48
9. "Yellow Mary" – 3:32
10. "Bailout Blues" (von Rohr, Kohler, Storace) – 3:30
11. "Live Ma Life" (von Rohr, Kohler, Storace) – 3:58
12. "Hardrocking Man" – 3:10

== Personnel ==
Band members

- Marc Storace – lead vocals
- Fernando von Arb – piano, lead guitar, rhythm guitar, bass, backing vocals
- Mark Kohler – rhythm guitar, bass, engineer
- Mandy Meyer – lead guitar
- Chris von Rohr – bass, piano, drums, percussion, backing vocals, producer, engineer
- Kosta Zafiriou – drums, percussion

Guests

- Mark Fox – vocals, engineer
- Tommy Heart – vocals

Production

- Dennis Ward – engineer, mixing
- Helge van Dyk – engineer
- Darcy Proper – mastering at Wisseloord Studios

== Charts ==
=== Weekly charts ===
Chart (2013)	Peak position
Austrian Albums (Ö3 Austria)	46
German Albums (Offizielle Top 100)	17
Swedish Albums (Sverigetopplistan)	41
Swiss Albums (Schweizer Hitparade)	1

=== Year-end charts ===
Chart (2013)	Position
Swiss Albums (Schweizer Hitparade)	13

== Certifications ==
Region	Certification	Certified units/sales
Switzerland (IFPI Switzerland)	Platinum	20,000^{^}
^{^} Shipments figures based on certification alone.
