= Hardware (Krokus album) =

Studio album by Krokus
- Released: 18 February 1981
- Recorded: November–December 1980
- Studio: Roundhouse Studios, London
- Genre: Hard rock, heavy metal
- Length: 37:33
- Label: Ariola
- Producer: Krokus

Krokus chronology
Metal Rendez-vous (1980)	Hardware (1981)	One Vice at a Time (1982)

Singles from Hardware
- 1. "Rock City" Released: February 1981 (UK); 2. "Winning Man" Released: April 1981 (US); 3. "Smelly Nelly" Released: 1981 (Germany)

Professional ratings
Review scores
Source	Rating
AllMusic	1.5/5 stars
Collector's Guide to Heavy Metal	6/10

Hardware is the fifth studio album by the Swiss hard rock band Krokus. It did not match the success of their previous album, Metal Rendez-vous, going only Gold in Switzerland. However, the album entered the charts in the US, UK and other European countries.

The 1981 exploitation film Mad Foxes features the songs "Easy Rocker" and "Celebration".

UK-based company Rock Candy Records reissued the album on CD in 2014.

== Track listing ==
All songs by Fernando von Arb and Chris von Rohr, except where indicated

Side one

1. "Celebration" – 3:23
2. "Easy Rocker" – 5:28
3. "Smelly Nelly" (Tommy Kiefer, von Arb, von Rohr) – 3:42
4. "Mr. 69" – 3:02
5. "She's Got Everything" – 3:58

Side two

1. "Burning Bones" (von Arb, von Rohr, Marc Storace) – 3:37
2. "Rock City" – 4:47
3. "Winning Man" – 5:34
4. "Mad Racket" – 4:02

== Personnel ==
Krokus

- Marc Storace – lead vocals
- Fernando von Arb – rhythm guitar, keyboards, bass, backing vocals
- Tommy Kiefer – lead guitar, backing vocals
- Chris von Rohr – bass, drums, backing vocals, percussion, keyboards
- Freddy Steady – drums, percussion, backing vocals
- Jürg Naegeli – keyboards, bass, backing vocals

Production

- Mark Dearnley, Nick Rogers – engineers
- Ian Cooper – mastering at The Townhouse, London

== Charts ==
=== Album ===
Chart (1981)	Peak position
Austrian Albums (Ö3 Austria)	16
German Albums (Offizielle Top 100)	56
Swedish Albums (Sverigetopplistan)	50
UK Albums (OCC)	44
Billboard 200 (USA)	103

=== Singles ===
Year	Title	Chart	Position
1981	"Burning Bones"	Hot Mainstream Rock Tracks (USA)	46
1981	"Winning Man"	Hot Mainstream Rock Tracks (USA)	26
