= Metal Rendez-vous =

Studio album by Krokus
- Released: 30 June 1980
- Recorded: October–November 1979
- Studio: Studio Platinum One, Oberehrendingen, Switzerland
- Genre: Hard rock, heavy metal
- Length: 43:39
- Label: Ariola
- Producer: Martin Pearson and Krokus

Krokus chronology
| Painkiller (1978) | Metal Rendez-vous (1980) | Hardware (1981) |

Singles from Metal Rendez-vous
- 1. "Bedside Radio" Released: March 1980 (UK); 2. "Heatstrokes" Released: May 1980 (UK); 3. "Tokyo Nights" Released: August 1980 (UK)

Professional ratings
Review scores
| Source | Rating |
|---|---|
| AllMusic | 2.5/5 stars |
| Collector's Guide to Heavy Metal | 6/10 |
| Record Mirror | 4/5 stars |

Metal Rendez-vous is the fourth studio album by the Swiss hard rock band Krokus, released in June 1980. It is the first Krokus release to feature vocalist Marc Storace; Chris von Rohr had formerly served as the band's lead vocalist but appears on Metal Rendez-vous as the band's bassist. The track "Heatstrokes" charted number one in the British Heavy Metal Charts, and arguably opened up markets for Krokus in Britain and the United States, along with "Bedside Radio" and "Tokyo Nights". Strangely, the song "Tokyo Nights" features a reggae beat halfway through. The album sold more than 150,000 copies in Switzerland and was certified Triple Platinum.

Seven of the songs on Metal Rendez-vous – "Heatstrokes", "Bedside Radio", "Streamer", "Shy Kid", "Tokyo Nights", "Lady Double Dealer", and "Fire" – along with an eighth song, titled "Sweet Inspiration", were originally demoed with singer Henry Fries who fronted the band for a period in 1978/'79 before being replaced by Storace. The Fries demos are available digitally on iTunes under the name Henry Fries & Friends. In 1982, Fries and fellow Krokus alumni, Jürg Naegeli and Tommy Kiefer, would release the album Downtown Cocktail under the name Henry Freis & The Cityleaders.

UK-based company Rock Candy Records reissued Metal Rendez-vous on CD in 2014.

== Track listing ==
All songs written by Fernando von Arb and Chris von Rohr, except "Bedside Radio", "Shy Kid", "Tokyo Nights" and "Back-Seat Rock 'n' Roll" by von Arb, von Rohr and Jürg Naegeli.

Side one

1. "Heatstrokes" – 4:00
2. "Bedside Radio" – 3:22
3. "Come On" – 4:29
4. "Streamer" – 6:44
5. "Shy Kid" – 2:33

Side two

6. "Tokyo Nights" – 5:54
7. "Lady Double Dealer" – 3:13
8. "Fire" – 6:07
9. "No Way" – 4:02
10. "Back-Seat Rock 'n' Roll" – 3:15

(A re-recording of "Back-Seat Rock n' Roll" appears on the band's 2017 covers album Big Rocks).

== Personnel ==
Krokus

- Marc Storace – lead vocals
- Fernando von Arb – rhythm guitar, keyboards, bass, backing vocals
- Tommy Kiefer – lead guitar, backing vocals
- Chris von Rohr – bass, backing vocals, percussion, drums, keyboards
- Freddy Steady – drums, percussion, backing vocals
- Jürg Naegeli – keyboards, bass, backing vocals, assistant engineer

Production

- Martin Pearson – producer, engineer
- Ursli Weber – assistant engineer

== Certifications ==
| Region | Certification | Certified units/sales |
|---|---|---|
| Switzerland (IFPI Switzerland) | 4× Platinum | 200,000^{^} |
^{^} Shipments figures based on certification alone.
