= Hoodoo (Krokus album) =

Studio album by Krokus
- Released: 26 February 2010
- Recorded: House of Audio, Winterbach, Germany; Pink Bild+Ton, Solothurn, Switzerland; Henson Studios, Los Angeles
- Genre: Hard rock, heavy metal
- Length: 42:48
- Label: Columbia/Sony
- Producer: Chris von Rohr

Krokus chronology
Hellraiser (2006)	Hoodoo (2010)	Dirty Dynamite (2013)

Professional ratings
Review scores
Source	Rating
Allmusic	3.5/5 stars
About.com	3.5/5 stars
PopMatters	5/10 stars
Metal Underground	3/5 stars
Rock Hard	8.0/10 stars

Hoodoo is the sixteenth studio album by the Swiss hard rock/heavy metal band Krokus. It includes a cover of the Steppenwolf song "Born to be Wild". The album failed to reach the Billboard Top 200 in the U.S., unlike their last album (Hellraiser), but the release was successful overseas. The song "Hoodoo Woman" is featured on the soundtrack of the movie Saw 3D.

The album has received mixed to positive reviews from publications such as About.com and Allmusic. Critic Chad Bower of About.com labeled the release as being "packed with big hooks arena ready anthems". Critic Alexey Eremenko praised the album for Allmusic as having the band "rocking as hard as ever", with "dirty, swaggering" hard rock songs.

Hoodoo was certified Platinum in Switzerland.

== Track listing ==
All tracks are written by Fernando von Arb, Chris von Rohr and Marc Storace, except where indicated.

No.	Title	Writer(s)	Length
1.	"Drive It In"		3:32
2.	"Hoodoo Woman"	von Arb, von Rohr, Storace, Hanno Pinter, Alexander Zoppel	3:37
3.	"Born to Be Wild" (Steppenwolf cover)	Mars Bonfire	3:34
4.	"Rock 'n' Roll Handshake"		3:56
5.	"Ride into the Sun"	von Arb, von Rohr, Storace, Mark Kohler	5:02
6.	"Too Hot"		3:45
7.	"In My Blood"		3:32
8.	"Dirty Street"		4:26
9.	"Keep Me Rolling"		4:11
10.	"Shot of Love"		3:31
11.	"Firestar"		3:42

== Personnel ==
Band members

- Marc Storace – lead vocals
- Fernando von Arb – lead and rhythm guitar, piano, bass, backing vocals
- Mark Kohler – rhythm and lead guitar, bass
- Chris von Rohr – bass, piano, drums, percussion, backing vocals, producer
- Freddy Steady – drums, percussion

Additional musicians

- Mark Fox – vocals
- Kenny Aronoff – drums

Production

- Dennis Ward – engineer, mixing
- Jürg Neageli, Steve Churchyard – additional engineering
- Ted Jensen – mastering at Sterling Sound, New York City

== Charts ==
Chart (2010)	Peak position
European Top 100 Albums	99
French Albums (SNEP)	198
German Albums (Offizielle Top 100)	33
Greek Albums (IFPI)	6
Swiss Albums (Schweizer Hitparade)	1

== Certifications ==
Region	Certification	Certified units/sales
Switzerland (IFPI Switzerland)	Platinum	30,000^{^}
^{^} Shipments figures based on certification alone.
