= One Vice at a Time =

Studio album by Krokus
- Released: February 1982 (UK); 17 March 1982 (US)
- Recorded: 1981
- Studio: Battery (London)
- Genres: Hard rock, heavy metal
- Length: 36:14
- Label: Arista
- Producers: Tony Platt, Krokus

Krokus chronology
Hardware (1981)	One Vice at a Time (1982)	Headhunter (1983)

Singles from One Vice at a Time
- 1. "Bad Boys Rag Dolls" Released: February 1982 (UK); 2. "Long Stick Goes Boom" Released: June 1982 (US); 3. "American Woman" Released: July 1982 (UK)

Professional ratings
Review scores
Source	Rating
AllMusic	3/5 stars
Collector's Guide to Heavy Metal	9/10
Record Mirror	1/5 stars

One Vice at a Time is the sixth studio album by the Swiss hard rock band Krokus, released in 1982 by Arista Records. It is notable for the strong influence of AC/DC on the songs and production, and was the first album to feature Mark Kohler on rhythm guitar. It includes a cover of the Guess Who's song "American Woman". The song "Long Stick Goes Boom" is used in the video game Grand Theft Auto: Vice City Stories on the fictional in-game radio station V-Rock.

Bruce Dickinson, who at the time had just been hired as Iron Maiden's new lead vocalist, provides backing vocals on the track "I'm on the Run". Producer Tony Platt was best known for his prior work as engineer with AC/DC.

The band's live album Long Stick Goes Boom: Live from da House of Rust took its title from the lead-off song on this release.

UK-based company Rock Candy Records reissued One Vice at a Time on CD in 2014.

== Reception ==
At the time of release British press has negatively commented on the musical content of the album, condemning the musicians as copycats of AC/DC. Reviewer Dante Bonutto from Kerrang! magazine wrote in March 1982: "Krokus's infatuation with AC/DC seems to rule out even a hint of progress. On the evidence One Vice at a Time (and it's true of previous albums, also) the band are less concerned with creating something new than aping a tried, tested and successful formula. With the help of producer Tony Platt, who engineered on Highway to Hell and Back in Black, Krokus create passable facsimile of Angus and Co's distinctively-layered sound. The motivations behind the music and that all-important AC/DC swagger, however, can't be reproduced, a fact that leaves the album sounding two-dimensional and soulless. Music by numbers (largely) predictable and uninspired".

== Track listing ==
Side one

1. "Long Stick Goes Boom" (Chris von Rohr, Fernando von Arb, Marc Storace) – 5:12
2. "Bad Boys, Rag Dolls" (von Rohr, von Arb, Storace) – 3:48
3. "Playin' the Outlaw" (von Rohr, von Arb, Freddy Steady, Storace) – 4:00
4. "To the Top" (von Rohr, von Arb, Storace) – 4:21

Side two

5. "Down the Drain" (von Rohr, von Arb) – 3:12
6. "American Woman" (Burton Cummings, Gary Peterson, Michael James Kale, Randy Bachman) – 3:37 (The Guess Who cover)
7. "I'm on the Run" (von Rohr, von Arb, Storace) – 3:43
8. "Save Me" (von Rohr, von Arb, Steady, Storace) – 4:27
9. "Rock 'n' Roll" (von Rohr, von Arb) – 4:07

== Personnel ==
Krokus

- Marc Storace – vocals
- Fernando von Arb – lead guitar
- Mark Kohler – rhythm guitar
- Chris von Rohr – bass, percussion
- Freddy Steady – drums

Additional musicians

- Bruce Dickinson – backing vocals on "I'm on the Run"

Production

- Co-produced by Tony Platt and Krokus
- Engineered by Tony Platt
- Barry Sage – assistant engineer
- Chris von Rohr, Fernando von Arb – arrangements

== Charts ==
=== Album ===
Chart (1982)	Peak position
Dutch Albums (Album Top 100)	43
German Albums (Offizielle Top 100)	38
Swedish Albums (Sverigetopplistan)	36
UK Albums (Official Charts)	28
Billboard 200 (USA)	53

=== Singles ===
Year	Title	Chart	Position
1982	"American Woman"	Mainstream Rock (chart)Mainstream Rock Tracks (USA)	53
1982	"Long Stick Goes Boom"	Mainstream Rock (chart)Mainstream Rock Tracks (USA)	22

== Sales and certifications ==
Region	Certification	Certified units/sales
Switzerland (IFPI Switzerland)	Gold	25,000^{^}
United States	—	100,000
^{^} Shipments figures based on certification alone.
