= Krokus (album) =

Studio album by Krokus
- Released: 29 April 1976
- Recorded: November to December 1975
- Studios: Sinus Studio, Bern
- Genres: Hard rock; progressive rock
- Length: 35:46
- Label: Schnoutz Records
- Producers: Krokus, Peter J. Mac Taggart

Krokus chronology
Krokus (1976)	To You All (1977)

Professional ratings
Review scores
Source	Rating
Allmusic	1/5 stars

Krokus (also known, by the band in particular, as First Album) is the debut album by Swiss rock band Krokus. It was the only Krokus album to feature Hansi Droz and Remo Spadino. It is also the only Krokus album to show a progressive rock style. The album has become a collector's item since only 560 copies were ever pressed and it has never been made available since.

== Track listing ==
Side A
No.	Title	Writer(s)	Length
1.	"Majale"	Tommy Kiefer	2:56
2.	"Angela Part One"	Chris von Rohr, Kiefer, Hansi Droz, Remo Spadino	3:00
3.	"Energy"	Kiefer	5:04
4.	"Mostsaphin" (Instrumental)	Kiefer	3:05
5.	"No Way"	Kiefer	2:39
6.	"Eventide Clockworks" (Instrumental)	von Rohr	1:10

Side B
No.	Title	Writer(s)	Length
7.	"Freak Dream"	Peter Richard, Kiefer, Droz	3:35
8.	"Jumpin' In"	Richard, Droz	2:32
9.	"Insalata Mysta"	Kiefer, Droz, Spadino	7:04
10.	"Angela Part Two"	von Rohr, Kieger, Droz, Spadino	1:37
11.	"Just Like Every Day"	Richard	3:03

== Personnel ==
- Tommy Kiefer – lead and backing vocals, lead guitar
- Hansi Droz – rhythm guitar
- Remo Spadino – bass
- Chris von Rohr – drums, backing and lead vocals, piano, percussion

Additional musicians

- Rebo (Ribo B. Boulding) – congas (tracks 2, 8, 10)
- Peter Richard – lead vocals (Track 7, 8, 11)
- Eric Mertz – emotional vocals (track 9)
