= Marc Storace =

Swiss rock singer (born 1951)

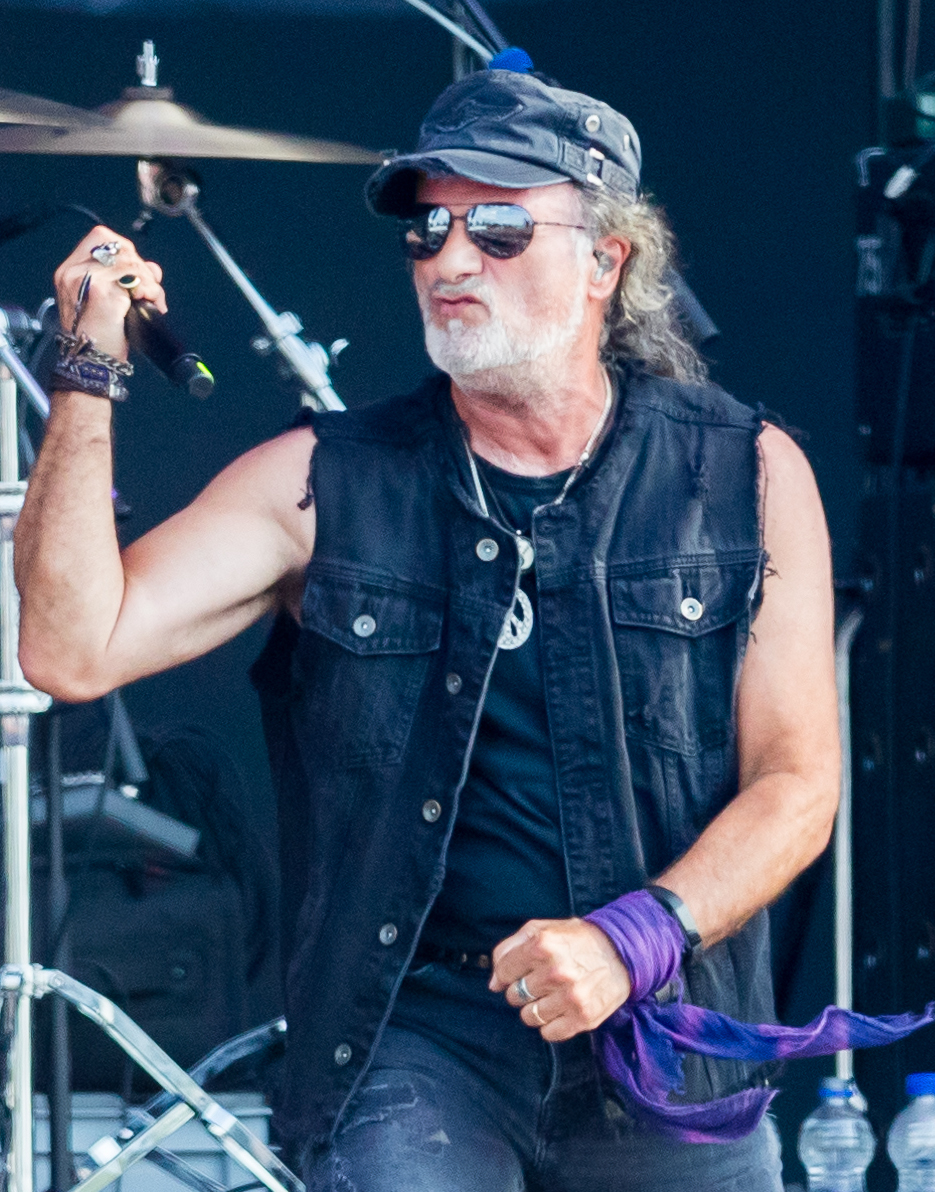
- Storace with Krokus in 2019

Background information
- Born: 7 October 1951 (age 74); Sliema, Malta
- Genres: Hard rock; heavy metal
- Occupations: Singer; songwriter
- Years active: 1965–present
- Member of: Krokus
- Formerly of: TEA
- Website: facebook.com/marcstorace

Marc Storace (Italian: [stoˈraːtʃe]; born 7 October 1951) is a Maltese-born Swiss singer. His career in music started in the 1960s. He is most noted for his position as the lead singer and songwriter of the Swiss hard rock band Krokus from 1980. Before joining Krokus, he sang with the Swiss progressive rock band TEA. He has also since undertaken a solo project, duets, an acoustical project, and many guest slots. He also had some close encounters with the classical meets rock world and has worked with a few other rock acts as writer and a singer.

Storace has a high-pitched raunchy voice, which has been compared to AC/DC's former lead singer Bon Scott and Led Zeppelin's Robert Plant. Since he began singing professionally in the 1970s, his style and voice have remained largely the same, with a noticeable increase of character, through maturity and years of live and studio experience.

He played a major role in the Swiss-German films Anuk and Handyman, in which he acted, as well as contributed his writing and singing to songs for both the film's soundtracks.

As of January 2019, Storace was still active in rock projects as well as his "ongoing" semi-acoustic one. Krokus embarked on their "Farewell Tour" that April.

== Early life ==
Born as Mark Anthony Storace Crockford, one of six children to Anthony Storace and Edna Crockford on the Mediterranean island of Malta, Storace taught himself to sing at a fairly young age. His life in bands began at the age of fourteen (1965) when he made his first live performances with two local bands: Stonehenge Union (who covered the likes of the Beatles, the Rolling Stones, the Troggs and the Kinks) and: The Boys (who covered some of the same songs, as well as newer chart material containing more vocally challenging songs e.g. Aquarius from the Musical "HAIR"). Inspired by the gigantic WOODSTOCK Festival in the late 1960s, Storace renamed The Boys to Cinnamon Hades. Whilst retaining the popular Beatles "Abbey Road Medley" the band started to cover Iron Butterfly, Jimi Hendrix, and Hard Rock acts such as The Who, Deep Purple, Led Zeppelin and Black Sabbath.

Wanting to follow his dream of making a career as a rock musician, Storace was forced to leave his island home. He moved to London in 1970.

Further on in his career, after joining Krokus, many people who heard Storace sing thought that he sounded like Bon Scott of AC/DC. He did not take this as a compliment at the time, saying that, with all respect to Bon, he had his own singing identity (proof of this is on ballads and other songs he recorded with TEA & KROKUS) Storace was later approached (by a production company used by both AC/DC and KROKUS at the time) to audition for the frontman job with AC/DC after Scott's death, but Krokus was enjoying a fast increase in success whilst, at that point in time, AC/DC was not that huge, so Storace preferred to stay with his new bandmates.

== Early career ==
At the end of 1971, Storace joined Swiss progressive hard rock band TEA. With them, he toured Europe with big acts such as Queen, Nazareth, or The (Ginger) Baker Gurvitz Army; and released three studio albums: TEA, The Ship and Tax Exiles. All were produced by Dieter Dierks, at that time the man behind the Scorpions. For a while, TEA became Switzerland's international rock Flagship, performing as far as Hamburg, London, Wales, Glasgow, Naples and even Malta.

In 1976, TEA performed their last tour, taking Krokus on-the-road as supporting act. The seed was sown for what followed later on. Meanwhile, he returned to London and formed the band Eazy Money. Their song "Telephone Man" was included on a Metal-Music-Compilation album called Metal for Muthas Vol.2. In 1979, he received a call from Krokus founder Chris Von Rohr, who told him they were looking for a new singer and invited Storace for a "weekend jam" in Switzerland. One exciting long weekend session later, Storace decided to join Chris, Tommy, Fern and Freddie in their quest for success.

== Krokus ==
=== 1980–1988 ===
In 1980, Storace recorded and released his debut album with Krokus, Metal Rendez-vous. It became Krokus's first big International hit album, the first to make the Gold & Platinum Status(today 4 x Platinum). With Storace on board, Krokus's success increased dramatically, and from then until 1988 they toured extensively, mostly in the United States, Canada and Europe, with tours lasting up to nine months, as well as releasing a further six studio albums (Hardware, One Vice at a Time, Headhunter, The Blitz, Change of Address and Heart Attack) and one live album (Alive and Screamin'). It was an intense long period of constant writing, recording and touring without a break. A physically demanding period spent mostly in rehearsal-rooms, recording-studios, hotel-rooms and tour-buses, and all for the common goal of staying in business rocking their fans. During all this time Storace kept his residence in London. Krokus went their ways in the summer of 1988.

=== 1994–2016 ===
In 1994, Storace and Fernando Von Arb re-formed the band, and a Reunion Tour commenced with a reformed "One Vice at a Time " formation, but with Mané Maurer replacing Chris Von Rohr on bass, since he was busy producing Swiss Rockers Gotthard at that time. The turn-out for their concerts was satisfying, so in 1995, Krokus released another studio album, To Rock or Not to Be. It went Gold. The year 2002 saw Krokus, with an altered line-up to that of the 1988 hiatus and 1994 return releasing "Rock The Block". This was followed by one of their most extensive Tours of Europe so far, playing Swedenrock Festival and, on the personal invitation of the late great Claude Nobs (the same "funky Claude" in Deep Purple's "Smoke On The Water":) the prestigious "Montreux Jazz Festival" too. A limited number of DVD's of that Montreux Gig was included with their following release, a Double-Album "Fire & Gasoline" containing magnificent "LIVE" Recordings from many Gigs off their "Rock The Block" European Tour.

A comeback in the USA happened in September 2005 with Mandy Meyer on board, replacing Fernando Von Arb (the latter having undergone surgery to his hand) on lead guitar. It was a very intense Club-Tour in which the band played 22 Gigs in 30 days. The Tour served to enhance the team-spirit in the new line-up before their coming song-writing phase for the follow-up album "Hellraiser". The Hellraiser formation toured Europe as Guests of the Swedish Metalband – Hammerfall. They played places where Krokus had never visited before including Greece and Malta.

In 2007, four members from the old Metal-Rendezvous album line-up: Marc, Fern Chris & Fred, came back together for a three minute slot on a Swiss TV show, Die Grösste Schweizer Hits or The Biggest Swiss Hits. Their short medley was received with a standing ovation by the TV-audience present. This rekindled the band's early 1980s spirit and was followed by a comeback concert of the originals at the "Stade De Suisse" in Bern. Since then a reborn Krokus has given us two more studio-albums: "Hoodoo" and, after a quick line-up change, "Dirty Dynamite". For the latter Storace's vocals were recorded at Abbey Road Studios in London. The third "live" album to date called Longstick Goes Boom, was recorded during five consecutive shows at "Kofmehl" in the band's hometown of Solothurn, Switzerland.

In 2015, Krokus flew to Miami to embark on a promo-tour for their new "live" album, playing the "Monsters Of Rock Cruise" in the Caribbean and then continued with several US dates. They ended their Longstick Goes Boom Tour with two shows at Whisky a Go Go in Los Angeles.

In 2016, Storace's name appeared on various "Lists of Singers" considered as best candidates to replace Brian Johnson as lead vocalist of AC/DC. Krokus were working on a new album at the time.

BIG ROCKS, a collection of covers by artists who influenced individual band members since their teens, was released by Krokus in January 2017. It went to No.1 in the Swiss Chart.

Storace has been Krokus' vocalist/frontman since October 1979, and has sung on all but five of the band's studio recordings.

== Other projects ==
=== Solo project ===
In spring 1989, after Krokus's split and a refreshing break in Malta, Storace returned to Switzerland and wrote songs for his first solo project together with guitar-player Vic Vergeat, his long time friend from the TEA days, The Blue Album. It contains a rare collection of melodic, soul influenced rock songs, and was released in 1991 by Eurostar Germany. BLUE was re-released in 1998 by BMG Records, Switzerland under the new name Vergeat-Storace- When A Man - ! The album was produced by Robert Papst and Vic Vergeat in Münich, Germany. Robert also co-wrote the Swiss-radio-hit "You can`t Stop the Rainfall".

=== Various guest vocal projects ===
Shortly after AC/DC vocalist Bon Scott's death in 1980, Storace was indirectly asked to audition for the job but things were going well for Krokus at the time. He also claimed that, besides his feelings of loyalty to his mates, he felt happy with the way things were going for Krokus.

In 1993, Storace joined as guest with the Swiss rock band China. A live album of the band's one and only tour with Storace in 1993 was eventually released on the CD called "Alive!" in 2000. (This concert was a "live" Swiss radio broadcast of their gig in Sempach released by Phonag Records).

With China's guitarists Freddie Lawrence and Claudio Matteo, Storace formed Acoustical Mountain that same year. This unplugged trio, performing without drums, played rock and roll classics around Switzerland but never released any albums, making them a "live-only" project. They split and then reformed in 1995, this time with China's bassist Brian Kofmehl replacing Lawrence, who moved on to join Swiss melodic-rockers Gotthard. In the meantime Brian was replaced by Charly Preissel on second guitar. Storace and Matteo still perform as a duo at "Private-Events" as Acoustical Mountain, and sometimes with Charly Preissel.

In 1994, during a break in his Krokus reunion duties, Storace joined Manfred Ehlert's Amen to release an album in the same year. Glenn Hughes sang on some tracks. Storace's second album with Amen was Aguilar (1996) with Storace singing all but one track.

In 2003 during another break from Krokus, Storace wrote and recorded with Los Angeles based metal rockers Warrior. This collaboration resulted in the one-off album The Wars of Gods and Men. Released in the USA and Switzerland in 2004, it was Storace's first collaboration with an American band. Working with guitarist and founding member Joe Floyd the album was recorded in Los Angeles.

November 2004 saw German producer Michael Voss invite Storace to collaborate on the new album of the band BISS titled "Face-off" that was released in 2005. It was a melodic rock album and Storace said the songs were "refreshing".

The following year, 2006, saw yet another release by BISS featuring Storace on the album X-Tension.

As of February 2016, Storace has starred in the rock-opera "TEST" in the role of Luke (premiered on 20 February 2016)

During the same year, he recorded the album Muscle & Blood with Billy Stokes and friends in Tucson, Arizona. The album also featured Pat Travers, Les Dudek, Frank Marino and Damon Barnaby on guitars.

== Anuk ==
In 2006, Storace took part in the Swiss-German film Anuk, playing the role of Geisterzunge, a tribal medicine-man / Shaman. Produced by Luke Gasser (who also plays the lead role), the film tells the story of a Bronze Age tribe trying to save itself from eradication by ruthless marauding horsemen in the Swiss Alps. Storace co-wrote the soundtrack with Gasser and sings on the song "On My Own" together with Gasser and Doro Pesch. His Shaman chanting can be heard throughout the movie soundtrack.

== Discography ==
=== Krokus ===
Title	Year
Metal Rendez-vous	CH 1980
Hardware	UK 1981
One Vice at a Time	UK 1982
Headhunter	USA 1983
The Blitz	USA 1984
Change of Address	USA 1986
Alive and Screamin'	USA 1986
Heart Attack	CH 1988
To Rock or Not to Be	CH 1995
Rock the Block	CH 2003
Hellraiser	D 2006
Hoodoo	CH 2010
Dirty Dynamite	CH/UK 2013
Long Stick Goes Boom: Live From Da House of Rust	CH 2014
Big Rocks	CH 2017

=== Others ===
Artist	Title	Year
TEA	TEA	D 1972
TEA	The Ship	D 1975
TEA	Tax Exile	D 1976
Marc Storace	The Blue Album	D 1991
Amen	Amen	CH 1994
Amen	Aguilar	CH 1996
Marc Storace & China	Alive	CH 2000
DC/World	Tribute:Bon & AC / DC	CH 2000
Storace/Haslinger	One World	CH 2000
Warrior	Wars of Gods/Men	USA 2004
Biss	Face-Off	D 2005
Biss	X-tension	D 2006
Billy Stokes	"Muscle & Blood"	USA 2016
Storace	Crossfire	USA 2024
