= Fernando von Arb =

Swiss guitarist (born 1953)

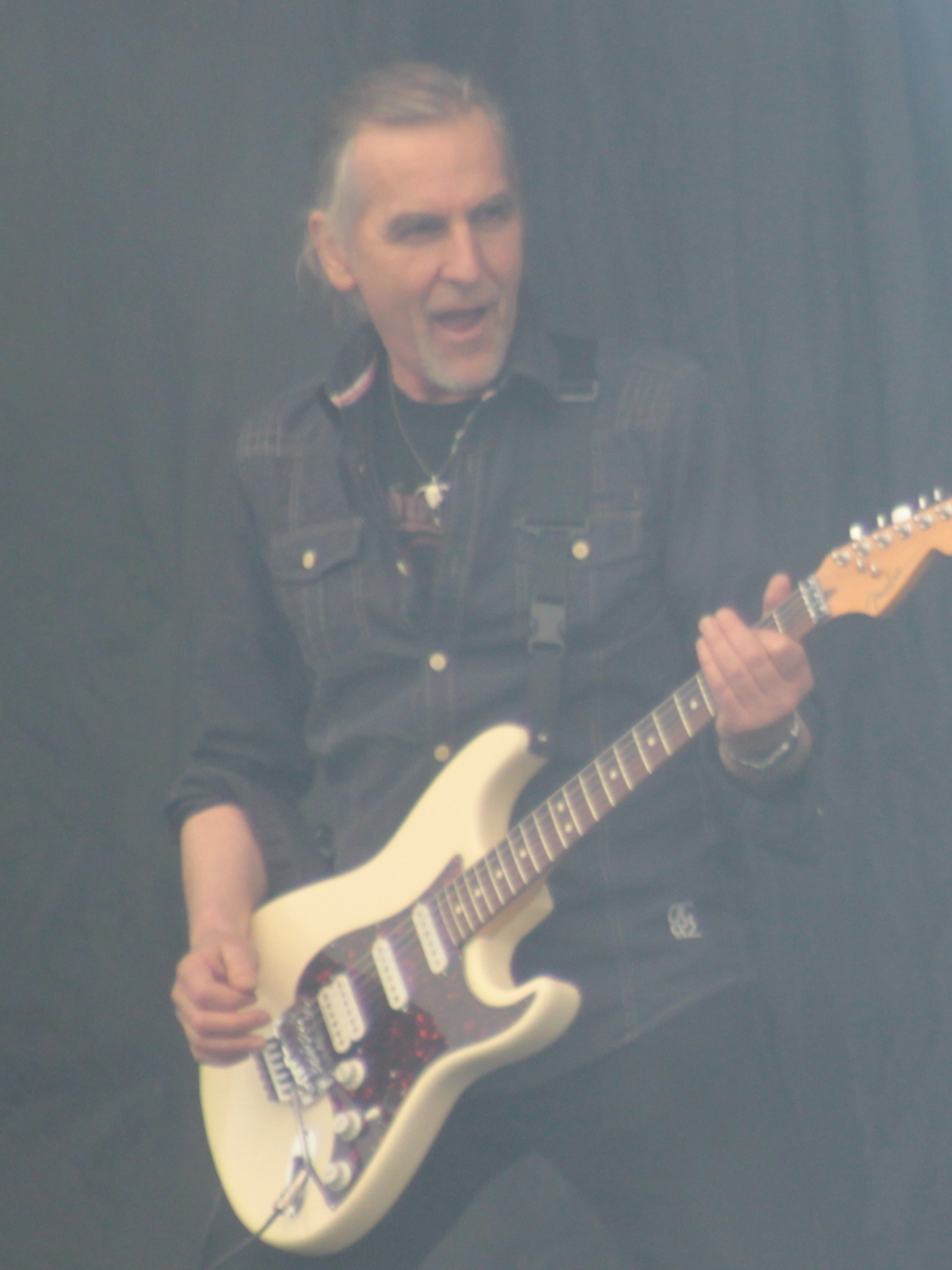
- Von Arb with Krokus in 2013

Background information
- Born: 17 January 1953 (age 73); Fulenbach, Switzerland
- Genres: Hard rock, heavy metal
- Occupations: Musician, songwriter, producer
- Instrument: Guitar
- Years active: 1976–present
- Member of: Krokus
- Formerly of: Montezuma

Fernando von Arb or simply FVA (born 17 January 1953) is a Swiss guitarist, best known as a member of the hard rock band Krokus.

== Career ==
In the early 1970s, von Arb was playing in the band Montezuma when he was recruited by Chris von Rohr and Tommy Kiefer to join their band, Krokus. He joined the group in time for their second album, To You All as the rhythm guitarist. In the 1970s, von Arb undertook the task of finding a powerful voice to front the band, encountering trouble until he discovered Maltese-born Marc Storace to lead his band's vocals for years to come. Although von Arb and Storace have been apart for a few albums, they are still in Krokus to this day. At one point, Storace and von Rohr quit the band, leaving Von Arb to create another band with ex-Krokus member Juerg Naegeli. They took pseudonyms which were Rob Weiss and Ben Branov (Branov is von Arb spelled backward), and the two released a couple of albums that were big in Switzerland.

In 1990, von Arb assembled another line-up for Krokus, which would be shunned and uncared for. Around the same time, von Arb became ill, leading to suspicion that he may have been diagnosed with lymphoma, but he is healthy now.

1994 rolled around, and von Arb again tried to build Krokus. He was successful, with former vocalist Marc Storace rejoining the lineup. Failing to keep Storace in 1999 proved to be a downfall. Round 13 was released, but was less noticed. In 2004, von Arb and Storace reunited once again and released live albums that proved to be an advantage of having Storace.

In 2005, von Arb temporarily left Krokus due to tendonitis in his wrist to be replaced by Mandy Meyer. However, by 2007, he had returned and was able to reunite the four principle members of the group's classic line-up (featuring himself, Storace, von Rohr, and Freddy Steady). By 2008, the group's rhythm guitarist during much of the "classic lineup days," Mark Kohler, had also rejoined the lineup, a landmark in the band's history, and the quintet played several live shows. In 2010, Krokus released the album Hoodoo.

Von Arb and Krokus released Dirty Dynamite on 5 March 2013 with minor success in the US, but a major hit in Switzerland. It contains a cover of The Beatles' hit song "Help!".

In 2017, Krokus and von Arb went on to release their cover album, Big Rocks.

In 2019, Krokus announced that they would be retiring following their farewell tour. Plans for the tour were postponed into 2021 due to the ongoing COVID-19 pandemic.
