= Place Vendome (band) =

German band

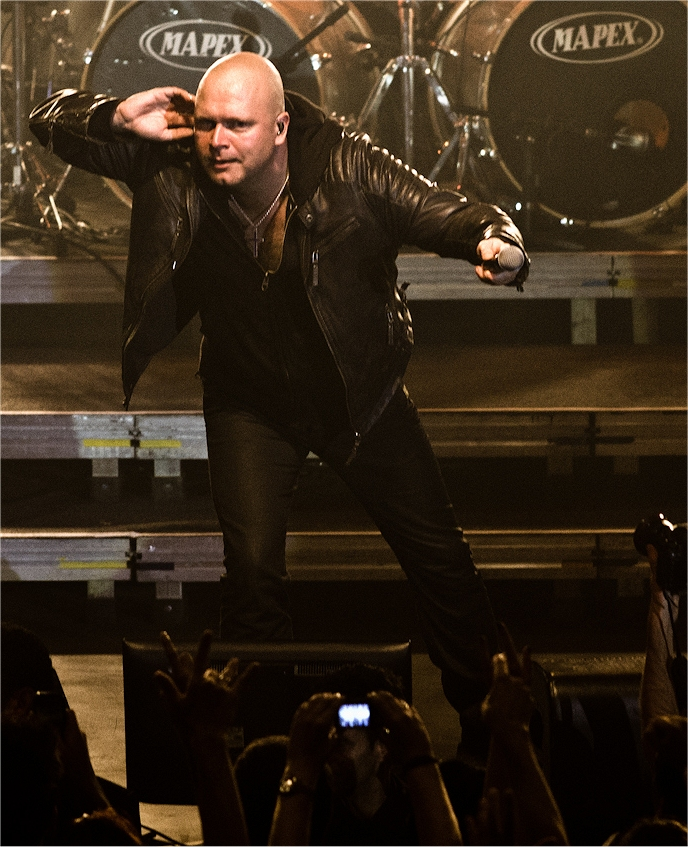

Background information
- Origin: Germany
- Genres: Hard rock, AOR
- Years active: 2004-present
- Label: Frontiers Records
- Members: Michael Kiske; Dennis Ward; Uwe Reitenauer; Gunther Werno; Dirk Bruinenberg
- Past members: Kosta Zafiriou

Place Vendome is a German melodic hard rock / AOR project, founded in 2004 at the direction of Frontiers Records president Serafino Perugino.

Place Vendome was formed by Helloween and Unisonic vocalist Michael Kiske, Dennis Ward (bass and production), Kosta Zafiriou (drums) and Uwe Reitenauer (guitars) from the band Pink Cream 69 and Gunther Werno (keyboards) from the band Vanden Plas.

The project has released four full-length albums; Place Vendome in 2005, Streets of Fire in 2009, Thunder in the Distance in 2013 and Close to the Sun in 2017.

== History ==
=== Debut album (2004–2005) ===
Serafino Perugino devised the idea for the Place Vendome project during the winter of 2004. He approached both Michael Kiske and Dennis Ward with the proposition of recording a melodic rock/AOR album. According to Kiske "The whole band was an idea of Serafino Perugino from Frontiers Records...He first got into contact with Dennis Ward of Pink Cream 69 and hired him to oversee the project...He proposed the idea to me and after hearing the songs, I agreed to do the record. I was impressed by the strength of the material." The songwriting for the debut album, Place Vendome, was provided by Dennis Ward, with further contributions from David Readman and Alfred Koffler.

=== Streets of Fire (2008–2009) ===
Place Vendome's second album was released on February 20, 2009 and featured the same line-up. The songwriting for the Streets of Fire album was provided by Torsti Spoof (Leverage), Ronny Milianowicz (Saint Deamon), Robert Sall (Work of Art) and Magnus Karlsson (Primal Fear). A video was filmed for the song "My Guardian Angel", marking Kiske's visual return since 1996.

According to Kiske "Without Serafino Perugino offering me this Place Vendome project, I would probably never have sung a few of the musical styles on there up to this day (also in terms of lyrics), because my own songwriting is different. But I have found it exactly because of that reason interesting to do: it's like playing roles or testing possibilities. To sing songs you did not write has its own quality: you can learn something here you otherwise probably wouldn't and get a chance to look beyond your own borders."

=== Formation of Unisonic (2009–2012) ===
On November 10, 2009, Place Vendome members Michael Kiske, Dennis Ward and Kosta Zafiriou, joined forces with guitarist Mandy Meyer, to form the hard rock band Unisonic. In 2010, they began their first tour, playing mostly material from the Place Vendome albums, some Helloween classics and only one new song. In 2011, current Gamma Ray and former Helloween guitarist/vocalist Kai Hansen was added to the line-up. During Unisonic's following live performance at Loud Park Festival, the band focused on performing their own material and played only the song "Cross The Line" from the first Place Vendome album. Since Unisonic's self-titled debut album was released in March 2012, the band has not performed any Place Vendome songs during their concerts.

=== Thunder in the Distance (2012–2013) ===
In 2012, Frontiers Records announced that Michael Kiske agreed to start working on a third Place Vendome album. A change in the line-up was also announced, with Dirk Bruinenberg (ex-Adagio) replacing Kosta Zafiriou as the drummer. The band's third album, Thunder in the Distance was released on November 1, 2013. The songwriting for this release was provided by Magnus Karlsson, Timo Tolkki (ex-Stratovarius), Alessandro Del Vecchio (Hardline), Tommy Denander (Radioactive), Roberto Tiranti and Andrea Cantarelli (Labyrinth), Sören Kronqvist (Sunstorm) and Brett Jones. A music video was filmed for the song "Talk To Me".

=== Close to the Sun (2016–2017) ===
In 2016, it was confirmed by Dennis Ward that the fourth Place Vendome album would be entitled Close to the Sun and would feature songs written by Magnus Karlsson, Jani Liimatainen (Cain's Offering, ex-Sonata Arctica), Olaf Thorsen (Vision Divine, Labyrinth), Fabio Lione (Angra, ex-Rhapsody of Fire, Vision Divine), Simone Mularoni (DGM), Aldo Lonobile (Secret Sphere), Alessandro Del Vecchio and Mike Palace. The new album was released on February 24, 2017 and was the first Place Vendome release to feature guest guitar solos by Gus G (Firewind, Ozzy Osbourne), Kai Hansen (Helloween, Gamma Ray, Unisonic), Mandy Meyer (Krokus, Unisonic), Alfred Koffler (Pink Cream 69), Magnus Karlsson, Simone Mularoni and Michael Klein.

== Members ==
- Michael Kiske – vocals
- Dennis Ward – bass guitar
- Uwe Reitenauer – guitars
- Gunther Werno – keyboards
- Dirk Bruinenberg – drums

Former members

- Kosta Zafiriou – drums

== Discography ==
- Place Vendome (2005)
- Streets of Fire (2009)
- Thunder in the Distance (2013)
- Close to the Sun (2017)
