= Time Machine (Axxis album) =

Studio album by Axxis
- Released: 26 January 2004
- Genre: Power metal
- Length: 49:27
- Label: AFM Records

Axxis chronology
Eyes of Darkness (2001)	Time Machine (2004)	Paradise in Flames (2006)

Time Machine, released in 2004, is the ninth full-length album by the German power metal band Axxis. It was released on AFM Records, rather than Massacre Records which Axxis' previous records were.

The making of the album was marred by the band's drummer Richard Michalski going missing. Kosta Zafiriou of Pink Cream 69 stepped in as session drummer, and Dennis Ward of the same band did the mixing.

Time Machine entered the German album charts at #72 on 9 February 2004, only lasting for that one week.

Rock Hard regarded it as a mediocre album, 6.5 out of 10. Norway's Scream Magazine surmised that Axxis was "relatively close to" having made a consistently strong record. A couple of songs below average nonetheless led to a rating of 4 out of 6, though listeners should "absolutely" give Time Machine a chance. Blabbermouth graded it about the same, at 7.5 of 10. The reviewer recognized that this "sort of AOR-with-balls tends to get ignored in the U.S.", and the album was also distributed in the US quite belatedly, by Locomotive Music. Though Axxis vocalist Bernhard Weiss had "one of those idiosyncratic love-it-or-hate-it voices", the Blabbermouth reviewer took a liking to "his charismatic vocals and infectious melody lines", his "personality and character".

Powermetal.de concurred that the singer's "voice has always been a double-edged sword, leaving little room for debate. You either love it or hate it. The vocal performance of this likeable chatterbox is undeniably excellent". The album was consistent, catchy and "thrilling" with not a single weak track. Vampster saw the album as befitting the "target audience" of Axxis, while also "hopefully" winning over more people than "only the fans. The album was well arranged and instrumented, featured "diverse song material", "powerful choral and backing vocals" and "an absolutely excellent production".

Allmusic rated Time Machinee poorly, 2 out of 5. The reviewer lamented the lack of progress in the band's sound since their debut in 1989. Some songs were stronger, but some were "predictable fare" and others "dated and sappy". Therefore, "for inhabitants of the new millennium, it's little more than a curiosity and an anachronism".

== Track listing ==
1. "Mystery of Time" — 1:04
2. "Angel of Death" — 5:00
3. "Time Machine" — 5:08
4. "Wind in the Night (Shalom)" — 4:50
5. "Lost in the Darkness" — 3:47
6. "The Demons Are Calling" — 3:57
7. "Wings of Freedom" — 4:38
8. "Dance in the Starlight" — 4:17
9. "Battle of Power" — 3:34
10. "Alive" — 4:49
11. "Gimme Your Blood" — 4:15
12. "Don't Drag Me Down" — 4:08
