= Pierpaolo Monti =

Italian drummer, songwriter and producer

- Also known as: Pierpaolo "Zorro11" Monti
- Born: Pierpaolo Monti
- Origin: Italy
- Genres: Rock, Hard rock
- Occupation(s): Musician, songwriter, producer
- Instrument: Drums

Pierpaolo Monti is an Italian drummer, songwriter and producer born in Italy. He is the founding member, main songwriter and mastermind behind the AOR all star projects Shining Line and Charming Grace.

== Musician career ==
Monti founded his first band, Sovversivo, in 1999 before leaving it in 2004 to pursue a personal career in Melodic Rock and AOR music. In 2008 he founded, with his longtime friend Amos Monti, an AOR all-star project called Shining Line, that was officially released in 2010 by German label Avenue Of Allies Music, receiving acclaim from fans and critics.

In 2011 he founded, with Italian singer/songwriter Stefano Lionetti and Italian progressive rock mastermind Alessandro Del Vecchio, a new AOR project called Lionville, released the same year by Avenue Of Allies Music. He took part in the recording sessions playing drums and providing lyrics for all the tracks of the album, except for the cover songs "Thunder In Your Heart" (originally recorded and performed by John Farnham) and "World Without Your Love" (originally written by Richard Marx and Bruce Gaitsch). In the same year he started working together with his bandmate in Shining Line Amos Monti on a new AOR project called Charming Grace, involving in it their label mate Davide Barbieri (of Wheels Of Fire fame) as third official main member.

In 2012 he appeared as guest musician playing drums on two melodic rock releases: AOR "L.A. Temptation" (released by AOR Heaven) and Chasing Violets "Outside Heaven" (released by Perris Records). In the same year he also provided his songwriting contribution composing lyrics for two more official releases: Wheels Of Fire "Up For Anything" (Avenue Of Allies Music) and Lionville "II" (Avenue Of Allies Music), and wrote and performed (together with producer Alessandro Del Vecchio) a new song called "Melody Rocks", which became the official anthem for the world-renowned site Melodicrock.com (the song is available into the official compilation of the website, MRCD9 "15 Years Later" released the same year).

In 2013, Charming Grace was finally released by Avenue Of Allies Music. Monti appears in it once again as drummer and main songwriter, and for the first time in the role of co-producer, supporting the work of Davide Barbieri. The album received critical acclaim across the world, including highly positive reviews just like "Hot Album" (by Ant Heeks) and "Spot On Album" (Melodic Round-Up column by Dave Ling) in the UK issues of the renowned printed magazines Fireworks and Classic Rock. In November 2013, due to the very good feedbacks received from the melodic rock community, Charming Grace was signed by Japanese-based label Rubicon Music for a release in Japan (official release date: 18 December 2013). The Japanese version contains an exclusive bonus track called "Start All Over Again", which is not included in the standard cd format of the album.

Year 2014 sees the official announcement of a brand new melodic rock project called Room Experience (led by Italian songwriter Gianluca Firmo and fronted by Pink Cream 69 / Voodoo Circle's singer David Readman ), with Monti involved in the roles of co-producer and drummer. On the songwriting side, he provided his contribution to the come-back of ex-Vanilla Ninja Lenna Kuurmaa under the moniker "Moonland", penning the song "Over Me" in collaboration with Davide Barbieri and Alessandro Del Vecchio.

In 2015 Room Experience is scheduled for release on May 22 via MelodicRock Records. The album is launched in two different formats: a standard edition with eleven tracks, and a strictly limited edition with 3 bonus tracks (and alternate cover artwork) available only for the pre-orders submitted on the official label's website. In the second half of the year, Monti recruited all together members from various Italian melodic rock bands and projects under the name of "I.F.O.R" (a.k.a. "Italian Forces Of Rock"). The result of this collaboration is the single "We Still Rock" (co-written and co-produced by Monti itself), launched to the audience with a YouTube video on the official Melodicrock.it YouTube Channel, and scheduled for the digital release via Tanzan Music on 14 December 2015.

Year 2016 sees Monti founding (together with Davide Barbieri) Raintimes, a brand new melodic rock project which marks the come-back of Von Groove's frontman Michael Shotton as lead vocalist on a full-length studio album after more than 10 years. The debut, which is scheduled for release in early 2017 via Frontiers Music SRL, is going to cover stylistically the classic AOR/Melodic Rock sound of 90's act The Storm. In the meanwhile the brand new co-operation with Frontiers Music SRL is established with the release of the second musical chapter of First Signal (one of the label's own studio projects, feat. Harry Hess on Vocals), with Monti appearing in the songwriting credits thanks to the song "Love Gets Through" (written in collaboration with Davide Barbieri and Dave Zublena), launched as first single on YouTube in a lyric-video format. In the same year the single "We Still Rock" has been included in a s/t compilation released by Italian label Tanzan Music, which sees the involvement, in the final tracklist, of some of the most known melodic rock and AOR acts coming from Italy. Monti appears involved in further tracks inside the compilation, included the brand new song "Gotta Get Away" from Charming Grace, a tune created appositely as official soundtrack of "Hold On! - Tomorrow", fourth chapter of the #1 Amazon sci-fi saga "Hold On!" by English independent novelist Peter Darley. Again in 2016 Monti signed a deal with Street Symphonies Records for the official reissue of Shining Line's debut album, which includes in this new edition an exclusive bonus track called "This Is Our Life" previously unreleased.

In 2018, Italian independent label Burning Minds Music Group announced Monti as new official A&R Director, establishing a partnership born in 2016 after the release of the official Shining Line's reissue. In the same year Monti was announced as official producer for the new studio album of three different artists: Italian hard-rockers Alchemy, international melodic rock project Room Experience, and melodic rock project Streetlore.

== Discography ==
=== with Shining Line ===
- Shining Line 2010
- Shining Line - Reissue (w/ 1 Bonus Track) 2016

=== with Charming Grace ===
- Charming Grace 2013

=== with Raintimes ===
- Raintimes 2017

=== As producer/guest musician/songwriter ===
- Room Experience - Room Experience 2015
- Room Experience - Another Time And Place 2020

=== As producer ===
- Alchemy - Dyadic 2019

=== As songwriter ===
- Lionville - Lionville 2011
- Lionville - II 2012
- Wheels Of Fire - Up For Anything 2012
- Moonland feat. Lenna Kuurmaa 2014
- First Signal - One Step Over the Line 2016
- Wheels Of Fire - Begin Again 2019

=== As guest musician ===
- Lionville - Lionville 2011
- Chasing Violets - Outside Heaven 2012
- AOR - L.A. Temptation 2012

=== Singles ===
- I.F.O.R. - "We Still Rock" 2015
- Charming Grace - Gotta Get Away 2016
- Maryan - Like A Dragonfly 2019
- Maryan - Turn Of The Tide 2019

=== Various artists compilations ===
- MRCD7 - Forces Of Dark And Light 2010 (with Shining Line)
- MRCD8 - The Next Chapter 2011 (with Shining Line)
- MRCD9 - 15 Years Later 2012 (with MelRock Orchestra)
- MRCD13 - Peak Melodic 2015 (with Room Experience)
- We Still Rock - The Compilation 2016
