= Davide Barbieri =

- Also known as: Davide "Dave Rox" Barbieri
- Born: Davide Barbieri
- Origin: Italy
- Genres: Rock, Hard rock
- Occupations: Singer, musician, songwriter, producer
- Instruments: Vocals, keyboards, guitar

Davide Barbieri is an Italian singer, keyboardist and producer born in Italy. He is the founding member, main songwriter and mastermind of the Italian melodic hard-rock band Wheels Of Fire and the founding member, singer and songwriter behind the AOR all star project Charming Grace.

== Artist career ==
Barbieri started his career in music at the age of 9 as keyboards player in some local bands, but it's only in the beginning of the new millennium that he discovered his passion for singing: he soon decided to approach Italian renowned rock/metal singer Michele Luppi (Vision Divine, Secret Sphere, Los Angeles, Killing Touch, and now official keyboards player and backing Vocalist of legendary rock masters Whitesnake) who became soon his vocal coach.

In the second half of 2000 he joined New Jersey (Bon Jovi's tribute band), and then recorded the full-length debut albums of two progressive metal acts called Seventh Archangel and Liquid Shadows. Anyway his passionate love for hard-rock and melodic rock music convinced Barbieri to pursue an artistic career in that kind music, a course that culminated in the foundation of his first personal band, called Wheels Of Fire.

The recordings of the first studio album started under the guidance and artistic support of producer and vocal coach Michele Luppi, while mix and mastering duties were handled by Italian known sound engineer and guitar player Roberto Priori.

The Wheels Of Fire's debut "Hollywood Rocks" was released in 2010 by German label Avenue Of Allies Music, receiving a very good feedback from fans and critics. The European version was quickly followed also by a Japanese dedicated release, which reached the #42 position on the charts of Burrn! magazine, confirming the growing state of Wheels Of Fire's fanbase around the world. Year 2012 sees the second official album "Up For Anything" released on the market once again via Avenue Of Allies Music, followed by the official Japanese edition edited by Japanese-based label Rubicon Music. The new work seen the involvement of two known guests of the melodic hard-rock world just like James Christian (House of Lords) and Rob Marcello (Danger Danger, Marcello/Vestry), with Roberto Priori at the helm once again on the mix and mastering processes.

In the same year Davide was approached by Shining Line's drummer and mastermind Pierpaolo Monti, who offered him to join forces together on a brand new AOR all star project called Charming Grace. They completed the basic line-up with the involvement of bass-player Amos Monti (Shining Line), and started the works following the concept of writing songs in the classic style of the 80s and recording them as duets. Barbieri proved his skills as singer sharing lead vocals in the various songs with some of the best vocalists of past and present melodic rock scene (David Forbes of Boulevard, Moon Calhoun of Michael Thompson Band, Nick Workman of Vega, Alessandro Del Vecchio of Edge Of Forever and Michele Luppi itself between others), while Charming Grace was signed once again by Avenue Of Allies for a worldwide release in 2013, followed by the sign with Japanese-based label Rubicon Music for a dedicated release in Japan. Before the end of the year he also provided backing vocals for "Melody Rocks", song available into the official compilation of Melodicrock.com "MRCD9 - 15 Years Later".

Year 2014 sees Barbieri collaborating with Pierpaolo Monti and Alessandro Del Vecchio in the composition of "Over Me", song included in the debut album of "Moonland" (a Frontiers Records studio project feat. the ex-Vanilla Ninja Lenna Kuurmaa). In the same year he was also involved as producer and guest musician (together with Pierpaolo Monti) in Room Experience, a brand new international recording project born after a meeting with Italian songwriter Gianluca Firmo, who asked them to produce his first studio work. The debut album, fronted by Pink Cream 69 / Voodoo Circle's singer David Readman, was released the following year via MelodicRock Records in two different formats (a standard edition with eleven tracks, and a strictly limited edition with 3 bonus tracks available only for the pre-orders submitted on the official label's website).

In 2015 Barbieri founded (once again together with Pierpaolo Monti) a new national rock legacy called "I.F.O.R" (a.k.a. "Italian Forces Of Rock"), in which they recruited all together members from various Italian melodic rock bands and projects, with the intention of paying homage to the classic melodic hard-rock sound of the golden era of the genre. The result of this collaboration is the single "We Still Rock" (co-written and co-produced by Barbieri itself), launched to the audience with a YouTube video on the official Melodicrock.it YouTube Channel, and scheduled for the digital release via Tanzan Music on 14 December 2015.

Year 2016 sees Barbieri founding (together with Pierpaolo Monti) Raintimes, a brand new melodic rock project which marks the come-back of Von Groove's frontman Michael Shotton as lead vocalist on a full-length studio album after more than 10 years. The debut, which is scheduled for release in early 2017 via Frontiers Music SRL, is going to cover stylistically the classic AOR/Melodic Rock sound of 90's act The Storm. In the meanwhile the brand new co-operation with Frontiers Music SRL is established with the release of the second musical chapter of First Signal (one of the label's own studio projects, feat. Harry Hess on Vocals), with Barbieri appearing in the songwriting credits thanks to the song "Love Gets Through" (written in collaboration with Pierpaolo Monti and Dave Zublena), launched as first single on YouTube in a lyric-video format. In the same year the single "We Still Rock" has been included in a s/t compilation released by Italian label Tanzan Music, which sees the involvement, in the final tracklist, of some of the most known melodic rock and AOR acts coming from Italy. Barbieri appears involved in further tracks inside the compilation, included an acoustic version of "Love Nest" from Wheels Of Fire and the brand new song "Gotta Get Away" from Charming Grace, a tune created appositely as official soundtrack of "Hold On! - Tomorrow", fourth chapter of the #1 Amazon sci-fi saga "Hold On!" by English independent novelist Peter Darley.

In 2018 Barbieri helped Gianluca Firmo in the making of his debut's album "Rehab" taking care of vocal production and background vocals.

The first months of 2019 saw him involved in the vocal production of the second album by the Italian band Alchemy "Dyadic". 2019 also sees Barbieri's come back as singer and producer with Wheels Of Fire's third album "Begin Again". After seven years from the last album "Up For Anything", the new album was released in June by the new italian's label Art Of Melody Music, followed by the official Japanese edition in July by Bikee Music.

== Discography ==
=== with Wheels Of Fire ===
- 2010 - Hollywood Rocks
- 2012 - Up For Anything
- 2019 - Begin Again
- 2025 - All In

=== with Charming Grace ===
- 2013 - Charming Grace

=== with Raintimes ===
- 2017 - Raintimes

=== As producer/guest musician/songwriter ===
- Room Experience - S/T 2015
- We Still Rock...The Compilation - S/T 2016
- Gianluca Firmo - Rehab 2018
- Alchemy - Dyadic 2019
- Room Experience - Another Time and Place 2020
- Wine Guardian - Timescape 2020
- Streetlore - S/T 2022
- Crazy Lixx - Thrill of the Bite 2025
- We Still Rock...The World - S/T 2025

=== As songwriter ===
- Moonland feat. Lenna Kuurmaa 2014
- First Signal - One Step Over the Line 2016

=== As guest musician ===
- Bonfire - Glorious 2015 (Backing Vocals)
- Airbound - S/T 2017 (Backing Vocals)
- Gianluca Firmo - Rehab 2018 (Backing Vocals)
- Crazy Lixx - Thrill of the Bite 2025 (Backing Vocals)

=== Singles ===
- I.F.O.R. - We Still Rock 2015
- Charming Grace - Gotta Get Away 2016
- Maryan - Like A Dragonfly 2019
- Maryan - Turn Of The Tide 2019
- Wheels Of Fire - We Will Rise 2020

=== Various artists compilations ===
- MRCD9 - 15 Years Later 2012 (with MelRock Orchestra)
- MRCD13 - Peak Melodic 2015 (with Room Experience)
- We Still Rock - The Compilation 2016
- We Still Rock - The World 2025
