= Place Vendome (Place Vendome album) =

Studio album by Place Vendome
- Released: October 10, 2005
- Genre: Hard rock
- Length: 45:23
- Label: Frontiers Records
- Producer: Dennis Ward

Place Vendome chronology
Place Vendome (2005)	Streets of Fire (2009)

Professional ratings
Review scores
Source	Rating
Allmusic	3.5/5 stars
Melodic Rock	9.5/10 stars
Lords of Metal	9.2/10 stars

Place Vendome is the debut album of the hard rock project Place Vendome. The songwriting for this album was provided by Dennis Ward (Pink Cream 69), with further contributions from David Readman and Alfred Koffler.

The album received very positive reviews and was hailed as vocalist's Michael Kiske's glorious return to a heavier rock sound, since his exit from the German power metal band Helloween in 1993.

It was released on 10 October 2005 with cover art credited to Carl André Beckston.

== Track listing ==
No.	Title	Lyrics	Music	Length
1.	"Cross the Line"	Dennis Ward	Ward/Uwe Reitenauer	4:56
2.	"I Will Be Waiting"	Ward	Ward	4:56
3.	"Too Late"	Ward	Ward	4:17
4.	"I Will Be Gone"	Ward	Ward/Reitenauer	5:12
5.	"The Setting Sun"	Ward	Ward/Günter Werno	4:48
6.	"Place Vendome"	Ward	Ward	3:58
7.	"Heaven's Door"	Alfred Koffler/David Readman	Koffler	4:06
8.	"Right Here"	Peter Winter	Koffler	4:13
9.	"Magic Carpet Ride"	Ward	Ward	4:01
10.	"Sign of the Times"	Ward	Ward	5:16

=== Japanese Bonus Track ===
No.	Title	Lyrics	Music	Length
11.	"Photograph"	Ward	Ward	4:40

== Credits ==
=== Band members ===
- Michael Kiske – vocals
- Uwe Reitenauer – guitars
- Dennis Ward – bass, producer
- Kosta Zafiriou – drums
- Gunther Werno - keyboards

=== Additional personnel ===
- Carolin Wolf – backing vocals (2, 4)
- Alfred Koffler – extra guitars (7, 8)
