= Dominate (album) =

Studio album by Adagio
- Released: 16 December 2005
- Recorded: November 2005
- Genre: Progressive metal, symphonic metal, power metal
- Length: 47:19

Adagio chronology
A Band in Upperworld (2004)	Dominate (2005)	Archangels in Black (2009)

Dominate is the third album by French progressive metal band Adagio. It was produced by Stéphan Forté and Kevin Codfert and mixed at House of Audio Studios in Germany by Dennis Ward. It is the first and only Adagio album to feature Gus Monsanto on vocals.

== Track listing ==
1. "Fire Forever" – 4:11
2. "Dominate" – 5:59
3. "Terror Jungle" – 5:15
4. "Children of the Dead Lake" – 6:04
5. "R'lyeh the Dead" – 8:25
6. "The Darkitecht" – 6:18
7. "Kissing the Crow" – 2:28
8. "Fame" (Irene Cara cover) – 4:01
9. "Undying" (US bonus track) – 4:34

== Personnel ==
- Gus Monsanto – vocals
- Stéphan Forté – guitar
- Franck Hermanny – bass
- Kevin Codfert – keyboards
- Eric Lébailly – drums

== Charts ==
Chart (2005)	Peak position
French Albums (SNEP)	193
