= Room Experience =

Studio album by Room Experience
- Released: 22 May 2015
- Recorded: January–December 2014
- Genres: Hard rock Melodic Rock; AOR
- Length: 52:07
- Label: Melodic Rock Records
- Producers: Davide Barbieri; Pierpaolo Monti

Singles from Room Experience
- 1. "Run To You" Released: 7 May 2015

Room Experience is a rock album that was released in both a regular and a 500 copies sold out limited edition by Melodic Rock Records on 22 May 2015. It is distributed worldwide by Cargo Records UK.

Vocals are led by David Readman (Pink Cream 69, Voodoo Circle), while renowned musicians from all over Europe (Ivan Gonzalez, Sven Larsson, Boris Matakovic amongst the others) make their guest appearances in the record.

The album was produced by Davide Barbieri and Pierpaolo Monti, while star producer Alessandro Del Vecchio took care of mixing and mastering duties. It received enthusiastic reviews all over the world, being named as one of the best albums of 2015 by selected websites and magazines specialized in this kind of music.

== Band members ==
David Readman: vocals, backing vocals
Gianluca Firmo: keyboards, vocals, backing vocals
Steve De Biasi: electric guitars
Davide Barbieri: backing vocals, keyboards, acoustic guitars
Amos Monti: bass guitar
Pierpaolo Monti: drums and percussions

== Guest musicians ==
Alessandro Del Vecchio: Hammond organ
Ivan Gonzalez: acoustic and electric guitars
Sven Larsson: acoustic and electric guitars
Boris Matakovic: saxophone
Andrea Gipponi: bass guitar
Stefano Zeni: electric guitars
Nicoletta Tona: electric guitars
Minna Ora: backing vocals
Aurë: backing vocals

== Track list ==
1. Shock Me (3:42) (words: Gianluca Firmo, Gimmy Firmo – music: Gianluca Firmo)
2. Tomorrows Came (4:42) (words & music: Gianluca Firmo)
3. Run To You (4:38) (words & music: Gianluca Firmo)
4. Queen Of Every Heart (3:59) (words & music: Gianluca Firmo)
5. Another Day Without You (4:13) (words & music: Gianluca Firmo)
6. One Way Out (3:42) (words: Gianluca Firmo – music: Gianluca Firmo, Davide Barbieri, Pierpaolo Monti)
7. The Only Truth (4:11) (words & music: Gianluca Firmo)
8. Not Time Yet For A Lullaby (3:29) (words & music: Gianluca Firmo)
9. Rainbow In The Rain (5:11) (words & music: Gianluca Firmo)
10. No Signs Of Summer (4:12) (words & music: Gianluca Firmo)
11. Only Goodnight (9:49) (words: Gianluca Firmo – music: Gianluca Firmo, Davide Barbieri, Pierpaolo Monti)
- Ghost track: Something In The Wind (words & music: Gianluca Firmo)

Bonus Tracks included in the limited edition:
Siren's Song (words: Gianluca Firmo – music: Gianluca Firmo, Davide Barbieri, Pierpaolo Monti)
Wounds Of Love (words: Gianluca Firmo – music: Gianluca Firmo, Davide Barbieri, Pierpaolo Monti)
Only Goodnight (vocals by David Readman) (words: Gianluca Firmo – music: Gianluca Firmo, Davide Barbieri, Pierpaolo Monti)
