= Ceremonial (Pink Cream 69 album) =

Studio album by Pink Cream 69
- Released: 25 January 2013
- Genre: Hard rock, heavy metal
- Length: 49:21
- Label: Frontiers
- Producer: Dennis Ward

Pink Cream 69 chronology
In10sity (2007)	Ceremonial (2013)	Headstrong (2017)

Professional ratings
Review scores
Source	Rating
Metal Forces	(6/10)

Ceremonial is the 11th album by Hard rock band Pink Cream 69, released in 2013. It's the band's first album with a new line-up change, this time featuring drummer Chris Schmidt replacing founding member Kosta Zafiriou.

== Background ==
Some statements about the album written by bass player/producer Dennis Ward and vocalist David Readman: "We deliberately called the album “Ceremonial" because we feel it's kind of a celebration of music styles we all grew up with, regardless of what PC69 has done in the past", Ward. "There were various projects that I was involved in over the last couple of years", adds singer David Readman. "But the work on “Ceremonial" felt like coming home. A real relief."

== Track listing ==
All songs written by Alfred Koffler and Dennis Ward, except where noted.

No.	Title	Writer(s)	Length
1.	"Land of Confusion"		4:40
2.	"Wasted Years"		3:55
3.	"Special"	Ward	4:02
4.	"Find Your Soul"		3:42
5.	"The Tide"	Ward	4:13
6.	"Big Machine"	David Readman, Ward	4:01
7.	"Let the Thunder Roll"	Ward	3:38
8.	"Right from Wrong"	Readman, Uwe Reitenauer	3:33
9.	"Passage of Time"		4:27
10.	"I Came to Rock"		4:30
11.	"King for One Day"	Readman	4:05
12.	"Superman"		4:35

== Personnel ==
- David Readman – vocals
- Alfred Koffler – guitar, keyboards
- Uwe Reitenauer – guitar
- Dennis Ward – bass guitar, keyboards, backing vocals
- Chris Schmidt – drums
