= Prometheus, Symphonia Ignis Divinus =

Studio album by Luca Turilli's Rhapsody
- Released: June 19, 2015 (EU); June 22, 2015 (UK); June 30, 2015 (US)
- Recorded: Backyard Studios, Kempten, Germany
- Genre: Symphonic power metal
- Length: 69:36
- Label: Nuclear Blast
- Producer: Luca Turilli

Luca Turilli's Rhapsody chronology
Ascending to Infinity (2012)	Prometheus, Symphonia Ignis Divinus (2015)

Prometheus, Symphonia Ignis Divinus (Latin: "Prometheus, Symphony: The Divine Fire", also sometimes stylized as Prometheus — Symphonia Ignis Divinus or Prometheus: Symphonia Ignis Divinus) is the second and final studio album by the Italian symphonic power metal band Luca Turilli's Rhapsody, created by Luca Turilli after his departure from Rhapsody of Fire. It was released on June 19, 2015, via Nuclear Blast. Turilli considers it one of the most important albums of his career: Prometheus, Symphonia Ignis Divinus was the first album ever to be mixed in Dolby Atmos and the music of the same was used by Dolby and Yamaha to promote Dolby Atmos technology worldwide.

It is the only album with Alex Landenburg on drums, following Alex Holzwarth's departure shortly after the recording of the previous album, Ascending to Infinity, in order to focus on Rhapsody of Fire. The first single, "Rosenkreuz (The Rose and The Cross)", was released April 24, 2015.

== Composition ==
Luca Turilli composed the songs and arranged all the orchestral parts of the album in seven months. The creation of the album involved three more months of production, over 50 days of mixing, working with two choirs, several special guests, including Ralf Scheepers (Primal Fear), Dan Lucas (KARO), and David Readman (Pink Cream 69).

The 70-minute album sounds cinematic, bombastic and dramatic. The music is meant to lead the listener on an emotional and memorable journey between quantum gates, parallel dimensions, myths and legends hiding cosmic truths, ancestral secrets and spiritual revelations.

== Track listing ==
All tracks are written by Luca Turilli.

No.	Title	Length
1.	"Nova Genesis (Ad Splendorem Angeli Triumphantis)"	3:08
2.	"Il cigno nero"	4:08
3.	"Rosenkreuz (The Rose and the Cross)"	4:34
4.	"Anahata"	5:03
5.	"Il tempo degli dei"	5:03
6.	"One Ring to Rule Them All"	7:05
7.	"Notturno"	4:34
8.	"Prometheus"	5:06
9.	"King Solomon and the 72 Names of God"	6:51
10.	"Yggdrasil"	6:00
11.	"Of Michael The Archangel and Lucifer’s Fall Part II: Codex Nemesis; I. "Codex Nemesis Alpha Omega"; II. "Symphonia Ignis Divinus (The Quantum Gate Revealed)"; III. "The Astral Convergence"; IV. "The Divine Fire of the Archangel"; V. "Of Psyche and Archetypes (System Overloaded)""	18:04: 2:12; 7:47; 1:06; 4:03; 2:56

Digipack bonus track
No.	Title	Writer(s)	Length
12.	"Thundersteel" (Riot cover)	Mark Reale, Don Van Stavern	4:32

== Personnel ==
Band members

- Alessandro Conti - lead vocals
- Luca Turilli - guitar, keyboards, orchestral arrangements, producer, engineer, cover concept
- Dominique Leurquin - guitar
- Patrice Guers - bass
- Alex Landenburg - drums

Additional musicians

- Ralf Scheepers - co-lead vocals on "Thundersteel"
- David Readman - vocals
- Dan Lucas - vocals
- Bridget Fogle - vocals
- Emilie Ragni - vocals

Production

- Sebastian Roeder - engineer, mixing
- Christoph Stickel - mastering
- Stefan "Heile" Heilemann - cover art

== Charts ==
Chart (2015)	Peak position
Belgian Albums (Ultratop Flanders)	178
Belgian Albums (Ultratop Wallonia)	158
French Albums (SNEP)	88
German Albums (Offizielle Top 100)	70
Japanese Albums (Oricon)	78
Hungarian Albums (MAHASZ)	34
Italian Albums (FIMI)	43
Swiss Albums (Schweizer Hitparade)	82
