= Gianluca Firmo =

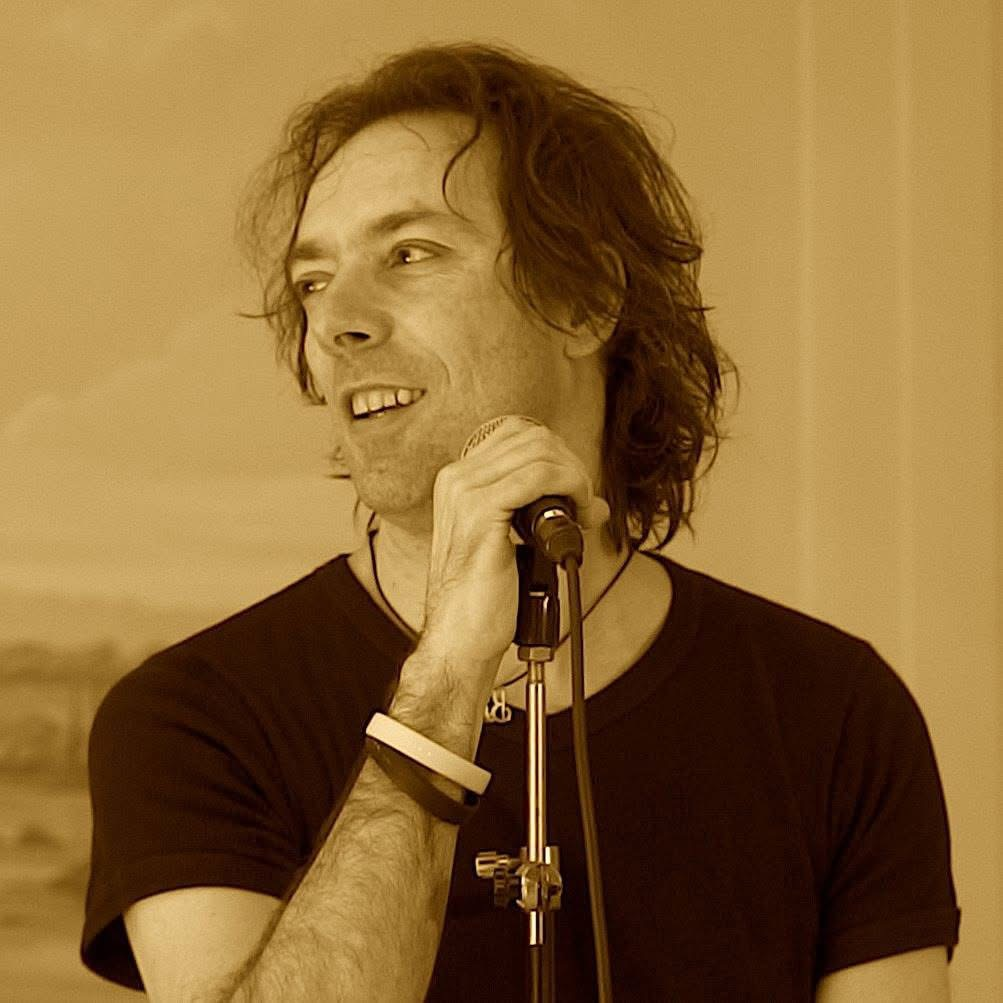

Background information
- Born: 1 August 1973 (age 53); Brescia, Italy
- Origin: Italy
- Genres: Melodic Rock; Hard Rock; AOR
- Occupations: Songwriter, Singer and musician
- Instrument: Keyboard
- Label: Melodic Rock Records
- Website: Archived copy

Gianluca Firmo (born August 1, 1973) is an Italian singer, songwriter and keyboard player. Firmo was also the main songwriter on Room Experience, an international melodic rock project featuring David Readman.

== Musical career ==
In 2013, Firmo met Davide Barbieri and Pierpaolo Monti and created a melodic rock project called Room Experience, based on his own songs and featuring David Readman (Pink Cream 69, Voodoo Circle) on vocals, as well as many other guest musicians from the European AOR/Melodic hard rock scene. His debut album Room Experience (released in 2015 by the Australian label Melodic Rock Records, and distributed by Cargo Records UK) was well-received by critics.

In 2015, Firmo was recruited by producers Pierpaolo Monti and Davide Barbieri to be part of the I.F.O.R project (Italian Forces of Rock). He co-wrote lyrics and sang the melodic rock anthem "We Still Rock" alongside Alessandro Del Vecchio, Josh Zighetti, Franco Campanella, and others from the Italian rock and AOR scene. The single was released exclusively in digital format by Tanzan Music. In the same year, "Tomorrows Came", taken from the Room Experience album, was included in MRCD13 "Melodic Peak", the collectors compilation, released by Melodic Rock Records.

In 2016, his debut album Room Experience was released in Japan by Anderstein Music.

In 2016, Firmo contributed as songwriter to Raintimes, an international band led by Pierpaolo Monti and Davide Barbieri, featuring Michael Shotton (Von Groove, L.R.S.) on vocals, Sven Larsson and Ivan Gonzalez on guitars and Andrea Gipponi on bass. In 2017, Frontiers Records released A World of Fools, the third album by Lionville, where Firmo penned the title track and Bring Me Back Our Love, along with Bruce Gaitsch.

in 2018, under Street Symphonies Records and Burning Minds Music Group, he released his first solo album Rehab, taking care also of vocal parts, with the contributions of some of the best italian musicians: Mattia Tedesco on guitars, Nicola Iazzi on bass guitar, Daniele Valseriati on Drums. In addition to that, many international guests contributed to the album: Paul Laine (backing vocals on the second single Heart of stone, Pier Mazzini (Danger Zone), Mario Percudani (Hungryheart), Stefano Zeni (Wheels of Fire), Erik Mårtensson (Eclipse), Davide Barbieri (Wheels of Fire), Carlo Poddighe (SuperEgo). The same year, a dedicated Japanese released of the album was published by Anderstein Music, featuring Bruce Gaitsch and Erik Mårtensson (Eclipse) in the acoustic rendition of Cowboys Once, Cowboys Forever, added as bonus track.

In 2019 he co-wrote the song Call My Name featured in the album Begin Again by Wheels of Fire, taking care of the lyrics.

2020 marked the return of Room Experience's second chapter, by the title of Another time and place. the first single Hear another song was released in march. Once again the record was stars-studded and all the previous guests made their appearance once again, with the addition of Simon Dredo on bass guitar. The album was released, once again, on May 22, just like the first record.

Hear another song was later used as soundtrack in a book by the british novelist Peter Darley.

The same year, he penned again a few songs on Lionville's new album, Magic is alive, once again released by Frontiers Record: You're Not Alone and Living With the Truth.

Again, the song You're Not Alone was used in Wingers, a book by Tom Gillman.

in 2026 Burning Minds Music Group released the follow up to We Still Rock - The Compilation, by the title of We Still Rock...The World, featuring Gianluca on vocal duties for the song A Thousand Lies (alternative version of the song already present on Another Time And Place) and as songwriter for the songs Cowboys Forever (cover by Laneslide of Firmo's 2018 song Cowboys Once, Cowboys Forever) and Before That Night, by Broken Carillon, where he also plays keyboards.

Discography

=== Albums ===
- 2015 – Room Experience (Melodic Rock Records)
- 2016 – Room Experience Japanese Edition (Anderstein Music)
- 2018 – Rehab – Firmo (Street Symphonies Records)
- 2018 – Rehab – Firmo – Japanese Edition (Anderstein Music)
- 2020 – Another Time And Place – Firmo – Japanese Edition (Anderstein Music)

=== Singles ===
- 2015 – I.F.O.R. – "We Still Rock" (D. Zublena – P. Monti – D. Barbieri – G. Firmo)

=== Various artists compilations ===
- MRCD13 – Peak Melodic 2015 (Melodic Rock Records)
- 2016 – We Still Rock – The compilation (Tanzan Music)
- 2026 – We Still Rock...The World – The compilation (Burning Minds Music Group)

=== Songwriting contribution ===
- 2017 – A World of Fools – Lionville (Frontiers Records)
- 2017 – Raintimes – Raintimes (Frontiers Records)
- 2019 – Begin Again – Wheels of Fire (Burning Minds Music Group)
- 2026 – We Still Rock...The World – The compilation (Burning Minds Music Group)
