= Sanctus Ignis =

Studio album by Adagio
- Released: 8 May 2001
- Recorded: 2001
- Genre: Progressive metal, symphonic metal, neoclassical metal
- Length: 54:34
- Label: Nothing to Say, Limb Music
- Producer: Dennis Ward

Adagio chronology
Sanctus Ignis (2001)	Underworld (2003)

Sanctus Ignis is the debut album by French progressive neoclassical metal band Adagio, released on 8 May 2001 in France by Nothing to Say and in Europe by Limb Music.

== Track listing ==
All lyrics are written by David Readman, except where noted; all music is composed by Stéphan Forté, except where noted.

No.	Title	Length
1.	"Second Sight" (L: Audrey Bedos)	6:07
2.	"The Inner Road"	5:45
3.	"In Nomine..."	5:04
4.	"The Stringless Violin"	7:00
5.	"Seven Lands of Sin" (L: Forté)	11:40
6.	"Order of Enlil" (instrumental)	4:19
7.	"Sanctus Ignis"	4:07
8.	"Panem et Circences" (L: Bedos)	5:21
9.	"Immigrant Song" (Led Zeppelin instrumental cover)	4:55

European edition
No.	Title	Length
10.	"Niflheim" (instrumental, 2000 demo)	4:05

Japanese edition
No.	Title	Length
10.	"Nozama" (instrumental, 2000 demo)	4:25
11.	"The Stringless Violin" (instrumental, 1999 demo)	5:15

== Reception ==
Professional ratings
Review scores
Source	Rating
AllMusic	4/5 stars
Lords of Metal	80/100
Metal Rules	4/5 stars
Metal Storm	9/10 stars
Metal Temple	8/10 stars
Satan Stole My Teddybear	(favorable)
Sea of Tranquility	4/5 stars

Sanctus Ignis was well received by critics. Gary Hill of AllMusic said "this is a superior album in the neo-classically tinged metal genre."

== Personnel ==
=== Adagio ===
- David Readman – vocals
- Stéphan Forté – guitar, keyboard
- Richard Andersson – keyboard
- Franck Hermanny – bass guitar
- Dirk Bruinenberg – drums

=== Production ===
- Dennis Ward – production, mixing, engineering
- Isabel De Amorim – artwork
- Marc Villalonga – photography
