= Close to the Sun (album) =

Studio album by Place Vendome
- Released: February 24, 2017
- Genre: Hard rock, AOR
- Length: 55:51
- Label: Frontiers
- Producer: Dennis Ward

Place Vendome chronology
Thunder in the Distance (2013)	Close to the Sun (2017)

Professional ratings
Review scores
Source	Rating
DangerDog	5/5 stars
Sea of Tranquility	4/5 stars
Heavy Paradise	4/5 stars

Close to the Sun is the fourth album of the melodic hard rock project Place Vendome. The songwriting for this album was provided by Magnus Karlsson (Primal Fear), Jani Liimatainen (Cain's Offering, ex-Sonata Arctica), Olaf Thörsen (Vision Divine, Labyrinth), Fabio Lione (Vision Divine, Angra, ex-Rhapsody of Fire), Simone Mularoni (DGM), Alessandro Del Vecchio (Hardline, Voodoo Circle), Aldo Lonobile (Secret Sphere) and Mike Palace (Palace).

This was the first Place Vendome album to feature guest guitar solos by Gus G (Firewind, Ozzy Osbourne), Kai Hansen (ex-Helloween, Gamma Ray, Unisonic), Mandy Meyer (Krokus, ex-Asia, Unisonic), Alfred Koffler (Pink Cream 69), Magnus Karlsson, Simone Mularoni and Michael Klein. It was released on 24 February 2017 with cover art credited to Stanis W. Decker.

== Track listing ==
No.	Title	Writer(s)	Length
1.	"Close to the Sun"	Simone Mularoni	4:32
2.	"Welcome to the Edge"	Jani Liimatainen	4:30
3.	"Hereafter" (DGM cover)	Mularoni	4:26
4.	"Strong"	Alessandro Del Vecchio	3:53
5.	"Across the Times"	Mularoni	4:51
6.	"Riding the Ghost"	Olaf Thörsen, Fabio Lione	3:57
7.	"Light Before the Dark"	Mike Palace	4:11
8.	"Falling Star"	Magnus Karlsson	4:50
9.	"Breathing"	Aldo Lonobile	4:43
10.	"Yesterday Is Gone"	Del Vecchio	4:33
11.	"Helen"	Thörsen, Lione	5:00
12.	"Distant Skies"	Lonobile	5:28
13.	"Strong" (orchestral version) (Japan bonus track)	Del Vecchio	3:19

== Personnel ==
=== Place Vendome ===
- Michael Kiske – vocals
- Dennis Ward – bass guitar, rhythm guitars, producer
- Dirk Bruinenberg – drums
- Gunther Werno – keyboards
- Uwe Reitenauer – rhythm guitars on "Close to the Sun", "Welcome to the Edge", "Hereafter", "Across the Times", lead guitars on "Close to the Sun"

=== Guest musicians ===
- Gus G (Firewind, Ozzy Osbourne) – guitar solo on "Light Before the Dark"
- Kai Hansen (Helloween, Gamma Ray, Unisonic) – guitar solo on "Riding the Ghost", "Across the Times"
- Magnus Karlsson (Primal Fear) – guitar solo on "Falling Star"
- Mandy Meyer (Krokus, ex-Asia, Unisonic) – guitar solo on "Helen"
- Alfred Koffler (Pink Cream 69) – guitar solo on "Welcome to the Edge"
- Simone Mularoni (DGM) – guitar solo on "Hereafter"
- Michael Klein – guitar solo on "Strong", "Breathing", "Yesterday Is Gone", "Distant Skies"
- Alessandro Del Vecchio – additional Choirs on "Strong"

== Charts ==
Chart (2017)	Peak position
Belgian Albums (Ultratop Wallonia)	155
Swiss Albums (Schweizer Hitparade)	60
