= Archangels in Black =

Studio album by Adagio
- Released: 2 February 2009
- Recorded: 2007–2008
- Genre: Symphonic metal, progressive metal, power metal
- Label: Listenable

Adagio chronology
Dominate (2005)	Archangels in Black (2009)	Life (2017)

Professional ratings
Review scores
Source	Rating
Metal Temple	7/10 stars

Archangels in Black is the fourth studio album by French progressive metal band Adagio. According to their website, the mastering of Archangels in Black was completed on 3 September 2008. After numerous delays, the album was officially released on 2 February 2009 in Europe. The band stated that "the compositions are the ultimate balance between melodic and extreme metal and can be considered as a more brutal version of Underworld". Archangels in Black is Adagio's first and only album to include Christian Palin on vocals, but the backing vocals were sung by Gustavo Monsanto, Adagio's former vocalist who sang on Dominate.

== Pre-release and production ==
The band entered the studio in October 2007, but they had to exit in order to do a tour. They re-entered the studio in December 2007.

On 13 October 2008, Adagio announced that the album would be released through the label Listenable Records.

On 24 October 2008, information about the album's artwork and its complete track listing was released. The cover artwork was done by Guilherme Sevens. The release date for Archangels in Black was also announced to be 2 February 2009.

A 3:58 video was released for "Fear Circus" in January 2009.

== Track listing ==
1. "Vamphyri" – 4:27
2. "The Astral Pathway" – 5:04
3. "Fear Circus" – 3:59
4. "Undead" – 4:41
5. "Archangels in Black" – 5:37
6. "The Fifth Ankh" – 4:43
7. "Codex Oscura" – 9:08
8. "Twilight at Dawn" – 6:24
9. "Getsu Senshi" – 3:42

== Personnel ==
- Stéphan Forté – guitars, vocals
- Franck Hermanny – bass
- Christian Palin – vocals
- Eric Lebailly – drums
- Kevin Codfert – keyboards

== Charts ==
Chart (2009)	Peak position
French Albums (SNEP)	181
