= Kosta Zafiriou =

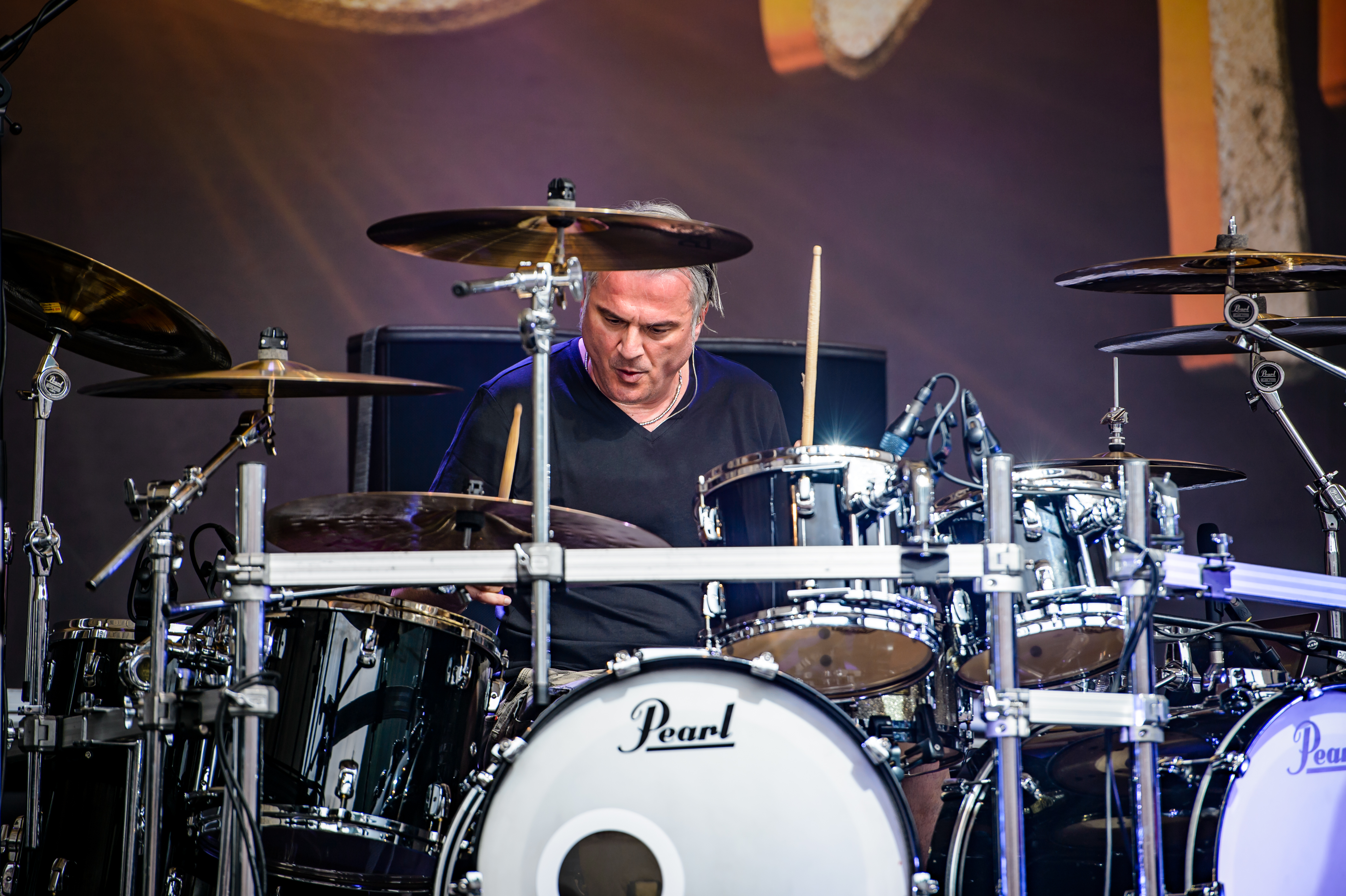
- Zafiriou in 2016

Background information
- Born: Kosta Zafiriou; 26 September 1966 (age 59); Zofingen, Switzerland
- Genres: Hard rock, heavy metal
- Instrument: Drums
- Years active: 1982–2016
- Formerly of: Pink Cream 69, Unisonic, Place Vendome

Kosta Zafiriou is a Swiss musician and music manager, one of the owners of Bottom Row Promotion company, which currently manages the bands Helloween, Axxis, Gotthard and Krokus. A former hard rock drummer, Zafiriou is known as one of the founding members of bands Pink Cream 69, Place Vendome and Unisonic.

== Biography ==
Zafiriou started to play drums at the age of 16. His first band was Redline, where he played with the guitarist Alfred Koffler, in 1982. Later in 1986 he joined the band Kymera where he played with vocalist Andi Deris. Kymera recorded two EPs with Zafiriou and Deris before they left to form the band Pink Cream 69 with guitarist Alfred Koffler and bassist Dennis Ward in 1987.

Zafiriou played with Pink Cream 69 from their debut album to their tenth In10sity before leaving the band in 2012.

Zafiriou and Pink Cream 69 bandmate Dennis Ward have also worked with two projects together with ex-Helloween vocalist Michael Kiske: Place Vendome, a melodic rock studio project created by the record company Frontiers Records, and Unisonic, a hard rock band managed by Zafiriou that released their first album and did the first world tour in 2012, also marking the first full collaboration by ex-Helloween members Michael Kiske and Kai Hansen in a band since Kai's departure from Helloween.

Zafiriou also recorded albums and played a few shows with bands Axxis, Krokus and with vocalist D. C. Cooper, as a drummer.

On 6 September 2016 Zafiriou announced his retirement as a professional drummer, remaining his job as music manager.

== Discography ==
=== with Pink Cream 69 ===
- 1989: Pink Cream 69
- 1991: One Size Fits All
- 1993: Games People Play
- 1995: Change
- 1997: Food for Thought
- 1998: Electrified
- 2000: Sonic Dynamite
- 2000: Mixery (EP)
- 2001: Endangered
- 2003: Live
- 2004: Thunderdome
- 2007: In10sity
- 2009: Live in Karlsruhe

=== with D.C. Cooper ===
- 1999: D.C. Cooper

=== with Axxis ===
- 2004: Time Machine
- 2011: 20 Years of Axxis

=== with Place Vendome ===
- 2005: Place Vendome
- 2009: Streets of Fire

=== with Unisonic ===
- 2012: Ignition (EP)
- 2012: Unisonic
- 2014: For the Kingdom (EP)
- 2014: Light of Dawn
- 2017: Live in Wacken

=== with Krokus ===
- 2013: Dirty Dynamite
