= Sonic Dynamite =

Studio album by Pink Cream 69
- Released: February 2, 2000
- Recorded: 2000
- Genre: Hard rock
- Length: 51:12 (54:04)
- Label: Massacre Records
- Producer: Dennis Ward

Pink Cream 69 chronology
Electrified (1998)	Sonic Dynamite (2000)	Mixery (2000)

Sonic Dynamite is the seventh album by German band Pink Cream 69.

== Track listing ==
All tracks are written by Alfred Koffler and David Readman

No.	Title	Length
1.	"Passage to Hope"	1:23
2.	"Seas of Madness"	5:14
3.	"Followed by the Moon"	4:37
4.	"Sonic Dynamite"	3:08
5.	"The Spirit"	4:38
6.	"Speed of Light"	4:43
7.	"Waiting for the Dawn"	4:45
8.	"Let the Thunder Reside"	5:06
9.	"Lost in Illusions"	4:10
10.	"Face of an Angel"	4:09
11.	"Shattered Prophecy"	3:48
12.	"Spread Your Wings"	5:00

Brazil Digi-pack Bonus Track
No.	Title	Length
13.	"Truth Hits Everybody" (The Police Cover)	2:56

== Personnel ==
- David Readman - vocals
- Alfred Koffler - guitar
- Dennis Ward - bass
- Kosta Zafiriou - drums

=== Guest Musicians ===
- Günther Werno - keyboards in "Passage to Hope", "The Spirit", "Let the Thunder Reside" and "Spread Your Wings".
