= A Band in Upperworld =

Live album by Adagio
- Released: 24 June 2004
- Recorded: at the Elysée Montmartre in Paris on 17 February 2004
- Genres: Neoclassical metal, progressive metal
- Length: 62:29

Adagio chronology
| Underworld (2003) | A Band in Upperworld (2004) | Dominate (2005) |

A Band in Upperworld is the first live album and the third release by French progressive metal band Adagio.

== Track listing ==
1. "Introitus" – 1:22
2. "Second Sight" – 6:07
3. "Chosen" – 8:43
4. "The Stringless Violin" – 6:32
5. "From My Sleep... to Someone Else" – 7:47
6. "Promises" – 5:14
7. "The Seven Lands of Sin" – 14:02
8. "Panem et Circences" (Japanese edition bonus track) – 6:18
9. "In Nomine..." – 6:24

== Personnel ==
- Kevin Codfert – keyboard
- Stéphan Forté – guitar
- Franck Hermanny – bass
- Eric Lebailles – drums
- David Readman – vocals
