= Thunderdome (album) =

Album by Pink Cream 69

Studio album by Pink Cream 69
- Released: 8 June 2004
- Genre: Hard rock
- Length: 59:26
- Label: SPV/Steamhammer
- Producer: Dennis Ward

Pink Cream 69 chronology
Endangered (2001)	Thunderdome (2004)	In10sity (2007)

Thunderdome is the ninth studio album by German hard rock band Pink Cream 69.

== Track listing ==
No.	Title	Lyrics	Music	Length
1.	"The Last Stance"	Intro	Intro	0:57
2.	"Thunderdome"	Dennis Ward	Ward	4:26
3.	"Gods Come Together"	Ward	Alfred Koffler	4:46
4.	"Carnaby Road"	Ward, David Readman	Koffler	4:50
5.	"Here I Am"	Readman	Readman, Ward	4:58
6.	"That Was Yesterday"	Readman	Readman	4:45
7.	"Shelter"	Ward	Ward	4:48
8.	"Retro Lullaby"	Ward	Koffler	4:02
9.	"My Sharona"	Doug Fieger	Berton Averre, Fieger	4:21
10.	"As Deep As I Am"	Ward	Ward	5:33
11.	"Another Wrong Makes Right"	Ward	Koffler, Ward	5:05
12.	"See Your Face"	Ward	Koffler	4:01
13.	"Carved In Stone"	Readman	Readman	3:34
14.	"The Edge Of Sorrow (Japanese bonus track)"			3:46

- European version (SPV Records 085–69442) omits tracks 13 & 14.
- Limited edition digipack (SPV Records 087–69440) omits track 14.
- Track 9 originally recorded by The Knack on the album Get the Knack.

== Personnel ==
- David Readman – vocals
- Alfred Koffler – guitar
- Dennis Ward – bass guitar
- Kosta Zafiriou – drums
- Gunther Werno – keyboards (tracks 6 & 12)

== Production ==
- Mixing – Dennis Ward
- Engineer – Dennis Ward
