= Christian Palin =

Finnish-Uruguayan singer

Christian Palin (born 1 February 1978) is a Finnish-Uruguayan singer. He is the lead singer of the metal bands Random Eyes and Panorama. He is also the former lead singer of the neoclassical metal band Adagio, among others.

The son of a Finnish father and Uruguayan mother, Palin was born in Montevideo, Uruguay. He moved to Finland with his family in 1998 and in 1999 served his 12-month mandatory military service in Tikkakoski as a corporal.

Palin signed with Adagio in 2008, and Archangels in Black was the first album to feature him on vocals. He parted ways with the band in February 2010.

== Discography ==
Date	Artist	Album title	Notes
2003	Random Eyes	Eyes Ablaze	Lead vocals
2006	Stoner Kings	Fuck the World	Backing vocals (guest)
2007	Essence of Sorrow	Reflections of the Obscure	Lead vocals
2007	Kotipelto	Sleep Well	Writer
2008	Deuteronomium	From the Midst of the Battle	Backing vocals (guest)
2008	Random Eyes	Invisible	Lead vocals
2009	Adagio	Archangels in Black	Lead vocals
2010	Epicrenel	The Crystal Throne	Lead vocals
2011	Random Eyes	Light Up	Lead vocals
2013	Epicrenel	The Crystal Throne	Lead vocals
2013	Desyre	Glamtron	Guest vocals
2015	Magic Kingdom	Savage Requiem	Lead vocals
2017	Aldaria	Land of Light	Guest appearance
2018	Panorama	Around the World	Lead vocals, lyrics
2018	Random Eyes	Grieve no More	Lead vocals, lyrics, music
