= Paradise in Flames =

Studio album by Axxis
- Released: 20 January 2006
- Genre: Power metal
- Length: 49:11
- Label: AFM Records

Axxis chronology
Time Machine (2004)	Paradise in Flames (2006)	Doom of Destiny (2007)

Professional ratings
Review scores
Source	Rating
Scream Magazine	5/6 stars
Rock Hard	8.5/10 stars
Noise.fi	2/5 stars
Heavymetal.dk	
Exact	3/6 stars
Powermetal.de	

Paradise In Flames, released in 2006, is the tenth full-length album by the German power metal band Axxis.

It entered the German album charts at #45 on 3 February 2006, only lasting for that one week.

== Tracklist ==
1. "Paradise in Flames (Intro)" - 1:15
2. "Dance with the Dead" - 4:40
3. "Tales of Glory Island" - 4:46
4. "Take my Hand" - 5:06
5. "Will God remember me?" - 4:46
6. "Talisman" - 4:25
7. "Don't leave me" - 3:34
8. "Lady Moon" - 4:32
9. "Icewind" - 4:12
10. "Stay by me" - 4:01
11. "Gods of Rain" - 3:41
12. "Passion for Rock" - 4:02
13. "Break your Soul" - 4:15 [bonus track]
14. "Tales of Glory Island (long version)" - 5:38 [bonus track]
