= In10sity =

Studio album by Pink Cream 69
- Released: 23 March 2007
- Recorded: 2007
- Genre: Hard rock
- Length: 59:11
- Label: Frontiers Records
- Producer: Dennis Ward

Pink Cream 69 chronology
Thunderdome (2004)	In10sity (2007)	Ceremonial (2013)

In10sity is the tenth studio album by Pink Cream 69. It is the first album to feature additional guitarist Uwe Reitenauer and also celebrates the band's 20th year making music. It was released in 2007.

== Track listing ==
All tracks are written by Alfred Koffler and Dennis Ward, except where noted.

No.	Title	Writer(s)	Length
1.	"Children of the Dawn"		5:54
2.	"No Way Out"		4:11
3.	"Crossfire"		4:28
4.	"I’m Not Afraid"	David Readman, Uwe Reitenauer	4:46
5.	"A New Religion"		4:37
6.	"The Hour of Freedom"	Readman	4:57
7.	"Stop This Madness"		5:31
8.	"Desert Land"		1:27
9.	"Out of This World"		5:21
10.	"It’s Just a State of Mind"	Koffler, Readman	4:34
11.	"Wanna Hear You Rock"	Readman, Reitenauer	3:59
12.	"My Darkest Hour"		4:38
13.	"Last Train to Nowhere"		4:48

Japanese Bonus Track
No.	Title	Length
12.	"Slave to What I Crave"	3:37

- Only on the Japanese release, track 12 "My Darkest Hour" is replaced with "Slave to What I Crave."

== Personnel ==
=== Band members ===
- David Readman - vocals
- Alfred Koffler - guitar, keyboards
- Uwe Reitenauer - guitar
- Dennis Ward - bass guitar, keyboards, backing vocals, producer, engineer, mixing
- Kosta Zafiriou - drums
