= Thunder in the Distance =

Studio album by Place Vendome
- Released: November 1, 2013
- Genre: Hard rock
- Length: 53:52
- Label: Frontiers
- Producer: Dennis Ward

Place Vendome chronology
Streets of Fire (2009)	Thunder in the Distance (2013)	Close to the Sun (2017)

Professional ratings
Review scores
Source	Rating
Jukebox:Metal	3.5/5 stars
Melodic	3.5/5 stars
Power of Metal	9/10 stars
Sea of Tranquility	8/10 stars

Thunder in the Distance is the third album of the melodic hard rock project Place Vendome. The songwriting for this album was provided by Timo Tolkki (ex-Stratovarius), Magnus Karlsson (Primal Fear), Alessandro Del Vecchio (Hardline), Brett Jones, Tommy Denander (Radioactive), Sören Kronqvist (Sunstorm), Roberto Tiranti and Andrea Cantarelli (Labyrinth).

A music video was filmed for the song "Talk To Me on YouTube".

It was released on 1 November 2013 with cover art credited to Stanis W. Decker.

== Track listing ==
No.	Title	Writer(s)	Length
1.	"Talk to Me"	Alessandro Del Vecchio	4:03
2.	"Power of Music"	Del Vecchio	4:03
3.	"Broken Wings"	Brett Jones	4:20
4.	"Lost in Paradise"	Timo Tolkki	3:53
5.	"It Can't Rain Forever"	Camilla Andersson, Sören Kronqvist, Thomas Vikström	4:05
6.	"Fragile Ground"	Jones	4:10
7.	"Hold Your Love"	Del Vecchio	4:35
8.	"Never Too Late"	Del Vecchio	3:30
9.	"Heaven Lost"	Del Vecchio, Carmine Martone	4:40
10.	"My Heart Is Dying"	Tommy Denander, Nina Söderqvist	3:07
11.	"Break Out"	Magnus Karlsson	4:34
12.	"Maybe Tomorrow"	Andrea Cantarelli, Roberto Tiranti	4:24
13.	"Thunder in the Distance"	Del Vecchio	4:28
14.	"Maybe Tomorrow" (Orchestral Version)	Cantarelli, Tiranti	2:40

== Credits ==
=== Band members ===
- Michael Kiske – vocals
- Uwe Reitenauer – guitars
- Dennis Ward – bass guitar, producer
- Dirk Bruinenberg – drums
- Gunther Werno – keyboards
