= D. C. Cooper (album) =

Studio album by D. C. Cooper
- Released: 1998
- Genre: Hard rock
- Length: 53:10
- Label: CNR Music; InsideOut
- Producer: Dennis Ward

Professional ratings
Review scores
| Source | Rating |
|---|---|
| Allmusic | 3/5 stars |

D. C. Cooper is the debut studio album released by D. C. Cooper.

== Track listing ==
All songs written by D. C. Cooper/Alfred Koffler except where noted.

1. "Dream" – 3:52
2. "Easy Livin'" – 2:35 (Ken Hensley)
3. "The Angel Comes" – 5:32 (Cooper/Tore Ostby)
4. "Until the End" – 4:40 (Cooper/Ostby)
5. "Within Yourself" – 3:40
6. "Three Generations" – 4:26 (Cooper/Ostby)
7. "Chained" (Instrumental) – 1:31 (Gunter Werno)
8. "Freedom" – 6:18
9. "Take Me In" – 3:49
10. "Forgive Me" – 3:39
11. "Whisper" – 4:11
12. "The Union" – 8:57 (Cooper/Ostby)

Track 2 originally recorded by Uriah Heep on the album Demons and Wizards.

== Credits ==
- D. C. Cooper – vocals and backing vocals
- Alfred Koffler – guitars
- Tore Østby – guitars
- Dennis Ward – bass guitar and backing vocals
- Kosta Zafiriou – drums
- Gunter Werno – keyboards
- Sandy Campos – backing vocals
- David Readman – backing vocals
- Caroline Wolf – backing vocals

== Production ==
- Assistant Producer – Kosta Zafiriou
- Mixing – Dennis Ward
- Engineer – Dennis Ward
