= Luca Turilli's Rhapsody =

Italian metal band

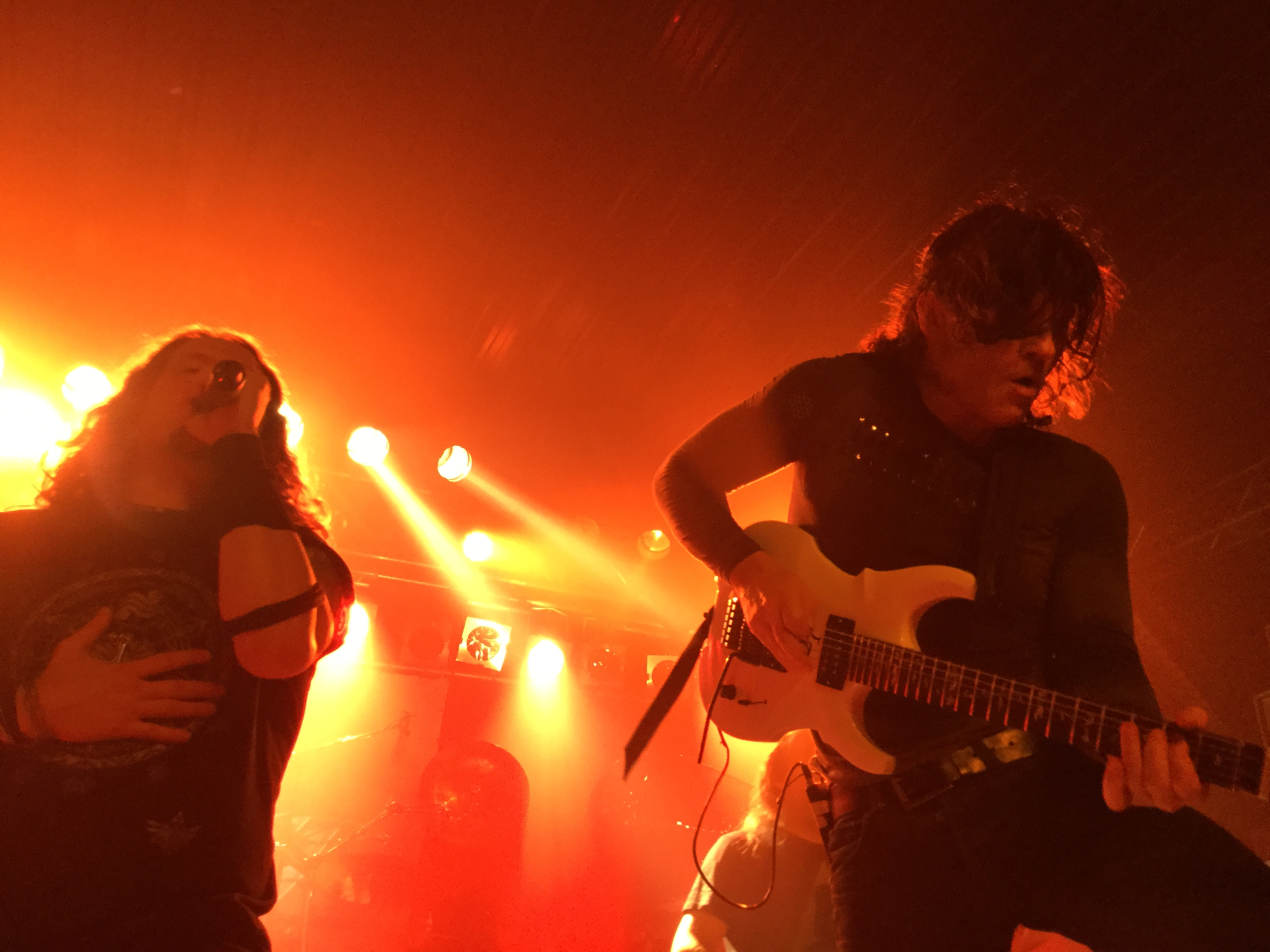
- Luca Turilli's Rhapsody in München in 2016, with Alessandro Conti (left) and Luca Turilli.

Background information
- Origin: Trieste, Italy
- Genres: Symphonic power metal
- Years active: 2011–2018
- Labels: Nuclear Blast
- Past members: Luca Turilli; Alessandro Conti; Dominique Leurquin; Patrice Guers; Alex Holzwarth; Alex Landenburg
- Website: www.ltrhapsody.com

Luca Turilli's Rhapsody (often simply referred by itself as Rhapsody, LT's Rhapsody or Turilli's Rhapsody) was an Italian symphonic power metal band created and led by Luca Turilli after his split from Rhapsody of Fire, also including German, French and Finnish members. Although the band and its material is considered symphonic power metal, the band members referred their style as "Cinematic metal" to underline Luca Turilli's passion for the world of cinema and the soundtracks, yet the main influence of his new artistic proposal.

In 2011, Rhapsody of Fire announced its friendly split into two Rhapsody bands: Alex Staropoli and Fabio Lione decided to go on as Rhapsody of Fire while Turilli, along with bassist Patrice Guers and session guitarist Dominique Leurquin decided to move on as Luca Turilli's Rhapsody. The band's first line-up also included singer Alessandro Conti and Rhapsody of Fire drummer Alex Holzwarth, who was then a member of both bands. However, in 2012 Holzwarth left due to the impossibility to be fully in both bands, and was replaced by Alex Landenburg. Their first album, Ascending to Infinity, was released in 2012 and is referred to as their own "Rhapsody's 11th album". Their second and final album, Prometheus, Symphonia Ignis Divinus, was released in 2015.

From April 2017 to March 2018, Turilli, Leurquin, Guers, Holzwarth, and former Rhapsody of Fire vocalist Lione toured together for the 20th Anniversary Farewell Tour, playing the music of the original band; in June 2018, Turilli confirmed that the band was inactive, and the following December announced that the 20th Anniversary Farewell Tour lineup now formed a new band, named Turilli / Lione Rhapsody.

== History ==
On August 16, 2011, Rhapsody of Fire announced the friendly departure of long-time guitarist, songwriter, and founding member Luca Turilli and bassist Patrice Guers. Following his departure, Turilli founded his new Rhapsody band, Luca Turilli's Rhapsody, with Guers, his friend and former Rhapsody of Fire session and live guitarist Dominique Leurquin, an unspecified new lead singer and Rhapsody of Fire drummer Alex Holzwarth who became a member of both bands. On January 30, 2012, the band announced their first album, Ascending to Infinity.

On March 30, 2012, the band finally revealed their new singer, Alessandro Conti. In 2012, Holzwarth left the band due to the impossibility to be fully in both bands. Following his departure, the band announced his new drummer, former Annihilator, Axxis and Stratovarius member Alex Landenburg.

On May 22, 2012, the first single from the upcoming album Ascending to Infinity, titled "Dark Fate of Atlantis" was released with a music video. On June 22, 2012, the new album was released. The band then started its "Cinematic World Tour".

On October 8, 2012, the band revealed that Leurquin seriously injured his left hand with a circular saw, almost losing it: "After the complicated surgery and everyone around thinking it will be difficult for Dominique to play his beloved instrument once again, the doctors spent some more optimistic words to describe the situation, speaking about a long period of rehabilitation and some major problems eventually related to the thumb only. Therefore it seems there will be again the possibility for Dominique to play a guitar, and maybe sooner than what can be expected." The injury made it impossible for Leurquin to be a part of the band for almost two years; instead of replacing him with another guitarist for the upcoming Ascending to Infinity Tour, Turilli arranged all the songs to add Leurquin's parts on the backing tracks at lower volume. His return was eventually announced on August 9, 2014, with the band's concert at the Made of Metal Festival on August 15 being his first show with the band.

On 23 March 2015, Nuclear Blast announced Prometheus: Symphonia Ignis Divinus for release on June 19 in the EU, June 22 in the UK and June 30 in the US. The following year after release, they went on their first world tour in starting in Europe in early 2016. They co-headlined with Primal Fear in North America and South America in support of the album.

On September 30, the band announced on the website and Facebook that they would release their new album remixed in Dolby Atmos and on Blu-Ray with two live CDs from performances they had played on their Ascending to Infinity Tour and Prometheus Cinematic World Tour. It was released on December 9, 2016.

On June 20, 2018, Turilli had announced on the band's official Facebook page that the band would be going on an indefinite hiatus, due to the other members' commitments to other musical projects, such as vocalist Alessandro Conti who was announced as the new vocalist for Swedish symphonic power metal band Twilight Force earlier that month and drummer Alex Landenburg who was later confirmed as the new drummer for the American power metal band Kamelot on April 10, 2019.

== Band members ==
Final lineup

- Alessandro Conti – lead vocals (2011–2018)
- Luca Turilli – lead and rhythm guitar, keyboards (2011–2018)
- Dominique Leurquin – lead and rhythm guitar (2011–2018)
- Patrice Guers – bass (2011–2018)
- Alex Landenburg – drums (2012–2018)

Former

- Alex Holzwarth – drums (2011–2012)

Live

- Mikko Härkin – keyboards (2012–2014)

== Discography ==
=== Studio albums ===
- Ascending to Infinity (2012)
- Prometheus, Symphonia Ignis Divinus (2015)

=== Live albums ===
- Prometheus - The Dolby ATMOS Experience + Cinematic and Live (2016)

=== Singles ===
- "Dark Fate of Atlantis" (2012)
- "Rosenkreuz (The Rose and The Cross)" (2015)
- "Prometheus" (2015)
- "Il cigno nero (Reloaded)" (2015)

=== Music Videos ===
- "Dark Fate of Atlantis"
- "Clash of the Titans"
- "Prometheus"
- "Il cigno nero [Reloaded]"
