= One Size Fits All (Pink Cream 69 album) =

Studio album by Pink Cream 69
- Released: 25 February 1991
- Recorded: Soundhaus Studio, Hamburg, Germany, August–November 1990
- Genre: Heavy metal, glam metal, hard rock, power Metal
- Length: 41:18
- Label: Epic
- Producer: Dirk Steffens

Pink Cream 69 chronology
Pink Cream 69 (1989)	One Size Fits All (1991)	Games People Play (1993)

Professional ratings
Review scores
Source	Rating
Allmusic	3/5 stars

One Size Fits All is the second studio album by Pink Cream 69, released in 1991.

When Andi Deris joined Helloween, he began playing the song "Where the Eagle Learns to Fly" live on many occasions.

== Track listing ==
No.	Title	Lyrics	Music	Length
1.	"Livin' My Life for You"	Andi Deris	Deris	4:00
2.	"Talk to the Moon"	Deris	Deris, Alfred Koffler	4:43
3.	"Hell's Gone Crazy"	Deris	Deris	4:29
4.	"Do You Like It Like That"	Deris	Deris, Dennis Ward	4:04
5.	"Ballerina"	Deris	Deris	3:38
6.	"Signs of Danger"	Deris	Deris, Koffler	3:58
7.	"Walkin' Out to Heaven"	Deris, Ward	Deris, Koffler, Ward	4:16
8.	"Stray Kid"	Deris	Deris	3:58
9.	"Piggy Back Bitch"	Deris, Ward	Ward	3:39
10.	"Where the Eagle Learns to Fly"	Deris	Deris	4:33

=== CD edition bonus track ===
No.	Title	Lyrics	Music	Length
11.	"We Taught the Children"	Deris	Deris	3:57

== Singles ==
Ballerina

1. "Ballerina"
2. "Signs of Danger"
3. "White Men Do No Reggae (live)

Do You Like It Like That

1. "Do You Like It Like That" (edit)
2. "Ballerina"
3. "Hell's Gone Crazy"

== Personnel ==
- Andi Deris - vocals
- Alfred Koffler - guitar
- Dennis Ward - bass
- Kosta Zafiriou - drums
