= Change (Pink Cream 69 album) =

Studio album by Pink Cream 69
- Released: 20 March 1995
- Recorded: November–December 1994, Los Angeles, USA
- Genre: Grunge, alternative metal
- Length: 48:24
- Label: Epic
- Producer: Shay Baby, Pink Cream 69

Pink Cream 69 chronology
Games People Play (1993)	Change (1995)	Food for Thought (1997)

Professional ratings
Review scores
Source	Rating
Allmusic	3.5/5 stars

Change is the fourth album by German hard rock group Pink Cream 69, released in 1995. It was the first album with current singer David Readman, after Andi Deris left the band to join German power metal band Helloween.

== Track listing ==
All tracks are written by Pink Cream 69, except where noted

No.	Title	Writer(s)	Length
1.	"Funny Words"		4:37
2.	"Light of Day"		3:36
3.	"Change"		4:16
4.	"Yesterdays"		4:10
5.	"Two Hours"		3:51
6.	"Something I Said"		3:18
7.	"Only the Good"		3:51
8.	"20th Century Boy" (T. Rex cover)	Marc Bolan	3:25
9.	"Queen Bee"		4:36
10.	"Stretch the Truth"		4:05
11.	"New Control"		4:01
12.	"Freakshow"		4:38

== Personnel ==
- David Readman – vocals
- Alfred Koffler – guitar
- Dennis Ward – bass guitar
- Kosta Zafiriou – drums

== Guest Members ==
- David A. – keyboards
- Bateke – percussion*

== Production ==
- Mixing – Shay Baby and Eric Greedy
- Engineer – Shay Baby and Bill Cooper
- Assistant Engineer – Matt Westfield
