= The Big Thrill =

Studio album by Axxis
- Released: March 4, 1993
- Recorded: Kajem Recordings, Gladwyne, Pennsylvania, US
- Genre: Hard rock
- Length: 50:31
- Label: EMI
- Producer: Joey Balin

Axxis chronology
Axxis II (1990)	The Big Thrill (1993)	Matters of Survival (1995)

The Big Thrill, released in 1993, is the third full-length album by the German hard rock band Axxis. It was recorded in the United States with producer Joey Balin (Warlock, Doro).

== Track listing ==
1. "Better World / Livin' in the Dark" (M: B. Weiß; L: W. Pietsch / M: W. Pietsch; L: B. Weiß) - 4:21
2. "Against a Brick Wall" (M: B. Weiß, W. Pietsch; L: W. Pietsch) - 3:55
3. "Stay Don't Leave Me" (M: B. Weiß, H. Oellers, W. Pietsch; L: J. Balin) - 4:11
4. "Little War" (M: W. Pietsch, H. Oellers, B. Weiß; L: B. Weiß) - 4:22
5. "No Advice" (M: W. Pietsch, B. Weiß; L: J. Balin) - 3:35
6. "Love Doesn't Know Any Distance" (M: B. Weiß, W. Pietsch; L: B. Weiß) - 4:56
7. "Heaven's 7th Train" (M: B. Weiß, H. Oellers, W. Pietsch; L: W. Pietsch) - 5:49
8. "Brother Moon" (M: W. Pietsch, H. Oellers; L: W. Pietsch) - 4:52
9. "Waterdrop" (M+L: B. Weiß) - 5:33
10. "The Wolf" (M: W. Pietsch, B. Weiß; L: B. Weiß) - 4:45
11. "Road to Never Neverland" (M: H. Oellers, B. Weiß, W. Pietsch; L: B. Weiß) - 4:21

== Personnel ==
- Bernhard Weiß - vocals, guitars
- Walter Pietsch - guitars
- Werner Kleinhans - bass
- Richard Michalski - drums
- Harry Öllers - keyboards
