= Life (Adagio album) =

Studio album by Adagio
- Released: 29 May 2017
- Recorded: 5 June – 18 October 2016
- Studio: Axone Studio, Montreuil, France
- Genre: Progressive metal; symphonic metal; neoclassical metal
- Length: 56:17
- Label: Zeta Nemesis
- Producer: Stéphan Forté

Adagio chronology
Archangels in Black (2009)	Life (2017)

Professional ratings
Review scores
Source	Rating
Power of Metal	7/10 stars
My Global Mind	8/10 stars
Louder Sound	4.5/5 stars

Life is the fifth album by French neoclassical metal band Adagio, released on 29 May 2017 in France under Zeta Nemesis Records label and 9 August 2017 in Japan by King Records.

The album fundings were raised after a crowdfunding campaign on IndieGogo collected €27,533. It was recorded at Axone Studio in Montreuil, mixed at X-Fade Studios, Nanterre, and mastered at Tower Studio in Montpellier from 5 June to 18 October 2016.

== Track listing ==
All lyrics are written by Kelly Sundown Carpenter and Stéphan Forté; all music is composed by Stéphan Forté and Mayline Gautié.

No.	Title	Length
1.	"Life"	9:10
2.	"The Ladder"	6:22
3.	"Subrahmanya"	6:54
4.	"The Grand Spring Voyage"	6:05
5.	"Darkness Machine"	5:42
6.	"I'll Possess You"	5:47
7.	"Secluded Within Myself"	5:49
8.	"Trippin' Away"	5:52
9.	"Torn"	4:36
Total length:		56:17

Japanese version
No.	Title	Length
10.	"Carry the Cross" (demo)	4:11
Total length:		1:00:28

== Personnel ==
=== Adagio ===
- Kelly Sundown Carpenter – vocals
- Stéphan Forté – guitar
- Kevin Codfert – keyboard
- Franck Hermanny – bass guitar
- Jelly Cardarelli – drums
- Mayline Gautié – violin

=== Additional musicians ===
- Carl Bensley – additional growling vocals

=== Production ===
- Stéphan Forté – producer
- Kevin Codfert – mixing
- Brett Caldas-Lima – mastering
- Ludovic Cordelières – artwork
- Lulu Inthesky – artwork
- Martial Lenoir – photography
