= Kingdom of the Night =

Studio album by Axxis
- Released: 1989
- Recorded: 1988
- Studio: EMI Studio Cologne
- Genre: Heavy metal
- Length: 45:34
- Label: EMI
- Producer: Rolf Hanekamp, Bernhard Weiss, Walter Pietsch

Axxis chronology
Kingdom of the Night (1989)	Axxis II (1990)

Professional ratings
Review scores
Source	Rating
AllMusic	3/5 stars
Rock Hard	7/10 stars

Kingdom of the Night is the debut album by Axxis, released in 1989.

It spent 12 weeks on the German album charts from April to June 1989, peaking at #42.

== Track listing ==
All songs by Bernhard Weiß and Walter Pietsch

1. "Living in a World" - 3:53
2. "Kingdom of the Night" - 3:50
3. "Never Say Never" - 3:41
4. "Fire and Ice" - 4:00
5. "Young Souls" - 3:16
6. "Singing for a Song" - 4:03
7. "Love Is Like an Ocean" - 3:24
8. "The Moon" - 3:40
9. "Tears of the Trees" - 4:10
10. "Just One Night" - 3:13
11. "Kings Made of Steel" - 3:32
12. "Living in a World (Extended Version)" - 5:08

== Personnel ==
- Bernhard Weiss – vocals, guitars
- Walter Pietsch – vocals, guitars
- Tobias Becker – keyboards
- Werner Kleinhans – bass
- Richard Michalski – drums, backing vocals

With additional vocals by Ava Cimiotti and Frank Pieper.
