= Streets of Fire (Place Vendome album) =

Studio album by Place Vendome
- Released: February 20, 2009
- Recorded: Piranha Studios, Karlsdorf and The Track Shack, Germany
- Genres: Hard rock, AOR
- Length: 52:56
- Label: Frontiers
- Producer: Dennis Ward

Place Vendome chronology
Place Vendome (2005)	Streets of Fire (2009)	Thunder in the Distance (2013)

Professional ratings
Review scores
Source	Rating
Heavy Paradise	9.5/10 stars
Metal Express Radio	9.5/10 stars
Metal Temple	8/10 stars

Streets of Fire is the second album of the hard rock project Place Vendome. The songwriting for this album was provided by Torsti Spoof (Leverage), Ronny Milianowicz (Saint Deamon), Robert Säll (Work of Art) and Magnus Karlsson (Primal Fear).

A music video was filmed for the song My Guardian Angel on YouTube, marking the visual return of vocalist Michael Kiske since 1996.

It was released on 20 February 2009 with cover art credited to Carl André Beckston.

== Track listing ==
No.	Title	Writer(s)	Length
1.	"Streets of Fire"	Torsti Spoof/Tuomas Heikkinen	5:52
2.	"My Guardian Angel"	Magnus Karlsson	4:57
3.	"Completely Breathless"	Johan Fransson/Ronny Milianowicz/Tim Larsson/Tobias Lundgren	3:16
4.	"Follow Me"	Robert Säll	3:51
5.	"Set Me Free" (Casting Crowns cover)	Mark Hall/Bernie Herms	4:30
6.	"Believer"	Spoof/Pekka Heino	4:36
7.	"Valerie (The Truth Is in Your Eyes)"	Säll	3:42
8.	"A Scene in Replay"	Millianowicz/Andreas Johansson/Jan Thore Grefstad	4:44
9.	"Changes"	Spoof/Heino	4:31
10.	"Surrender Your Soul"	Milianowicz/Johansson/Joacim Cans/Thomas Ohlsson	3:42
11.	"Dancer"	Spoof/Heikkinen	4:22
12.	"I'd Die for You" (Soleil Moon cover)	Larry King/Sandy Forman	5:00

=== Japanese Bonus Track ===
No.	Title	Writer(s)	Length
13.	"My Guardian Angel" (acoustic version)	Karlsson	3:38

== Credits ==
=== Band members ===
- Michael Kiske – vocals
- Uwe Reitenauer – guitars
- Dennis Ward – bass guitar, producer, engineer, mixing, mastering
- Kosta Zafiriou – drums
- Gunther Werno - keyboards
