= Mixery =

EP by Pink Cream 69
- Released: 11 November 2000
- Recorded: Various locations, 1999–2000
- Genre: Hard rock, glam metal
- Length: 22:57
- Label: Massacre
- Producer: Dennis Ward

Pink Cream 69 chronology
Sonic Dynamite (1999)	Mixery (2000)	Endangered (2001)

Mixery is an EP by the German hard rock band Pink Cream 69 containing rare, live, acoustic and re-recorded tracks.

== Track listing ==
No.	Title	Length
1.	"One Step into Paradise" (Version 2000)	3:52
2.	"Seas of Madness" (Acoustic Version)	4:58
3.	"King of My World" (Version 2000)	3:43
4.	"Looks That Kill" (Mötley Crüe cover)	4:16
5.	"Shame" (Live)	5:02
6.	"Break the Silence" (Live)	4:04

=== Album notes ===
- "King of My World" recorded during the sessions for Sonic Dynamite.
- "Shame" & "Break the Silence" were recorded live at Club Citta, Kawasaki, Japan on 6 March 1999. They are raw live versions, recorded by a bootlegger and taken away from him by security.
- "Looks That Kill" was originally recorded for the Mötley Crüe Tribute Sampler "Kickstart My Heart".

== Personnel ==
- David Readman – vocals
- Alfred Koffler – guitar
- Dennis Ward – bass
- Kosta Zafiriou – drums

=== Guest musicians ===
- Günter Werno – keyboards ("Seas of Madness")
