= Electrified (Pink Cream 69 album) =

Studio album by Pink Cream 69
- Released: 18 March 1998
- Genre: Hard rock, Heavy Metal
- Label: High Gain, Massacre Records, SPV, Victor Records, Moria Records, Digital Dimension
- Producer: Dennis Ward

Pink Cream 69 chronology
Food for Thought (1997)	Electrified (1998)	Sonic Dynamite (2000)

Electrified is the sixth album by German hard rock group Pink Cream 69, released in 1998. It features guest appearances of singers D.C. Cooper of (Royal Hunt) and Ralf Scheepers of (Primal Fear) on the song Over The Fire.

== Track listing ==
All tracks are written by Pink Cream 69

No.	Title	Length
1.	"Shame"	4:46
2.	"Stranger in Time"	5:41
3.	"Break the Silence"	3:53
4.	"Electrified"	3:28
5.	"Over the Fire"	4:24
6.	"Losing My Faith"	5:04
7.	"Higher Kind of Life"	3:52
8.	"Burn Your Soul"	3:37
9.	"Rocket Ride"	4:52
10.	"Best for You"	3:46
11.	"Gone Again"	4:31

Japanese Version Bonus Track
No.	Title	Length
12.	"Always Love You"	3:39

Brazilian Version Bonus Tracks
No.	Title	Length
12.	"Always Love You"	3:39
13.	"One Time Is Not Enough"	4:33
14.	"Queen of Sorrow"	3:54
15.	"Gone Again (Special Version)"	4:31
16.	"Shame - Videoclip"	4:46

Unreleased Demo SPV Re-Release 2005
No.	Title	Length
12.	"Queen of Sorrow"	3:54
13.	"Gone Again (Special Version)"	4:31
14.	"Shame - Videoclip"	4:46

== Personnel ==
- David Readman – vocals
- Alfred Koffler – guitar
- Dennis Ward – bass guitar
- Kosta Zafiriou – drums

Guest Musicians:

- Sandy Campos (backing vocals) - Gone Again
- D.C. Cooper (vocals) - Over The Fire
- Ralf Scheepers (vocals) - Over The Fire

Additional Information:

- Includes a second version of "Gone Again" as "hidden track"
- Released in the USA as "PC69" with different front cover
- Brazilian release with complete redesigned booklet
- SPV Re-Release 2005, Booklet: with additional photos and linernotes from Dennis Ward
