= Utopia (Axxis album) =

Studio album by Axxis
- Released: 2009
- Recorded: 2009
- Studio: SOUNDWORXX Studio, Germany
- Genre: Power metal, Electronic rock
- Length: 49:30
- Label: AFM Records
- Producer: B.Weiss, H.Oellers

Axxis chronology
Doom of Destiny (2007)	Utopia (2009)	reDISCOver(ed) (2012)

Utopia, released in 2009, is the twelfth full-length album by the German power metal band Axxis.

It entered the German album charts at #40 on 11 September 2009, only lasting for that one week.

== Critical reception ==
Professional ratings
Review scores
Source	Rating
Kerrang!	3/5 stars
Rock Hard	7/10 stars
Allmusic	3.5/5 stars
Blabbermouth	8/10 stars
Metal.de	7/10 stars
Vampster	

"Twenty years in the business is a long time for any band, especially for the one that awkwardly straddles two genres. Axxis play soft focus power metal that edges on the progressive rock, the massive use of keyboards and Bernhardt Weiss' clean, high-pitched tones being particularly redolent of the latter," writes Kerrang!. "Utopia may well be the clearest and most accessible distillation of what Axxis do," opines reviewer Steve Beebee, giving the album 3 out of 5Ks rating.

== Track listing ==
1. "Journey to Utopia" – 1:39
2. "Utopia" – 3:59
3. "Last Man on Earth" – 4:51
4. "Fass Mich An" – 5:10
5. "Sarah Wanna Die" – 5:54
6. "My Father's Eyes" – 4:40
7. "The Monsters Crawl" – 4:44
8. "Eyes of a Child" – 4:32
9. "Heavy Rain" – 4:32
10. "For You I Will Die" – 5:30
11. "Underworld" – 3:56

=== Bonus Tracks ===
1. "Taste My Blood"
2. "20 Years Anniversary Song"
