= Pink Cream 69 (album) =

Studio album by Pink Cream 69
- Released: 2 October 1989
- Recorded: May–August 1989
- Studio: Soundhaus Studio, Hamburg, Germany
- Genre: Glam metal New wave
- Length: 38:52
- Label: Epic
- Producer: Dirk Steffens

Pink Cream 69 chronology
Pink Cream 69 (1989)	One Size Fits All (1991)

Professional ratings
Review scores
Source	Rating
Allmusic	2.5/5 stars

Pink Cream 69 is the first full-length album from Pink Cream 69, released in 1989.

== Track listing ==
All tracks are written by Andi Deris, except where noted.

No.	Title	Writer(s)	Length
1.	"Take Those Tears"		4:26
2.	"Sugar for Love"		4:16
3.	"Rolling Down a Thunder"		3:41
4.	"One Step into Paradise"		3:52
5.	"Close Your Eyes"	Dennis Ward, A. Deris	3:39
6.	"Welcome the Night"	Alfred Koffler, A. Deris	5:01
7.	"Partymaker"	A. Koffler, A. Deris	3:45
8.	"Hit the Bottom Row"		3:15
9.	"Parasite"		2:57
10.	"I Only Wanna Be for You"		4:00

2003 CD edition bonus tracks
No.	Title	Writer(s)	Length
11.	"Child of Sorrows"	A. Koffler, A. Deris	3:27
12.	"World of Promises"		5:00
13.	"Shadows Are Falling"		4:09

American edition bonus track
No.	Title	Writer(s)	Length
11.	"White Men Do No Reggae" (Live)	D. Ward

== Singles ==
One Step into Paradise

1. "One Step into Paradise" (extended version)
2. "Partymaker"
3. "Shadows Are Falling"

Close Your Eyes

1. "Close Your Eyes"
2. "Child of Sorrows"

== Personnel ==
- Andi Deris - vocals
- Alfred Koffler - guitar
- Dennis Ward - bass
- Kosta Zafiriou - drums, synth-drums, keyboards
