= Endangered (album) =

Studio album by Pink Cream 69
- Released: 10 October 2001
- Recorded: 2001
- Genre: Hard rock
- Length: 48:44
- Label: Massacre Records; MAS DP0304
- Producer: Dennis Ward

Pink Cream 69 chronology
| Mixery (2000) | Endangered (2001) | Thunderdome (2004) |

Endangered is the 8th studio album by hard rock band Pink Cream 69.

== Track listing ==
All tracks are written by Alfred Koffler and David Readman, except where noted

| No. | Title | Writer(s) | Length |
|---|---|---|---|
| 1. | "Intro" | | 1:06 |
| 2. | "Shout!" | | 3:49 |
| 3. | "Promised Land" | | 5:08 |
| 4. | "Trust the Wise Man" | | 4:08 |
| 5. | "Don't Need Your Touch" | | 4:24 |
| 6. | "He Took the World" | | 5:35 |
| 7. | "Enslaved" | | 4:07 |
| 8. | "In My Dreams" | | 3:41 |
| 9. | "High As a Mountain" | | 4:08 |
| 10. | "Shadows of Time" | | 4:20 |
| 11. | "Pinball Wizard" (The Who Cover) | Pete Townshend | 3:24 |
| 12. | "One Time Is Not Enough" | | 4:30 |

Asia Release Bonus Track
| No. | Title | Length |
|---|---|---|
| 13. | "Queen of Sorrow" | 3:55 |

== Personnel ==
- David Readman – vocals
- Alfred Koffler – guitar
- Dennis Ward – bass
- Kosta Zafiriou – drums

Production

- Dennis Ward – mixing, engineering
