= Doom of Destiny =

Studio album by Axxis
- Released: 16 November 2007
- Genre: Power metal
- Length: 46:15
- Label: AFM Records

Axxis chronology
Paradise in Flames (2006)	Doom of Destiny (2007)	Utopia (2009)

Professional ratings
Review scores
Source	Rating
Metal.de	4/10 stars
Rock Hard	8/10 stars
Noise.fi	4/5 stars
Heavymetal.dk	7/10 stars
Powermetal.de	

Doom of Destiny, released in 2007, is the eleventh full-length album by the German power metal band Axxis. It was released on November 19, 2007.

== Track listing ==
Doom of Destiny track listing
No.	Title	Length
1.	"Voices of Destiny"	1:16
2.	"Doom of Destiny" (Arabia)	4:09
3.	"Better Fate"	5:08
4.	"Bloodangel"	4:41
5.	"I Hear You Cry"	4:56
6.	"The Fire Still Burns"	3:49
7.	"Father Father"	4:12
8.	"Revolutions"	3:48
9.	"She Got Nine Lifes"	3:38
10.	"Devilish Belle"	5:27
11.	"Astoria"	5:08
12.	"Engel Aus Hass" (bonus track)
Total length:		51:12
