= Underworld (Adagio album) =

Studio album by Adagio
- Released: 23 July 2003
- Recorded: 2003
- Genre: Progressive metal, neoclassical metal, symphonic metal
- Length: 63.30
- Label: Nothing to Say
- Producer: Dennis Ward

Adagio chronology
Sanctus Ignis (2001)	Underworld (2003)	A Band in Upperworld (2004)

Professional ratings
Review scores
Source	Rating
Metal Temple	8/10 stars

Underworld is the second studio album by French progressive/neoclassical metal band Adagio, released in 2003. It is the last by the band to feature David Readman on vocals and Dirk Bruinenberg on drums.

== Track listing ==
All lyrics are written by Stéphan Forté, except where noted; all music is composed by Stéphan Forté, except where noted

No.	Title	Length
1.	"Next Profundis" (M: Stéphan Forté / Kevin Codfert)	7:39
2.	"Introïtus/Solvet Saeclum in Favilla"	8:14
3.	"Chosen"	7:52
4.	"From My Sleep... to Someone Else"	6:37
5.	"Underworld"	13:25
6.	"Promises"	5:03
7.	"The Mirror Stage" (L: Audrey Bedos)	6:31
8.	"Niflheim" (instrumental)	8:09

Japanese edition bonus track
No.	Title	Length
9.	"Missa Aeterna"	6:37

== Personnel ==
- Stéphan Forté – guitar
- David Readman – vocals
- Kevin Codfert – keyboard
- Franck Hermanny – bass
- Dirk Bruinenberg – drums
- Dennis Ward – producer

with

- Rose Hreidmarr of Anorexia Nervosa – guest vocals on tracks 4 and 7

== Charts ==
Chart (2003)	Peak position
French Albums (SNEP)	111
