= Games People Play (album) =

Studio album by Pink Cream 69
- Released: 3 May 1993
- Genre: Hard rock, glam metal
- Length: 51:57 (56:39)
- Label: Epic
- Producer: Dirk Steffens & Pink Cream 69

Pink Cream 69 chronology
One Size Fits All (1991)	Games People Play (1993)	Change (1995)

Games People Play is the third studio album by Pink Cream 69. It was the final album with Andi Deris on vocals.

== Track listing ==
All tracks are written by Pink Cream 69.

No.	Title	Length
1.	"Face in the Mirror"	4:47
2.	"Way Down"	5:11
3.	"Keep Your Eye on the Twisted"	3:29
4.	"Somedays I Sail"	4:57
5.	"Shattered"	3:58
6.	"Monday Again"	3:11
7.	"Dyin' Century"	4:37
8.	"Till You're Mine"	3:42
9.	"Still Alive"	4:55
10.	"Down on Your Luck"	4:11
11.	"Backflash" (Instrumental)	0:59
12.	"Condemnation"	4:28
13.	"Don't Let It All Come Down"	3:32

Asian release bonus tracks
No.	Title	Length
14.	"A Good Waste of Time"	4:42

== Personnel ==
- Andi Deris – vocals
- Alfred Koffler – guitar
- Dennis Ward – bass guitar
- Kosta Zafiriou – drums

== Production ==
- Mixing – Dirk Steffens and Gerhard Wolfle
- Engineer – Dirk Steffens and Birger Holm

== Artwork ==
The artwork by W. A. Motzek is based on the painting Etude de 35 têtes d'expression by French artist Louis-Leopold Boilly.

== Critical reception ==
In a contemporary review for the german edition of Metal Hammer, Jörg Staude stated the album would be "interesting, rich in variety and very sophisticated" evaluating it as their best album by then, grading it with six of seven possible points.
