= Food for Thought (Pink Cream 69 album) =

Studio album by Pink Cream 69
- Released: 25 July 1997
- Recorded: Trick Studio, Rauenberg, Kraichgau, Germany; August–September 1996
- Genre: Hard rock, alternative metal
- Length: 50:28 (52:46)
- Label: High Gain Records
- Producer: Pink Cream 69

Pink Cream 69 chronology
Change (1995)	Food for Thought (1997)	Electrified (1998)

Food for Thought is the fifth album by German hard rock group Pink Cream 69, released in 1997.

== Track listing ==
All tracks are written by Pink Cream 69, except where noted

No.	Title	Writer(s)	Length
1.	"Snap"		2:57
2.	"Big Shot"		2:47
3.	"Anger"		3:33
4.	"Diggin' through the Past"		4:09
5.	"Better Days"		3:22
6.	"Until I Wake"		4:04
7.	"Fate"		3:55
8.	"We Will Rock You" (Queen cover)	Brian May	1:56
9.	"Dead Man's Scream"		4:12
10.	"Pass You By"		3:32
11.	"Other Side"		4:04
12.	"Fly On"		3:06
13.	"Sorry"		3:22
14.	"(Down) My Way"		4:50

Asian release bonus tracks
No.	Title	Length
15.	"(I'm) Easy"	2:18
16.	"Black Rain" (Previously Unreleased Demo)	3:18
17.	"Seasons Change" (Previously Unreleased Demo)	4:20

== Personnel ==
- David Readman - vocals
- Alfred Koffler - guitar
- Dennis Ward - bass guitar
- Kosta Zafiriou - drums
- Achim Reichelt - keyboards (Tracks 4 & 12)
- Peter Eptinger - timpani (Track 7)

== Production ==
- Mixing – Dennis Ward and Gerhard Wolfle
- Engineer – Dennis Ward
