= Ascending to Infinity =

Studio album by Luca Turilli's Rhapsody
- Released: June 22, 2012
- Recorded: Backyard Studios, Kempten, Germany, Luca Turilli's private studio, Trieste, Italy, Hiroshima Studio, Challonges, France, December 2011-March 2012
- Genre: Symphonic power metal
- Length: 57:35
- Label: Nuclear Blast
- Producer: Luca Turilli

Luca Turilli's Rhapsody chronology
Ascending to Infinity (2012)	Prometheus, Symphonia Ignis Divinus (2015)

Professional ratings
Review scores
Source	Rating
Metalunderground	5/5 stars

Ascending to Infinity is the debut studio album by the Italian symphonic power metal band Luca Turilli's Rhapsody, created by Luca Turilli after his departure from Rhapsody of Fire. It was released on June 22, 2012 via Nuclear Blast.

Considered by the band member as their own "Rhapsody's 11th album", it is the only album to feature Alex Holzwarth on drums, as he subsequently decided to focus on his duties in Rhapsody of Fire.

== Track listing ==
All tracks are written by Luca Turilli, except "Luna" by Romano Musumarra and Giorgio Flavio Pintus

No.	Title	Length
1.	"Quantum X"	2:26
2.	"Ascending to Infinity"	6:15
3.	"Dante's Inferno"	4:57
4.	"Excalibur"	8:06
5.	"Tormento e Passione"	4:52
6.	"Dark Fate of Atlantis"	6:30
7.	"Luna" (Alessandro Safina cover)	4:16
8.	"Clash of the Titans"	4:15
9.	"Of Michael the Archangel and Lucifer's Fall; I. "In Profundis"; II. "Fatum Mortalis"; III. "Ignis Divinus"	16:02; 2:28; 12:26; 1:08

Limited edition bonus track
No.	Title	Writer(s)	Length
10.	"March of Time" (Helloween cover)	Kai Hansen	5:50

Japanese & Mexican limited editions bonus tracks
No.	Title	Writer(s)	Length
10.	"March of Time" (Helloween cover)	Kai Hansen	5:50
11.	"In the Mirror" (Loudness cover)	Akira Takasaki	3:37

== Personnel ==
Band members

- Alessandro Conti - lead vocals
- Luca Turilli - guitar, keyboards, orchestral arrangements, producer, engineer, cover concept
- Dominique Leurquin - guitar
- Patrice Guers - bass
- Alex Holzwarth - drums

Additional musicians

- Bridget Fogle, Previn Moore, Matthias Stockinger, Dan Lucas, Johnny Krüger - choir
- Sassy Bernert - female voice on tracks 5, 7 and 9
- Jasen Anthony, Previn Moore, Bridget Fogle - narrators

Production

- Sebastian 'Basi' Roeder - engineer, mixing
- Arnaud Ménard - engineer
- Christoph Stickel - mastering

== Chart performance ==
Chart (2012)	Peak position
Hungarian Albums Chart	14
German Albums Chart	32
Swiss Albums Chart	55
Italian Albums Chart	56
French Albums Chart	84
Japanese Albums Chart	103
Belgian Albums Chart	108
