= Adagio (band) =

French progressive metal band

- Origin: Montpellier, France
- Genres: Power metal; symphonic metal; progressive metal; neoclassical metal
- Years active: 2000–2018
- Labels: Listenable; Zeta Nemesis
- Members: Stéphan Forté; Franck Hermanny; Kévin Codfert; Kelly Sundown Carpenter; Jelly Cardarelli; Mayline Gautié
- Past members: David Readman; Eric Lebailly; Dirk Bruinenberg; Richard Andersson; Gus Monsanto; Christian Palin; Mats Levén; Guillaume Bergiron

Adagio is a French metal band formed in 2000 by guitarist Stéphan Forté and disbanded in 2018.

== History ==
Since their third studio album, Dominate, Adagio evolved from power metal while still adhering to elements of virtuosity and orchestral influences. Dominate implemented a heavier sound with death grunts. Archangels in Black was the band's fourth album. The band stated that the "compositions are the ultimate between melodic and extreme metal, and can be considered as a more brutal version of (their second album) Underworld".

In April 2016, Stéphan Forté created an Indiegogo campaign to fund Adagio's fifth album, Life. The campaign ended on 5 June 2016, reaching 148% of its goal. The album was expected to come out in December 2016 on Forté's own label, Zeta Nemesis. The release was delayed to 26 July 2017, but the band premiered the song "Darkness Machine" two months beforehand.

Forté announced an indefinite hiatus of Adagio in April 2018, to pursue a solo career.

== Musical style ==
Adagio's music is known by its technical precision and dark orchestration. Adagio keeps unique complex lead workings which are complemented with a powerful and driving rhythm section.

In their album Life, Adagio mixes progressive metal with eastern ethnic and djent influences.

== Band members ==
Last known lineup

- Stéphan Forté – guitar (2000–2018)
- Franck Hermanny – bass guitar (2000–2018)
- Kévin Codfert – keyboards (2003–2018)
- Kelly Sundown Carpenter – lead vocals (2011–2018)
- Jelly Cardarelli – drums (2016–2018)
- Mayline Gautié – violin (2016–2018)

Former

- David Readman – vocals (2000–2004)
- Dirk Bruinenberg – drums (2000–2004)
- Richard Andersson – keyboards (2000–2003)
- Éric Lebailly – drums (2004–2013)
- Gus Monsanto – vocals (2004–2008)
- Christian Palin – vocals (2008–2010)
- Guillaume Bergiron – drums (2016)

Touring

- Kelly Sundown Carpenter – vocals (2008)
- Mats Levén – vocals (2010–2011)

== Discography ==
Studio albums

- Sanctus Ignis (2001)
- Underworld (2003)
- Dominate (2005)
- Archangels in Black (2009)
- Life (2017)

Live albums

- A Band in Upperworld (2004)
