= David Readman =

British singer

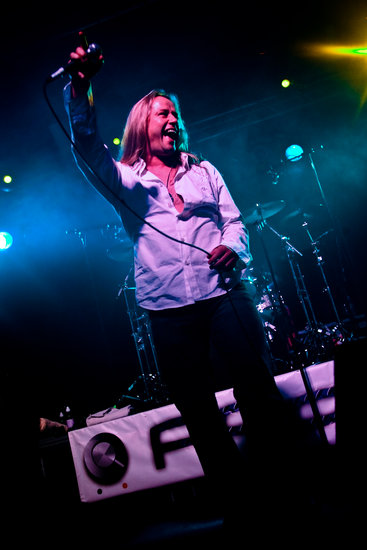
- Readman performing at Firefest 2008

Background information
- Born: 6 July 1970 (age 56)
- Origin: Burnley, England
- Genres: Hard rock; progressive metal; heavy metal; symphonic metal; neo-classical metal
- Occupation: Singer
- Labels: Frontiers; AFM

David Readman (born 6 July 1970) is an English singer best known as the vocalist of hard rock band Pink Cream 69 and former vocalist of progressive metal band Adagio. He released a solo album in 2007 and was part of German guitarist Alex Beyrodt's band Voodoo Circle, from 2008 to 2016, returning in 2020.

In 2015, two new projects featuring Readman on lead vocals were announced. The first called Room Experience, is a melodic rock project led by Italian musician Gianluca Firmo, with a self-titled album released in May 2015. And the second is Almanac, the new heavy metal band led by former Rage guitarist Victor Smolski. In September 2016 it was announced he had reformed the David Readman Band, his solo band that he founded in Germany. It now features Dutch musicians Emile Marcelis (ex-Vengeance, bass), Eddie Claessens (Vandale, drums) and Bram Engelen (Ostrogoth, guitars).

Readman joined British heavy metal band Tank in 2017. In October of the same year, a new project called Pendulum of Fortune came out, featuring Readman with Bodo Schopf, Franky R. and led by Vladimir Shevjakov.

== Early life ==
Readman was born in Burnley, Lancashire, and attended Towneley High School.

== Discography ==
=== Solo ===
- David Readman (2007)
- Medusa (2022)

=== Pink Cream 69 ===
- Change (1995)
- Food for Thought (1997)
- Electrified (1998)
- Live (1999)
- Sonic Dynamite (2000)
- Mixery (2000)
- Endangered (2001)
- Thunderdome (2004)
- In10sity (2007)
- Ceremonial (2013)
- Headstrong (2017)

=== Adagio ===
- Sanctus Ignis (2001)
- Underworld (2003)
- A Band in Upperworld (2004)

=== Andersen/Laine/Readman ===
- III (Three) (2006)

=== Voodoo Circle ===
- Voodoo Circle (2008)
- Broken Heart Syndrome (2011)
- More Than One Way Home (2013)
- Whisky Fingers (2015)
- Locked & Loaded (2021)
- Hail to the King (2024)

=== Room Experience ===
- Room Experience (2015)
- Another Time And Place (2020)

=== Almanac ===
- Tsar (2016)
- Kingslayer (2017)

=== Pendulum of Fortune ===
- Searching for the God Inside (2017)
- Return To Eden (2019)

=== Tank ===
- Re-Ignition (2019)

=== Immunity for the Masses ===
- Welcome to This Nightmare (2020)

=== As a guest ===
==== Misha Calvin ====
- Evolution II (1995) (under the name Dave Twose)

==== D. C. Cooper ====
- D. C. Cooper (1999) (backing vocals)

==== Silent Force ====
- The Empire of Future (2000)

==== Missa Mercuria ====
- Missa Mercuria (2002)

==== Delany ====
- Blaze and Ashes (2009)

==== Place Vendome ====
- Place Vendome (2005) (co-wrote "Heavens Door" and backing vocals)

==== Magnus Karlsson's Free Fall ====
- Free Fall (2013)
- Kingdom of Rock (2015)

==== Thomas Zwijsen ====
- Perferct Storm, Nylonized Album (2014)

==== Luca Turilli's Rhapsody ====
- Prometheus, Symphonia Ignis Divinus – lead vocals on "King Solomon and the 72 Names of God" (2015)

==== Thomas Blug ====
- Blug Plays Hendrix (2010)
