= Axxis =

German heavy metal band

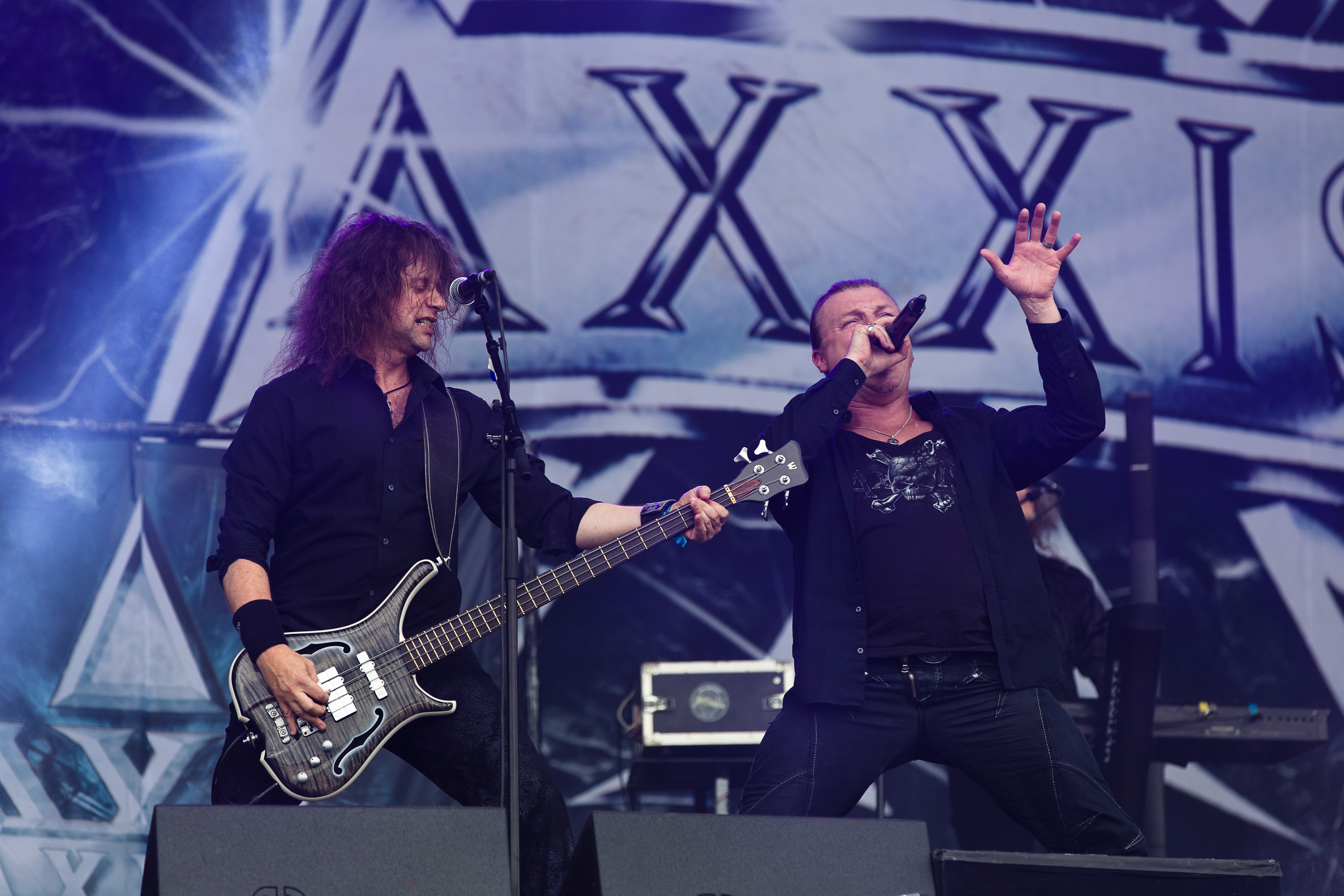
- Axxis concert on Rockharz festival 2016 in Germany

Background information
- Origin: Dortmund, Germany
- Genres: Power metal, heavy metal, electronic rock, hard rock
- Years active: 1988–present
- Labels: Phonotraxx, AFM, Massacre, EMI, Harvest
- Members: Bernhard Weiß; Harry Oellers; Rob Schomaker; Dirk Brand; Matthias Degener
- Website: Official site

Axxis is a German heavy metal band that was founded in 1988. Their debut album, Kingdom of the Night, became the best-selling debut album by a hard rock band in Germany in 1989.

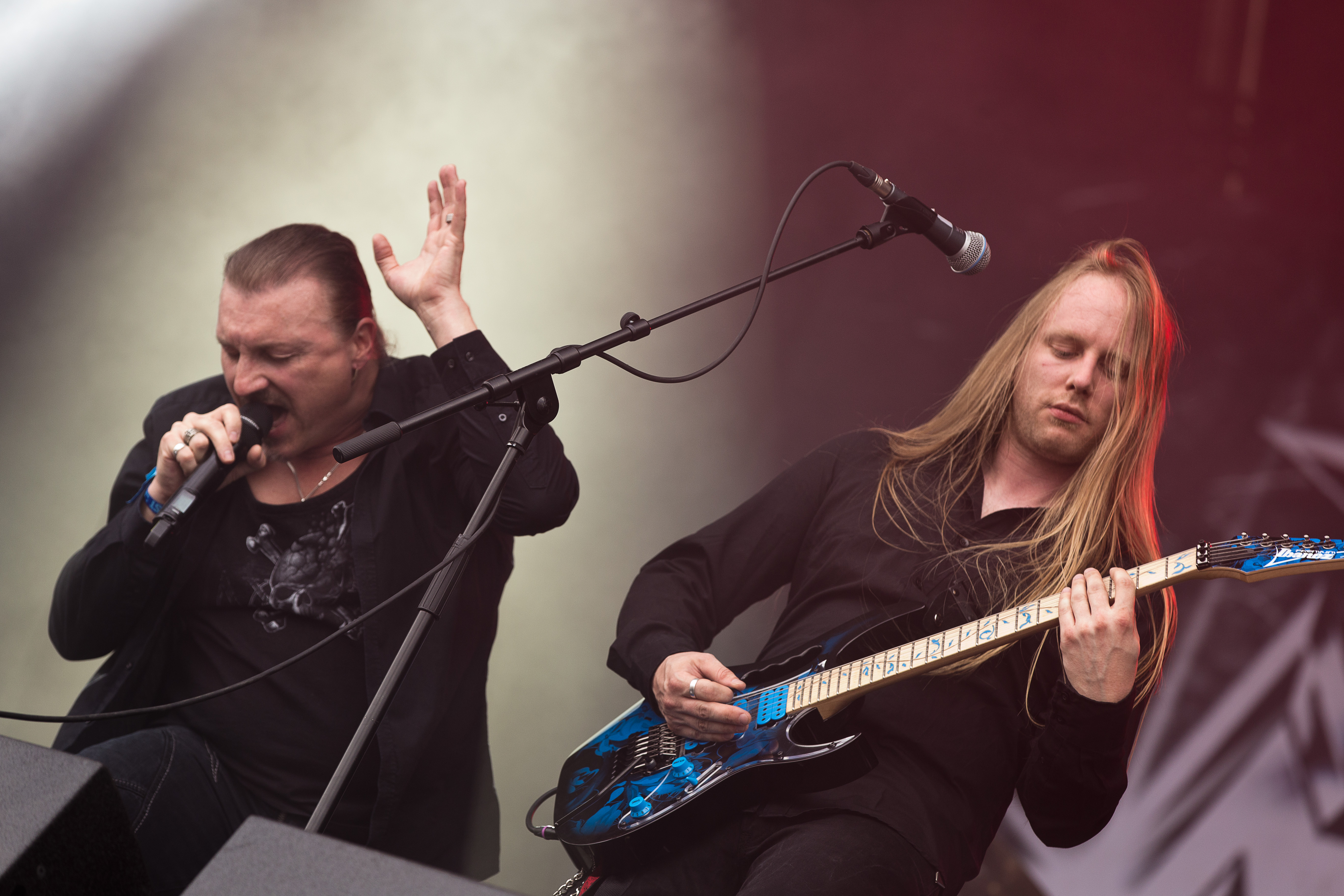
Singer Bernhard Weiß and guitarist Stefan Weber at Rockharz 2016

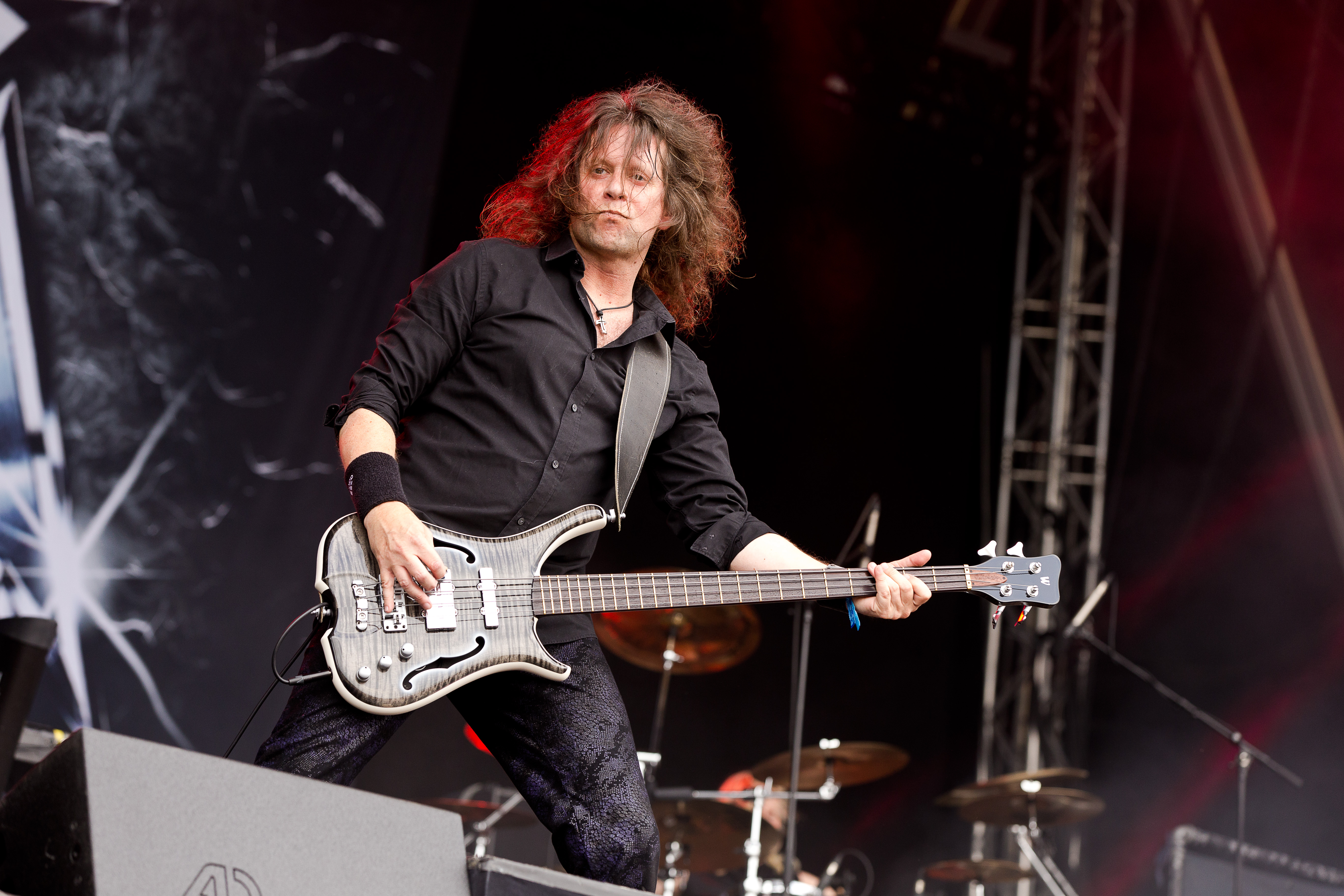
Bassist Rob Schomaker at Rockharz 2016

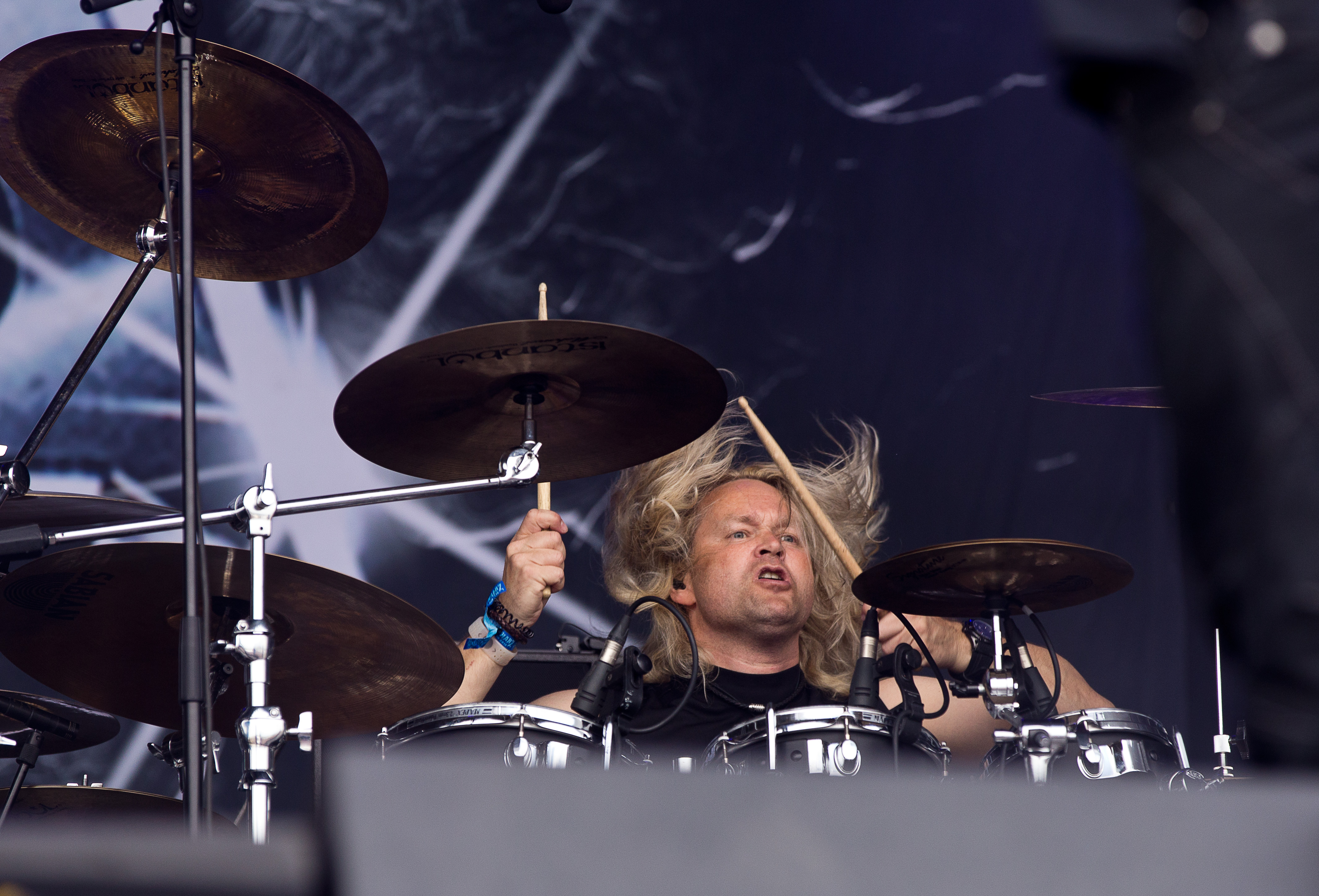
Drummer Dirk Brand at Rockharz 2016

== Biography ==
Axxis' musical roots lie within the traditional hard rock of the 1970s and 1980s, including influences of 1990s electronic music. The band was formed in the early 1980s as Anvil. They released several self-recorded demos under that name, before discovering the Canadian band Anvil who had already released an album internationally.

In response to this, the band changed their name in the year 1980 to “Axis”. In interview with Battle Helm in 2015, vocalist Bernhard Weiß stated that the new band name must be a small word to get bigger letters on the promotional posters, but he also stated that they chose the name because "the name AXIS sounds a bit like guitar axes, but also meaning wise".

They recorded the demo Tears of the Trees (later to appear on the Kingdom of the Night album) in 1988, and submitted it to EMI records several times. The band signed to EMI Electrola. Due to an EMI subsidiary in Germany also named Axis, the band introduced a second X in their name, becoming “Axxis”. At this time, the band consisted of vocalist Bernhard Weiß, guitarist Walter Pietsch, bassist Werner Kleinhans and drummer Richard Michaelski.

Axxis then released their debut album, Kingdom of the Night in 1989. This album was released in Europe, Canada, Japan, Australia and the USA, and sold 100,000 copies. It became 1989's best selling debut album by a hard rock band in Germany. Axxis toured to promote the album, opening for such bands as Black Sabbath.

In 1990, Axxis released Axxis II, which achieved similar success. Keyboard player Harry Oellers was added for the album. The album also contained the single "Touch the Rainbow" and the fan-favourite "Little Look Back" (later to become an anthem in their live shows), and was followed by Access All Areas in 1991, the first live album by the band.

The band then released The Big Thrill in 1993. Produced by Joey Balin and recorded in Philadelphia, it was the first international production by Axxis. The album became a best seller in 1993. It was promoted by the band in various shows, including in Japan, where acoustic performances by Weiß and Pietsch would later be included in Profile – The Best of Axxis, a 1994 Japan-only release.

Axxis continued to record in America for their next album Matters of Survival, and had Keith Olsen to produce it. Axxis wanted Olsen to produce their previous album, The Big Thrill, but he declined due to time restraints. Weiß later implied that Olsen tried to change the band’s sound from heavy metal to alternative, which was trending at that time. Matters of Survival was released in 1995, and fans rejected it due to the change in sound. Weiß admitted later this album was “not metal enough”.

Axxis continued to play with a modern rock style in their 1996 album, Voodoo Vibes, the last album they recorded under EMI. Axxis then parted ways with long-time guitarist Walter Pietsch. According to Weiß, Pietsch choose to be a producer, and has since become a well-known producer in Germany.

Axxis then signed with Massacre Records in 2000 to record the album Back to the Kingdom, with a name implying the return to their classic heavy metal sound. The new album was received well among fans, and the followed up in 2000 and 2001 with the compilation albums Collection of Power and Eyes of Darkness.

Bernhard Weiß’ vocal style is a trademark of the band, and he (along with Oellers) has been Axxis’ most constant member, featuring in the band from 1988 to present. Over time, Axxis have adopted classic and modern power metal into their sound, as heard on the albums Time Machine (2004), Paradise in Flames (2006), Doom of Destiny (2007) and Utopia (2009).

The band celebrated their 20th anniversary in 2011, releasing 20 Years of Axxis on their publishing company, Phonotraxx. The anniversary production was an official bootleg live recording released on both CD and DVD, the following year they released the cover album reDISCOver(ed), featuring covers of "Ma Baker", "Stayin' Alive, "My Heart Will Go On" and many more.

In 2014, the band returned to their Back to the Kingdom roots with the release of Kingdom of the Night II a double-CD release sequel to their debut album. The double-CDs were released as the hard rock oriented “white” and the heavy metal and power metal oriented “black” versions, respectively, with different songs on them, and were sold separately as well as packaged together in a “Deluxe” edition.

Axxis celebrated their 25th anniversary the live release of 25 Years of Rock & Power in 2015. In early 2017, they released Retrolution, a heavy metal and hard rock-oriented album, taking various throwback elements to the bands which Axxis had listened to over the years. The title implies this, word-playing “retro” with “revolution”. In October 2018, they released their new studio album Monster Hero.

In 2019, they celebrated their 30th anniversary with a tour, their first ever live Blu-Ray Bang Your Head with Axxis, as well as a double album Best of EMI-Years with re-recordings of songs from the years 1989-1997.

== Members ==
- Bernhard Weiß – guitars, vocals (1988–present)
- Rob Schomaker – bass (2004–present)
- Dirk Brand – drums (2012–present)
- Matthias Degener – guitars (2016–present)

=== Former members ===
- Harry Oellers – keyboards (1990–2024)
- Guido Wehmeyer – guitars (1998–2006)
- Werner Kleinhaus – bass (1988–1993)
- Walter Pietsch – guitars (1988–1998)
- Markus Gfeller – bass (1993–1998)
- Richard Michalski – drums (1988–2004)
- Kuno Niemeyer – bass (1998–2004)
- André Hilgers – drums (2004–2008)
- Alex Landenburg – drums (2008–2011)
- Marco Wriedt – guitars (2007–2015)
- Stefan Weber - guitars

== Discography ==
=== Albums ===
- 1989: Kingdom of the Night (GER: No. 42)
- 1990: Axxis II (GER: No. 32)
- 1993: The Big Thrill (GER: No. 38)
- 1995: Matters of Survival (GER: No. 48)
- 1997: Voodoo Vibes (GER: No. 82)
- 1999: Pure and Rough
- 2000: Back to the Kingdom (GER: No. 59)
- 2001: Eyes of Darkness (GER: No. 83)
- 2004: Time Machine (GER: No. 72)
- 2006: Paradise in Flames (GER: No. 45)
- 2007: Doom of Destiny
- 2009: Utopia (GER: No. 40)
- 2012: reDISCOver(ed) - album of cover versions
- 2014: Kingdom of the Night II (GER: No. 28)
- 2017: Retrolution (GER: No. 36. CH: No. 87)
- 2018: Monster Hero (GER: No. 76)
- 2020: Virus of a Modern Time – digital EP (GER: No. 49)
- 2024: Coming Home

=== Live albums ===
- Access All Areas (1991)
- 20 Years of Axxis (2011)
- 25 Years of Rock & Power (2015)

=== Compilation albums ===
- Profile - The Best of Axxis (1994) (Japan release)
- Collection of Power (2000)
- Best of Ballads & Acoustic Specials (2006)
- Best of EMI-Years (2019)

=== DVDs ===
- 20 Years of Axxis (2011)
- 25 Years of Rock & Power (2015)
- Bang Your Head With Axxis (2019)
