= Dennis Ward (musician) =

American bassist and music producer (born 1967)

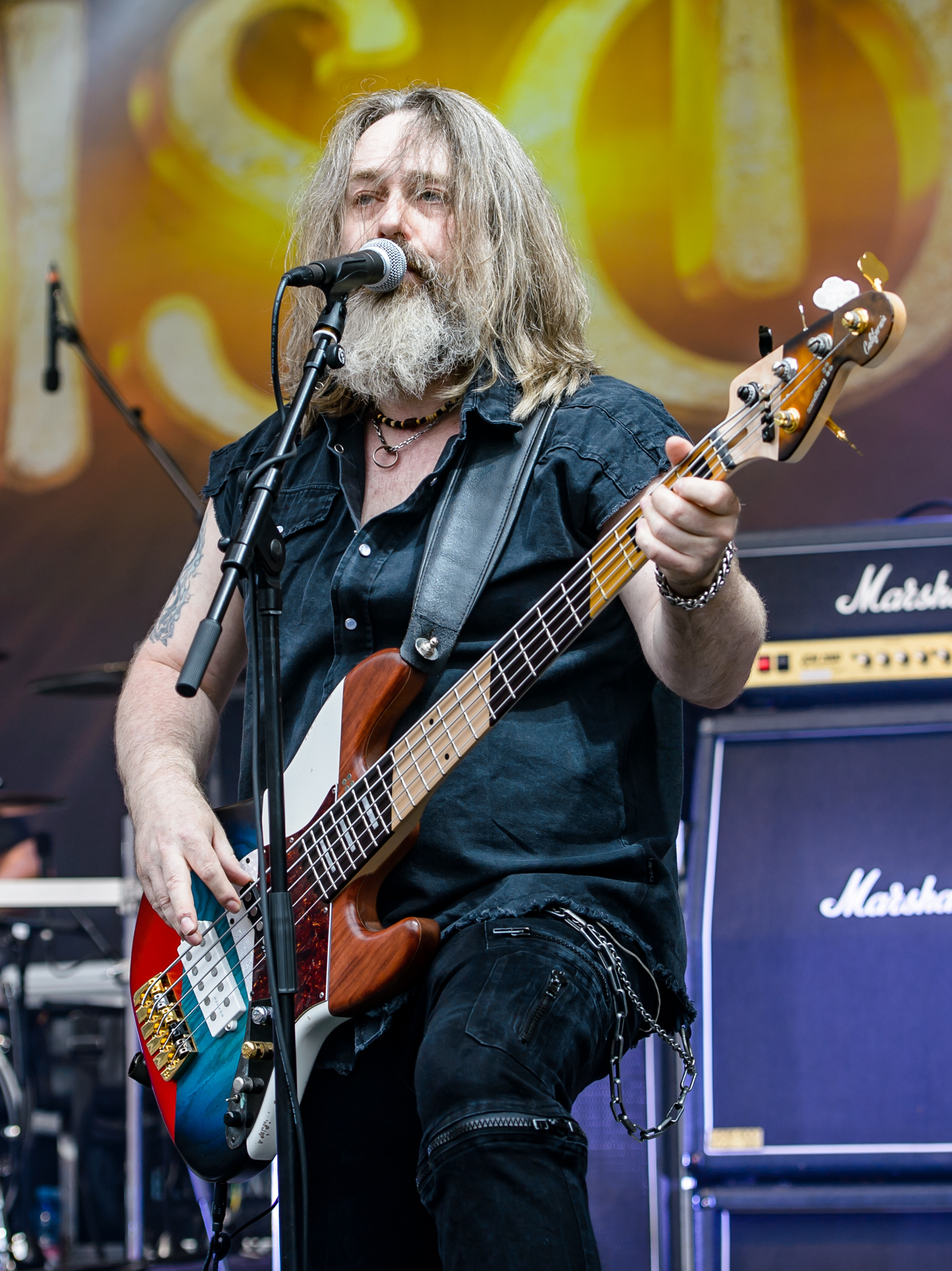
- Ward with Unisonic in 2016

Background information
- Born: November 22, 1967 (age 58); Texas, United States
- Genres: Hard rock, AOR, heavy metal, power metal, symphonic metal, progressive metal, symphonic rock, progressive rock
- Occupations: Musician, record producer
- Instruments: Bass, keyboards
- Years active: 1986–present
- Member of: Magnum, Khymera
- Formerly of: Pink Cream 69, Unisonic
- Website: dennisward.de

Dennis Ward is an American bass player and music producer. He is known for his various works as a producer for heavy metal and hard rock bands in Europe, as well as for being the bassist and founder of the bands Pink Cream 69 and Unisonic. He is currently bassist for English hard rock band, Magnum.

== Biography ==
In 2017, Ward joined the band Panorama. The same year he also joined Firewind and former Ozzy Osbourne guitarist Gus G to produce his solo album Fearless and be part of his supporting band as the bass player and vocalist.

In June 2019 Ward was announced as the new bassist of classic British hard rock band Magnum.

== Discography ==
=== with Pink Cream 69 ===
- 1989: Pink Cream 69
- 1991: One Size Fits All
- 1993: Games People Play
- 1995: Change
- 1997: Food for Thought
- 1998: Electrified
- 2000: Sonic Dynamite
- 2000: Mixery (EP)
- 2001: Endangered
- 2003: Live
- 2004: Thunderdome
- 2007: In10sity
- 2009: Live in Karlsruhe
- 2013: Ceremonial
- 2017: Headstrong

=== with D.C. Cooper ===
- 1999: D. C. Cooper

=== with Missa Mercuria ===
- 2002: Missa Mercuria

=== with Place Vendome ===
- 2005: Place Vendome
- 2009: Streets of Fire
- 2013: Thunder in the Distance
- 2017: Close to the Sun

=== with Magnum ===
- 2020: The Serpent Rings
- 2022: The Monster Roars
- 2024: Here Comes the Rain

=== with Khymera ===
- 2005: A New Promise
- 2008: The Greatest Wonder
- 2015: The Grand Design
- 2020: Master of 1llusions
- 2023: Hold Your Ground

=== with Sunstorm ===
- 2006: Sunstorm
- 2009: House of Dreams
- 2012: Emotional Fire

=== with Bob Catley ===
- 2008: Immortal

=== with Unisonic ===
- 2012: Ignition (EP)
- 2012: Unisonic
- 2014: For the Kingdom (EP)
- 2014: Light of Dawn
- 2017: Live in Wacken

=== with Panorama ===
- 2018: Around the World

=== with Gus G ===
- 2018: Fearless

=== with Tribuzy ===
- 2005: Execution

=== with Bassinvaders ===
- 2008: Hellbassbeaters

=== with Beverly Killz ===
- 2012: Gasoline & Broken Hearts

=== with Alekseevskaya Ploshchad ===
- 2016: Words

=== with Kiko Loureiro ===
- 2020: Open Source

=== with Edu Falaschi ===
- 2021: Vera Cruz
- 2023: Eldorado

=== with Angra ===
- 2001: Rebirth
- 2002: Rebirth World Tour: Live in São Paulo (CD)
- 2002: Rebirth World Tour: Live in São Paulo (DVD)
- 2002: Hunters and Prey
- 2004: Temple of Shadows
- 2006: Aurora Consurgens
- 2023: Cycles of Pain
