= Pink Cream 69 =

German rock band

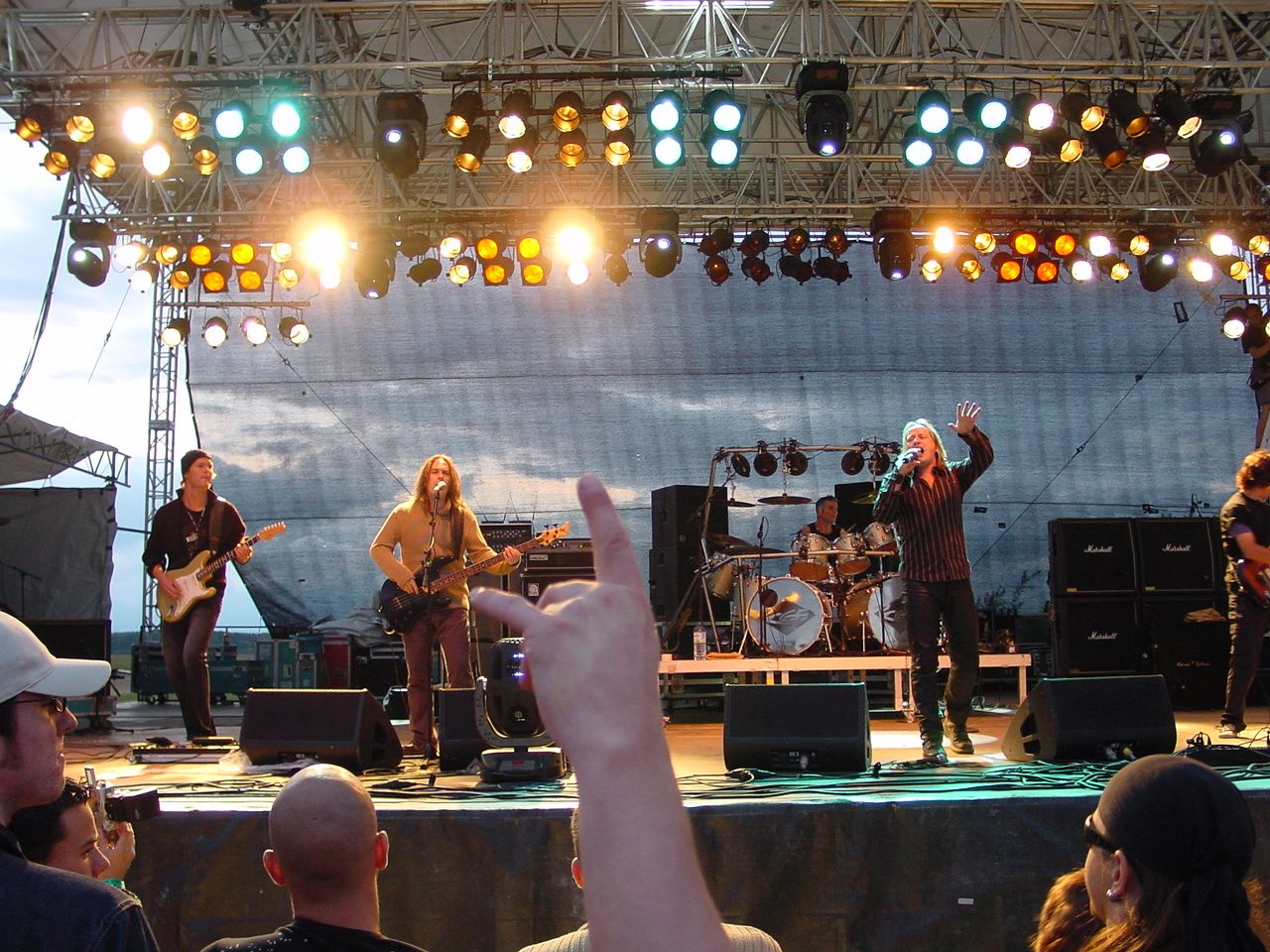
- Pink Cream 69 in 2003

Background information
- Origin: Karlsruhe, Germany
- Genres: Hard rock; heavy metal
- Years active: 1987–2023
- Labels: Epic; Massacre; Frontiers
- Past members: Alfred Koffler; Dennis Ward; Kosta Zafiriou; Andi Deris; Uwe Reitenauer; David Readman; Chris Schmidt; Roman Beselt; Marco Wriedt
- Website: pinkcream69.com

Pink Cream 69 was a German hard rock/heavy metal band from Karlsruhe, formed in 1987.

== History ==
The band was formed in 1987 by Andi Deris, Dennis Ward, Kosta Zafiriou and Alfred Koffler. They gained their first contract by winning music magazine Metal Hammer's newcomer competition in Ludwigsburg one year after forming. In 1994, Deris left the band to join Helloween. He was replaced by British singer David Readman in August 1994. The band, often referred to as The Pinkies, became a five-piece in 2003, when Uwe Reitenauer was hired to support neuropathic guitar player Alfred Koffler. In March 2012, it was announced that drummer Kosta Zafiriou had left the band due to his activities as a manager at the company Bottom Row and as the drummer and manager of the new band Unisonic. He was replaced by Chris Schmidt. In 2019 and 2020, respectively, bassist Dennis Ward and guitarist Uwe Reitenauer announced their departure from the band. They were replaced by Roman Beselt (Sons of Sounds) and Marco Wriedt (21 Octayne, Arc of Light, Axxis).

In 2023, the last remaining founding member, Alfred Koffler, retired.

== Members ==
- Alfred Koffler – guitars, backing vocals (1987–2023)
- Dennis Ward – bass, backing vocals (1987–2019)
- Kosta Zafiriou – drums, backing vocals (1987–2012)
- Andi Deris – lead vocals (1987–1993)
- David Readman – lead vocals (1994–2023)
- Uwe Reitenauer – guitars, backing vocals (2003–2020)
- Chris Schmidt – drums (2012–2023)
- Roman Beselt – bass, backing vocals (2019–2023)
- Marco Wriedt – guitars, backing vocals (2020–2023)

Timeline

== Discography ==
=== Studio albums ===
- 1989: Pink Cream 69
- 1991: One Size Fits All
- 1993: Games People Play
- 1995: Change
- 1997: Food for Thought
- 1998: Electrified
- 2000: Sonic Dynamite
- 2001: Endangered
- 2004: Thunderdome
- 2007: In10sity
- 2013: Ceremonial
- 2017: Headstrong

=== Live albums ===
- 1997: Live
- 2009: Live in Karlsruhe

=== EPs ===
- 1991: 49°/8°
- 1991: 36°/140°
- 2000: Mixery

=== Maxi-singles ===
- 1993: Face in the Mirror
- 1995: 20th Century Boy

=== VHS ===
- 1992: Size It Up – Live in Japan '92

=== DVD ===
- 2009: Past & Present
