= Rock music in Switzerland =

Rock and roll first entered Switzerland in the 1950s, as a series of American musicians popularized the style internationally.

== Summary ==
The first Swiss rock band of note were Les Sauterelles, formed in 1962 and often referred to as "the Swiss Beatles". Their Shadows influenced all-instrumental 1965 single, "Hongkong", was the first beat song to hit number 1 on the Swiss Hitparade. Even more successful, their 1968 single, "Heavenly Club", topped the Swiss charts for seven weeks. After the group's demise in 1970, members of Les Sauterelles would go on to other Swiss bands such as Krokodil, Toad and TEA; vocalist Tony Vescoli would launch a solo career as a singer/songwriter.

Formed in 1969, Krokodil was an influential early Swiss progressive rock group, using exotic instruments such as the sitar. Comprising Zürich scene veterans Hardy Hepp, Walty Anselmo and Düde Dürst (ex-Les Sauterelles), with Mojo Weideli and English bassist Terry Stevens rounding out the line-up, Krokodil released a total of 5 albums through 1973. The Swiss progressive rock and psychedelia scene also produced bands such as The Shiver, Brainticket, Island, Ertlif and Flame Dream. Bern's Sinus Studio was long the most influential studio in Switzerland.

The commercially most successful Swiss rock band of the 1970s were Rumpelstilz, fronted by "the Bob Dylan of Switzerland", Polo Hofer. Rumpelstilz were pioneers of Mundartrock preferring to sing in Bernese German rather than English. Their 1976 album Füüf Narre im Charre (five jesters in the wheelbarrow) produced the massive hit singles "Teddybär" and "Kiosk", respectively. After the breakup of Rumpelstilz in 1978 Hofer would go on to a very successful solo career. His 1985 song "Alpenrose", co-written with former Rumpelstilz bandmate Hanery Ammann, was voted "Biggest Swiss Hit" of all time in 2006 by a Swiss German television audience. Rumpelstilz and Hofer were highly influential on bands like fellow Bernese rockers Züri West and Patent Ochsner, Switzerland most successful Mundartrock bands today.

Notable 1970s Swiss hard and heavy rock acts include Brainticket off-shoot Toad, a bluesy power trio perhaps best known for their debut single "Stay!", Marc Storace fronted semi-progressive outfit TEA, and Krokus who quickly rose to become the most popular Swiss hard rock hand when they added the aforementioned Storace as their new lead vocalist in time for 1980's more heavy metal influenced Metal Rendez-Vous, their international break through. Their Tom Allom produced 1983 album, Headhunter, peaked at #25 on the U.S. Billboard 200 charts and was RIAA certified gold in the United States, making it the best-selling Swiss record in history. Other Swiss hard rock bands to emerge in the wake of Krokus included their Solothurn neighbors Killer, Black Angels, Crown, Steve Whitney Band, Stormbringer, Witchcraft, Bloody Six, Paganini as well as China, Satrox and Alison in the latter part of the 1980s and early 90s.

At about the same period, there were a number of punk and pub rock influenced bands, including the Looney Tunes, The Swiss Horns, Red Devil Band, Circus and Irrwisch.

In the early 1980s, extreme metal pioneers Hellhammer emerged from suburban Zürich before morphing into the more sophisticated Celtic Frost, a groundbreaking band whose pivotal early albums, Morbid Tales, To Mega Therion (with cover artwork by famed Swiss artist H.R. Giger) and Into the Pandemonium, revolutionized heavy metal musically as well as aesthetically. After the initial breakup of Celtic Frost, band leader Tom Warrior, a.k.a. Tom Gabriel Fischer, formed industrial rock outfit Apollyon Sun before successfully reforming Celtic Frost in 2001. As of 2008, Fischer was leading the CF spin-off Triptykon.

Equally as influential and acclaimed as Celtic Frost are The Young Gods from Switzerland's French speaking Romandy region. Formed in 1985 and debuting with their self-titled album in 1987, the experimental Industrial Rock trio, led by sole constant member Franz Treichler, a.k.a. Franz Muse, have released 8 studio albums to date and have been acknowledged as an influence by the likes of David Bowie, U2's The Edge and Faith No More's Mike Patton. Other Romandy acts of international repute are Valais extreme metal band Samael and Geneva's futuristic cyber metalists, Sybreed.

Another Zürich area band, with ties to Celtic Frost, are internationally renowned progressive thrash trio Coroner who released a string of highly acclaimed albums such as No More Color and Mental Vortex in the late 1980s through the mid 1990s. After the demise of Coroner, guitarist Tommy T. Baron, a.k.a. Tommy Vetterli, briefly joined German thrashers Kreator while drummer Marquis Marky, a.k.a. Markus Edelmann, became a member of Tom Warrior's short lived Apollyon Sun. As of 2010, Coroner were active again doing live shows. Yet another Zürich area metal band that made an impression in the late 1980s were Uster based five-piece Drifter with two major label releases, Reality Turns to Dust and Nowhere to Hide, to their credit. Other notable Swiss extreme metal acts of that era include Messiah, Excruciation, Bloodstar and Calhoun Conquer.

In the early 1990s, a very active neo-prog scene began to flourish in the Southern Swiss Canton of Ticino, primarily exemplified by two bands, Clepsydra (InsideOut Music) and Shakary (SHK Records). Another Ticino band, Lugano based Gotthard, emerged in 1992 with their eponymous debut album (their only album not to reach number 1 on the Swiss album charts) and, guided by former Krokus bassist Chris von Rohr, went on to become the most commercially successful Swiss hard rock group since the heyday of Krokus, with numerous gold and platinum certified releases in Switzerland during the course of their 25-year career. The group's best selling album, Homerun, has been certified 3 x platinum for sales in excess of 90,000 copies in their home country. In the shadows of Gotthard, Bern natives Shakra, who first came on the scene with their self-titled 1998 debut album, have established a solid career with several of their releases entering the Swiss and German album charts.

Switzerland's internationally most success new band of the last 10 years have been Eluveitie whose eclectic folk metal style incorporates characteristics of melodic death metal combined with the melodies of traditional Celtic music. Their 2014 album, Origins, reached number 1 on the Swiss album charts.

== Literature ==
- Grand, Lurker. Die Not Hat Ein Ende. The Swiss Art of Rock. Edition Patrick Frey, 2015. ISBN 978-3-905929-77-5
- Grand, Lurker. Heute und danach – The Swiss Underground Music Scene of the 80s. Edition Patrick Frey, 2012. ISBN 978-3-905929-21-8
- Grand, Lurker. Hot Love – Swiss Punk & Wave 1976–1980. Edition Patrick Frey, 2006. ISBN 978-3-905509-62-5
