= Essential Pebbles, Volume 3 =

Compilation album
- Released: 2000
- Recorded: Mid-1960s
- Genre: Garage rock, psychedelic rock
- Label: AIP

chronology
| Essential Pebbles, Volume 2 (1998) | Essential Pebbles, Volume 3 (2000) |

Essential Pebbles, Volume 3 is a compilation album in the Essential Pebbles series. Since the last album in the Pebbles series was released in 2007, this is likely to be the last volume in the Essential Pebbles series. Although the album is subtitled Still More Ultimate '66 garage classics!, not all of the recordings were originally released in 1966. The focus of this compilation is on European garage rock music, with most of the songs being from Swedish bands, along with Dutch and German bands being included.

== Release data ==
This album was released on AIP Records in 2000 as #AIP-1064.

== Notes on the tracks ==
Both CDs feature recordings from continental European bands, all or most of which had previously been featured in the Continent Lashes Back sub-series within the Pebbles series.

== Track listing ==
=== Disc 1 ===
1. Robert Hoeke Rhythm & Blues Group: "When People Talk"
2. The Fun of It: "Drollery" – Rel. 1966
3. The Phantoms: "Someday I'm Somebody" – Rel. 1965
4. The Jets: "I Was So Glad"
5. The Haigs: "Where to Run" – Rel. 1966
6. The Jets: "Worker in the Night"
7. The Lords: "Day after Day" – Rel. 1965
8. The Counsellors: "I'll Be Your Man" – Rel. 1965
9. The Golden Earrings: "Not to Find" – Rel. 1965
10. The Lazy Bones: "I'm Driftin'" – Rel. 1967
11. AB & C: "Vies"
12. Danny & the Royal Strings: "Get Away"
13. Slaves: "Shut Up"
14. Jack & the Outlaws: "Step into My Heart" – Rel. 1965
15. Meteors: "Anytime" – Rel. 1965
16. Mad Sound: "To Masturbate" – Rel. 1968
17. The Beatchers: "What'd I Say"
18. The Tages: "Bloodhound"
19. The Palmes: "Nazz Are Blue" (Jeff Beck) – Rel. 1967
20. The Shakers: "Move out of My Mind"
21. Baby Grandmothers: "Somebody Keeps Calling My Name"
22. The Lee Kings: "Oriental Express"
23. The Stringtones: "Ode to Rhythm & Blues"

=== Disc 2 ===
1. Sooner or Later: "This Hammer"
2. Sooner or Later: "Night Time"
3. The Melvins: "The Man down There"
4. The Trappers: "Too Much Monkey Business"
5. The Shakers: "Tracks Remain"
6. The Fabulous Four: "438 S. Michigan Ave."
7. The Shakers: "Who Will Buy These Wonderful Eyes"
8. The Cads: "Call My Name" – Rel. 1966
9. Los Comancheros: "It's So Right" – Rel. 1966
10. The Dee Jays: "Striped Dreams" – Rel. 1967
11. The Demons: "You" – Rel. 1964
12. The Gents: "Honor Bright"
13. The Dee Jays: "You Must Be Joking" – Rel. 1965
14. The Flippers: "Louie Louie" (Richard Berry)
15. The Bootjacks: "Stoned"
16. The Ones: "Love of Mine" – Rel. 1967
17. Drafi & His Magics: "I Don't Need that Kind of Loving"
18. The Dukes: "I'm an Unskilled Worker"
19. The Sevens: "Talk about Her"
20. The Sevens: "Panam"
21. Les Sauterelles: "No No No" – Rel. 1966
22. The Countdowns: "Sex Maniac"
23. The Sevens: "In God We Trust"
24. The Sevens: "What Can I Do"
25. Les Sauterelles: "Hong Kong"
