= Oh, Lady Be Good! =

1924 show tune by George & Ira Gershwin

Song
- Published: 1924 by Harms Inc.
- Composer: George Gershwin
- Lyricist: Ira Gershwin

"Oh, Lady Be Good!" is a 1924 song by George and Ira Gershwin. It was introduced by Walter Catlett in the Broadway musical Lady, Be Good! written by Guy Bolton, Fred Thompson, and the Gershwin brothers and starring Fred and Adele Astaire. The song was also performed by the chorus in the film Lady Be Good (1941), although the film is unrelated to the musical.

Recordings in 1925 were by Paul Whiteman, Carl Fenton, and Cliff Edwards. A 1947 recording of the song became a hit for Ella Fitzgerald, notable for her scat solo. For her album Ella Fitzgerald Sings the George and Ira Gershwin Songbook (1959), it was sung as a ballad arranged by Nelson Riddle.

== Recorded versions ==
- Carl Fenton and His Orchestra – recorded on December 11, 1924 (Brunswick)
- Paul Whiteman and His Orchestra – rec. December 29, 1924 (Victor)
- Cliff "Ukulele Ike" Edwards – rec. January 2, 1925
- Jack Hylton and his Orchestra – rec. March 29, 1926
- Buddy Lee with the Gilt–Edged Four – rec. May 17, 1926 (Columbia)
- Buck and Bubbles – rec. December 26, 1933 (Columbia)
- Django Reinhardt - (1934, 1937, 1948)
- Red Norvo and His Swing Sextet – (Mar 16, 1936)
- Benny Goodman Trio – rec. April 27, 1936 as the B–side of China Boy (Victor)
- Jones-Smith Incorporated (feat. Lester Young and Count Basie) - rec. October 9, 1936 - released as Vocalion 3459, matrix C-1660-1
- Slim & Slam – rec. May 3, 1938 (Vocalion)
- Count Basie – rec. February 4, 1939 (Decca)
- Artie Shaw and his Orchestra - rec. August 27, 1939 - from the short Artie Shaw's Symphony In Swing (1939) - released as Bluebird B10430-A, matrix 042609-1
- Charlie Parker and Lester Young for Jazz at the Philharmonic, January 28, 1946
- Ella Fitzgerald – with Bob Haggart (1947)
- Fred Astaire – rec. December 1952 – The Astaire Story
- The Gordons with Dizzy Gillespie and Stuff Smith – rec. April 17, 1957
- Ella Fitzgerald – rec. 1959 – Ella Fitzgerald Sings the George and Ira Gershwin Songbook
- Kenny Burrell – rec. August 25, 1959 – On View at the Five Spot Cafe (Blue Note)
- Joe Carroll – The Man with the Happy Sound (1962)
- Mel Tormé and Buddy Rich – Together Again: For the First Time (1978)
- Rob Agerbeek – Three of a Kind (1998)
- Dianne Reeves – We All Love Ella: Celebrating the First Lady of Song (2007)
- BBC Concert Orchestra – The Age of Swing (2009)
- John Wilson Orchestra– Gershwin in Hollywood, live at the Royal Albert Hall (2016)
- Peacherine Ragtime Society Orchestra – with William Edwards – Take Me to the Rag Time Dance (2023)

== See also ==
- List of 1920s jazz standards
