= Roll 'Em Pete =

1939 song performed by Big Joe Turner

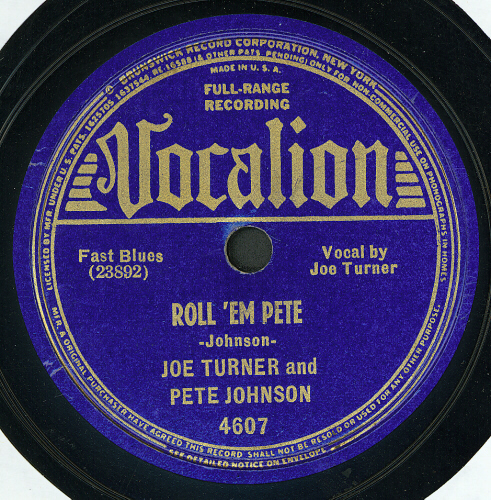

Single by Joe Turner & Pete Johnson
- Released: 1939
- Recorded: December 30, 1938
- Genre: Boogie-woogie
- Length: 2:50
- Label: Vocalion 4607
- Songwriters: Joe Turner, Pete Johnson

"Roll 'Em Pete" is a boogie-woogie song, originally recorded in December 1938 by singer Big Joe Turner and pianist Pete Johnson. The recording is regarded as one of the most important precursors of what later became known as rock and roll.

"Roll 'Em Pete" was inducted into the Blues Hall of Fame in 2018, as one of the five new entrants in the "Classic of Blues Recording (Song)" category.

== Original recording ==
Johnson was a boogie-woogie pianist in Kansas City, who in the early 1930s had developed a partnership with Turner, who was working at the time as a club bartender. The two would regularly perform as a duo at the clubs where Turner worked, with Turner shouting blues rhymes over Johnson's piano playing. In 1938, the pair were invited by music promoter and producer John Hammond to the first From Spirituals to Swing concert at Carnegie Hall in New York City. At the concert they recorded a version of the song under the title “It’s Alright Baby”.

While in New York, Turner and Johnson had a session with the Vocalion record company, recording the 12-bar blues "Roll 'Em Pete" on December 30, 1938. The song was an up-tempo boogie woogie which had become Johnson's signature tune in the Kansas City clubs. In performance, Turner often included many well-rehearsed blues verses, or improvised lyrics, to extend the performance for an hour or more.

According to Paul Oliver, the recording "features spectacular piano playing by Johnson and a forceful vocal by Turner in the style he made famous - half-shouted and with repetitive phrases building up tension at the close." Larry Birnbaum wrote that:

".."Roll 'Em Pete may well be regarded as the first rock'n'roll record. Although earlier songs contain elements of rock'n'roll, "Roll 'Em Pete" is a full-fledged rocker in all but instrumentation ... Johnson's bass line is a simple Chuck Berry-like chug, and his furious right hand embellishments anticipate Berry's entire guitar style. Some of Turner's verses are the stuff that rock is made of ... But others are too mature for teenage listeners. If anything, Turner's brilliant phrasing and Johnson's breathtaking keyboard technique are too sophisticated for rock'n'roll; the music has yet to be formularized for mass consumption."

After Vocalion became a subsidiary of Columbia Records in 1938, the original recording of "Roll 'Em Pete" was released in 1941 as part of a four-record compilation album entitled Boogie Woogie (Columbia album C44).

"Roll 'Em Pete" contained one of the earliest recorded examples of a back beat; the song is also notable for its use of straight rhythm – well into the 1950s, most, if not all, similar recordings were played in shuffle rhythm. Turner later recorded many other versions, with various combinations of musicians, over the ensuing years, particularly in the 1950s when he became a star of rock and roll.

== Later versions ==
The tune was later recorded by many other artists, including:

- Albert Ammons
- Bill Wyman on his 2004 album Just for a Thrill
- Chuck Berry
- Count Basie & Joe Williams on their 1956 album Count Basie Swings, Joe Williams Sings
- Harry James released a live version in 1966 on his album Live At The Riverboat (Dot DLP 3728 and DLP 25728)
- Jimmy Witherspoon
- Lionel Hampton
- Lou Rawls on his 1963 album Black and Blue
- Rob Agerbeek on his 1998 album Three of a Kind
- T-Bone Walker
- The Blasters
