= Red One =

Red One and variants may refer to:

== Arts and entertainment ==
=== Film and television ===
- Red One (film), a 2024 Christmas film starring Dwayne Johnson
- Red One, a character from Choudenshi Bioman
- The Red One, a fictional spacecraft from the Lilo & Stitch franchise

=== Music ===
- RedOne (born 1972), Moroccan-Swedish international record producer
- The Red One (album), a 1997 album by Little Willie Littlefield
- Remedy (The Red One), a 2001 album by the Christian rock band Remedy Drive
- Red1, a member of hip hop group Rascalz
- "Red 1", a 1994 single by Dave Clarke

== Works ==
- "The Red One", a short story by Jack London
- The Red One, a character from The Red Book by Carl Jung
- Red One (comics), a 2015 publication by Image Comics, story by Xavier Dorison, art and cover by Rachel Dodson, Terry Dodson

== Other ==
- Red One (camera), released in 2007 by Red Digital Cinema Camera Company
- Red one calls to UK ambulance services

== See also ==
- The Big Red One, a 1980 film
- "The Big Red One", nickname for the 1st Infantry Division (United States)
