= Houseparty (Little Willie Littlefield album) =

Studio album by Little Willie Littlefield
- Released: 1982
- Recorded: June 1982
- Genre: Piano blues, boogie-woogie
- Label: Oldie Blues
- Producer: Martin van Olderen

Little Willie Littlefield chronology
Little Willie Littlefield Vol.2 (1981)	Houseparty (1982)	I'm in the Mood (1983)

Houseparty is a studio album by American R&B and boogie-woogie pianist and vocalist Little Willie Littlefield.

== Content ==
The album was recorded at The Farmsound Studio in Heelsum in the Netherlands in June 1982 and released in 1982 on the Dutch record label Oldie Blues (OL 8003). The album was produced by Martin van Olderen.

== Track listing ==
Side one

1. "Beggin'"
2. "Houseparty"
3. "Honky Tonk Train Blues"
4. "Just Relax"
5. "Chief Boogie Woogie"
6. "Raining"
7. "Swanee River Boogie"

Side two

1. "Farmsound Boogie"
2. "San Antonio Rose"
3. "Holland Boogie Wiggle"
4. "Walking Through The Streets"
5. "There's Good Rocking Tonight"
6. "After Hours"
7. "Willie Rolls the Boogie"

== Personnel ==
- Little Willie Littlefield – piano, vocals
- Tony Littlefield – vocals
- Harry Noordhof – bass
- Diederik van Hamersveld – drums
