= Rumpelstilz =

- 1773 Rumpelstilz, a main-belt asteroid
- Polo Hofer § Rumpelstilz, a Swiss pop music group

See also:

- Rumpelstilzchen, German name of Rumpelstiltskin
