= Three of a Kind (album) =

Studio album by Rob Agerbeek
- Released: 1998
- Recorded: May 1998
- Genre: Boogie-woogie, Early jazz
- Length: 56:42
- Label: Oldie Blues
- Producer: Martin van Olderen

Rob Agerbeek chronology
Full House (1994)	Three of a Kind (1998)	That's all (2004)

Professional ratings
Review scores
Source	Rating
Rate Your Music	4.5/5 stars
Muziekweb	4.6 stars on a 5 point scale

Three of a Kind is an album by Dutch boogie-woogie and jazz pianist Rob Agerbeek.

== Content ==
The album was recorded in May 1998 at The Farmsound Studio in Heelsum in the Netherlands and released in 1998 on the Dutch record label Oldie Blues (OLCD 7112). Of the eighteen songs on this CD six were written by Agerbeek. "Song for Martin" was dedicated to Martin van Olderen, the producer for this album.

== Track listing ==
1. "Boogie Woogie at the Civic Opera"
2. "Barrelhouse Boogie"
3. "Yancey Special"
4. "Lock Stock and Barrel"
5. "Jammin' the Boogie"
6. "Suitcase Blues"
7. "Lazy Left Hand"
8. "Meade's Stomp"
9. "Shout for Joy"
10. "I Wish I Knew How It Would Feel to Be Free"
11. "Glendale Glide"
12. "Song for Martin"
13. "Little Man Boogie"
14. "Chicago on My Mind"
15. "Roll 'Em Pete"
16. "Oh, Lady Be Good"
17. "Bottomland Boogie"
18. "Perdido Boogie"

== Personnel ==
- Rob Agerbeek - piano
- Harry Emmery - bass
- Ben Schröder - drums
