= I'm in the Mood (album) =

- LP release cover

Studio album by Little Willie Littlefield
- Released: 1983
- Recorded: 1983
- Genre: Piano blues; Boogie-woogie
- Label: Oldie Blues
- Producer: Martin van Olderen

Little Willie Littlefield chronology
| Houseparty (1982) | I'm in the Mood (1983) | Jump with Little Willie Littlefield (1984) |

Professional ratings
Review scores
| Source | Rating |
|---|---|
| Allmusic | 4/5 stars |
| Muziekweb | 4/5 stars |

I'm in the Mood is a studio album by American R&B and Boogie-woogie pianist and vocalist Little Willie Littlefield.

== Content ==
The album was recorded in 1983 at The Farmsound Studio in Heelsum in the Netherlands and released on the Oldie Blues label as OL 8006. An expanded version of the LP was released on CD in 1993 as OLCD 7002 containing tracks from I'm in the Mood and Houseparty. Original LP and CD are produced by Martin van Olderen.

== Track listings and formats ==
Original LP release
| No. | Title | Length |
|---|---|---|
| 1. | "Then I Wonder" |
| 2. | "Ain't a Better Story to Be Told" |
| 3. | "Jump the Boogie (Instrumental)" |
| 4. | "Riffin' Along" |
| 5. | "See See Rider" |
| 6. | "Found My Baby" |
| 7. | "Little Willie's Boogie (Instrumental)" |
| 8. | "One More Drink" |
| 9. | "Rollin' the Basses (Instrumental)" |
| 10. | "A Little Cure" |
| 11. | "The Breeze (Instrumental)" |
| 12. | "Jive at Five" |
| 13. | "Boogie Woogie Playgirl (Instrumental)" |

CD reissue (Extended version including Houseparty)
| No. | Title | Length |
|---|---|---|
| 1. | "Farmsound Boogie" |
| 2. | "Houseparty" |
| 3. | "Holland Boogie Wiggle" |
| 4. | "Beggin'" |
| 5. | "Chief Boogie Woogie" |
| 6. | "Raining" |
| 7. | "Walking through the Streets" |
| 8. | "Just Relax" |
| 9. | "Willie Rolls the Boogie Woogie" |
| 10. | "Then I Wonder" |
| 11. | "Jump the Boogie Woogie" |
| 12. | "Rollin' the Basses" |
| 13. | "Boogie Woogie Playgirl" |
| 14. | "The Breeze" |
| 15. | "Little Willie's Boogie" |
| 16. | "Ain't a Better Story to Be Told" |
| 17. | "Riffin' Along" |
| 18. | "One More Drink" |
| 19. | "Found My Baby" |
| 20. | "A Little Cure" |
| 21. | "Jive at Five" |

== Personnel ==
- Little Willie Littlefield – piano, vocals
- Tony Littlefield – vocals
- Harry Noordhof – bass
- Diederik van Hamersveld, Han Bennink – drums
- Jan Cees Tans – tenor sax
