= Singalong with Little Willie Littlefield =

Studio album by Little Willie Littlefield
- Released: 1990
- Recorded: 1987
- Genre: Piano blues, boogie-woogie
- Length: 0:59:18
- Label: Oldie Blues
- Producer: Job Zomer

Little Willie Littlefield chronology
| Little Willie Littlefield Plays the Boogie Woogie (1988) | Singalong with Little Willie Littlefield (1990) | Little Willie Littlefield ... Goes Rhythm'n Blues (1992) |

Singalong with Little Willie Littlefield is a studio album by American R&B and Boogie-woogie pianist and vocalist Little Willie Littlefield.

== Content ==
The album was recorded in 1987 at The Farmsound Studio in Heelsum in the Netherlands and released in 1990 on the Dutch record label Oldie Blues (OLCD 7001). The album was produced by Job Zomer.

== Track listing ==
1. "Love Letters in the Sand"
2. "Sentimental Journey"
3. "On the Sunny Side of the Street"
4. "Frankie and Johnny"
5. "Don't Fence Me In"
6. "Misty"
7. "Pretty Brown Eyes"
8. "What a Wonderful World"
9. "Houston"
10. "Looking Back"
11. "Bad Bad Leroy Brown"
12. "Mona Lisa"
13. "Take These Chains from My Heart"
14. "Moon Over Naples – Spanish Eyes"
15. "When I Fall in Love"
16. "Brahms' Lullaby"
17. "Tennessee Waltz"
18. "Blueberry Hill"

== Personnel ==
- Little Willie Littlefield – piano, vocals
- Arthur Smit – keyboard bass, electric guitar
- Harry Noordhof – bass
- Job Zomer – clarinet, tenor sax, drums
