= San Antonio Rose =

1939 single by Bob Wills

Single by Bob Wills and His Texas Playboys
- B-side: "The Convict And The Rose"
- Published: June 5, 1940 by Irving Berlin, Inc.
- Released: April 1939
- Recorded: November 28, 1938
- Studio: Dallas, Texas
- Genre: Western swing
- Length: 2:35
- Label: Vocalion; 04755
- Songwriter: Bob Wills

Bob Wills and His Texas Playboys singles chronology
"Whoa Babe" (1939)	"San Antonio Rose" (1939)	"Liza Pull Down the Shades" (1939)

"New San Antonio Rose"

Single by Bob Wills and His Texas Playboys
- B-side: "Bob Wills' Special"
- Released: August 1940
- Recorded: April 16, 1940
- Studio: Burrus Sawmill Studio, Saginaw, Texas
- Genre: Western swing
- Length: 2:37
- Label: Okeh; 05694
- Songwriter: Bob Wills

Bob Wills and His Texas Playboys singles chronology
"Lone Star Rag" (1940)	"New San Antonio Rose" (1940)	"Time Changes Everything" (1940)

"San Antonio Rose" is a swing instrumental introduced in late 1938 by Bob Wills and His Texas Playboys. Quickly becoming the band's most popular number, Wills and band members devised lyrics, which were recorded on April 16, 1940, and released on Okeh 5694 in August as "New San Antonio Rose". Despite having completed a lengthy Hillbilly/Folk chart run in 1939, which culminated at number one, it quickly rose to the top again, in early 1941. It went on to become the band's theme song for the next 40 years, reverting to its original title.

The song is written in the first person with the "Rose of San Antone" being the singer's lost love. In 2010, the Western Writers of America ranked it at number 49 on its list of the top 100 Western songs of all time.

== Recordings ==
While it was also a successful hit for other hillbilly artists, it also broke through to the pop charts, where Bing Crosby's version reached number seven on December 16, 1940. Over a million copies were sold, for which he was awarded a gold disc.

The song was the third dominating hit by Wills in the Western swing field over five years. "Spanish Two Step" was second to only "Mexicali Rose" in 1936, "Steel Guitar Rag" topped the 1937 chart, and this one finished in the top 10 in 1939 and 1940. The Texas Playboys finished with 13 number-one chart hits.

The song, both the music and lyrics, reflects the Mexican influence Bob Wills found growing up in the Southwest. Wills developed the melody of the original "San Antonio Rose" itself from a traditional tune, "Spanish Two Step", by playing the bridge in reverse.

"New San Antonio Rose" ruffled the feathers of Southern country music moguls when Wills and the Playboys performed it with horns and a drum at the Grand Ole Opry on December 30, 1944.

== Film appearances ==
- 1941: San Antonio Rose
- 1982: Honkytonk Man
- 1985: Sweet Dreams – sung by Patsy Cline

== Cover versions ==
The song has been recorded by many artists in several genres.

- The pseudonymous Jericho wrote the Swedish lyrics. A Swedish version was recorded by Ingalill Rossvald and Harry Brandelius with Thorsten Sjögren's orchestra in Stockholm on February 7, 1952. It was released on the 78 rpm record His Master's Voice X 7795.
- American pianist Floyd Cramer had his version go to number eight on both the Billboard Hot 100 pop and country singles charts in 1961.
- In 1966, Harry James released a version on his album Harry James and His Western Friends (Dot DLP 3735 and 25735)
- American rhythm and blues and boogie-woogie pianist and singer Little Willie Littlefield recorded a version for his 1982 album Houseparty.
- Other notable recordings are by Patsy Cline, Asleep at the Wheel, Clint Eastwood, Floyd Cramer, Gene Autry, Gordon MacRae, Jo Stafford, the Mills Brothers, Pat Boone, Patti Page, John Denver, Steve Lawrence, Teresa Brewer, and Don Wilkerson.

== Other uses ==
It lends its name to San Antonio Rose Palace in San Antonio, Texas, owned by George Strait.

Tish Hinojosa's "San Antonio Romeo", on her album Culture Swing, provides Rose's side of the story.

The song is also referenced several times in Tennessee Williams' one-act play, "Auto-Da-Fé".
