= Change of Address (Krokus album) =

Studio album by Krokus
- Released: 16 June 1986
- Recorded: September 1985 – May 1986
- Studios: Artisan Sound Recorders, Hollywood, California and mixed at Cherokee Studios, Hollywood
- Genres: Hard rock; heavy metal; glam metal
- Length: 41:03
- Label: Arista
- Producers: Tom Werman, Fernando von Arb

Krokus chronology
The Blitz (1984)	Change of Address (1986)	Alive and Screamin' (1986)

Singles from Change of Address
- 1. "School's Out" Released: June 1986 (US); 2. "Say Goodbye" Released: 1986 (Europe); 3. "Let This Love Begin" Released: February 1987 (US)

Professional ratings
Review scores
Source	Rating
AllMusic	1.5/5 stars
Collector's Guide to Heavy Metal	3/10

Change of Address is the ninth studio album by Swiss hard rock band Krokus, and is largely seen as their least successful. It has been described as "plainly one of the worst efforts" from Krokus, and the band's website claims that they and their musical style were put under too much pressure from their record company. Unsurprisingly, Krokus changed their record label for their next studio album, Heart Attack.

The album features drummer Jeff Klaven's former Cobra bandmate, Tommy Keiser, joining on bass, enabling Mark Kohler to return to his original position on rhythm guitar.

Andrew T of metal band Blackout filled in for Kohler on select dates during this tour, including a stint replacing Bon Jovi as openers on Judas Priest's 1986 arena tour. Unusually, Krokus rarely played any songs from the then current album when opening for Priest.

== Track listing ==
All tracks are written by Fernando von Arb, Jeff Klaven and Marc Storace except where noted.

Side A
No.	Title	Writer(s)	Length
1.	"Now (All Through the Night)"		4:23
2.	"Hot Shot City"	Tommy Keiser, Mark Kohler, Klaven, Storace	3:48
3.	"School's Out" (Alice Cooper cover)	Alice Cooper, Michael Bruce, Glen Buxton, Dennis Dunaway, Neal Smith	3:16
4.	"Let This Love Begin"	von Arb, Klaven	5:02
5.	"Burning Up the Night"	von Arb, Storace	3:46

Side B
No.	Title	Length
6.	"Say Goodbye"	5:18
7.	"World on Fire"	6:12
8.	"Hard Luck Hero"	4:12
9.	"Long Way from Home"	5:06

== Personnel ==
Krokus

- Marc Storace – vocals
- Fernando von Arb – lead guitar, co-producer
- Mark Kohler – rhythm guitar
- Tommy Keiser – bass
- Jeff Klaven – drums, percussion

Additional musicians

- Paul Fox – keyboards on certain tracks
- Jai Winding – keyboards on certain tracks
- Leon Gaer – bass
- Allan Holdsworth – guitar solo on track 9
- David Mansfield – acoustic guitar
- 'The Brat Choir' with Nina Werman and friends – backing vocals on track 3
- Tom Kelly, Tommy Funderburk, Bob Garlyle – backing vocals

Production

- Tom Werman – producer, mixing at Cherokee Studios, Hollywood, California
- Duane Baron – engineer
- Peter Barker – assistant engineer
- David Eaton – mixing assistant
- Jürg Naegeli – pre-production engineer at Pink Tonstudios, Zuchwil, Switzerland

== Charts ==
=== Album ===
Chart (1986)	Peak position
Canada Top Albums/CDs (RPM)	77
Finnish Albums (The Official Finnish Charts)	34
Swedish Albums (Sverigetopplistan)	46
Swiss Albums (Schweizer Hitparade)	6
US Billboard 200	45

=== Singles ===
Year	Title	Chart	Position
1986	"School's Out"	Billboard Hot 100	67
