= Screaming in the Night =

- Cover for the 1986 release

Single by Krokus

from the album Headhunter
- Released: May 1983
- Studio: Bee Jay Studios, Orlando, Florida, USA
- Genre: Hard rock; heavy metal; glam metal
- Length: 6:44 (album version); 4:12 (radio edit)
- Label: Arista
- Songwriters: Marc Storace; Fernando von Arb; Mark Kohler; Chris von Rohr; Steve Pace
- Producer: Tom Allom

Krokus singles chronology
"Stayed Awake All Night" (1983)	"Screaming in the Night" (1983)	"Eat the Rich" (1983)

Music video
- "Screaming in the Night" on YouTube

"Screaming in the Night" is a song by Swiss hard rock band Krokus. The power ballad was released in May 1983 as the second single from their seventh studio album, Headhunter. The song peaked at number 21 on the Billboard Mainstream Rock chart in July 1983 and remained on the chart for 12 weeks. Upon release, "Screaming in the Night" became the band's biggest hit, which it remains.

The single was originally released in 1983 as 7-inch and 12-inch formats. A special edition 12-inch single was released in 1986 to promote the live album Alive and Screamin'.

== Music video ==
A music video was released in 1983 and put in rotation on MTV. Like the video for "Eat The Rich", it was shot in San Francisco's Baker Beach in early 1983.

A live music video was released for the song to promote the 1986 single release.

== Track listing ==
7" vinyl
No.	Title	Length
1.	"Screaming in the Night" (radio edit)	4:12
2.	"Russian Winter"	3:31

1983 12" vinyl
No.	Title	Length
1.	"Screaming in the Night" (album version)	6:44
2.	"Screaming in the Night" (radio edit)	4:12

1986 12" vinyl
No.	Title	Length
1.	"Screaming in the Night" (live album version)	6:00
2.	"Screaming in the Night" (original studio version)	6:44
3.	"Headhunter" (live album version)	4:45

== Personnel ==
=== Headhunter version ===
- Marc Storace – vocals
- Fernando von Arb – lead guitar
- Mark Kohler – rhythm guitar
- Chris von Rohr – bass
- Steve Pace – drums
- Jimi Jamison - backing vocals

=== Alive and Screamin' version ===
- Marc Storace – vocals
- Fernando von Arb – lead guitar
- Mark Kohler – rhythm guitar
- Tommy Keiser – bass
- Jeff Klaven – drums
