= The Red One (album) =

Studio album by Little Willie Littlefield
- Released: 1997
- Recorded: June 1997
- Genre: Piano blues, boogie-woogie
- Length: 51:46
- Label: Oldie Blues
- Producer: Martin van Olderen

Little Willie Littlefield chronology
Going Back to Kay Cee (1995)	The Red One (1997)	Kat on the Keys (1999)

Professional ratings
Review scores
Source	Rating
Allmusic	4/5 stars
Muziekweb	3.3 stars on a 5-point scale

The Red One is a studio album by American R&B and Boogie-woogie pianist and vocalist Little Willie Littlefield.

== Content ==
The album was recorded in June 1997 at The Farmsound Studio in Heelsum in the Netherlands and released in 1998 on the Dutch record label Oldie Blues (OLCD 7005). The album was produced by Martin van Olderen.

== Track listing ==
1. "Here We Go Again"
2. "Willie's Boogie Woogie Blues"
3. "I Wonder"
4. "Sea Cruise"
5. "The Red One"
6. "Drifting Blues"
7. "Get Your Kicks on Route 66"
8. "Boogie Woogie Jam"
9. "Blues at Sunrise"
10. "Caldonia"
11. "Wooden Heart Boogie"
12. "Rhumba Blues"
13. "Tribute to the Count"
14. "Piano Roll Blues"
15. "Down by the Riverside"
16. "Little Willie's Boogie"
17. "Thunder and Rumble"
18. "Call Him Mr. Blues"
19. "Chief's 40 Years Anniversary "Oldie'Blues" Boogie"

== Personnel ==
- Little Willie Littlefield – piano, vocals
- Tony Littlefield – vocals
- Rob Langereis – bass
- Louis Debij – drums
- Job Zomer, Huub Jacobs – tenor sax
