= The Blitz (Krokus album) =

Studio album by Krokus
- Released: August 1984
- Studios: Little Mountain Sound (Vancouver, Canada)
- Genres: Hard rock; heavy metal; glam metal
- Length: 38:34
- Label: Arista
- Producer: Bruce Fairbairn

Krokus chronology
Headhunter (1983)	The Blitz (1984)	Change of Address (1986)

Singles from The Blitz
- 1. "Ballroom Blitz" Released: August 1984 (UK); 2. "Midnite Maniac" Released: 15 September 1984 (US)

Professional ratings
Review scores
Source	Rating
AllMusic	3/5 stars
Collector's Guide to Heavy Metal	4/10

The Blitz is the eighth studio album by Swiss hard rock band Krokus, released in August 1984. It achieved Gold status in the US. When preparing to record the album, the band tapped Patrick Mahassen to join on guitar, with Mark Kohler switching to bass, however, Mahassen ended up leaving the band before recording commenced. The album was ultimately recorded as a quartet; Andy Tanas played bass on the subsequent tour.

The band hit the Billboard Hot 100 with "Midnite Maniac" becoming the first Swiss act to do so. The song "Boys Nite Out", written by Bryan Adams and Jim Vallance, was originally recorded by Adams for his 1984 album Reckless but was left off until its 30th anniversary reissue.

UK-based company Rock Candy Records reissued the album on CD in 2014.

== Track listing ==
All tracks are written by Fernando von Arb and Marc Storace, except where noted.

Side A
No.	Title	Writer(s)	Length
1.	"Midnite Maniac"		3:59
2.	"Out of Control"		4:15
3.	"Boys Nite Out"	Bryan Adams, Jim Vallance, Storace, Von Arb	3:38
4.	"Our Love"		4:35
5.	"Out to Lunch"		4:20

Side B
No.	Title	Writer(s)	Length
6.	"Ballroom Blitz" (Sweet cover)	Nicky Chinn, Michael Chapman	4:00
7.	"Rock the Nation"		4:41
8.	"Hot Stuff"		4:36
9.	"Ready to Rock"		4:30

== Personnel ==
Krokus

- Marc Storace – vocals
- Fernando von Arb – lead guitar, rhythm guitar
- Mark Kohler – bass
- Jeff Klaven – drums, percussion

Additional musicians

- Doug Johnson – keyboards
- Jimi Jamison – backing vocals on "Our Love"

Production

- Bruce Fairbairn – producer
- Bob Rock, Bob Ketchum – engineers
- Mike Fraser – assistant engineer
- Phil Burnett – mixing
- George Marino – mastering

== Charts ==
=== Album ===
Chart (1984)	Peak position
Canada Top Albums/CDs (RPM)	83
German Albums (Offizielle Top 100)	55
Swedish Albums (Sverigetopplistan)	27
Swiss Albums (Schweizer Hitparade)	6
Billboard 200 (USA)	36

=== Singles ===
Year	Title	Chart	Position
1984	"Midnite Maniac"	Billboard Hot 100	71

== Certifications ==
Region	Certification	Certified units/sales
Canada (Music Canada)	Gold	50,000^{^}
United States (RIAA)	Gold	500,000^{^}
^{^} Shipments figures based on certification alone.
