= Killer (Swiss band) =

- Origin: Solothurn, Switzerland
- Genres: Hard rock, heavy metal, Glam Metal
- Years active: 1979–1986; 2002; 2005-2007; 2011-2012; 2016-
- Labels: Vertigo, Bellaphon, Rockport, Scratch, Ambitions, Scream, Genco Pura
- Members: Crown Kocher; Patrick Strobel; Peter Berger; Mirko Buccio; Roberto Antonucci
- Past members: Andy Lickford; Emilia Meyer, aka Emi Bassbabe; Rob Strangler; Noisy Miller; Andy Schumacher; Beat 'Easy' Iselin; Dan Hammer; Dave Gugelot; Mich Müller; Roland Wapf; Mark B. Lay; Martin Morelli; Ronny Woolf; Jan van Crow; Danny Crivelli; Mark Broman; Many Maurer; Beat Kofmehl; Ali Allemann
- Website: killer.band

Killer is a Swiss heavy metal group founded in 1979 by guitarist Edgar "Crown" Kocher after a 3-year stint with the band Kaktus. Kocher's trademark is wearing striped prison garb on stage.

Between 1981 and 1986, Killer released 4 studio albums but always remained in the shadows of their more successful Solothurn contemporaries Krokus. After the release of their 1986 album, Young Blood, the band disbanded. Kocher re-activated the group for the first time in 2002 and has continued with Killer off and on ever since despite health problems and frequent line-up changes. On May 25, 2019, Killer released Screamgunn, their first new album in 33 years.

== Biography ==
The original Killer line-up consisted of Kocher, co-guitarist Many Maurer, vocalist Mark Broman (ex-Kaktus), bassist Beat Kofmehl, and drummer Ali Allemann which debuted in 1981 with the "Crazy Daisy" 7", co-produced by Krokus bassist Chris von Rohr and Martin Pearson. The same configuration also recorded the band's first two studio albums, Ladykiller (1981), whose controversial front cover was censored and brought the band much in the way of publicity, and Thriller (1982). Killer was invited to appear on Musikladen, a leading German music TV show, and supported Motörhead in Germany and Switzerland in late 1982. The group also made a Swiss TV appearance on TSI with "Ladykiller".

1983's Stronger Than Ever saw the addition of former Detroit members, guitarist Jan van Crow and drummer Danny Crivelli, in place of Crown Kocher and Ali Allemann. Allemann had lost interest and quit while Kocher's exit was due to internal strife following the band's show at Salle des Spectacles in Servion, Vaud which was filmed for broadcast on Télévision Suisse Romande (TSR). Once again, Killer toured with Motörhead to support the album but temporarily disbanded in 1984. In 1985, guitarist Jan van Crow formed a whole new line-up recruiting vocalist Marc B. Lay, bassist Martin Morelli, drummer Ronny Woolf, and keyboardist Roland Wapf for what turned out to be the group's swan song, Young Blood.

=== Post-Killer activities ===
Meanwhile, Killer founding members Many Maurer and Beat Kofmehl joined forces with Witchcraft/Blood Six vocalist Peter Tanner and drummer Greg Bleuel under the name Headhunter, which resulted in the band's eponymous 1985 release, produced by then former Krokus bassist Chris von Rohr.

Maurer and yet another Killer alum, Danny Crivelli, would both appear on von Rohr's 1987 solo album, Hammer & Tongue (re-issued in 1993 as The Good, The Bad and The Dog in the wake of von Rohr's autobiography, "Hunde wollt ihr ewig rocken"), which led to von Rohr re-joining Krokus for the Heart Attack album, taking Crivelli with him to be the band's new drummer. On April 21, 2013, it was reported that Crivelli had died. According to the German language Swiss daily Blick, Crivelli fell off a bridge to his death in Trimbach, Canton of Solothurn.

Beat, now Brian, Kofmehl would replace the Gotthard bound Marc Lynn in the band China in time to record their Stephan Galfas produced 1989 sophomore album, Sign in the Sky. It would reach Nr. 2 on the Swiss album charts and was gold certified. The band supported the album with an extensive European tour as opening act for Yngwie Malmsteen. Kofmehl took part in the China reunion in 2007 and played bass on the band's 2010 comeback effort, Light Up the Dark.

Many Maurer became a member of Krokus throughout the 1990s, co-writing, co-producing as well as playing guitar and bass on Stampede, To Rock or Not to Be, and Round 13. Maurer also co-wrote, with Chris von Rohr, the song "Get Down" on Gotthard's self-titled 1992 debut album. Another co-write with von Rohr, "Sweet Little Rock'n'Roller", appeared on Gotthard's 1996 album, G.. Both songs originally appeared on von Rohr's Hammer & Tongue album. Maurer also recorded Read Your Mind (1996) with the band Ain't Dead Yet which featured two more latter day Krokus alumni, drummer Peter Haas and bassist Tony Castell. That same year, Crown Kocher's party cover band, Pure Dynamite, recorded a 3-song EP, "That's Röck'n'Röll", co-produced by Maurer.

=== One-off reunion and further band activities ===
Kocher would resurrect Killer several times in the 2000s with different personnel - including a one-off all original members reunion on April 27, 2002, in their hometown of Solothurn - but disbanded it in 2012 out of frustration over poor concert attendances and lack of progress on a new album as well as persistent health problems.

While Killer sputtered, Kocher re-connected with his old Kaktus bandmate, Duco Aeschbach, a reunion that produced two albums, Rocking Blood (2008) and No Time to Die (2012). Kocher left Kaktus in 2013 after the band lost their lead vocalist.

As of 2016, Killer, led by Kocher and vocalist Andy Lickford, was active again and released a 4-song EP, Pure Dynamite, which includes the 1981 band classic, "Crystal Butterfly", as a CD bonus track. A promotional video for the title track was released in 2012 in anticipation of a new album which would not see the light of day for another 7 years. On May 25, 2019, the current Killer line-up comprising Crown Kocher, lead vocalist Patrick Strobel, guitarist Peter Berger, bassist Mirko Buccio, and drummer Roberto Antonucci released Screamgunn, the group's first new album since 1986's Young Blood. A record release party show took place at P-9 in Biberist, Switzerland during which the original members of Killer were presented with gold plaques for sales in excess of 25.000 copies of their 1981 debut, Ladykiller.

In 2018, Kocher released the single "Let Me Take You In My Arms" under the project name Crown, also featuring Killer bassist Mirko Buccio, Kaktus drummer Duco Aeschbach, and vocalist Jean-Marc Viller whose credits include Swiss acts Big Red One, Neverland, and Daydreamer.

== Discography ==
=== Studio albums ===
- 1981: Ladykiller
- 1982: Thriller
- 1983: Stronger Than Ever
- 1986: Young Blood
- 2019: Screamgunn

=== Compilations ===
- 2005: Break My Chains

=== Singles & EPs ===
- 1981: Crazy Daisy
- 1981: Ladykiller
- 1982: Midnight Highway Rider
- 1982: Take Me, Break Me, Shake Me
- 2016: Pure Dynamite
