= TEA (band) =

Swiss rock band

- Origin: Zürich, Switzerland
- Genres: Hard rock, progressive rock
- Years active: 1971–1978, 2009–present
- Labels: Vertigo, Venus, Spalax Music, Retrospect, Farewell Music
- Members: Marc Storace; Armand Volker; Roli Eggli; Chris Egger; Dan Allenspach
- Past members: Turo Pashayan; Philippe Kienholz
- Website: TEA on Facebook

TEA is a Swiss progressive heavy rock band, perhaps best known for featuring lead vocalist Marc Storace before he went on to front Krokus. Between 1974 and 1978, TEA released three studio albums, TEA ('74), The Ship ('75) and Tax Exile ('76), and the Best of Tea Vol. I compilation ('78). In 2009, a career retrospective, Reloaded, was released in conjunction with the band's first live show since 1977.

== History ==
TEA was born out of a jam session in 1971 when founding members Turo Pashayan (ex-Sauterelles) on bass and vocals, Roli Eggli (ex-Fact, Alaska Range) on drums and Armand Volker (ex-New Hue, Tusk) on guitar first got together. Taking the first initial of each of the founders' names, they named their band TEA. They toured Switzerland, Germany and the Netherlands and started to establish a name for themselves. In 1972, Maltese-born singer Marc Storace, who had previously fronted St. Gallen-based Swiss band Deaf, joined the trio. TEA then toured extensively in Switzerland and France.

In 1973, it was rare for Swiss rock bands to get exposure on television, however TEA showcased their talents on the Swiss TV Show "Hits-A-Gogo". In the summer of 1973 the band toured Italy extensively, including five concerts in Florence at the Space Electronic Club. The highlight of the tour was headlining an 8,000 capacity festival in Naples. Later that year, keyboardist Philippe Kienholz (ex-Tusk) joined TEA to complete the line-up. Shortly thereafter, the band signed a contract with Phonogram's progressive imprint, Vertigo. Towards the end of 1973, the band recorded their first album in Dieter Dierks' recording studios in Stommeln, Germany.

In 1974 they released their first single "Good Times" b/w "Judy", both non-album tracks, which later surfaced on the 2009 Reloaded retrospective. The group's eponymous debut album was released in 1974. In support of the album, TEA joined Queen as "special guests" on their first European tour and concerts all over Europe followed. Swiss music magazine POP and their readers voted TEA that year's "Best Group" and individually voted each member of the band as the best in their instrumental or vocal category. The album was voted "Best Album of the Year".

In 1975 their second album, The Ship, was released along with the single "Summer in the City", a cover of The Lovin' Spoonful song. The band also signed a distribution deal in the U.S.; however, before this materialized, the label went out of business. TEA would open up for Status Quo in their native Switzerland in early '75 and toured Europe, including Germany, where they toured as "special guests" with Nazareth. They also embarked on a UK tour, the first Swiss rock band to do so, as "special guests" of the Baker Gurvitz Army playing 23 dates in front of a total audience of 45,000. Leading music magazine Melody Maker wrote in their 8 November 1975 edition: "...fans surprised by the power and energy of TEA, first band from Switzerland to tour Britain. Reports MM's Bob Ellis from London: "I got the same buzz from them I had when I first saw Led Zeppelin. They came on to boos and shouts of "Get back to Switzerland" and after the second number nobody could believe how good they were." Consequently, POP and their readers voted TEA "Best Group" for a second consecutive year and each musician in their respective instrument category also #1 with the exception of keyboardist Philippe Kienholz, who earned #2 place. The Ship was also voted as "Best Album of the Year 1975".

In 1976, Swiss TV invited TEA to play as part of their "Rock Over Switzerland" broadcast. TEA performed "Through Scarlet" from their 1975 release The Ship. There were hardly any TV show opportunities for Swiss rock artists, however TEA clearly established themselves as #1 Swiss rock band. After the previous year's UK tour, TEA returned to Britain, this time headlining over 24 shows, including the legendary Marquee Club in London. In 1976, the third TEA album, Tax Exile, was released along with the single "Alexandra". Tours in support of the new album followed through Switzerland, Germany and Italy and at the end of the year, TEA played four concerts in Malta, Storace's country of origin.

In 1977, TEA played their last concert in Switzerland. Volker became a successful producer and owned a recording studio near Munich. Kienholz worked with Hand in Hand, Walter Lietha, Yello, Andreas Vollenweider, Jo Geilo Heartbreakers, The Bucks and Velvet Field, music teacher at secondary school in Baden (over 5000 Students), own teaching method „Head, hands & feet in Balance", Pashayan worked on solo projects, Eggli founded his own company, and Storace moved to London to form a band called Eazy Money who would contribute "Telephone Man" to the Metal For Muthas Volume II: Cut Loud compilation. In 1979, he joined Krokus, who had supported TEA on their final tour of Switzerland, after he received a call from bassist Chris von Rohr who told him they were looking for a new singer and invited Marc for a weekend jam in Switzerland.

Although TEA did not tour anymore, a Best of Tea Vol. I album was released in 1978. The album included a new, never before released songs called "Queen" and the flip side of the "Summer in the City" single release of 1975, entitled "Hold Me, Save Me". With the release of this album the musical legacy of TEA had turned full circle. Spanning over a period of 7 years, totaling 250 concerts, 150 of them abroad, TEA became part of Swiss rock history and the first Swiss band to conquer Europe. In 2005, TEA were featured in the 4-part TV series "Rockumentation – 50 Jahre Rock in der Schweiz" documenting Swiss rock history.

Sometime in 2007, Eggli, Volker and Storace started entertaining the thought of a possible continuation of TEA. This all happened before Krokus decided to reunite in its original formation. With Krokus touring less but playing larger venues, Storace felt he could handle his involvement in both bands. Rehearsals started with this trio; Kienholz was invited to join but declined the offer to continue working on his own musical projects. Bassist Turo Pashayan was nowhere to be found despite the band's persistent search. This might be a result of the fact that Pashayan was detained in Switzerland on the basis of false pretenses as investigations have unveiled and he will be indemnified.

32 years after they played their last concert and 31 years after the Best of Tea Vol. I album release, TEA re-introduced themselves to the public with Reloaded, a retrospective of their 1970s work, issued on 4 November 2009.

On 1 December 2009, TEA played their first showcase concert since 1977 at the Mascotte Club in Zurich to a crowd of music lovers and press. They were well received and many were amazed how good the band sounded after all these years. The TEA originals Volker, Eggli and Storace were joined by Chris Egger, who replaced Kienholz, and Dan Allenspach on bass. TEA made their return to Malta in 2010 where Storace was inducted into Malta's own Walk of Fame with a hand print in cement during a ceremony in his honour at Celebrity Street.

The band's first two albums, TEA and The Ship, were re-issued on CD by French company Spalax Music in 2000 and 1998, respectively. Tax Exile was released on CD by U.S. label Retrospect in 2005.

TEA members Storace, Volker, Allenspach and Eggli are all part of an ensemble of musicians that's been touring Switzerland with "This Is Rock – Die Show mit der Geschichte und den Songs der Rock Giants" (The Show with the History and the Songs of the Giants of Rock) performing classic rock songs from the 1960s to the 1990s. The show, with Eggli as producer and musical director, premiered 29 and 31 December 2018 at the Allmend in Bern.

Eggli and Allenspach are also members of the semi-pro cover band Callaway who have released 3 live albums since the inception of the group in the early 2000s.

== Discography ==
=== Studio albums ===
- 1974: TEA (Vertigo)
- 1975: The Ship (Vertigo)
- 1976: Tax Exile (Vertigo)

=== Compilations ===
- 1978: Best of Tea Vol. I (Venus)
- 2009: Reloaded (Farewell Music)

=== Singles ===
- 1974: Good Times b/w Judy (Vertigo)
- 1975: "Summer in the City" b/w Hold Me, Save Me (Vertigo)
- 1976: Alexandra b/w Winter Days (Vertigo)
