= Rob Hoeke =

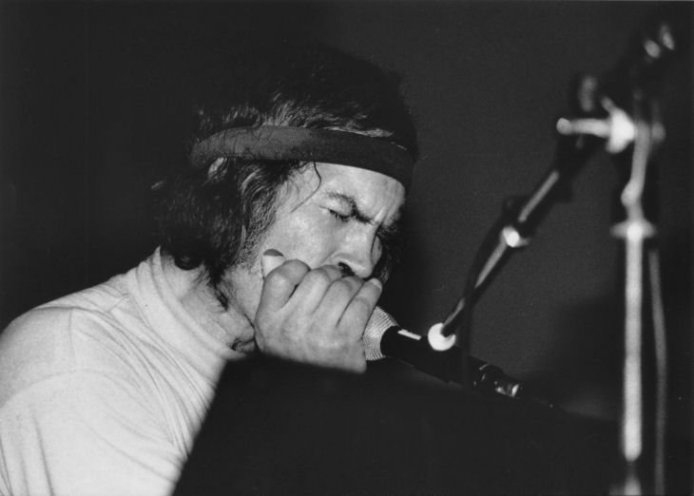

Background information
- Born: Rob Hoeke; 9 January 1939; Haarlem, Netherlands
- Died: 6 November 1999 (aged 60) Krommenie
- Genres: Boogie-woogie, Blues, Soul and Rhythm & Blues
- Occupations: Musician, composer, songwriter, vocalist
- Instrument: Piano
- Years active: 1957–1999
- Labels: Philips, Polydor, Universe, Oldie Blues, Down South Records, Rodero Records
- Formerly of: Rob Hoeke Boogie Woogie Quartet, The Rob Hoeke Rhythm and Blues Group, The Grand Piano Boogie Train

Rob Hoeke (9 January 1939 – 6 November 1999) was a Dutch singer, pianist, composer and songwriter most famous for his renditions in the field of Boogie-woogie releasing over 20 albums. Besides that he played and recorded in a musical variety of styles ranging from Blues, Soul, Rock and Rhythm & Blues.

== Biography ==
Rob Hoeke's most successful period was in the second half of the 1960s and early 1970s with his Rob Hoeke Rhythm & Blues Group. He scored hits with "Margio" (number 12 on the Dutch Top 40 in 1966), "Drinking on My Bed" (number 11 in 1966) and "Down South" which would become Hoeke's signature tune and biggest hit reaching number 6 in 1970. His sole charting album was Four Hands Up, a collaboration with fellow Boogie-woogie artist Hein van der Gaag which charted at number 7 in 1971.

In 1974, Rob Hoeke lost two fingers in a gardening accident and his career all but seemed to be over. After a few years, he started playing and performing for audiences again but his heyday was over. He recorded many more albums, one with Alan Price from the Animals. Hoeke made a solo performance at the first Amsterdam Blues Festival in 1983 where his solo performance received a standing ovation from the audience of 1,100. Subsequently, he made his first solo album Jumpin' on the "88" for the Oldie Blues label in 1983.

Rob Hoeke died in 1999 after a short illness.

== Discography ==
=== Studio albums ===
- Boogie Hoogie – Philips, P12 930 L (1964)
- Save our Souls – Philips, XPY 855 039 (1967)
- Robby's Saloon – Philips, XPY 855 084 (1968)
- Celsius 232,8 – Philips, XPY 855 087 (1969)
- Racing the Boogie – Philips, 861 822 LCY (1970)
- Full Speed – Philips, 6413 032 (1972)
- Rockin' the Boogie – Philips, 6401 053 (1973)
- Boogie Woogie Explosion – Polydor, 2925 086 (1979)
- Free and Easy – Universe, LS – 28 (1981)
- Jumpin' on the "88" – Oldie Blues, OL 8005 (1984)
- & The Real Boogie Woogie – Down South Records, DS 92234 (1987)
- Boogie and Blues – Stiletto, RH 9187 (1987)
- & The Real Boogie Woogie – Down South Records, DS 92234 (1987)
- 25 Years Rhythm & Blues And Boogie Woogie – CNR, 655.290–1 (1989)

=== Live albums ===
- Boogie Woogie en Blues Live – CCS10-1 (1994)
- Boogie Woogie en Blues Live 2 – RH9702 (1997)

=== Collaboration albums ===
- Four Hands Up (with Hein van der Gaag) – Philips, 6413 013 (1971)
- Fingerprints (with Hein van der Gaag) – Philips, 6401 090 (1975)
- Two of a Kind (with Alan Price) – Polydor, 2925 064 (1977)
- Boogie on the Move (The Grand Piano Boogie Train: Jaap Dekker, Rob Hoeke and Rob Agerbeek) – Rodero Records, RDR 1295 (1997)
- Blues & Boogie Movin' On (The Grand Piano Boogie Train: Jaap Dekker, Rob Hoeke and Rob Agerbeek) – Rodero Records, RDR 1297 (1997)
