= Krokus (band) =

Swiss hard rock band

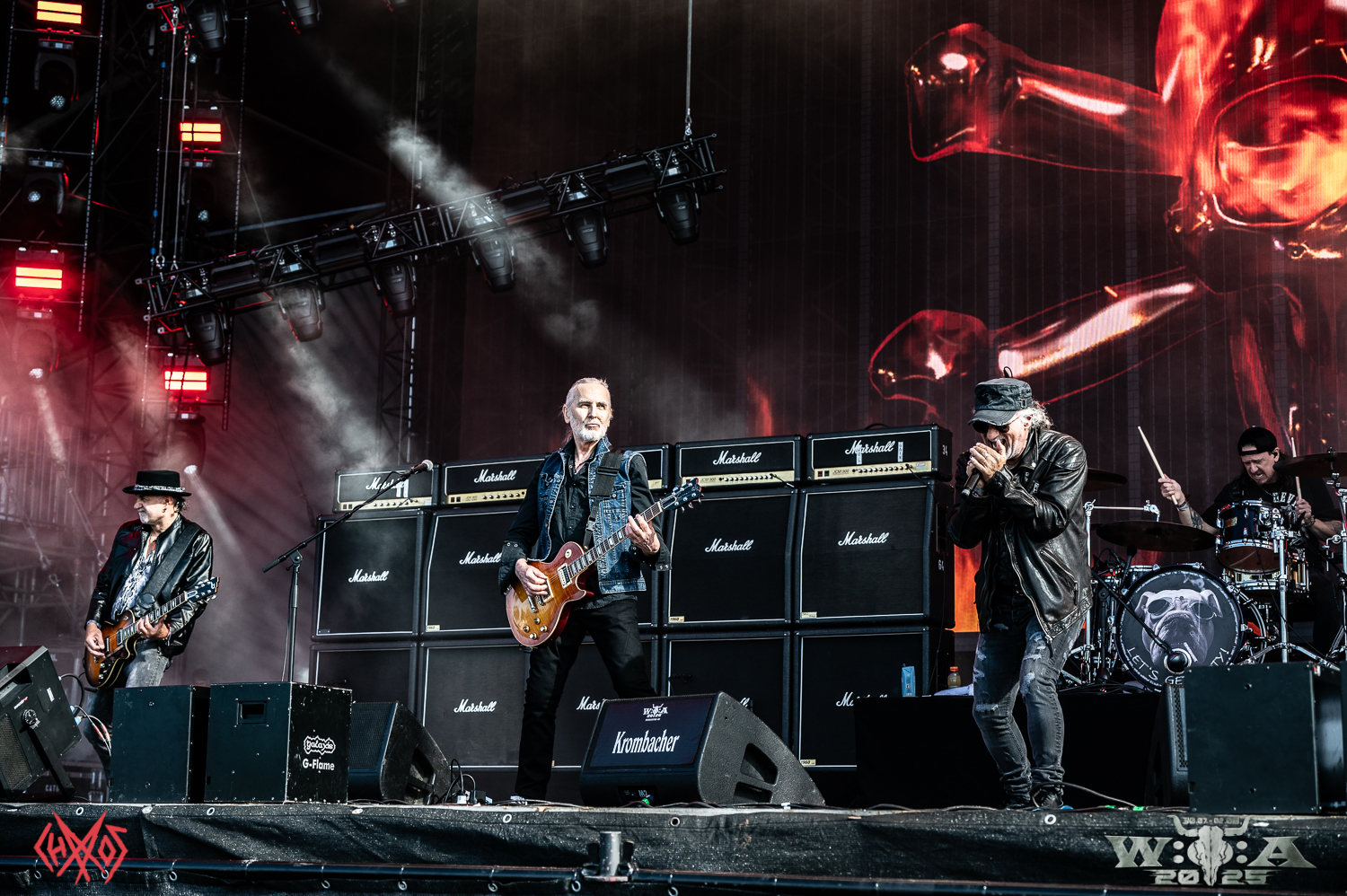
- Krokus at Wacken Open Air 2025

Background information
- Origin: Solothurn, Switzerland
- Genres: Hard rock; heavy metal
- Years active: 1975–present
- Labels: AFM; Arista; MCA
- Members: Chris von Rohr; Fernando von Arb; Marc Storace; Mandy Meyer; Mark Kohler; Flavio Mezzodi
- Past members: Peter Richard; Remo Spadino; Tommy Kiefer; Hansi Droz; Jurg Naegeli; Freddy Steady; Henry Friez; Mark Kohler; Steve Pace; Andy Tanas; Doug Johnson; Jeff Klaven; Paul Fox; Tommy Keiser; Jai Winding; Dani Crivelli; Björn Lodin; Peter McTanner; Peter Haas; Tony Castell; Many Maurer; Cliff Rodgers; Carl Sentance; Chris Lauper; Dave Stettler; Patrick Aeby; Stefan Schwarzmann; Dennis Ward; Kosta Zafiriou; Dominique Favez
- Website: krokusonline.com

Krokus is a Swiss hard rock band formed in 1975. They were popular in North America during the 1980s. The band was founded in Solothurn in 1975 by Chris von Rohr (vocals and multi-instruments) and Tommy Kiefer (guitar), both former members of Kaktus. Former TEA vocalist Marc Storace joined the band as frontman in time for their Metal Rendez-vous album in 1980.

== History ==
=== Formation (1975–1981) ===
Krokus was formed in 1975 as a progressive rock act. The group's original lead singer, Peter Richard, left before the first album was recorded, leaving lead guitarist Tommy Kiefer to handle lead vocal duties for the band's self-titled debut album. Chris von Rohr, originally the drummer, switched to lead vocals for the follow-up record, To You All, remaining in this capacity into the late 1970s (along with playing keyboards and percussion).

The new line-up was completed by guitarist Fernando von Arb, bassist Jürg Naegeli, and drummer Freddy Steady, who had released the "Rock Is Here" single as a trio under the name 'Montezuma' in 1976. With this line-up, Krokus became successful in Switzerland, touring throughout the country and releasing a third album, Painkiller, in 1978.

After seeing AC/DC in concert in the late 1970s, they changed their musical direction and adopted a new AC/DC-influenced sound. Von Rohr's vocal abilities were limited and the band hired a new lead vocalist, Marc Storace, formerly of TEA and Eazy Money, in 1979, and recorded and released the album Metal Rendez-vous in 1980. This was their first hit and brought the band international recognition.

The 1981 follow-up album, Hardware, was recorded at Roundhouse Studios in London and featured such songs as "Easy Rocker" and "Rock City", which became an enduring part of the band's live repertoire. Lead guitarist Tommy Kiefer was forced to leave the band because of heroin addiction early in the tour to support Hardware and was replaced by newcomer Mandy Meyer (ex-BM Smith). (Kiefer committed suicide on 24 December 1986, aged 34, after failing to conquer his heroin addiction.)

Meyer soon left, replaced by Mark Kohler, and teamed up with bassist Tommy Keiser (not to be confused with Tommy Kiefer) of fellow Swiss rockers Roxane to start his own band. Setting up headquarters in Memphis, Tennessee under the guidance of Krokus manager Butch Stone, the duo would recruit former Target vocalist Jimi Jamison, ex-Black Oak Arkansas guitarist/keyboardist Jack Holder, and drummer Jeff Klaven and issued their sole album, First Strike, under the name Cobra in 1983. Klaven and Keiser would both subsequently join Krokus. Meyer went on to join Asia and formed the short-lived Katmandu, although he would return to the Krokus line-up himself some years later. Jamison went on to perform backing vocals on Krokus recordings, in addition to replacing Dave Bickler in the band Survivor and achieving massive success with that group.

=== Rise to popularity and success years (1982–1988) ===
In 1982, with new American management, Krokus recorded One Vice at a Time, which features the hits, "Long Stick Goes Boom," and the Guess Who cover, "American Woman". By the time this album was recorded, the band had parted ways with Naegeli, at which point multi-instrumentalist von Rohr assumed the additional role of primary bassist. This album was also the first to feature Mark Kohler on guitar. Chris von Rohr described the album at the time as "the album AC/DC never made", as the influence of the Australian band is difficult to ignore. The comparisons actually cast doubt on the creativity of the band, as many listeners now, in spite of the Swiss band's much wider musical spectrum, began to regard Krokus merely as AC/DC imitators. Nevertheless, Krokus became increasingly popular in Europe and began to receive attention and success in the United States.

1983's Headhunter was the band's first album to be certified gold in the United States and hit number 25 in the 1983 Billboard 200 album chart. The album was Krokus' most successful album to date, both commercially and critically. It boasted the hit power ballad "Screaming in the Night", which saw heavy rotation on MTV and would become one of the band's most recognizable songs. Judas Priest's Rob Halford contributed backing vocals on the song "Ready to Burn". Bassist/keyboardist/percussionist Chris von Rohr was fired in late 1983 due to his writing an article published in a main Swiss newspaper exposing the band's rock 'n' roll habits, prior to the band's appearance at the RockPop Festival in Dortmund, Germany, with rhythm guitarist Mark Kohler switching over to bass and Patrick Mason, aka Patrick Mahassen, who had also played in the Swiss band Crown, taking over rhythm guitar duties for the remainder of the Headhunter tour; however, Mahassen exited the band prior to the recording of the next album, The Blitz, another Gold certified album, which the band completed as a four-piece. The tour for this album featured Mark Kohler returning to his main instrument, with Andy Tanas, formerly of Black Oak Arkansas, joining on the bass. These shows also featured Loverboy's Doug Johnson on keyboards. Meanwhile, von Rohr would go on to produce the band Headhunter's eponymous 1985 album, featuring future Krokus members Peter Tanner and Many Maurer, and release a solo album in 1987, entitled Hammer & Tongue (re-issued in 1993 as The Good, The Bad and The Dog after the release of von Rohr's autobiography, "Hunde wollt ihr ewig rocken"), which featured contributions from his former Krokus bandmates, Marc Storace and Fernando von Arb.

Pushed into a corner by their own management and record company, 1984 saw the band move in a glam rock direction with The Blitz, which featured a cover of Sweet's 1973 hit "The Ballroom Blitz". Though a commercial success, the album was panned critically. The band hit the Billboard Hot 100 with "Midnite Maniac" from that album, becoming the first Swiss act to do so. Capitalizing on the wave of success enjoyed by heavy metal in the mid-1980s, the band then released Change of Address in 1986, which featured a cover of the Alice Cooper standard "School's Out". The album production was way too clean and polished for Krokus and it became a commercial failure. As a counterbalance, Krokus soon released a live album entitled Alive and Screamin' while the band transitioned from Arista Records to MCA for the release of their Heart Attack album in 1988. Heart Attack was a last desperate attempt to keep the band together. It saw the return of bassist/keyboardist/percussionist Chris von Rohr with Dani Crivelli (who had played on von Rohr's solo album the previous year) on drums and was similarly written and produced in the band's early 80's style. However, the Swiss flagship of international heavy rock needed time out. Fernando and Marc had endured 8 years of constant writing, recording and touring with hardly any time off. Coming dangerously close to a burn-out they went on hiatus at the end of 1988. Von Rohr, Kohler and Crivelli tried to continue with Swedish vocalist Björn Lodin (from the bands Baltimoore and Six Feet Under) and lead guitarist Many Maurer, Crivelli's former bandmate from Killer. That line-up was short-lived and never recorded any material.

=== Later years (1989–2006) ===
Guitarist Fernando von Arb would remain the sole constant member throughout most of the 1990s as Krokus carried on with ever-changing line-ups. 1990's Stampede featured von Arb, former Headhunter members Peter Tanner (ex-Bloody Six, Witchcraft) and Many Maurer (ex-Killer), drummer Peter Haas (ex-Calhoun Conquer), and bassist Tony Castell. 1995 saw a brief reunion of the classic One Vice at a Time line-up, minus von Rohr, on the To Rock or Not to Be album. Welsh vocalist Carl Sentance (ex-Persian Risk, Geezer Butler Band) joined the band for Round 13, with Haas returning on drums. In 2003, the band released Rock the Block with the new line-up of Marc Storace on vocals, Fernando von Arb on lead guitar, bass and keyboards, Dominique Favez on rhythm and lead guitar, Tony Castell on bass and rhythm guitar, and Patrick Aeby on drums and percussion. In 2004 the same line-up released the live CD Fire and Gasoline.

In 2005, longtime guitarist/bassist/keyboardist Fernando von Arb left the band because of continuing wrist problems which required surgery. Mandy Meyer, who had played with the band in the early 1980s, replaced von Arb in the then current line-up. The new formation (Storace, Meyer, Favez, Castell, Stefan Schwarzmann and Dennis Ward) recorded the studio album Hellraiser in 2006, which went to gold in Switzerland on the first day of sales. It generally received very good reviews. In an interview in 2008, Marc Storace stated that Krokus was becoming more and more "metal". Prior to the album's release date, the band released the ballad "Angel of My Dreams" as a downloadable MP3.

=== Reunion with "classic lineup" (2007–2011) ===
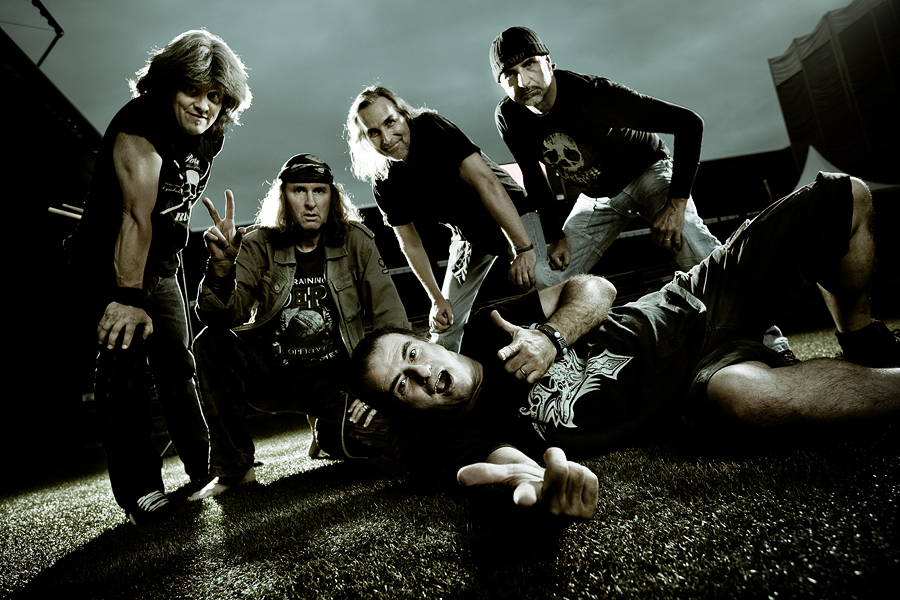
Krokus in 2008

On 18 November 2007, the lineup featuring Chris von Rohr, Fernando von Arb, Freddy Steady and Marc Storace reunited to play a medley ("Tokyo Nights", "Bedside Radio" and "Heatstrokes") during the TV show, Die grössten Schweizer Hits, on Swiss television. This led to their reunion concert on 2 August 2008 (with the addition of Mark Kohler). Krokus's cover of Sweet's "The Ballroom Blitz" also appeared in the 2007 game Guitar Hero Encore: Rocks the 80s.

It was announced on 20 April 2008, that the classic lineup of Chris von Rohr, Fernando von Arb, Freddy Steady, Mark Kohler and Marc Storace had reunited, and would be releasing a new studio record in 2010 with a supporting world tour. On 2 August 2008, the band performed live in the Stade de Suisse in Bern. Krokus performed the official anthem of the 2009 Ice Hockey World Championships, hosted by Switzerland. The song was entitled "Live for the Action".

On 3 March 2010, the album Hoodoo including a cover version of Steppenwolf's "Born to Be Wild" and ten other songs, was released. It came in a regular and limited edition, the latter containing a DVD featuring concert footage.

In May 2011, drummer/percussionist Fready Steady announced he was leaving the band.

=== Reunion with Mandy Meyer and retirement (2012–2017) ===
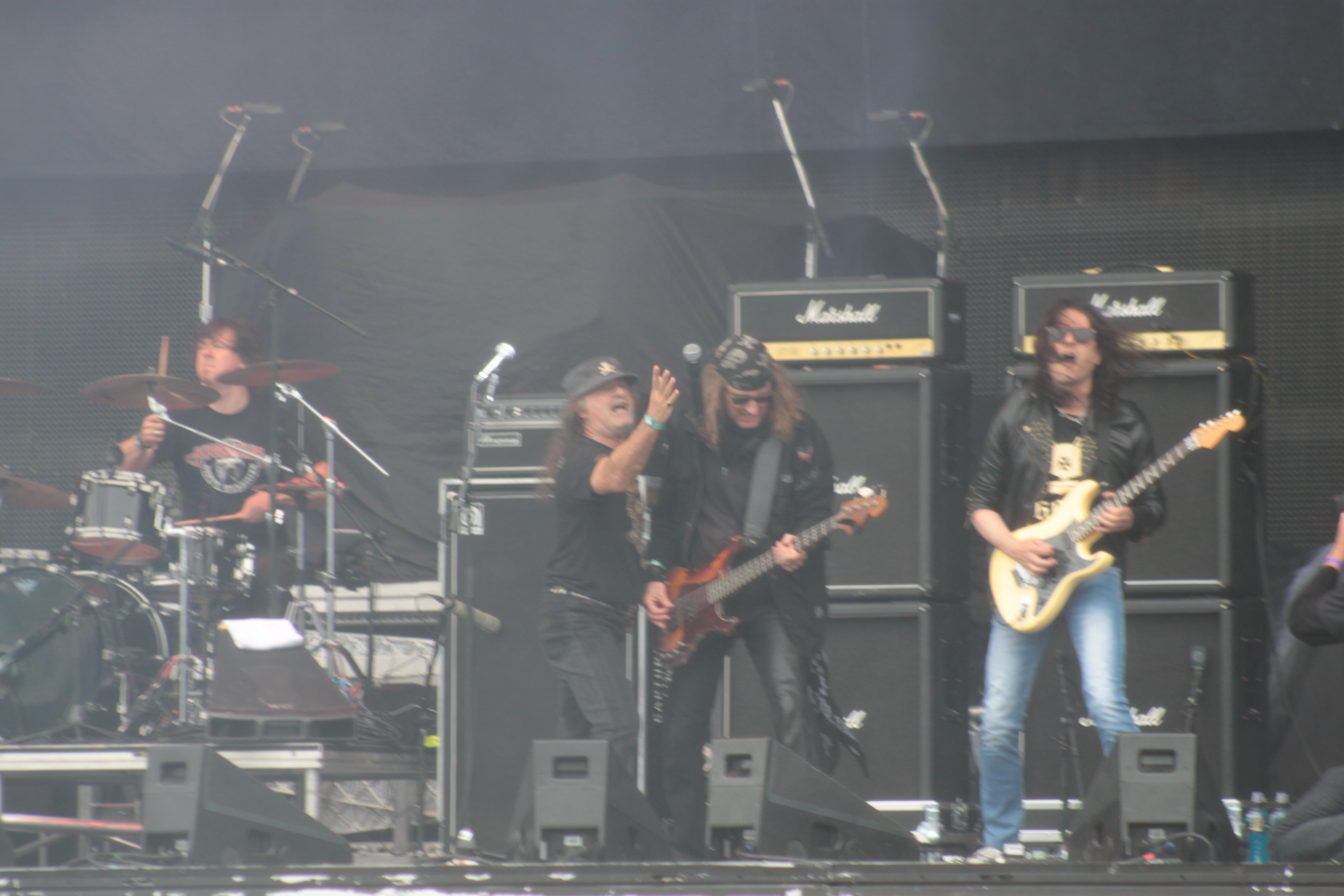
Krokus performing at Hellfest 2013

In December 2012, it was announced guitarist Mandy Meyer was once again rejoining the band after having filled in for an ailing Fernando von Arb at the Loud Park Festival in Japan in October 2011. Krokus released their seventeenth studio album Dirty Dynamite on 22 February 2013.

On 21 April 2013, it was reported that former drummer/percussionist Dani Crivelli, who played on the band's 1988 Heart Attack, had died. According to the German language Swiss daily Blick, Crivelli fell off a bridge to his death in Trimbach, Canton of Solothurn.

Swiss drummer/percussionist Flavio Mezzodi joined Krokus in May 2013 and played on their "Dirty Dynamite Tour". The band sold out an unprecedented four shows at the Kofmehl (House of Rust) in their hometown of Solothurn. The concerts were recorded for an upcoming live album and the fourth concert was released as Long Stick Goes Boom: Live from da House of Rust in 2014.

In April/May 2015, the band returned for some dates in the United States, where they had not performed since 2005. Fernando von Arb was not part of that tour, as he cannot travel for long distances and Krokus performed as a 5-piece band. This was another reason why Mandy Meyer was brought back into the fold in 2013 as second lead guitarist. Mark Kohler also needs to take longer leaves of absence from the band and in his place Dominique Favez will play once more rhythm guitar. Dominique recorded on the 2003 Rock the Block album, 2004's Fire and Gasoline and 2006's Hellraiser and is no stranger to Krokus fans.

The band's 18th studio release, a covers album entitled Big Rocks, was issued in January 2017.

=== Retirement from touring and return (2018–present) ===
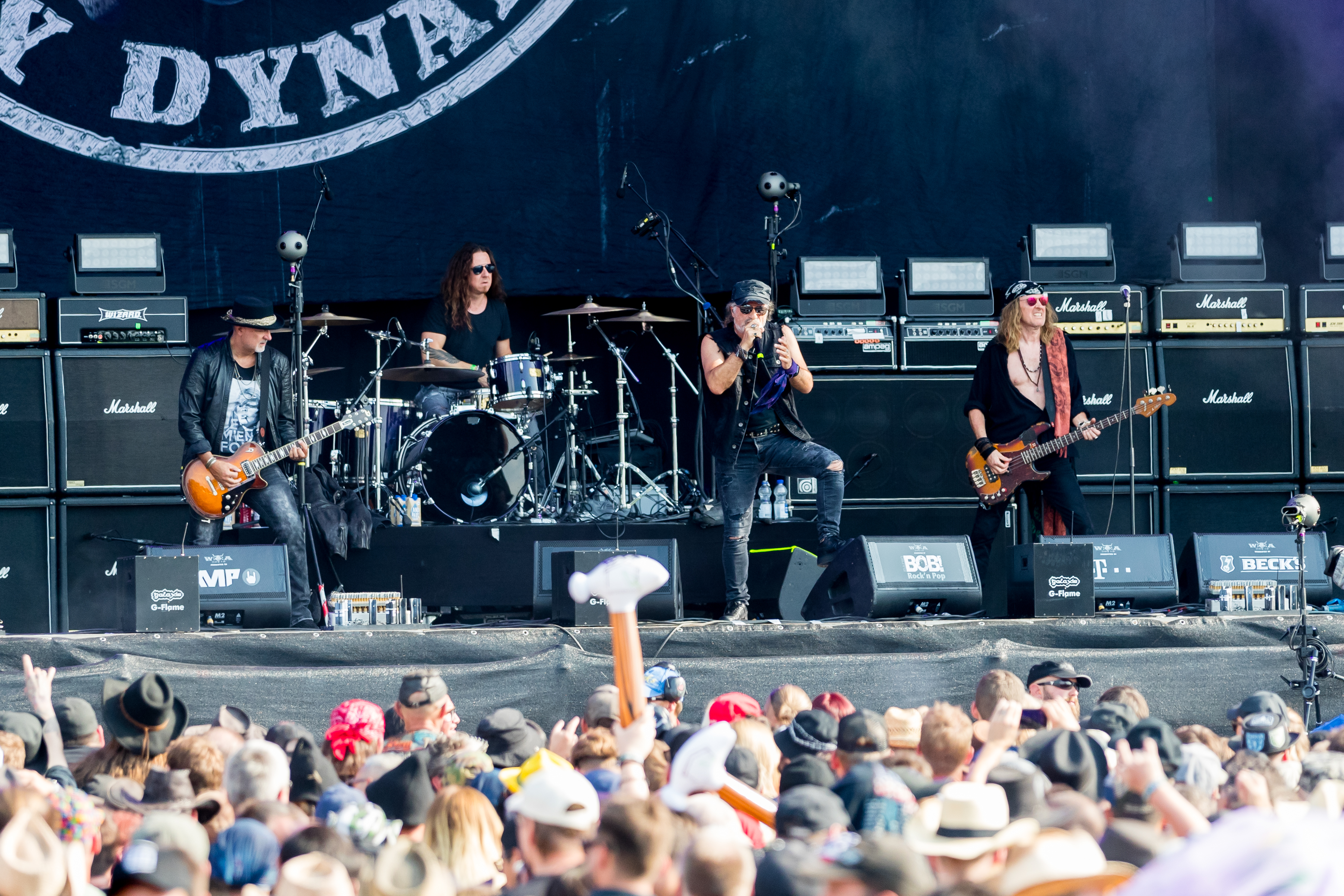
Krokus at Wacken Open Air 2019

In September 2018, Krokus announced their retirement and would embark on their farewell tour in 2019.

In June 2019, the band announced a final tour to take place in North America starting in 2020, but the dates were postponed due to the COVID-19 pandemic. In April 2020, the band announced, via their Instagram account, plans to restart their final tour in 2021:

"krokusband: thanx for your patience- we gonna continue the adios amigos tour in 2021 – long stick will go boom again! ☠️🎸☠️🔥".

Although the tour did not happen in 2021 either, in April 2022, vocalist Marc Storace still expressed interest in finishing the tour sometime in the future. The band resumed touring in 2024 in anticipation of their 50th anniversary in 2025.

When asked in September 2024 if Krokus was calling it quits, six years after announcing their final tour, Sorace said: "No, no, no, no. Krokus is reborn. We all feel fresh again. We've had a really nice run and the feeling in the band is really harmonious. And I don't sense any bad vibes for doing my solo stuff, because they know I did it because I was in a lockdown situation and that's how it started and the ball kept on rolling."

== Origin of band name ==
The band name Krokus is German for crocus, a flower common throughout Europe. In 1975, band founder Chris von Rohr observed a field of these flowers while traveling by train. He was returning from L'Ecole des Chefs located in France after an aborted career in the culinary arts, and it was around this time the idea for the band was formed. The band members stated that it was the perfect name, since it featured "rok" in the middle. The Krokus logo was designed by Swiss artist Beat Keller.

== Band members ==
Current members

- Chris von Rohr – bass, keyboards, percussion, drums, vocals (1975–1983, 1987–1989, 2008–present)
- Fernando von Arb – lead and rhythm guitars, keyboards, bass, vocals (1976–1988, 1990–1991, 1994–1995, 1999–2005, 2008–present)
- Marc "The Voice" Storace – lead vocals (1979–1988, 1994–1995, 2002–present)
- Armand "Mandy" Meyer – lead and rhythm guitars (1981, 2005–2008, 2012–present)
- Mark "Koki" Kohler – rhythm and lead guitars, bass (1982–1989, 1994–1995, 2008–present)
- Flavio Mezzodi – drums, percussion (2013–present)

== Discography ==
=== Studio albums ===
List of studio albums, with selected chart positions and certifications
Title	Album details	Peak chart positions					Certifications
Title	Album details	SWI	US	CAN	GER	UK	Certifications
Krokus	Released: 29 April 1976; Label: Schnoutz; Formats: CD, LP	—	—	—	—	—	
To You All	Released: 29 April 1977; Label: Schnoutz; Formats: CD, LP	—	—	—	—	—	
Pain Killer / Pay It In Metal	Released: 30 October 1978; Label: Mercury; Formats: CD, LP, CS	—	—	—	—	—	
Metal Rendez-vous	Released: 30 June 1980; Label: Ariola; Formats: CD, LP, CS, 8-track, DL	—	—	—	—	—	SWI: 4× Platinum
Hardware	Released: 18 February 1981; Label: Ariola; Formats: CD, LP, CS, 8-track, DL	—	103	—	56	44	SWI: Gold
One Vice at a Time	Released: 1 March 1982; Label: Arista; Formats: CD, LP, CS, 8-track, DL	—	53	—	38	28	
Headhunter	Released: 25 April 1983; Label: Arista; Formats: CD, LP, CS, 8-track, DL	44	25	31	—	74	RIAA: Gold; MC: Gold
The Blitz	Released: 22 August 1984; Label: Arista; Formats: CD, LP, CS, 8-track, DL	6	31	83	55	—	RIAA:Gold; MC:Gold
Change of Address	Released: 16 June 1986; Label: Arista; Formats: CD, LP, 8-track, CS	6	45	77	—	—	
Heart Attack	Released: 25 March 1988; Label: MCA; Formats: CD, LP, CS	5	87	—	—	—	
Stampede	Released: 14 November 1990; Label: Phonag; Formats: CD, LP, CS	18	—	—	—	—	
To Rock or Not to Be	Released: 29 April 1995; Label: Phonag; Formats: CD, CS	5	—	—	—	—	
Round 13	Released: 8 October 1999; Label: Phonag, Angel Air; Formats: CD	35	—	—	—	—	
Rock the Block	Released: 18 January 2003; Label: WMG; Formats: CD, DL	1	—	—	69	—	SWI: Gold
Hellraiser	Released: 15 September 2006; Label: AFM; Formats: CD, LP, DL	2	200	—	—	—	SWI: Gold
Hoodoo	Released: 26 February 2010; Label: Columbia, Sony; Formats: CD, DL	1	—	—	33	—	SWI: Platinum
Dirty Dynamite	Released: 5 March 2013; Label: The End; Formats: CD, LP, DL	1	—	—	17	—	SWI: Platinum
Big Rocks	Released: 27 January 2017; Label: Century Media; Formats: CD, LP, DL	1	—	—	31	—	SWI: Gold
"—" denotes a recording that did not chart or was not released in that territory. Switzerland did not have an albums chart until late 1983.

=== Compilation albums ===
- Early Days '75–'78 (1980)
- Stayed Awake All Night – The Best (1989)
- The Dirty Dozen (1993)
- Definitive Collection (2000)
- The Collection (2000)
- Best Of (2000)
- Headhunter Blitz (2002)
- Long Stick Goes Boom: The Anthology (2003)

=== Live albums ===
- Alive and Screamin' (1986)
- "Fire and Gasoline: Live!" (2004)
- Long Stick Goes Boom: Live from da House of Rust (2014)
- Adios Amigos: Live @ Wacken (2021)

=== Singles ===
Year	Single	Peak chart positions			Album
Year	Single	SWI	US	US Main. Rock	Album
1977	"Highway Song"	—	—	—	To You All
1978	"Susie"	—	—	—	Pain Killer
1980	"Bedside Radio"	58	—	—	Metal Rendez-vous
1980	"Heatstrokes"	—	—	—	Metal Rendez-vous
1980	"Tokyo Nights"	—	—	—	Metal Rendez-vous
1981	"Rock City"	—	—	—	Hardware
1981	"Burning Bones" [airplay]	—	—	46	Hardware
1981	"Winning Man"	—	—	26	Hardware
1981	"Smelly Nelly"	—	—	—	Hardware
1982	"Bad Boys Rag Dolls"	—	—	—	One Vice at a Time
1982	"Long Stick Goes Boom"	—	—	22	One Vice at a Time
1982	"American Woman"	—	—	53	One Vice at a Time
1983	"Screaming in the Night"	—	—	21	Headhunter
1983	"Eat the Rich"	—	—	33	Headhunter
1983	"Stayed Awake All Night"	—	—	31	Headhunter
1984	"Ballroom Blitz"	—	—	—	The Blitz
1984	"Midnite Maniac"	—	71	10	The Blitz
1984	"Our Love" [airplay]	—	—	22	The Blitz
1986	"School's Out"	—	67	—	Change of Address
1986	"Say Goodbye"	—	—	—	Change of Address
1987	"Let This Love Begin"	—	—	—	Change of Address
1988	"Wild Love"	—	—	—	Heart Attack
1994	"You Ain't Seen Nothin' Yet"	—	—	—	Non-album single
2003	"Open Fire"	—	—	—	Rock the Block
2006	"Angel of My Dreams"	—	—	—	Hellraiser
2010	"Hoodoo Woman"	19	—	—	Hoodoo
2013	"Dirty Dynamite"	32	—	—	Dirty Dynamite
"—" denotes a recording that did not chart or was not released in that territory.

=== Videos and DVDs ===
- The Video Blitz (1985, VHS & LaserDisc)
- Screaming in the Night (1986, VHS)
- Fire and Gasoline (2004, bonus DVD)
- As Long as We Live (2004, DVD)
- Live at Rocksound Festival, Huttwil 2006 (2006, DVD)
- Hoodoo (2010, DVD)
- Krokus Live at Baloise Session (2014, Blu-ray disc)
- Brooklyn Zoo Club 1982 (2015, DVD)
- Krokus – The Early Years 1977–1981 (2017, DVD)

== Music videos ==
List of music videos
Title	Year
"Move It On - Live"	1976
"Highway song"	1977
"Rock Me, Rock You, All Night Long"	1978
"Heatstrokes"	1980
"Tokyo Nights"	1980
"Back Seat Rock'n'Roll"	1980
"Lady Double Dealer"	1980
"Streamer"	1981
"She's Got Everything"	1981
"Easy Rocker"	1981
"American Woman"	1982
"Screaming In The Night"	1983
"Eat The Rich"	1983
"Ballroom Blitz"	1984
"Midnite Maniac"	1984
"Our Love"	1984
"Burning Up The Night"	1986
"School's Out"	1986
"Rock 'N' Roll Tonight"	1988
"Let It Go"	1988
"Hoodoo Woman"	2010
"Too Hot"	2010
"Dirty Dynamite"	2013
"Dög Song"	2013
"Rockin' In The Free World"	2017
