= Little Willie Littlefield =

American pianist and singer (1931–2013)

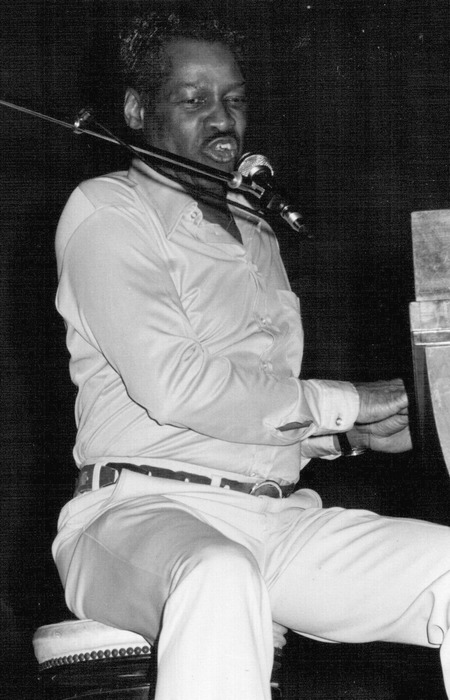
- Littlefield performing at Saint-Ouen-l'Aumône, France, in 1980

Background information
- Born: Willie Littlefield, Jr. September 16, 1931; El Campo, Texas, U.S.
- Died: June 23, 2013 (aged 81); Voorthuizen, Netherlands
- Genres: R&B; jump blues; urban blues; boogie-woogie
- Occupations: Musician; songwriter; producer
- Instruments: Singing; piano
- Years active: 1949–2013
- Labels: Eddie's; Modern; Federal; Rhythm; Ace; Oldie Blues

"Willie's Boogie Medley" sample
Audio sample of "Willie's Boogie Medley", recorded August 1949, Houston, Texas

Willie Littlefield, Jr., billed as Little Willie Littlefield (September 16, 1931 – June 23, 2013), was an American R&B and boogie-woogie pianist and singer whose early recordings "formed a vital link between boogie-woogie and rock and roll". Littlefield was regarded as a teenage wonder and overnight sensation when in 1949, at the age of 18, he popularized the triplet piano style on his Modern Records debut single, "It's Midnight". He also recorded the first version of the song "Kansas City" (originally issued as "K. C. Lovin'"), in 1952.

== Career ==
=== Early career ===
Littlefield was born in El Campo, Texas, and grew up in Houston with his mother. By 1947, at the age of sixteen, he was already a local attraction in many of the clubs on Dowling Street in Houston and was recording for Eddie Henry, a local record shop proprietor who ran his own label, Eddie's Records. He formed his first band with the saxophonist Don Wilkerson, a friend from school.

Other major influences on Littlefield's style were the Texas musicians Charles Brown and Amos Milburn.

His first recording, "Little Willie's Boogie", was a hit in Texas in 1949 and brought him to the attention of Jules Bihari, of Modern Records in Los Angeles, who was searching for a performer to rival the success of Amos Milburn.

=== Success at Modern records ===
Littlefield returned to Modern Records and recorded "It's Midnight". It reached number three on the Billboard R&B chart, and its follow-up, "Farewell", reached number five. He became a major nightclub attraction and recorded with West Coast musicians such as Maxwell Davis. Don Wilkerson, Littlefield's schoolmate and the leading saxophone player in his band, also travelled to Los Angeles, but Milburn promptly persuaded him to lead Milburn's new band, the Aladdin Chickenshackers.

One of his 1950 recordings, "Happy Pay Day", written by Jack Holmes, was later rewritten by Holmes with entirely different lyrics as "The Blacksmith Blues", which became a hit for Ella Mae Morse.

In 1951, his duet with Little Lora Wiggins, "I've Been Lost", reached number 10 on the R&B chart.

In 1952 he moved to the Federal subsidiary of King Records. His first session for Federal produced "K. C. Loving", written by Jerry Leiber and Mike Stoller and later re-recorded by Wilbert Harrison as "Kansas City".

In the late 1970s he toured Europe successfully, settling in the Netherlands and releasing a number of albums from 1982 into the late 1990s for the Oldie Blues label from Martin van Olderen.

=== Retirement and comeback ===
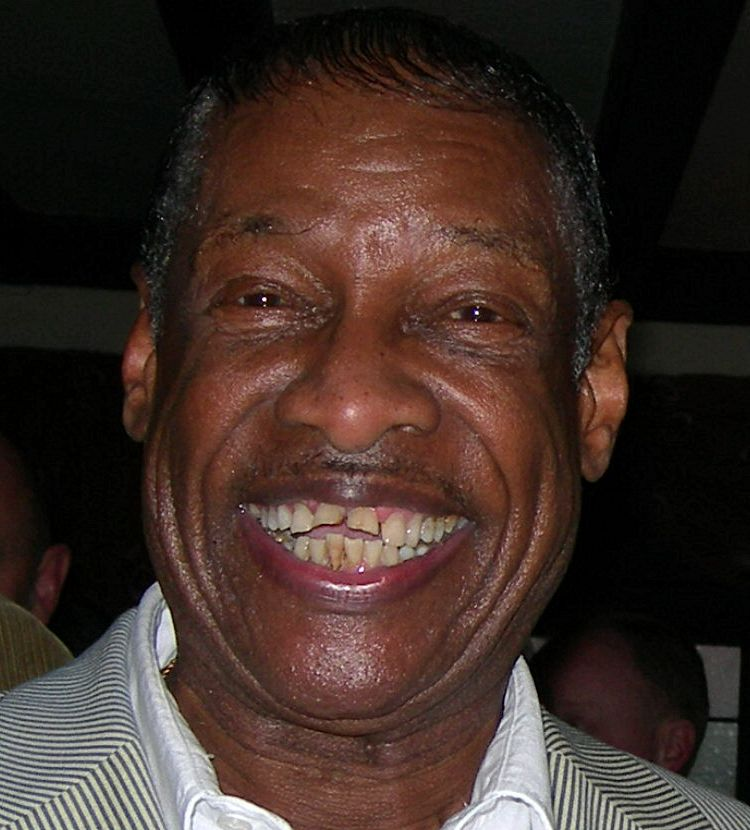
Littlefield in Germany, 2006

After touring for more than 50 years, Littlefield stopped in 2000. After five years of retirement in his adopted home country, the Netherlands, he decided to play again, starting in 2006, declaring, "I went fishing for five years – now I know every herring in Holland by name – it got boring. I feel great and I want to be back with my audience."

In his later years Littlefield continued to perform occasionally, mainly at festivals, particularly in the UK. In 2008 he played at the 20th Burnley Blues Festival, in 2008, and at the 5th annual UK Boogie Woogie Festival at Sturminster Newton in Dorset, in July 2009. He performed at Shakedown Blues Club, at Castor Village Hall, near Castor, Peterborough, in 2006 and made a return appearance in October 2010.

He died at his home in Voorthuizen, Netherlands, in 2013, at the age of 81. He had cancer.

== Selected discography ==
=== Albums ===
- 1980: Paris Streetlights, Paris Album PLB 2 28508 (recorded May 14, 1980); reissued on CD, 1996, EPM Blues Collection BC 157802
- 1982: Houseparty, Oldie Blues OL 8003 (recorded June 1982)
- 1983: I'm in the Mood, Oldie Blues OL 8006 (recorded 1983)
- 1985: Happy Pay Day, Ace CH 150
- 1987: Plays the Boogie Woogie, Schubert Records SCH-100 (recorded 1987); reissued on CD, 1992, Munich CMA CM 8013
- 1990: Singalong with Little Willie Littlefield, Oldie Blues OLCD 7001 (recorded 1987)
- 1992: ...Goes Rhythm 'n Blues, CMA Music CMA CM 10002
- 1993: The Stars of Rhythm 'n Blues! CMA Music CMA CM 10007
- 1994: Yellow Boogie & Blues, Oldie Blues OLCD 7006 (recorded 1994)
- 1997: The Red One, Oldie Blues OLCD 7005 (recorded June 1997)
- 2006: Little Willie Littlefield Live – Music Keeps You Young, Schubert Records SCH-205 (recorded live in Germany, April 20, 2006)
- 2008: Old Time Feeling, Stormy Monday 81242

=== Selected compilation albums ===
- 1977: K.C. Loving, K.C. 101 (LP/14 tracks)
- 1979: It's Midnight, Route 66 KIX-10 (LP/16 tracks)
- 1980: Volume 1, Ace 10CH 24 (10-inch LP/8 tracks)
- 1981: Volume 2, Ace 10CH 34 (10-inch LP/8 tracks)
- 1984: Jump with Little Willie Littlefield, Ace CHD 114 (LP/16 tracks)
- 1993: I'm in the Mood, Oldie Blues OLCD 7002 (recorded 1982, 1983)
- 1995: Going Back to Kay Cee, Ace CDCHD 503
- 1999: Kat on the Keys (The Legendary Modern Recordings), Ace CDCHD 736
- 2005: Boogie, Blues and Bounce: The Modern Recordings, Volume 2, Ace CDCHD 1056
- 2018: The Best of the Rest – Selected Recordings from Eddie's, Federal & Rhythm Years 1948–1958, Jasmine JASMCD 3090

== See also ==
- Chicago Blues Festival
- List of blues musicians
- List of boogie woogie musicians
- List of jump blues musicians
- List of West Coast blues musicians
- San Francisco Blues Festival
- West Coast blues
