= Les Sauterelles =

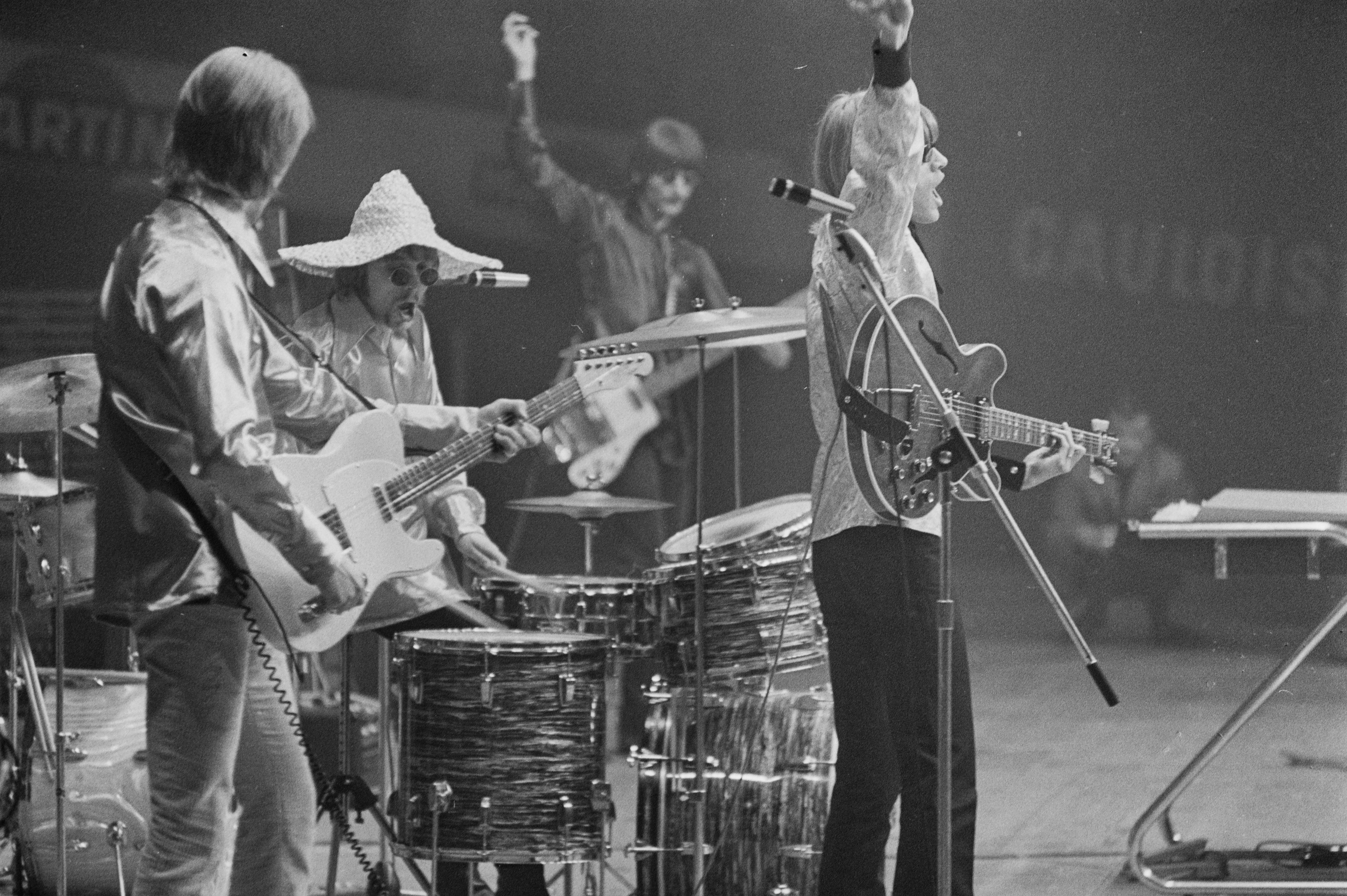
- Les Sauterelles, Opening act at the Rolling Stones concert 1967 in Zurich

Background information
- Origin: Zürich, Switzerland
- Genres: Pop, beat music, rock, Swiss music, tribute band
- Years active: 1962–1971; 1988–present

Les Sauterelles (French, literally: the grasshoppers) are a Swiss musical group established in 1962. At least in the German-language area, they are believed to be as one of the 'closest' tribute bands to The Beatles, and to The Shadows.

== History ==
=== Founding and name ===
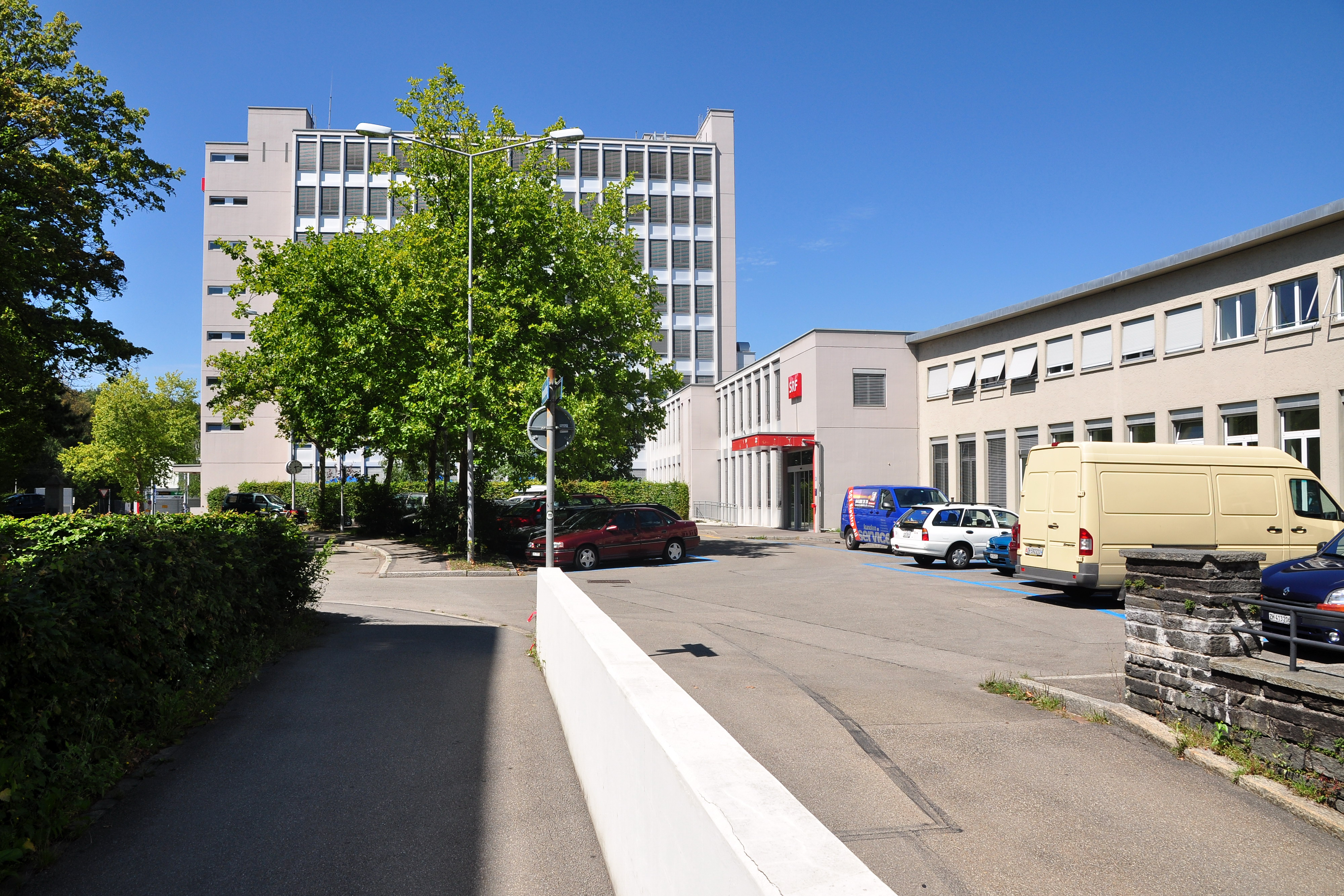
Schweizer Radio DRS, Brunnenhof studio in Zürich

On 19 September 1962, in the lobby of the studio Brunnenhof of the Swiss national radio in Zürich, two unnamed students from French-speaking Switzerland, who are dedicated to the music of The Shadows, and also Toni Vescoli, an aspiring singer-guitarist participated at the trials for a guitar festival in Lausanne as "mini-Shadows": they had hardly a chance to win, but at least their first professional studio recording, and never met again. François Garzoni, drummer, and Toni Vescoli rehearsed first songs at Garzoni's home, and LES SAUTERELLES were born, the "grass-hoppers" or more precisely "Locusts". Peter Frey, in fact a jazz musician and former classmate of Vescoli, acted as third member as "instrumental guitarist in the style of The Shadows" as the most experienced and oldest guy. Bass guitarist Günter Sohr, which, however, does not play bass guitar, the latter played by Peter Furrer, but the sound at the youth center Zürich-Bachwiesen convinced. Otto Ritschard, the friend of Toni Vescolis sister Vera, shortly thereafter joins the Sauterelles as bass guitarist, although he has never played a guitar; Toni Quero, former music teacher, taught him.

=== The Les-Sauterelles sound of the 1960s ===
Toni Vescoli planned with the band to earn his income, what for François is too risky, and Toni Quero brings Otto Bumbacher in the band, with the "two Ottos" and "two Tonis", it's now complete again. Toni Vescoli's sister Vera joined as a singer, as well as her agent to mediate gigs. On 26 December 1963, the Sauterelles have their first professional engagement, a week in Laax, which must however be terminated due to lack of snow and therefore guests on 1 January 1964. On 1 June 1965 Les Sauterelles had three consecutive months of various gigs in the club "Bagatelle" in Zürich as "Beat Band". In August, Peter Steffen played drums, and the recording session for the single "Hong Kong / Forget it all" began. In the interlude of Cliff Richard & The Shadows at the Hallenstadion, Jürg has medically holidays again, as a drummer acted Mandi Trappletti, and it goes on tour with the British band "Casey Jones and The Governors". The manager, Hans-Ruedi Jäggi was replaced on the best terms by Freddy Burger, and on 15 September 1965, the first record of Sauterelles was published, and sold out in half an hour – the song "Hong Kong" is the first Beat-single at the top of the Swiss Hitparade. Along with "The Counts" from Zürich and "The Dynamites" from Basel the album "SWISS BEAT – live" is recorded and mixed, again by Hans Wettler. Jürg Stocker, meanwhile his lung shadows is healed, and sound engineer Paul Delisle realize the single "I'm A Prisoner / Pretty Baby Tonight" in November 1965. In the sample number of the POP magazine, Toni Vescoli is on the front cover, and an article on the "Counts" about Düde Dürst, which then became the new drummer. The Sauterelles played thereafter for the "pot collection" of the Salvation Army, and the band got international attention by the photographs published.

Willy was replaced by Peter Rietmann, Toni started to compose on the harmonium after an accident, and together with Rolf Antener new songs were created. The daily newspaper Blick covers the costs for a production at the studio Bauer in Ludwigsburg, Ernst Kunz writes string arrangements and conducted in the studio a 16-piece string orchestra; a Dixie-band and a children's choir are other guests in the studio. For live concerts, Fritz Trippel joined the Sauterelles as a keyboardist, and with "Little Fritz" more recordings were done in a multi-week tour through Switzerland, with the singer Arlette Zola from Fribourg. The single "Heavenly Club" appears on 9 July 1968, as the first Swiss production in the Media Control Charts, it dominated the official singles chart for 13 weeks, of which 6 at the 1st place, and in the handset hit parade of radio stations, as Radio Luxembourg and Südwest Radio Baden-Baden, Les Sauterelles are played again and again, and the single played in the most European countries, in the US and even in Japan. Meanwhile, the Sauterelles performed in the Swiss television's "Hits à Gogo" as permanent guests, and Gianni Paggi realizes a short film, which is regarded as the first video clip of the pop era. In August 1968, the album "View To Heaven", and the band is produced by Decca Germany. After more than 300 performances a year, drummer Düde Dürst and Rolf Antener are burnt out, and Les Sauterelles initially resolved.

=== The Off and a new start ===
Mid-December 1968 was the last appearance of that success lineup in Zürich, New Year's Eve started Toni already with a new lineup that was planned as "Vocal Group" together with the "Pony-Sisters" Fioretta and Bernadette Wälle, drummer Mike (Martin) Stoffner and bassist Werner Fröhlich: for CBS the single "Station On Third Avenue / All Alone" was recorded in Biel. Bassist Werner Fröhlich was replaced by Turo Paschayan, and it followed the single "Be Crazy And Dance, Part one / Part two". Rolf Antener and a confident keyboard player from Italy even joined in: "High-Notes Singer" Roberto Carlotto, known as "Unca-Munca" in Italy. Yes and Mike Oldfield's Super Session were new paragons, but the band also developed own arrangements. The few concerts given are very successful, but in the clubs now disc jockeys have taken the place of live bands; the new style of Sauterelles is still unknown in Switzerland, and to play the old style of the Swiss Beatles is no more asked by the band members. A final single on their own label can not save the Sauterelles: "And The Sun will Shine / I Threw It All Away" was all that remained. Still working on a concept album, but no appearances, and a published obituary concluded: "The Sauterelles are dead."

Toni Vescoli started his solo career, until he learned from Düde Dürst, that one last concert is organized by Peter Zumsteg, the founder of the concert agency "Good News", and Les Sauterelles (preferably in the formation of the end of 1965) have to participate. Toni, Düde, Bruno and Enzo as Les Sauterelles are again at the Volkshaus Zürich a great success, followed by four more concerts, but now Düde preferred his "Crocodiles", and Toni was promoting his first solo album "information". Teddy Meier, her then-discoverer, brings the band for a re-recording of "Hong Kong" to the studio, but "Hongkong73" is unsuccessful, except a few television appearances.

=== 1988 and another new beginning ===
Bruno Merz was 50 years old, and wants Les Sauterelles play at his birthday party, in the same formation as of 1971, but the project can not be pursued, a family member became heavenly diseased. Toni Vescoli celebrated "25 years of music!" in 1990, and planned a full-length concert, sponsored by radio 24, in Sauterelles' original line-up with Bruno Merz, Freddy Mangili, Jürg Stocker, Düde Dürst and Enzo Ernst in the Kaufleuten Zürich event restaurant. They were supplemented by Max Lässer, Tobi Tobler and his bassist Ficht Tanner and "VESCOLI & Co". The 4½-hour concert was recorded by the local station Hasli TV, and Beat Hirt produced for the Swiss television a 45-minute documentary-compilation with old film clips, from which the video "25 years Toni Vescoli" was created. The album "View To Heaven" was first released as a CD, and for Kurt Felix, Les Sauterelles played a medley in the then successful Saturday night program "Super Hits".

André Béchir, 1992 chief of "Good News", organized at the Hallenstadion Zürich an international "Oldies Night", where the Sauterelles with Düde, Freddy Mangili and Marc Portmann as a substitute for Bruno, performed successfully for a single re-union. In 1993 Polo Hofer organized an open-air concert in Interlaken, but Marc Portmann went with Andreas Vollenweider on a world tour, and Peter Glanzmann occurred as a guitarist for the band idiom. The Sauterelles now rehearsed again more or less regularly, although followed up to 1996 only a few gigs. Despite an announced Rock Night with Florian Ast, Amber and Les Sauterelles, the first concert had only just 100 visitors, but the next day, 15,000 spectators beyond the Castello Grande Bellinzona. In 1997 a "Sauterelles-Medley" including their hits was recorded, the band opened the exhibition "Walk on the Wild Side" (30 years of youth culture) in Lenzburg, and played at various festivals and their former favorite club, in the Café Atlantis in Basel. A year later, Les Sauterelles seem risen again as opening act for Bob Dylan and Joe Cocker in the "Out In The Green" open-air festival Frauenfeld, and more gigs and concert halls performances. The US singer Eric St. Michaels covered "Heavenly Club", and for the Swiss television Toni and Eric song in the Prix Walo as a duet, followed by other appearances. After the death of bassist Freddy Mangili, the band said goodbye to the stage.

== Line-up ==
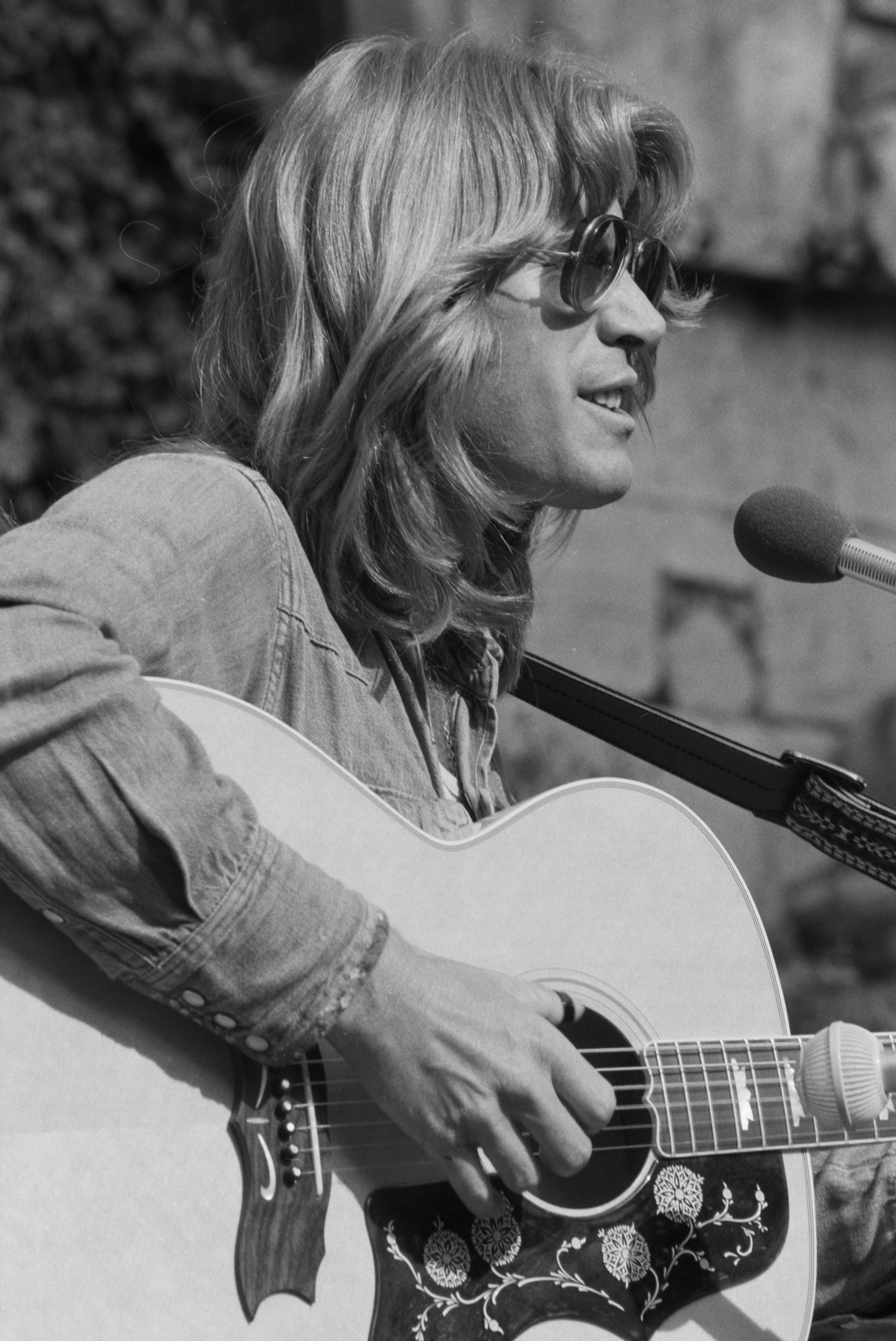
Toni Vescoli (1975)

=== Current members ===
- Toni Vescoli (vocals, guitar)
- Düde Dürst (drums)
- Freddy Mangili (bass)
- Peter Glanzman (guitar)
