= Rob Agerbeek =

Dutch musician (1937–2023)

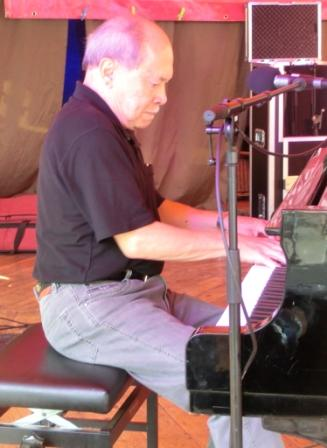
- Agerbeek in 2013

Background information
- Born: Robbert Arris Jules Agerbeek; 28 September 1937; Batavia, Dutch East Indies
- Died: 5 July 2023 (aged 85) The Hague, Netherlands
- Genres: Boogie-woogie, Dixieland jazz, swing, contemporary jazz
- Occupations: Musician, composer
- Instrument: Piano
- Years active: 1956–2023
- Labels: CBS, Polydor, Dexterity, Munich, Oldie Blues, Timeless, Lime Tree, Jazzz'91, Blue Jack Jazz, Venus

Robbert Arris Jules Agerbeek (28 September 1937 – 5 July 2023) was an Indo Dutch boogie-woogie and jazz pianist and winner of several jazz concourses in the Netherlands in the late 1950s. He was regarded as one of Europe's finest jazz pianists, covering the full spectrum of jazz styles from his early days of Boogie-Woogie to Chicago traditional Jazz, swing and contemporary jazz. Agerbeek gained recognition as a highly regarded accompanist for numerous renowned American jazz musicians who toured and resided in Europe during the 1960s and 1970s. Notable collaborations included performances with Gene Ammons, Art Blakey, Don Byas, Johnny Griffin, Dexter Gordon, Hank Mobley and Ben Webster. Agerbeek's ability to adapt to different musical styles impressed audiences and critics alike. In the 1980s, he surprised many by transitioning to traditional jazz and joining the Dutch Swing College Band.

== Early life and career ==
In 1954 Agerbeek and his family arrived in the Netherlands. He started playing the piano at the age of 17 or 18. Except for one piano lesson from his mother he was completely self-taught; he learned the piano by listening to records of Albert Ammons, Johnny Maddox, Winifred Atwell, Pete Johnson and Meade Lux Lewis. In the first years of his career Agerbeek was mainly into Boogie-woogie and later in his career he expanded his playing styles with bebop, hardbop and dixieland. He accompanied more than hundred, mainly American, Jazz musicians such as Ben Webster, Hank Mobley, Dexter Gordon, George Coleman, Johnny Griffin, George Coleman and Gene Ammons.

Agerbeek performed at international jazzfestivals as the Paris Jazz Festival, Hammerveld Jazz Festival, North Sea Jazz Festival, Kongsberg Jazz Festival and the Berlin Jazz Festival.

== Later career ==
On 17 November 1996 Agerbeek celebrated his 40 years jubilee as an allround jazz pianist when he was presented with the membership of honour of the Hague Jazz Club.

in the 1990s Agerbeek performed with The Grand Piano Boogie Train featuring Dutch pianists Rob Hoeke and Jaap Dekker and recorded two albums with the group.

As of 2022, Agerbeek still occasionally performed with his trio consisting of himself on piano and Ben Schröder on drums and Alex Milo on bass. Joining in on vocals on several performances were Jazz singer Mirjam van Dam, Susanne de Rooij and Brigitte Soffner.

Rob Agerbeek's last public performance was on 18 May 2023.

== Death ==
Agerbeek died on 5 July 2023, at the age of 85.

== Awards ==
- AVRO Jazzcompetitie, winner as Het Rob Agerbeek Kwartet (1956)
- Haags Jazzconcours, winner as Het Rob Agerbeek Kwartet (1958)
- Nationaal Jazzconcours, winner as Het Rob Agerbeek Kwartet (1958)
- Membership of honour, the Hague Jazz Club (1996)

== Discography ==
Rob Agerbeek's discography of over 40 albums including "Homerun," "Beatles' Boogies," "All Souls" (featuring Dexter Gordon), "Keep The Change," "Pardon My Bop" and "On Green Dolphin Street" (featuring George Coleman). Five albums with the Dutch Swing College Band and 10 recordings with his own bands of which three on the Oldie Blues label.

=== Studio albums as Rob Agerbeek, Rob Agerbeek Trio and Rob Agerbeek Quintet ===
- Boogie Woogie Party, as Rob Agerbeek Quintet, CBS, 1971
- Homerun, as Rob Agerbeek Quintet, Polydor, 1971
- Beatles' Boogies, as Rob Agerbeek, CBS, 1971
- All Souls, as The Rob Agerbeek Trio featuring Dexter Gordon, Dexterity, 1972
- Keep the Change, as The Rob Agerbeek Quintet, Munich, 1976
- The Boogie Rocks, as Rob Agerbeek, Oldie Blues, 1975
- Miss Dee, as Rob Agerbeek Trio, Lime Tree, 1981 (released on CD, 2023)
- Swing Gift, as Rob Agerbeek Trio, Jazzz '91, 1991
- Second Opinion, as Rob Agerbeek Trio, Jazzz '91, 1992
- Full House, as Rob Agerbeek Trio, Nuts Ziektekosten Verzekering, 1994 (re-release on CD 2023)
- The Boogie Rocks, as Rob Agerbeek, Oldie Blues, 1997 (expanded re-issue of 1975 album)
- Three of a Kind, as Rob Agerbeek, Oldie Blues, 1998
- Homerun – volume 2', as Rob Agerbeek Quintet, Blue Jack Jazz Records, 2006
- The Very Thought of You, as Rob Agerbeek Trio, Venus, 2007 (Japan)

=== Collaboration albums ===
- Gibraltar, as Harry Verbeke/Rob Agerbeek Quartet, Timeless, 1980
- Seven Steps, as Harry Verbeke/Rob Agerbeek Quartet, Timeless, 1983
- Stardust, as Harry Verbeke/Rob Agerbeek, Timeless, 1992
- Boogie on the Move as The Grand Piano Boogie Train: Jaap Dekker, Rob Hoeke and Rob Agerbeek, Rodero Records, 1996
- Blues & Boogie Movin' On as The Grand Piano Boogie Train: Jaap Dekker, Rob Hoeke and Rob Agerbeek, Rodero Records, 1997
- That's all, as Ann Burton & Mark Murphy meet the Rob Agerbeek Trio, Blue Jack Jazz Records, 2004
- Pardon My Bop, as Rob Agerbeek/Ruud Brink Quartet, Blue Jack Jazz Records, 2004
- Almost Blue, as John Marshall & The Rob Agerbeek Trio, Blue Jack Jazz Records, 2008
- On Green Dolphin Street, as George Coleman and The Rob Agerbeek Trio, Blue Jack Jazz Records, 2010

=== As member of The Dutch Swing College Band ===
- The Best Of Dixie, The Dutch Swing College Band (Rob Agerbeek piano), MasterTone, 1999
- We Double Dare You, The Dutch Swing College Band (Rob Agerbeek piano), Timeless Records, 2004

=== Albums featuring Rob Agerbeek ===
- Everything Happens, Ann Burton (Rob Agerbeek piano), Burtone, 1998
- Hank Mobley in Holland : To one so sweet stay that way, Hank Mobley (Rob Agerbeek piano), Nederlands Jazz Archief, 2016
- To One So Sweet Stay That Way: Hank Mobley in Holland, Hank Mobley (Rob Agerbeek piano), Nederlands Jazz Archief, 2017 (recorded in 1968)
