= Oldie Blues =

Former Dutch record label

- Founded: 1974
- Founder: Martin van Olderen
- Defunct: 2004
- Distributor(s): Munich Records
- Genre: Piano blues, boogie-woogie, Delta blues
- Country of origin: Netherlands

Oldie Blues was a Dutch record label founded and owned by Martin van Olderen.

== History ==
The label was founded in 1974 and focused primarily on piano blues, boogie-woogie and Delta blues, issuing 46 LPs and 13 CDs. After the death of Martin van Olderen in 2002 the label continued to issue records into 2004. Oldie Blues was marketed and distributed by Munich Records.

== Artists ==
The label's roster included Little Willie Littlefield, Blind John Davis, Lonnie Johnson, Roosevelt Sykes, Big Joe Williams and Dutch musicians Rob Hoeke, Martijn Schok, and Rob Agerbeek.
