= Cobra (American band) =

American glam metal band

Background information
- Origin: Memphis, Tennessee, U.S.
- Genres: Glam metal, Heavy metal
- Years active: 1982–1984
- Label: Epic Records
- Past members: Jimi Jamison; Mandy Meyer; Tommy Keiser; Jack Holder; Jeff Klaven; Tommy Andris

Cobra was an American glam metal band from Memphis, Tennessee, active in the early 1980s. Having formed in 1982, the band released an album the following year that led to tours supporting acts like Quiet Riot and Nazareth. They are perhaps best known for several musicians who later joined more prominent bands, including future Survivor singer Jimi Jamison and Krokus (and later Asia) guitarist Mandy Meyer. Cobra went their separate ways in 1984.

== History ==
After leaving Krokus on the heels of the Hardware tour in 1982, guitarist Mandy Meyer set up in Memphis, Tennessee to start his own band, joined by fellow Swiss compatriots, vocalist Tommy Andris and bassist Tommy Keiser, both formerly with Lucerne, Switzerland-based group Roxane. Andris did not last and was replaced by the former Target frontman Jimi Jamison. Eventually named Cobra, the band's lineup was rounded out by Memphis-based guitarist/keyboardist Jack Holder (ex-Black Oak Arkansas) and drummer Jeff Klaven. Managed by Butch Stone, who had also handled Jamison's old band Target as well as Krokus and Black Oak Arkansas, the band became a fixture on the local scene and managed to score a record deal with Epic Records. The group released their lone album, the Tom Allom-produced First Strike, in 1983. In the British music magazine Kerrang! the album took first place in the import chart.

"Blood On Your Money" got MTV airplay, "Looking at You", and "Travelin' Man" were promoted at the TV Club. The band toured in the United States, opening for Quiet Riot, Nazareth, and Krokus; the band's show in Memphis on November 27, 1983, was broadcast on the King Biscuit Flower Hour (KBFH) and later partly released on the Live Attack! and Only You Can Rock Me bootlegs. The live set included a half dozen unreleased songs, including their original "I'm a Fighter", which was covered by the group Van Zant in the mid-1980s, a cover of "On and On" from MSG's sophomore album and Head Games from Foreigner. Meanwhile, First Strike was only a moderate commercial success, Cobra disbanded in 1984, primarily due to each member wanting to do different things.

=== Post-breakup ===
Following the band's breakup, Jamison auditioned for the AOR band Survivor and got the gig, replacing original lead singer Dave Bickler, who had to step down due to throat issues. With Jamison fronting the band, Survivor went on to score multiple top-ten U.S. and international hits throughout the 1980s. Meyer returned to Europe and joined UK group Asia, performing on their Astra album, released in 1985. He also would go on to work with Los Angeles-based acts Stealin Horses and Ashton, co-wrote "I Wanna Be Loved", the lead-off single for House of Lords's debut album, and eventually formed the band Katmandü with former Fastway (and current Flogging Molly) vocalist Dave King, with their sole album, a self-titled release, appearing in 1991.

Upon his return to Switzerland, Meyer joined Gotthard from 1996 through 2003 before re-connecting with Krokus in 2005, almost 25 years after his first tenure with the band. In addition to Krokus, Meyer is also a member of German metal band Unisonic.

Klaven joined Krokus in time for 1984's The Blitz, with Keiser following suit for Change of Address and Alive and Screamin', both released in 1986. Following their exit from Krokus, Keiser went on to a short stint with German rockers Craaft, appearing on their 1988 sophomore album, Second Honeymoon, while Klaven eventually teamed up with vocalist Johnny Edwards, fresh out of Foreigner, and former Kingdom Come guitarist Danny Stag, aka Danny Steigerwald, in the band Royal Jelly. The group's eponymous debut album was released in 1994. Meanwhile, Holder remained in Memphis, performing around the area and producing local acts, such as Medieval Steel, Rob Jungklas and Jimmy Davis & Junction. He also became a session musician and sideman for the likes of Tracy Chapman, Travis Tritt, Jonny Lang, Buddy Guy, and Ana Popović.

Jamison died on September 1, 2014, of what was originally thought to be a heart attack (later discovered to be a hemorrhagic brain stroke with "acute methamphetamine intoxication contributing"). Holder died early the following year, following a battle with cancer.

=== One-off reunion ===
On October 25, 2015, the three surviving members of Cobra's classic lineup, Mandy Meyer, Tommy Keiser and Jeff Klaven, reunited for the first time in over 30 years to help pay tribute to their former lead vocalist, the late Jimi Jamison, as part of the star-studded "Jam for Jimi Jamison" at the Hard Rock Cafe in Memphis, Tennessee. They were joined by Jamison's son-in-law, Todd Poole (ex-Roxy Blue, Saliva), Jeffery Wade Caughron and Kory Myers for the occasion, performing songs off the First Strike, as well as a cover of Krokus' "Screaming in the Night".

Meyer also performed Cobra songs, live in 2011, when he teamed up with German vocalist Hagen Grohe, who had featured on Joe Perry's 2009 solo album, Have Guitar, Will Travel, under the name Katmandü, with former Krokus drummer Patrick Aeby, bassist François Mohr, and keyboardist Alan Guy rounding out the lineup. They performed at the Rock Oz'Arènes festival in Avenches, Switzerland on August 4, 2011, playing songs co-written by Meyer and recorded by Cobra, Van Zant, House of Lords, Katmandü and Gotthard as well as a cover of Krokus' "Fire".

== Discography ==
Album	Year	Label	(United Kingdom) UK Import Chart
First Strike	1983	Epic Records	No. 1

=== Other releases ===
The band created material for a second album, all the songs played in live concerts and tours. The songs can be found as 1982 Demos and from both Live Attack and Only You Can Rock Me, the unreleased compilation album from the live presentation in the Memphis TV Club in November 27, 1983. On November 15, 1985, Van Zant released the song "I'm A Fighter" for his album by Geffen Records, written by Meyer, Jamison and Andris, originally written for the planned but never recorded second Cobra album, but they played this record on live performances. The song climbed to No. 30 on the US Billboard singles chart and is a popular anthem in WWF wrestling matches. No. 16 on the Mainstream Rock Tracks chart and it was the theme song for WWE Hall of Famer Paul Orndorff and has a music video (with "Marvelous" Marvin Hagler).

Single	Album	Year	Artist	Label	(United States) US Billboard Album	(United States) US Billboard 100	(United States) US Mainstreak Rock Tracks
"I'm a Fighter"	Van Zant	1985	Van Zant	Geffen Records	No. 170	No. 30	No. 16

In 1994, the Swiss hard rock band Gotthard recorded the Cobra song "Travelin' Man" on their Dial Hard album. The album, released by BMG and produced by former Krokus bass player, Chris von Rohr, peaked at No. 1 on the Swiss Chart and was certified as platinum for exceeding 30,000 sales.

Mandy Meyer, one of the writers of the song, joined Gotthard three years later. In 2002, Gotthard would cover yet another Cobra song, "Looking At You", which appeared on the ballads compilation album One Life One Soul, produced by von Rohr and released by Nuclear Blast.

Single	Album	Year	Artist	Label	(Switzerland) Swiss Chart	Album Certification
"Travelin' Man"	Dial Hard	1994	Gotthard	BMG	No. 1	Platinum
"Looking at You"	One Life One Soul	2002	Gotthard	Nuclear Blast	-	-
