= Made in Switzerland (album) =

Live video and album by Gotthard

Made In Switzerland

Live album + DVD by Gotthard
- Released: 2006
- Recorded: Zürich, Switzerland, December 8, 2005
- Genre: Hard rock
- Length: 152 mins (DVD) / 78 mins (CD)
- Language: English
- Label: Nuclear Blast
- Producer: Rudi Dolezal & Hannes Rossacher

CD chronology
| Lipservice (2005) | Made In Switzerland (2006) | Domino Effect (2007) |

Gotthard DVD chronology
| Made In Switzerland (2006) |

Made In Switzerland is a live video and album release by Gotthard. It was released worldwide in 2006 as a combined DVD and CD package.

The concert was filmed and recorded at the Hallenstadion in Zürich, Switzerland on December 8, 2005 as part of the bands Lipservice tour.

== Track listing ==
=== DVD ===
1. "All We Are"
2. "Dream On"
3. "Hush"
4. "Mountain Mama"
5. "Let It Be"
6. "Top Of The World"
7. "I Wonder"
8. "Said And Done"
9. "One Life One Soul"
10. "Nothing Left At All"
11. "Sister Moon"
12. "The Other Side Of Me"
13. "Fire Dance"
14. "Battle Of Titans"
15. "Homerun"
16. "Mighty Quinn"
17. "In The Name"
18. "Heaven"
19. "Lift U Up"
20. "Anytime Anywhere"
21. "Immigrant Song"

Bonus Material

- Making Of Konzert "Hallenstadion Zürich"
- Making Of Videodreh "Anytime Anywhere"
- Video Clips:
1. Lift U Up
2. Anytime Anywhere
3. Dream On
- Foto-Gallery

=== CD ===
1. "All We Are"
2. "Dream On"
3. "Hush"
4. "Mountain Mama"
5. "Let It Be"
6. "Top Of The World"
7. "I Wonder"
8. "Said And Done"
9. "One Life One Soul"
10. "Nothing Left At All"
11. "Sister Moon"
12. "Mighty Quinn"
13. "In The Name"
14. "Heaven"
15. "Lift U Up"
16. "Anytime Anywhere"
17. "Immigrant Song"

== Charts ==
| Chart (2006) | Peak position |
|---|---|
| German Albums (Offizielle Top 100) | 77 |
| Swiss Albums (Schweizer Hitparade) | 1 |

== Certifications ==
| Region | Certification | Certified units/sales |
|---|---|---|
| Switzerland (IFPI Switzerland) | Platinum | 30,000^{^} |
^{^} Shipments figures based on certification alone.
