= First Strike (album) =

Studio album by Cobra
- Released: 1983
- Recorded: D.B. Studios, Miami, Florida
- Genre: Hard rock
- Length: 41:00
- Label: Epic Records
- Producer: Tom Allom

Singles from First Strike
- 1. "Blood on Your Money" Released: 1983; 2. "Looking at You" Released: 1983; 3. "Travelin' Man" Released: 1983

First Strike is the debut and sole studio album released by Swiss-American hard rock band Cobra. Originally released in 1983 by Epic Records, the record was produced by Tom Allom and remastered in 2008 by Rock Candy. The album in the British music magazine Kerrang! took first place in the import charts. The single "Blood on Your Money" received MTV airplay, while "Looking at You" and "Travelin' Man" received promotion at the Memphis TV Club.

Swiss hard rock band Gotthard covered "Travelin' Man" on their 1994 album, Dial Hard, and "Looking at You" for One Life One Soul - Best of Ballads in 2002. Cobra guitarist Mandy Meyer was a member of Gotthard between 1996 and 2003.

== Track listing ==
| No. | Title | Writer(s) | Length |
|---|---|---|---|
| 1. | "Blood on Your Money" | Mandy Meyer & Tommy Keiser | 3:50 |
| 2. | "Only You Can Rock Me" | Jimi Jamison & Mandy Meyer | 4:15 |
| 3. | "Travelin' Man" | Jimi Jamison, Mandy Meyer & Tommy Andris | 5:12 |
| 4. | "I've Been A Fool Before" | Jack Holder & Jimi Jamison | 4:13 |
| 5. | "First Strike" | Jack Holder & Jimi Jamison | 2:55 |
| 6. | "Danger Zone" | Jimi Jamison & Mandy Meyer | 5:01 |
| 7. | "Looking at You" | Mandy Meyer & Tommy Keiser | 3:50 |
| 8. | "Fallen Angel" | Jeff Klaven & Mandy Meyer | 3:46 |
| 9. | "What Love Is" | Brock Walsh & Greg Prestopino | 4:06 |
| 10. | "Thorn in Your Flesh" | Mandy Meyer & Tommy Keiser | 3:53 |
| Total length: | | | 41:00 |

== Personnel ==
- Jimi Jamison – Lead Vocals
- Mandy Meyer – Lead Guitar
- Jack Holder - Rhythm Guitar, Keyboards
- Tommy Keiser – Bass
- Jeff Klaven – Drums
