= One Life One Soul =

Compilation album by Gotthard
- Released: 2002
- Recorded: 1992–2002
- Genre: Hard rock
- Length: 72:59
- Label: Nuclear Blast
- Producer: Chris von Rohr

Gotthard chronology
Homerun (2001)	One Life One Soul (2002)	Human Zoo (2003)

One Life One Soul, additionally subtitled Best of Ballads, is the first compilation album released by the hard rock band Gotthard. As the title indicates, the album consists only of ballads from Gotthard's studio albums from the albums Gotthard to Homerun, along with new songs and covers.

== Track listing ==
1. Heaven (Radio Version)
2. Ruby Tuesday (Rolling Stones cover)
3. Looking at You (Cobra cover)
4. Let it Rain
5. All I Care For
6. He Ain't Heavy He's My Brother (Kelly Gordon cover, popular by The Hollies)
7. One Life One Soul
8. You
9. Home Run (Radio Version)
10. Father Is That Enough
11. Reason to Live
12. Lonely People (Remix Version)
13. Peace of Mind (New Mix Version)
14. Angel
15. Out On My Own
16. I'm On My Way
17. Love Soul Matter (New Mix Version)
18. Time (Bonus Track) (Contain hidden track - Heaven (Orchestral Version))

== Personnel ==
- Steve Lee – vocals
- Leo Leoni – guitars
- Mandy Meyer – guitars
- Marc Lynn – bass guitar
- Hena Habegger – drums and percussion

== Charts ==
Chart (2002)	Peak position
German Albums (Offizielle Top 100)	60
Swiss Albums (Schweizer Hitparade)	1

== Certifications ==
Region	Certification	Certified units/sales
Switzerland (IFPI Switzerland)	2× Platinum	80,000^{^}
^{^} Shipments figures based on certification alone.
