= Mandy Meyer =

Swiss guitarist (born 1960)

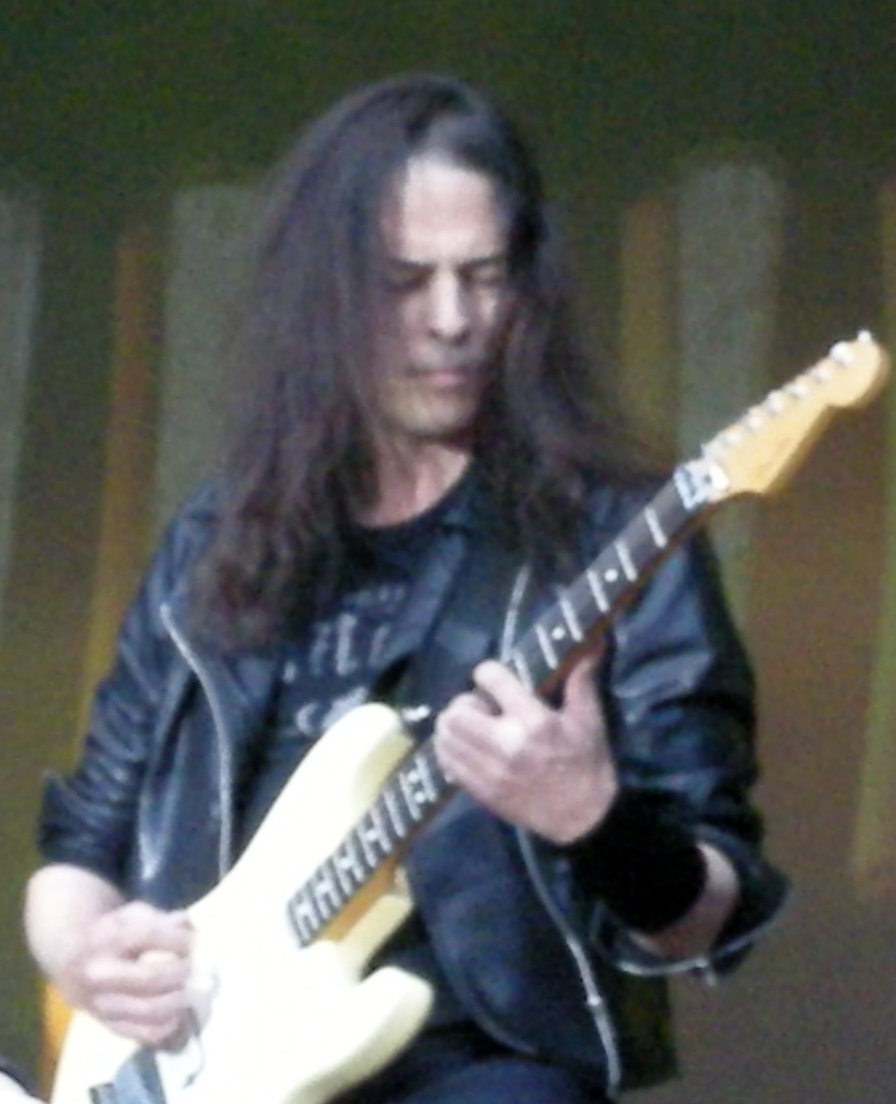
- Meyer with Unisonic at Skogsröjet Festival in Sweden, 2012

Background information
- Born: Armand Meyer; 29 August 1960 (age 66); Balcarres, Saskatchewan, Canada
- Origin: Switzerland
- Genres: Hard rock; heavy metal; progressive rock; power metal
- Occupation: Guitarist
- Years active: 1978–present
- Website: mandymeyer.ch

Armand "Mandy" Meyer (born 29 August 1960) is a Swiss guitarist best known for being a member of the hard rock band Gotthard, the progressive rock band Asia, and the heavy metal band Krokus. He has also worked with Cobra, Stealin' Horses, Katmandu and Unisonic.

== Early years ==
Meyer was born on 29 August 1960 in the town of Balcarres, Saskatchewan, Canada. The son of a Swiss dairy farmer and a Canadian mother, Meyer spent his first three years in Canada. After his parents were divorced his father took him back to Switzerland where he grew up in the house of his grandparents in Küssnacht am Rigi.

Meyer started to play his first instrument, the marching drums, at the age of 9 becoming a member of the local marching drum club for the next seven years. At age 12, he began to study classical guitar and at the age of 15 formed his first local band Quarry performing at parties and local clubs. By 1978, Meyer was the lead vocalist and guitarist for Swiss group BM-Smith who issued the "Chaincy Fever" b/w "Silver City" 7" single that same year and made an appearance on Swiss national TV in 1980 performing the punk rock laced "Do You Wanna Dance", now fronted by female vocalist Vera Kaa.

== International career ==
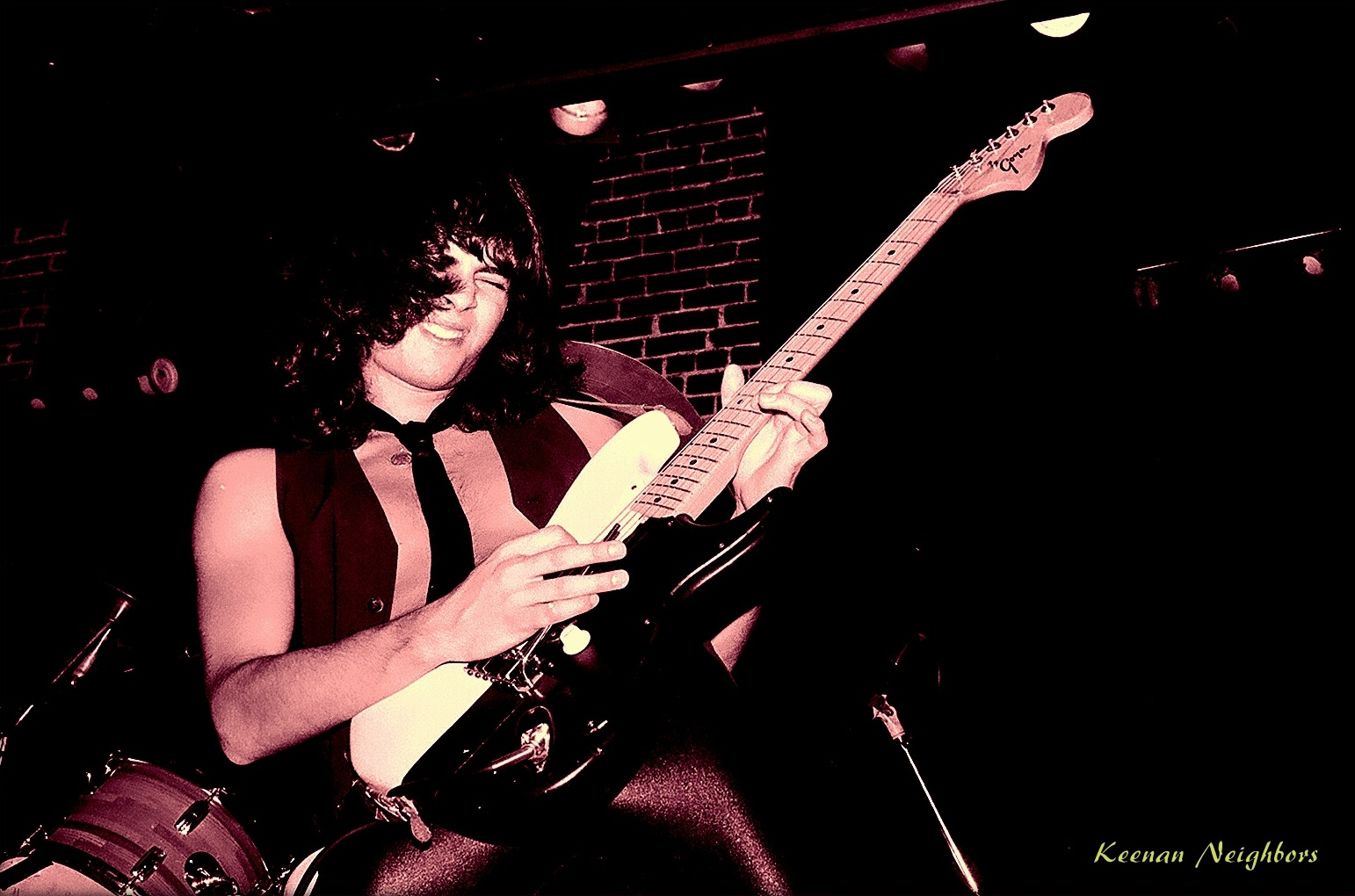
Mandy Meyer playing in Memphis, TN in 1984

In 1980, Meyer was approached by Chris von Rohr, founding member and bass player of Krokus, about joining the band following the departure of Tommy Kiefer. He accepted the offer and toured Europe and the United States for the next two years in support of Krokus's Hardware album. At the end of the touring cycle, Meyer decided to move on and began looking for musicians for his own project, teaming up with two members of Lucerne, Switzerland band Roxane, vocalist Tommy Andris and bassist Tommy Keiser. The trio set off for Memphis, Tennessee in 1982 where Andris was soon replaced by former Target vocalist, Jimi Jamison. Rounding out the line-up were guitarist/keyboardist Jack Holder (ex-Black Oak Arkansas) and drummer Jeff Klaven. Managed by Butch Stone, who was also handling Krokus and Black Oak Arkansas and had managed Target, the fledgling new group, named Cobra, quickly became a fixture on the local Memphis scene and scored a record deal with Epic Records. Cobra would issue their one and only album, the Tom Allom produced First Strike, in 1983. Only a moderate commercial success and plagued by management problems, the band went their separate ways in 1984, with members going on to join Survivor, Krokus, and, in Meyer's case, Asia. An unreleased Cobra song, "I'm A Fighter", would find its way onto Van Zant's self-titled 1985 album and became the theme song for WWE wrestler Paul Orndorff, aka "Mr. Wonderful".

After getting a call from Asia's manager, Brian Lane, upon a recommendation by Geffen Records A&R man, John Kalodner, Meyer agreed to travel to London, England for an audition as the band were looking for a replacement for Steve Howe. The parties hit it off well and Meyer was invited to join the group and take part in the recording of Asia's third album, Astra, issued in late 1985. Not as commercially successful as the first two albums, although the single "Go" was an MTV hit, the record label cancelled the projected tour because of lack of interest. In 1986, Asia folded, bringing the group to an end for the time being, with Meyer moving to Los Angeles, California in 1987. There he began working with the likes of Mark Ashton, Stealin Horses, Nelson, John Waite, and House of Lords, co-writing the latter's lead-off single, "I Wanna Be Loved", off their eponymous 1988 debut album. He would make a lead guitar guest appearance on the band's sophomore album, Sahara, in 1990. Meyer also formed his own band, Katmandü, with Irishman Dave King (ex-Fastway) on lead vocals. The group released a self-titled album on Epic Records in 1991 and did some limited touring before disbanding in the wake of the early 1990s grunge rock avalanche.

== Return to Switzerland ==
Burnt out after seven years in L.A., Meyer decided to move back home to Switzerland in the mid-1990s where he immediately started writing songs and meeting people, including old Krokus bandmate, Chris von Rohr, who had just signed up as producer for Swiss outfit Gotthard. After Gotthard covered an old song of his, Cobra's "Travelin' Man", for their sophomore album, Dial Hard, Meyer joined the group in early 1996 for their "G Spot Tour" in support of the G. album. He would stay on for the next eight years for what would be Gotthard's most commercially successful era, earning numerous gold and platinum awards in Switzerland and expanding the band's fanbase internationally. Gotthard would also record yet another one of Meyer's old Cobra tunes, "Looking At You", for inclusion on 2002's One Life One Soul – Best of Ballads album.

Meyer decided to leave Gotthard in early 2004 due to disagreements with management and at them same time reaching a point where he felt the need to start something new. After contemplating a solo album, he was back with Krokus in 2005, replacing founding member Fernando von Arb on lead guitar, and played on the band's 2006 release, Hellraiser. However, Meyer was out of the line-up again when Krokus' Headhunter era line-up reunited in the spring of 2008.

== Current projects ==
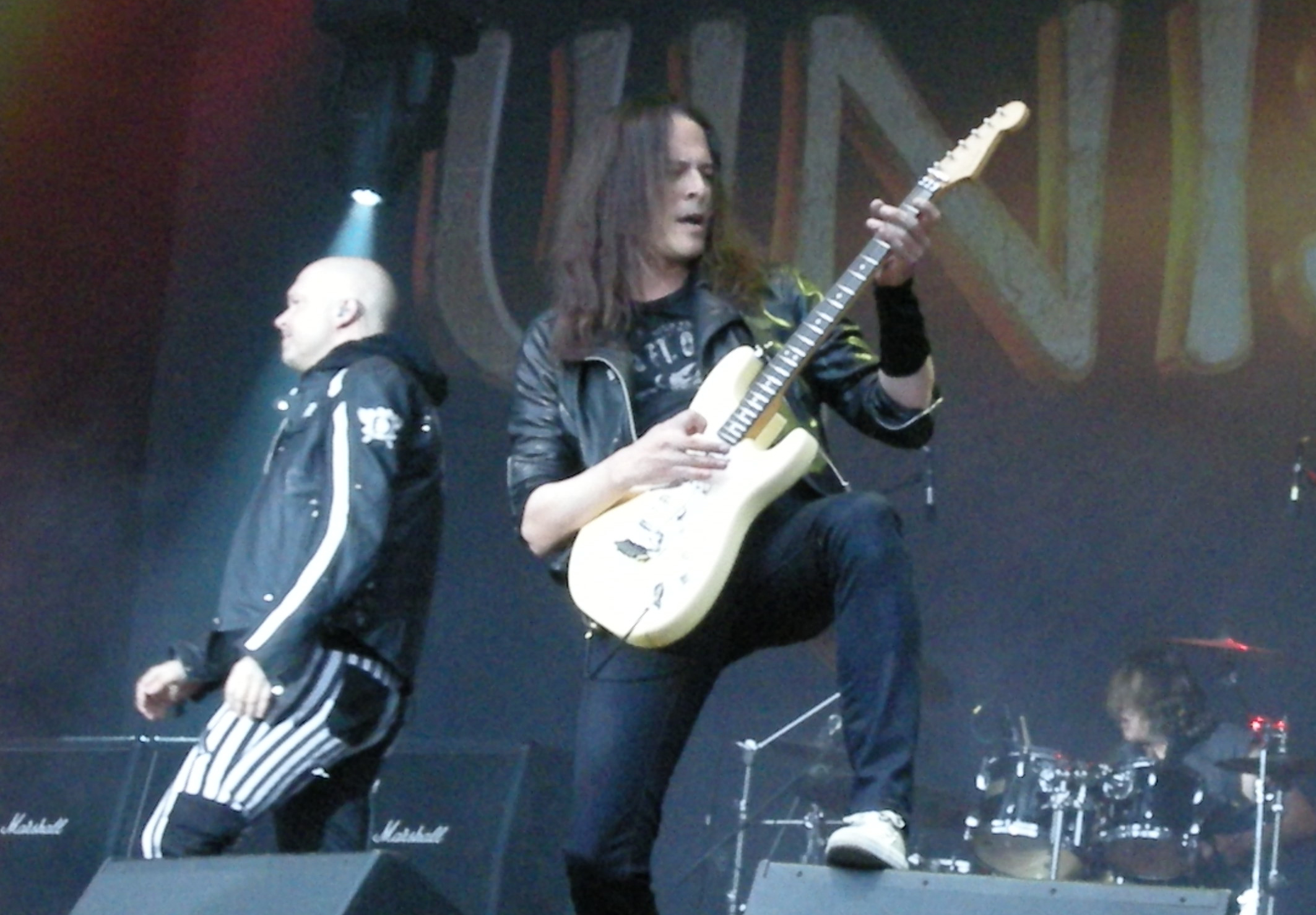
Meyer with Unisonic in 2012

Meyer is a member of Unisonic, formed in 2009 by Pink Cream 69 members, Dennis Ward and Kosta Zafiriou, and former Helloween vocalist Michael Kiske. In 2011, Kiske's old Helloween mate, Kai Hansen (Gamma Ray), was added to the line-up. The group has released 2 EP's and 2 full-length albums so far.

In 2011, Meyer teamed up with German vocalist Hagen Grohe, who had featured on Joe Perry's 2009 solo album, Have Guitar, Will Travel, under the name Katmandü, with former Krokus drummer Patrick Aeby, bassist François Mohr, and keyboardist Alan Guy rounding out the line-up. On 4 August 2011 they performed at the Rock Oz'Arènes festival in Avenches, Switzerland playing Katmandü material and other songs from the Meyer catalogue previously recorded by Cobra, Van Zant, House of Lords, and Gotthard as well as a cover of Krokus' "Fire".

In 2012, Meyer rejoined Krokus as their official sixth member, with the band now featuring a three-guitar line-up which made its studio debut on 2013's Dirty Dynamite.

In March 2020, Meyer announced the formation of a new band named Gotus – half Gotthard, half Krokus in name – featuring one-time Krokus rhythm section, Tony Castell and Patrick Aeby, keyboardist Alain Guy, and Croatian guest vocalist Dino Jelusick. In September 2020, the group released a video for the song "Souls Alive", originally recorded by Meyer with Unisonic on their eponymous 2012 debut album. Gotus made their live debut on the Swiss Rock Cruise one month later, with the setlist consisting of songs co-written by Meyer throughout his career.

== Cobra one-off reunion ==
On 25 October 2015, the three surviving members of Cobra, Mandy Meyer, Tommy Keiser and Jeff Klaven, reunited for the first time in over 30 years to help pay tribute to their former lead vocalist, the late Jimi Jamison, as part of the star-studded "Jam for Jimi Jamison" at the Hard Rock Cafe in Memphis, TN. They were joined by Jamison's son-in-law, Todd Poole (ex-Roxy Blue, Saliva), Jeffery Wade Caughron and Kory Myers for the occasion, performing songs off the First Strike album as well as a cover of Krokus' "Screaming in the Night".

== Discography ==
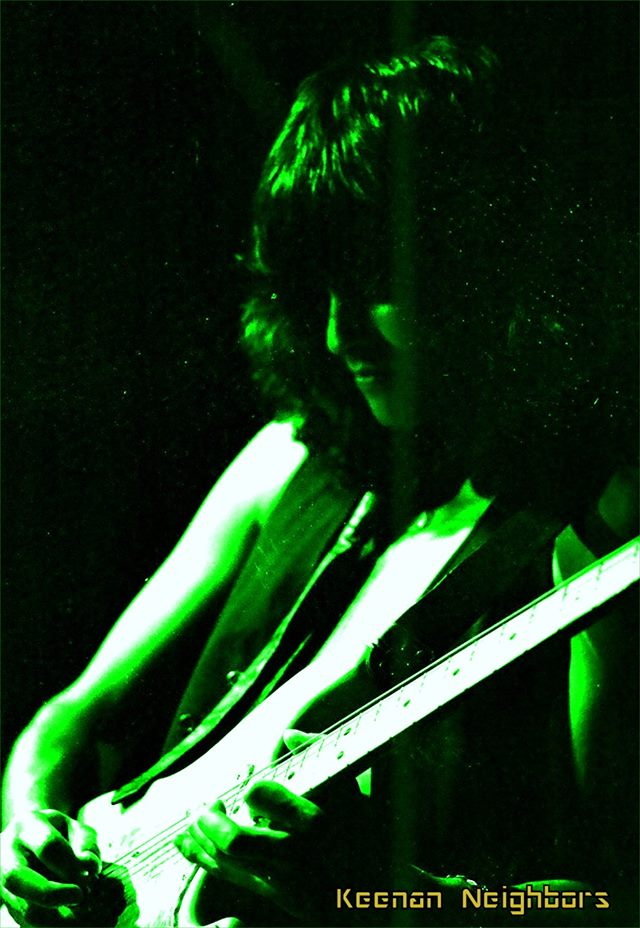
Meyer in 1984

=== Cobra ===
- First Strike (1983)

=== Asia ===
- Astra (1985)
- Then and Now (1990)

=== Stealin Horses ===
- Stealin Horses (1988)

=== Ashton ===
- Modern Pilgrims (1988)

=== Katmandu ===
- Katmandu (1991)

=== Gotthard ===
- D frosted (Live album) (1997)
- Open (1999)
- Homerun (2001)
- Human Zoo (2003)

=== Krokus ===
- Hellraiser (2006)
- Dirty Dynamite (2013)
- Long Stick Goes Boom: Live from da House of Rust (2014)
- Big Rocks (2017)

=== Unisonic ===
- Ignition (2012, EP)
- Unisonic (2012)
- For the Kingdom (2014, EP)
- Light of Dawn (2014)
- Live in Wacken (2017)
