= D Frosted =

Live album by Gotthard
- Released: 29 September 1997
- Genre: Hard rock
- Length: 72:22 (67:11)
- Label: BMG
- Producer: Chris von Rohr

Gotthard chronology
G. (1996)	D Frosted (1997)	Open (1999)

Gotthard live chronology
The Hamburg Tapes (1996)	D Frosted (1997)	Made In Switzerland (2006)

D Frosted is the second live album released by the hard rock band Gotthard. It was released on 29 September 1997 by BMG.

== Track listing ==
All tracks are written by Leo Leoni, Steve Lee and Chris von Rohr except where noted.

No.	Title	Writer(s)	Length
1.	"Sister Moon"		4:33
2.	"Out on My Own"	Leoni, Lee, von Rohr, Vic Vergeat	5:09
3.	"Father Is That Enough?"		3:45
4.	"Let It Be"		4:54
5.	"Hurry"	Leoni, Lee, von Rohr, Vergeat	3:45
6.	"Hole in One"		3:56
7.	"Angel"	Leoni, Lee, Marc Lynn	5:05
8.	"Love Soul Matter"	Leoni, Lee, von Rohr, Vergeat	3:51
9.	"Sweet Little Rock 'n' Roller"	von Rohr, Many Maurer	5:04
10.	"Hush"	Joe South	5:16
11.	"Someday"	Leoni, Lee, von Rohr, Vergeat	3:28
12.	"One Life, One Soul"		4:18
13.	"Get Down"	von Rohr, Maurer	1:59
14.	"Mountain Mama"		3:41
15.	"I'm on My Way"		7:40

Japanese bonus track
No.	Title	Writer(s)	Length
16.	"Mighty Quinn"	Bob Dylan	5:11

== Personnel ==
Gotthard

- Steve Lee – vocals
- Leo Leoni – guitars and backing vocals
- Marc Lynn – bass and backing vocals
- Hena Habegger – drums

Additional musicians

- Mandy Meyer – guitars
- Vic Vergeat – guitars and backing vocals
- Andy Pupato – percussion
- HP Brüggemann – keyboards

== Production ==
- Chris von Rohr – producer
- Thomas Brück – engineer
- Eric Merz – mixing

== Charts ==
Chart (1997)	Peak position
German Albums (Offizielle Top 100)	71
Swiss Albums (Schweizer Hitparade)	1

== Certifications ==
Region	Certification	Certified units/sales
Switzerland (IFPI Switzerland)	2× Platinum	100,000^{^}
^{^} Shipments figures based on certification alone.
