= Need to Believe =

Studio album by Gotthard
- Released: 4 September 2009
- Recorded: 2009
- Genre: Hard rock
- Length: 44:15
- Label: Nuclear Blast
- Producer: Richard Chycki

Gotthard chronology
Domino Effect (2007)	Need to Believe (2009)	Firebirth (2012)

Need to Believe is the ninth studio album released by Swiss hard rock band Gotthard. It was released on 4 September 2009 and is the last album with singer Steve Lee before his death.

In an interview, Lee explained, "We want to encourage. Especially in these times that are full of crisis it is important to believe in something. There is a wonderful saying, that 'will can move mountains'. If you are positively thinking and never give up, you will win in the end. That has always been Gotthard's belief".

The album art, as Lee explained, "shows the philosophy of Gotthard: 'Believe in yourself and do your own thing, even if you think it is impossible sometimes.' Like it seems impossible to press water out of a stone. Need To Believe because faith is essential."

A high quality box version was released including a special gimmick and the bonus track "Ain't Enough".

The band contributed one new song to the film Max Schmeling, a biopic by Uwe Boll about boxer Max Schmeling.

The title track, "Need to Believe", was the album's lead single, which was made available for download 14 August 2009.

The album peaked at No. 1 on the Swiss charts and was certified as Platinum for exceeding 30,000 sales.

== Track listing ==
All lyrics are written by Steve Lee except where noted.

No.	Title	Music	Length
1.	"Shangri La" (Lyrics: Lee, Lynn)	Lee, Fredrik Thomander, Anders Wikström	4:07
2.	"Unspoken Words"	Lee, Leo Leoni, Freddy Scherer	4:24
3.	"Need to Believe"	Lee, Leoni	3:57
4.	"Unconditional Faith" (Lyrics: Lee, Richard Chycki)	Lee, Leoni, Scherer	3:36
5.	"I Don't Mind"	Lee, Leoni, Scherer	3:15
6.	"Break Away" (Lyrics: Lee, Sheri Pedigo)	Lee, Scherer	4:02
7.	"Don't Let Me Down"	Lee, Leoni	4:20
8.	"Right from Wrong"	Lee, Leoni, Scherer	3:45
9.	"I Know, You Know"	Lee, Leoni, Scherer	5:23
10.	"Rebel Soul" (Lyrics: Lee, Chycki)	Lee, Leoni, Scherer	3:27
11.	"Tears to Cry"	Lee, Nicolo Fragile	4:25

Bonus track
No.	Title	Music	Length
12.	"Ain't Enough"	Lee, Leoni, Scherer	4:24

Japanese edition bonus track
No.	Title	Music	Length
13.	"Speed of Light"	Lee, Leoni, Scherer	3:22

== Reception ==
Professional ratings
Review scores
Source	Rating
Hard Rock Hideout	8.5/10 stars
Jukebox:Metal	2/5 stars
Lords of Metal	91/100

The album peaked at No. 1 on the Swiss Charts and stayed for 34 weeks.

== Personnel ==
Gotthard

- Steve Lee – vocals
- Leo Leoni – guitars
- Freddy Scherer – guitars
- Marc Lynn – bass
- Hena Habegger – drums

Additional musician

- Nicolo Fragile – keyboards

Production

- Richard Chycki – producer and engineer

== Charts ==
=== Weekly charts ===
Chart (2009)	Peak position
Austrian Albums (Ö3 Austria)	28
German Albums (Offizielle Top 100)	8
French Albums (SNEP)	121
Swedish Albums (Sverigetopplistan)	30
Swiss Albums (Schweizer Hitparade)	1

=== Year-end charts ===
Chart (2009)	Position
Swiss Albums (Schweizer Hitparade)	11

Chart (2010)	Position
Swiss Albums (Schweizer Hitparade)	54

== Certifications ==
Region	Certification	Certified units/sales
Switzerland (IFPI Switzerland)	2× Platinum	60,000^{^}
^{^} Shipments figures based on certification alone.
