= Unisonic (album) =

Studio album by Unisonic
- Released: March 21, 2012 (Japan); March 30, 2012 (Europe); May 22, 2012 (USA)
- Recorded: ICP Studios, Brussel, Belgium, HOFA Studios, Karlsdorf, Hammer Studios, Hamburg, Germany, 2012
- Genre: Hard rock, power metal
- Length: 55:20
- Label: earMUSIC
- Producer: Dennis Ward, Kai Hansen

Unisonic chronology
Ignition (2012)	Unisonic (2012)	For the Kingdom (2014)

Professional ratings
Review scores
Source	Rating
Hard Rock Haven	10/10 stars
Planetmosh	10/10 stars
Rock Hard	8/10

Unisonic is the debut album by the hard rock/power metal band Unisonic. It was released in 2012 on earMUSIC. The album is the group's first full-length studio release and since Keeper of the Seven Keys: Part II (1988) by Helloween the first album to feature both Kai Hansen and Michael Kiske performing on all songs.

== Production ==
The majority of the songs were written by Dennis Ward and Kai Hansen, with further input from Mandy Meyer and Michael Kiske. A music video was filmed for the song Unisonic on YouTube.

The album was released on 21 March 2012 in Japan, on 30 March 2012 in Europe and on 22 May 2012 in the US, with cover art credited to Martin Häusler. The album became available in several special editions, such as the European (mediabook), the Japanese and the US, each containing a different bonus track.

Unisonic's debut album entered several international music charts, scoring the highest points on the Finnish albums chart, Japanese albums chart, German albums chart, and Swedish albums chart.

== Accolades ==
In Burrn! magazine's 2012 Readers Poll, Unisonic ranked at #2 (behind Accept's Stalingrad) for Best Album and the title track won Best Song.

== Track listing ==
No.	Title	Lyrics	Music	Length
1.	"Unisonic"	Dennis Ward, Kai Hansen	Mandy Meyer, Hansen	3:25
2.	"Souls Alive"	Ward	Meyer	5:13
3.	"Never Too Late"	Hansen	Hansen	4:30
4.	"I’ve Tried"	Ward	Ward	4:56
5.	"Star Rider"	Ward, Hansen	Ward	4:16
6.	"Never Change Me"	Hansen	Hansen	3:44
7.	"Over the Rainbow (European bonus track)"	Hansen	Hansen	5:16
8.	"Renegade"	Ward	Ward	4:38
9.	"My Sanctuary"	Ward	Ward, Hansen	4:16
10.	"King for a Day"	Hansen	Hansen	4:07
11.	"We Rise"	Ward	Ward, Hansen	4:43
12.	"No One Ever Sees Me"	Michael Kiske	Kiske	6:13
13.	"The Morning After (Japanese bonus track)"	Kiske, Ward	Meyer	4:03
14.	"I Want Out (live at Loud Park) (North American bonus track)"	Hansen	Hansen	5:34
Total length:				64:54

== Personnel ==
- Michael Kiske - lead vocals
- Kai Hansen - lead & rhythm guitars, backing vocals, co-producer
- Mandy Meyer - lead & rhythm guitars
- Dennis Ward - bass, backing vocals, producer, engineer, mixing
- Kosta Zafiriou - drums, percussion

Guest session musician

- Günter Werno - keyboards on tracks 2, 4 & 12

== Charts ==
Chart (2012)	Peak position
Austrian Albums (Ö3 Austria)	59
Finnish Albums (Suomen virallinen lista)	8
French Albums (SNEP)	140
German Albums (Offizielle Top 100)	24
Italian Albums (FIMI)	90
Japanese Albums (Oricon)	19
Swedish Albums (Sverigetopplistan)	29
Swiss Albums (Schweizer Hitparade)	44
