= Out on My Own (disambiguation) =

"Out on My Own" is a song by Michelle, the Dutch entry in the Eurovision Song Contest 2001.

Out on My Own may also refer to:

- Out on My Own, a 2004 album by Edwina Hayes
- Out on My Own, a 1984 album by Sheila Chandra
- "Out on My Own", song by Keith Urban from his 1999 album Keith Urban
- "Out on My Own", song by Gotthard from D Frosted
