= Lonely Heartache =

Lonely Heartache or Lonely Heartaches may refer to:

- "Lonely Heartache", a song by Gotthard from their self-titled debut album
- "Lonely Heartache", a song by Barbara Lynn on the B-side to her single "You'll Lose a Good Thing"
- Lonely Heartaches, an album and its title track by Goldie Hill
- "Lonely Heartaches", a single by the Clarendonians
