= For the Kingdom =

EP by Unisonic
- Released: May 23, 2014
- Recorded: HOFA Studios (Germany) and The Trakshak (Germany)
- Genre: Hard rock, power metal
- Length: 29:22
- Label: EarMusic Edel AG
- Producer: Dennis Ward

Unisonic chronology
Unisonic (2012)	For the Kingdom (2014)	Light of Dawn (2014)

For the Kingdom is an EP by the rock band Unisonic. It was released in 2014 on EarMusic Edel AG. The album contains one future album track, an exclusive song, and four live tracks recorded during the band's Masters Of Rock Festival performance in 2012. The cover art is credited to Martin Häusler.

== Track listing ==
No.	Title	Lyrics	Music	Length
1.	"For the Kingdom"	Dennis Ward	Ward	4:58
2.	"You Come Undone" (EP exclusive song)	Ward	Ward	3:48
3.	"Unisonic" (live)	Ward/Kai Hansen	Mandy Meyer/Hansen	6:00
4.	"Never Too Late" (live)	Hansen	Hansen	4:36
5.	"Star Rider" (live)	Ward/Hansen	Ward	4:07
6.	"Souls Alive" (live)	Ward	Meyer	5:53
Total length:				29:22

== Personnel ==
- Michael Kiske – Vocals
- Kai Hansen – Guitars, backing vocals
- Mandy Meyer – Guitars
- Dennis Ward – Bass guitar, backing vocals
- Kosta Zafiriou – Drums

'Guest Session Musician

- Günter Werno – Keyboard on tracks 1 & 2

=== Additional Personnel ===
- Mixed by Dennis Ward
- Mastered by Jürgen Lusky (tracks 1 & 2)
- Recorded by Dennis Ward (tracks 1 & 2)
- Artwork and Design by Martin Häusler
