= Live in Wacken (Unisonic album) =

Live album by Unisonic
- Released: July 21, 2017
- Recorded: Wacken Open Air Festival (Germany), 2016
- Genre: Power metal, hard rock
- Length: 58:58
- Label: earMUSIC
- Producer: Dennis Ward

Unisonic chronology
Light of Dawn (2014)	Live in Wacken (Unisonic album) (2017)

Professional ratings
Review scores
Source	Rating
Planetmosh	5/5 stars
Sea Of Tranquility	4/5 stars
Bravewords	7/10 stars

Live in Wacken is the first live album by the hard rock/power metal band Unisonic. The album was recorded during the band's performance at Wacken Open Air Festival on August 5, 2016.

The album includes a bonus DVD, which contains the video footage of 6 songs.

== Track listing ==
No.	Title	Lyrics	Music	Length
1.	"Venite 2.0"		Günter Werno	1:40
2.	"For the Kingdom"	Dennis Ward	Ward	4:51
3.	"Exceptional"	Ward	Ward	4:52
4.	"My Sanctuary"	Ward	Ward, Kai Hansen	4:46
5.	"King for a Day"	Hansen	Hansen	4:14
6.	"A Little Time" (with Victim of Changes medley) (Helloween cover)	Michael Kiske	Kiske	5:59
7.	"Your Time Has Come"	Ward	Ward	5:09
8.	"When the Deed Is Done"	Ward	Ward	5:31
9.	"Star Rider"	Ward, Hansen	Ward, Hansen	6:02
10.	"Throne of the Dawn"	Ward	Ward	5:54
11.	"March of Time" (Helloween cover)	Hansen	Hansen	5:17
12.	"Unisonic"	Ward, Hansen	Mandy Meyer, Hansen	4:43

Bonus DVD

No.	Title	Length
1.	"For the Kingdom"	6:32
2.	"Exceptional"	4:52
3.	"Your Time Has Come"	5:09
4.	"When the Deed Is Done"	5:31
5.	"March of Time" (Helloween cover)	5:15
6.	"Unisonic"	4:43
Total length:		31:55

== Personnel ==
- Michael Kiske - lead vocals
- Kai Hansen - lead & rhythm guitars, backing vocals
- Mandy Meyer - lead & rhythm guitars
- Dennis Ward - bass, backing vocals, producer, engineer, mixing
- Kosta Zafiriou - drums, percussion
