= Live in Wacken =

Live in Wacken may refer to:

- Live in Wacken, a 2013 album by Bonfire
- Live in Wacken, a 2017 album by Unisonic
