= Firebirth =

Studio album by Gotthard
- Released: 2012
- Recorded: 2011–2012
- Studio: Yellow House Studio 13, Lugano, Switzerland
- Genre: Hard rock
- Length: 44:15
- Label: Nuclear Blast
- Producer: Paul Lani, Leo Leoni

Gotthard chronology
Need to Believe (2009)	Firebirth (2012)	Bang! (2014)

Professional ratings
Review scores
Source	Rating
AllMusic	(favourable)
Classic Rock	6/10 stars
Metal Hammer (GER)	6/7
Rock Hard	8.5/10

Firebirth is the tenth studio album released by Swiss hard rock band Gotthard. It is the first album with singer Nic Maeder after Steve Lee's death.

== Track listing ==
All tracks are written by Leo Leoni, Nic Maeder and Freddy Scherer, except where noted.

No.	Title	Length
1.	"Starlight"	4:27
2.	"Give Me Real"	3:38
3.	"Remember It's Me"	3:27
4.	"Fight"	3:25
5.	"Yippie Aye Yay" (Marc Lynn, Maeder, Scherer, Leoni, Paul Lani)	4:37
6.	"Tell Me" (Leoni, Maeder)	3:15
7.	"Shine"	3:48
8.	"The Story's Over"	4:09
9.	"Right On"	3:52
10.	"S.O.S."	3:22
11.	"Take It All Back"	3:16
12.	"I Can"	3:10
13.	"Where Are You" (Leoni)	4:19

Bonus tracks
No.	Title	Length
14.	"Love You Honey"	3:04
15.	"Starlight" (acoustic version)	3:56
16.	"While My Guitar Gently Weeps" (George Harrison)	5:35

== Personnel ==
Gotthard

- Nic Maeder – vocals
- Leo Leoni – guitars, keyboards on track 13, producer, engineer, mixing on track 15
- Freddy Scherer – guitars
- Marc Lynn – bass guitar
- Hena Habegger – drums and percussion

Additional musicians

- Matthias Ulmer – keyboards

Production

- Paul Lani – producer, engineer, mixing
- Davide Pagano – engineer, mixing on track 15
- Charlie Bauerfeind – mastering

== Charts ==
=== Weekly charts ===
Chart (2012)	Peak position
Austrian Albums (Ö3 Austria)	33
German Albums (Offizielle Top 100)	9
French Albums (SNEP)	187
Swedish Albums (Sverigetopplistan)	49
Swiss Albums (Schweizer Hitparade)	1

=== Year-end charts ===
Chart (2012)	Position
Swiss Albums (Schweizer Hitparade)	11

== Certifications ==
Region	Certification	Certified units/sales
Switzerland (IFPI Switzerland)	Gold	15,000^{^}
^{^} Shipments figures based on certification alone.
