= Dial Hard =

Studio album by Gotthard
- Released: 1994
- Genre: Hard rock
- Length: 51:08 (61:09)
- Label: BMG
- Producer: Chris von Rohr

Gotthard chronology
Gotthard (1992)	Dial Hard (1994)	G. (1996)

Professional ratings
Review scores
Source	Rating
Allmusic	(?)

Dial Hard is the second studio album released by the hard rock band Gotthard. It peaked at #1 on the Swiss Charts and was certified as platinum for exceeding 30,000 sales.

== Track listing ==
All songs written by Steve Lee/Leo Leoni/Chris von Rohr except where noted.

1. "Higher" – 4:32
2. "Mountain Mama" – 3:52
3. "Here Comes the Heat" – 3:01
4. "She Goes Down" – 4:52
5. "I'm Your Travelin' Man" – 5:25 (Jimi Jamison/Mandy Meyer/Tommy Andris)
6. "Love For Money" – 3:40
7. "Get It While You Can" – 5:42
8. "Come Together" – 4:47 (John Lennon/Paul McCartney)
9. "Dirty Devil Rock" – 4:15
10. "Open Fire" – 4:56
11. "I'm On My Way" – 5:57

Asian version (BMG BVCP-692) adds the following

12. "Good Time Lover" (Live version) – 5:16
13. "Rock and Roll" (Live version) – 4:45 (Jimmy Page/John Paul Jones/Robert Plant/John Bonham)
- Track 5 originally recorded by Cobra on the album First Strike
- Track 8 originally recorded by The Beatles on the album Abbey Road
- Track 13 originally recorded by Led Zeppelin on the album Led Zeppelin IV

== Personnel ==
- Steve Lee – vocals
- Leo Leoni – guitars and vocals
- Marc Lynn – bass guitar
- Hena Habegger – drums

Guests:

- Pat Regan – keyboards
- Steve Bishop – lead guitar (Tracks 5 & 11)
- Steve Bailey – bass guitar (Tracks 9 & 11)

== Production ==
- Produced by Chris von Rohr
- Mixing – Phil Kaffel

== Charts ==
=== Weekly charts ===
Chart (1994)	Peak position
German Albums (Offizielle Top 100)	60
Swiss Albums (Schweizer Hitparade)	1

=== Year-end charts ===
Chart (1994)	Position
Swiss Albums (Schweizer Hitparade)	14

== Certifications ==
Region	Certification	Certified units/sales
Switzerland (IFPI Switzerland)	Platinum	50,000^{^}
^{^} Shipments figures based on certification alone.
