= Open (Gotthard album) =

Studio album by Gotthard
- Released: 1998
- Genre: Hard rock
- Length: 51:08 (54:06)
- Label: BMG
- Producer: Chris von Rohr

Gotthard chronology
G. (1996)	Open (1998)	Homerun (2001)

Professional ratings
Review scores
Source	Rating
Allmusic	

Open is the fourth studio album released by the hard rock band Gotthard. It peaked at #1 on the Swiss Charts and was certified as 2× Platinum for exceeding 60,000 sales.

== Track listing ==
All tracks are written by Leo Leoni, Steve Lee and Chris von Rohr, except where noted.

No.	Title	Writer(s)	Length
1.	"Free and Alive"		4:21
2.	"Vision"	Mandy Meyer, Lee, von Rohr	3:55
3.	"Got to Be Love"		4:13
4.	"Let It Rain"		4:35
5.	"Blackberry Way"	Roy Wood	3:39
6.	"You"	Meyer, Lee, von Rohr	4:18
7.	"Cheat & Hide"		3:56
8.	"Want You In"	Meyer, Lee	3:18
9.	"Tell No Lies"		3:43
10.	"Back to You"		3:58
11.	"Best Time"		4:14
12.	"Hey Jimi"		3:42
13.	"Peace of Mind"		2:58

Japanese bonus track
No.	Title	Length
14.	"Mad Love"	2:59

2009 SHM-CD bonus tracks
No.	Title	Writer(s)	Length
14.	"Mad Love"		2:59
15.	"Cheat & Hide (Special 7-After-Midnight-Rough-Mix)"		3:58
16.	"Blackberry Way (Exotic Spaceball Dance Mix)"	Wood	4:41
17.	"Merry X-Mas"	Leoni, Lee	5:27
18.	"Merry X-Mas (Radio Edit)"	Leoni, Lee	4:29
19.	"Overtime X-Mas Jam"	Leoni, Lee	1:50

== Personnel ==
- Steve Lee – vocals
- Leo Leoni – guitars and vocals
- Mandy Meyer – guitars
- Marc Lynn – bass guitar
- Hena Habegger – drums

Guests:

- Andy Pupato – percussion
- Max Lasser – slide guitar, steel guitar and dobro
- H. P. Bruggermann – keyboards, piano and Hammond organ

== Production ==
- Mixing – Paul Lani

== Charts ==
=== Weekly charts ===
Chart (1999)	Peak position
Austrian Albums (Ö3 Austria)	40
German Albums (Offizielle Top 100)	21
Swiss Albums (Schweizer Hitparade)	1

=== Year-end charts ===
Chart (1999)	Position
Swiss Albums (Schweizer Hitparade)	6

== Certifications ==
Region	Certification	Certified units/sales
Switzerland (IFPI Switzerland)	2× Platinum	100,000^{^}
^{^} Shipments figures based on certification alone.
