= Human Zoo (Gotthard album) =

Studio album by Gotthard
- Released: 2003
- Genre: Hard rock
- Length: 49:35 (53:40)
- Label: BMG
- Producer: Marc Tanner

Gotthard chronology
Homerun (2001)	Human Zoo (2003)	Lipservice (2005)

Human Zoo is the sixth studio album released by the hard rock band Gotthard.

The album peaked at #1 on the Swiss Charts and was certified as 2× Platinum for exceeding 60,000 sales.

== Track listing ==
All tracks are written by Steve Lee, Leo Leoni and Marc Tanner, except where noted

No.	Title	Writer(s)	Length
1.	"Human Zoo"		3:30
2.	"What I Like"	Lee, Mandy Meyer, Tanner	4:31
3.	"Have a Little Faith"		3:52
4.	"Top of the World"	Lee, Leoni, Meyer, Tanner	3:48
5.	"Janie's Not Alone"		4:16
6.	"Still I Belong to You"	Lee, Leoni, Tanner, Paul Mirkovich	4:35
7.	"One in a Million"		3:19
8.	"No Tomorrow"		5:20
9.	"First Time in a Long Time"	Lee, Leoni, Tanner, Alison Ray	4:32
10.	"Where I Belong"	Lee, Leoni, Meyer, Tanner	3:23
11.	"Long Way Down"		4:02
12.	"What Can I Do"		4:27

Japanese bonus track
No.	Title	Writer(s)	Length
13.	"Never Surrender"	Lee, Leoni	4:05

== Personnel ==
- Steve Lee – vocals
- Leo Leoni – guitars
- Marc Lynn – bass
- Hena Habegger – drums and percussion
- Mandy Meyer – guitars

== Production ==
- Mixing – Paul Lani

== Charts ==
=== Weekly charts ===
Chart (2003)	Peak position
German Albums (Offizielle Top 100)	29
Swiss Albums (Schweizer Hitparade)	1

=== Year-end charts ===
Chart (2003)	Position
Swiss Albums (Schweizer Hitparade)	24

== Certifications ==
Region	Certification	Certified units/sales
Switzerland (IFPI Switzerland)	2× Platinum	80,000^{^}
^{^} Shipments figures based on certification alone.
