= Bang! (Gotthard album) =

Studio album by Gotthard
- Released: 14 April 2014
- Recorded: September 2013 – January 2014 at Yellow House Studios (Lugano, Switzerland), Dutch Wisseloord Studios (album mixing)
- Genre: Hard rock
- Length: 62:43
- Label: G Records, The End Records (North America)
- Producer: Leo Leoni; Charlie Bauerfeind

Gotthard chronology
Firebirth (2012)	Bang! (2014)	Silver (2017)

Singles from Bang!
- 1. "Feel What I Feel" Released: 31 January 2014; 2. "Bang!" Released: 4 June 2014; 3. "Thank You" Released: 5 May 2015

Bang! is the eleventh studio album released by Swiss hard rock band Gotthard. It was released on 14 April 2014 in Europe, through G Records, and on 24 June in North America via The End Records. The album produced 3 singles: "Feel What I Feel", the title track "Bang!" and "Thank You". On 14 October 2014, the band released a video clip for "C'est La Vie".

On 21 November 2014, Gotthard was presented in Chur with a Platinum Award for having sold more than 20.000 copies of the album in Switzerland.

== Track listing ==
All tracks are written by Leo Leoni, Nic Maeder and Freddy Scherer, except where noted.

No.	Title	Length
1.	"Let Me in Katie" (Dennis Ward)	0:39
2.	"Bang!" (Leoni, Maeder, Scherer, Danny Lee)	3:55
3.	"Get Up 'n' Move On"	3:55
4.	"Feel What I Feel"	4:14
5.	"C’est La Vie"	4:11
6.	"Jump the Gun"	3:39
7.	"Spread Your Wings"	5:35
8.	"I Won't Look Down"	4:17
9.	"My Belief"	4:34
10.	"Maybe" (Duet Version)	4:28
11.	"Red on a Sleeve"	3:56
12.	"What You Get"	4:57
13.	"Mr. Ticket Man"	3:30
14.	"Thank You"	10:53
Total length:		62:43

U.S. bonus tracks
No.	Title	Length
15.	"I Want It All"	3:03
16.	"You Can't Stop Me"	4:39
17.	"My Daddy Told Me"	2:58
Total length:		73:23

== Personnel ==
Gotthard

- Nic Maeder – vocals
- Leo Leoni – guitars, production
- Freddy Scherer – guitars
- Marc Lynn – bass
- Hena Habegger – drums

Session musicians

- Melody Tibbits – backing vocals on "C'est La Vie"; vocals on "Maybe (Duet version)"

== Charts ==
=== Weekly charts ===
Chart (2014)	Peak position
Austrian Albums (Ö3 Austria)	23
Belgian Albums (Ultratop Flanders)	191
German Albums (Offizielle Top 100)	10
French Albums (SNEP)	109
Swiss Albums (Schweizer Hitparade)	1
UK Rock & Metal Albums (OCC)	31

=== Year-end charts ===
Chart (2014)	Position
Swiss Albums (Schweizer Hitparade)	13
