= Homerun (Gotthard album) =

Studio album by Gotthard
- Released: 17 January 2001
- Genre: Hard rock
- Length: 48:47
- Label: BMG
- Producer: Chris von Rohr; Leo Leoni

Gotthard chronology
Open (1999)	Homerun (2001)	Human Zoo (2003)

Homerun is the fifth studio album by Swiss hard rock band Gotthard. It was released on 17 January 2001 through BMG. It peaked at number 1 on the Swiss charts and was certified as 3× Platinum for exceeding 90,000 sales. It is Gotthard's best-selling album, selling nearly 120,000 copies in Switzerland only.

== Track listing ==
All tracks are written by Steve Lee, Leo Leoni and Chris von Rohr, except where noted.

No.	Title	Length
1.	"Wun Ga-Li" (Marc Lynn)	0:29
2.	"Everything Can Change" (Lee, Mandy Meyer, von Rohr)	4:02
3.	"Take It Easy" (Andy Taylor, Steve Jones)	3:41
4.	"Light in Your Eyes"	3:56
5.	"Heaven"	4:33
6.	"Lonely People"	3:24
7.	"Eagle"	5:06
8.	"End of Time"	3:25
9.	"Say Goodbye"	4:23
10.	"Reason to Live" (Lee, Meyer, von Rohr)	4:51
11.	"Come Along"	4:49
12.	"Homerun"	6:10

Japanese edition bonus track
No.	Title	Length
13.	"Dirty Weekend" (Lee, Leoni)	3:47

== Personnel ==
- Steve Lee – vocals
- Leo Leoni – guitar, vocals
- Mandy Meyer – guitar
- Marc Lynn – bass
- Hena Habegger – drums, percussion

== Charts ==
=== Weekly charts ===
Chart (2001)	Peak position
Austrian Albums (Ö3 Austria)	51
German Albums (Offizielle Top 100)	14
Swiss Albums (Schweizer Hitparade)	1

=== Year-end charts ===
Chart (2001)	Position
Swiss Albums (Schweizer Hitparade)	1

== Certifications ==
Region	Certification	Certified units/sales
Switzerland (IFPI Switzerland)	3× Platinum	120,000^{^}
^{^} Shipments figures based on certification alone.
