= Ignition (EP) =

EP by Unisonic
- Released: January 27, 2012
- Recorded: ICP Studios (Belgium) and HOFA Studios (Germany)
- Genre: Hard rock, power metal
- Length: 18:20
- Label: EarMusic Edel AG
- Producer: Dennis Ward

Unisonic chronology
Ignition (2012)	Unisonic (2012)

Ignition is the first EP by the hard rock/power metal band Unisonic. It features 2 future album tracks, a demo song and a live version of the Helloween classic "I Want Out". It was released on January 27, 2012.

== Track listing ==
No.	Title	Lyrics	Music	Length
1.	"Unisonic"	Dennis Ward/Kai Hansen	Mandy Meyer/Hansen	3:22
2.	"My Sanctuary"	Ward	Ward/Hansen	4:13
3.	"Souls Alive" (Demo Version)	Ward	Meyer	5:11
4.	"I Want Out" (Live Version)	Hansen	Hansen	5:32

== Personnel ==
- Michael Kiske – Vocals
- Kai Hansen – Guitars
- Mandy Meyer – Guitars
- Dennis Ward – Bass guitar
- Kosta Zafiriou – Drums
