= Silver (Gotthard album) =

Studio album by Gotthard
- Released: January 13, 2017
- Recorded: 2016 at Yellow House Studios (Lugano, Switzerland)
- Genre: Hard rock
- Length: 48:35
- Label: G Records
- Producer: Leo Leoni; Charlie Bauerfeind

Gotthard chronology
Bang! (2014)	Silver (2017)	Defrosted 2 (Live) (2018)

Singles from Silver
- 1. "Stay With Me" Released: November 18, 2016

Silver is the twelfth studio album released by the Swiss hard rock band Gotthard. It was released on 13 January 2017 through G Records. The album was intended to celebrate the band's 25th anniversary, and its name is a reference to a silver wedding anniversary. The album produced one single, "Stay With Me", released on 18 November 2016.

== Track listing ==
All tracks are written by Nic Maeder, Leo Leoni and Freddy Scherer, except where noted.

No.	Title	Length
1.	"Silver River"	3:39
2.	"Electrified"	4:00
3.	"Stay with Me"	3:58
4.	"Beautiful"	3:52
5.	"Everything Inside"	3:49
6.	"Reason for This"	3:12
7.	"Not Fooling Anyone"	2:57
8.	"Miss Me"	3:50
9.	"Tequila Symphony No. 5"	4:11
10.	"Why" (Marc Lynn, Maeder, Leoni, Scherer)	3:26
11.	"Only Love Is Real"	3:26
12.	"My Oh My"	4:45
13.	"Blame on Me" (Lynn, Maeder, Leoni, Scherer)	3:30

Bonus Tracks
No.	Title	Length
14.	"Walk On"	3:37
15.	"Customized Lovin'"	3:44

Japan Bonus Track
No.	Title	Length
16.	"Comin' Your Way"	3:15

== Personnel ==
Gotthard

- Nic Maeder – vocals
- Leo Leoni – guitars, production
- Freddy Scherer – guitars
- Marc Lynn – bass
- Hena Habegger – drums

== Charts ==
Chart (2017)	Peak position
Austrian Albums (Ö3 Austria)	7
Belgian Albums (Ultratop Flanders)	85
Belgian Albums (Ultratop Wallonia)	112
French Albums (SNEP)	158
German Albums (Offizielle Top 100)	7
Swiss Albums (Schweizer Hitparade)	1
UK Independent Albums (OCC)	43
UK Rock & Metal Albums (OCC)	24
