= Lipservice =

Studio album by Gotthard
- Released: June 5, 2005
- Genre: Hard rock
- Length: 53:08
- Label: Nuclear Blast
- Producer: Leo Leoni, Ronald Prent

Gotthard chronology
Human Zoo (2003)	Lipservice (2005)	Domino Effect (2007)

Lipservice is the seventh studio album by the hard rock band Gotthard. It was released in 2005 on Nuclear Blast. The album reached No. 1 on the Swiss charts, and was certified as Platinum for exceeding 30,000 sales.

== Track listing ==
No.	Title	Lyrics	Music	Length
1.	"All We Are"	Steve Lee, Mary Susan Applegate, Fredrik Thomander	Lee, Leo Leoni, Freddy Scherer, Anders Wikstroem, Thomander	3:38
2.	"Dream On"	Applegate, Lee	Lee, Scherer	3:24
3.	"Lift U Up"	Lee, Applegate	Lee, Leoni, Wikstroem, Thomander	2:58
4.	"Everything I Want"	Lee	Lee, Leoni	4:32
5.	"Cupid's Arrow"	Lee	Lee, Leoni, Wikstroem, Thomander	3:46
6.	"I Wonder"	Lee, Applegate	Lee, Leoni, Wikstroem, Thomander	4:23
7.	"I'm Alive"	Lee, Applegate	Lee, Leoni, Scherer	2:59
8.	"I've Seen an Angel Cry"	Lee, Leoni, Applegate	Lee, Leoni	4:47
9.	"Stay for the Night"	Lee	Lee, Leoni	3:26
10.	"Anytime Anywhere"	Lee, Applegate	Lee, Leoni	4:16
11.	"Said & Done"	Lee	Lee, Scherer	3:22
12.	"The Other Side of Me"	Lee, Applegate	Lee, Leoni, Wikstroem, Thomander	4:02
13.	"Nothing Left at All"	Lee	Lee, Leoni, Scherer	3:56
14.	"And Then Goodbye"	Leoni	Leoni	3:33

== Personnel ==
Gotthard

- Steve Lee – lead vocals
- Leo Leoni – guitars, backing vocals
- Marc Lynn – bass
- Hena Habegger – drums, percussion
- Freddy Scherer – guitars

Additional musician

- Nicolo Fragile – keyboards

== Charts ==
=== Weekly charts ===
Chart (2005)	Peak position
Austrian Albums (Ö3 Austria)	58
German Albums (Offizielle Top 100)	31
Swiss Albums (Schweizer Hitparade)	1

=== Year-end charts ===
Chart (2005)	Position
Swiss Albums (Schweizer Hitparade)	4

== Certifications ==
Region	Certification	Certified units/sales
Switzerland (IFPI Switzerland)	Platinum	40,000^{^}
^{^} Shipments figures based on certification alone.
