= Stereo Crush =

Studio album by Gotthard
- Released: 21 March 2025
- Genre: Hard rock
- Label: Reigning Phoenix
- Producers: Charlie Bauerfeind; Leo Leoni

Gotthard chronology
| #13 (2020) | Stereo Crush (2025) |

Stereo Crush is the fourteenth studio album by the Swiss hard rock band Gotthard, released on 21 March 2025 through Reigning Phoenix Music. The album was co-produced by Charlie Bauerfeind and Gotthard lead guitarist Leo Leoni. The album was announced in October 2024 along with the signing to Reigning Phoenix; an accompanying concert tour that began 23 May 2025 in Bochum, Germany and ended 31 May 2025 in Telfs, Austria with support from American band Y&T was also announced. The album peaked at number one in the band's native Switzerland, making Gotthard the first Swiss act to achieve thirteen consecutive number-one albums. The album also peaked at number seven in Austria and number eleven in Germany.

== Critical reception ==
Michel van de Moosdijk of Headbanger's Lifestyle gave the album a negative review, saying "Stereo Crush lacks balls and attitude! In the old days the band always included a ballad and lots of melody in the repertoire, but the balance has shifted a bit too much and too far!", though he did praise the opening track "AI & I" as a "furious rocking track."

In a more positive review, Smudge at My Global Mind rated the album a 9/10 and concluded, "Gotthard really do give you the best of both worlds with their heavy gritty riffs, wonderful catchy melodies and rockin' rhythms. If you like rock music, you'll love this."

Jason Hopper reviewed the album for Rock Poser, saying "I will speak for all old school Gotthard fans in saying the band has officially got their groove back," and "the band has released another banger here and for the first time in a long time, I am excited about hearing new music from them."

JP of Metal Rules rated the album 4/5, criticizing the album's sequencing because the album "finishes maybe a bit weaker with a heartfelt pair of slower songs" but concluded, "If the sequencing is the only minor complaint I have, Stereo Crush is a total winner."

In another negative review, Joe Miller of Defenders of the Faith rated the album 5/10, calling the cover of "Drive My Car" "cringeworthy" and negatively comparing the song "Rusty Rose" to Alter Bridge.

== Track listing ==
Adapted from Spotify.

Stereo Crush track listing
| No. | Title | Writer(s) | Length |
|---|---|---|---|
| 1. | "AI & I" | Leo Leoni, Nic Maeder, Freddy Scherer, Danny Lee Nuccio | 2:52 |
| 2. | "Thunder & Lightning" | Scherer, Maeder | 3:37 |
| 3. | "Rusty Rose" | Leoni, Maeder, Scherer | 4:14 |
| 4. | "Burning Bridges" | Maeder | 3:37 |
| 5. | "Drive My Car" | Lennon-McCartney | 2:59 |
| 6. | "Boom Boom" | Scherer, Leoni, Maeder | 3:57 |
| 7. | "Life" | Leoni, Maeder | 3:25 |
| 8. | "Liverpool" | Leoni, Maeder, Chris von Rohr | 3:43 |
| 9. | "Shake Shake" | Leoni, Maeder | 3:49 |
| 10. | "Devil in the Moonlight" | Scherer, Leoni, Maeder | 3:11 |
| 11. | "Dig a Little Deeper" | Leoni, Maeder | 3:53 |
| 12. | "These Are the Days" | Scherer, Leoni, Maeder | 3:23 |

== Personnel ==
=== Gotthard ===
- Nic Maeder – vocals
- Leo Leoni – guitars
- Freddy Scherer – guitars
- Marc Lynn – bass
- Flavio Mezzodi – drums

=== Other personnel ===
- Charlie Bauerfeind – producer
- Sascha "Busy" Bühren – mastering
- Thomas Ewerhard – artwork

== Charts ==
Chart performance for Stereo Crush
| Chart (2025) | Peak position |
|---|---|
| Austrian Albums (Ö3 Austria) | 7 |
| German Albums (Offizielle Top 100) | 11 |
| Swiss Albums (Schweizer Hitparade) | 1 |
