= Domino Effect (Gotthard album) =

Studio album by Gotthard
- Released: 27 April 2007 (European Union); 18 September 2007 (United States)
- Recorded: Yellow House Studio 13, Lugano, Switzerland
- Genre: Hard rock
- Length: 54:39
- Label: Nuclear Blast
- Producer: Leo Leoni, Ronald Prent

Gotthard chronology
Lipservice (2005)	Domino Effect (2007)	Need To Believe (2009)

Professional ratings
Review scores
Source	Rating
AllMusic	3/5 stars

Domino Effect is the eighth studio album released by the hard rock band Gotthard.

The album peaked at #1 on the Swiss charts and was certified as Platinum for exceeding 30,000 sales.

== Track listing ==
No.	Title	Writer(s)	Length
1.	"Master of Illusion"	Leo Leoni, Steve Lee, Freddy Scherer, Danny Lee	3:55
2.	"Gone Too Far"	Leoni, Lee	3:55
3.	"Domino Effect"	Leoni, Lee, Scherer, Fredrik Thomander, Anders Wikström	3:48
4.	"Falling"	Leoni	3:35
5.	"The Call"	Scherer, Lee, Leoni	3:55
6.	"The Oscar Goes to…"	Leoni, Lee, Scherer, Thomander, Wikström	4:21
7.	"The Cruiser (Judgement Day)"	Leoni, Lee, Scherer, D. Lee	4:27
8.	"Heal Me"	Leoni, Lee	3:46
9.	"Letter to a Friend"	Leoni, Lee	3:54
10.	"Tomorrow's Just Begun"	Leoni, Lee	4:03
11.	"Come Alive"	Leoni, Lee, Thomander, Wikström	2:51
12.	"Bad to the Bone"	Leoni, Lee	3:40
13.	"Now"	Leoni, Lee, Scherer	4:11
14.	"Where Is Love When It's Gone"	Leoni, Lee, Thomander, Wikström	4:09

Bonus Track
No.	Title	Writer(s)	Length
15.	"Superman"	Leoni, Lee, D. Lee	4:08

== Domino Effect: Tour Edition ==
Disc 1
No.	Title	Length
1.	"Master of Illusion"	3:55
2.	"Gone Too Far"	3:55
3.	"Domino Effect"	3:48
4.	"Falling"	3:35
5.	"The Call"	3:55
6.	"The Oscar Goes to…"	4:21
7.	"The Cruiser (Judgement Day)"	4:27
8.	"Heal Me"	3:46
9.	"Letter to a Friend"	3:54
10.	"Tomorrow's Just Begun"	4:03
11.	"Come Alive"	2:51
12.	"Bad to the Bone"	3:40
13.	"Now"	4:11
14.	"Where Is Love When It's Gone"	4:09
15.	"Can't Be the "Real Thing"" (Leoni, Lee)	3:41

Disc 2: The Unplugged Radio Show "SWR1-Kopfhörer" - July 27, 2007
No.	Title	Length
1.	"Hurry" (Leoni, Lee, Chris von Rohr, Vic Vergeat)	4:16
2.	"Let It Be" (Leoni, Lee, von Rohr)	5:30
3.	"Come Alive" (Leoni, Lee, Thomander, Wikström)	4:19
4.	"One Life, One Soul" (Leoni, Lee, von Rohr)	4:27
5.	"Lift U Up" (Music: Lee, Leoni, Wikström, Thomander/Lyrics: Lee, Mary Susan Applegate)	4:11
6.	"Hush" (Joe South)	5:34

== Personnel ==
Gotthard

- Steve Lee – lead vocals
- Leo Leoni – guitars and backing vocals
- Freddy Scherer – guitars and backing vocals
- Marc Lynn – bass
- Hena Habegger – drums and percussion

Additional musician

- Nicolo Fragile – keyboards

Special guests

- Flavio Hochstrasser – additional backing vocals on tracks 3, 8, 11, 12, 13 and 14
- Danny Lee – additional backing vocals on tracks 8, 11, 12 and 13
- Ellen Ten Damme – additional backing vocals on tracks 3 and 11
- Anders Wikström – additional backing vocals on track 3
- Chunhe Gao – violins on track 4
- Ceck Formenti – trumpet on track 4
- Lino Rigamonti – accordion on track 14

== Charts ==
=== Weekly charts ===
Chart (2007)	Peak position
Austrian Albums (Ö3 Austria)	33
German Albums (Offizielle Top 100)	22
Swiss Albums (Schweizer Hitparade)	1
UK Independent Albums (OCC)	46

=== Year-end charts ===
Chart (2007)	Position
Swiss Albums (Schweizer Hitparade)	12

== Certifications ==
Region	Certification	Certified units/sales
Switzerland (IFPI Switzerland)	Platinum	30,000^{^}
^{^} Shipments figures based on certification alone.
