= Light of Dawn =

Studio album by Unisonic
- Released: August 1, 2014
- Recorded: HOFA Studios (Germany) and The Trakshak (Germany), 2014
- Genre: Power metal, hard rock
- Length: 54:39, with bonus track 62:49
- Label: earMUSIC
- Producer: Dennis Ward

Unisonic chronology
For the Kingdom (2014)	Light of Dawn (2014)

Professional ratings
Review scores
Source	Rating
Sea Of Tranquility	4.5/5 stars
Planetmosh	5/5 stars
Rock Hard	8/10

Light of Dawn is the second and final album by the hard rock/power metal band Unisonic. It was released on 1 August 2014, with cover art credited to Martin Häusler.

Dennis Ward stated about the album title & artwork: "The song Throne of the Dawn was originally titled Light of the Dawn but the lyrics became another concept during songwriting. However, we still felt strongly about the title and thought that it fit very well to the artwork. Every day has its dawn, a new beginning, a fresh start".

The majority of the songs were written by Dennis Ward, with further input from Michael Kiske and Mandy Meyer. A music video was filmed for the song "Exceptional".

The album entered several international music charts, scoring the highest entries on the Finnish albums chart, German albums chart, Swiss albums chart, Czech albums chart and Japanese albums chart.

== Track listing ==
No.	Title	Lyrics	Music	Length
1.	"Venite 2.0"		Günter Werno	1:30
2.	"Your Time Has Come"	Dennis Ward	Ward	5:03
3.	"Exceptional"	Ward	Ward	5:02
4.	"For the Kingdom"	Ward	Ward	4:58
5.	"Not Gonna Take Anymore"	Ward	Ward	4:26
6.	"Night of the Long Knives"	Ward	Ward	5:02
7.	"Find Shelter"	Ward	Mandy Meyer, Ward	5:04
8.	"Blood"	Michael Kiske, Sandro Giampietro	Kiske, Giampietro	4:45
9.	"When the Deed Is Done"	Ward	Ward	5:06
10.	"Throne of the Dawn"	Ward	Ward	4:50
11.	"Manhunter"	Kiske, Giampietro	Kiske, Giampietro	3:37
12.	"You and I"	Ward	Ward	5:20
13.	"Judgement Day (European bonus track)"	Ward	Meyer, Ward	4:50
14.	"Dare (Japanese bonus track)"	Kiske, Giampietro	Kiske, Giampietro	3:16
Total length:				62:49

== Personnel ==
- Michael Kiske - lead vocals
- Kai Hansen - lead & rhythm guitars, backing vocals
- Mandy Meyer - lead & rhythm guitars
- Dennis Ward - bass, backing vocals, producer, engineer, mixing
- Kosta Zafiriou - drums, percussion

Guest session musician

- Günter Werno - keyboards

== Charts ==
Chart (2014)	Peak position
Austrian Albums (Ö3 Austria)	47
Belgian Albums (Ultratop Flanders)	181
Belgian Albums (Ultratop Wallonia)	124
Czech Albums (ČNS IFPI)	22
Finnish Albums (Suomen virallinen lista)	10
German Albums (Offizielle Top 100)	13
Greek Albums (IFPI Greece)	45
Japanese Albums (Oricon)	24
Swiss Albums (Schweizer Hitparade)	20
