= Unisonic (band) =

German hard rock/power metal supergroup

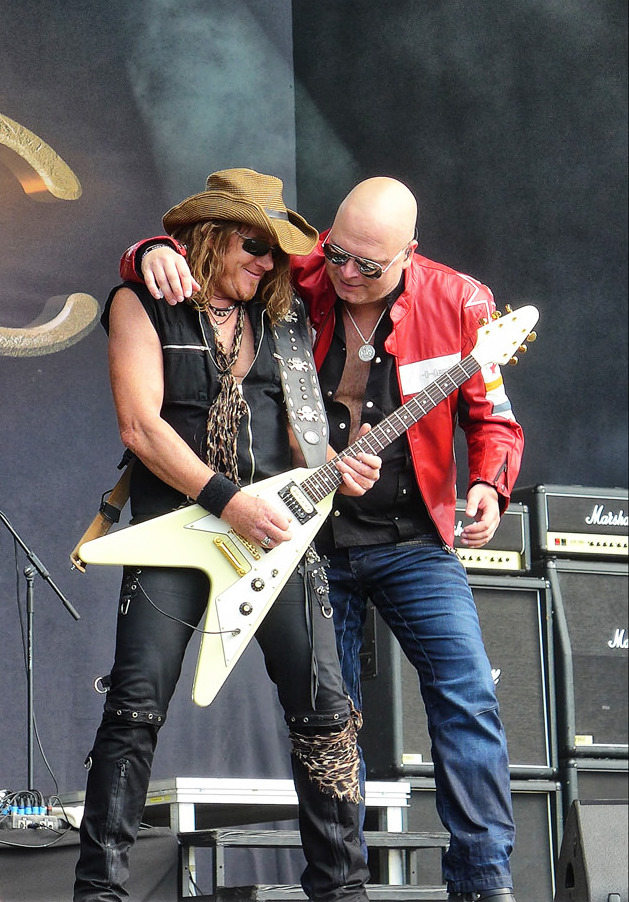
- Unisonic performing at RockFest Barcelona in 2016

Background information
- Origin: Germany
- Genres: Hard rock; power metal
- Years active: 2009–2017
- Labels: EarMusic; Edel
- Past members: Michael Kiske; Kai Hansen; Mandy Meyer; Dennis Ward; Kosta Zafiriou
- Website: www.unisonic.de

Unisonic was a German hard rock/power metal supergroup, founded on 10 November 2009 by Helloween singer Michael Kiske alongside Dennis Ward and Kosta Zafiriou from Pink Cream 69 and Mandy Meyer, formerly in Asia and Gotthard. In 2011 the band was joined by Gamma Ray leader and Helloween co-founder, Kai Hansen.

The band released the EP Ignition and their first studio album Unisonic in 2012. The EP For The Kingdom and the second album Light of Dawn came out in 2014. Both studio albums have scored high entries in several international music charts. Unisonic is the first full studio collaboration between Kiske and Hansen since Helloween's albums Keeper of the Seven Keys: Part I (1987) and Part II (1988).

== History ==
Vocalist Michael Kiske (ex-Helloween), bassist Dennis Ward (Pink Cream 69) and drummer Kosta Zafiriou (ex-Pink Cream 69) had already worked together in the AOR project Place Vendome. After the release of Place Vendome's second album, Streets of Fire in 2009, the aforementioned musicians decided to work together and form a new band. Dennis Ward suggested the recruitment of Swiss guitarist Mandy Meyer (Asia, Gotthard, Krokus). Mandy Meyer commented on the band's name: "There were so many ideas for a name and everybody liked Unisonic at the end. It fits to our band. United musicians from different backgrounds and countries". Unisonic began their first tour in June 2010, playing some warm-up shows in Germany and performing at the Sweden Rock Festival and the Masters of Rock Festival. These were the first live shows of Michael Kiske since his departure from Helloween in 1993.

Another former Helloween member, guitarist Kai Hansen (Gamma Ray), joined the band in March 2011. The new line-up performed its first show in Loud Park Festival (Japan) on 15 October 2011.

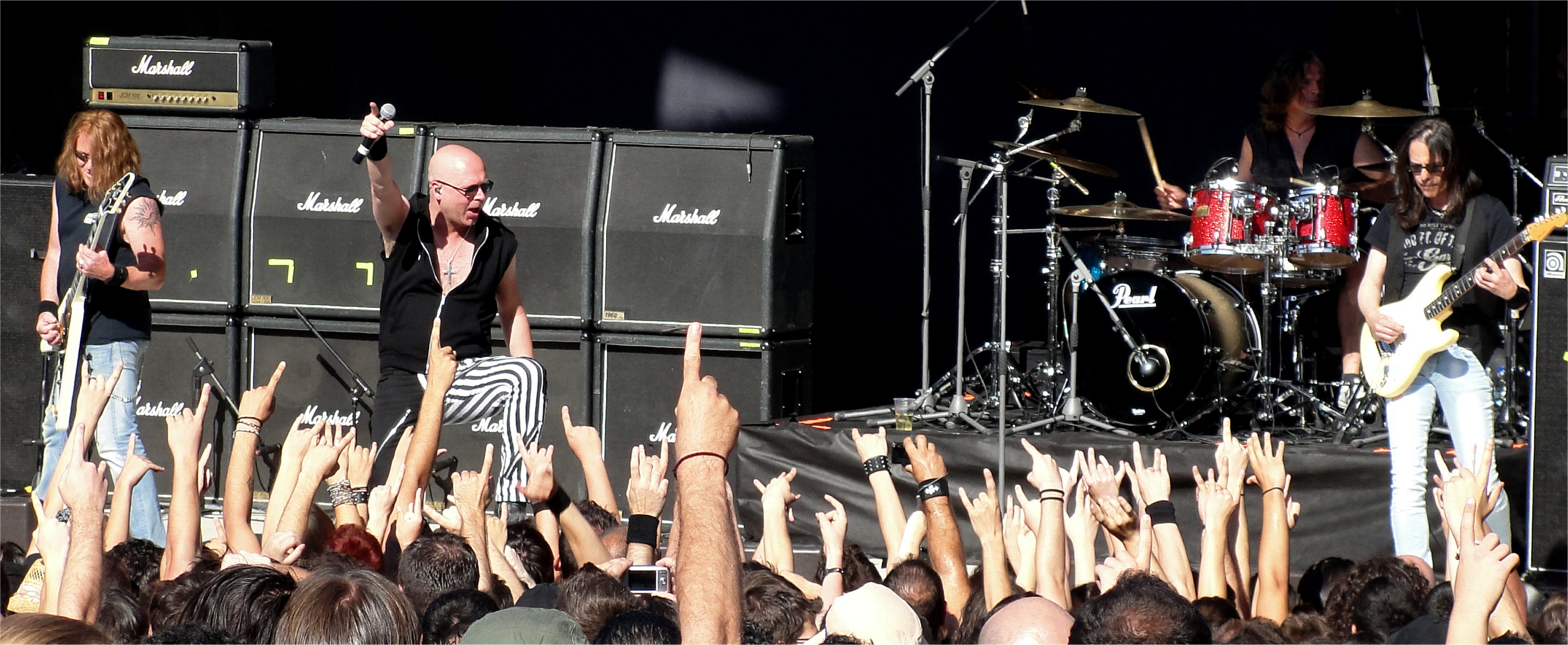
Unisonic live at the Rockwave Festival in 2012

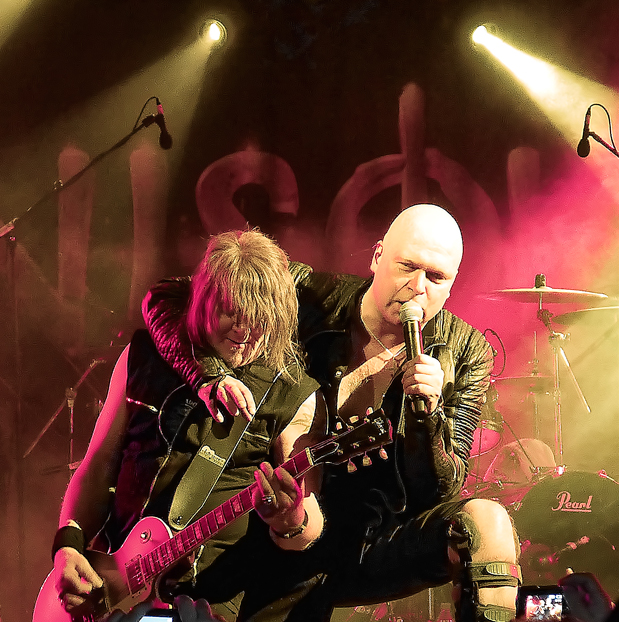
Kai Hansen (left) & Michael Kiske (right) live with Unisonic in 2014

In January 2012, the band released its first EP titled Ignition, through EarMusic (Edel AG), together with a video for the song "Unisonic". The band's self-titled debut album was released on 30 March 2012 and entered several international music charts, scoring the highest points on the Finnish albums chart, Japanese albums chart, German albums chart and Swedish albums chart.

Unisonic embarked on their first world tour in May 2012 playing in South America and in various European music festivals, such as Masters of Rock, Hellfest, Rock Hard and Gods of Metal among others. The second half of the tour included concerts in Japan, Taiwan, Korea, Russia, Spain and Germany.

The band's second EP, For the Kingdom, came out in May 2014, the video for the song "Exceptional" followed in July, while their second album, Light of Dawn, was released on 1 August 2014. Light of Dawn entered several international music charts, scoring the highest entries on the Finnish albums chart, German albums chart, Swiss albums chart, Czech albums chart and Japanese albums chart.

The band embarked on a summer festival tour in July 2014, performing at Masters Of Rock, Leyendas del Rock, Moscow Metal Meeting and Bang Your Head among others. A Japanese and European tour together with Edguy followed, while the band's final show was at the Knock Out Festival in December 2014.

On 5 August 2016 the band performed their first show at Wacken Open Air, which was recorded and released under the title Live in Wacken on 21 July 2017. On 6 September 2016 Kosta Zafiriou announced his retirement as a professional drummer, remaining only in his job as Unisonic's manager.

In an interview with Brazilian journalist Gastão Moreira, Kai Hansen said that the band is dead since 2017, when he and Michael Kiske reunited with Helloween.

== Band members ==
- Michael Kiske – lead vocals (2009–2017)
- Mandy Meyer – lead and rhythm guitars (2009–2017)
- Dennis Ward – bass, backing vocals (2009–2017)
- Kai Hansen – lead and rhythm guitars, backing vocals (2011–2017)
- Kosta Zafiriou – drums, percussion (2009–2016)

Touring members

- Michael Ehré – drums (2016)

== Discography ==
- Ignition (2012; EP)
- Unisonic (2012)
- For the Kingdom (2014; EP)
- Light of Dawn (2014)
- Live in Wacken (2017; Live Album)
