= Gotthard (album) =

Studio album by Gotthard
- Released: 9 March 1992
- Studio: Fortress Recorders, Hollywood, CA
- Genre: Hard rock
- Length: 46:11
- Label: BMG
- Producer: Chris von Rohr

Gotthard chronology
| Gotthard (1992) | Dial Hard (1994) |

Professional ratings
Review scores
| Source | Rating |
|---|---|
| Allmusic | |

Gotthard is the first studio album by the hard rock band Gotthard. It was released in 1992. The album peaked at #5 on the Swiss charts, and was certified as Platinum for exceeding 50,000 sales. The album art appears to be based on the Shroud of Turin.

The original version of "Get Down" first appeared on Chris von Rohr's 1987 solo album, Hammer & Tongue, re-issued in 1993 as The Good, the Bad and the Dog.

== Track listing ==
All songs written by Steve Lee/Leo Leoni except where noted.

1. "Standing In the Light" – 3:54
2. "Downtown" – 3:06
3. "Firedance" – 6:12 (Steve Lee/Leo Leoni/Chris von Rohr)
4. "Hush" – 4:04 (Joe South)
5. "Mean Street Rocket" – 3:53 (Steve Lee/Leo Leoni/Chris von Rohr)
6. "Get Down" – 3:22 (Chris von Rohr/Many Maurer)
7. "Take Me" – 3:43
8. "Angel" – 5:31
9. "Lonely Heartache" – 3:45
10. "Hunter" – 4:15
11. "All I Care For" – 3:10
12. ""That's It"" (Instrumental) – 1:16 (Leo Leoni/Hena Habegger)

== Personnel ==
- Steve Lee – vocals
- Leo Leoni – guitars and vocals
- Marc Lynn – bass guitar
- Hena Habegger – drums

Guests:

- Vivian Campbell – lead guitar (tracks 3 & 6)
- Pat Regan – keyboards
- Neil Otupacca – keyboards

== Production ==
- Mixing – Pat Regan
- Assistant Mixing – Chris von Rohr and Peavy Tanner

== Charts ==
=== Weekly charts ===
| Chart (1992) | Peak position |
|---|---|
| Swiss Albums (Schweizer Hitparade) | 5 |

=== Year-end charts ===
| Chart (1992) | Position |
|---|---|
| Swiss Albums (Schweizer Hitparade) | 8 |

== Certifications ==
| Region | Certification | Certified units/sales |
|---|---|---|
| Switzerland (IFPI Switzerland) | Platinum | 50,000^{^} |
^{^} Shipments figures based on certification alone.
