= G. (album) =

Studio album by Gotthard
- Released: 1996
- Genre: Hard rock
- Length: 52:05 (55:21)
- Label: BMG
- Producer: Chris von Rohr

Gotthard chronology
Dial Hard (1994)	G. (1996)	Open (1999)

Professional ratings
Review scores
Source	Rating
Allmusic	link

G. is the third studio album released by the hard rock band Gotthard. The album peaked at #1 on the Swiss charts and was certified as Platinum for exceeding 30,000 sales.

The original version of "Sweet Little Rock 'n' Roller" first appeared as "Sweet Little R'R'" on Chris von Rohr's 1987 solo album, Hammer & Tongue, re-issued in 1993 as The Good, The Bad and The Dog.

== Track listing ==
All songs written by Steve Lee/Leo Leoni/Chris von Rohr except where noted.

1. "Sister Moon" – 3:55
2. "Make My Day" – 3:45
3. "Mighty Quinn" – 3:15 (Bob Dylan)
4. "Movin' On" – 3:23
5. "Let It Be" – 6:17
6. "Father Is That Enough?" – 4:01
7. "Sweet Little Rock 'n' Roller" – 3:19 (Chris von Rohr / Maurer)
8. "Fist In Your Face" – 3:50
9. "Ride On" – 4:08
10. "In the Name" – 5:25
11. "Lay Down the Law" – 3:37
12. "Hole In One" – 3:11
13. "One Life, One Soul" – 3:59

Asian version (BMG BVCM-35016) adds the following:

14. "Immigrant Song" – 3:16 (Jimmy Page / Robert Plant)

BMG Ariola 1996 (74321 43036 2) adds the following:

15. "He Ain't Heavy, He's My Brother" – 4:38 (Bobby Scott / Bob Russell)

== Personnel ==
- Steve Lee – Vocals
- Leo Leoni – Guitar and Vocals
- Marc Lynn – Bass guitar
- Hena Habegger – Drums

Guests:

- Cat Gray – Keyboards and Percussion
- Sammy Sanchez – Slide Guitar
- Andrew Garver – Harmonica
- Jane Child – Backing Vocals

== Production ==
- Mixing – Paul Lani, Chris von Rohr and Leo Leoni

== Charts ==
=== Weekly charts ===
Chart (1996)	Peak position
German Albums (Offizielle Top 100)	49
Swiss Albums (Schweizer Hitparade)	1

=== Year-end charts ===
Chart (1996)	Position
Swiss Albums (Schweizer Hitparade)	12

== Certifications ==
Region	Certification	Certified units/sales
Switzerland (IFPI Switzerland)	Platinum	50,000^{^}
^{^} Shipments figures based on certification alone.
