= Martin Häusler =

German photographer, music video director and art director

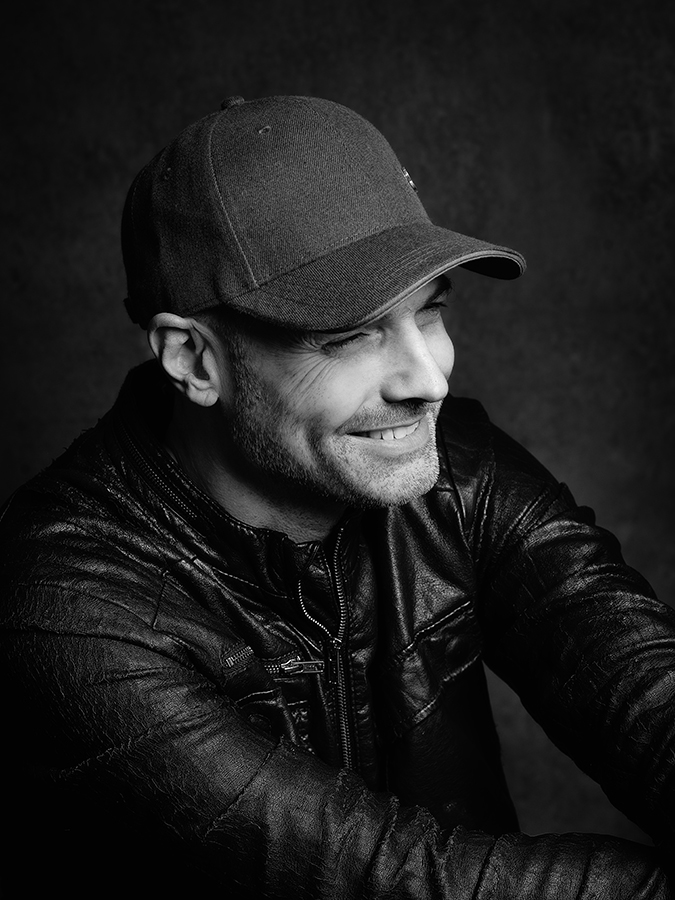
- Häusler in 2016
- Born: January 24, 1971 (age 55); Heidelberg, Germany
- Known for: Photography, music video direction, art direction
- Website: martinhausler.com

Martin Häusler (born January 24, 1971, in Heidelberg, Germany) is a German portrait photographer, music video director and art director. In the United States, and other English speaking countries, he uses the adjusted spelling of his name Martin Hausler for his published works.

== Career ==
Häusler began his creative career in the 1990s as a designer and art director, producing books and calendars for international music acts including the Rolling Stones., Backstreet Boys, and NSYNC.

From 2000, Häusler extended his creative spectrum and began working as a director of music videos for artists including Tito & Tarantula, Helloween, Krokus, Gotthard and Sweetbox. He also made music documentaries for the US actress and pop singer Hilary Duff, working closely with her in the following years and designing the artwork for several of her CD covers

Häusler expanded his creative outlets again in 2004, making his mark as a photographer and becoming known for his charismatic portraits, with photo shoots featuring rock legends including Meat Loaf, as the photographer on his 2010 album Hang Cool Teddy Bear , Brian May of Queen and Lemmy Kilmister of Motörhead. Other notable shoots have been with Britney Spears, Jessica Sutta of the Pussycat Dolls, Bon Jovi, Queen + Paul Rodgers, Nikka Costa, Alex (Max) Band, Eva Simons, R5, Hollywood actors Terry Crews and Danny Trejo and Slayer.

Häusler's portrait photography has also seen him featured on the cover of both Pro Photo West and Photo Professional magazines respectively, as a featured speaker at Photokina in September 2014 and September 2016 and as a guest on various television shows in his native Germany.

Häusler has also garnered a positive reputation internationally for his developments in the area of 3D photography. In June 2011, Häusler worked with Grazia magazine and presented a 3D exhibition at the opening of the Berlin Fashion Week with a process he developed utilising a 3D Light-field camera system, where models photographed in 3D could subsequently be viewed lifesize without 3D glasses. He has lectured with Adobe Systems Inc. for their developers at the Pasadena Art Center College of Design and has featured in publications including Page and Photographie. Adobe displayed his 3D work at their 2011 'Photoshop And You' event in San Francisco.

In Spring 2014, Häusler held his first solo photography exhibition, in his hometown of Heidelberg, Germany. It showcased a mixture of his previous photographic work plus portraits of German artists, Eurovision Song Contest winner Mr Lordi and Brian May of Queen. At the opening night of the exhibition, Häusler was joined by Bobby Kimball, six-time Grammy winner and lead singer of the band Toto, amongst others.

In December 2014, the Substrate Fine Art Gallery in Los Angeles staged the exhibition L.A. ICONIC'S, which showcased Häusler's photographs with predominantly US artists from recent years. Entertainers including Terry Crews, Meat Loaf, R5, Motörhead and Jessica Sutta supported Häusler in this project.

In September and October 2016 Häusler did showcase his music photography in London at the Sanctum Soho Hotel at his exhibition titled "The Martin Häusler Sanctum Soho Photography Takeover".

In May 2018 Häusler presented the exhibition project Cuban Beauty and did published a coffee table photography book with the same title. The series of photographs is the first exhibition project where Häusler is not showcasing celebrities but decided to present young and emerging models from the island of Cuba with his edgy style of photography, photographed on various locations in Cuba.

Häusler appeared in multiple episodes of the OWN TV show Livin' Lozada, which first aired in the United States in July 2015. He featured as the photographer on photoshoots for both Evelyn Lozada and her daughter Shaniece Hairston, which took place in Los Angeles.

Additional to his work as a still photographer Häusler is also taking video and creative direction roles for various entertainment projects. In spring 2017 he did create the show visuals for the "Crazy World Tour" of the rockband Scorpions and directed the show visuals and videoclips for several other arena shows such as for the "Peter Maffay MTV Unplugged Tour 2018" in Germany of Peter Maffay and the „Live 2019/2020" and "2022 Udopium Live Tour" by Udo Lindenberg.

== Exhibitions ==
- 2011 – Berlin: 3D Lifesize Photography, Berlin Fashion Week
- 2011 – San Francisco: 3D-Works, Photoshop And You
- 2014 – Heidelberg: Martin Häusler Fotografien, Alte Weinfabrik
- 2014 – Los Angeles: L.A. ICONIC'S, Substrate Fine Art Gallery
- 2015 – Stuttgart: I'M A ROCKER, Rock Star Photo Gallery
- 2016 – London: The Martin Häusler Sanctum Soho Photography Takeover
- 2018 - Heidelberg: CUBAN BEAUTY, Altes Hallenbad, Heidelberg

== Photography books ==
- 2018 - Cuban Beauty, ISBN 9783000592607, Listed in the German National Library
