= Gotthard (band) =

Swiss hard rock band

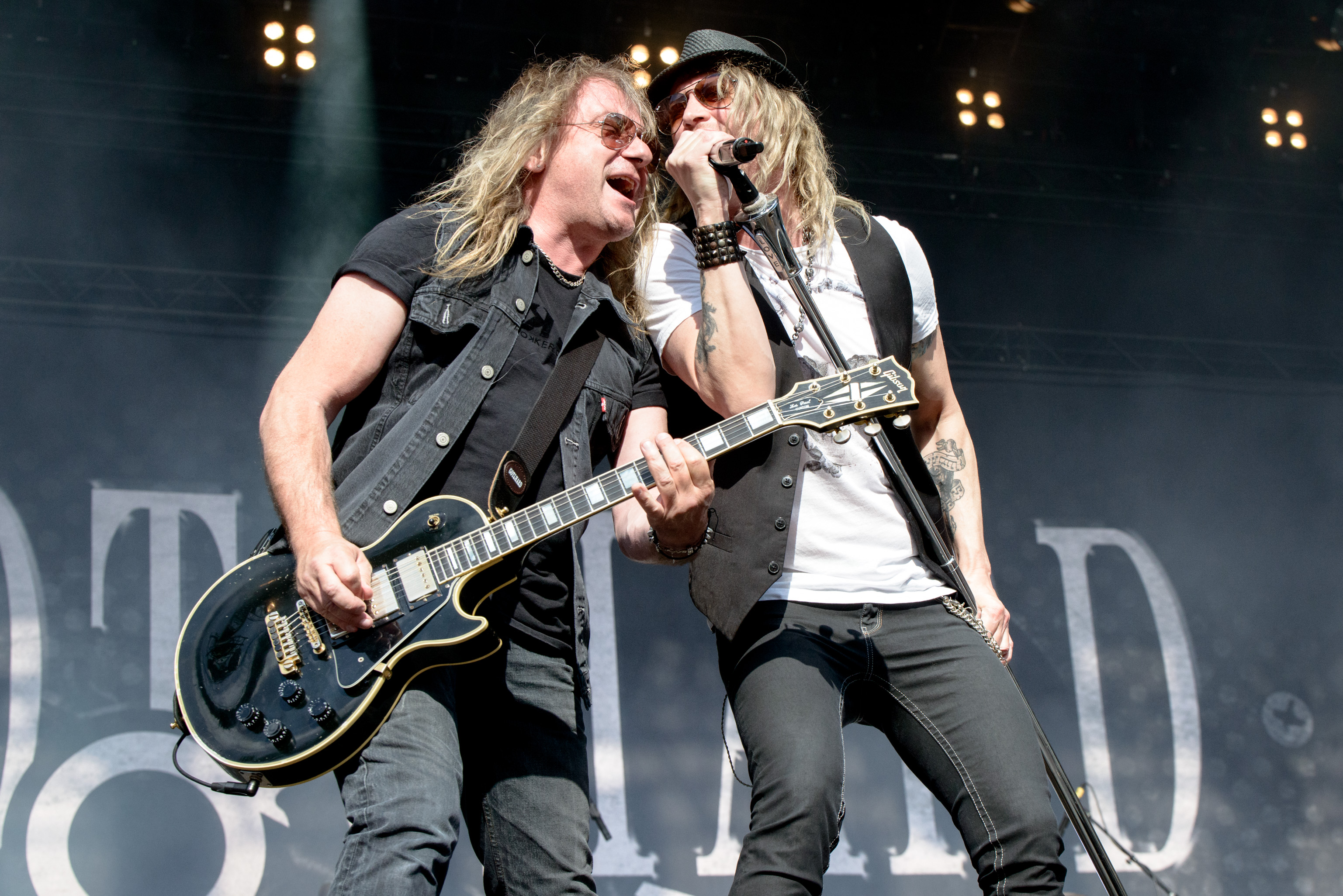
- Gotthard performing in 2016

Background information
- Origin: Lugano, Ticino, Switzerland
- Genres: Hard rock
- Years active: 1991–present
- Labels: BMG, Nuclear Blast
- Members: Leo Leoni; Marc Lynn; Freddy Scherer; Nic Maeder; Flavio Mezzodi
- Past members: Steve Lee; Mandy Meyer; Hena Habegger
- Website: gotthard.com

Gotthard is a Swiss hard rock band founded in Lugano by Steve Lee and Leo Leoni. Their last sixteen albums have all reached number one in the Swiss album charts, making them one of the most successful Swiss acts ever. With over three million albums sold, they have received multi-platinum awards across the world. The band takes its name from the Saint-Gotthard Massif.

Singer Steve Lee died in a motorcycle accident on 5 October 2010. In November 2011, Gotthard announced a new singer, Nic Maeder, through their official Facebook page and their website with a new song, "Remember It's Me", downloadable for free.

== Influences ==
Influences include Led Zeppelin, AC/DC, Whitesnake, Deep Purple, Bon Jovi, Van Halen and Aerosmith. Singer Steve Lee was especially fond of Whitesnake.

Gotthard also performed "Immigrant Song" (originally by Led Zeppelin) live and it featured exclusively on a CD by Classic Rock (a long running monthly UK rock magazine). "Hush" was also performed live and can be found on the Made In Switzerland and "D frosted" albums.

They have also covered songs from Bob Dylan, The Hollies, Manfred Mann, ABBA, and The Move.

In 2008, Gotthard was supporting act for one of their favourite bands Deep Purple, during Deep Purple's German Tour. They also played at the Magic Circle Music Festival alongside bands such as Manowar, Alice Cooper, Doro and W.A.S.P. in Bad Arolsen, Germany.

Gotthard also opened up for US rock band Bon Jovi in Switzerland, Germany and Italy, and for Canadian rock star Bryan Adams.

After forging a friendship during a Rock Meets Classic tour, Francis Rossi of Status Quo has collaborated with Gotthard by co-writing and featuring on multiple tracks: first, on the 2018 single "Bye Bye Caroline" from the album Defrosted 2 and then on the track "Missteria" from the 2020 album #13. "Bye Bye Caroline" was inspired by Status Quo's song "Caroline" from 1973.

== Members ==
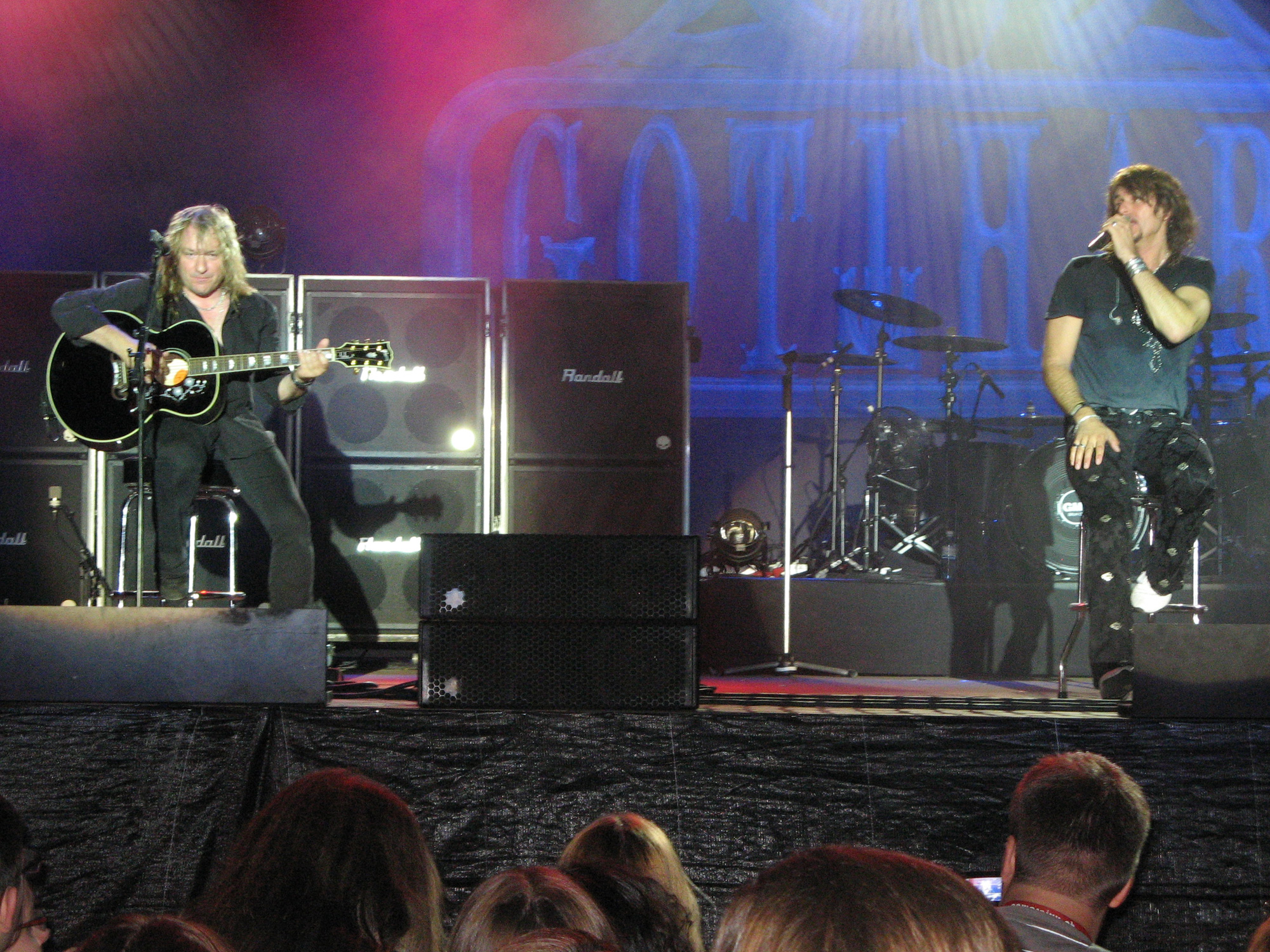
Gotthard performing in 2010

Current members

- Leo Leoni – guitars, backing vocals (1991–present)
- Marc Lynn – bass, backing vocals (1991–present)
- Freddy Scherer – guitars, backing vocals (2004–present)
- Nic Maeder – lead vocals (2010–present)
- Flavio Mezzodi – drums (2021–present)

Past members

- Steve Lee – lead vocals (1991–2010; his death)
- Hena Habegger – drums (1991–2021)
- Mandy Meyer – guitars, backing vocals (1996–2004)

Timeline

== Discography ==
=== Studio albums ===
- Gotthard (1992)
- Dial Hard (1994)
- G. (1996)
- Open (1999)
- Homerun (2001)
- Human Zoo (2003)
- Lipservice (2005)
- Domino Effect (2007)
- Need to Believe (2009)
- Firebirth (2012)
- Bang! (2014)
- Silver (2017)
- #13 (2020)
- Stereo Crush (2025)

=== Live albums ===
- The Hamburg Tapes (1996)
- D Frosted (1997)
- Made in Switzerland – Live in Zürich (2006)
- Homegrown – Alive in Lugano (2011)
- Live & Bangin' (official bootleg; 2015)
- Defrosted 2 (2018)

=== Compilation albums ===
- One Life One Soul – Best of Ballads (2002)
- One Team One Spirit – The Very Best (2004)
- Heaven: Best of Ballads – Part 2 (2010)
- Steve Lee – The Eyes of a Tiger: In Memory of Our Unforgotten Friend (2020)
