= Steve Lee (singer) =

Swiss Musical artist (1963–2010)

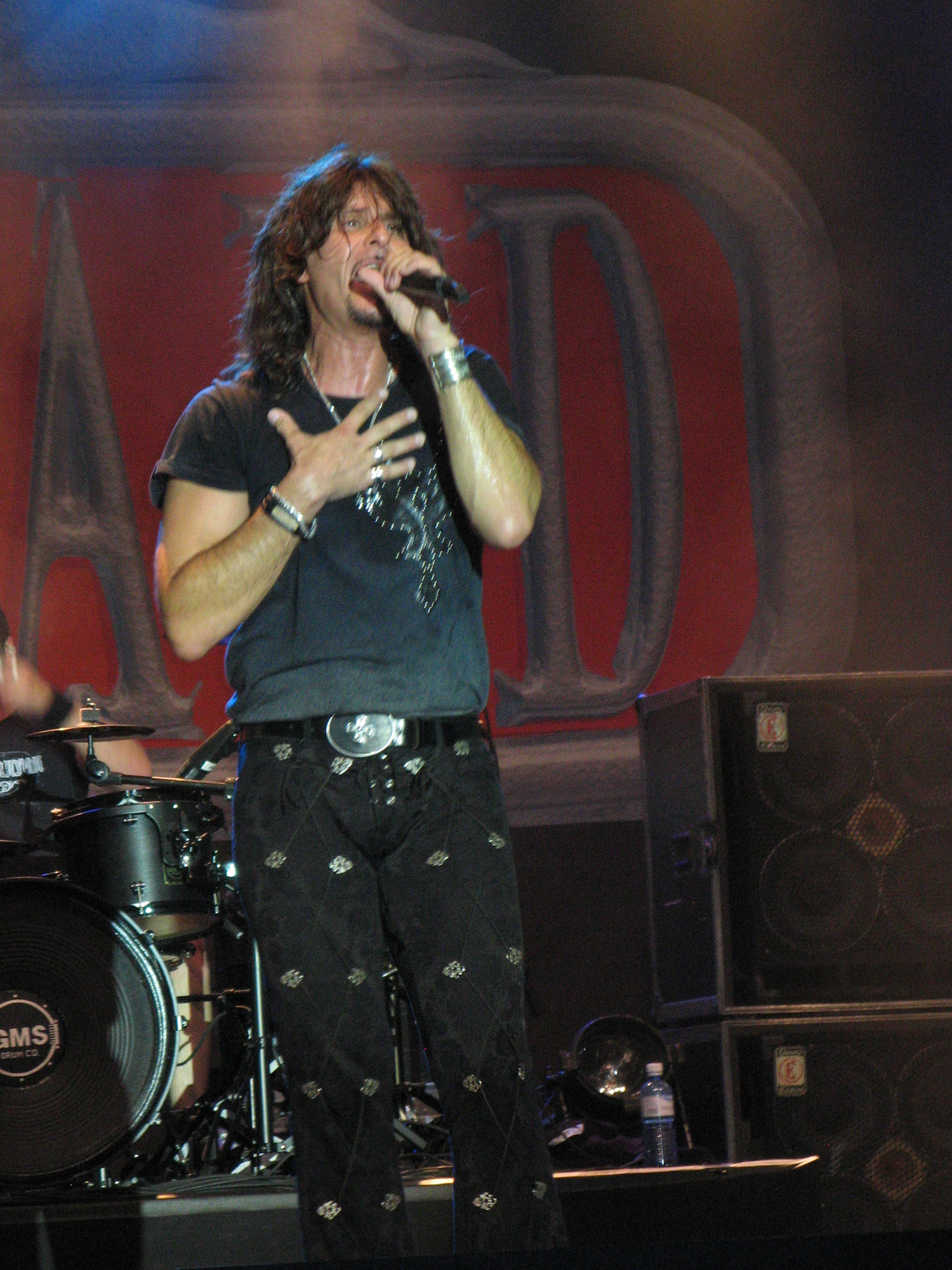
- Steve Lee in concert, 2010

Background information
- Born: Stefan Alois; 5 August 1963; Zurich, Switzerland
- Died: 5 October 2010 (aged 47) Mesquite, Nevada, United States
- Genres: Hard rock
- Occupations: Musician, singer-songwriter, drummer, harmonica
- Years active: 1988–2010
- Formerly of: Gotthard, Ayreon

Steve Lee (born Stefan Alois in Horgen, Switzerland, 5 August 1963 – 5 October 2010) was a Swiss musician, best known as the vocalist of the band Gotthard.

== Biography ==
In 1979, Lee's first public concert took place at the Aula Magna of Lugano-Trevano, under the name Cromo, with Lee on vocals and drums; Gerard Garganigo on keyboards and vocals; Tiziano Lippmann on keyboards, synthesizers, and sequencers; Massimo Basso on bass and vocals; and Guido Gagliano on guitar and vocals.

In 1988, Lee joined the group Forsale.

In 1992, in Lugano, along with guitarist Leo Leoni, bassist Marc Lynn, and drummer Hena Habegger, Lee founded the band Krak. Under the lead of bassist and founding member of Krokus, Chris von Rohr, the band changed its name to Gotthard, a name inspired by the Gotthard Pass.

In 2007, Lee was contacted by Arjen Anthony Lucassen to feature on Ayreon's 2008 album 01011001. He sang vocals, alongside other progressive rock and progressive metal singers.

He spoke fluent Italian, German, English, and French.

Steve Lee was killed in a motorcycle accident 10 miles (16 km) south of Mesquite, Nevada on Interstate 15 when a semi truck hit a parked motorcycle that subsequently struck and killed Lee. The Swiss band Blue Cold Ice Creams dedicated the song Moon of Midnight to him.

== Influences ==
Lee's musical influences included Led Zeppelin, AC/DC, Whitesnake, Deep Purple, Bon Jovi, Van Halen and Aerosmith. Lee was especially fond of Whitesnake and based his singing style on that of their lead singer David Coverdale.
