= List of Venom band members =

Vemon band members

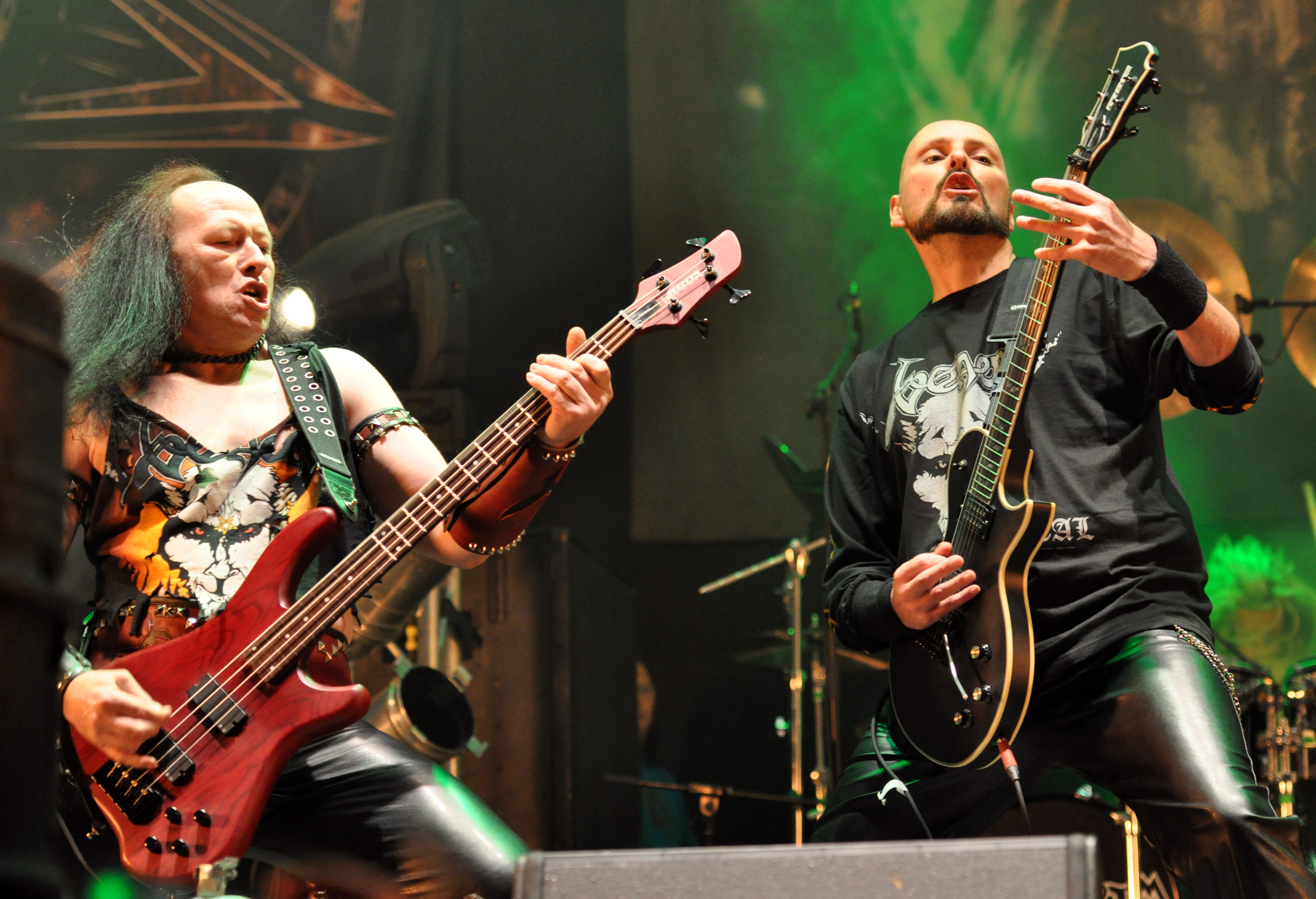
Conrad Lant and Stuart Dixon performing with Venom in 2013

Venom were an English heavy metal band from Newcastle upon Tyne. Formed in September 1978, the group originally featured drummer Anthony Bray, rhythm guitarist Conrad Lant, lead guitarist Jeffrey Dunn, lead singer Clive Archer and bassist Alan Winston.

The band, in its final formation, consisted of Lant (on bass/lead vocals from 1980 until his death in 2026, who was absent between 1988 and 1995), guitarist Stuart "Rage" Dixon (from 2007-2026) and drummer Danny "Dante" Needham (from 2009-2026).

== History ==
The original Venom personnel came from three different bands: Guillotine, Oberon and Dwarfstar. The original Guillotine featured Jeff "Mantas" Dunn and Dave Rutherford on guitars, Dean Hewitt on bass, Dave Blackman on vocals, and Chris Mercater on drums who replaced Paul Burke, the original drummer when the band was founded. Blackman and Mercater were later also replaced by drummer Anthony Bray and vocalist Clive Archer. Hewitt was then replaced by Alan Winston on bass, and Rutherford was replaced by Conrad "Cronos" Lant on guitar.

In late 1978, bassist Winston left and Lant switched to bass. Each band member soon adopted a stage name for use in Venom – Bray as "Abaddon", Lant as "Cronos", Dunn as "Mantas" and Archer as "Christus". Archer was credited as "Jesus Christ" on the band's first demo tape Demon, released in 1980. Shortly after the demo's release, the decision was made to dismiss the vocalist and continue Venom as a three-piece, as Cronos had begun taking over the role. The band's lineup remained stable for the release of four studio albums between 1981 and 1985, before Mantas left in 1986.

For 1987's Calm Before the Storm, Abaddon and Cronos brought in guitarists Mike Hickey and Jim Clare. The following year, however, the frontman decided to leave Venom and form his own eponymous band, with both new members joining him in the group's initial lineup. Cronos was replaced by former Atomkraft frontman Tony "Demolition Man" Dolan early the following year, as Mantas returned and Al Barnes was added on rhythm guitar and bass. After the release of Prime Evil, Tear Your Soul Apart and Temples of Ice, Barnes left Venom; he was replaced by Steve "War Maniac" White, who joined alongside keyboardist Dave "VXS" Young for 1992's The Waste Lands. Dolan, Mantas and Abaddon continued performing as a trio, before Cronos returned in time for a headlining show at Holland's Waldrock Festival on 24 June 1995.

Abaddon, the only remaining constant member of Venom, left the group in 1999 and was replaced by Cronos' brother Anthony "Antton" Lant. In February 2002, Venom was put on hiatus after Cronos was injured in a climbing accident. The group returned in 2004, with Hickey (now under the name "Mykvs") returning to replace the departed Mantas. Mykvs was later replaced by Stuart "La Rage" Dixon in early 2007. Antton then left to focus on his other band Def-Con-One in 2009, with Danny "Dante" Needham taking his place a month later. This line-up remained until Cronos' death in 2026, after which the band broke up.

== Members ==
=== Former ===
Image	Name	Years active	Instruments	Release contributions
	Jeffrey "Mantas" Dunn	1978–1986; 1989–2002	guitar; backing vocals (since 1980)	all Venom releases from Demon demo (1980) to Resurrection (2000), except Calm Before the Storm (1987)
	Dave Rutherford	1978–1979	guitar	none
	Dave Blackman	1978–1979	lead vocals	none
	Dean Hewitt	1978–1979	bass	none
	Chris McPeters	1978–1979	drums	none
	Conrad "Cronos" Lant	1979–1988; 1995–2026 (his death)	guitar (1979–1980); bass (since February 1980); lead vocals (since mid-1980)	all Venom releases from Demon demo (1980) to Calm Before the Storm (1987), and from Venom '96 (1996) onwards
	Anthony "Abaddon" Bray	1979–1999	drums; backing vocals (since 1980); occasional keyboards	all Venom releases from Demon demo (1980) to Cast in Stone (1997)
	Clive "Jesus Christ" Archer	1979–1980	lead vocals	Demon demo (1980)
	Alan Winston	1979–1980	bass	none
	Mike "Mykvs" Hickey	1986–1988; 2004–2007	guitar; backing vocals	Calm Before the Storm (1987); Metal Black (2006)
	Jim Clare	1986–1988	guitar; keyboards; backing vocals	Calm Before the Storm (1987)
	Tony "Demolition Man" Dolan	1989–1995	bass; lead vocals	Prime Evil (1989); Tear Your Soul Apart (1990); Temples of Ice (1991); The Waste Lands (1992)
	Al Barnes	1989–1991	guitar; occasional bass	Prime Evil (1989); Tear Your Soul Apart (1990); Temples of Ice (1991)
	Steve "War Maniac" White	1991–1992	guitar	The Waste Lands (1992)
	Trevor "VSX" Sewell	1991–1992	keyboards	The Waste Lands (1992)
	Anthony "Antton" Lant	1999–2009	drums; backing vocals; occasional guitar	Resurrection (2000); Metal Black (2006); Hell (2008)
	Stuart "LaRage" Dixon	2007–2026	guitar; backing vocals	all releases from Hell (2008) onwards
	Danny "Dante" Needham	2009–2026	drums; percussion; backing vocals	all releases from Fallen Angels (2011) onwards

== Timeline ==
Guillotine/Venom

Album Graecum/Dwarf Star/Oberon

== Lineups ==
Period	Members	Releases
September 1978 – July 1979	Dave Blackman – lead vocals; Jeffrey Dunn – lead guitar; Dave Rutherford – rhythm guitar; Dean Hewitt – bass; Chris McPeters – drums	none
August – November 1979	Clive Archer – lead vocals; Jeffrey Dunn – lead guitar; Dave Rutherford – rhythm guitar; Alan Winston – bass; Tony Bray – drums	none
November 1979 – February 1980	Clive Archer – lead vocals; Jeffrey Dunn – lead guitar; Conrad Lant – rhythm guitar; Alan Winston — bass; Tony Bray – drums	none
February – mid-1980	Clive "Jesus Christ" Archer – lead vocals; Jeffrey "Mantas" Dunn – guitar, backing vocals; Conrad "Cronos" Lant – bass, backing vocals; Anthony "Abaddon" Bray – drums, backing vocals	Demon demo (1980)
Mid-1980–August 1986	Mantas – guitar, backing vocals; Cronos – bass, lead vocals; Abaddon – drums, backing vocals	Welcome to Hell (1981); Black Metal (1982); At War with Satan (1984); Hell at Hammersmith (1985); Possessed (1985); Eine kleine Nachtmusik (1986)
September 1986 – November 1988	Mike "Mykvs" Hickey – lead guitar, backing vocals; Jim Clare – rhythm guitar, keyboards, backing vocals; Cronos – bass, lead vocals; Abaddon – drums, backing vocals	Calm Before the Storm (1987)
January 1989 – 1991	Mantas – lead guitar, backing vocals; Al Barnes – rhythm guitar, occasional bass; Tony "Demolition Man" Dolan – bass, lead vocals; Abaddon – drums, backing vocals	Prime Evil (1989); ...Tear Your Soul Apart (1990); Temples of Ice (1991)
1991 – November 1992	Mantas – lead guitar, backing vocals; Steve White – rhythm guitar; Demolition Man – bass, lead vocals; Trevor "VSX" Sewell – keyboards; Abaddon – drums, backing vocals	The Waste Lands (1992)
December 1992 – 1995	Mantas – guitar, backing vocals; Demolition Man – bass, lead vocals; Abaddon – drums, backing vocals	none
1995 – 1999	Mantas – guitar, backing vocals; Cronos – bass, lead vocals; Abaddon – drums, backing vocals	Venom '96 (1996); Cast in Stone (1997); The Second Coming (1997)
1999 – February 2002	Mantas – guitar, backing vocals; Cronos – bass, lead vocals; Anthony "Antton" Lant – drums, backing vocals	Resurrection (2000)
Band on hiatus February 2002 – March 2004
March 2004 – January 2007	Mike "Mykvs" Hickey – guitar, backing vocals; Cronos – bass, lead vocals; Antton – drums, backing vocals	Metal Black (2006)
January 2007 – April 2009	Stuart "La Rage" Dixon – guitar, backing vocals; Cronos – bass, lead vocals; Antton – drums, backing vocals	Hell (2008)
May 2009 – September 2026	La Rage – guitar, backing vocals; Cronos – bass, lead vocals; Danny "Dante" Needham – drums, backing vocals	Fallen Angels (2011); From the Very Depths (2015); 100 Miles to Hell (2017); Storm the Gates (2018); Into Oblivion (2026)
