= Countess Bathory (song) =

1982 song by Venom

Song by Venom

from the album Black Metal
- Recorded: 1982
- Genre: Heavy metal; speed metal; thrash metal; black metal
- Length: 3:44
- Label: Neat (UK); Combat (USA)
- Songwriter(s): Conrad "Cronos" Lant; Jeffrey "Mantas" Dunn; Tony "Abaddon" Bray
- Producer(s): Keith Nichol and Venom

"Countess Bathory" is a song by English heavy metal band Venom. The song originally appeared on the band's 1982 album Black Metal as well as their 1986 live album Eine kleine Nachtmusik.

== Writing and recording ==
"Countess Bathory", like all songs on the album were written by vocalist and bassist Conrad "Cronos" Lant and guitarist Jeffrey "Mantas" Dunn. It was written when band drummer Tony "Abaddon" Bray was late for a session, so Dunn began jamming some new riffs while Lant would work the lyrics out. The band's roadie came in the room and began drumming for them, and soon after "Abaddon" would come in and tried to make up a new drum pattern, but Lant and Dunn felt the roadie's drum pattern worked best.

"One day Abaddon was late for the sessions, so Jeff and I started trying out new laps and working on a text. One of our roadies, Ged Cook, who was the manager's brother, walked in and hit the drums. We started fooling around and so Countess Bathory was born." — Lant

Lant also explained the origin of the song's opening riff, saying that it was inspired by the opening theme song of the children's show The Magic Roundabout. The songs riff also bears resemblance to the intro of the 1991 Nirvana hit song "Smells Like Teen Spirit". Years later, Lant had the opportunity to ask Nirvana drummer Dave Grohl, whom he collaborated with on Grohl's heavy metal side project Probot, if they had taken inspiration from the band's 1982 song. Grohl did not give Lant a response. The song, along with the entire album was recorded in just 7 days, with Lant working long hours recording alongside the studio engineer and then mixing the tracks on his own.

== Music and lyrics ==
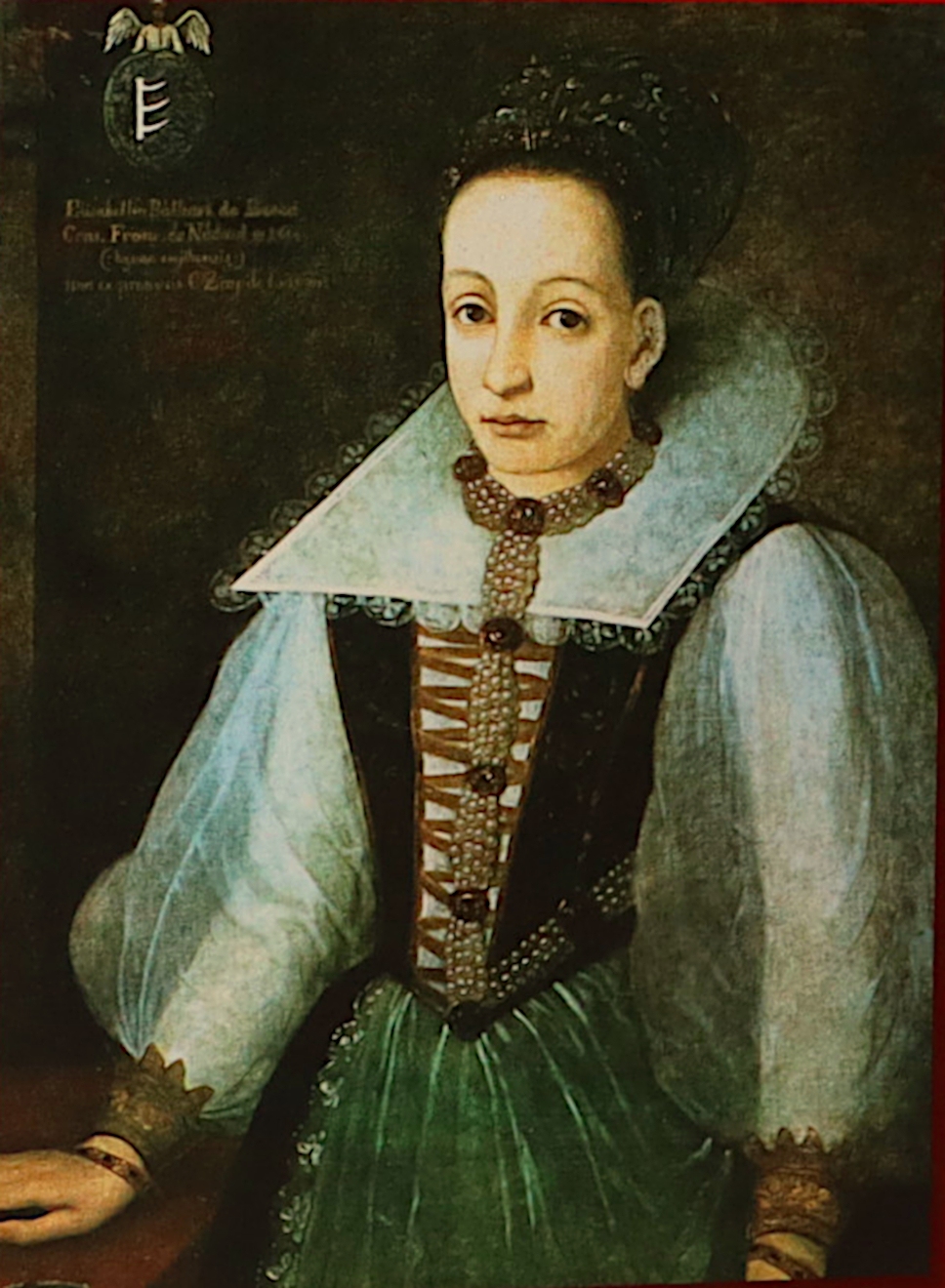
Elizabeth Báthory from Zay artist. Probably a copy of the other painting which is at the Hungarian National Museum in Budapest (also made by Zay). Mentioned in the Magyar Várak book, page 34.

Like other tracks on Black Metal, it is described as "speed, catchy speed, rhythmic explosions and cutting riffs". The song tells of the ominous deeds and crimes of the Hungarian noblewoman Countess Elizabeth Báthory, the most prolific female murderer. Elizabeth Bathory tortured and killed hundreds of young girls and women between 1590 and 1610. Stories began circulating of her vampiric tendencies including tales of her bathing in the blood of the virgin girls and women she murdered to retain her youth. The final verse of the song describes Elizabeth at the end of her life and that there is "no blood to turn time back" as she is "crippled now with age". The Grim Reaper comes to collect her soul as she "welcomes death with open arms", the Reaper then "turns the page".

== Reception ==
Regarded by critics and fans alike as one of Venom's best songs, it has since become a staple at Venom shows. AllMusic reviewer Eduardo Rivadavia referred to the song along with another track, "Bloodlust", as "absolute classics".

== Legacy and influence ==
The song has been covered by numerous artists including Blitzkrieg, Macabre, Isegrim, Kazjurol, Messiah Marcolin, Necrodeath and Unleashed. Drummer Jonas Åkerlund, of Swedish extreme metal band Bathory, cites the track "Countess Bathory" as the inspiration for the band's name.

== Credits ==
- Venom – producer, performers
  - Conrad "Cronos" Lant – bass, vocals
  - Jeffrey "Mantas" Dunn – guitars
  - Tony "Abaddon" Bray – drums
- Keith Nichol – producer, engineer
