= In League with Satan =

1981 single by Venom

Single by Venom

from the album Welcome to Hell
- Released: 17 April 1981
- Recorded: January 1981 (single); 10 October 1980 (demo)
- Studio: Impulse Studios in Newcastle, England
- Genre: Heavy metal; speed metal; thrash metal; black metal
- Length: 3:31
- Label: Neat (UK)
- Songwriters: Conrad "Cronos" Lant; Jeffrey "Mantas" Dunn; Tony "Abaddon" Bray
- Producers: Steve Thompson and Venom

Venom singles chronology
"In League with Satan" (1981)	"Bloodlust" (1982)

"In League with Satan" is the first song released by the English extreme metal band Venom. It was released on 17 April 1981 as a single with the B-side "Live Like an Angel" by Neat Records and later appeared on the band's first album, Welcome to Hell. The song has been cited as the first black metal song and is also often cited by critics who claim a connection between heavy metal and Satanism.

== Writing and recording ==
According to vocalist and bassist Conrad "Cronos" Lant, "In League with Satan" is one of the earliest songs the band wrote. In April 1980, the band recorded a three track demo tape called Demon after Lant managed to convince Impulse Studios engineer Mickey Sweeney to work a short recording session with the band and get half a day in the studio for free. The tape featured three tracks: "Angel Dust", "Raise The Dead" and "Red Light Fever", and would eventually land on the desk of Geoff Barton, who was the editor of Sounds. Barton, bewildered and impressed with the band's demo, would put all three tracks on his weekly play list. Barton ended a review of White Spirit's 1980 debut album by recommending Neat Records release a Venom single.

Venom would return to the studio in October 1980 and began recording yet another demo tape after Neat came up with an affordable deal called the "£50 Demos". This deal allowed the band 4 hours in the studio to record as many live songs as possible straight to a 2-track master for £50. However, Lant was unable to get the money, so he agreed to work long hours in the studio to pay for the session. It was during this session that the band first recorded "In League with Satan" and "Live Like an Angel". Original vocalist Clive Archer sang on "In League with Satan", while Lant sang on "Live Like an Angel". According to guitarist Jeff "Mantas" Dunn, he wrote "Live Like an Angel" with the idea that Lant would fulfill vocal duties for the song at live shows allowing Archer to go off stage for a costume change and resume singing on the next song. After the session, the band had a meeting and both Dunn and drummer Tony "Abaddon" Bray agreed that they preferred Lant's vocals over Clive's, and decided that Lant would become the band's new vocalist.

With the band now a three-piece and Neat Records surprised that Barton, a classic rock fan, seemed to take to the band so strongly, agreed to release a Venom single. Recording began in January 1981 and Venom was asked to work with record producer Steve Thompson, which would prove to be Thompson's final production for the label. The band recorded three tracks: "Angel Dust", "Live Like an Angel", and "In League with Satan", and Neat Records, fond of "In League with Satan", decided it would be the lead single and "Angel Dust" was left off the single but would appear on the Neat compilation album, Lead Weight.

The final version of the song opens with a demonic voice created with the backmasking technique. The voice was created by Lant intoning "Satan, raised in hell, I'm gonna burn your soul, crush your bones, I'm gonna make you bleed, you gonna bleed for me." This is one of the earliest instances of a Satanic subliminal message in a commercially released rock song.

== Music and lyrics ==
Like most of the songs of the band's debut album, the music on "In League with Satan" is a combination of heavy metal, punk, and speed metal. It has also often been cited as the first black metal song ever released, due to its aggressive, satanic lyrics. Unlike the demo or single version of the song, the album version of the song opens with a reversed recording of a demonic-sounding voice by using the backmasking technique. By spinning the original vinyl counterclockwise, the voice of Lant can be heard saying "Satan, raised in hell, I'm gonna burn your soul, crush your bones, I'm gonna make you bleed, you gonna bleed for me" can be heard. Jeff Dunn explains that this was added to the song to "make the song sound more evil."

This gives way to a slow and heavy percussive tribal rhythm by drummer "Abaddon" followed by the main riff. Although much of the band's early music is known for its fast tempo, "In League with Satan" is a mid-tempo song, heavily influenced by Dunn's love of Kiss. Lant recalls that the song was Venoms attempt at writing a song similar to that of "God of Thunder". Dunn describes the guitar solo as "just a bunch of single, sustained notes with feedback - just noise, really."

== Reception ==
In his June 13, 1981 review of the single, Edwin Pouncey of Sounds wrote:

"Venom are totally corrupt and while this piece of demon riddled canker pales in comparison to the version they laid down and sent to the king of Kerrang!, it still makes the best listening of this genre since 'Iron Man' by Black Sabbath As for the rest of you, wake up at the front!" — Pouncey

Due to the success and positive reception to the single, Neat Records asked the band to record all the material that they had. These re-recorded demos, completed in just three days, would eventually become the band's debut album Welcome to Hell. Eduardo Rivadavia of AllMusic cites "In League with Satan" as an album highlight along with the title track and "One Thousand Days in Sodom", referring to them as "timeless satanic onslaughts". He also references "Live Like an Angel" as rounding out the album in "bombastic fashion".

== Legacy and influence ==
"In League with Satan" has been widely cited as the first black metal song, with a profound influence on later developments in thrash metal, death metal, and extreme metal. It was one of the earliest rock songs to use unapologetic satanic imagery, and it is often cited by critics and moralists who believe that heavy metal music has connections to Satanism. However, some commentators have noticed that the song's allusions to Satan were ironic and used superficially to create an image.

In addition to covering the song, Canadian parody metal band Zimmers Hole references "In League with Satan" in the title of their album When You Were Shouting at the Devil... We Were in League with Satan.

== Credits ==
=== Single ===
- Venom – producer, performers
  - Conrad "Cronos" Lant – bass guitar, vocals
  - Jeffrey "Mantas" Dunn – guitars
  - Tony "Abaddon" Bray – drums
- Steve Thompson – producer, engineer

=== Album ===
- Venom – producer, performers
  - Conrad "Cronos" Lant – bass guitar, vocals
  - Jeffrey "Mantas" Dunn – guitars
  - Tony "Abaddon" Bray – drums
- Keith Nichol – producer, engineer
