= The Waste Lands (album) =

Studio album by Venom
- Released: 29 October 1992
- Recorded: Lynx Studios, Newcastle, England
- Genre: Heavy metal; thrash metal; speed metal
- Length: 41:35
- Label: Under One Flag
- Producer: Kevin Ridley

Venom chronology
Temples of Ice (1991)	The Waste Lands (1992)	Cast in Stone (1997)

Professional ratings
Review scores
Source	Rating
AllMusic	4/5 stars
Collector's Guide to Heavy Metal	7/10

The Waste Lands is the eighth studio album by British heavy metal band Venom. It is the last with bassist/singer Tony "Demolition Man" Dolan and also the last before the reunion of the classic Venom line-up from their first four albums, Welcome to Hell, Black Metal, At War with Satan and Possessed. Like the previous album, Temples of Ice, the album was originally supposed to be produced by ex-Child's Play producer Howard Benson, however he was once again unavailable so the band decided to stay with Kevin Ridley. The working title for this album was Kissing the Beast, but the band changed it when they got the album cover from Tari József (Aurea Aetas).

== Track listing ==
All songs were written by Anthony Bray, Tony Dolan and Jeff Dunn.

No.	Title	Length
1.	"Cursed"	7:38
2.	"I'm Paralysed"	2:32
3.	"Black Legions"	3:44
4.	"Riddle of Steel"	2:47
5.	"Need to Kill"	5:11
6.	"Kissing the Beast"	3:23
7.	"Crucified"	3:32
8.	"Shadow King"	3:51
9.	"Wolverine"	4:08
10.	"Clarisse"	4:49

== Credits ==
- Tony "Demolition Man" Dolan – bass, vocals
- Jeff "Mantas" Dunn – guitars
- Steve "War Maniac" White – additional guitars
- V.X.S. – keyboards and sound effects
- Anthony "Abaddon" Bray – drums
- Kevin Ridley – producer, engineer
