= Bloodlust (Venom song) =

1982 single by Venom (speed metal band)

Single by Venom
- B-side: "In Nomine Satanas"
- Released: August 13, 1982
- Studio: Impulse Studios in Newcastle, England
- Genre: Heavy metal; speed metal; thrash metal; black metal
- Length: 6:25
- Label: Neat (UK)
- Songwriters: Conrad "Cronos" Lant; Jeffrey "Mantas" Dunn; Tony "Abaddon" Bray
- Producer: Venom

Venom singles chronology
"In League with Satan" (1981)	"Bloodlust" (1982)	"Die Hard" (1983)

"Bloodlust" is a single released by English speed metal band Venom on August 13, 1982 through Neat Records. It is the bands second single and the follow-up to their debut single "In League with Satan".

Side B contains the song "In Nomine Satanas". Live versions of the songs appear on their 1986 live album Eine Kleine Nachtmusik as well as re-recorded versions of both songs with "Bloodlust" appearing on some versions of their ninth album Cast in Stone on a bonus disc of 10 re-recorded tracks, and "In Nomine Satanas" on a rare limited edition 1996 mini album. Both these versions were on the 2006 expanded edition of the album. Another version entitled "Bloodlust (Radio 1 Session)" would appear on the 2002 CD reissue of Black Metal.

== Writing and recording ==
The song "Bloodlust" is one of the bands oldest songs originally written by vocalist and bassist Conrad "Cronos" Lant while he was still with his previous band Dwarfstar.

While recording the single another song, "Senile Decay", was also recorded but was not released until 1985 on the bands compilation album From Hell To The Unknown....

== Music and lyrics ==
The lyrics of the single deal with horror folklore and Satanism. "Bloodlust" tells the story of "Count Cronos", a character (named after Lant's stage name) engaging in vampiric behaviours such as stalking his prey in the night and biting into their necks, draining them of "your life giving blood" and leaving them to die. "In Nomine Satanas" is written in a mix of English and Latin. It tells of the story of Satan's legions rising, praising him and singing his songs, then finally launching a war on humanity "In the name of Satan".

== Music video ==
In September 1982, the band released a 2-track video entitled Live Sept '82. The video shows the band playing two tracks, a newly recorded version of "Witching Hour" and "Bloodlust", on stage complete with smoke effects and pyrotechnics. The purpose for producing these videos was to give potential promotors/venues an idea of what a Venom live show would be like, for example, what size/height of stage would be required as well as specs for the pyrotechnics as the band was looking to emulate Kiss’s stage show. According to Lant, the band encountered difficulties in their native Britain with many of their tour dates being announced and cancelled at the last minute due to some venues not allowing the use of pyrotechnics. This would turn out to be an issue that would plague the band throughout their career.

== Reception ==
In his review of the bands sophomore effort Black Metal, Eduardo Rivadavia of AllMusic called "Bloodlust" an absolute classic along with another Venom song, "Countess Bathory". Edwin Pouncy of Sounds magazine wrote a raving review and made it the Single of the week.

"Bloodlust is the almost too perfect hell brew spew laden magnum opus that leaves nothing to the imagination." — Pouncy

== Track listing ==
All tracks are written by Bray/Dunn/Lant.

Side A
No.	Title	Length
1.	"Bloodlust"	2:57

Side B
No.	Title	Length
2.	"In Nomine Satanas"	3:28

== Credits ==
- Venom – producer, performers
  - Conrad "Cronos" Lant – bass, vocals
  - Jeffrey "Mantas" Dunn – guitars
  - Tony "Abaddon" Bray – drums
- Venom – producer, engineer
