= Cronos (band) =

English heavy metal band

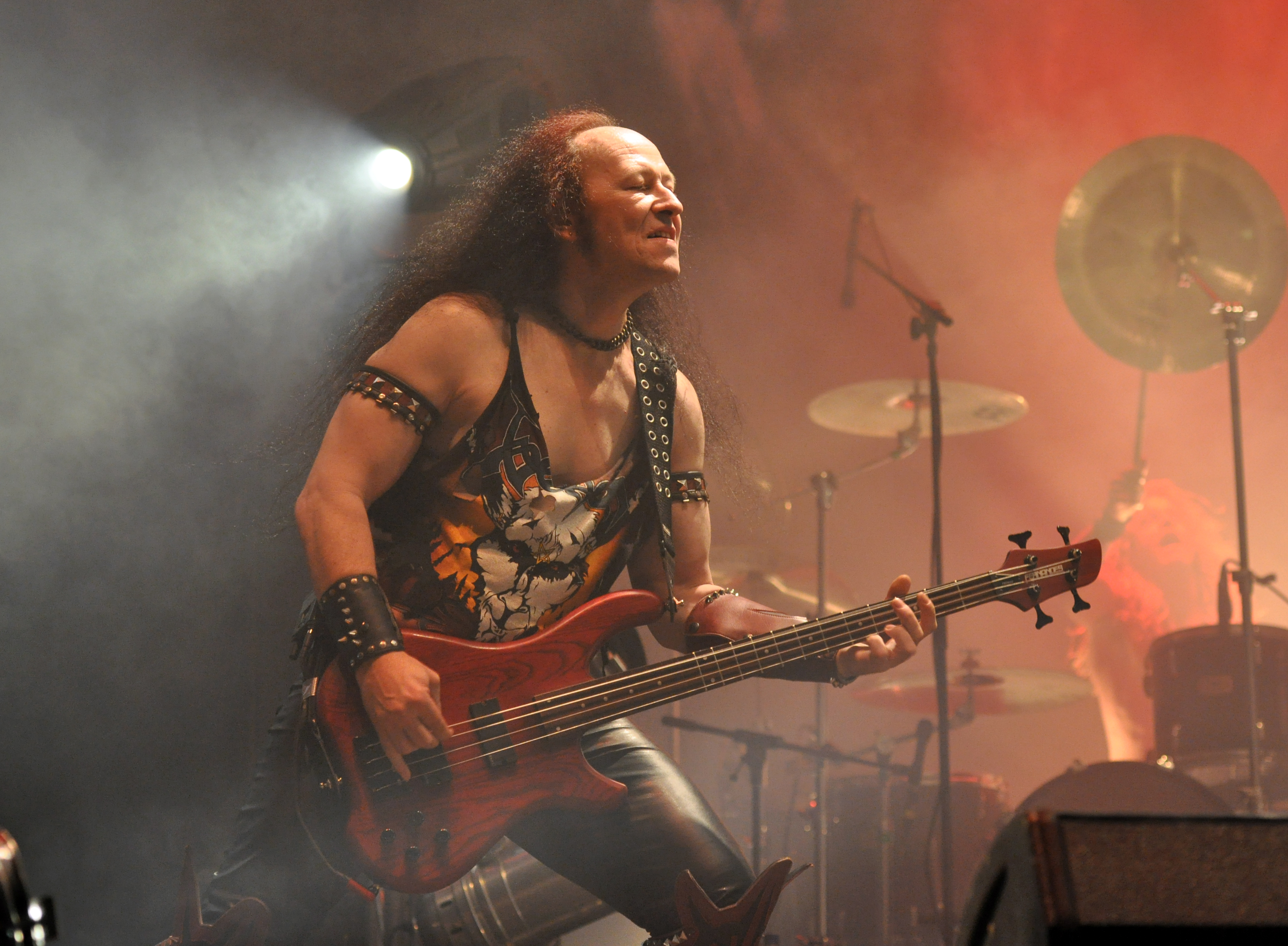
- Conrad "Cronos" Lant performing in 2013

Background information
- Origin: Newcastle upon Tyne, England
- Genres: Heavy metal, thrash metal
- Years active: 1988–1996
- Label: Neat Metal
- Past members: Conrad "Cronos" Lant; Mike Hickey; James Clare; Chris Patterson; Ian McCormack; Mark Ramsey Wharton

Cronos were an English heavy metal band formed in 1988 by Venom frontman Conrad "Cronos" Lant.

== History ==
Conrad "Cronos" Lant's eponymous band formed after disappointing sales of Venom's Calm Before the Storm album led him to quit Venom. He took with him the two guitarists, Mike Hickey and James Clare, that Venom had hired to replace founding guitarist Jeff "Mantas" Dunn, upon his departure in 1986. The three ex-Venom members added drummer Chris Patterson to complete Cronos' initial line-up, releasing Dancing in the Fire in 1990, followed by 1991's Rock n' Roll Disease.

Clare and Patterson both left in the years following, with the latter briefly replaced by drummer Ian McCormack and later by ex-Cathedral and Acid Reign drummer Mark Ramsey Wharton. A third album, Triumvirate, was recorded but never released. Instead, the band released the confusingly-titled Venom in 1995, which collected songs from the first two records, material from Triumvirate, as well as re-recorded Venom material performed by the current Cronos line-up. In 1995, the 'classic' Venom lineup reformed, cancelling the release of Triumvirate and sending Cronos (the group) into permanent hiatus. Hickey then embarked on a brief stint touring with the English death metal band Carcass.

Lant has been active with Venom ever since. Hickey also rejoined Venom in 2005, but departed again two years later. Cronos' 2006 Hell to the Unknown double-CD repackages the Venom album with further rarities, demos, and previously released material.

== Members ==
- Conrad "Cronos" Lant – vocals, bass (1988–1996)
- Mike Hickey – guitar, vocals (1988–1996)
- James Clare – guitar, keyboards, vocals (1988–1993)
- Chris Patterson – drums (1988–1992)
- Ian McCormack – drums (1992–1993)
- Mark Ramsey Wharton – drums (1993–1995)

== Discography ==
- Dancing in the Fire (1990)
- Rock n' Roll Disease (1993)
- Venom (1995)
- Hell to the Unknown (2006) – anthology release
