= Prime Evil (album) =

Studio album by Venom
- Released: 9 October 1989
- Recorded: 1989
- Studio: Lynx Studio, Newcastle
- Genre: Heavy metal; thrash metal; speed metal
- Length: 39:55
- Label: Under One Flag
- Producer: Nick Tauber, Kevin Ridley

Venom chronology
| Calm Before the Storm (1987) | Prime Evil (1989) | Temples of Ice (1991) |

Professional ratings
Review scores
| Source | Rating |
|---|---|
| AllMusic | 3/5 stars |
| Collector's Guide to Heavy Metal | 8/10 |

Prime Evil is the sixth studio album by British heavy metal band Venom. It was released in 1989 and is the first in a series of three albums with Atomkraft bassist and vocalist Tony Dolan, replacing Conrad "Cronos" Lant, as a band member and composer.

== Track listing ==
All tracks are written by Venom, except where indicated.

| No. | Title | Writer(s) | Length |
|---|---|---|---|
| 1. | "Prime Evil" | | 4:38 |
| 2. | "Parasite" | | 3:08 |
| 3. | "Blackened Are the Priests" | Tony Dolan | 4:19 |
| 4. | "Carnivorous" | Dolan | 2:11 |
| 5. | "Skeletal Dance" | | 3:07 |
| 6. | "Megalomania" (Black Sabbath cover) | Geezer Butler, Tony Iommi, Ozzy Osbourne, Bill Ward | 5:25 |
| 7. | "Insane" | | 2:54 |
| 8. | "Harder Than Ever" | | 3:09 |
| 9. | "Into the Fire" | | 3:23 |
| 10. | "Skool Daze" | | 4:23 |
| 11. | "Live Like an Angel – Die Like a Devil" (re-recording available on the CD edition of the album) | Conrad Lant, Anthony Bray, Jeffrey Dunn | 3:05 |

== Personnel ==
Venom

- Demolition Man – bass, vocals
- Mantas – lead guitar
- Al Barnes – rhythm guitar
- Abaddon – drums, percussion

Production

- Nick Tauber, Kevin Ridley – production
- Barry Clempson – engineering
- Steve Brew – assistant engineering
