= Calm Before the Storm (Venom album) =

Studio album by Venom
- Released: 9 November 1987
- Recorded: 1987
- Studio: The New Marquee Studios, London
- Genre: Heavy metal
- Length: 36:20
- Label: Filmtrax
- Producer: Nick Tauber and Venom

Venom chronology
Eine kleine Nachtmusik (1986)	Calm Before the Storm (1987)	Prime Evil (1989)

Professional ratings
Review scores
Source	Rating
AllMusic	2/5 stars
Collector's Guide to Heavy Metal	7/10

Calm Before the Storm is the fifth studio album by British heavy metal band Venom. The original title of the album would have been Deadline, but the title was changed when guitarist Jeffrey "Mantas" Dunn left the band and was replaced by Jimi Clare and Mike Hickey. Both were to follow bassist Conrad "Cronos" Lant in his later solo career and the latter would also return on the 2006 album Metal Black.

The album is characterised by a "cleaner", more synthetic sound when compared to Venom's other albums. Especially the drums, which sound almost like a drum machine, are contributing to this fact. Also, the guitar has a brighter sound and is easily distinguishable from the bass. The change in sound is perhaps mostly due to the addition of another guitarist and the producer Nick Tauber, who had previously worked with hard rock acts such as UFO and Thin Lizzy.

== Track listing ==
All tracks by Conrad Lant unless noted.

Side one
No.	Title	Writer(s)	Length
1.	"Black Xmas"		2:57
2.	"The Chanting of the Priests"	Lant, Anthony Bray	4:25
3.	"Metal Punk"		3:24
4.	"Under a Spell"		4:09
5.	"Calm Before the Storm"	Lant, Bray, James Clare	4:14

Side two
No.	Title	Writer(s)	Length
6.	"Fire"		2:42
7.	"Krackin' Up"		2:15
8.	"Beauty and the Beast"		3:49
9.	"Deadline"		3:17
10.	"Gypsy"		2:25
11.	"Muscle"	Lant, Clare	2:43

== Personnel ==
Venom

- Cronos – vocals, bass
- Mike "Mykus" Hickey – guitars, backing vocals
- James Clare – guitars, keyboards, backing vocals
- Abaddon – drums, backing vocals

Production

- Nick Tauber – producer
- Keith Nichol, Andy Lovell – engineers
- Stuart Brown, Nigel Broad – assistant engineers
- Aaron Chakraverty – mastering
