= Temples of Ice =

Studio album by Venom
- Released: 17 June 1991
- Recorded: 1990
- Studio: Lynx Studios, Newcastle, England
- Genre: Heavy metal; speed metal; thrash metal
- Length: 39:24
- Label: Under One Flag
- Producer: Kevin Ridley, Venom

Venom chronology
Prime Evil (1989)	Temples of Ice (1991)	The Waste Lands (1992)

Professional ratings
Review scores
Source	Rating
AllMusic	4/5 stars
Collector's Guide to Heavy Metal	7/10
Rock Hard	7/10

Temples of Ice is the seventh studio album by English heavy metal band Venom. The album was originally supposed to be produced by ex-Child's Play producer Howard Benson; however, he was unavailable. The band decided to stay with Kevin Ridley, who co-produced the band's previous album Prime Evil. It was released on Under One Flag records in 1991, and marketed and distributed by Music for Nations.

== Track listing ==
All tracks are written by Venom, except where indicated.

No.	Title	Writer(s)	Length
1.	"Tribes"		3:44
2.	"Even in Heaven"		3:57
3.	"Trinity MCMXLV 0530"		3:33
4.	"In Memory of (Paul Miller 1964–90)"		4:17
5.	"Faerie Tale"		4:21
6.	"Playtime"		3:18
7.	"Acid"		4:13
8.	"Arachnid"		2:42
9.	"Speed King" (Deep Purple cover)	Ritchie Blackmore, Ian Gillan, Roger Glover, Jon Lord, Ian Paice	3:31
10.	"Temples of Ice"		6:44

== Personnel ==
Venom

- Tony "Demolition Man" Dolan – vocals, bass
- Jeff "Mantas" Dunn – guitar
- Al Barnes – guitar
- Anthony "Abaddon" Bray – drums

Production

- Engineered by Kevin Ridley
- Mixed by Kevin Ridley and Pete Peck at Great Linford Manor, England
