= Storm the Gates =

Studio album by Venom
- Released: 14 December 2018
- Recorded: 2016–2018
- Studios: Thunderoar OQB; Doom Mobile; OffWorld Mobile Recording; Insomniac Sound & Vision
- Genres: Heavy metal; thrash metal
- Length: 53:10
- Label: Spinefarm
- Producer: Conrad Lant

Venom chronology
From the Very Depths (2015)	Storm the Gates (2018)	Into Oblivion (2026)

Storm the Gates is the fifteenth studio album by the English heavy metal band Venom. It was released by Spinefarm on 14 December 2018.

== Track listing ==
All lyrics are written by Conrad Lant; all music is composed by Lant, John Dixon, and Daniel Needham

Storm the Gates track listing
No.	Title	Length
1.	"Bring Out Your Dead"	3:22
2.	"Notorious"	4:16
3.	"I Dark Lord"	4:41
4.	"100 Miles to Hell"	4:48
5.	"Dark Night (Of the Soul)"	4:48
6.	"Beaten to a Pulp"	3:14
7.	"Destroyer"	4:18
8.	"The Mighty Have Been Fallen"	3:15
9.	"Over My Dead Body"	5:07
10.	"Suffering Dictates"	3:10
11.	"We the Loud"	3:55
12.	"Immortal"	4:31
13.	"Storm the Gates"	3:47

== Personnel ==
Credits are adapted from the album's liner notes.

=== Venom ===
- Cronos – vocals, bass guitar, production, album sleeve design concept, theme, logos, titles, layouts, booklet designs, backgrounds, other illustrations
- Rage – guitars
- Dante – drums

=== Additional contributors ===
- Will "Popeye" Campbell – engineering
- Raed Gadjee – engineering
- Graeme H. Nelson – additional engineering
- Oli Morgan – mixing
- Nick Watson – mastering
- Nikos Outsikas – album sleeve artwork illustration
- Radvicioust – Satyr de Mendes artwork
- Sigiriya "Sigi" Omega – photographs, visual effects, artistic coordination
- Wojtek & Raed – back sleeve artwork, vinyl artwork
- Dan Capp – album technical layouts
