= From the Very Depths =

Studio album by Venom
- Released: 27 January 2015
- Recorded: 2012–2014
- Genres: Heavy metal; thrash metal
- Length: 51:41
- Label: Spinefarm

Venom chronology
Fallen Angels (2011)	From the Very Depths (2015)	Storm the Gates (2018)

Professional ratings
Review scores
Source	Rating
AllMusic	2.5/5 stars
Blabbermouth.net	8/10
Classic Rock	3.5/5 stars
MetalSucks	4/5 stars
Record Collector	4/5 stars
Rolling Stone	2/5 stars

From the Very Depths is the fourteenth studio album by English heavy metal band Venom. It was released by Spinefarm on 27 January 2015.

== Track listing ==
All tracks are written by Conrad T. Lant.

No.	Title	Length
1.	"Eruptus"	1:01
2.	"From the Very Depths"	3:54
3.	"The Death of Rock 'n' Roll"	3:09
4.	"Smoke"	5:01
5.	"Temptation"	3:52
6.	"Long Haired Punks"	4:02
7.	"Stigmata Satanas"	3:26
8.	"Crucified"	4:06
9.	"Evil Law"	5:03
10.	"Grinding Teeth"	4:11
11.	"Ouverture"	1:16
12.	"Mephistopheles"	4:06
13.	"Wings of Valkyrie"	4:00
14.	"Rise"	4:34
Total length:		51:41

== Credits ==
- Cronos – bass, lead vocals
- La Rage – guitars, backing vocals
- Dante – drums, backing vocals

== Charts ==
Chart (2015)	Peak position
Belgian Albums (Ultratop Wallonia)	177
