= Anthony Lant =

English drummer

Antony Lant
- Also known as: Antton
- Born: United Kingdom
- Genres: Thrash metal; black metal; speed metal; heavy metal; groove metal
- Occupation: Musician
- Instruments: Drums; guitar
- Website: reverbnation.com/defconone

Antony "Antton" Lant is an English drummer, best known for his time with thrash metal band Venom. He was the band's drummer from 2000 to 2009 and recorded three albums with them.

Lant left Venom in 2009 so he could concentrate on his groove metal band Def-Con-One. He was also a part of the metal band Dryll together with former Venom guitarist Jeffrey Dunn. Although he is best known as a drummer, he is also an avid guitarist. Lant played drums for Mpire of Evil (formerly Primevil) alongside Jeffrey Dunn and Tony Dolan until 2012 before leaving to concentrate on Def-Con-One. In 2012, they released the album Warface with Lant on drums.

== Personal life ==
Lant played with his brother Conrad "Cronos" Lant in Venom, and Lant's oldest brother is Graham Lant, former drummer of Prefab Sprout.

Lant is a direct cousin of Nornagest, the frontman of Enthroned.

== Discography ==
=== With Venom ===
- Resurrection (2000)
- Metal Black (2006)
- Hell (2008)

=== With Mpire of Evil ===
- Creatures of The Black (2011)
- Hell to the Holy (2012)

=== With Def-Con-One ===
- Warface (2012)
- II (2014)
