= Metal Black =

Studio album by Venom
- Released: 27 March 2006
- Recorded: DoomtooN Facilities, UK
- Genres: Thrash metal; heavy metal
- Length: 57:21
- Label: Castle/Sanctuary
- Producer: Conrad Lant

Venom chronology
Resurrection (2000)	Metal Black (2006)	Hell (2008)

Professional ratings
Review scores
Source	Rating
About.com	4/5 stars
AllMusic	3.5/5 stars
Blabbermouth.net	8/10

Metal Black is the eleventh studio album by heavy metal band Venom. It was released in 2006 through Castle/Sanctuary. It is the last to feature Mykvs on guitar. The name of the album is a play on their 1982 album Black Metal, one of the band's best known LPs.

== Track listing ==
No.	Title	Length
1.	"Antechrist"	3:28
2.	"Burn in Hell"	2:57
3.	"House of Pain"	5:05
4.	"Death & Dying"	3:52
5.	"Regé Satanas"	3:45
6.	"Darkest Realm"	3:12
7.	"A Good Day to Die"	3:42
8.	"Assassin"	4:45
9.	"Lucifer Rising"	4:23
10.	"Blessed Dead"	4:43
11.	"Hours of Darkness"	4:15
12.	"Sleep When I'm Dead"	3:53
13.	"Maleficarvm"	6:04
14.	"Metal Black"	3:11

== Credits ==
- Cronos – bass, vocals
- Mykvs – guitar
- Antton – drums
