= Resurrection (Venom album) =

Studio album by Venom
- Released: 25 April 2000
- Recorded: Karo Musik Studios, Hamburg, Germany
- Genre: Thrash metal; heavy metal; groove metal
- Length: 55:22
- Label: SPV/Steamhammer
- Producer: Conrad Lant

Venom chronology
Cast in Stone (1997)	Resurrection (2000)	Metal Black (2006)

Professional ratings
Review scores
Source	Rating
AllMusic	3/5 stars
Kerrang!	2/5 stars

Resurrection is the tenth album by heavy metal band Venom. It was released on SPV/Steamhammer in 2000. It is the last Venom album to feature original member Mantas on guitar.

== Track listing ==
No.	Title	Length
1.	"Resurrection"	3:03
2.	"Vengeance"	3:51
3.	"War Against Christ"	4:23
4.	"All There Is Fear"	4:42
5.	"Pain"	4:02
6.	"Pandemonium"	4:31
7.	"Loaded"	2:44
8.	"Firelight"	4:55
9.	"Black Flame (Of Satan)"	4:32
10.	"Control Freak"	3:03
11.	"Disbeliever"	3:40
12.	"Man, Myth and Magic"	3:49
13.	"Thirteen"	3:37
14.	"Leviathan"	4:30

== Credits ==
- Cronos – bass guitar, vocals
- Mantas – guitar
- Antton – drums
