= Fallen Angels (Venom album) =

Studio album by Venom
- Released: 28 November 2011
- Recorded: 2010–2011
- Studio: Thunderoar OQB Studio, Doom Mobile, Offworld Mobile, Insomniak Sound and Vision, UK
- Genre: Thrash metal; heavy metal; groove metal
- Length: 57:37
- Label: Spinefarm/Universal
- Producer: Conrad Lant

Venom chronology
Hell (2008)	Fallen Angels (2011)	From the Very Depths (2015)

Professional ratings
Review scores
Source	Rating
AllMusic	2.5/5 stars
The Metal Critic	7.6/10
Ashladan	6.3/10

Fallen Angels is the thirteenth studio album by English heavy metal band Venom. It was released by Spinefarm/Universal on 28 November 2011.

== Track listing ==
No.	Title	Length
1.	"Hammerhead"	5:00
2.	"Nemesis"	3:07
3.	"Pedal to the Metal"	3:43
4.	"Lap of the Gods"	5:09
5.	"Damnation of Souls"	4:30
6.	"Beggarman"	4:29
7.	"Hail Satanas"	4:33
8.	"Sin"	5:33
9.	"Punk's Not Dead"	4:10
10.	"Death Be Thy Name"	3:10
11.	"Lest We Forget"	2:15
12.	"Valley of the Kings"	4:52
13.	"Fallen Angels"	7:06

Bonus tracks (limited edition, first pressing)
No.	Title	Length
14.	"Annunaki Legacy"	4:24
15.	"Blackened Blues"	4:52

== Credits ==
- Cronos – vocals, bass guitar
- La Rage – guitar, backing vocals
- Dante – drums, backing vocals
