= Hell (Venom album) =

Studio album by Venom
- Released: 9 June 2008 (UK); 10 June 2008 (US)
- Recorded: DoomtooN Facilities, UK
- Genre: Thrash metal; heavy metal
- Length: 55:25
- Label: Spinefarm/Universal
- Producer: Conrad Lant

Venom chronology
Metal Black (2006)	Hell (2008)	Fallen Angels (2011)

Professional ratings
Review scores
Source	Rating
AllMusic	3/5 stars
IGN	8/10

Hell is the twelfth studio album by heavy metal band Venom. It was released in 2008 through Universal. It is the first Venom album to feature La Rage on guitar and the last to feature Antton on drums, who left Venom in 2009 and was replaced by Danté.

== Track listing ==
All lyrics are written by Cronos except where noted; all music is composed by Cronos and Antton.

No.	Title	Length
1.	"Straight to Hell"	4:28
2.	"The Power and the Glory"	5:09
3.	"Hand of God"	4:35
4.	"Fall from Grace"	3:29
5.	"Hell"	5:08
6.	"Evil Perfection"	3:36
7.	"Stab U in the Back"	4:33
8.	"Armageddon"	3:28
9.	"Kill the Music"	3:15
10.	"Evilution Devilution"	4:29
11.	"Blood Sky"	5:13
12.	"USA for Satan"	4:51
13.	"Dirge/The Awakening" (Instrumental)	3:30

A limited edition digipack version also includes live versions of "In League with Satan" and "Burn in Hell" from the 2007 Scandinavian tour.

== Credits ==
- Cronos – vocals, bass guitar
- La Rage – guitar
- Antton – drums
