= Tony Dolan =

English musician (born 1964)

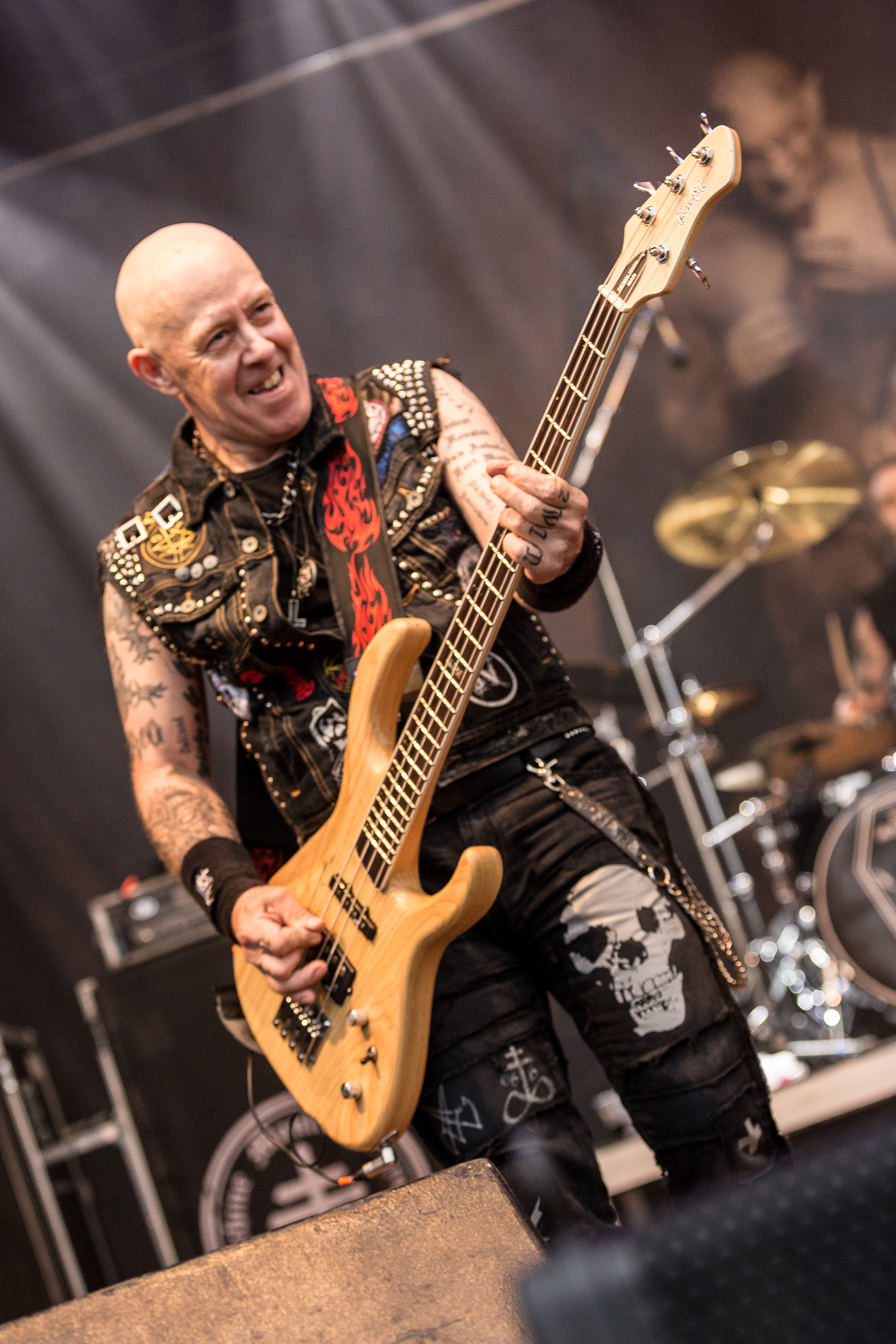
- Dolan performing with Venom Inc. in 2019

Background information
- Also known as: Demolition Man
- Born: 1964 (age 61–62); Wallsend, England
- Origin: Newcastle, England
- Genres: Speed metal; thrash metal; heavy metal; black metal
- Occupations: Musician; songwriter
- Instruments: Vocals; bass
- Member of: Atomkraft; Venom Inc.
- Formerly of: Venom; Mpire of Evil
- Website: tonydolan.tripod.com

Anthony Michael Dolan (born 1964), also known by his nickname Demolition Man, is an English musician. He was the bassist and vocalist of heavy metal band Venom in the late 1980s and early 1990s. He currently plays in Atomkraft and Venom Inc., the latter of which he formed with fellow former Venom member Mantas.

== Biography ==
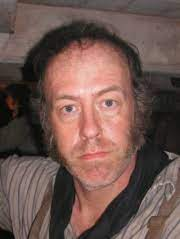
Dolan in stage clothes, circa 2002

Dolan and Paul Spillett formed Atomkraft in Newcastle upon Tyne in 1979. Dolan was a vocalist from 1979 to 1986, and played guitars from 1979 to 1981 and on to 1988, just before they broke up. From 1981 to 1987, he played bass guitar. When Atomkraft was reformed in 2004, Dolan took up the duty of vocalist and bassist again. In 1988, he was offered a role of bassist and vocalist for the prominent heavy metal band Venom. He recorded four albums with Venom before leaving the band in 1993. Dolan also participated in other acts, including Mantas (solo band by former Venom guitarist Jeffrey "Mantas" Dunn), Dogmatix and Raubtier. In 2010, with Jeffrey Dunn and Anthony Lant, he started playing bass guitar and singing in Mpire of Evil.

Dolan has also had acting roles and played in films like Master and Commander and Dirty War.

== Equipment ==
- Aria Pro II Cardinal Series CSB-380
- Aria Pro II SB-1000
- Ibanez Artist bass (red finish, as seen on the Venom Live 90 gig)
- Overwater bass
- M-16 bass
- Infinity Perspex bass
- B.C.Rich Zombie bass clone
- Washburn five-string
- Rickenbacker 4001
- LTD F-414FM
- Brian May guitar

In 2017, Dolan announced an exclusive deal with Dutch guitar builder Bo~EL Guitars. He plays the Bo~EL Big Generator bass guitar.

== Discography ==
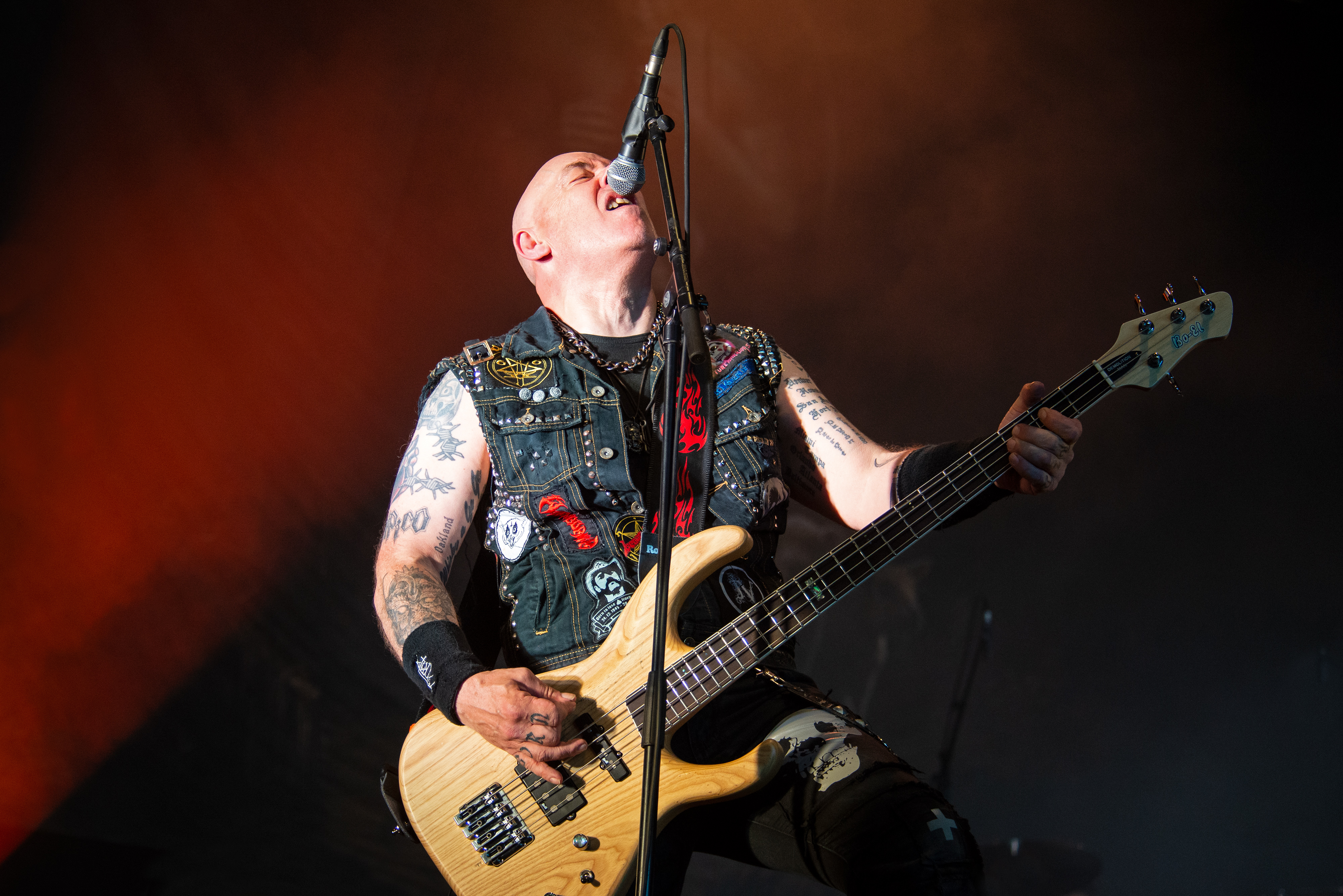
Dolan with Venom Inc. at Hellfest 2019

=== With Atomkraft ===
- Future Warriors (1985)
- Queen of Death EP (1986)
- Tonpress (1987)
- Conductors of Noize (1987)
- Total Metal: The Neat Anthology (2005)

=== With Venom ===
- Prime Evil (1989)
- Tear Your Soul Apart (EP) (1990)
- Temples of Ice (1991)
- The Waste Lands (1992)

=== With Mpire of Evil ===
- Creatures of the Black (EP, 2011)
- Hell to the Holy (2012)
- Crucified (2013)

=== With Venom Inc. ===
- Avé (2017)
- There's Only Black (2022)

=== Other projects ===
- Dogmatix – Conspiracy (2000) – guitars, bass guitar
- Mantas – Zero Tolerance (2004) – bass guitar
- Superthriller – Zero (2004) – blues guitar solo on "Upgrade"
- Joe Matera – Slave to the Fingers (EP, 2011) – bass guitar
- Joe Matera – Creature of Habit (LP, 2012) – bass guitar
- Eversin – Tears on the Face of God (2012) – vocals on "Nightblaster"
- Virus – Metal 2 the Masses North Wales (2021) – bass guitar at "Metal 2 the Masses North Wales"

== Filmography ==
- Master and Commander: The Far Side of the World (2003) – Mr. Lamb, Carpenter
- Battlefield Britain (2004) – Royal Musketeer-Prisoner
- Dirty War (2004) – Lead TSG Officer
