= Into Oblivion (Venom album) =

Studio album by Venom
- Released: 1 May 2026
- Genres: Heavy metal; thrash metal; black metal
- Length: 43:52
- Labels: BMG; Noise
- Producer: Conrad Lant

Venom chronology
Storm the Gates (2018)	Into Oblivion (2026)

Singles from Into Oblivion
- 1. "Lay Down Your Soul" Released: 10 March 2026; 2. "Kicked Outta Hell" Released: 14 April 2026

Into Oblivion is the sixteenth and final studio album by the English heavy metal band Venom. It was released by BMG and Noise Records on 1 May 2026. Produced by Conrad Lant, Into Oblivion is the band's first album in eight years since Storm the Gates, which was released in 2018, making it the longest gap between studio albums in the band's career. It is also their final studio album to be released prior to the death of Lant in September 2026.

== Background and composition ==
On 5 March 2026, Venom announce their sixteenth studio album, and their first in eight years, Into Oblivion. Unlike some of their previous works, Into Oblivion featured a more lively and polished sound, which was noted by music critics. The material combines elements of Venom's classic 1980s sound with more modern thrash metal and hard rock influences. Lyrically the band traditionally explores Satanic and occult themes, as well as self-references, particularly the 1982 song "Black Metal".

== Artwork ==
The artwork for Into Oblivion depicts a grey scale demon's head with an inverted cross on its forehead. It has caused some controversy due to the album art allegedly being AI generated.

== Release and promotion ==
Into Oblivion was released on 1 May 2026. "Lay Down Your Soul" was released as the album's lead single on 10 March. On 14 April, the band released the album's second single "Kicked Outta Hell".

== Critical reception ==
Professional ratings
Review scores
Source	Rating
The Arts Desk	4/5
Blabbermouth.net	7/10
Kerrang!	4/5
Spill Magazine	5/5 stars

Into Oblivion received generally positive reviews from critics. Kerrang! called the album "the best thing to come out under the Venom name since the 1980s", noting that Cronos sounds "possessed" and the guitars are "more powerful".

Spill Magazine gave the album a perfect score, calling it a "must listen" for all metal fans and "the perfect introduction" to Venom's work.

Blabbermouth.net rated the album 7 out of 10, noting that the album sounds "visceral and almost live, without being overly polished." The reviewer noted that songs are "very focused and aggressive" and are perfectly suited for live performances.

The Arts Desk reviewed Cronos and his band "as gloriously heavy, angry and catchy as ever" and the album itself was "an unrelenting and glorious noise".

== Track listing ==
All lyrics are written by Conrad "Cronos" Lant; all music is composed by Venom (Cronos, Rage and Dante).

Into Oblivion track listing
No.	Title	Length
1.	"Into Oblivion"	4:12
2.	"Lay Down Your Soul"	3:13
3.	"Nevermore"	3:06
4.	"Man & Beast"	3:30
5.	"Death the Leveller"	3:21
6.	"As Above So Below"	4:55
7.	"Kicked Outta Hell"	3:24
8.	"Legend"	3:00
9.	"Live Loud"	3:22
10.	"Metal Bloody Metal"	2:53
11.	"Dogs of War"	2:03
12.	"Deathwitch"	3:29
13.	"Unholy Mother"	3:24

== Personnel ==
=== Venom ===
- Cronos – vocals, bass guitar, production
- Rage – guitars
- Dante – drums

== Charts ==
Chart performance for Into Oblivion
Chart (2026)	Peak position
Austrian Albums (Ö3 Austria)	30
Belgian Albums (Ultratop Flanders)	183
Belgian Albums (Ultratop Wallonia)	115
French Rock & Metal Albums (SNEP)	17
German Albums (Offizielle Top 100)	35
Swedish Albums (Sverigetopplistan)	41
Swiss Albums (Schweizer Hitparade)	43
Scottish Albums (Official Charts)	58
UK Albums Sales (OCC)	34
UK Independent Album Breakers (OCC)	10
UK Rock & Metal Albums (Official Charts)	3
