= Eine kleine Nachtmusik (album) =

Live album by Venom
- Released: December 1986
- Recorded: 8 October 1985, 4–5 April 1986
- Venue: Hammersmith Odeon, London; The Ritz, New York City
- Genre: Heavy metal; speed metal; thrash metal
- Length: 71:22
- Label: Neat
- Producer: Keith Nichol

Venom chronology
Possessed (1985)	Eine kleine Nachtmusik (1986)	Calm Before the Storm (1987)

Professional ratings
Review scores
Source	Rating
AllMusic	3/5 stars
Kerrang!	3.5/5 stars
Metal Hammer (GER)	4/7 stars

Eine kleine Nachtmusik is a live album released by English heavy metal band Venom in 1986. It contains partial recordings of two different concerts with two different setlists. The first disc contains a show recorded at Hammersmith Odeon in London on 8 October 1985 and the second disc recorded at The Ritz in New York City on 4 and 5 April 1986. The title Eine kleine Nachtmusik is German for "A Little Night Music". The title is taken from Mozart's piece of the same name. The intro is a fragment of Autumn from Four Seasons by Vivaldi.

== Track listing ==
All songs written by Anthony Bray, Jeffrey Dunn and Conrad Lant, except tracks 1, 2, 5 and 9 by Dunn and Lant.

Disc 1
No.	Title	Length
1.	"Intro"	1:33
2.	"Too Loud (For the Crowd)"	2:49
3.	"7 Gates of Hell"	4:40
4.	"Leave Me in Hell"	3:10
5.	"Nightmare"	3:41
6.	"Countess Bathory"	3:36
7.	"Die Hard"	2:49
8.	"Schizo"	3:24
9.	"Guitar Solo Mantas"	3:12
10.	"In Nomine Satanas"	3:25
11.	"Witching Hour"	4:15

All songs written by Anthony Bray, Jeffrey Dunn and Conrad Lant, except tracks 2, 3, 4, 7 and 8 by Dunn and Lant.

Disc 2
No.	Title	Length
1.	"Black Metal"	3:28
2.	"The Chanting of the Priests"	4:57
3.	"Satanachist"	1:58
4.	"Fly Trap"	3:36
5.	"Warhead"	4:16
6.	"Buried Alive"	5:36
7.	"Love Amongst the Dead"	3:46
8.	"Bass Solo Cronos"	3:08
9.	"Welcome to Hell"	4:03
10.	"Bloodlust"	3:49

== Personnel ==
- Cronos – bass, vocals
- Mantas – guitar
- Abaddon – drums
