= At War with Satan =

Studio album by Venom
- Released: 16 April 1983
- Studios: Impulse Studios in Newcastle, England
- Genres: Speed metal; heavy metal; black metal
- Length: 39:45
- Label: Neat
- Producer: Venom

Venom chronology
Black Metal (1982)	At War with Satan (1983)	Possessed (1985)

At War with Satan is the third album by the British heavy metal band Venom, released on 16 April 1983. It is a concept album that tells the story of a war between Heaven and Hell which the latter side wins. It was touted as Venom's crossover into mainstream music, but failed to do so. Shortly after it went on sale, the HMV retailer withdrew the album from its shelves because of its anti-Christian content.

== Background ==
The inspiration for writing a track filling out an entire side of the record, according to Venom's bassist and vocalist Cronos, came from Rush's 2112 album. "At War with Satan" is centred on a character named Abaddon (which is also the alias of Tony Bray, Venom's drummer), who is the guardian to the gates of Hell. Cronos started writing, in his school days, a story about "how Hell revolts and takes over the heavens and throws God into Hell", a story later fleshed out as "At War with Satan". The title track's imagery and storyline largely evokes the Book of Revelation and John Milton's epic poem Paradise Lost (1667–1674), filtered through an '80's horror movie and pulp aesthetic. The catchy opening riff of the title track derives from the song "Teaser" by Tommy Bolin (1975).

With side A taken by the epic title track, side B offers the "three-minute scorchers" for which the band is best known. The metal journalist Malcolm Dome said that songs such as "Cry Wolf" showed how much Venom had matured in their songwriting without losing their edge. According to the AllMusic reviewer Eduardo Rivadavia, the album's last track, "Aaaaaarrghh", is "possibly the funniest song ever recorded".

== Artwork ==
At War with Satan's packaging resembled the leatherbound sleeve of a bookcover. A hundred-page The Book of Armageddon with the entire story of At War with Satan was supposed to be published alongside the album, but it never happened. The Swiss independent distributor Disctrade tried to interest Venom in H. R. Giger's painting Satan I (1977) to no avail. It later became the cover art of Celtic Frost's second album, To Mega Therion (1985).

== Reception ==
Professional ratings
Review scores
Source	Rating
AllMusic	4/5 stars
Collector's Guide to Heavy Metal	7/10

By the time At War with Satan went on sale, Venom had reached a crossroads in their career. Critics felt that their third album should have propelled them into the heavy metal mainstream, something which failed to materialize. Venom were also being threatened by thrash metal upstarts such as Metallica, who two months before At War with Satan's release were the opening act for Venom's Seven Dates of Hell tour (Roughly a year later Venom also took Slayer and Exodus on their North American Combat Tour). This was Metallica's first European tour, which included concerts in Switzerland, Germany, France, Belgium and the Aardschok Festival in the Netherlands.

The record was well received by major music magazines. "Proof positive that Venom are the best heavy metal band in the world", said Melody Maker's Neil Jeffries of the album. "It will definitely go down in Heavy Metal history as the ultimate headbang," claimed a Sounds reviewer of the title track. At War with Satan's entry on the "Where to Start with" section of the Kerrang! site says that this was the "last truly great record the Geordie three would make". Some criticism, though, was directed toward the album's production values, viewed as subpar.

The title track's merits divided critics. In the opinion of About.com's Chad Bowar, "At War with Satan" is at the same time "highly ambitious" and "bloated", but the song was "so over-the-top and so dramatic that it somehow worked" and made the album "an overlooked metal gem". The AllMusic review's tone was harsher: this concept piece was an "ill-advised anomaly", much of it "decidedly crap".

The rise of metal's popularity in the 1980s was paralleled by the political power gained by conservative organisations such as the Parents Music Resource Center (PMRC). The Christian campaign against the "offensive" content of rock music carried out by certain political groups in America eventually crossed over to the United Kingdom. Venom became one of its early victims: HMV stopped selling At War with Satan in fear of legal action because of Britain's obscenity laws. The PMRC later included the title track of Venom's following album Possessed in their "Filthy Fifteen" list.

== Track listing ==
All songs written by Cronos and Mantas.

Side A
No.	Title	Length
1.	"At War with Satan"	19:57

Side B
No.	Title	Length
2.	"Rip Ride"	3:09
3.	"Genocide"	2:59
4.	"Cry Wolf"	4:19
5.	"Stand Up (And Be Counted)"	3:32
6.	"Women, Leather and Hell"	3:21
7.	"Aaaaaarrghh"	2:25
Total length:		39:45

Bonus tracks in 2002 re-release by Castle Music/Sanctuary Records Group
No.	Title	Length
8.	"At War with Satan (TV Adverts)"	1:04
9.	"Warhead (12" version)"	3:40
10.	"Lady Lust (12" version)"	2.48
11.	"The Seven Gates of Hell (12" version)"	5:28
12.	"Manitou (12" version)"	4:42
13.	"Woman (12" version)"	2:56
14.	"Dead of the Night (12" version)"	4:09
15.	"Manitou (Abbey Road uncut mix)"	4:49

== Personnel ==
Venom

- Cronos – bass guitar, vocals
- Mantas – guitar
- Abaddon – drums

Production

- All songs published by Power Metal Publishing/Neat Music Publishing.
- Arranged and produced by Venom.
- Engineered and mixed by Martin Smith and Keith Nichol.

== Charts ==
Chart (1983)	Peak position
Swedish Albums (Sverigetopplistan)	48
UK Albums (OCC)	64
