= Venom (band) =

British heavy metal band

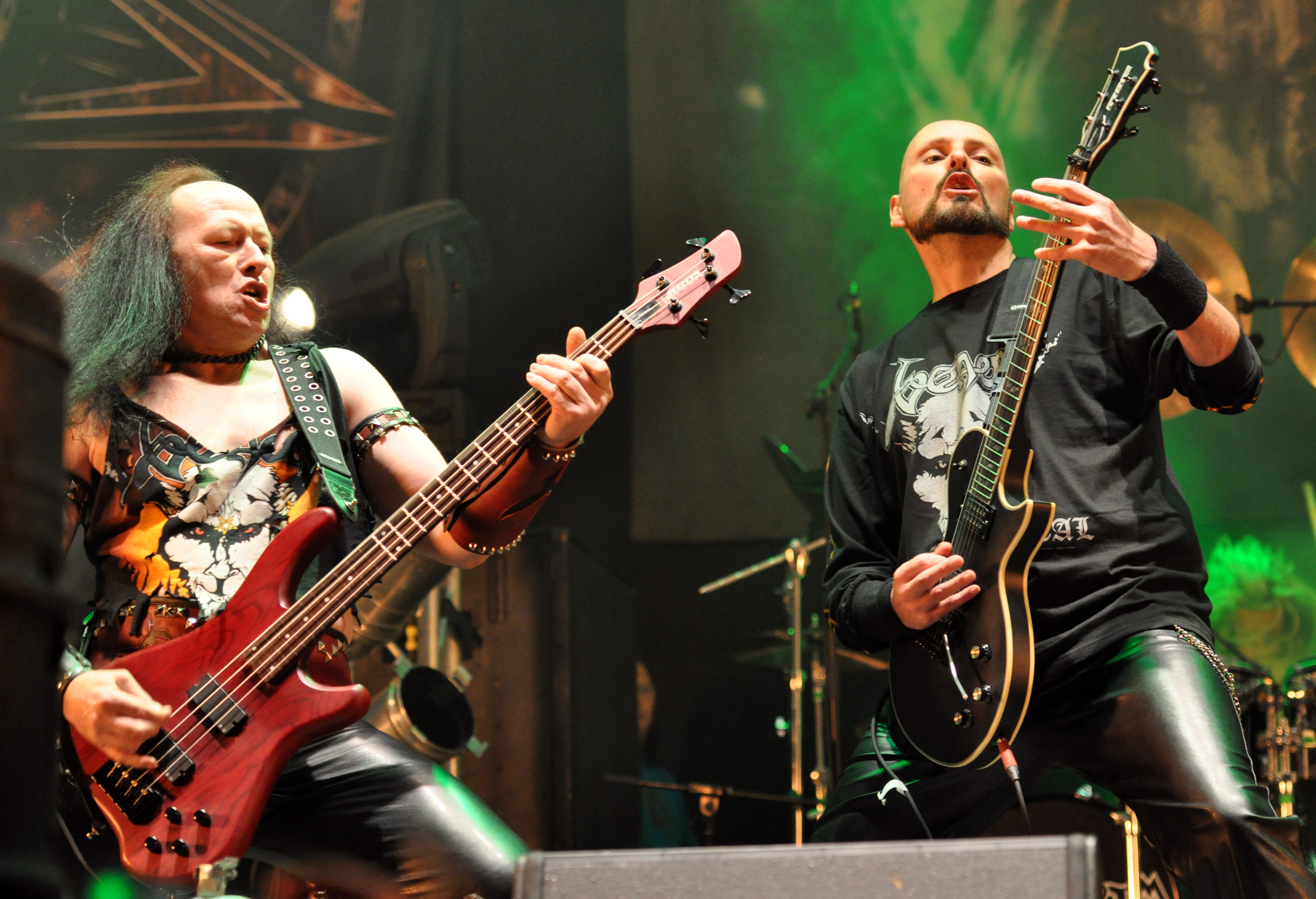
- Lant and Dixon performing in 2013

Background information
- Also known as: Guillotine (1978); Dwarfstar (1978–1979)
- Origin: Newcastle upon Tyne, England
- Genres: Heavy metal; speed metal; thrash metal; first-wave black metal
- Years active: 1978–1992; 1995–2002; 2004–2026
- Labels: Spinefarm; Neat; Filmtrax; Under One Flag; Combat; SPV; Sanctuary; Castle
- Spinoffs: Cronos; Venom Inc.
- Past members: Jeffrey "Mantas" Dunn; Conrad "Cronos" Lant; Anthony "Abaddon" Bray; Clive "Jesus Christ" Archer; Mike "Mykvs" Hickey; Jim Clare; Tony "Demolition Man" Dolan; Al Barnes; Trevor "V.X.S" Sewell; Steve "War Maniac" White; Anthony "Antton" Lant; Stuart "Rage" Dixon; Danny "Dante" Needham
- Website: venomslegions.com

Venom were an English heavy metal band formed in Newcastle upon Tyne in 1978. Coming to prominence towards the end of the new wave of British heavy metal (NWOBHM), Venom's first two albums, Welcome to Hell (1981) and Black Metal (1982), are considered major influences on black metal, thrash metal and extreme metal in general. Their second album proved influential enough that its title was used as the name of the black metal genre; as a result, Venom were part of the first wave of the genre, along with Mercyful Fate and Bathory.

Venom released sixteen studio albums and went through a series of hiatuses and line-up changes throughout its 48-year run. Original guitarist Jeffrey "Mantas" Dunn first left Venom in 1986, and vocalist/bassist Conrad "Cronos" Lant left two years later to start a solo career, leaving the band with no remaining original members. Drummer Anthony "Abaddon" Bray (who joined in 1979) continued the band with Tony "Demolition Man" Dolan as their vocalist and bassist until their hiatus in 1992. The "classic" line-up of Mantas, Cronos and Abaddon reunited in 1995, recording one album before the latter's dismissal in 1999. Abaddon was replaced by Anthony "Antton" Lant, and after the release of their tenth studio album Resurrection (2000), Venom entered a two-year hiatus. Cronos reformed the band without Mantas in 2004 and remained the only constant member until his death in 2026, resulting in the band's third breakup. Former members of the band formed their own versions of Venom at different times, most notably Venom Inc., which saw Mantas, Abaddon, and Dolan reunited.

== History ==
=== Early years (1978–1981) ===
Venom were formed in Newcastle upon Tyne in 1978. The original personnel came from three different bands: Guillotine, Oberon and Dwarfstar. The original Guillotine featured Jeff "Mantas" Dunn and Dave Rutherford on guitars, Dean Hewitt on bass guitar, Dave Blackman on vocals, and Chris Mercater on drums who replaced Paul Burke, the original drummer when the band was founded. Blackman and Mercater were later also replaced by drummer Anthony Bray and vocalist Clive Archer. Later, Hewitt was replaced by Alan Winston on bass. In late 1978, Conrad Lant from Dwarfstar (also featuring Kevin "Ropa" Robson - bass, Graeme "Shamus" Newton - drums and vocalist Keith "Bod" Ballard) joined Guillotine replacing Dave Rutherford. Between Dwarfstar and Guillotine, Lant was in a short lived "futuristic metal cyberpunk" band called Album Graecum.

Lant later switched to bass after the departure of Winston. The band members took on new stage names. Archer became "Jesus Christ", Lant "Cronos", Bray "Abaddon", and Dunn "Mantas". The band name then changed in 1979 to Venom when a roadie suggested the name change.

At the beginning of their career, Venom were playing cover songs of Motörhead and Judas Priest. After Cronos joined, he introduced the subjects of the dark arts, and then often used "Satanic" lyrics and imagery. However, such references were mostly for shock value.

In late 1979, Lant introduced the band to his original artwork designs for the Venom logo and Satanic images, and he later created the artwork and designs used on the Venom record sleeves. He also introduced his original song ideas as he did not want to keep playing the same cover songs, and with Dunn he began writing new songs for the band. Lant had already composed songs like "Sons of Satan", "Bloodlust" and "Welcome to Hell", while Dunn had begun to compose songs like "Angel Dust", "Red Light Fever", "Buried Alive", "Raise the Dead" and "Live Like an Angel, Die Like a Devil", with Dunn providing the guitar and Cronos writing the lyrics. Dunn and Lant redefined together these songs with a mutual collaboration and then, after a few weeks, Lant recorded a rehearsal session on a basic cassette recorder which he played for the label he worked for, Neat Records, although as the band rehearsed in an old church hall the sound was not good. In April 1980, Lant was able to persuade the label to give him some free studio time and the band recorded a three-song demo. Soon after, six more tracks were recorded for just £50, with Lant singing on the song "Live Like an Angel". Archer then left the band, and Venom's line-up became a trio.

=== Classic line-up (1981–1986) ===
Venom's professional recording debut was the 1981 single "In League with Satan / Live Like an Angel", which was released by Neat Records. Later that year they released their full-length debut album, Welcome to Hell.

Welcome to Hell was a big influence on future thrash bands. Venom's music was faster and harsher than most heavy metal contemporaries and while Satanism and other dark topics had been featured in metal before, the subject had rarely been more prominent. Lant was quoted as saying that this celebration of evil subjects was inspired by the perceived need to outdo musicians like Ozzy Osbourne of Black Sabbath, who would "sing about evil things and dark figures, and then spoil it all by going: 'Oh, no, no, please, God, help me!'"

Their second album, 1982's Black Metal, is cited as perhaps the most important influence in the development of black metal, thrash metal, death metal, and other related styles that are often grouped under the extreme metal umbrella. Many defining elements of these genres are first found in the lyrics and song titles created by Lant, his unique singing style and larger than life presence. Venom's first two albums inspired cult followings to this day. While many of their new wave of British heavy metal peers (like Iron Maiden) had found measures of popular success or critical acclaim, or (like Def Leppard) were moving away from heavy metal towards hard rock, Venom were still regarded by critics as "a trio of buffoons".

In 1984, Venom released their third album At War with Satan, featuring an epic 20-minute title track, with substantial influences of many different musical styles, which took up the first side of the album. The title track, written by Lant, was a deliberate way for him to rebuff the critics who said Venom could not play. The B-side was focused on the rapid-fire, three-minute "scorchers" Venom were known for, including "Stand Up and Be Counted". A live video, The 7th Date of Hell Venom Live at Hammersmith Odeon, was also released that year. In 1985, Venom released their fourth studio album, Possessed, which was recorded in a stately home, and saw a band enjoying their success with different chefs being flown in every day during the album's recording, lavish parties of sex, drugs and rock n' roll. By this time Venom had released several singles ("Warhead", "Die Hard" and "Manitou" among others) and live EPs (The Assault Series including Canadian Assault, American Assault and French Assault). That same year, Venom toured with Slayer and Exodus on the Ultimate Revenge Tour.

Cronos believed Possessed to be underestimated: "I don't think there's any songs that are kind of overlooked, I just think some songs maybe weren't recorded as well as we could have recorded them. Like say for example on the Possessed album, I still think there are great songs."

During March and April 1986, Venom were supposed to record their fifth album, Deadline, but internal relationships began to deteriorate. A live album, Eine Kleine Nachtmusik, and a second live video, Alive in '85, were released in 1986. Dunn then left the band to release a solo album.

=== Temporary break-up and Tony Dolan era (1987–1995) ===
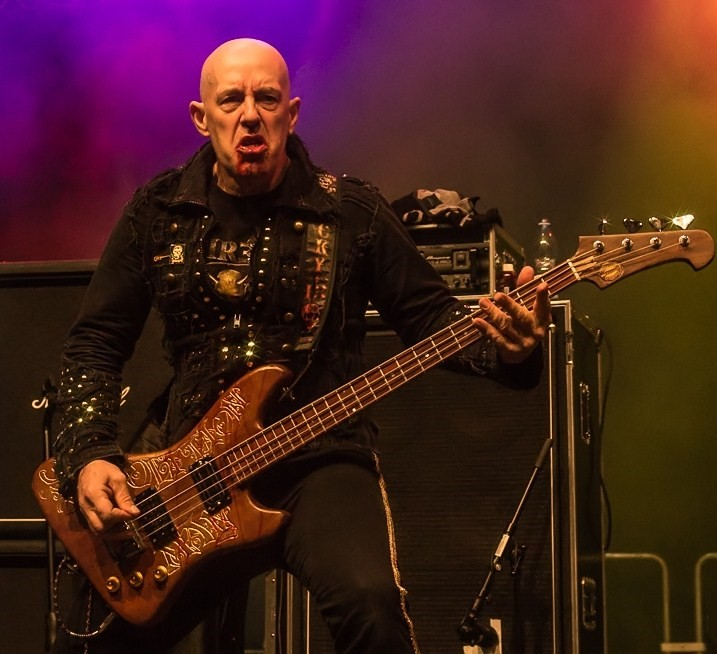
Tony "Demolition Man" Dolan (pictured in 2013) fronted the band from 1988 to 1992.

Two guitarists, Mike Hickey and Jim Clare, were hired to replace Dunn. Their fifth album, 1987's Calm Before the Storm, moved away from Satanic themes in favour of "sword and sorcery" material. This was a new direction for Venom, although it did not last long, with only a short Japanese and Brazilian tour in 1986, so the band decided to split, and Lant, Clare and Hickey all left to form Lant's solo band, Cronos.

Bray was left as the only group member, but he was able to convince Music for Nations for a deal to release a new Venom album on the Under One Flag label, using Deadline demo tracks which were recorded with previous line-ups but never released. In 1988, Bray offered a vocals/bass role to Tony Dolan (The Demolition Man) from Atomkraft. Bray and Dolan wrote new material prior to Dunn's rejoining the band along with rhythm guitarist Al Barnes. Together they recorded Prime Evil (1989), the EP Tear Your Soul Apart (1990) and Temples of Ice (1991). Barnes then left the band, and Steve White from Atomkraft was hired as his replacement. They released The Waste Lands in 1992, also without success. Music for Nations refused to release any more Venom albums, so Dolan and Dunn quit, effectively disbanding Venom. Bray continued to release compilation and live albums up to 1995. Nonetheless, Dolan, Dunn and Bray continued performing as a trio.

=== Reunion, death of Cronos and disbandment (1995–2026) ===
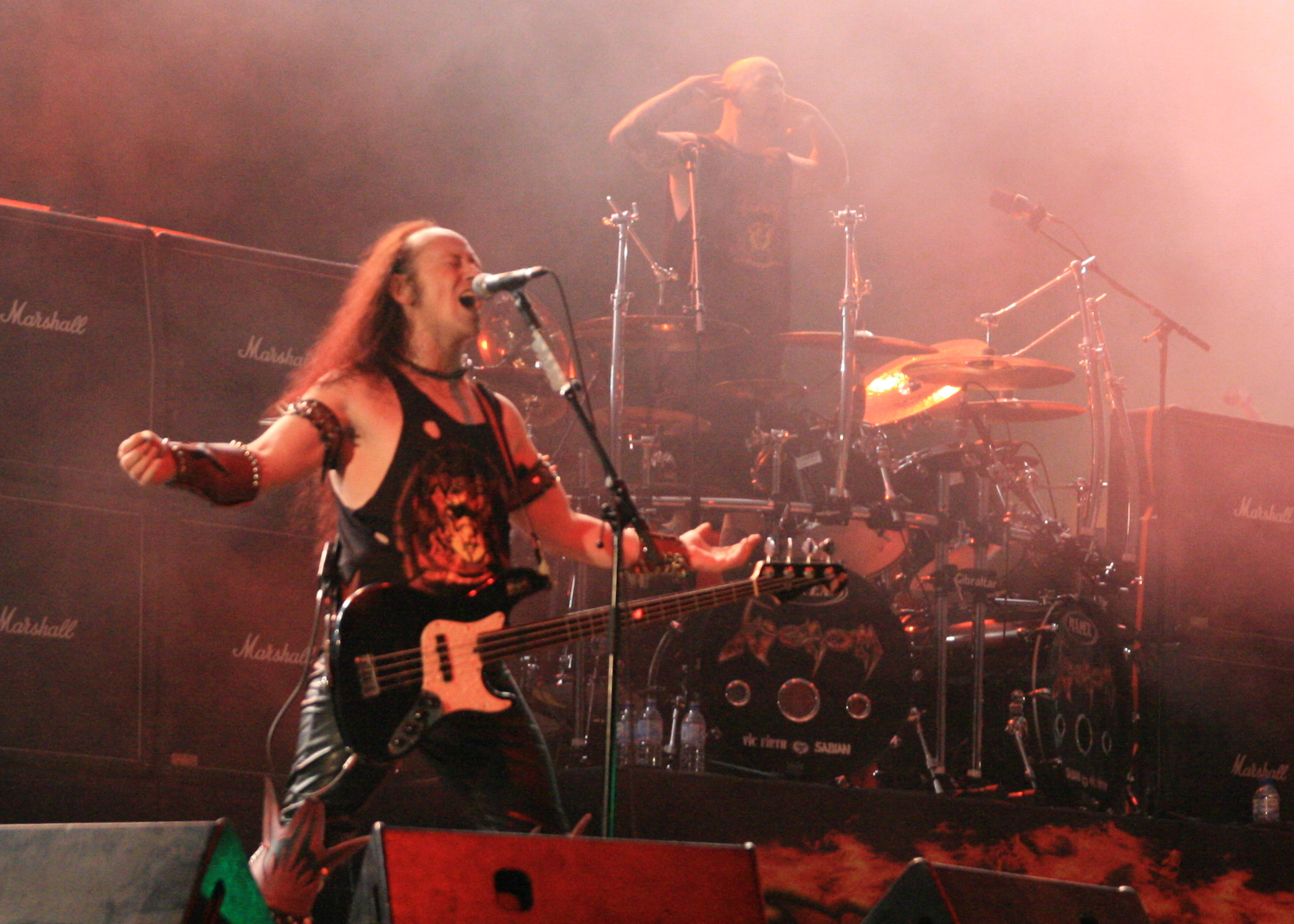
Venom at Hellfest 2008

In 1995, Lant, Dunn and Bray reunited the "classic" line-up, beginning by headlining the Waldrock Festival on 24 June 1995. They recorded and self-released the Venom '96 EP with four re-recorded old tracks and one new song, resulting in a record deal with the SPV label. Following this was a live CD/video box set, The Second Coming, composed entirely of songs from their classic era such as "Welcome to Hell", "Countess Bathory", "In Nomine Satanas" and "Black Metal". An album, Cast in Stone, was next released in 1997, split between two discs which was one of all new material and the other with re-recordings of popular early-1980s songs.

By 1999, internal conflicts in the band delayed production of the second album in their deal with SPV. Band manager Eric Cook and Abaddon decided not to work with Cronos again. Abaddon wrote a letter to Cronos, with the intent of firing him. In response, Cronos communicated the situation to SPV. The record company refused to work with Venom if Cronos was not part of the line-up. Cronos answered Abaddon telling him: "You can't kick the Devil out of hell, I'm firing you!" Despite this, the band tried to invite Abaddon to play with them again but Bray did not want to perform on the album and he was replaced by Conrad Lant's younger brother, Anton. This line-up released Resurrection in 2000 on SPV. However, in 2002 Dunn was next to leave the group and Lant replaced him with an American guitarist, Mike Hickey, who had already taken part in the 1987 release, Calm Before the Storm, and Cronos solo albums. In late 2005, Venom released a career-spanning four-disc box set, MMV, which includes an exclusive mini-poster of the band's seven-date tour of Europe with Metallica and a 60-page picture book, with interviews and pictures. The set includes all their best-known songs, along with rarities like live tracks, demos and outtakes. This line-up of the band released the Metal Black album in 2006.

In 2007, Mike Hickey left the band and guitarist Stuart "Rage" Dixon joined the band and this line-up released the record Hell the following year. In 2009, drummer Danny "Dante" Needham joined the band and Lant wrote that this would be known as "The Epic Line-Up of Venom", and they set off on a full South American tour. After headlining festivals around the world for the next couple of years gaining in popularity, they released the Fallen Angels album on 28 November 2011.

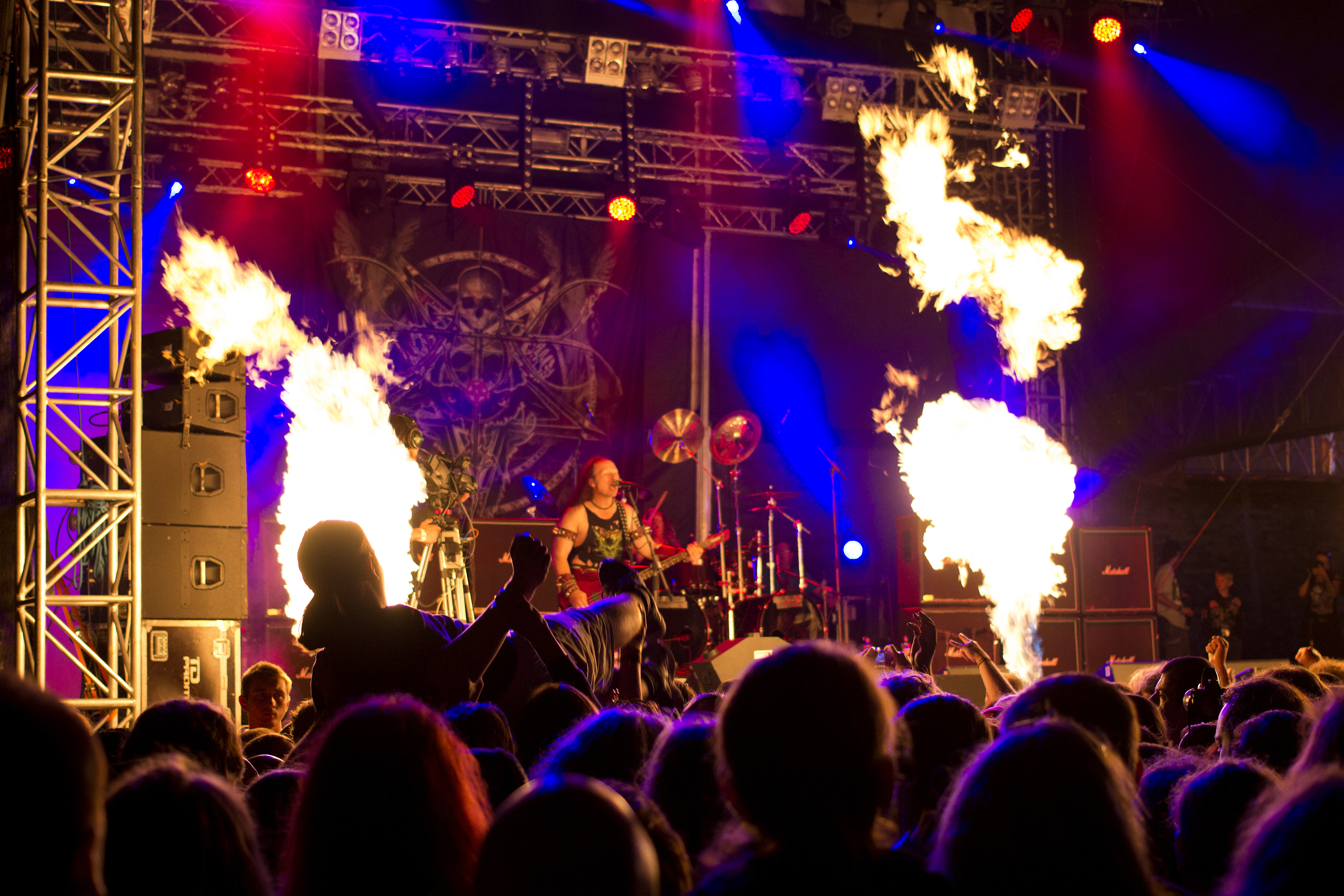
Venom perform at Brutal Assault 2014

Venom released their fourteenth studio album, From the Very Depths, on 27 January 2015. The band also played one song, "Rise", they were working on in the studio, live for the audience at Rockfest 2014.

Venom released a three-track EP, 100 Miles to Hell, on 22 December 2017. Their fifteenth album, Storm the Gates, was released on 14 December 2018.

Venom's sixteenth and final studio album, and their first in eight years, Into Oblivion, was released on 1 May 2026. The album's lead single, "Lay Down Your Soul", was released on 5 March 2026.

On 1 October 2026, Cronos' bandmates Rage and Danté and his son Nathan announced on social media that he had died at the age of 63. No cause of death has yet been announced. A few days after his death, Rage and Danté confirmed that Venom had disbanded.

==== Venom Inc. ====
In April 2015, in anticipation of a date of M-pire of Evil (band of Mantas and Demolition Man) at the Keep It True Festival in Germany, the organisers of the festival asked Mantas and Demolition Man if they could play the songs of Venom with Abaddon. Mantas had not talked to Abaddon since 1998. After thinking a bit, the two former Venom members played along with Abaddon without having done any rehearsals for the show. At this point, the three brought together the Venom line-up of 1988–1992 under the name of Venom Inc. for the sake of the fans (instead of the name "Iron & Steel", that was initially conceived by the members themselves). Abaddon was eventually replaced in 2018, while Mantas was out of the band by late 2024. Venom Inc. have released two studio albums to date: Avé (2017) and There's Only Black (2022).

== Artistry ==
=== Musical style and influences ===
Venom were one of the first incarnations of extreme metal, influencing many thrash metal, black metal, death metal, and other extreme metal bands. They are considered one of the premier influences on black metal, and their 1982 album Black Metal gave the genre its name. Venom's exact genre has been a topic of debate. They have been labelled various genres by the press, most prominently thrash and speed metal. Cronos insisted on calling it black metal, without passing judgment on the genre that later would flourish in Norway:

...It's one of the things when I first saw when I saw the Norwegian scene beginning in the early nineties. I thought: ok, I know they said Venom are an influence, etcetera, etcetera; let's see where these guys are coming from. And then when I started to read the lyrics, read the interviews and see they were kind of saying the same thing, but about their country, they had their religion, with all the Norse gods like Wodan and Thor. And then all of the sudden the Christians came in and they tried to destroy their religion. It's great that they stayed within in their country's beliefs for their lyrics as well. So, they're not the exactly the same things as Venom, they invented something of their own, which I think is fucking great...

Prime influences of Venom were Black Sabbath, Judas Priest, Motörhead, the Sex Pistols, Alice Cooper, and Kiss. Other musicians or bands that have influenced Venom are Rush, Deep Purple, the Who, the Tubes, Van Halen, the Rolling Stones, and Elvis Presley.

== Legacy and influence ==
In 2004, Guitar World wrote that "thrash and black metalists certainly owe a debt to Mantas and his group, Venom, for arguably (though unwittingly) helping invent both thrash and black metal. On amusingly offensive records like Welcome to Hell, Venom's 1981 debut, Mantas can be heard sawing away diabolically out of his slightly out-of-tune ax". Welcome to Hell influenced several later bands. Venom's music helped shape the development of thrash metal bands, including the "Big Four" (Metallica, Slayer, Anthrax, and Megadeth) who in turn were influential, in addition to the scenes of the Bay Area (including Exodus and Testament) and Germany (including Kreator, Destruction and Sodom). Venom have also been acknowledged outside of metal circles; the band received a notable shout-out from the Beastie Boys on their 1998 album Hello Nasty, reflecting their broader cultural impact beyond the heavy metal genre. Metallica opened for Venom on an early 1980s tour, Venom opened for Metallica and Slayer on the Ride the Lightning tour, and Slayer played with them and Exodus on the Combat Tour in 1985. Both Kerry King and Tom Araya have cited Venom as an important early influence on Slayer's image and music, while Dave Mustaine of Megadeth said he and James Hetfield of Metallica were fans of Venom. Lars Ulrich of Metallica said of Venom's first album: "Welcome To Hell was a classic! Black metal, speed metal, death metal, whatever you want to call it, Venom started it all with that one record!" Mille Petrozza of Kreator stated that Venom was one of his favourite bands early in his career, alongside the "Big Four". Canadian band Voivod covered seven different Venom songs on their early demos.

Venom would also be of importance to the black metal scene and the early death metal scene. Swiss band Hellhammer (later to become Celtic Frost) and Norwegian band Mayhem are among the acts influenced by Venom; Quorthon, the frontman of Swedish band Bathory, called Black Metal "one of the best albums ever made" in an interview, although he downplayed Venom's influence on him. Possessed and Repulsion, two bands which went on to influence much of the death metal and grindcore to come, were both influenced by Venom, with Jeff Becerra of Possessed often asserting Venom and Exodus as the two main influences on his band. Music critic Bradley Torreano wrote that Venom "caught the attention of both metalheads and punks, the band was emulated by the former and turned into camp icons by the latter." Henry Rollins once compared the band to Spinal Tap.

Although they did not make it to MTV's top 10 heavy metal bands list, they were given an "honorable mention". In 2016, the staff of Loudwire named them the 29th-best metal band of all time.

Reflecting on Venom's 40th anniversary, Cronos said that without Venom, bands such as Metallica or Slayer would not exist. He explained, "We were the band that was influenced by Motörhead and the Sex Pistols, but we took their sound and made something completely new out of it. We were completely new; no one had heard anything like us. And of course, unbeknown to us, in America there were these kids who were listening to our records and then shaping what we were doing into their own thing. Slayer would be an example of that. And I agree, without us those bands either wouldn't exist, or would sound very different from the way they do." He also cited the line-up consisting of himself, along with guitarist Stuart "Rage" Dixon and drummer Danny "Danté" Needham as "the best one we've ever had."

Critic Eduardo Rivadavia of AllMusic writes that even though Welcome to Hell influenced "literally thousands" of bands, Venom were "critically reviled". Critic James Christopher Monger, however, declares that the members of Venom "grew as musicians" as their careers progressed. Ethnographer Keith Kahn-Harris argues that Venom's limited technical skill, particularly early in their career, was a profound, though inadvertent factor in the band's influence: being unable to mimic more technically proficient metal of their predecessors or peers, Venom instead opted to focus on sheer speed, creating music that was inspired by earlier metal, yet simultaneously innovative.

== Controversy ==
A Venom song was included in the so-called "Filthy Fifteen" list compiled by the Parents Music Resource Center (PMRC) during 1980s hearings on musical content. The title track from the Possessed album was criticised by the PMRC for having "occult" lyrical content. The efforts by the PMRC resulted in the inclusion of Parental Advisory labels that became ubiquitous on physical music media.

Venom's biggest criticism is regarding Satanism, which is the main driving force behind the band's music and album covers. Cronos explained in 2008 that the reasoning behind it is for entertainment purposes.

I've always been interested in Satanism, but we're entertainers, and we used subjects like Satanism and paganism to entertain people, like horror movies do. Listening to a Venom album is the same thing as watching an Evil Dead movie. I don't go around murdering virgins in my spare time. It's frustrating when people can't make that distinction; I mean, David Bowie's not actually from Mars, is he? But we were always being misquoted in the press. Venom admit to dancing around a campfire with virgins? Nonsense.

— Cronos

== Band members ==
Final line-up

- Conrad "Cronos" Lant – bass (1979–1988, 1995–2026), rhythm guitar (1979), backing vocals (1979–1980), lead vocals (1980–1988, 1995–2026)
- Stuart "Rage" Dixon – guitars, backing vocals (2007–2026)
- Danny "Dante" Needham – drums, backing vocals (2009–2026)

== Discography ==
Studio albums

- Welcome to Hell (1981)
- Black Metal (1982)
- At War with Satan (1984)
- Possessed (1985)
- Calm Before the Storm (1987)
- Prime Evil (1989)
- Temples of Ice (1991)
- The Waste Lands (1992)
- Cast in Stone (1997)
- Resurrection (2000)
- Metal Black (2006)
- Hell (2008)
- Fallen Angels (2011)
- From the Very Depths (2015)
- Storm the Gates (2018)
- Into Oblivion (2026)

EPs

- Canadian Assault (Canada 1984)
- American Assault (USA 1985)
- French Assault (France 1985)
- Scandinavian Assault (Sweden 1985)
- German Assault (Germany 1985)
- Japanese Assault (Japan 1985)
- Hell at Hammersmith (UK 1985)
- Tear Your Soul Apart (1990)
- Venom '96 (UK 1996)
- 100 Miles to Hell (UK 2017)

Live albums

- Official Bootleg (1985)
- Eine kleine Nachtmusik (1986)
- The Second Coming (1996)
- Witching Hour (2003)
- Live from the Hammersmith Odeon Theater (2017)

UK singles

- In League with Satan / Live Like an Angel (1981)
- Bloodlust (1982)
- Die Hard (1983) UK No. 156
- Warhead (1984) UK No. 134
- Manitou (1984) UK No. 128
- Nightmare (1985) UK No. 123
- Antechrist (2006)
- Hammerhead (2011)

Compilation albums

- From Hell to the Unknown... (1985)
- The Singles 80-86 (1986)
- Acid Queen (1991)
- In Memorium (1991)
- The Book of Armageddon (1992)
- Kissing the Beast (1993)
- Leave Me in Hell (1993)
- Skeletons in the Closet (1993)
- New, Live and Rare (1998)
- Old, New, Borrowed and Blue (1999)
- Buried Alive (1999)
- From Heaven to the Unknown (1999)
- The Venom Archive (2001)
- Lay Down your Soul! (2002)
- In League with Satan (2003)
- The Seven Gates of Hell - The Singles 1980-1985 (2003)
- Sons of Satan - Rare and Unreleased (2020)

Box sets

- Here Lies Venom (1985)
- Triple Dose of Venom (2001)
- MMV (2005)
- Assault! (2017)
- In Nomine Satanas (2019)

== See also ==
- List of new wave of British heavy metal bands
