= Cast in Stone =

Studio album by Venom
- Released: 11 November 1997
- Genre: Heavy metal; thrash metal
- Length: 54:36
- Label: SPV/Steamhammer

Venom chronology
The Waste Lands (1992)	Cast in Stone (1997)	Resurrection (2000)

Expanded Edition cover

Professional ratings
Review scores
Source	Rating
About.com	4/5 stars
Vox	3/5 stars

Cast in Stone is the ninth album by British heavy metal band Venom, and their first album in 12 years to feature the original lineup. Recorded at Lartington Hall Studios near Barnard Castle, it was released on SPV/Steamhammer in 1997. It is the last Venom album to feature Abaddon on drums.

Like the previous two albums, ex-Child's Play and then-current Motörhead producer Howard Benson was originally in talks to produce the album, with band frontman Cronos wanting the album to have a similar production to Motörhead's 1995 album Sacrifice. However, once again, Benson was unavailable.

== Critical reception ==
"Cast in Stone is heavier than Metallica and more tuneful than Pantera", according to Vox. "A surprisingly listenable album that's maybe more old school metal than thrash, but aims a swift kick between the legs and truly delivers", concluded reviewer Jerry Ewing, giving the album three stars out of five.

Metal Hammer included the album cover on their list of "50 most hilariously ugly rock and metal album covers ever".

== Track listing ==
No.	Title	Length
1.	"The Evil One"	3:18
2.	"Raised in Hell"	2:47
3.	"All Devils Eve"	2:53
4.	"Bleeding"	2:43
5.	"Destroyed & Damned"	6:45
6.	"Domus Mundi"	3:51
7.	"Flight of the Hydra"	3:22
8.	"God's Forsaken"	4:24
9.	"Mortals"	3:15
10.	"Infectious"	3:36
11.	"Kings of Evil"	4:15
12.	"You're All Gonna Die"	3:02
13.	"Judgement Day"	4:32
14.	"Swarm"	5:06

== Credits ==
- Cronos – bass, vocals
- Mantas – guitars
- Abaddon – drums, samples
