= Possessed (Venom album) =

Studio album by Venom
- Released: 1 April 1985
- Recorded: Early 1985
- Venue: Moorhall, Sussex, England
- Studio: The Manor Mobile
- Genre: Heavy metal; speed metal; black metal
- Length: 42:57
- Label: Neat
- Producer: Venom, Keith Nichol

Venom chronology
At War with Satan (1984)	Possessed (1985)	Eine kleine Nachtmusik (1986)

Professional ratings
Review scores
Source	Rating
AllMusic	3/5 stars
Collector's Guide to Heavy Metal	5/10
Metal Forces	8/10

Possessed is the fourth studio album by English heavy metal band Venom, released in April 1985. It is the band's last studio album to feature guitarist Jeffrey Dunn before his first departure from the band in 1986. At the time of its release, it received mixed reviews, even from critics who had liked Venom's earlier albums; Possessed was thought to be in another league as compared to the band's earlier works, even though much of the material on Possessed was written before the release of its predecessor, At War with Satan. It was the first Venom album recorded outside of Impulse Studios. The song "Possessed" is ranked No. 14 on the Parents Music Resource Center's "Filthy Fifteen", a list of the 15 songs the group found to be most objectionable.

The boy on the cover is the son of the band's drummer, Abaddon. The girl is the niece of producer Keith Nichol.

== Track listing ==
All tracks are written by Cronos and Mantas, except for where noted.

Side one
No.	Title	Length
1.	"Powerdrive"	3:14
2.	"Flytrap"	3:50
3.	"Satanachist"	2:43
4.	"Burn This Place (To the Ground)"	2:42
5.	"Harmony Dies"	2:42
6.	"Possessed"	4:52

Side two
No.	Title	Length
7.	"Hellchild"	2:40
8.	"Moonshine"	3:19
9.	"Wing and a Prayer"	2:47
10.	"Suffer Not the Children"	3:07
11.	"Voyeur"	3:01
12.	"Mystique"	4:58
13.	"Too Loud (For the Crowd)"	3:02

2002 Castle Music/Sanctuary Records Group bonus tracks
No.	Title	Length
14.	"Nightmare (12" mix)"	3:54
15.	"F.O.A.D. (12" B-side)"	3:05
16.	"Warhead (12" B-side)"	3:41
17.	"Possessed (remix)"	5:14
18.	"Witching Hour (live)"	4:17
19.	"Teacher's Pet/Poison/Teacher's Pet (live)"	7:59

== Personnel ==
Venom

- Cronos – vocals, bass
- Mantas – guitar
- Abaddon – drums

Production

- Keith Nichol – producer, engineer
- S. Nichols, Mark Ammasmifff – engineers

== Charts ==
Chart (1985)	Peak position
UK Albums (OCC)	99
