= Black Metal (Venom album) =

Studio album by Venom
- Released: 1 November 1982
- Recorded: 1982
- Studios: Impulse Studios, Wallsend
- Genres: Speed metal; heavy metal; black metal
- Length: 38:50
- Label: Neat
- Producers: Keith Nichol and Venom

Venom chronology
Welcome to Hell (1981)	Black Metal (1982)	At War with Satan (1984)

Black Metal is the second studio album by English heavy metal band Venom, released on 1 November 1982 through Neat Records. Released during the new wave of British heavy metal, the album is considered to be a major influence on the speed metal, thrash metal, death metal and black metal scenes that emerged in the 1980s and early 1990s.

The album lent its name to the black metal subgenre, but its music was an early form of extreme metal which still had roots in traditional heavy metal. AllMusic described it as "sowing the seeds of much that would be referred to as extreme metal", and Moynihan & Søderlind in their book Lords of Chaos affirmed that the album "carved in stone some of [black metal's] essential features". Nevertheless, its lyrics and imagery were a major influence on the early Norwegian black metal scene.

== Background and recording ==
After the release and general positive reception to the band's debut album, Venom performed a series of successful shows in Europe and the United States, building a fan base. After a year of touring, they returned to the studio to record a follow-up effort. The band credits an improved sense of its own identity and vocalist and bassist Conrad "Cronos" Lant's increased experience as a studio engineer for the new album's heavier, more distinctive sound.

As with most of Venom's early material, much of the writing was left to Lant and Dunn. Two of the songs on the album, "Buried Alive" and "Raise the Dead", were written in the late 1970s and were originally intended to be on the band's debut album; however, the band felt that they were unable to do the songs justice at the time of those demo recordings. Early versions of these songs can be heard on the band's 1979 Church Hall rehearsals recording, with original vocalist Clive Archer. "Buried Alive" was originally less than a minute long, and the remainder of what would be the rest of the song was used as the first half of "Raise the Dead" but with different lyrics. The band decided to rework these two songs with the final recording having "Buried Alive" extended and the ending transitioning into "Raise the Dead". With Lant's experience in the studio he took a very hands on approach with recording "Buried Alive". For the intro of song, the band was looking to mimic the sound of earth being shovelled onto a coffin during a burial service while a priest delivers a prayer, but they failed to capture the sound they were looking for by cutting cabbages. So they decided to bring in a cardboard box and mud, then put microphones in the box and used spades to shovel the mud into the box onto the microphones.

The title track, an ode to the extreme metal genre, opens with the sounds of a chainsaw which the band created by clamping down some large steel plates and then brought in a real chainsaw into the studio which they used on the steel plates to create the sawing sound effect. In the process, Lant stated that all of the saw's teeth broke in trying to achieve this effect. Another song on the album, "Countess Bathory", was written when "Abaddon" was late for a session, so Dunn began jamming some new riffs while Lant would work the lyrics out. The band's roadie came in the room and began drumming for them, and soon after "Abaddon" would come in and tried to make up a new drum pattern, but Lant and Dunn felt the roadie's drum pattern worked best. Lant also explained the origin of the song's opening riff, saying that it was inspired by the opening theme song of the children's show The Magic Roundabout. The opening riff would then purportedly go on to influence the main riff of Nirvana's "Smells Like Teen Spirit".

The final track on the album is a preview of the title track for what was to be the band's third album, At War with Satan. A concept album that Lant started working on originally when he was still in school that tells the story of the battle between Heaven and Hell and with the latter coming out on top. Lant thought it would be interesting to put a teaser at the end of the record as a warning to fans of what was to come. The album was recorded in just 7 days, with Lant working long hours recording alongside the studio engineer and then mixing the tracks on his own.

== Music and lyrics ==
The album's tracks have been described as being composed of "speed, catchy speed, rhythmic explosions and cutting riffs", as well as being characterised by "a rough low-budget production like a gig in the cellar". Much like Welcome to Hell, Black Metal also maintains a very unpolished and raw sound due to the label's time constraints as well as Lant's desire to get the "heaviest sound I could get" on tape. Lant said, "We knew that together we had an original sound, the unholy din that came at you when we kicked into a track was truly tremendous, trying to get this mayhem down onto tape in a studio was another matter, I tried my best with all of the skills I had learned as a studio engineer, I just went for the heaviest sound I could get, I mean there was no way I was ever going to make Venom sound like Lynyrd Skynyrd now was there? It was pure mayhem from start to finish."

Lyrically, the band continued to explore Satanic themes ("To Hell and Back", "Leave Me in Hell", "Sacrifice", "Heaven's on Fire") and witchcraft ("Don't Burn the Witch"). Other themes explored on the album include nightmare scenarios ("Buried Alive", "Raise the Dead"), horror mythology ("Countess Bathory") and adolescent sexual fantasies ("Teacher's Pet").

== Artwork ==
Early copy of Black Metal with the title written in black on black relief.

The album's cover artwork is said to be "synonymous" with the band. It was designed by Cronos in black and white, and was originally done in Tipp-Ex. It depicts the face of a demon with a pentacle on its forehead. An inverted cross is on the left horn and the inscription 666 on the right horn. Above the head of the demon's face is the band's wordmark logo reading "Venom" and the album title at the bottom in gothic characters separated by the bottom of the demon's face with the word "BLACK" on the left and "METAL" on the right. On early copies of the album the title was written in black on black in relief, therefore only observable against the light, while the following prints have the title written in white characters. On the back of the cover there is also an apparent anti-piracy icon with the inscription: "Home Taping Is Killing Music … So Are Venom".

== Release and promotion ==
The album was released on 1 November 1982 by Neat Records in the United Kingdom and by Combat Records in the United States. Included with the first album prints was an insert with the lyrics of the songs in gothic characters and a mini-poster in black and white depicting the members of the group. "Mantas" is portrayed posing next to a motorcycle with a wall of Marshall amplifiers in the background; "Abaddon" is locked up behind the rusted steel bars of a secret-style cell in a medieval castle; and "Cronos", armed with a ritual dagger, is kept on a leash by a woman who is wearing a leather jacket but is naked from the waist down. The Neat Records label on the second side of the original vinyl had color variations of silver, blue, green and red.

Jonathan "Jonny Z" Zazula, a small time importer from New York, concert promoter and co-founder of Megaforce Records, ordered several boxes of Welcome to Hell from Neat Records to sell at his record stall in a shopping mall. Soon after "Jonny Z" ordered more and asked Neat if Venom were interested in doing shows in the States. The band wasn't sure how they would get their pyros to put on a proper show to the States as well as trying to find an opening act, however, an importer friend of Lants showed him a bootlegged video of a new band from San Francisco where the guitarist was wearing a Venom shirt, Metallica. Venom played two shows at the Staten Island Paramount Theatre with Metallica opening for them on 22 and 24 April. On the second night, considerable damage was done to the venue when explosives and a fireball from the pyrotechnics created a four-foot hole in the stage and the fireball shot across the building coming to rest in the upper balcony. Lant had also dealt several blows to his own speakers, destroying his stacks. When the technician assessed the damage done, the total cost for repairs amounted to "666" dollars. After successful shows in the States Venom was already planning their return to America before they had even left.

The band returned to Europe and was set to headline Aardschokdag, an annual heavy metal festival held in the Netherlands, in June 1983. However, their equipment had been impounded by U.S. Customs in New York following their shows with Metallica in April. As a result, the band was forced to withdraw from the festival and also had to cancel their planned European tour. Venom was replaced by Accept, but still decided to show up to Aardschokdag and signed autographs stage side and also went onstage before Accept began their set to apologise to the 9000 fans for not being able to perform. Although they didn't play, they still received one of the largest receptions of the night. With no tour and plenty of time to spare, Venom and manager Eric Cook decided to embark on a promotional tour in France where the band was interviewed on Metal radio shows and participated in in-store autograph sessions.

== Reception and legacy ==
Professional ratings
Review scores
Source	Rating
AllMusic	4.5/5 stars
Collector's Guide to Heavy Metal	8/10
Sounds	5/5 stars

The album was released to acclaim from critics, and has since gone on to be recognised as one of the most influential metal albums ever released. Sounds, much like in their 1981 review of Welcome to Hell, gave a five-star review of Black Metal. Eduardo Rivadavia of AllMusic gave the album 4.5 out of 5 stars, and points to the title track, "Raise the Dead" and "Acid Queen" as "proto-thrashing classics", "Leave Me in Hell" as "surprisingly complex", "Teacher's Pet" as "unusually goofy" and "Bloodlust" and "Countess Bathory" as "absolute classics"; he concluded that "Black Metal is right up there with its predecessor". Martin Popoff of Collector's Guide to Heavy Metal gave the album eight out of a possible 10 stars in his November 2005 review.

Robert Dimery included the album in his book 1001 Albums You Must Hear Before You Die. Dimery wrote that Black Metal is the "perfect parody", which had "shocked many critics and parents... Only few could have imagined that this would create a 'true dark subculture'". In 1998, it was voted 52nd among the "100 Albums You Must Hear Before You Die" by readers of British magazine Kerrang!.

Kerrang wrote, "Almost 40 years on, black metal as a genre may be at times unrecognizable, but this remains the powerful seed from which all of it grew." Numerous artists have cited Black Metal as a major influence on them, spawning many cover songs from the album by bands including Dimmu Borgir, Mayhem, Blitzkrieg, and Cradle of Filth. Drummer Jonas Åkerlund, of Swedish extreme metal band Bathory, cites the track "Countess Bathory" as the inspiration for the band's name. Pantera vocalist Phil Anselmo has the band's wordmark and demon face tattooed on his lower back. He also lists Black Metal as one of his "five essential metal albums". Anselmo stated: "I first bought the album for the cover alone, but the music and the words got me. I'd never heard a band sing about basic Satanism in such a pure, direct way. There's nothing tricky about what they do, and that's why they're great. They nail it."

In 2013, Decibel ranked Black Metal at number five on its list of the Top 100 Black Metal Albums of All Time. In 2018, Revolver included the album in their list of "25 Essential Black-Metal Albums," and wrote: "Not only did this faux-Satanic British power-trio’s second album coin the name of a new genre; it also inspired an ultra-violent, nihilistic ideology that inspired the band’s Norwegian successors to burn churches and commit murder. The irony, of course, is that Venom were totally kidding."

== Track listing ==
All tracks are written by Venom (Anthony Bray, Jeffery Dunn, and Conrad Lant).

Side A ("Black")
No.	Title	Length
1.	"Black Metal"	3:40
2.	"To Hell and Back"	3:00
3.	"Buried Alive"	4:16
4.	"Raise the Dead"	2:45
5.	"Teacher's Pet"	4:41

Side B ("Metal")
No.	Title	Length
6.	"Leave Me in Hell"	3:33
7.	"Sacrifice"	4:27
8.	"Heaven's on Fire"	3:40
9.	"Countess Bathory"	3:44
10.	"Don't Burn the Witch"	3:20
11.	"At War with Satan (Preview)"	2:14

Bonus tracks on 2002 CD reissue
No.	Title	Length
12.	"Bursting Out (60 Min+ Version)"	2:58
13.	"Black Metal (Radio One Session)"	3:08
14.	"Nightmare (Radio One Session)"	3:27
15.	"Too Loud for the Crowd (Radio One Session)"	2:09
16.	"Bloodlust (Radio One Session)"	2:44
17.	"Die Hard (12" Version)"	3:06
18.	"Acid Queen (12" Version)"	2:31
19.	"Bursting Out (12" Version)"	2:59
20.	"Hounds of Hell (Outtake)"	3:20

Bonus tracks on 2009 remastered edition
No.	Title	Length
21.	"Bloodlust (7" Single A-Side, NEAT 13)"	2:59
22.	"In Nomine Satanas (7" Single B-Side, NEAT 13)"	3:26

== Personnel ==
- Conrad "Cronos" Lant – bass, vocals, artwork
- Jeffrey "Mantas" Dunn – guitars
- Anthony "Abaddon" Bray – drums
- Keith Nichol – production, engineering

== Covers ==
- Aura Noir covered "Heaven's on Fire" on their album "Black Thrash Attack".
- Alchemist covered "Black Metal" for a tribute album.
- Blitzkrieg covered "Countess Bathory" on their album Unholy Trinity.
- Cradle of Filth covered the song "Black Metal" on the special edition of their album Cruelty and the Beast.
- Dark Forest, a black metal band from Brazil, covered the song "Black Metal" on their demo Sodomized by Depraved Goat from 2003.
- Dimmu Borgir covered the song "Black Metal", as the Japanese version bonus track on their album In Sorte Diaboli.
- Heidenland covered "Black Metal" as a hidden track on the 1999 demo cassette Triomftocht voor de glorie van Wodan.
- Hypocrisy did a cover of the song "Black Metal" on the album Osculum Obscenum.
- Isegrim made a cover album called A Tribute to Venom.
- Macabre covered "Countess Bathory" on Grim Scary Tales.
- Machetazo covered "Black Metal"; it appears on their compilation Ultratumba.
- Mayhem, whose guitarist and bandleader Euronymous hailed Venom as an important black metal band, covered "Black Metal" on their Pure Fucking Armageddon demo.
- Messiah Marcolin did a cover of "Countess Bathory".
- Necrodeath made a cover of "Countess Bathory" on their album Draculea released in 2007.
- Obituary covered "Buried Alive" for their greatest hits compilation, entitled Anthology.
- Sigh covered multiple songs off of this album (as well as other Venom albums) on To Hell and Back: Sigh's Tribute to Venom in 1995, and on A Tribute to Venom in 2008, along with other EPs and splits.
- The Soft Pink Truth, Drew Daniel of Matmos' house side project, covered the title track on his 2014 record Why Do The Heathen Rage?
- Unleashed covered "Countess Bathory" on Shadows in the Deep.
- Vader covered "Black Metal" on their album Necropolis.
- Macabre covered "Countess Bathory" for their album Grim Scary Tales.
- Warpath covered "Black Metal" for their album When War Begins.
- Kazjurol covered "Countess Bathory" for their EP Body Slam.
- Sodom covered "Angel Dust" & "1,000 Days in Sodom" both on their release entitled Ten Black Years - Best of CD on Disc 2
