= Conrad Lant =

British metal vocalist and bassist (1963–2026)

Cronos
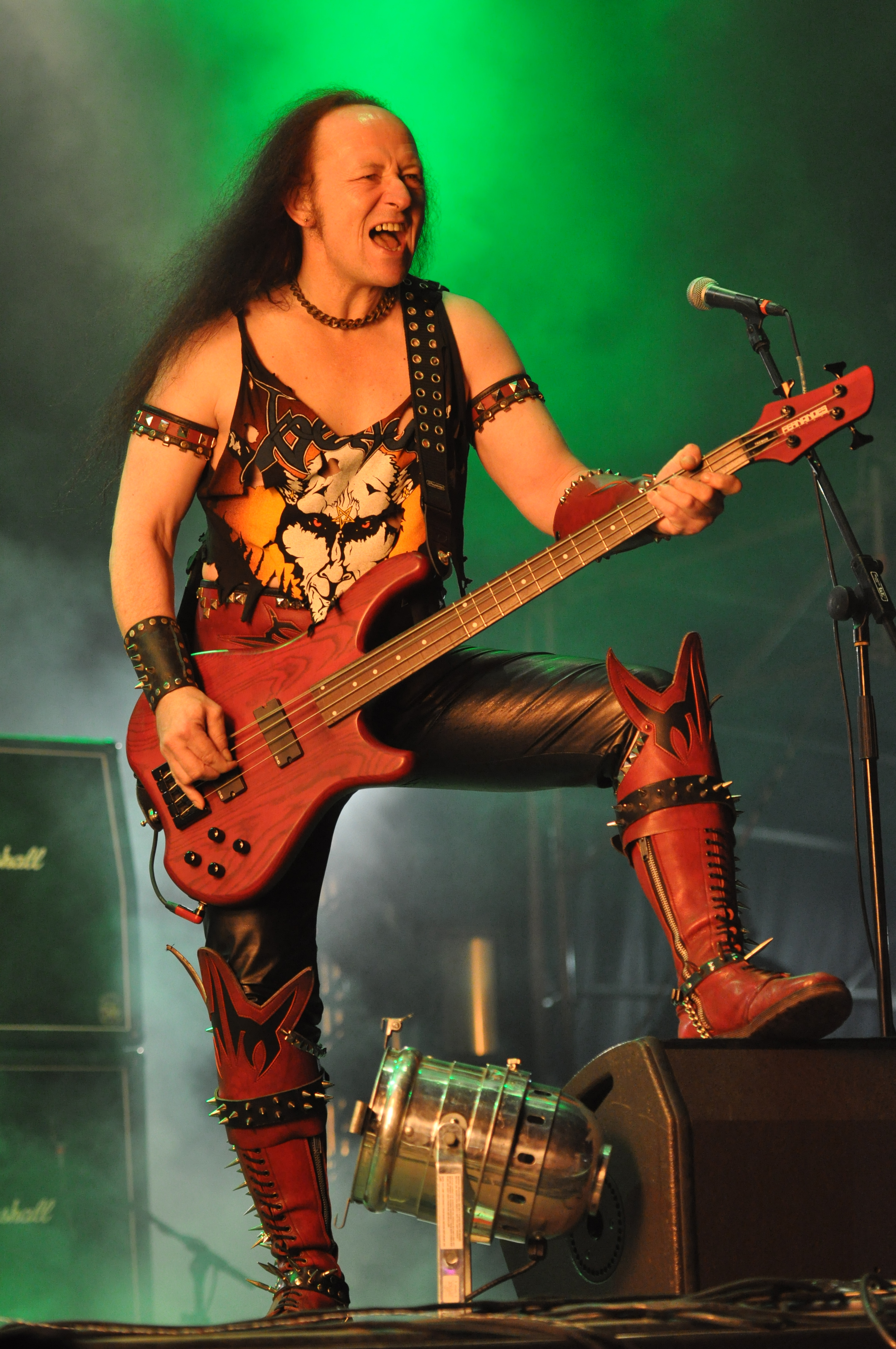
- Cronos performing with Venom in 2013

Background information
- Born: Conrad Thomas Lant; 15 January 1963; Chelsea, London, England
- Origin: Newcastle, England
- Died: 25 September 2026 (aged 63)
- Genres: Heavy metal; speed metal; thrash metal; first-wave black metal
- Occupations: Musician; songwriter
- Instruments: Vocals; bass
- Years active: 1979–2026
- Formerly of: Venom; Cronos
- Website: venomslegions.com

Conrad Thomas Lant (15 January 1963 – 25 September 2026), best known by his stage name Cronos, was an English musician. He was the vocalist, bassist and a founding member of the heavy metal band Venom.

== Early life ==
Conrad Thomas Lant was born in Chelsea, London, on 15 January 1963. His family moved to Newcastle when he was seven years old.

== Career ==
=== Early years and Venom ===
After playing in a couple of high school bands—Dwarfstar (also featuring bassist Kevin "Ropa" Robson, drummer Graeme "Shamus" Newton, and vocalist Keith "Bod" Ballard) and a short-lived "futuristic metal cyberpunk" band called Album Graecum—Lant took the stage name Cronos and, in 1979, joined a band called Guillotine as a guitarist. There, he met Jeffrey Dunn, who later became Mantas. In 1979, the original bassist left one week before a church hall gig. Instead of cancelling the show, Cronos took up the bass, and they changed the band name to Venom. Cronos continued to play bass throughout his career in Venom. In 1980, the band's vocalist, Clive Archer (stage name Jesus Christ), left the band, leaving Cronos to take over that role as well, finalising the band as a three-piece group.

Cronos started working at a recording studio called Impulse Studios after he left school. The studio had a number of labels releasing albums by folk musicians and local TV comedians, although he eventually convinced the studio to start a label for rock bands. The label, called Neat Records, began signing bands from across the UK and releasing singles and albums from 1980 onward. As the members of Venom could not afford studio time, Cronos persuaded the studio engineer to let him use some free time in exchange for staying late after work and doing other unpaid tasks. Cronos sent many copies of Venom demos to various record labels and to the rock press, where a journalist for Sounds magazine, Geoff Barton, featured three Venom songs on his playlist. This caught the attention of Neat Records, who then agreed to release the first Venom single.

Cronos was also responsible for designing and creating the Venom logo and the sleeve artwork for their many singles and album releases. He wanted to use the Sigil of Baphomet as the band's main emblem but sought to create a new and original version of the sigil. He began redesigning it, and the Venom logo was drawn and redrawn many times until he was satisfied. The development of the logo can be traced through the band's many single and album covers, as it become increasingly refined over the years. The logo continued to evolve, as Cronos continued to design new versions for merchandise and new albums.

=== Solo work ===
Venom took a break in 1988, and Cronos embarked on a solo career, occasionally featuring in many other bands of a similar genre, including Cronos, Enthroned, Cradle of Filth (Cronos contributed a monologue to the end of the Cradle track "Haunted Shores" from their 1996 album Dusk... and Her Embrace), Warpath, Massacre, and Necrodeath. He also produced albums for other bands.

=== Reforming Venom ===
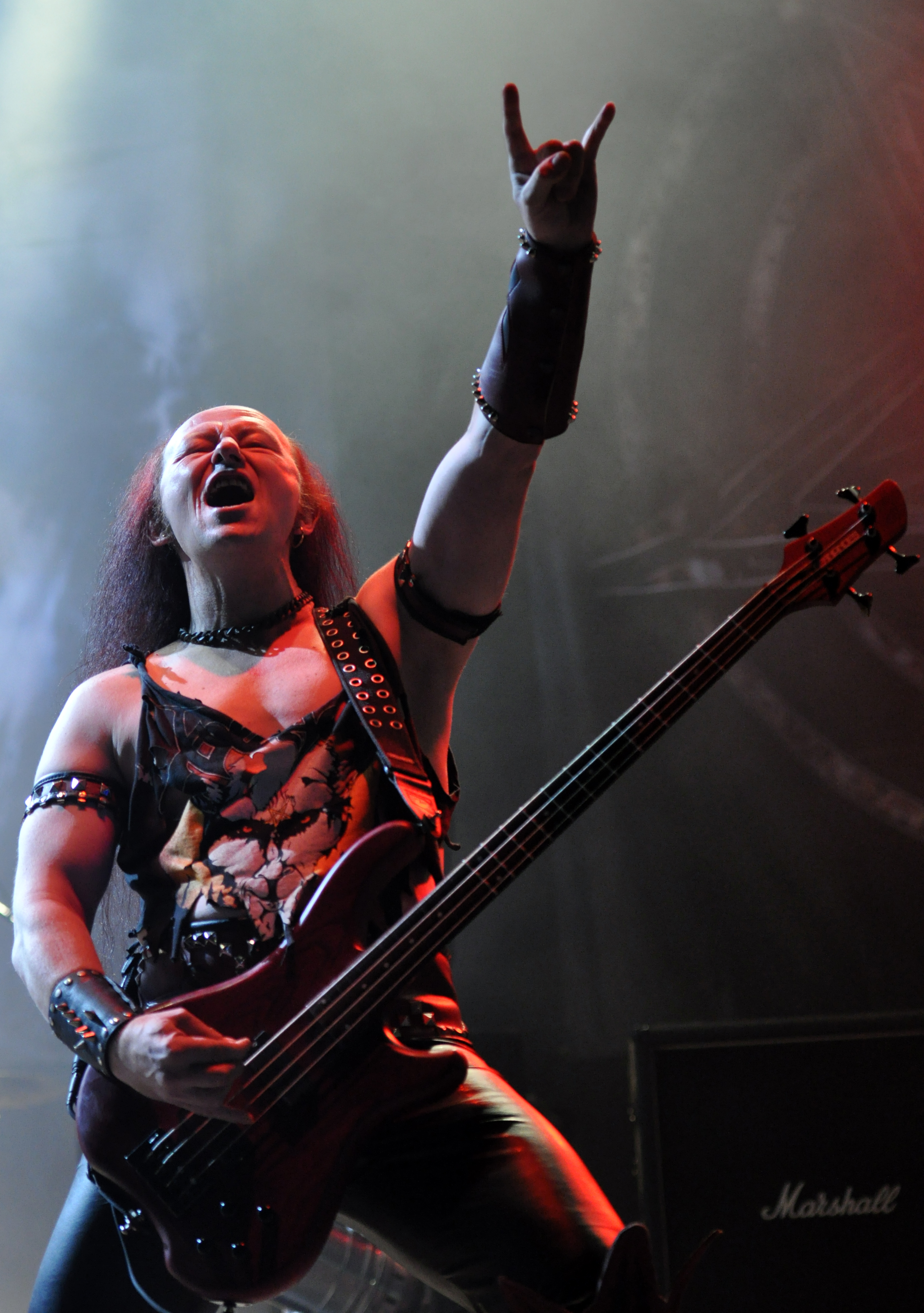
Cronos with Venom in 2013

In 1995, Cronos contacted the original guitarist and drummer and reformed the original Venom lineup, headlining the Dynamo Festival in 1996. Venom attempted to continue with the original members but only managed to play one show per year over the next few years. They had signed a three-album deal with CBH/Steamhammer in Germany, but when they moved forward with the second album after Cast in Stone, certain members chose not to continue. Venom employed a stand-in drummer for the next album, Resurrection, which was well received by critics, although they still only managed to play two shows—the Wacken Open Air festival in Germany and a show in Holland.

Venom was forced to take a break again after Cronos was injured in a climbing accident in 2002, which left him unable to play bass or sing for nearly two years. He took to the computer to pass the time and studied computing and games programming. He learned 3D software skills and worked as the main multimedia engineer for the computer and internet solutions companies K-Class Systems and Globalfibre.tv. Alongside company owner Scott Toward, they created the first computer models for streaming media for the internet and mobile phones, as well as programming and building gaming maps and developing internet access via satellites.

Cronos reformed Venom again around 2003, temporarily recruiting an unknown, basic nu-metal drummer and guitarist, as he needed a couple of average players to help kick-start the band while he searched for professional, permanent musicians. Cronos had asked guitarist Mantas to rejoin the band, but Mantas declined, releasing a statement on Blabbermouth saying he would never rejoin Venom, as he was pursuing a new direction with his band Zero Tolerance and was in the process of recording an album.

After spending the next couple of years planning and in intensive rehearsals, Venom released their album Metal Black in early 2006 with the line-up of Cronos, Mykvs and Antton, and embarked on a sold-out world tour. Venom performed the classic single "Die Hard" alongside Phil Anselmo (Pantera, Down) at the Gods of Metal 2006 festival in Italy, where they headlined. Cronos also appeared on Dave Grohl's heavy metal side project Probot in 2004 and guest starred on the track "Knights of the 21st Century" on HammerFall's 2005 album Chapter V: Unbent, Unbowed, Unbroken.

Venom continued to headline various festivals each year. The lineup of Cronos, Stuart "Rage" Dixon, and Danny "Dante" Needham had remained intact from 2009 until 2026, with four albums released during that period: 2011's Fallen Angels, 2015's From the Very Depths, 2018's Storm the Gates, and 2026's Into Oblivion.

== Personal life ==
Lant played with his brother Anthony "Antton" Lant in Venom, and Lant's oldest brother is Graham Lant, former drummer of Prefab Sprout.

== Death ==
Cronos died on 25 September 2026, aged 63. His death was announced on 1 October by his bandmates Rage, Danté and his son Nathan through social media.

Former bandmate Jeffrey Dunn acknowledged Cronos's death in a post, stating that he was aware of the news several days earlier, but did not issue statements about it to respect Cronos's family. Following his death, the surviving members of Venom announced that the band had retired.

== Discography ==
=== With Venom ===
- Welcome to Hell (1981)
- Black Metal (1982)
- At War with Satan (1984)
- Possessed (1985)
- Eine kleine Nachtmusik (1986)
- Calm Before the Storm (1987)
- Cast in Stone (1997)
- Resurrection (2000)
- Metal Black (2006)
- Hell (2008)
- Fallen Angels (2011)
- From the Very Depths (2015)
- Storm the Gates (2018)
- Into Oblivion (2026)

=== With Cronos ===
- Dancing in the Fire (1990)
- Rock n' Roll Disease (1991)
- Venom (Cronos compilation album) (1995)
- Hell to the Unknown (2006, anthology release)

=== Other appearances ===
- Pure Filth by Warfare (1984) – vocals and bass on "Rose Petals Fall from Her Face"
- Mayhem Fuckin' Mayhem by Warfare (1986) – vocals on "You've Really Got Me"
- Inhuman Condition by Massacre (1992) – vocals on "Warhead"
- Dusk... and Her Embrace by Cradle of Filth (1996) – spoken word on "Haunted Shores"
- Probot by Probot (2004) – vocals and bass on "Centuries of Sin"
- Chapter V: Unbent, Unbowed, Unbroken by HammerFall (2005) – vocals on "Knights of the 21st Century"

=== Production work ===
- Beware of the Dog by Tysondog (1984)
- Se parare nex by The Blood (1985)
- Mayhem Fuckin' Mayhem by Warfare (1986)
