= Jeffrey Dunn =

British guitarist

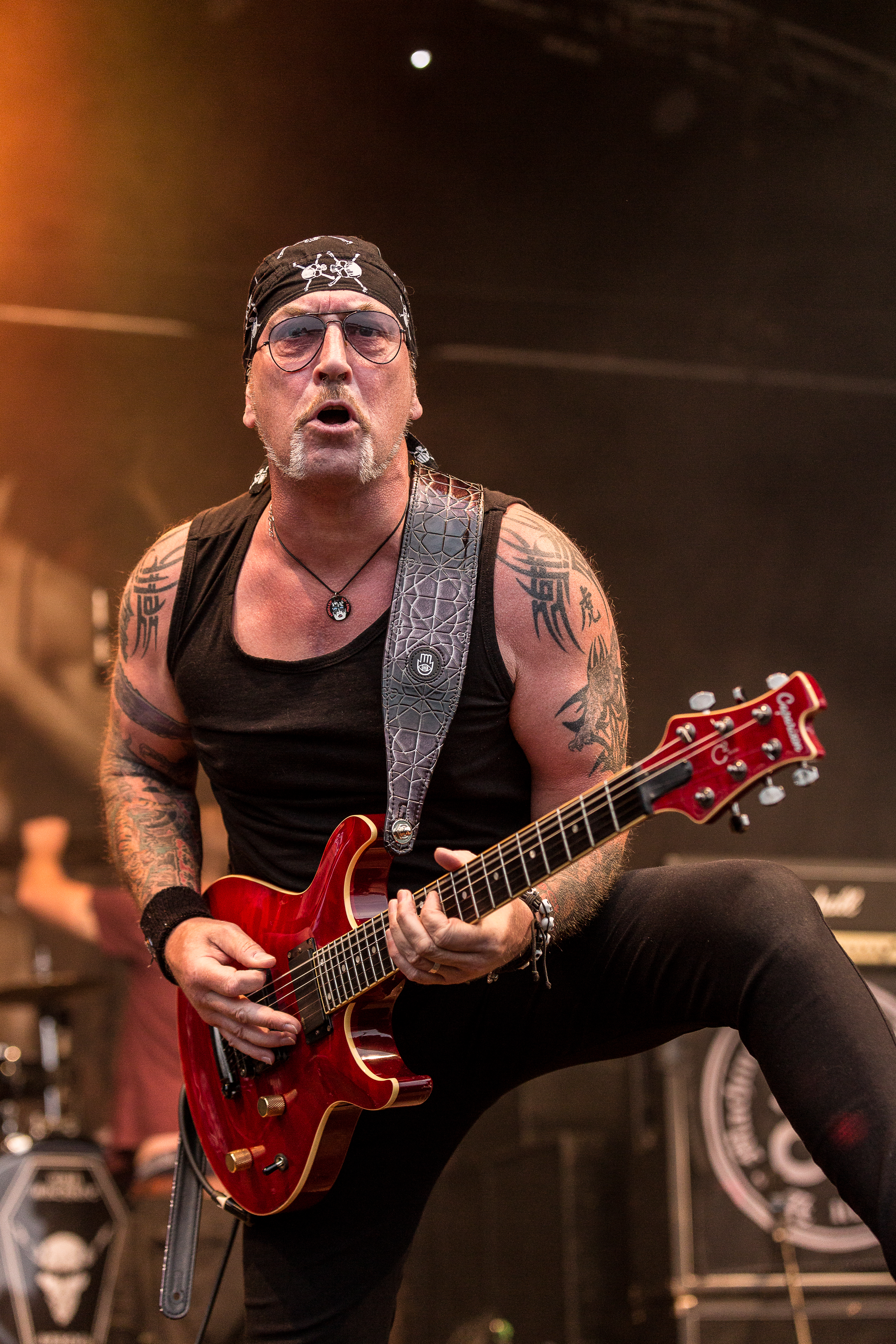
- Dunn with Venom Inc. at Metal Frenzy Open Air 2019

Background information
- Also known as: Mantas
- Born: 22 April 1961 (age 65); Newcastle upon Tyne, England
- Genres: Speed metal; thrash metal; heavy metal
- Occupation: Musician
- Instrument: Guitar
- Years active: 1979–present
- Member of: Mantas; M-pire of Evil
- Formerly of: Venom; Dryll; Warfare; Venom Inc.
- Website: www.mantas.website

Jeffrey "Mantas" Dunn (born 22 April 1961) is a British guitarist who was one of the founding members of the heavy metal band Venom, with which he played as a guitarist from 1979 to 1985 and 1989 to 2002. From 2015 to 2024, he played in Venom Inc. alongside fellow former Venom member Tony Dolan. Dunn's stage name inspired the name of the embryonic Florida death metal band Mantas, which later splintered into Death and Massacre.

== Career after Venom ==
In 1986, Dunn left Venom to form the band Mantas which has recorded two full-length albums, Winds of Change in 1988 and Zero Tolerance in 2004. In 1992, he played guitars for Warfare, a new wave of British heavy metal band.

In 2006, Mantas toured with German hardcore techno act Scooter in Germany as an additional member on guitar; he admitted being apprehensive about the job, as he wasn't a fan of Scooter's music, but admitted to greatly enjoying the tour.

In 2007, he worked with the band Dryll. In 2009, he guested on German metalcore band Last One Dying's debut album The Hour of Lead and released the Dryll EP Digital Surgery which was available at live shows only.

In 2010, Dunn and former Venom members Antony "Antton" Lant (drums; brother of Venom frontman Conrad "Cronos" Lant) and Tony "Demolition Man" Dolan (bass, vocals) formed a band, initially called Primevil and then M-pire of Evil. In 2015, the Venom '89/'90 line-up of Dunn, Dolan and Bray reunited for a concert at the Keep It True festival in Germany, which was the start of what became the band Venom Inc., which released the album Avé in 2017 and toured extensively. The year after, Bray was replaced by Kling.

Dunn played guitar on the track "Hold On" by Scott Michael Cavagan (2019).

=== Other projects ===
When the COVID-19 pandemic broke out in early 2020, Dunn started releasing tutorial videos on Facebook on how to play Venom and Venom Inc. songs. This later developed into livestreams, usually twice a week, first on his personal Facebook page, later on his official Jeff Mantas Dunn page.

== Personal life ==
In May 2018, Dunn underwent emergency heart surgery (double bypass) in Lisbon following a life-threatening incident.

In February 2021, Dunn launched a Jeff Mantas page on Patreon. 25% of the profits goes to a local cat and dog sanctuary and his own cat sanctuary, both in Portugal, where Dunn currently resides.

In August 2023, Dunn announced that his partner has cancer. He stated he will remain beside her "Until a course of treatment is decided by the oncologist". He said that he will fulfil the remainder of festivals up until 3 September at which he will cease touring until further notice.

== Equipment ==
- CSL Flying V
- Ibanez Roadstar with Hardrock'r tremolo system
- Ibanez RG (Black Finish)
- Ibanez RG (Blue Finish)
- Ibanez Xiphos (Black Finish)
- Steinberger Synapse (Black Finish)
- Ibanez Destroyer DT 555 (Black Finish with White Pickups)
- Mantas now uses Caparison guitars.

== Discography ==
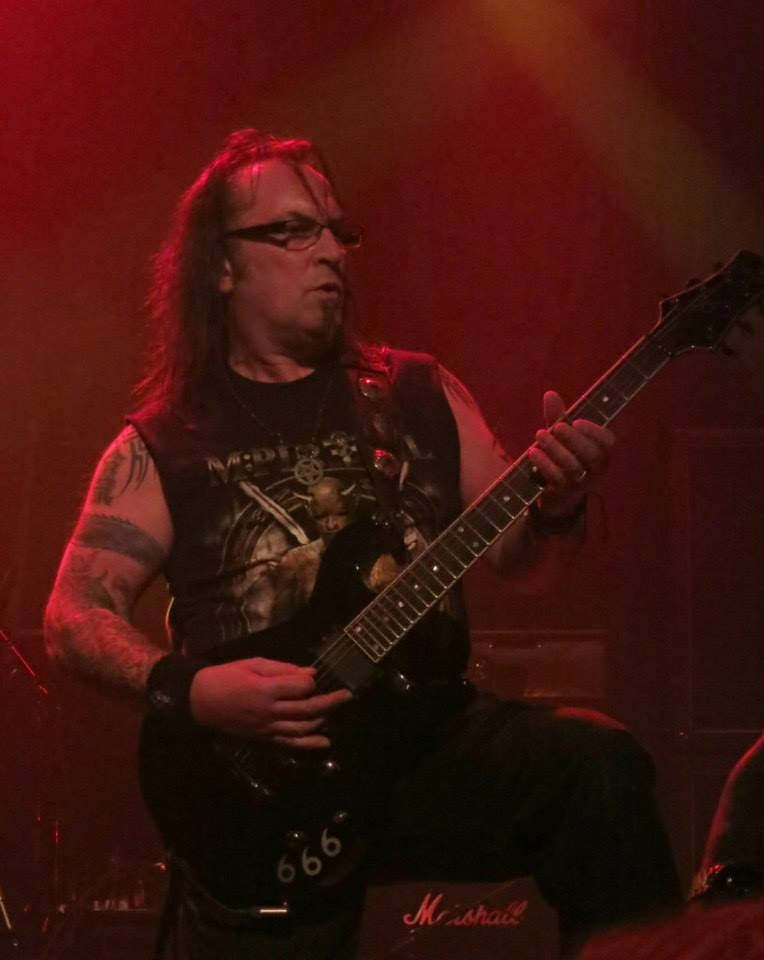
Mantas with M-pire of Evil in 2014

=== With Venom ===
- Welcome to Hell (1981)
- Black Metal (1982)
- At War with Satan (1984) (chart position #64 UK, #48 SE)
- Possessed (1985) (chart position #99 UK)
- Eine kleine Nachtmusik (double live album) (1986)
- Prime Evil (1989)
- Tear Your Soul Apart (EP) (1990)
- Temples of Ice (1991)
- The Waste Lands (1992)
- Venom '96 (EP) (1996)
- Cast in Stone (1997)
- Resurrection (2000)

=== With Mantas ===
- Winds of Change (1988)
- Deceiver (single, 1988)
- Zero Tolerance (2004)

=== With Dryll ===
- Digital Surgery (EP, 2009)

=== With M-pire of Evil ===
- Creatures of the Black (EP, 2011)
- Hell to the Holy (2012)
- Crucified (2013)

=== With Venom Inc. ===
- Avé (2017)
- There's Only Black (2022)

=== With Warfare (as guest) ===
- Noise, Filth and Fury (EP, 1984)
- Pure Filth (1984)
- A Conflict of Hatred (1988)

=== With The Mugshots (as guest) ===
- Children of the Night / The Call (maxi single, 2021)
