= List of Artillery band members =

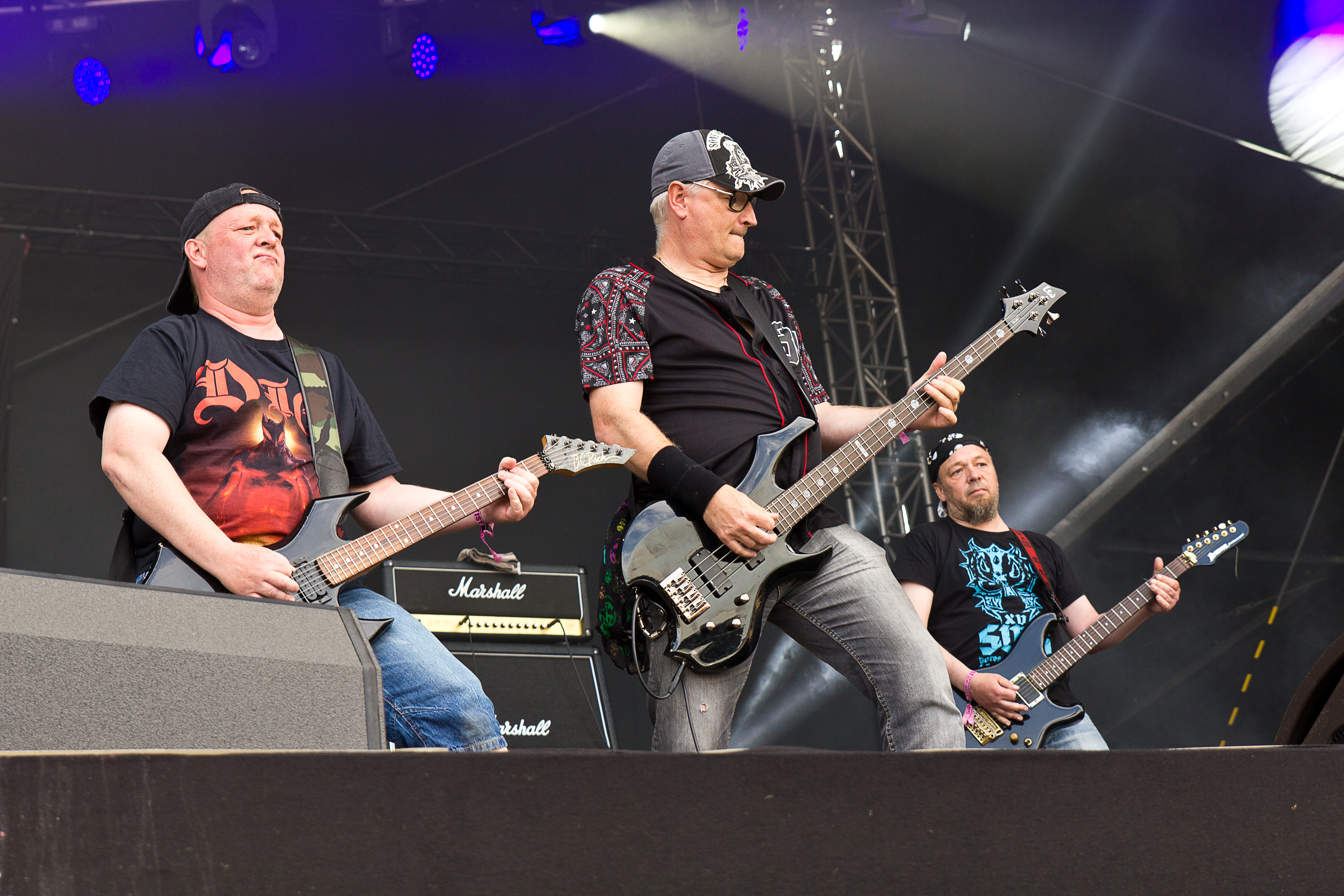
Members of Artillery performing in 2015.

Artillery is a Danish thrash metal band from Taastrup. Formed in 1982, the group originally consisted of guitarists Jørgen Sandau and Benny Petersen, bassist Pete Hurricane and drummer Carsten Nielsen. By the time they recorded their first demo at the end of the year, the band featured brothers Michael and Morten Stützer in place of Petersen and Hurricane, respectively, as well as vocalist Per Onink. Michael Stützer is the only remaining original member of the band, which also includes bassist Peter Thorslund (who first joined in 1988), drummer Frederik Kjelstrup Hansen, vocalist Martin Steene and guitarist René Loua (all of whom joined in 2023).

== History ==
=== 1982–1992 ===
Artillery was formed in June 1982 by guitarist Jørgen Sandau and drummer Carsten Nielsen. The initial lineup also included guitarist Benny Petersen and bassist Pete Hurricane, although Petersen was quickly replaced by Ken C. Jack, before both were replaced by brothers Michael and Morten Stützer, respectively, alongside the arrival of Per Onink as the band's first vocalist. After recording their first demo We Are the Dead at the end of 1982, the band parted ways with Onink (in June 1983) and replaced him with Carsten Lohmann (in September) for second demo Shellshock. After a third demo, Deeds of Darkness, Lohmann was replaced by Flemming Rönsdorf at the start of 1985, recording the band's full-length debut Fear of Tomorrow. Around this time, Sandau dropped lead guitar duties.

The band recorded its second album Terror Squad during 1986, but when it was delayed for almost a year and the band had to turn down several tours as a result, they decided to split up. For the last three weeks of the group's initial tenure, Nielsen was replaced on drums by Henrik Quaade. A year after disbanding, Artillery reformed in August 1988 after being offered a tour in the Soviet Union. After a short string of local shows with the existing lineup (including Nielsen on drums), Sandau left due to a "musical discrepancy", at which point Morten Stützer switched to rhythm guitar. Bass was performed on the Soviet tour in early 1989 by stand-in Peter Thorslund. Michael "Romchael" Rasmussen took over from May to August, before he was fired and Thorslund took over permanently.

At the beginning of 1990, Artillery recorded their third album By Inheritance. Shortly after its release, the band's lineup splintered — first, in August, Michael Stützer left to reform his old band Missing Link; the next month, Rönsdorf also departed, with John Mathiasen taking his place; and in December, Nielsen was replaced by returning drummer Henrik Quaade, while Samir Belmaati joined to replace Stützer. After recording The Mind Factory demo, Quaade was replaced by Benny Dallschmidt at the end of 1991 and Mickey Finn replaced Mathiasen in 1992, prior to Artillery disbanding.

=== 1998–2023 ===
Artillery returned in August 1998, playing a single show to promote the compilation Deadly Relics. The show featured Rönsdorf, the Stützer brothers and Thorslund, plus Missing Link drummer Sven Olsen. During the summer of 1999, the trio recorded a comeback album entitled B.A.C.K. with Per Möller Jensen on drums, which was followed the next year by the single "Jester" with the same lineup. After a four-year break, Artillery played a single show in December 2004 with Hatesphere members Mikael Ehlert on bass and Anders Gyldenøhr on drums. The next reformed in November 2007, after the release of the box set Through the Years, with Michael and Morsten Stützer joined by returning bassist Peter Thorslund, original drummer Carsten Nielsen, and new vocalist Søren Nico Adamsen. This lineup remained stable for several years, releasing the live album and video One Foot in the Grave, the Other One in the Trash in 2008, plus studio albums When Death Comes in 2009 and My Blood in 2011.

In April 2012, Nielsen announced that he was leaving Artillery due to "personal reasons" after two final shows, which took place at the end of May. He was replaced the next month by Josua Madsen. In September, Adamsen also left for the same reported reason, with Michael Bastholm Dahl taking his place. The new lineup released Legions (2013), Penalty by Perception (2016) and The Face of Fear (2018), before Morten Stützer died on 2 October 2019. The band continued with Kræn Meier, who had been filling in for Stützer during his illness since 2017, as an official band member. In 2020, the band recorded "The Last Journey" in tribute to Stützer, with the regular lineup joined by former vocalists Flemming Rönsdorf and Søren Nico Adamsen. In January 2023, Madsen was replaced by Frederik Kjelstrup Hansen. Just over a month later, after rehearsing with a new band, Madsen was hit by a bus and died on 8 March 2013. Starting in April, Søren Nico Adamsen temporarily filled in for Dahl.

=== Since 2023 ===
Dahl officially stepped down from Artillery in September 2023. He was followed by Meier, who quit due to "personal differences" in November. Later in the month, the band unveiled Martin Steene as its new vocalist. The next month, René Loua was announced as the band's new rhythm guitarist.

== Members ==
=== Current ===
Image	Name	Years active	Instruments	Release contributions
	Michael Stützer	1982–1987; 1988–1990; 1998–present	lead and rhythm (until early 1985) guitars; backing vocals (2007 onwards)	all Artillery releases to date, except The Mind Factory (1991)
	Peter Thorslund	1988–1989 (touring only); 1989–1992; 1998–2000 (touring only); 2007–present	bass; backing vocals	all Artillery releases from By Inheritance (1990) to date, except B.A.C.K. (1999) and "Jester" (2000)
	Frederik Kjelstrup Hansen	2023–present	drums	none to date
	Martin Steene	2023–present	lead vocals	none to date
	René Loua	2023–present	rhythm guitar; backing vocals	none to date

=== Former ===
Image	Name	Years active	Instruments	Release contributions
	Jørgen Sandau	1982–1987; 1988	rhythm and lead (until early 1985) guitars	all Artillery releases from We Are the Dead (1982) to Terror Squad (1987)
	Carsten Nielsen	1982–1987; 1988–1990; 2007–2012	drums	all Artillery releases from We Are the Dead (1982) to By Inheritance (1990); One Foot in the Grave, the Other One in the Trash (2008); When Death Comes (2009); My Blood (2011)
	Pete Hurricane	1982	bass	none
	Benny Petersen	1982	lead and rhythm guitars	none
	Ken C. Jack	1982	lead and rhythm guitars	none
	Morten Stützer	1982–1987; 1988–1992; 1998–2019; (his death)	rhythm guitar (1988 onwards); bass (1983–1987, 1988, 1989, 1998–2000); lead guitar (1990); backing vocals (2007 onwards)	all Artillery releases from We Are the Dead (1982) to The Face of Fear (2018)
	Per Onink	1982–1983	lead vocals	We Are the Dead (1982)
	Carsten Lohmann	1983–1984	lead vocals	Shellshock (1984); Deeds of Darkness (1984)
	Flemming Rönsdorf	1985–1987; 1988–1990; 1998–2004	lead vocals	all Artillery releases from the Fear of Tomorrow demo (1985) to "Jester" (2000), except The Mind Factory (1991); "The Last Journey" (2020)
	Henrik Quaade	1987 (touring); 1990–1991	drums	The Mind Factory (1991)
	Michael "Romchael" Rasmussen	1989	bass	none
	John Mathiasen	1990–1992	lead vocals	The Mind Factory (1991)
	Samir Belmaati	1990–1992	lead guitar	The Mind Factory (1991)
	Benny Dallschmidt	1991–1992	drums	none
	Mickey Finn	1992	lead vocals	none
	Sven Olsen	1998 (one-off live member)	drums	none
	Per Möller Jensen	1999–2000 (session/touring)	drums	B.A.C.K. (1999); "Jester" (2000)
	Mikael Ehlert	2004 (one-off live members)	bass	none
	Anders Gyldenøhr	2004 (one-off live members)	drums	none
	Søren Nico Adamsen	2007–2012; 2023 (touring)	lead vocals	One Foot in the Grave, the Other One in the Trash (2008); When Death Comes (2009); My Blood (2011); "The Last Journey" (2020)
	Josua Madsen	2012–2023 (his death)	drums; percussion; backing vocals	all Artillery releases from Legions (2013) to Raw Live at Copenhell (2024)
	Michael Bastholm Dahl	2012–2023	lead vocals	all Artillery releases from Legions (2013) to Raw Live at Copenhell (2024)
	Kræn Meier	2017–2023 (touring substitute only until October 2019)	rhythm guitar; backing vocals	"The Last Journey" (2020); X (2021); Raw Live at Copenhell (2024)

== Lineups ==
Period	Members	Releases
June–July 1982	Jørgen Sandau — lead/rhythm guitars; Benny Petersen — lead/rhythm guitars; Pete Hurricane — bass; Carsten Nielsen — drums	none
July–August 1982	Jørgen Sandau — lead/rhythm guitars; Ken C. Jack — lead/rhythm guitars; Pete Hurricane — bass; Carsten Nielsen — drums	none
August 1982–June 1983	Per Onink — vocals; Jørgen Sandau — lead/rhythm guitars; Michael Stützer — lead/rhythm guitars; Morten Stützer — bass; Carsten Nielsen — drums	We Are the Dead demo (1982)
September 1983–late 1984	Carsten Lohmann — vocals; Jørgen Sandau — lead/rhythm guitars; Michael Stützer — lead/rhythm guitars; Morten Stützer — bass; Carsten Nielsen — drums	Shellshock demo (1984); Deeds of Darkness demo (1984)
January 1985–1987	Flemming Rönsdorf — vocals; Michael Stützer — lead guitar; Jørgen Sandau — rhythm guitar; Morten Stützer — bass; Carsten Nielsen — drums	Fear of Tomorrow demo (1985); Fear of Tomorrow (1985); Terror Squad (1987)
1987	Flemming Rönsdorf — vocals; Michael Stützer — lead guitar; Jørgen Sandau — rhythm guitar; Morten Stützer — bass; Henrik Quaade — drums	none
Band inactive 1987–1988
August–October 1988	Flemming Rönsdorf — vocals; Michael Stützer — lead guitar; Jørgen Sandau — rhythm guitar; Morten Stützer — bass; Carsten Nielsen — drums	none
Late 1988–early 1989	Flemming Rönsdorf — vocals; Michael Stützer — lead guitar; Morten Stützer — rhythm guitar, bass; Peter Thorslund — bass (touring member); Carsten Nielsen — drums	none
Early/spring 1989	Flemming Rönsdorf — vocals; Michael Stützer — lead guitar; Morten Stützer — rhythm guitar, bass; Carsten Nielsen — drums	Khomaniac demo (1989)
May–August 1989	Flemming Rönsdorf — vocals; Michael Stützer — lead guitar; Morten Stützer — rhythm guitar; Michael Rasmussen — bass; Carsten Nielsen — drums	none
Fall 1989–August 1990	Flemming Rönsdorf — vocals; Michael Stützer — lead guitar; Morten Stützer — rhythm guitar; Peter Thorslund — bass; Carsten Nielsen — drums	By Inheritance (1990)
August–September 1990	Flemming Rönsdorf — vocals; Morten Stützer — guitar; Peter Thorslund — bass; Carsten Nielsen — drums	none
September–December 1990	John Mathiasen — vocals; Morten Stützer — guitar; Peter Thorslund — bass; Carsten Nielsen — drums	none
December 1990–late 1991	John Mathiasen — vocals; Samir Belmaati — lead guitar; Morten Stützer — rhythm guitar; Peter Thorslund — bass; Henrik Quaade — drums	The Mind Factory demo (1991) (also released as Promo '92 in 1992)
Late 1991–1992	John Mathiasen — vocals; Samir Belmaati — lead guitar; Morten Stützer — rhythm guitar; Peter Thorslund — bass; Benny Dallschmidt — drums	none
1992	Mickey Finn — vocals; Samir Belmaati — lead guitar; Morten Stützer — rhythm guitar; Peter Thorslund — bass; Benny Dallschmidt — drums	none
Band inactive 1992–1998
August 1998 (one-off live performance)	Flemming Rönsdorf — vocals; Michael Stützer — lead guitar; Morten Stützer — rhythm guitar, studio bass; Peter Thorslund — bass (live member); Sven Olsen — drums (live member)	none
1999–2000	Flemming Rönsdorf — vocals; Michael Stützer — lead guitar; Morten Stützer — rhythm guitar, bass; Peter Thorslund — bass (touring member); Per M. Jensen — drums (session/touring)	B.A.C.K. (1999); "Jester" (2000)
Band inactive 2000–2004
December 2004 (one-off live performance)	Flemming Rönsdorf — vocals; Michael Stützer — lead guitar; Morten Stützer — rhythm guitar, studio bass; Mikael Ehlert — bass (live member); Anders Gyldenøhr — drums (live member)	none
Band inactive 2004–2007
November 2007–May 2012	Søren N. Adamsen — lead vocals; Michael Stützer — lead guitar, backing vocals; Morten Stützer — rhythm guitar, backing vocals; Peter Thorslund — bass, backing vocals; Carsten Nielsen — drums	One Foot in the Grave, the Other One in the Trash (2008); When Death Comes (2009); My Blood (2011)
June–September 2012	Søren N. Adamsen — lead vocals; Michael Stützer — lead guitar, backing vocals; Morten Stützer — rhythm guitar, backing vocals; Peter Thorslund — bass, backing vocals; Josua Madsen — drums, backing vocals	none
September 2012–October 2019	Michael B. Dahl — lead vocals; Michael Stützer — lead guitar, backing vocals; Morten Stützer — rhythm guitar, backing vocals; Peter Thorslund — bass, backing vocals; Josua Madsen — drums, backing vocals	Legions (2013); Penalty by Perception (2016); The Face of Fear (2018)
October 2019–January 2023	Michael B. Dahl — lead vocals; Michael Stützer — lead guitar, backing vocals; Kræn Meier — rhythm guitar, backing vocals; Peter Thorslund — bass, backing vocals; Josua Madsen — drums, backing vocals	"The Last Journey" (2020); X (2021); Raw Live at Copenhell (2024)
January–April 2023	Michael B. Dahl — lead vocals; Michael Stützer — lead guitar, backing vocals; Kræn Meier — rhythm guitar, backing vocals; Peter Thorslund — bass, backing vocals; Frederik K. Hansen — drums	none
May–September 2023	Søren N. Adamsen — lead vocals (touring); Michael Stützer — lead guitar, backing vocals; Kræn Meier — rhythm guitar, backing vocals; Peter Thorslund — bass, backing vocals; Frederik K. Hansen — drums	none
December 2023–	Martin Steene — lead vocals; Michael Stützer — lead guitar, backing vocals; René Loua — rhythm guitar, backing vocals; Peter Thorslund — bass, backing vocals; Frederik K. Hansen — drums	none to date
