= Through the Years (Artillery album) =

Box set by Artillery
- Released: 10 September 2007
- Recorded: 1984–1999
- Genre: Thrash metal
- Label: Metal Mind Records

Artillery chronology
B.A.C.K. (1999)	Through the Years (2007)	When Death Comes (2009)

Through the Years is a compilation album by Danish thrash metal band Artillery, released on 10 September 2007 through Metal Mind Records. It is a four-CD collector's box set containing all four of Artillery's studio releases prior to their 2007 reunion (Fear of Tomorrow, Terror Squad, By Inheritance, and B.A.C.K.). It also has a 32-page booklet, all the lyrics printed, and the songs are remastered using a 24-bit process on gold discs. Each disc has multiple bonus tracks.

There is a pressing error in the track listing of this box set: on the By Inheritance album, the first bonus track is named as a demo of "Khomaniac", but is actually the same version of "Too Late to Regret" also featured as a bonus track on the Terror Squad album. The song is now available as a free download and streaming on the official Artillery website.

== Track listing ==
All tracks are written by Artillery, except where noted

Disc one: Fear of Tomorrow
No.	Title	Length
1.	"Time Has Come"	5:23
2.	"The Almighty"	4:17
3.	"Show Your Hate"	4:54
4.	"King, Thy Name Is Slayer"	3:42
5.	"Out of the Sky"	3:49
6.	"Into the Universe"	3:48
7.	"The Eternal War"	5:28
8.	"Fear of Tomorrow"	3:27
9.	"Deeds of Darkness"	6:41

Bonus tracks
No.	Title	Length
10.	"Out of the Sky" (with Flemming Rönsdorf)
11.	"Deeds of Darkness" (with Carsten Lohmann)
12.	"Fear of Tomorrow" (with Flemming Rönsdorf)
13.	"Hey Woman" (with Carsten Lohmann)
14.	"Time Has Come" (with Carsten Lohmann)
15.	"Mind of No Return" (with Per Onink)
16.	"Bitch" (with Carsten Lohmann)

Disc two: Terror Squad
No.	Title	Length
1.	"The Challenge"	4:13
2.	"In the Trash"	4:47
3.	"Terror Squad"	5:47
4.	"Let There Be Sin"	3:53
5.	"Hunger and Greed"	5:04
6.	"Therapy"	4:03
7.	"At War with Science"	7:10
8.	"Decapitations of Deviants"	4:37

Bonus tracks
No.	Title	Length
9.	"The Challenge" (bonus demo)
10.	"In the Trash" (bonus demo)
11.	"Therapy" (bonus demo)
12.	"Let There Be Sin" (bonus demo)
13.	"All for You" (with Per Onink)
14.	"We Are the Dead" (with Per Onink)
15.	"Too Late to Regret" (with Carsten Lohmann)
16.	"Deserter" (with Carsten Lohmann)

Disc three: By Inheritance
No.	Title	Length
1.	"7:00 from Tashkent"	0:54
2.	"Khomaniac"	6:42
3.	"Beneath the Clay (R.I.P.)"	4:49
4.	"By Inheritance"	5:43
5.	"Bombfood"	5:44
6.	"Don't Believe"	4:40
7.	"Life in Bondage"	5:26
8.	"Equal at First"	4:24
9.	"Razamanaz" (Nazareth cover)	3:14
10.	"Back in the Trash"	6:01

Bonus tracks
No.	Title	Length
11.	"Khomaniac" (with Flemming Rönsdorf; mistitled as "Too Late to Regret", same version as on Terror Squad; now available on the Artillery website)
12.	"Don't Believe" (with Flemming Rönsdorf)
13.	"Hey Woman" (with Flemming Rönsdorf)
14.	"All for You" (with Carsten Lohmann)
15.	"Blessed Are the Strong" (with Carsten Lohmann)
16.	"Day of Doom" (with Per Onink)

Disc four: B.A.C.K.
No.	Title	Length
1.	"Cybermind"	4:01
2.	"How Do You Feel"	4:01
3.	"Out of the Trash"	4:00
4.	"Final Show"	5:27
5.	"WWW"	3:54
6.	"Violent Breed"	3:48
7.	"Theatrical Exposure"	3:57
8.	"B.A.C.K."	3:48
9.	"The Cure"	3:18
10.	"Paparazzi"	4:07

Bonus tracks
No.	Title	Length
11.	"Fly"	4:25
12.	"Jester"	5:18
