= Recognize No Authority =

Studio album by Détente
- Released: July 1986
- Recorded: April 1986
- Studio: Baby-O's (Hollywood)
- Genres: Thrash metal; speed metal
- Length: 34:29
- Labels: Roadrunner; Metal Blade
- Producer: Dana Strum

Détente chronology
Recognize No Authority (1986)	History 1 (2008)

Professional ratings
Review scores
Source	Rating
Blabbermouth.net	7/10
The Encyclopedia of Popular Music	3/5 stars
Kerrang!	4/5 stars
Metal Forces	81/100
Metal Storm	9.0/10
Rock Hard	7.5/10 (1986); 9/10 (2015)
Sounds	1/5 stars
Terrorizer	6.5/10

Recognize No Authority is the debut studio album by American thrash metal band Détente, released in July 1986. The album was distributed by Roadrunner Records in all regions except for the United States, where it was licensed to Metal Blade Records. The album retains a cult following, with original CD copies selling for high prices on eBay.

== Critical reception ==
In 2015, Mike McPadden of VH1 called the album "a landmark of socially conscious outrage metal that ranks high in the pantheon of hard-and-heavy revolutionary classics by political rockers from Sepultura to Rage Against the Machine." In 2026, Bandcamp Daily called the album an "underground classic".

== Track listing ==
No.	Title	Length
1.	"Losers"	3:20
2.	"Russian Roulette"	4:16
3.	"It's Your Fate"	3:16
4.	"Holy Wars"	4:25
5.	"Catalepsy" (instrumental)	2:52
6.	"Shattered Illusions"	3:08
7.	"Life in Pain"	3:58
8.	"Blood I Bleed"	2:53
9.	"Widows Walk"	2:34
10.	"Vultures in the Sky"	3:44
Total length:		34:29

== Personnel ==
Credits adapted from liner notes.

Détente

- Dawn Crosby - vocals
- Ross Robinson - guitars, guitar solos (1, 2, 4-7, 9, 10)
- Caleb Quinn - guitars, guitar solos (3, 8)
- Steve Hochheiser - bass
- Dennis Butler - drums

Production

- Dana Strum - production
- Mike Davis - engineering
- Ron McMasters - mastering

Artwork

- Dawn Crosby - cover concept
- Otis B. Link - band logos, front cover photos
