= Dancing with the Devil =

Dancing with the Devil may refer to:

- Dancing with the Devil... the Art of Starting Over, a 2021 album by Demi Lovato
  - "Dancing with the Devil" (song), a 2021 song by Demi Lovato
  - Demi Lovato: Dancing with the Devil, a 2021 documentary television series
- Dancing with the Devil, a 2001 album by Seann Scott
- "Dancing with the Devil", a song by Jelly Roll from Whitsitt Chapel
- "Dancing with the Devil", a song by Krewella from Get Wet
- "Dancing with the Devil", a song by Lovebites from Electric Pentagram

== See also ==
- Dance with the devil (disambiguation)
