= Ann Boleyn (singer) =

American singer

- Born: June 14, 1960 (age 66); Seattle, Washington, U.S.
- Genres: Heavy metal, hard rock
- Occupations: Singer, songwriter, producer, attorney
- Instruments: Vocals, keyboards
- Years active: 1972–present
- Website: hellion.us

Ann Boleyn (born Anne Hull; June 14, 1960) is an American musician, best known as the lead singer of the heavy metal band Hellion. She has been credited with developing the careers of several international recording artists through her record label New Renaissance Records. Known for her dramatic contralto voice, she would later earn a Juris Doctor degree and litigate against music industry sexism.

== Early life ==
Ann Boleyn was born in Seattle, Washington on June 14, 1960, as Anne Hull. She was raised in the small town of Centralia, Washington, which is midway between Seattle, Washington and Portland, Oregon.

Boleyn began as a keyboard player in the early 1970s, specializing in the Hammond organ, and also briefly played bass. According to an interview in Hit Parader magazine, Boleyn was performing in nightclubs and at high school dances by the time she was thirteen, often without the knowledge of her parents. Boleyn had already received offers to tour in several bands by age fifteen, including Zephyr, which included her childhood friend and future Deep Purple guitarist Tommy Bolin.

In 2004, Boleyn graduated from the University of California, Los Angeles, with a bachelor's degree in Germanic languages, having specialized in the study of the Old Norse language. Boleyn subsequently obtained her Juris Doctor degree in 2007 from the University of La Verne.

== Career ==
=== Kim Fowley brings Ann Boleyn to Hollywood ===
In 1976, while still a teenager in high school, producer Kim Fowley recruited her to join The Runaways as the bass player. According to the liner-notes of the "Queen of Hell" anthology album, after she threatened to run away, Boleyn's parents finally allowed her to leave her home in Washington State and move to Hollywood. Ann Boleyn acknowledges that, from the moment she met Fowley, she did not see eye-to-eye with him. Other accounts relate that guitarist Tommy Bolin convinced her not to join the band and that the verse "Just keep me out of L.A., things are crazy out there" from his song "Post Toastee" referred to Fowley's management of the all-female band. Ann Boleyn has stated in interviews that she was never a member of The Runaways, even though Fowley brought her to Hollywood. Ann has never been officially acknowledged as having ever been a member of The Runaways.

=== Movies ===
Ann was spotted by Hal Guthu, a modeling agent who had been the still photographer and cinematographer for Edward D. Wood, Jr. Although Hal Guthu rarely accepted brunettes, he made an exception with Boleyn, who he said reminded him of Vampira when interviewed in the August 1984 edition of CineBeat. Through Hal Guthu, Ann Boleyn became featured in a number of B-rate horror movies for which she used other names, allegedly to avoid embarrassment to her family. Some, have speculated that Boleyn was under-age at the time many of her movies were filmed. Ann Boleyn's music, singing, and screams also can be heard on various sound tracks, including The Return of the Living Dead, Part II.

=== Radio host on KROQ in Los Angeles ===
By 1977, Ann Boleyn emerged as the midnight-to-six DJ at Los Angeles Radio Station KROQ-FM, where she hosted a show that specialized in fast-paced metal and punk. By the time the station decided to alter its format to "the rock of the 80s", Boleyn's show had become known as "Speed Metal Hell", a term Boleyn later used for the heavy metal compilations albums she would later produce.

=== Keyboard work in Los Angeles ===
From the mid-1970s, until about 1981, Ann Boleyn only played keyboards. Both Ann Boleyn and Yngwie Malmsteen are featured on the debut release by Third Stage Alert, which was signed to Metal Blade Records. Boleyn also was a member of Beowulf, which included future Accept and Bangalore Choir lead singer, David Reece, future Hellion guitarist Ray Schenck and British guitarist, Chris Voysey. Reece left the band and replaced Udo Dirkschneider in Accept.

=== Hellion ===
In 1981 or 1982, Ann Boleyn together with guitarist Ray Schenck, bassist Peyton Tuthill, and drummer Sean Kelley formed Hellion. Unable to find a singer, Ann Boleyn and Ray Schenck handled vocals. This is also when Boleyn adopted her stage name. The group released a series of albums which were met with varying success. They were signed to Music For Nations in England, Roadrunner Records in Europe, Pony Canyon in Japan, and New Renaissance Records in the USA.

In 1984, Hellion's Mini album was voted #4 record of the year in Kerrang and Sounds Magazine. Hellion played multiple nights to capacity crowds at London's Marquee Club. In 1984, famed metal vocalist, Ronnie James Dio offered to produce Hellion. Around the same time, Wendy Dio, the wife of Ronnie James Dio, began managing Hellion through her company, Niji Productions. A song that was produced by Ronnie James Dio and engineered by Angelo Arcuri was released on Roadrunner Records. Hellion was set to be the co-headliner with Hanoi Rocks, but the tour was cancelled after the death of Hanoi Rocks's drummer Razzle. In addition to headlining a variety of clubs and small theaters, Hellion also served as a support act for artists including Dio, Whitesnake, W.A.S.P., and others. In 1986, Ann Boleyn was fired from Hellion and replaced with a male singer, Richard Parico.

After a legal dispute about the ownership of the name Hellion, Boleyn's former members and Parico changed the band name to Burn. Ann Boleyn retained the name Hellion and invited drummer Greg Pecka (formerly of Dokken), bassist Alex Campbell (formerly of Lion, and guitarist Chet Thompson to join the band.

Niji Productions continued to represent Burn, but fired Hellion in 1986. Next, Boleyn formed New Renaissance Records, which put out the first commercial recordings and helped develop the careers of then unknown bands such as Sepultura, Bathory, Flotsam & Jetsam, At War, Morbid Angel and Wehrmacht. Other label acts included Deadly Blessing, Amulance, Blood Feast, Necrophagia, Dream Death, Ill will, Indestroy, Sarcastic, Artillery, Mayhem, and more. Actor, Johnny Depp's band, Rock City Angels was also signed to New Renaissance Records before landing a deal with Geffen Records.

In 2008, Boleyn appeared at a number of music festivals, singing with Détente where she was filling in for the late Dawn Crosby who died in 1996. Boleyn has since been replaced by Tiina Teal.

In June 2013, Boleyn announced that she was forming a new incarnation of Hellion. In late 2013, Boleyn entered Total Access Studios in Redondo Beach, California, along with Simon Wright, Bjorn Englen, and Maxxxwell Carlisle, and began recording the first new Hellion songs in over a decade. In December 2013, Hellion announced that it had signed a record deal with Cherry Red Records for the release of an anthology CD and for the eventual release of Hellion's extensive back catalogue in Europe and the United Kingdom.

On April 1, 2014, Hellion released a 2-disc CD anthology . On October 2, 2014, Hellion embarked on a tour of North America in support of their Karma's A Bitch mini-album. The touring line-up of Hellion includes Greg Smith on bass, Simon Wright on drums, Scott Warren on keyboards, Maxxxwell Carlisle on lead guitar, Georg Dolivo as special guest rhythm guitarist, and founding member Ann Boleyn on vocals.

Hellion's latest album, Karma's A Bitch, was released on New Renaissance Records in North America and on Cherry Red Records in Europe and Great Britain on October 7, 2014. In the fall of 2014, Ann Boleyn toured with Hellion on a North American tour.
