= Maxxxwell Carlisle =

American guitarist, producer, YouTube host, and bodybuilder

- Born: July 3, 1983 (age 42); Woodinville, Washington United States
- Genres: Power metal; heavy metal
- Instruments: Guitar; bass; keyboards
- Years active: 1999–present
- Member of: Michael Angelo Batio; Hellion; Ann Boleyn; Ethan Brosh; Tina Guo; Nita Strauss; Rick Renstrom; Deathriders; Dave Chedrick; Neil Turbin

Maxxxwell Carlisle (Maxxxwell McHugh Carlisle) is an American heavy metal guitarist, songwriter, producer, YouTube host, and bodybuilder from Los Angeles, California. He was a guitarist in the American Heavy Metal bands Hellion and Society 1. He is also known for his work as a solo artist, as the keyboardist/guitarist of Raptor Command, as a former member of the American Thrash band Deathriders, as the host of the weekly Maxed-Out Metal Hour Show on internet radio station Metal Express Radio, and for his collaborations with other notable musicians such as Michael Angelo Batio, Tina Guo, Nita Strauss, and Ethan Brosh. Carlisle also is the host of two YouTube channels: Guitar Max, devoted to music gear and related topics, and Heavy Metal Horizons, which chronicles Carlisle's training as a pilot and explores other topics including airplanes and automobiles.

== Biography ==
Carlisle was born and raised in Woodinville, a suburb of Seattle, Washington. He studied music in school, beginning at age 8 on the Violin. As he grew older he eventually switched to playing Bass and then Guitar. In 1998 at the age of 15 he formed the band Graceful Chaos with several of his local celebrity friends. The band played around the Seattle area for several years and recorded an EP and one full-length album. The band eventually broke up in 2004. 3 years later he moved to Los Angeles, California and began to further develop his career as a guitarist and songwriter.

=== Hellion ===
Carlisle is the current guitarist for American speed metal band Hellion (band). In June 2013 the new Hellion line-up which also includes Ann Boleyn, Simon Wright and Bjorn Englen began working with veteran producer Ken Scott on a new album. The first of the newly recorded material was released on the double disc compilation album "To Hellion and Back" on April 1, 2014. This was followed by an EP of all new music titled, "Karma's a Bitch" in October 2014. Hellion toured in support of the new EP in late 2014 and have since done various one-off shows including the east coast Monsters of Rock Cruise in February 2016. Hellion has announced plans to release a live album with recordings from the 2014 Karma's a Bitch tour.

=== Society 1 ===
On January 18, 2017, Carlisle was announced as the new guitarist for Industrial Metal veterans Society 1 via social media and metal press outlets.

=== Solo ===
After moving to Los Angeles in 2007, Carlisle released his first solo album, "Ramming Speed" in 2008. Since then he has released a full-length instrumental album, "Speed Force" in 2010 as well as two vocal based EPs, "Visions of Victory" and "Full Metal Thunder" in 2012 and 2013, respectively. He has also released 3 music videos for the songs, "Speed Force", "Power Angel" and "Full Metal Thunder". The last 2 were directed by Society 1 frontman Matt Zane. In April 2014 Carlisle released the single "Visions of Speed and Thunder" as the title track to his upcoming compilation album. At the beginning of 2015 it was announced that Maxxxwell Carlisle had signed a distribution deal with Killer Metal Records of Germany for the release of the "Visions of Speed and Thunder" album. The album was released on February 13 in Europe and February 20th in all other territories. Also in February, Maxxxwell released a lyric video for the song "Ramming Speed". On June 9, 2015, Maxxxwell released a cover of "Like Hell" by the Japanese metal band Loudness along with details of his upcoming solo album "When The Clock Strikes Metal". Later that year, in December, Carlisle released a 2nd single "Black Widow" with Michael Yancy on lead vocals. The track was a U.D.O. cover originally from the 1987 "Animal House" album.

=== Raptor Command ===
Carlisle is the keyboardist, guitarist and primary songwriter of Raptor Command, the self-proclaimed "heavy metal tribute to Elon Musk". Raptor Command released its first single on April 20, 2016, via iTunes, Amazon.com and other digital media outlets. The band also includes Deakon Lekross, Jericho Law and Fang VonWrathenstein AKA Ty Christian who Carlisle has worked with previously. The band released the full album Elon in 2019.

=== Deathriders ===
In 2011 Carlisle played in Deathriders, the Los Angeles-based thrash band led by original Anthrax vocalist Neil Turbin on the band's "Stay Scream'n 2011 Tour".

=== Collaborations ===
Over the course of his solo career Carlisle has collaborated with many different musicians on various recording projects. In 2009 he released a single "Duet for Electric Guitar and Electric Cello in A minor" with electric cellist Tina Guo. He would also make an appearance in the music video for her song "Forbidden City" 2 years later. Additionally he appeared in the music video for the Byron Gore song "Grey". On Carlisle's "Speed Force" instrumental album in 2010, he featured guitarist Michael Angelo Batio on the song "Axis Accelerator". Later that same year he would write, produce and perform on a song which was released on Michael Angelo Batio's "Hands Without Shadows II – Voices" album. On his two vocal based solo albums he has featured several other guitarists including Nita Strauss, Ethan Brosh, Rick Renstrom and Dannyjoe Carter. Carlisle also performed on and produced a track for the latest Michael Angelo Batio "Intermezzo" album. The album also features George Lynch, Rusty Cooley, Craig Goldy, Jeff Loomis, Guthrie Govan, Dave Reffett, Joe Stump and others. "Intermezzo" was listed as one of the Top 5 Shred Albums of 2014 by Guitar World Magazine. Additionally, Carlisle has shot and directed two music videos for Batio for the songs "Badlands" and "More Machine Than Man" from Batio's 2020 album of the same name. Carlisle also appeared as a guest soloist on the Lords of the Trident EP "re:Quests".

=== Metal Express Radio Host ===
In August 2015, Carlisle announced via his Twitter and Facebook pages that he would be hosting a weekly 1 hour radio program on the internet radio station Metal Express Radio. The show debuted on September 10, 2015, and continues to air twice every Thursday.

=== Bodybuilding ===
Carlisle competed in 24 bodybuilding competitions from 2002 to 2009. Out of the 24 competitions, he won his weight class 8 times, placed in the top 5 20 times, and also won 3 "Best Poser" awards (a presentation award). He is currently on hiatus from competitive bodybuilding due to his recording and touring schedule although he has stated that he is still, "dedicated to the bodybuilding lifestyle" and looks forward to a time when he can return to competition.

== Personal life ==
Maxxxwell Carlisle is married and lives in Los Angeles, California. Carlisle has described himself as an enthusiast of science and astronomy and is a member of The Planetary Society, the private space exploration advocacy group.

== Discography ==
=== Solo ===
- "Ramming Speed" (2008) Power Dungeon Music
- "Duet for Electric Guitar and Electric Cello in A minor" Single (2009) Power Dungeon Music
- "Speed Force" (2010) Power Dungeon Music
- "Visions of Victory EP" (2012) Power Dungeon Music
- "Full Metal Thunder EP" (2013) Power Dungeon Music
- "Visions of Speed and Thunder" Single (2014) Power Dungeon Music
- "Visions of Speed and Thunder" Album (2015) Killer Metal Records Power Dungeon Music
- "Like Hell" Single (2015) Power Dungeon Music
- "Black Widow" Single (2015) Power Dungeon Music
- "Queen of the Reich" Single (2016) Power Dungeon Music
- "The Schwarzschild Radius" (2017) Power Dungeon Music
- "The Triumph of Reason" (2018) Power Dungeon Music
- "Death on the Iron Mountain" (2019) Power Dungeon Music

=== Hellion ===
- "To Hellion and Back" (2014) New Renaissance Cherry Red
- "Karma's a Bitch EP" (2014) New Renaissance Cherry Red

=== Graceful Chaos ===
- "Wall of Thunder EP" (2001) JerkBeast Records
- "The Right to Rock" (2003) Wellington Records

=== Raptor Command ===
- "Elon: Champion for Humanity" Single (2016) Power Dungeon Music
- "Fusion Reactor (In The Sky)" Single (2017) Power Dungeon Music
- "Elon" Album (2019) Power Dungeon Music

=== Guest appearances ===
- Michael Angelo Batio – Hands Without Shadows Part 2 – Voices (2009) M.A.C.E. Music
- Michael Angelo Batio – Intermezzo (2013) M.A.C.E. Music
- Lords of the Trident – re:Quests (2015)
- Chris Violence – The Raven (2016)
