= My Blood =

My Blood may refer to:

- My Blood (Artillery album), 2011
- My Blood (Christopher album), 2021
- "My Blood" (Twenty One Pilots song), 2018
- "My Blood" (Ellie Goulding song), 2012
- "My Blood", a song by Westlife, from the 2019 album Spectrum
- "My Blood", a song by AlunaGeorge, from the 2016 album I Remember
- "My Blood, a song by Rachel Chinouriri, from the 2024 album What a Devastating Turn of Events
