= Dead Inside (Nita Strauss song) =

2021 song by Nita Strauss

Single by Nita Strauss featuring David Draiman

from the album The Call of the Void
- Released: October 15, 2021
- Genre: Hard rock; arena metal; power metal
- Length: 4:00
- Label: Sumerian
- Songwriters: David Draiman; Strauss; Kile Odell
- Producer: Odell

Nita Strauss singles chronology
"Mariana Trench" (2018)	"Dead Inside" (2021)	"Victorious (featuring Dorothy)" (2023)

alternate cover

Music video
- "Dead Inside" on YouTube

"Dead Inside" is a song by American guitarist Nita Strauss, featuring vocals by David Draiman of Disturbed. It was released as the first single from Strauss's second studio album, The Call of the Void. The song reached No. 1 on the US Billboard Mainstream Rock Airplay chart in January 2022.

== Background and release ==
Draiman said he first met Strauss when he saw Alice Cooper perform in Austin, Texas, where he was living at the time. Draiman also said they had performed together on stage at least a few times at a benefit for the Maui Food Bank before the pandemic, and that they had been friends for years.

Strauss said "Dead Inside" was not originally written with a particular vocalist in mind. She recalled working on the song in a Nashville studio while making an album, and said that it had no lyrics or melody at the time. Her boyfriend and manager, Josh Villalta, suggested that it was "a David Draiman song" and contacted Draiman to send him the track. According to Strauss, Villalta said the song sounded like Draiman's earlier side project, but was "a little heavier, a little steadier, a little more me".

Draiman said he revisited the track about a month after receiving it, while he had some free time in Southern California. He said it "just clicked" and that he spent 48 hours sending Strauss and Villalta text messages until the song was completed. He and Strauss went into a studio in Los Angeles the following week, where they recorded the song in one day. Strauss said Draiman quickly came up with a vocal part that she was happy with. She described him as "so professional", adding that "every line was delivered with such intensity".

The single was released on October 15, 2021, accompanied by a music video directed and produced by Steven Contreras. It was Strauss's first solo release since her 2018 debut album Controlled Chaos and her first to feature a vocalist. Guitar World reported that it was the first track she had written with vocals that she had released publicly.

== Composition ==
Discussing the song's sound, Draiman said that anything he sang would have a "Disturbed vibe". He added that he had been eager to return to the band's old-school style after Disturbed's 2018 album Evolution, which he said was at least half balladry. When asked to explain the song's lyrics, Draiman referred to "the curse of being an internet expert of everything". He said information was opinion-based, skewed and distorted to fit particular narratives, and that people polarized themselves and distanced themselves from friendships, reality and reason.

Guitar World described the song as containing elements of modern rock and tech metal. Blabbermouth.net described "Dead Inside" as opening with Strauss's lead guitar work before Villalta's drums enter around the main riff. Draiman then delivers the vocal melody and chorus. A heavy passage precedes the final chorus.

Loudwire noted that the track moved away from the guitar flourishes that dominated Strauss's debut album and leaned more towards hard rock. It described the lead melody as simple and catchy, the drum beat as driving and Draiman's vocal delivery as snarling and soaring. Revolver described the song as a cross between Disturbed's "OG sound" and heavy contemporary groove metal, contrasting it with Strauss's 2018 debut album Controlled Chaos, which the publication described as an instrumental guitar album blending thrash, metalcore and prog.

== Reception ==
Ricky Aarons of Wall of Sound praised Strauss's guitar playing and said that Draiman was leaning into more of his earlier vocal roots on the track. He called the song "a standout". Reviewing The Call of the Void, Sam Khaneka of Distorted Sound described "Dead Inside" as "groove-laden", noting its "frenetic, twisting riffs and leads". He called the track "disquieting and infectious" and said that Draiman's vocals made comparisons with Disturbed "almost inevitable". In its coverage of the live performance, Revolver described the song as having the "anthemic catchiness" of Disturbed and the "shreddy flair" of Strauss's solo material.

== Live performances ==
Strauss and Draiman performed "Dead Inside" live together for the first time on November 18, 2021, at the Whisky a Go Go in West Hollywood, California. During the performance, Draiman encouraged the audience to cheer Strauss during her guitar solo. As Strauss bowed, he told the audience, "Make some noise for Nita Strauss!" and the two embraced. Strauss called the night "one of the best nights of my whole life!"

Strauss said her band used a playback recording of Draiman's vocals when performing the song on tour. She said she listened to his isolated vocal through her in-ear monitors each night. She explained that it was not feasible to pay a singer to perform only one song throughout an entire tour.

Strauss and Draiman performed the song together at the 2024 Sonic Temple Art & Music Festival on May 16 at Historic Crew Stadium in Columbus, Ohio.

== Track listing ==
"Dead Inside (feat. David Draiman of Disturbed)" single
No.	Title	Length
1.	"Dead Inside"	4:00

"Dead Inside" single
No.	Title	Length
1.	"Dead Inside"	4:00
2.	"Dead Inside" (instrumental)	4:00
Total length:		8:01

== Personnel ==
Credits adapted from Apple Music.

Performers

- Nita Strauss – lead guitar, rhythm guitar, bass
- David Draiman – vocals
- Josh Villalta – drums

Production

- Kile Odell – producer

== Chart performance ==
On the Billboard Mainstream Rock Airplay chart dated November 27, 2021, "Dead Inside" rose from No. 11 to No. 10. With this achievement, Strauss became the first solo woman to reach the chart's top 10 as a lead artist in nearly 26 years.

On January 10, 2022, "Dead Inside" reached No. 1 on Mediabase's Active Rock chart, overtaking Volbeat's "Shotgun Blues". Strauss was the first female solo rock artist to top the chart.

On the Billboard Mainstream Rock Airplay chart dated January 15, 2022, "Dead Inside" rose from No. 3 to No. 1, making Strauss the first solo woman to top the chart since Alannah Myles's "Black Velvet" in 1990. It also gave Strauss her first No. 1 on a Billboard songs chart.

=== Weekly charts ===
Weekly chart performance for "Dead Inside"
Chart (2021–2022)	Peak position
Canada Rock (Billboard)	29
US Rock Digital Song Sales (Billboard)	8
US Rock & Alternative Airplay (Billboard)	6
US Mainstream Rock Airplay (Billboard)	1

=== Year-end charts ===
Year-end chart performance for "Dead Inside"
Chart (2022)	Position
US Rock & Alternative Airplay (Billboard)	35
US Mainstream Rock Airplay (Billboard)	20
