= Détente (band) =

American thrash metal band

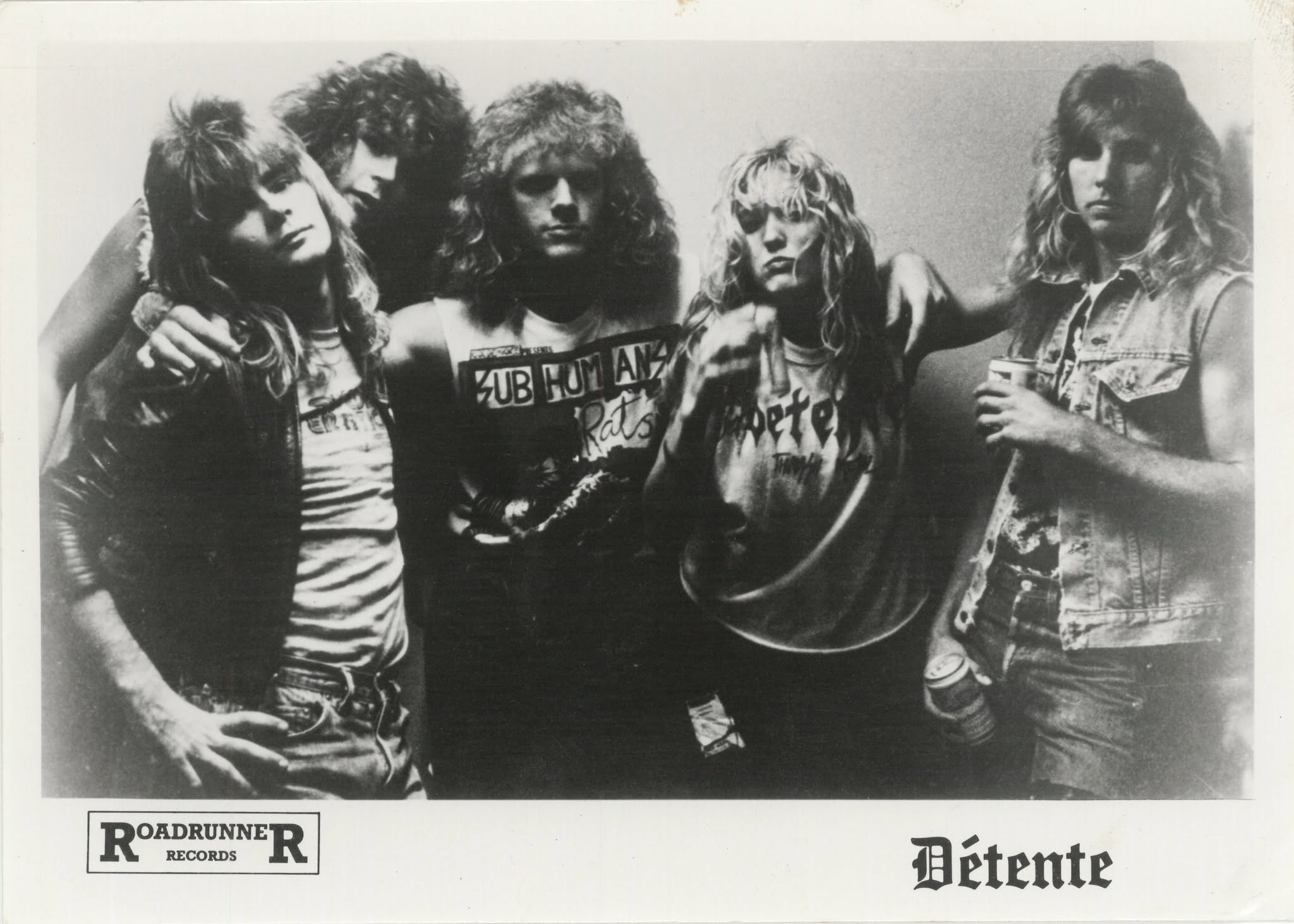
- Détente in 1985. From left to right: Ross Robinson, Caleb Quinn, Steve Hochheiser, Dawn Crosby, and Dennis Butler.

Background information
- Origin: Los Angeles, California, U.S.
- Genres: Thrash metal
- Years active: 1984–1989; 2008–2010; 2022–present
- Labels: Metal Blade; Roadrunner; Cognitive Music
- Spinoffs: Fear of God
- Members: Tiina Teal; Caleb Quinn; Steve Hochheiser; Dennis Butler
- Past members: Dawn Crosby; Ann Boleyn; Mario Parillo; Ross Robinson; Michael Carlino; George Robb; Rob "Wacko" Hunter
- Website: http://www.facebook.com/officialdetente

Détente is an American thrash metal band founded in 1984 in Los Angeles, California, United States. The group's original line-up included Dawn Crosby on vocals, Steve Hochheiser on bass, Dennis Butler on drums and Ross Robinson and Caleb Quinn on guitars,.

In 2012, the band was the subject of controversy over their 2010 song "Kill Rush", which referred to Rush Limbaugh with the conservative talk show host Sean Hannity discussing the band as part of a left-wing hate conspiracy with then US House Member Michele Bachmann.

== History ==
Détente's first album, Recognize No Authority, was released on Roadrunner Records and also licensed to Metal Blade Records in 1986. Within days of the debut album's release, the supporting tour had to be canceled when drummer and co-founder Dennis was severely burned in an industrial accident, resulting in more than three months of hospitalization. Despite the lack of touring the debut sold strongly in Europe, especially in Germany and the Netherlands.

The band split, but their singer Dawn Crosby continued with the Détente brand. Due to a legal dispute, the name Détente had to be dropped and was changed to Fear of God, who were eventually signed to Warner Bros. Records. Ross Robinson later became a producer whose credits include Korn, Sepultura, Limp Bizkit, and many other acts.

In 1987, Hochheiser and Robinson formed Catalepsy with the Canadian vocalist Veronica Ross. With Ross, singing and writing the lyrics and vocal melodies for the songs "Evil Within", "An Offering", and "Obituary Fear". The demo, recorded at Baby O' Studios in Hollywood, California, climbed to the number one spot on the WVVX-FM Underground Radio. Catalepsy continued in the studios to record three more songs with Ross singing and writing "Under the Influence", "Who Can You Trust" and "Law and Disorder". The band was set to release a new album titled Beyond the Threshold after leaving member options were exercised on Steve Hochheiser and Ross Robinson by Roadrunner Records, however, Robinson refused to record for Roadrunner due to what he thought was a lack of support for Détente. After some wrangling the band convinced Roadrunner to release them and then pursued a deal with CBS Records that ultimately fell through. Catalepsy had already self-funded recording an additional seven songs but, the time had passed, and the band members each went in new directions before the album could be released.

Dawn Crosby died in 1996 of liver failure associated with a history of alcohol and drug abuse.

In 2007 Recognize No Authority was re-released on Steve Hochheiser's own label Cognitive Records. and with new fans discovering Détente has since been repackaged into multiple editions.

The group reunited in 2008 for a series of appearances with singer Ann Boleyn of Hellion filling in for Crosby. In July, they performed at the Headbanger's Open Air Festival in Germany.

As of November, 2009, Boleyn was replaced with Tiina Teal. A new album (featuring Teal), Decline was recorded, and released in June 2010; however, the band broke up that year.

The Gauntlet listed Détente as part of their Top 10 Female Fronted Metal bands in 2011.

In December 2022, the band announced they will reunite in April 2023 to perform their album Recognize No Authority in its entirety at the Metal Threat Fest.

== Members ==
=== Current members ===
- Dennis Butler – drums (1984–1987, 2008–2010, 2022–present)
- Caleb Quinn – guitar (1985–1986, 2008–2010, 2022–present)
- Steve Hochheiser – bass (1985–1986, 2008–2010, 2022–present)
- Tiina Teal – vocals (2009–2010, 2022–present)

=== Former members ===
- Dawn Crosby – vocals (1984–1989)
- Jim Tutone – guitar (1984)
- Wilfred Rascon – guitar (1984)
- Fred Rascone – guitar (1984–1985)
- Rob Farr – bass (1984–1985)
- Ross Robinson – guitar (1985–1986)
- George Robb – bass (1986)
- Greg Cekalovich – guitar (1986–1987)
- Michael Carlino – guitar, bass (1986–1989)
- Blair Darby – bass (1989)
- Rob Hunter – drums (1989)
- Eric Alpert – drums (1989)
- Ann Boleyn – vocals (2008–2009)

== Discography ==
- Recognize No Authority (1986)
- Decline (2010)
- Decline (Extended Release) (2016)
- Official Live Bootleg (2025)
