= Anne Boleyn (disambiguation) =

Anne Boleyn (c.1501–1536) was the second wife of Henry VIII of England.

Anne Boleyn may also refer to:

== People ==
- Anne Shelton (courtier) (c.1483–1556), née Boleyn, aunt of Queen Anne Boleyn

== Arts and entertainment ==
- Anne Boleyn (play), a 2010 play by Howard Brenton
- Anne Boleyn (TV series), a 2021 series
- Anne Boleyn (The Tudors), a character in The Tudors

== See also ==
- Ann Boleyn (singer) (born 1960), American singer born Anne Hull
- Anna Boleyn, a 1920 film by Ernst Lubitsch about the royal couple
