= Toxic Voodoo =

Studio album by Fear of God
- Released: June 7, 1994
- Studio: Pro Media (Gainesville)
- Genre: Heavy metal
- Length: 45:41
- Label: Pavement
- Producer: Mark Pinske; Dawn Crosby; Fear of God

Fear of God chronology
Within the Veil (1991)	Toxic Voodoo (1994)

Professional ratings
Review scores
Source	Rating
AllMusic	1.5/5 stars
Kerrang!	3/5 stars
Hit Parader	4/5 stars
Rock Hard	9/10

Toxic Voodoo is the second and final studio album by American heavy metal band Fear of God, released on June 7, 1994, through Pavement Music.

== Track listing ==
No.	Title	Length
1.	"Beyond the Veil"	3:27
2.	"Cloud Chamber"	4:56
3.	"Swine Song"	3:38
4.	"Burnt"	3:35
5.	"Feed Time"	4:13
6.	"Mercy"	3:25
7.	"Santismo"	5:34
8.	"U.V."	5:36
9.	"Will of Evil"	4:57
10.	"Worms"	6:17
Total length:		45:41

== Personnel ==
Credits adapted from liner notes.

Fear of God

- Dawn Crosby - vocals
- Chris Kalandras - guitar
- Randby Bobizen - guitar
- Rob Michel - bass
- John Gerden - drums

Production

- Mark Pinske - production
- Dawn Crosby - co-production
- Fear of God - co-production
- David Smadbeck - keyboards (2, 8, 10)
