= Terror Squad =

Terror Squad may refer to:

- Informal name for an anti-terrorism security body
- Terror Squad (group), a hip-hop group started by Fat Joe
  - Terror Squad: The Album, the group's debut album
- Terror Squad (Artillery album)
- Terror Squad (film), a 1987 film directed by Peter Maris
- Terror Squad Productions, a hip hop and R&B record label founded by Fat Joe
- "Terror Squad", a song by Zomboy
- Terror Squad, a Canadian aboriginal gang
