= Rock City Angels =

Former rock band from Florida, United States

- Also known as: The Abusers; Delta City Rebels; Delta Rebels
- Origin: Florida, United States
- Genres: Rock
- Years active: 1981–1993; 2001–2012
- Past members: See members list
- Website: www.therockcityangels.com

Rock City Angels was an American rock band from Florida. They found only limited success, and are perhaps best known for having Johnny Depp as a guitarist before he pursued his acting career.

== History ==
The band was founded in 1981 as The Abusers by singer Bobby Bondage and original bassist Andy Panik after meeting at a screening of the documentary The Decline of Western Civilization.

Later evolving into the Rock City Angels, the band was associated with the glam rock fashion style; members grew out their hair and began wearing eyeliner, lipstick, and nail polish. Bobby Bondage adopted the alias Bobby St. Valentine. Their discography reflected this shift. Sonically, the band became an aggressive mix of hardcore punk and glam rock, marked by themes of rebellion, failed relationships, and the independent music scene. Songs such as "Cinderella in Black," "Hush Child," "Dark Angels," and "Teenage Lipstick Boys" incorporate strong melodies and power chords.

While the band developed a large local following in South Florida, members were ready to disband in the mid-1980s. At what was to be their farewell show, Ann Boleyn of New Renaissance Records offered the act a recording contract. The band then relocated to Los Angeles where they became a local fixture into the 1990s. In 1986, Bobby St. Valentine changed his name to Bobby Durango, and actor Johnny Depp, also from South Florida, joined the band as a rhythm guitarist before debuting as an actor on the police procedural television series 21 Jump Street. At this time, after signing with Worldwide Media, Geffen Records took notice and bought the band's contract from New Renaissance Records in 1986. Before the release of their debut studio album, Young Man's Blues, in 1988, the band assumed the aliases Delta City Angels and Delta Rebels due to conflict with a gospel group of the same name. However, the name was reverted prior to the album's release.

In 1990, the band began recording demos for a second album titled Lost Generation. They recorded some 80 songs, all of which were rejected by Geffen. Frustrated by Geffen's lack of interest, they went to London and recorded six songs with Thin Lizzy guitarist Brian Robertson, which Geffen also declined to support. Eventually, Geffen dropped the band. According to the band's own website, the song, "Hush Child," which appeared on their debut album, and which helped secure their deal with Geffen, was actually written by former lead guitarist Davy Lightning, but was not so credited on the album. The group formally disbanded in 1993.

New Renaissance Records released Rock City Angels in 1999. In 2001, the band reunited and began recording a third album titled Use Once & Destroy, a return to the band's punk rock and blues roots. The album remained unfinished for several years but was finally completed in 2007 and released in November 2008. Following the album's release, a new iteration of the band played shows in the Southeastern United States from June 2009–May 2012. In 2010, FNA Records released a compilation of songs originally recorded for the second record called Midnight Confessions. On June 4, 2012, SleazeRoxx.com reported that Bobby Durango had died. At the time, the band had reportedly been working on a studio album titled Devils in the Countryside due for release at the end of 2012. Throughout its lifespan, the band toured with Joan Jett, Jimmy Page, the Georgia Satellites, and played with L.A. Guns, Jetboy, The Zeroes, Flies on Fire, and Junkyard, and opened for Black Flag and Circle Jerks.

== Members ==
- Steve Oliverio — guitars
- Doug Banx — guitars
- Mike Barnes — guitars
- Mark Binko — bass
- Stuart Casson — guitars
- Matt Cloutier — guitars
- Bobby Durango / Bobby St. Valentine / Bobby Bondage — lead vocals
- Johnny Depp — rhythm guitar (1986–1987)
- Mike Dover — drums
- Adam G. — bass
- Jorge Hernandez — guitars
- Jimmy James — guitars
- Jackie D. Jukes — drums
- Adam Keller — drums
- Davy Lightning — lead guitar
- Andy Panik — bass
- Pagan Raygun — guitars
- Taggart Reid — guitars
- Brad Shaw — guitars
- Billy Starr — drums
- Kris Yates — drums

== Discography ==
Studio albums

- Young Man's Blues (Geffen, 1988)
- Use Once & Destroy (CD Baby, 2008)
- Southern Vision (CD Baby, 2018)

Compilations

- Rock City Angels (New Renaissance, 1999)
- Midnight Confessions: The Lost Recordings from 1989 to 1992 (FNA, 2010)
- Hollywood Rocks
- The Florida Explosion
