= Within the Veil =

Studio album by Fear of God
- Released: January 29, 1991
- Studio: The Fortress (Hollywood)
- Genre: Heavy metal; gothic metal; thrash metal
- Length: 46:50
- Label: Warner Bros.
- Producer: Dawn Crosby; Michael Carlino; Pat Regan

Fear of God chronology
Within the Veil (1991)	Toxic Voodoo (1994)

Professional ratings
Review scores
Source	Rating
AllMusic	4/5 stars
The Boston Phoenix	3/4 stars
Chicago Tribune	3.5/4 stars
Entertainment Weekly	A
Kerrang!	4/5 stars
Metal Forces	95/100
Metal Hammer	4/5
Metal Rules	5/5
Rock Hard	9/10
Sputnikmusic	3.5/5

Within the Veil is the debut studio album by American heavy metal band Fear of God, released on January 29, 1991, through Warner Bros. Records.

== Track listing ==
All tracks are written by Dawn Crosby and Michael Carlino.

No.	Title	Length
1.	"All That Remains"	3:52
2.	"Betrayed"	6:15
3.	"Emily"	4:25
4.	"Red to Grey"	6:08
5.	"Diseased"	4:08
6.	"Wasted Time"	6:48
7.	"Love's Death"	4:18
8.	"White Door"	5:00
9.	"Drift"	5:52
Total length:		46:50

== Personnel ==
Credits adapted from liner notes.

Fear of God

- Dawn Crosby - vocals
- Michael Carlino - guitars
- Blair Darby - bass
- Steve Cordova - drums

Production

- Dawn Crosby - production
- Michael Carlino - production
- Pat Regan - production, engineering
- Andy Wallace - mixing
- Howie Weinberg - mastering
