= Fear of God (band) =

American metal band

Fear Of God
- Fear of God in 1991. L–R: Blair Darby, Michael Carlino, Dawn Crosby, and Steve Cordova

Background information
- Also known as: Fog (1996)
- Origin: Los Angeles, California, U.S.
- Genres: Thrash metal, speed metal, gothic metal (early)
- Years active: 1989–1996
- Labels: Warner Bros.; Pavement
- Spinoff of: Detente
- Past members: Dawn Crosby; Michael Carlino; Blair Darby; Steve Cordova; Dennis Butler; John Grden; Bill Hayden; Mike Schafer; Tony Mallory

Fear of God was an American extreme metal band from Los Angeles, formed in 1991 by members of thrash metal band Detente, including vocalist Dawn Crosby. it was originally a gothic band in its early roots. Following Crosby's death in 1996, the band continued to perform and record under the name Fog.

== Discography ==
- Within the Veil (1991)
- Toxic Voodoo (1994)
- Killing the Pain EP (1995)
