= Nita Strauss =

American guitarist (born 1986)

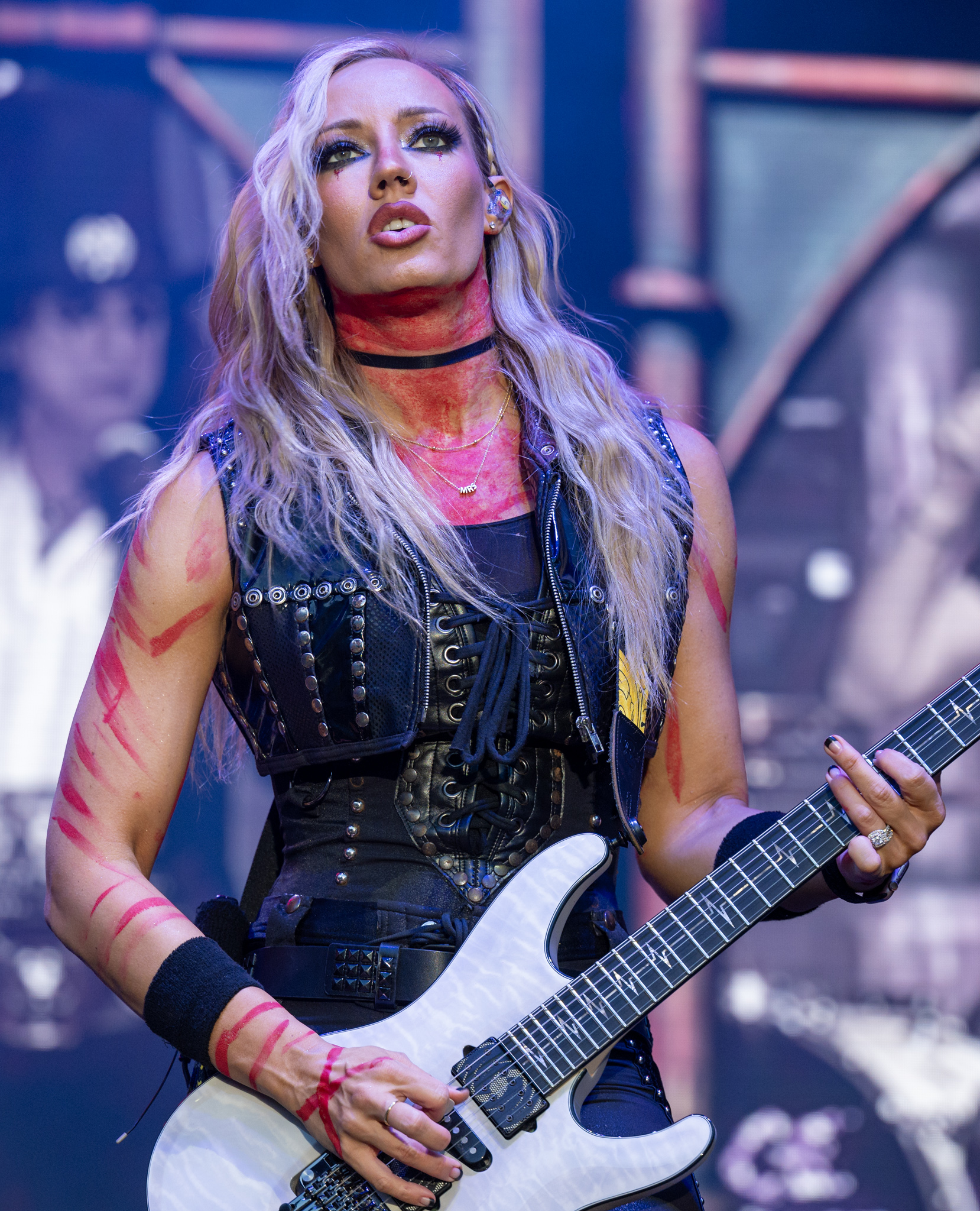
- Strauss with Alice Cooper in 2024

Background information
- Also known as: Mega Murray, Hurricane Nita, The Hurricane
- Born: Vinita Sandhya Strauss; December 7, 1986 (age 39); Los Angeles, California, U.S.
- Genres: Heavy metal; hard rock; tribute music, instrumental metal; deathcore
- Occupation: Guitarist
- Years active: 2003–present
- Labels: Sumerian; Powerslave
- Member of: Alice Cooper; We Start Wars; The Starbreakers
- Formerly of: As Blood Runs Black; The Iron Maidens; Femme Fatale
- Spouse: Josh Villalta (m. 2024)
- Website: nitastrauss.com

Vinita Sandhya Strauss (born December 7, 1986) is an American rock musician. She is currently a guitarist for Alice Cooper, has also been a touring guitarist for Demi Lovato and has a successful career as a solo artist. Strauss is regularly featured on the covers of worldwide print magazines including Guitar World and Guitar Player, was the first female signature artist with Ibanez guitars, and became the first female rock solo artist in 32 years to hit number one on Billboard's Mainstream Rock chart.

== Career ==
Strauss was born on December 7, 1986 in Los Angeles. She started touring with her own band Lia-Fail as a teenager, leaving high school in her junior year to pursue music full time; the band included future world champion boxer Mikaela Mayer. Although initially known for her work with Iron Maiden all-female tribute band The Iron Maidens, Strauss' career has included performing with several rock and metal ensembles including As Blood Runs Black, Consume the Fire, Femme Fatale, and the video-game supergroup Critical Hit.

In 2014, Strauss was the official in-house guitarist for the Los Angeles Kiss (LA Kiss), the arena football team owned by Paul Stanley and Gene Simmons of Kiss. The house band played the national anthem and provided additional music during the games.

In June 2014, Strauss was hired to replace Orianthi as Alice Cooper's touring guitarist for the remaining 2014 tour dates. She toured with Alice Cooper until July 2022, when she announced her departure from the touring band. A few days later, Strauss announced that she had joined Demi Lovato's backing band as a touring guitarist. On March 3, 2023, Alice Cooper announced that Strauss would return for the 2023 tour.

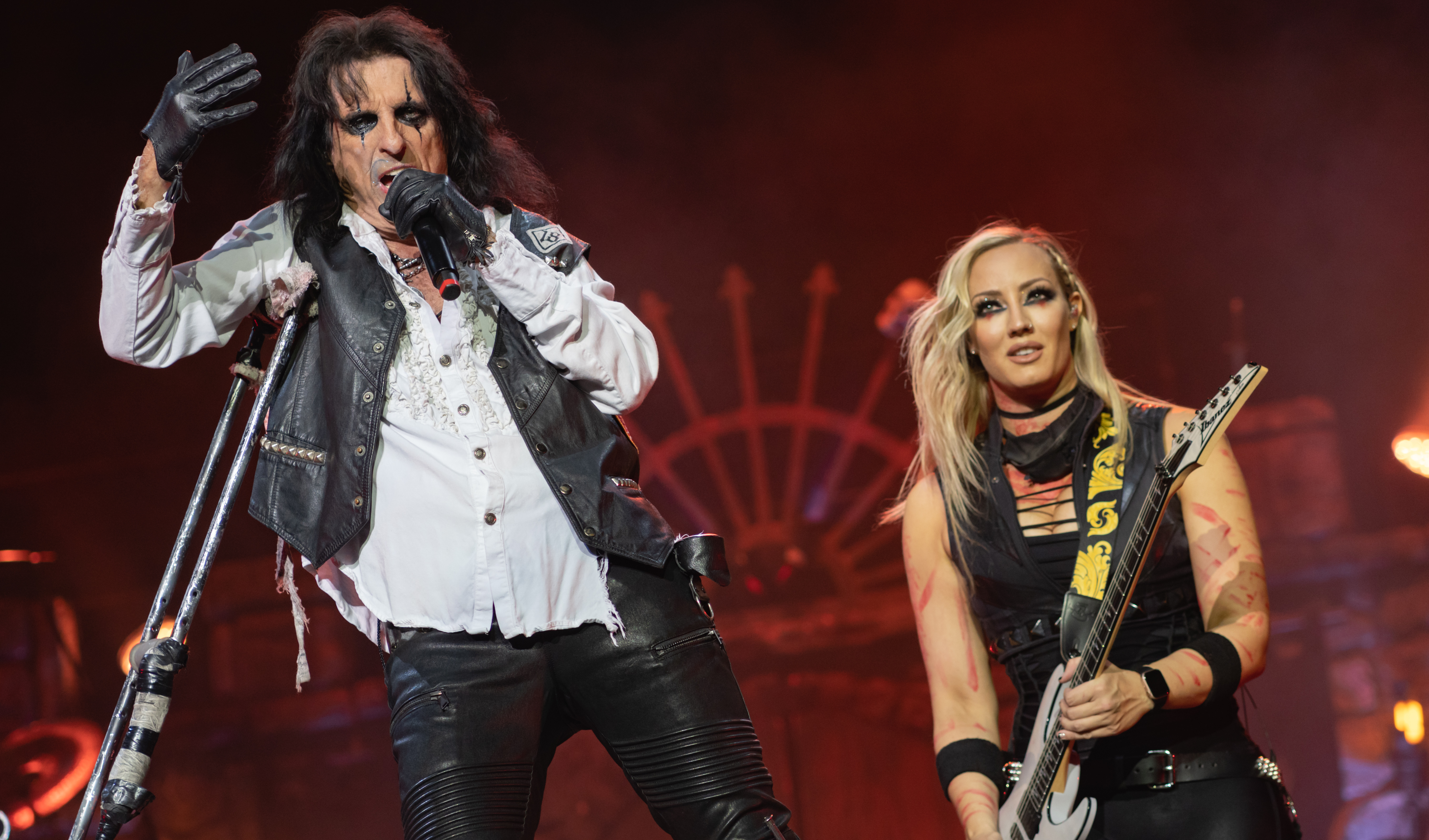
Strauss performing with Alice Cooper in 2022

Strauss is featured as the main guitarist for seven songs on the Docker's Guild album The Heisenberg Diaries – Book A: Sounds of Future Past, released on January 21, 2016.

Strauss appeared in the 2017 Netflix documentary Hired Gun.

On 2 April 2026, Alice Cooper announced that Strauss would not have been part of his supporting band for the 2026–2027 tour, for she had decided earlier in the year to take a maternity leave from live performance. Contextually, Cooper announced British guitarist Anna Cara as temporary replacement for Strauss.

=== Solo artist ===
In April 2018, Strauss launched a Kickstarter campaign for her debut solo record Controlled Chaos. The campaign was successfully funded in two hours and eventually raised eight times its initial goal. Strauss produced the record herself, including the majority of the engineering work, and played all of the guitars and bass on the record.

After the record was completed, Strauss signed with Sumerian Records to release and distribute the album worldwide. The first single, "Our Most Desperate Hour", was released in September 2018 along with pre-orders for the record on both CD and vinyl, with the vinyl completely selling out before release. Controlled Chaos debuted on the Billboard charts at No. 1 Top New Artist, No. 3 Label Independent, No. 4 Top Hard Music, No. 8 Top Rock, No. 8 Top Internet, No. 20 Top albums, and No. 7 on the iTunes Rock chart. The album's second single, "Mariana Trench", was chosen by WWE as the official theme for NXT TakeOver: WarGames (2018).

=== Special appearances ===
Strauss performed "The Star Spangled Banner" at the 2017 Rock on the Range in Columbus, Ohio. She also performed "The Star Spangled Banner" for the 2022 WISE Power 400 at Auto Club Speedway.

Strauss was introduced to World Wrestling Entertainment by her boyfriend Josh Villalta. She initially started watching because it was important to him, but quickly became a fan herself. Strauss started performing live at WWE pay-per-view events in 2018. In April 2018, Strauss played Shinsuke Nakamura's entrance music at WrestleMania 34 in New Orleans in front of an audience of 78,000 fans and millions more who watched the worldwide streaming event. On October 28, Strauss performed with Lzzy Hale at WWE Evolution. Her original song "Mariana Trench" was chosen by Triple H as the official theme for NXT TakeOver: WarGames.

== Recognition ==
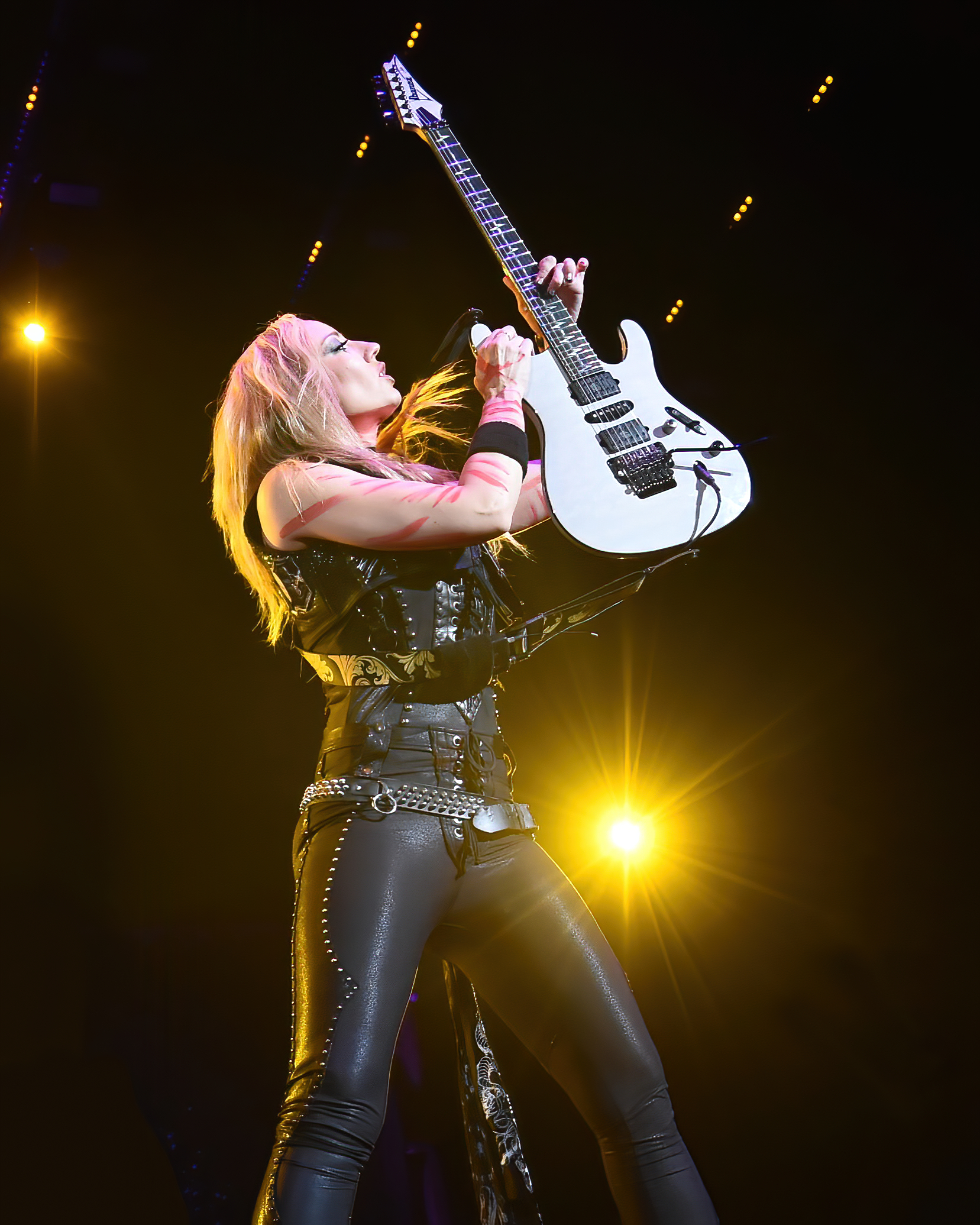
Strauss in West Palm Beach, Florida in 2023

In January 2018, Strauss became the first ever female Ibanez signature artist with her own model guitar, the Ibanez JIVA10. DiMarzio later released their Pandemonium humbuckers, signature pickups that were developed especially for her JIVA Ibanez guitar.

On January 26, 2019, Strauss was honored at the 7th Annual She Rocks Awards with the "Inspire Award", presented to her by Nick Bowcott and her personal hero, Steve Vai.

On January 9, 2022, Strauss became the first female rock solo artist in 32 years to hit number one on Billboard's Mainstream Rock chart with her song "Dead Inside".

Her solo on "The Wolf You Feed" was voted by Guitar World readers as the 6th best guitar solo of 2022.

== Teacher and mentor ==
Strauss teaches guitar playing and has gone on teaching tours offering master classes in the US, Canada, UK, Europe, South America, and Asia. She has written articles and recorded companion videos for Guitar World and Premier Guitar magazines.

Strauss and fellow musicians Rabea Massaad and Plini were selected as celebrity judges to choose the "2019 Young Guitarist of the Year" at the UK Guitar Show.

== Personal life ==
Strauss claims to be a descendant of Austrian composer Johann Strauss through her father, although she is not listed on J. Strauss's known family tree. The site, however, states (in German): "Illegitimate children, like the descendants of Johann Strauss I and Emilie Trampusch, are – as a rule – not part of this diagram". In 2026, Strauss remarked: "A couple of years ago someone did a deep dive into the genealogy side of things and said it [her descent from Johann Strauss] wasn't true… But even if it ends up not being real, I'm glad I grew up thinking it – it gives you a sense of purpose, the idea you're part of this lineage."

In 2023, Strauss became engaged to drummer Josh Villalta. On May 4, 2024, the couple married in Los Angeles.

In January 2026, Strauss revealed that she was expecting a child. In June 2026, Strauss and her husband welcomed their first son, born on May 28. The child is named Maxwell James Villalta.

=== Los Angeles Rams ===
Strauss is an avid fan of the Los Angeles Rams and frequently appears at Rams games at SoFi Stadium, performing interludes or playing riffs out to the stadium to start crowd chants. Strauss played "America the Beautiful" at the Rams' Salute to Service game in November 2018. Following the Rams' victory in Super Bowl LVI, Strauss was awarded with a Super Bowl ring as an honorary part of the organization.

=== Health and fitness ===
Strauss is a fitness enthusiast, practicing strength training, Muay Thai, and Brazilian jiu-jitsu, and posts blogs about fitness-issues on social media. She has been featured in Muscle & Fitness and Bodybuilding.com. In 2019, Strauss launched the Nita Strauss: Body Shred fitness challenge, with a companion e-book titled Body Shred: Your Guide to Feeling and Looking like a Rock Star.

== Discography ==
Strauss has recorded with Alice Cooper, Jamie Christopherson, Critical Hit, Docker's Guild, FB1964, Metal Allegiance, Kane Roberts and We Start Wars. She has been featured on albums by Maxxxwell Carlisle, Tina Guo and Angel Vivaldi, as well as the all-female compilation album She Rocks. She has played on dozens of albums, trailers and soundtracks, including Heroes of the Storm and Metal Gear Rising: Revengeance. Strauss released her first instrumental solo album, Controlled Chaos, on November 16, 2018.

Year	Artist	Album	Tracks	Credits
2009	Kill Slowly	—	Louder Than Words; Let Go; Empty Promises	Guitar
2013	Consume the Fire	—	Empowered; Dead Man Walking; Everlasting Sky; Death of an Icon; There's Only Today	Guitar
2013	Maxxxwell Carlisle	Full Metal Thunder	The Power of Metal Compels Me (feat. Nita Strauss)	Guitar
2013	Jamie Christopherson	Metal Gear Rising: Revengeance	The Stains Of Time (Maniac Agenda Mix)	Guitar
2013	Critical Hit	Volume One	Tetris Main Theme; Angry Birds Main Theme; Legends Of Azeroth; Zelda's Lullaby; Halo 2 Main Theme; Pokémon Main Theme; Bowser's Castle; To Zanarkand; Hikari; Battle for New York; Streets Of Whiterun; Sons Of Liberty	Guitar
2015	Glenn Stafford and Jason Hayes	Heroes of the Storm	Soundtrack	Guitar
2015	Maxxxwell Carlisle	Visions of Speed and Thunder	The Power of Metal Compels Me (feat. Nita Strauss)	Guitar
2015	Tina Guo	Cello Metal	The Trooper (Iron Maiden)	Lead guitar
2015	Docker's Guild	The Heisenberg Diaries, Book A: Sounds Of Future Past	Flash Gordon Suite; Barbarella; Suspension; When The Wind Blows; The Never Ending Story; UFO Main Theme; Dune Suite	Guitar
2017	We Start Wars	—	The Animal Inside	Guitar
2017	She Rocks	Volume 1: A Collection Of Kick-Ass Guitar Goddesses	Pandemonium	Guitar
2017	Alice Cooper	Paranormal	No More Mr. Nice Guy; Under My Wheels; Billion Dollar Babies; Feed My Frankenstein; Only Women Bleed; School's Out	Guitar, backing vocals
2017	FB1964	Störtebeker	Hexenkessel	Guitar solo
2017	Angel Vivaldi	Synapse	Serotonin (feat. Nita Strauss)	Guitar
2018	Alice Cooper	The Sound of A	The Black Widow; Public Animal #9; Is It My Body; Cold Ethyl	Guitar, backing vocals
2018	Alice Cooper	A Paranormal Evening With Alice Cooper at the Olympia Paris	Brutal Planet; No More Mr. Nice Guy; Under My Wheels; Department Of Youth; Pain; Billion Dollar Babies; The World Needs Guts; Woman Of Mass Distraction; Poison; Halo Of Flies; Feed My Frankenstein; Cold Ethyl; Only Women Bleed; Paranoiac Personality; Ballad Of Dwight Fry; Killer; I Love The Dead; I'm Eighteen; School's Out; Another Brick in the Wall, Pt. 2 (Pink Floyd)	Guitar, backing vocals
2018	Metal Allegiance	Volume II: Power Drunk Majesty	King with a Paper Crown	Guitar
2018	Nita Strauss	Controlled Chaos	"Prepare for War"; "Alegria"; "Our Most Desperate Hour"; "Mariana Trench"; "Here With You"; "The Stillness at the End"; "The Quest"; "Hope Grows"; "Lion Among Wolves"; "Pandemonium 2.0"; "The Show Must Go On" (Queen)	Guitar, bass
2019	Kane Roberts	The New Normal	King of the World	Guitar
2022	Docker's Guild	The Mystic Technocracy - Season 2: The Age of Entropy	S.O.S. Spazio 1999 (bonus track)	Guitar
2023	Nita Strauss	The Call of the Void	1. Summer Storm; 2. The Wolf You Feed (feat. Alissa White-Gluz); 3. Digital Bullets (feat. Chris Motionless); 4. Through the Noise (feat. Lzzy Hale); 5. Consume the Fire; 6. Dead Inside (feat. David Draiman); 7. Victorious (feat. Dorothy); 8. Scorched; 9. Momentum; 10. The Golden Trail (feat. Anders Fridén); 11. Winner Takes All (feat. Alice Cooper); 12. Monster (feat. Lilith Czar); 13. Kintsugi; 14. Surfacing (feat. Marty Friedman)	Guitar, Bass
2023	Demi Lovato	Revamped	La La Land (Rock Version)	Guitar

=== Singles ===
Title	Year	Peak chart positions	Album
Title	Year	US Main.	Album
"Dead Inside" (featuring David Draiman)	2021	1	The Call of the Void
"Victorious"(featuring Dorothy)	2023	16	The Call of the Void

=== Other appearances ===
Title	Year	Band	Album
"1979"	2026	The Smashing Pumpkins	Sending Hearts To All My Dearies: A Tribute To The Smashing Pumpkins

== Live band ==
- Josh Villalta – drums
- Johnny D Young – rhythm guitar
- Katt Scarlett – keyboards
- Kasey Karlsen – vocals (2023–present)

== Filmography ==
Television
Year	Title	Role	Notes
2021	Paradise City	Val Wolf	TV spinoff of American Satan

== See also ==
- Femme Fatale
- The Iron Maidens
