= The Call of the Void (album) =

Studio album by Nita Strauss
- Released: 7 July 2023
- Studio: various
- Genre: Rock
- Length: 59:05
- Label: Sumerian
- Producer: Kile Odell

Nita Strauss chronology
Controlled Chaos (2018)	The Call of the Void (2023)

The Call of the Void is the second studio album by American rock guitarist Nita Strauss. Sumerian released the album on 7 July 2023. Notable collaborators on the album include: Alice Cooper, David Draiman, Alissa White-Gluz, Anders Fridén, Lzzy Hale, and Chris Motionless.

The Call of The Void was released both in physical and digital formats, with the former including 14 songs. The latter contains 22 tracks, thanks to eight additional instrumental tracks. Several tracks from the record were released as singles before the full album's debut in July 2023. The singles include "Dead Inside" in 2021, and "The Golden Trail" and "Winner Takes All" in early 2023.

== Background ==
Strauss explains about her new album: "Some pieces of music come into the world gracefully and easily. This album is not one of them! The Call of the Void was born kicking and screaming, a labour of love for sure, but also of blood, sweat, and plenty of tears. I couldn’t be more proud of the end result. Making this album helped me learn and grow so much as a musician and songwriter and I’m excited to finally unleash it on the world. I wanted the follow up to Controlled Chaos to be exciting, new, and fresh, to take listeners to a new place and take myself somewhere new as an artist too."

She also commented on the album's title: "Have you ever been at the top of a high building and had the fleeting thought,...I could jump right now?"

== Reception ==
Professional ratings
Review scores
Source	Rating
Blabbermouth.net	8.5/10
Classic Rock	3.5/5 stars
Distorted Sound	7/10
laut.de	4/5 stars

Anne Erickson of Blabbermouth.net wrote: "With all the modern rock collabs, "The Call of the Void" has a bevy of potential active rock radio hits, making this a set that could launch Strauss to the next level of rock stardom. Even so, the instrumentals are still where she shines brightest, as she is able to truly express emotion through her music. "The Call of the Void" leaves plenty of options open for her, as she could continue with making radio-friendly, modern rock numbers or play into her instrumental leanings. Either way, it will be exciting to see what Strauss does next."

Essi Belerian of Classic Rock noted: "Current Alice Cooper guitarist Nita Strauss seems to be in constant demand, yet has somehow found time to record this second solo album amid her various day jobs. Following a well-trodden path for star guitarists, The Call Of The Void is a vehicle for immaculate shredding allied to a host of impressive vocal talent."

== Track listing ==
All tracks are written by Johnny Andrews, Tommy Henriksen, Zach Williams.

No.	Title	Length
1.	"Summer Storm"	4:32
2.	"The Wolf You Feed" (featuring Alissa White-Gluz, vocals)	3:52
3.	"Digital Bullets" (featuring Chris Motionless, vocals)	3:58
4.	"Through the Noise" (featuring Lzzy Hale, vocals)	3:20
5.	"Consume the Fire"	4:00
6.	"Dead Inside" (featuring David Draiman, vocals)	3:58
7.	"Victorious" (featuring Dorothy, vocals)	3:42
8.	"Scorched"	5:26
9.	"Momentum"	4:19
10.	"The Golden Trail" (featuring Anders Fridén, vocals)	4:41
11.	"Winner Takes All" (featuring Alice Cooper, vocals)	3:26
12.	"Monster" (featuring Lilith Czar, vocals)	3:28
13.	"Kintsugi"	4:55
14.	"Surfacing" (featuring Jacob Umansky (bass), Marty Friedman (guitars))	5:37
Total length:		59:05

== Personnel ==
Band

- Nita Strauss – lead guitar, rhythm guitar, bass
- Kile Odell – rhythm guitar, bass, producing, engineering
- Josh Villalta – drums
- Katt Scarlett – keyboards

Production

- Eddie Kepner – artwork
- Justin Shturtz – mastering
- Nick Sampson – mixing

== Charts ==
Chart performance for The Call of the Void
Chart (2023)	Peak position
UK Albums (Official Charts)	53
