= Dance with the devil =

Dance with the Devil may refer to:

- Dance with the Devil (film) or Perdita Durango, a 1997 Spanish film
- Dance with the Devil (EP), a 2024 EP by Delain
- "Dance with the Devil" (Immortal Technique song)
- "Dance with the Devil" (instrumental), a 1973 solo drum instrumental by Cozy Powell
- "Dance with the Devil", an instrumental by UB40 from UB40
- "Dance with the Devil", a song by Breaking Benjamin from Phobia
- "Dance with the Devil", a song by The Sounds from Something to Die For
- "Dance with the Devil", a song by Katy Perry from Witness
- "Dance with the Devil", the book written by David Bagby which includes the experience of the murder of Zachary Turner.
- "Dance with the Devil", a 2020 album by Burning Witches
- "Dance with the Devil", a song from the musical The Witches of Eastwick

== See also ==
- Dancing with the Devil (disambiguation)
- Dance with Devils, a 2015 Japanese anime television series
