= When Death Comes =

Studio album by Artillery
- Released: 15 June 2009
- Genre: Thrash metal
- Length: 53:15
- Label: Metal Mind Productions
- Producer: Søren Andersen

Artillery chronology
B.A.C.K. (1999)	When Death Comes (2009)	My Blood (2011)

Professional ratings
Review scores
Source	Rating
AllMusic	4/5 stars

When Death Comes is the fifth studio album by Danish thrash metal band Artillery. It was released in 2009 via Metal Mind Productions. It is their first recording since their second breakup from 2000 to 2007, and their first full-length studio album since B.A.C.K., which was released ten years earlier.

== Track listing ==
All tracks are written by Morten Stützer, Søren Adamsen except where noted

No.	Title	Writer(s)	Length
1.	"When Death Comes"		5:54
2.	"Upon My Cross I Crawl"		5:28
3.	"10.000 Devils"		5:20
4.	"Rise Above It All"		5:32
5.	"Sandbox Philosophy"	Michael Stützer, Søren Adamsen	4:44
6.	"Delusions of Grandeur"	Morten Stützer, John Mathiassen	5:10
7.	"Not a Nightmare"		5:30
8.	"Damned Religion"		5:10
9.	"Uniform"	Morten Stützer, John Mathiassen	5:01
10.	"The End"		5:22
Total length:			53:15

Bonus tracks

European/U.S. digipak
No.	Title	Length
11.	"Refuse to Live (Part 2)"
12.	"Warhead"

Japanese release
No.	Title	Length
11.	"Chaos Ride"

== Personnel ==
- Søren Adamsen – vocals
- Morten Stützer – guitars
- Michael Stützer – guitars
- Peter Thorslund – bass
- Carsten Nielsen – drums
