= Seann Scott =

American drummer

- Also known as: Phate
- Origin: Albuquerque, New Mexico, U.S.
- Genres: Hard rock, heavy metal, glam metal, indie rock, industrial metal
- Occupation: Drummer
- Instruments: Drums, vocals,
- Years active: 1996–present

Seann Scott is a rock/metal drummer who has played in various bands, and continues to be active in multiple current acts.

== Music career ==
Scott moved from Albuquerque, New Mexico to San Diego, California in the late 1980s and played in several local bands before moving to Los Angeles in the early 1990s. Following several more Hollywood bands the first to commercially release a CD was the metal band Mother Mercy. Scott created his own record company "SS Records" based in Oceanside, California and financed the production of the band's first CD "Love at First Bite". Followed later by Mother Mercy's 2nd CD "Dancing with the Devil" which was not mass-produced initially, but was eventually re-mastered, with some track changes, and released by Perris Records. Scott and the band Mother Mercy also contributed the track "Girls, Girls, Girls" on the Mötley Crüe tribute CD "Kickstart my Heart" with portions of the proceeds to the Skylar Neil Memorial Foundation for Cancer Research.

Eventually Scott parted ways with Mother Mercy and joined "Suicide Alley", as one of the original members, but he separated from that band before they recorded their CD on Delinquent Records. He then played in the Hollywood glam metal band "Revlon Red" from 2001 to 2011, releasing two recordings in that time period. Around the same time Scott joined the Los Angeles-based metal band Hellion (which had achieved some fame in the late 80's including several videos on MTV) releasing one recording on Massacre Records in 2003. It was announced in 2013 that Hellion will be recording with a new lineup.

Scott then joined the Orange County based Indie/Punk band "Kill Your Generation" in 2008 which continues to be active in Orange County, CA, and the Hollywood industrial metal band "De-Tached" in 2013, which disbanded in 2019.

Following the close interest in Mötley Crüe, Scott played the part of Tommy Lee in a Mötley Crüe tribute band called "Children of the Beast" from 2004 to 2006. Which included Vince Neil's son Neil Wharton as a guest vocalist. Scott later joined another Mötley Crüe tribute band called "Motley 2" in 2016 touring the United States and Canada. He left the band in September 2021.

Scott cites Kiss, Judas Priest, Rob Zombie, Metallica, and Mötley Crüe (specifically Tommy Lee) as his musical influences.

== Acting career ==
Scott's most notable television appearance was in the nationally televised NetZero "Candidate Zero" series of commercials starring Rob Heubel aired during the 2004 United States Presidential campaign. He appeared in two of the commercials in the series along with two other members of his band "Revlon Red". The band also filmed a series of commercials for VH-1 that were not broadcast, but footage from the filming was used for the MythBusters episode "Driving in Heels". In the scene the band is portrayed as having "trashed" a hotel room, and gluing items to the walls and ceiling. Scott is shown lifting a TV over his head and smashing it on the ground.

He also acted in the pilot program for a Columbia/Universal TV show titled Dear Doughboy, created by Hopwood Depree and directed by Penelope Spheeris, which was billed as a reality/mockumentary for the WB network.

== Personal life ==
Seann Scott was rumoured to have dated Emi Canyn (who later married Mick Mars of Mötley Crüe). He later dated The Iron Maidens bass player Wanda Ortiz for many years starting in early 1996. They separated in late 2008.

== Associated acts ==
- Mother Mercy
- Suicide Alley
- Reactor
- Tracer
- Children of the Beast – Mötley Crüe tribute (2004–2006)
- Revlon Red (2001–2011)
  – Revlon Dead, the Halloween variation of Revlon Red.
- Hellion (2002–2013)
- De-Tached (2013–2019)
- Motley 2 – Mötley Crüe tribute (2016–2021)
- Kill Your Generation (2008–present)

== Discography ==
Mother Mercy

- Love at First Bite (1997) SS Records
- Dancing with the Devil (2001) SS Records
- Dancing with the Devil (reissue, 2003) Perris Records

Suicide Alley

- Nothing To Lose Cassette single (1997, Delinquent Records)

Hellion

- Will Not Go Quietly (2003, Massacre Records)

Revlon Red

- Our Bubbleglam Era (2006)
- The Singles EP (2009)

Revlon Dead

- Glampyre Blood Zombies – Live Undead EP (2009)

Kill Your Generation

- Take Your Time (2013)

De-Tached (as AKA- Phate)

- Fates Reflections (2015)
- Void of Silence (2016)

=== Compilations ===
- Indie-pendence Day C3 (1997, Delinquent Records)
  - Single track – Nothing to Lose by Suicide Alley
- Kickstart My Heart – A Tribute to Mötley Crüe (1999, Pulse Records)
  - Single track – Girls, Girls, Girls by Mother Mercy
- Hollywood Hairspray Vol. 2 (2003, Perris Records)
  - Single track – Rock City Boys by Mother Mercy
- Lost Anarchy Volume 1: BUY OR DIE! (2005, Demons in Exile Records)
  - Single track – Hollywood by Revlon Red

== Filmography ==
=== Television ===
- Dear Doughboy pilot (2000)
- NetZero Election Night commercial (2004)
- NetZero Names commercial (2004)
- MythBusters Driving in Heels episode– part of band trashing a motel room.

=== Music videos ===
List of Seann Scott's music video appearances
Year	Song	Artist
1997	"Love at First Bite"	Mother Mercy
1998	"Bad Boys in Black"	Mother Mercy
2002	"Break Me"	Revl'on Red
2004	"Hollywood"	Revl'on Red
2016	"Waste"	De-Tached
