= Hellion (band) =

American heavy metal band

- Origin: Los Angeles, California, U.S.
- Genres: Heavy metal, power metal
- Years active: 1982–present
- Label: New Renaissance Records
- Members: Ann Boleyn; Simon Wright; Maxxxwell Carlisle
- Past members: Alan Barlam; Tim Kelley; Peyton Tuthill; Rik Fox; Bill Sweet; Alex Campbell; Dave Dutton; Rex Tennyson; Teddy Days; Sean Kelley; Greg Pecka; Bill Bruce; Chris Kessler; Chet Thompson; Ray Schenck; Glenn Cannon; Seann Scott
- Website: www.hellion.us

Hellion is an American heavy metal band formed in Los Angeles in 1982. The band's original lineup included Ann Boleyn (vocals), Ray Schenck (guitar), Sean Kelley (drums) and Peyton Tuthill (bass). Hellion continues to perform today with different band members.

== History ==
=== Early days ===
The band started as a cover group, covering songs by the likes of Ozzy Osbourne, Scorpions and AC/DC. The group's first performances (or "Mega-Parties") were held at a mansion in Tujunga, California which was occupied by Ann Boleyn. While residing at the mansion, Hellion recorded a homemade demo cassette, which resulted in the band gaining attention in both underground and mainstream music magazines. In late 1982, Hellion was approached by Mystic Records, a Hollywood-based punk label, who wanted to include "Nightmares in Daylight" on a compilation album. Several weeks prior to the recording session, Peyton Tuthill left the band, citing Ann Boleyn's involvement in the occult arts as his reason. Tuthill has since become a minister. Following Tuthill's departure, bass player Rik Fox (who was a founding member of W.A.S.P.) was a number of top musicians who auditioned for Hellion, and was invited to return for a second round of auditions. A few days later, however, Fox, was offered a gig with Steeler. At the last minute Brian West of London, who had played in the Seattle-based band, Power Program, with Ann Boleyn, was brought in for the recording session which took place on New Year's Eve.

=== Recordings ===
Mystic Records released Hellion's first single, which included "Black Night" by Deep Purple in addition to a Hellion original entitled "Driving Hard For You" in early 1983. Another Hellion song, "Nightmares In Daylight", was recorded for inclusion on Mystic Records' compilation LP entitled, The Sound of Hollywood Girls. After Hellion's single gained positive reviews, Mystic Records offered Hellion a full record deal. When Hellion refused, Mystic Records released "Nightmares in Daylight", on a split single with another female-fronted band, Bitch, who had also decided against signing a full record deal with Mystic.

By 1983, Hellion had solidified their line-up with the addition of bassist Bill Sweet and a second lead-guitarist, Alan Barlam. During the summer of 1983, Hellion was voted by readers of L.A. Street Scene Magazine as the Best Local Heavy Metal Act. America's major record companies were in the process of signing dozens of hard rock and metal bands. Although Hellion frequently headlined shows at The Troubadour, The Whiskey, and other Los Angeles venues and frequently opened for national acts, the major record labels ignored Hellion. Van Halen's manager, Ed Leffler, and others, however offered to make singer Ann Boleyn into "the next Pat Benatar" on the condition that she have cosmetic surgery and leave Hellion.

In an attempt to gain a major label recording contract the group entered Fiddler's Studio in Hollywood to record a demo. The band recorded the basic tracks in one evening and recorded the guitar solos, vocals, and mixed on the following night. After destroying two separate cassette recorders while making multiple copies of the demo to sell at shows, Hellion decided to press the recording onto vinyl and formed Bongus Lodus Records.

After Hellion's self-titled 12-inch made its way onto the import charts in Kerrang!, Sounds and Aardschok magazines, London-based record company Music for Nations offered the band a recording contract and gave the band money to record two more songs which were added to the earlier recording to make the six-song Hellion Mini-LP. Tracks No. 2 through No. 5 are from that release. The Hellion Mini-LP was released in January 1984 and climbed to No. 6 on the UK rock chart in Kerrang! and Sounds. The record was voted No. 2 EP of the Year by the journalists at Kerrang! magazine. Hellion thereafter performed in England and performed a number of concerts in the US supporting Alcatrazz, which featured former Rainbow vocalist Graham Bonnett and Swedish guitarist Yngwie Malmsteen.

=== Ronnie James Dio takes band under his wing ===
In mid-1984, after hearing a live recording of one of Hellion's concerts with Alcatrazz, Ronnie James Dio and his wife Wendy Dio, along with her business partner Curt Lorraine, offered to produce and manage Hellion. In July 1984, Hellion entered Sound City Recording Studios in Van Nuys, California, with famed engineer, Angelo Arcuri, and with Ronnie James Dio producing. One song from those sessions, "Run For Your Life", was later released on Roadrunner Records, and received substantial radio airplay on KMET and KNAC, as well as abroad. Throughout 1984, through 1985, Hellion performed as a support act with Dio, Whitesnake, W.A.S.P., Rough Cutt, and other national acts. The band, however, failed to attain a record deal in the United States.

=== Ann Boleyn ===
In early 1985, Hellion's male members decided to split from vocalist Ann Boleyn and replace her with a male singer, Richard Parrico. After Boleyn threatened to sue, Hellion's male members and Parrico adopted the moniker Burn. Both Burn and Hellion continued to be managed by Wendy Dio and Curt Lorraine of Niji Management. Soon after the split Dana Strum produced a demo for the newly formed band Burn, with the financial assistance of Curt Lorraine. In addition to writing new music, Burn also performed and recorded songs that had been previously sung by Ann Boleyn, but changed Boleyn's lyrics and melodies.

Boleyn soon gathered a new Hellion line-up featuring ex-Romeo guitarist Chet Thompson, ex-Lion bassist Alex Campbell, and ex-Dokken drummer Greg Pecka. After insisting on releasing a new record with or without a major record label, Hellion was dropped from Niji Management in about 1986. A few months later, the new Hellion began recording demos at Brian Elliot Studios in North Hollywood. One song from those sessions, entitled "The Hand", appears on the California's Best Metal compilation album, which was released by Greenworld Records. A few months later, Hellion entered Total Access Recording Studios in Redondo Beach, California, with record producer Ken Scott. Ken Scott's then-wife, Patience Scott, acted as Hellion's manager.

Before the demo was fully completed, marital problems surfaced between Hellion's manager Patience Scott, and producer Ken Scott. Due to the split, Ken and Patience Scott were unable to continue working together. Ken Scott's memories of recording with Hellion are chronicled in his book entitled From Abbey Road To Ziggy Stardust which was released in 2012. Tracks from Hellion's demo sessions with Ken Scott have been released in various forms as bootlegs.

After working with Ken Scott, Hellion entered Baby O recording studios with engineer, Mikey Davis, whose credits include W.A.S.P., Kiss, The Plimsouls, and more, to record their Screams in the Night album. Screams in the Night was released in the UK on Music For Nations Records, as well as on Roadrunner Records in Europe. Unable to land a record deal in America, Ann Boleyn began her own record company, New Renaissance Records. A video for the song "Bad Attitude", from Screams in the Night, gained Hellion substantial radio airplay in the United States as well as a video on MTV, VH1, and Sky Channel. With the exception of The Plasmatics, Hellion's video marked the first time a female-fronted metal band was featured on MTV.

In addition to performing music, Ann Boleyn is also a marathon runner, and ran and acted as a recognized "paceleader" for the Los Angeles Roadrunners in ten consecutive Los Angeles Marathons. Boleyn also was listed several times as a sanctioned runner in the Boston Marathon.

=== Mark II lineup and concept album ===
Although Screams in the Night gained substantial national and international radio airplay and television appearances, by the end of 1986, the new (Mark II) line-up began fighting about the band's musical direction. Members blamed Ann Boleyn's insistence on a European-style heavy metal direction, that included occult and antisocial themes in her lyrics, as the reason for their failure to secure a major-label recording deal. About this same time Niji Management fired Burn. A short time later, Burn disbanded, leaving Ray Schenck, Alan Barlam and Sean Kelley without a band. Anxious to get back to work, members of the band's original roster returned and entered The Record Plant in Los Angeles with their long-time friend Angelo Arcuri (who engineered the first three albums for Dio) and recorded the Postcards from the Asylum Mini-LP. At one point Hellion's remake of the Judas Priest track "Exciter", was listed on the play-lists of over 124 radio stations. Two months later, despite being over seven minutes long, "The Evil One" surpassed the earlier single, boasting listings on 128 U.S. stations.

In 1988, Hellion returned to London, where they played three shows at The Marquee. The band also performed a series of successful club shows in the UK before touring Europe.

While on the road supporting Postcards From The Asylum, Hellion decided to do a concept album. However, once Ann Boleyn began writing the lyrics she decided that a full-length novel should accompany the album. A lucrative publishing book deal followed as well as a new recording contract with Enigma Records, which had distribution through Capital. The Enigma deal was intended to gain the act distribution on a major label in America. Guitarist Tim Kelly, later of Slaughter, stood in for Ray Schenck.

Hellion entered The Music Grinder studios in Hollywood in about 1989 to begin recording The Black Book album. However, just one week after Hellion signed their record deal with Enigma Records, its president, Wess Hein, announced that he was forming a new record label called Hollywood Records.

Enigma Records went out of business before The Black Book was released, resulting in a delay in the album's release and in Hellion's contract being transferred to Medusa Records, a division of Restless Records, for the US release. Because Hellion was also signed to Music for Nations in England and Pony Canyon in Japan, the delay by the Restless Records caused the other label's release to also be delayed. Around this time guitarists Chet Thompson and Ray Shenck returned in time for Hellion's appearance at the Monster's of Rock in the U.S.S.R.

With the release of The Black Book delayed for over a year by Restless, the band grew restless themselves. It soon became evident that the new label was also in financial trouble. In late 1991, with the cancellation of MTV's Headbangers Ball, and the emergence of the Seattle Sound and new metal, Restless cancelled the editing of two videos as well as Ann Boleyn's appearance hosting Headbangers Ball. Restless eventually released The Black Book, but the packaging was of substantially lower quality than the gate-fold version that was sold in England and Japan. Due to the delay in the album's release, the book deal was also shelved.

=== First "Monsters of Rock" performance and hiatus ===
In 1990, Hellion performed at the first "Monsters of Rock" festival in the former USSR. The same year, Hellion also became the first American band to tour the former USSR, where they supported the Russian speed metal band Kruiz.

With the onset of the 1990s, Medusa Records closed its doors. Shortly after performing a show at The Troubadour with several new members, singer Ann Boleyn began experiencing threats from several stalkers and stopped performing for a number of years, after police were unable to quash the threat. During this period, Ann Boleyn obtained a degree in Germanic languages at UCLA and guitarist Chet Thompson embarked on a degree in psychology.

=== Later years ===
In 2001, Boleyn entered Talon Studio to record Will Not Go Quietly. Guitarists Ray Schenck and Chet Thompson are featured on that album. Due to legal problems facing the producer, Mikey Davis, after the recording was begun, Will Not Go Quietly was not completed for nearly a year and a half. The record was finally released in Germany in 2003, on Massacre Records.

In 2002, Ann Boleyn embarked on a solo tour of Japan. In conjunction with the tour, a limited edition fan club CD was released.

In 2003, Hellion's music business manager, James Paul Jr., entered a plea of guilty in the murder-for-hire case of his wife, Bonnie, according to a spokesman from the Los Angeles Police Department. James Paul Jr. was also charged with attempted breaking and entering of Ann Boleyn's home. In addition to safety concerns arising from the James Paul murder case, Ann Boleyn stopped performing after the police were unable to stop problems with a stalker. While on her hiatus from performing, Boleyn entered law school.

In July 2013, Hellion announced work has begun on a new EP with Ken Scott. The album is being recorded at Total Access Studios in Redondo Beach, California. The band now features a new line-up.

Guitarist Chet Thompson now owns a recording studio in Los Angeles, California. Bassist Alex Campbell went on to be instrumental in designing a pace-maker capable of restarting one's heart. According to the Ann Boleyn and Hellion pages on Facebook, Hellion will be entering a recording studio in July to record. In June 2013, Hellion also launched a new web page.

Former band member Ted Days died on July 10, 2013, at the age of 48.

== Discography ==
=== Albums ===
- Screams in the Night (1987)
- The Black Book (1990)
- Will Not Go Quietly (2003)

=== EPs ===
- Hellion (1983)
- Postcards from the Asylum (1988)
- The Witching Hour (1999)
- Into Cold Darkness (1999)
- Karma's a Bitch (2004)

=== Live ===
- Live and Well in Hell (1999)
- The Live "Uh Oh!" Album (1999)
- Cold Night in Hell (1999)

=== Singles ===
- "Driving Hard" / "Black Night" (1983, Mystic Records, catalog M45126)
- "Nightmares" split 7-inch EP with Bitch (1983, Mystic Records, catalog M745131) (also known as "Sound of Hollywood Girls")
- "Screams in the Night" (1987)

=== Others ===
- Up from the Depths (1998) (compilation featuring first two EPs plus additional tracks)
- Queen of Hell sampler (2000)
- Fan Club Special Release (2001)
