= Deadly Relics =

Compilation album by Artillery
- Released: 1998
- Recorded: 1983–1989
- Genre: Thrash metal
- Length: 58:59
- Label: Mighty Music

Artillery chronology
By Inheritance (1990)	Deadly Relics (1998)	B.A.C.K. (1999)

Deadly Relics is a compilation album by Danish thrash metal band Artillery. It was released in 1998, via Mighty Music. It contains various songs from four previous Artillery demos (except for 1982's We Are the Dead), and one new song.

== Track listing ==
1. "Artilleristic Prelude MCMXCVIII" - 00:53
2. "Khomaniac" - 06:42
3. "Don't Believe" - 04:31
4. "Out of the Sky" - 03:40
5. "Fear of Tomorrow" - 03:43
6. "Deeds of Darkness" - 06:56
7. "Too Late to Regret" - 03:59
8. "Deserter" - 05:36
9. "Hey Woman" - 03:51
10. "Time Has Come" - 06:08
11. "All for You" - 04:33
12. "Bitch" - 03:50
13. "Blessed Are the Strong" - 04:37

Track 1 is a new song recorded in 1998.
Tracks 2–3 are taken from the 1989 promo-tape.
Tracks 4–5 are taken from the Fear of Tomorrow demo.
Tracks 6–9 are taken from the Deeds of Darkness demo.
Tracks 10–13 are taken from the Shellshock demo.
