= Controlled Chaos =

Studio album by Nita Strauss
- Released: 16 November 2018
- Recorded: during 2018
- Studio: Sable Studios, Nocturnal Studios (Los Angeles)
- Genre: Rock
- Length: 38:14
- Label: Sumerian
- Producer: Nita Strauss

Nita Strauss chronology
Controlled Chaos (2018)	The Call of the Void (2023)

Professional ratings
Review scores
Source	Rating
Metal Injection	8/10

Controlled Chaos is the debut studio album by American rock guitarist Nita Strauss. Sumerian released the album on 16 November 2018.

== Background ==
Strauss explained: "From bright and fun to aggressive and dark, from peaceful to chaotic, this album is a way for me to give the listener a glimpse into my personality and what goes on inside my mind."

In April 2018, Strauss launched a Kickstarter campaign for her debut album. The campaign was successfully funded in two hours and eventually raised eight times its initial goal. Strauss produced the record herself, including the majority of the engineering work, and played all of the guitars and bass on the record.

After the record was completed, Strauss signed with Sumerian Records to release and distribute the album worldwide. The first single, "Our Most Desperate Hour", was released in September 2018 along with pre-orders for the record on both CD and vinyl, with the vinyl completely selling out before release. Controlled Chaos debuted on the Billboard charts at No. 1 Top New Artist, No. 3 Label Independent, No. 4 Top Hard Music, No. 8 Top Rock, No. 8 Top Internet, No. 20 Top albums, and No. 7 on the iTunes Rock chart. The album's second single, "Mariana Trench", was chosen by WWE as the official theme for NXT TakeOver: WarGames (2018).

== Reception ==
James Christopher Monger of AllMusic wrote: "Combining virtuosic tapping, ferocious shredding, and deep hooks, Controlled Chaos is the debut solo album from versatile American guitarist Nita Strauss, who first caught the metal scene's attention playing in the all-female Iron Maiden tribute band the Iron Maidens and the popular West Coast hard rock/glam metal outfit Femme Fatale."

A review by Metal Injection stated: "Track that album down, and you’ll discover a ton of great music performed by a selection of awesome guitar talents. Not female guitarists who happen to be “good for a girl”, but players who, like Strauss, leave no doubt in their wake... Still, this remains a great debut that—as its creator intended—leaves no doubt."

== Track listing ==
All tracks are written by Nita Strauss, except track 11.

No.	Title	Length
1.	"Prepare for War"	0:20
2.	"Alegria"	3:44
3.	"Our Most Desperate Hour"	4:04
4.	"Mariana Trench"	3:38
5.	"Here With You"	4:34
6.	"The Stillness at the End"	3:52
7.	"The Quest"	3:13
8.	"Hope Grows"	4:33
9.	"Lion Among Wolves"	2:47
10.	"Pandemonium 2.0"	3:14
11.	"The Show Must Go On" (featuring Tina Guo, cello)	4:15
Total length:		38:14

== Personnel ==
Band

- Nita Strauss – guitar, bass, producing, engineering
- Josh Villalta – drums, engineering
- Katt Scarlett – keyboards
- Tina Guo – cello (track 11)

Production

- Renee Robyn – artwork
- Brian Lucey – mastering
- Mike Plotnikoff – mixing
- Travis Huff – engineering

== Charts ==
Chart performance for Controlled Chaos
Chart (2018)	Peak position
UK Albums (OCC)	28
