= Legions (album) =

Studio album by Artillery
- Released: 26 November 2013
- Recorded: Medley Studio, April–July 2013
- Genre: Thrash metal
- Length: 55:19
- Label: Metal Blade Records
- Producer: Søren Andersen

Artillery chronology
My Blood (2011)	Legions (2013)	Penalty by Perception (2016)

Legions is the seventh studio album by Danish thrash metal band Artillery, released on 26 November 2013 on Metal Blade Records. It is the first Artillery album to feature vocalist Michael Bastholm Dahl and drummer Josua Madsen.

== Track listing ==
No.	Title	Length
1.	"Chill My Bones (Burn My Flesh)"	6:06
2.	"God Feather"	5:13
3.	"Legions"	4:37
4.	"Wardrum Heartbeat"	5:52
5.	"Global Flatline"	6:57
6.	"Dies Irae"	4:54
7.	"Anno Requiem"	4:14
8.	"Enslaved to the Nether"	5:28
9.	"Doctor Evil"	5:53
10.	"Ethos of Wrath"	6:05
Total length:		55:19

Japanese Version Bonus Tracks
No.	Title	Length
11.	"The Almighty"
12.	"Eternal War"
13.	"Bombfood" (Live 2013)
14.	"Khomaniac" (Live 2013)

== Personnel ==
- Michael Bastholm Dahl – vocals
- Michael Stützer – guitars
- Morten Stützer – guitars
- Peter Thorslund – bass
- Josua Madsen – drums
