= New Renaissance Records =

American record label

- Founded: 1984
- Founder: Ann Boleyn
- Distributors: Greenworld, Music for Nations
- Genre: Heavy metal
- Country of origin: U.S.
- Location: Burbank, California
- Official website: newrenaissancerecords.com

New Renaissance Records is an American record label founded in 1984 by Ann Boleyn, who also is the lead singer of the group Hellion.

== History ==
New Renaissance Records was created by Ann Boleyn after her band Hellion had a No. 6 record on the British Music Charts (as reported in Sounds and Kerrang!), but was unable to find an American deal. According to a March 1985 interview in Kerrang!, Boleyn sold her car and musical instruments to fund the initial pressings of compilation albums, which featured the earliest commercial recordings of Wehrmacht, Morbid Angel, Artillery, Mayhem, Prong, Sepultura, At War, Savage Grace, and Flotsam and Jetsam.

== Early history ==
By 1985, the demand for heavy metal products resulted in a packaging and distribution offer from Greenworld Distribution to both New Renaissance Records and Roadrunner Records. Therefore, some of the earliest pressings on New Renaissance bear the Greenworld label and feature a catalog number beginning with "GWD." However, by 1986 Greenworld Records Distribution became embroiled in legal problems after the distribution of the Frankenchrist album by the Dead Kennedys. In early 1986 Greenworld went out of business. After that time, the catalog numbers have all begun with "NR."

In 1987 Quorthon of Bathory from Stockholm, Sweden visited them for his first ever press campaign in USA.

Signed groups have included Chyld, Rock City Angels (featuring actor Johnny Depp), Wehrmacht, Sepultura, Morbid Angel, Artillery, King Kobra, IronChrist, and Kublai Khan. Other label acts include Wilder (Carmen Wilder), Holocross, Amulance, Blood Feast, Cerebus, Dream Death, Deadly Blessing, Forger featuring Geoff Mega, Genöcide, Medieval, Post Mortem, At War, Savage Grace, Mayhem, Prong, Whiplash, Indestroy, Screamer, and more.

== Current affairs ==
Label founder took time off of the music business to study law, and obtained her license to practice law in December 2007. The label maintains a catalog of over thirty titles which are distributed worldwide.

New Renaissance recording artist At War have returned with a new album Infidel in 2009 that has received critical acclaim and follows up their two New Renaissance titles Ordered to Kill and Retaliatory Strike.

In 2014, New Renaissance Records released a 2-disc anthology, entitled To Hellion And Back, by Hellion. The anthology was followed by Hellion's first release of new music in over a decade, and is entitled Karma's a Bitch.

== See also ==
- List of record labels
