= Artillery (band) =

Danish thrash metal band

- Artillery performing in 2026

Background information
- Origin: Taastrup, Denmark
- Genre: Thrash metal
- Years active: 1982–1991; 1998–2000; 2007–present
- Labels: Neat; Metal Mind; Roadrunner; Mighty; Die Hard; Metal Blade
- Members: Peter Thorslund; Michael Stützer; Martin Steene; Frederik Kjelstrup; René Loua
- Past members: Michael Bastholm Dahl; Kræn Meier; Per Onink; Carsten Lohmann; John Mathias; Mickey Find; Jørgen Sandau; Samir Belmaati; Anders Gyldenøhr; Per Moller Jensen; Henrik Quaade; Benny Balschmidt; Flemming Rönsdorf; Michael "Romchael" Nielsen; Mikael Ehlert; Carsten Nielsen; Søren Adamsen; Morten Stützer; Josua Madsen
- Website: www.artillery.dk/home.php

Artillery is a Danish thrash metal band. They participated in the early development of the genre, and were pioneers in the Danish thrash metal scene with their highly energetic, riff-centric and often fast-paced music. After releasing three full-length albums and touring extensively throughout the 1980s and early 1990s, Artillery disbanded in 1991, but reunited seven years later, only to disband once again in 2000. They reformed again in 2007 and are still together today.

== History ==
The band formed in June 1982 in Taastrup, a suburb of Copenhagen by drummer Carsten Nielsen and guitarist Jørgen Sandau. Artillery shared a rehearsal room with Mercyful Fate and Metallica for some time, whereby Artillery's sound also took some inspiration. The Stützer brothers had originally formed their band under the name Devil's Symphony in 1980. Later on, they named the band Artillery based on the track "Heavy Artillery" from Tank's album Filth Hounds of Hades. After trying several musicians, the line up became guitarists Jørgen Sandau and Michael Stützer, bassist Morten Stützer, drummer Carsten Nielsen and singer Carsten Lohmann. The group recorded the demos "We Are the Dead" in 1983, and "Shellshock" and "Deeds of Darkness" in 1984.

Artillery's first commercial debut came in early 1985 with the inclusion of the song "Hey Woman" on Volume One of the Speed Metal Hell compilation series which was released on New Renaissance Records. Later that year, Carsten Lohmann left and was replaced by Flemming Rönsdorf. Later the same year, Artillery recorded a fourth demo, "Fear of Tomorrow", signed with Neat Records, and released their first album, also titled Fear of Tomorrow. In 1986, Carsten Nielsen was contacted by Quorthon of Bathory asking him if he was interested in drumming for Bathory. Nielsen turned down the offer since he thought Artillery would become a much bigger band than Bathory. Their second album, Terror Squad, was released in 1987.

Guitarist Jørgen Sandau Putza left the band in 1989. Bassist Morten Stützer took over his position, lending the bass to recruit Peter Thorslund. That same year Artillery traveled to Tashkent, Uzbekistan (at the time still part of the USSR), where they performed at a local music festival. Their third album, By Inheritance, was released in 1990 on both LP and CD by Roadrunner Records and included a song called "7:00 from Tashkent". Artillery disbanded in 1991, with some of the members pursuing musical projects of their own during the rest of the 1990s.

Following the 1998 release of an Artillery compilation CD Deadly Relics by Mighty Music, featuring a mix of old demo recordings and two songs from the 1989 promotional tape, the band reformed to record a fourth album, B.A.C.K, which was released in 1999 by Die Hard Music. Then, in 2000, Artillery decided to split up again.

In 2007, the band released a limited edition 4-CD boxset entitled Through the Years, which contains the band's four studio albums and all their demo material.

On 6 November 2007, Michael Stützer confirmed on the official Artillery website that they were once again active. However, longtime Artillery singer Flemming Rönsdorf did not participate. On 27 November the same year, it was confirmed that singer Søren Adamsen would be the new frontman. This line-up recorded two albums, When Death Comes in 2009 and My Blood in 2011.

On 12 April 2012, drummer Carsten Nielsen announced that he was leaving the band after a US/South America tour in May that year. He was replaced by Josua Madsen. On 26 September the same year, it was also announced that Søren Adamsen had left the band and was replaced by Michael Bastholm Dahl. The new Artillery lineup was working on a new album entitled Legions, which they began recording in February 2013, and which was released on Metal Blade on 26 November 2013. On 7 October 2013, Metal Blade released the first video single from Legions in the form of the track "Chill My Bones (Burn My Flesh)". Legions was followed three years later by Penalty by Perception.

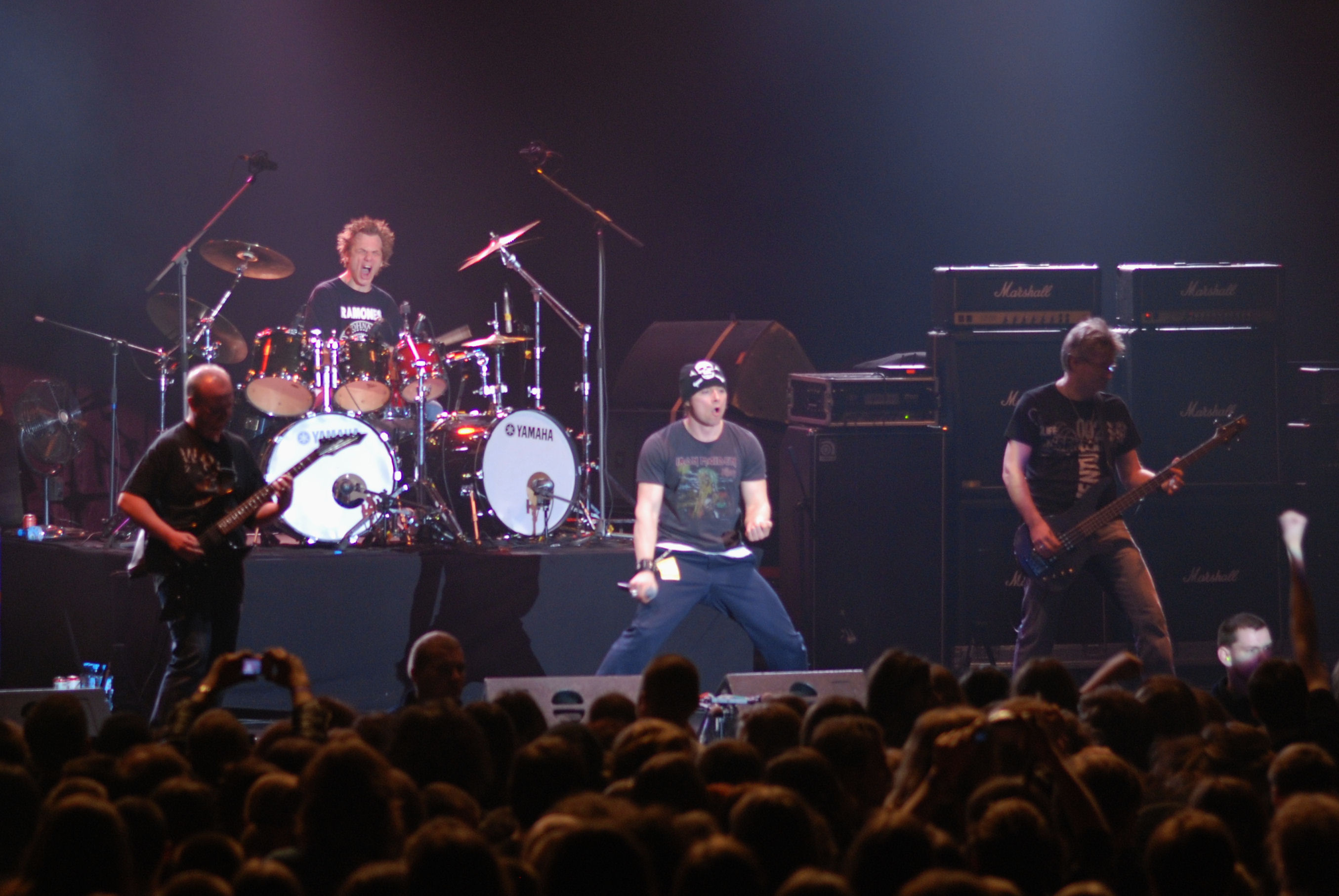
Artillery at Metalmania 2008

On 15 July 2018, Artillery announced on their Facebook page they were making a new album. This album, titled The Face of Fear, was released on 16 November 2018.

Guitarist and founding member Morten Stützer died suddenly on 2 October 2019; the surviving members of Artillery immediately announced that they would continue performing in his honor and he was replaced by Kræn Meier. The band released their first song in two years, "The Last Journey", digitally and on vinyl on 16 October 2020. The song serves as a tribute dedication to Morten Stützer and includes vocals from two of Artillery's former singers Flemming Rønsdorf and Søren Adamsen.

On 7 May 2021, Artillery released their tenth album, simply called X, produced in the Medley Studios in Copenhagen. The band toured worldwide in support of the album.

As of June 2022, Artillery has begun working on new music for their eleventh studio album.

On 8 March 2023, Artillery drummer Josua Madsen died after getting hit by a bus.

On 27 February 2026, Artillery released a new single called "Ghost In The Machine" four days prior to this release, the band announced an EP called "Made in Hell."

== Musical style ==
According to Eduardio Rivadavia of AllMusic: "Their riff-centric, knotty attack and clean vocals make for a trademark sound that is often at odds with the evolving production standards in the genre, but they've stuck to their guns."

== Band members ==
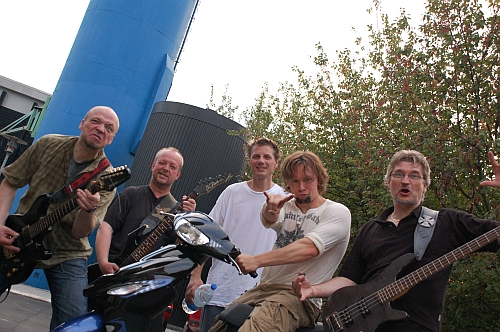
Artillery in 2010

Current

- Michael Stützer — lead guitar, backing vocals (1982–1987, 1988–1990, 1998–present)
- Peter Thorslund — bass, backing vocals (1988–1989, 1989–1992, 1998–2000, 2007–present)
- Frederik Kjelstrup Hansen — drums (2023–present)
- Martin Steene — lead vocals (2023–present)
- René Loua — rhythm guitar, backing vocals (2023–present)

== Discography ==
=== Studio albums ===
- Fear of Tomorrow (1985)
- Terror Squad (1987)
- By Inheritance (1990)
- B.A.C.K. (1999)
- When Death Comes (2009)
- My Blood (2011)
- Legions (2013)
- Penalty by Perception (2016)
- The Face of Fear (2018)
- X (2021)

=== Compilation albums ===
- Deadly Relics (1998)
- In the Trash (2019)

=== Box sets ===
- Through the Years (2007)

=== Live albums & DVDs ===
- One Foot in the Grave – The Other One in the Trash (2008)
- Raw Live (At Copenhell) (2024)
