= Fear of Tomorrow =

Studio album by Artillery
- Released: 1985
- Recorded: El Sound Studio, Copenhagen, Denmark, May–July 1985
- Genre: Thrash metal
- Length: 41:29
- Label: Neat Records
- Producer: Lars O. Christensen, Nils Bogvad and Artillery

Artillery chronology
Fear of Tomorrow (1985)	Terror Squad (1987)

Professional ratings
Review scores
Source	Rating
AllMusic	link
Terrorizer	(Nov 2008)

Fear of Tomorrow is the debut album by Danish thrash metal band Artillery. It was released in 1985 via Neat Records.

== Music ==
Fear of Tomorrow takes stylistic cues from both the new wave of British heavy metal and American thrash metal. According to Eduardio Rivadavia of AllMusic, Flemming Ronsdorf's "wailing falsetto was common enough for the era, but when combined with a lower, gravelly growl, somewhere between AC/DC's Bon Scott and Accept's Udo Dirkschneider, it would become Artillery's most recognizable asset."

== Critical reception ==
Eduardio Rivadavia of AllMusic gave the album three and a half stars out of five. He said: "Even though the quintet's somewhat inconsistent songwriting couldn't keep listeners riveted at all times, their instrumental abilities at such high speeds still sounded quite phenomenal for the mid-'80s, and the distinctively varied style of singer Flemming Ronsdorf provided a highlight in itself."

== Track listing ==
All tracks are written by Artillery.

No.	Title	Length
1.	"Time Has Come"	5:23
2.	"The Almighty"	4:17
3.	"Show Your Hate"	4:54
4.	"King, Thy Name Is Slayer"	3:42
5.	"Out of the Sky"	3:49
6.	"Into the Universe"	3:48
7.	"The Eternal War"	5:28
8.	"Fear of Tomorrow"	3:27
9.	"Deeds of Darkness"	6:41
Total length:		41:29

== Personnel ==
- Flemming Rönsdorf – vocals
- Michael Stützer – lead guitars
- Jørgen Sandau – rhythm guitars
- Morten Stützer – bass
- Carsten Nielsen – drums
