= My Blood (Artillery album) =

Studio album by Artillery
- Released: 2011
- Genre: Thrash metal
- Length: 53:32
- Label: Metal Mind Productions
- Producer: Søren Andersen

Artillery chronology
When Death Comes (2009)	My Blood (2011)	Legions (2013)

Professional ratings
Review scores
Source	Rating
AllMusic	4/5 stars

My Blood is the sixth studio album by Danish thrash metal band Artillery. It was released in 2011 via Metal Mind Productions. It is the last Artillery album recorded with drummer Carsten Nielsen, who announced his departure from the band in April 2012.

== Track listing ==
No.	Title	Length
1.	"Mi Sangre (The Blood Song)"	7:33
2.	"Monster"	4:57
3.	"Dark Days"	5:12
4.	"Death Is an Illusion"	5:16
5.	"Aint Giving In"	4:55
6.	"Prelude to Madness" (Instrumental)	1:06
7.	"Thrasher"	3:37
8.	"Warrior Blood"	5:10
9.	"Concealed in the Dark"	4:59
10.	"End of Eternity"	5:43
11.	"The Great"	5:04
Total length:		53:32

Bonus tracks
No.	Title	Length
12.	"Show Your Hate 2011" (re-recorded version)	5:03
13.	"Eternal War 2011" (re-recorded version)	5:21

Japanese Bonus tracks
No.	Title	Length
12.	"The Almighty 2011" (re-recorded version)	3:45

== Personnel ==
- Søren Adamsen – vocals
- Michael Stützer – guitars
- Morten Stützer – guitars
- Peter Thorslund – bass
- Carsten Nielsen – drums
