= By Inheritance =

Studio album by Artillery
- Released: May 29, 1990
- Recorded: January–February 1990
- Studio: Sweet Silence Studios, Copenhagen, Denmark
- Genre: Thrash metal
- Length: 47:38
- Label: Roadrunner
- Producer: Flemming Rasmussen

Artillery chronology
Terror Squad (1987)	By Inheritance (1990)	Deadly Relics (1998)

Professional ratings
Review scores
Source	Rating
AllMusic	4.5/5 stars

By Inheritance is the third studio album by Danish thrash metal band Artillery. It was released in 1990 via Roadrunner Records. It was Artillery's last album before they disbanded in 1991 and the release of their next album, B.A.C.K., in 1999. By Inheritance is considered by many thrash metal fans as a classic in the genre.

== Track listing ==
All tracks are written by Artillery

No.	Title	Length
1.	"7:00 from Tashkent"	0:54
2.	"Khomaniac"	6:42
3.	"Beneath the Clay (R.I.P.)"	4:49
4.	"By Inheritance"	5:43
5.	"Bombfood"	5:44
6.	"Don't Believe"	4:40
7.	"Life in Bondage"	5:26
8.	"Equal at First"	4:24
9.	"Razamanaz" (Nazareth cover)	3:14
10.	"Back in the Trash"	6:01
Total length:		47:38

== Personnel ==
- Flemming Rønsdorf - vocals
- Morten Stützer - guitar
- Michael Stützer - guitar
- Peter Thorslund - bass
- Carsten Nielsen - drums
