= B.A.C.K. =

Studio album by Artillery
- Released: October 2, 1999
- Genre: Thrash metal, speed metal
- Length: 50:07
- Label: Die Hard
- Producer: Bo Lund & Artillery

Artillery chronology
Deadly Relics (1998)	B.A.C.K. (1999)	Through the Years (2007)

B.A.C.K. is the fourth studio album by Danish thrash metal band Artillery. It was released in 1999 via Die Hard Music, and is the band's first full-length studio album since By Inheritance, which came out nine years earlier. After the release of B.A.C.K., Artillery would break up again, but eventually reformed for a second time in 2007.

== Track listing ==
All tracks are written by Artillery.

No.	Title	Length
1.	"Cybermind"	4:01
2.	"How Do You Feel"	4:01
3.	"Out of the Trash"	4:00
4.	"Final Show"	5:27
5.	"WWW"	3:54
6.	"Violent Breed"	3:48
7.	"Theatrical Exposure"	3:57
8.	"B.A.C.K."	3:48
9.	"The Cure"	3:18
10.	"Paparazzi"	4:07
11.	"Fly"	4:25
12.	"Jester"	5:18
Total length:		50:07

== Personnel ==
- Flemming Rönsdorf – vocals
- Morten Stützer – guitars and bass
- Michael Stützer – guitars
- Per Moller Jensen – drums

== Note ==
- The tracks "Fly" and "Jester" were originally bonus tracks for the Japanese version of the album. They are now also available on the version of B.A.C.K. found in the band's 4-CD box set, Through the Years, released in 2007, and in Germany on a 2010 re-release via Cyclone Temple.
