= Dawn Crosby =

American musician (1963–1996)

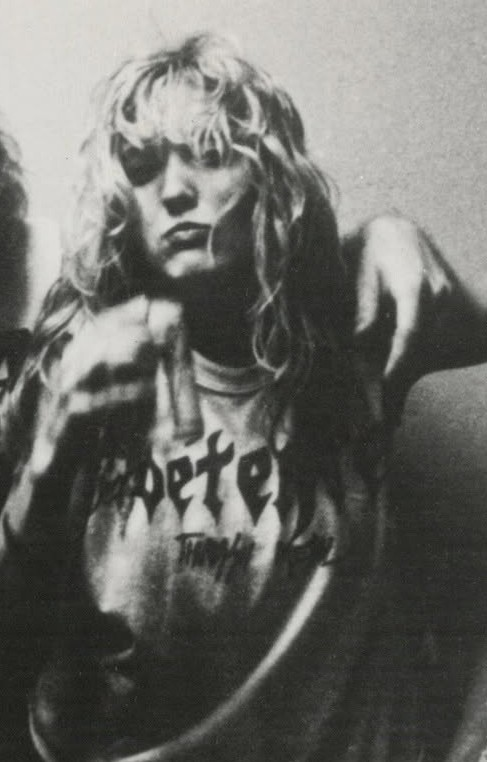
- Crosby in 1985

Background information
- Born: Lori Dawn Crosby Little; April 5, 1963; Oxon Hill, Maryland, U.S.
- Died: December 15, 1996 (aged 33) Annapolis, Maryland, U.S.
- Genre: Heavy metal
- Occupation: Singer
- Years active: 1984–1996
- Labels: Metal Blade; Roadrunner; Warner Bros.; Pavement
- Formerly of: Détente; Fear of God
- Website: fear-of-god.com

Lori Dawn Crosby Little (April 5, 1963 – December 15, 1996) was an American singer who was the lead vocalist of the thrash metal band Détente. After the band split, Crosby continued with the Détente brand, but due to a legal dispute, the name had to be dropped and Crosby, together with guitarist Michael Carlino, went on to form Fear of God, which was signed to Warner Bros. Records. The band's debut album, Within the Veil, was released in 1991.

They were slotted to become a major band in the metal music scene, even though the music was dark and dungeon-inspired, and a music video for the song "Betrayed" was released. Following the release of this album, Crosby and the band split, and she reformed the band with new members and released their second album, Toxic Voodoo in 1994, which demonstrated a heavier, thrash metal style.

Crosby died of liver failure from substance abuse on December 15, 1996, at the age of 33.
