= Terror Squad (Artillery album) =

Studio album by Artillery
- Released: 24 April 1987
- Genre: Thrash metal
- Length: 39:31
- Label: Neat Records

Artillery chronology
Fear of Tomorrow (1985)	Terror Squad (1987)	By Inheritance (1990)

Professional ratings
Review scores
Source	Rating
AllMusic	3/5 stars

Terror Squad is the second album by Danish thrash metal band Artillery. It was originally released in 1987 via Neat Records. Metal Hammer included the album cover on their list of "50 most hilariously ugly rock and metal album covers ever".

== Track listing ==
All tracks are written by Artillery

No.	Title	Length
1.	"The Challenge"	4:13
2.	"In the Trash"	4:47
3.	"Terror Squad"	5:47
4.	"Let There Be Sin"	3:53
5.	"Hunger and Greed"	5:04
6.	"Therapy"	4:03
7.	"At War with Science"	7:10
8.	"Decapitations of Deviants"	4:37
Total length:		39:31

== Personnel ==
- Flemming Rönsdorf: vocals
- Jørgen Sandau: rhythm guitar
- Michael Stützer: lead guitar
- Morten Stützer: bass
- Carsten Nielsen: drums

=== Production ===
- Arranged by Artillery
- Produced by Artillery and Lars Overgaard
- Recorded by Lars Overgaard, Lars Christensen and Nis Bögvad
- Mixed by Artillery and Lars Christensen
- All songs published by Neat Music Publishing
