= Raven discography =

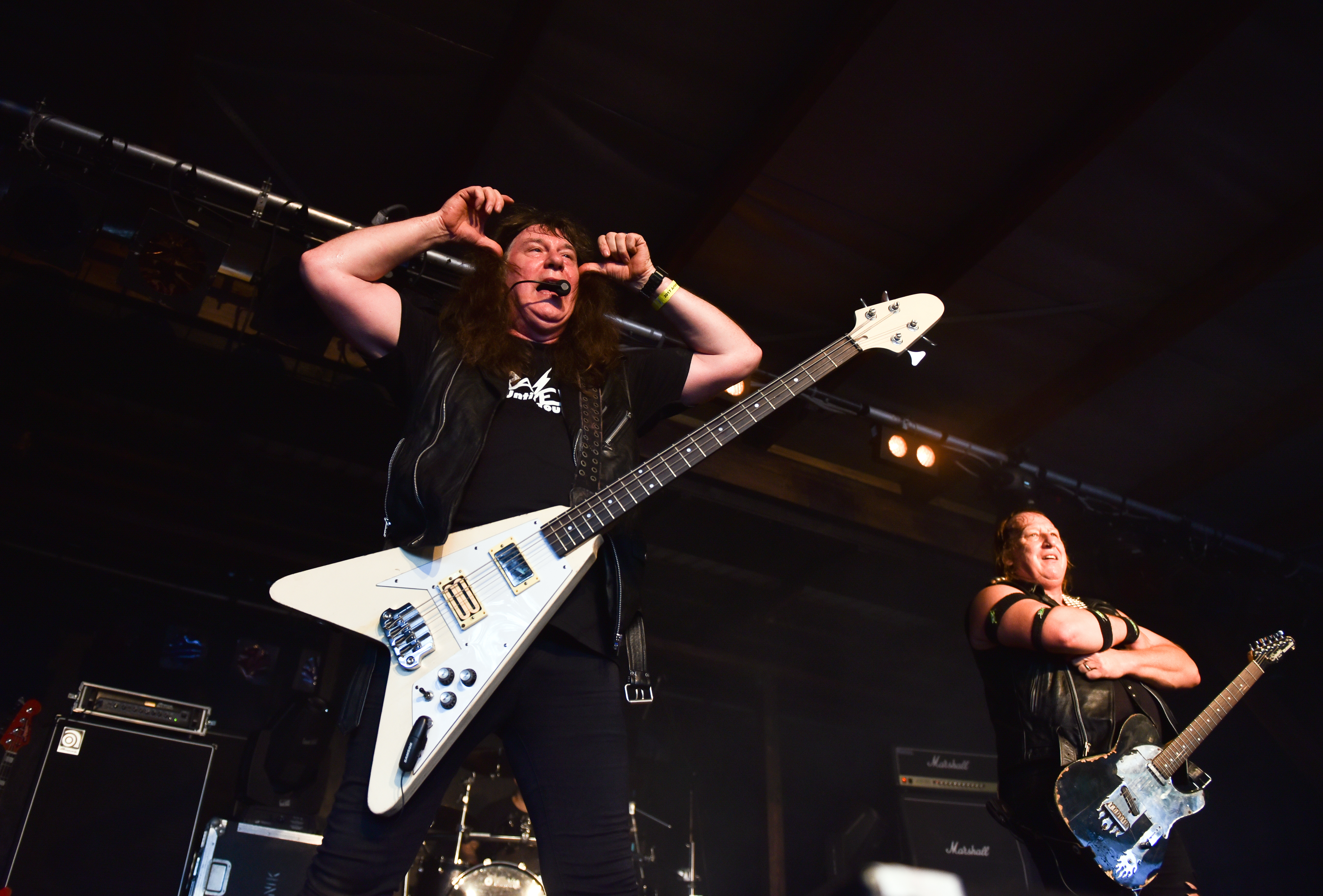
- Studio albums: 14
- EPs: 3
- Live albums: 2
- Compilation albums: 5
- Singles: 3

The discography of Raven, an English heavy metal band, consists of twelve studio albums, three EPs, three live albums, five compilation albums and three singles.

== Albums ==
=== Studio albums ===
List of studio albums, with selected chart positions, sales figures and certifications
Title	Album details	Peak chart positions	
Title	Album details	US	UK
Rock Until You Drop	Released: January 1981; Label: Neat; Formats: CD, LP	—	63
Wiped Out	Released: June 1982; Label: Neat; Formats: CD, LP	—	—
All for One	Released: August 1983; Label: Neat and Megaforce; Formats: CD, LP	—	—
Stay Hard	Released: February 1985; Label: Atlantic; Formats: CD, LP	81	—
The Pack Is Back	Released: March 1986; Label: Atlantic; Formats: CD, LP	121	—
Life's a Bitch	Released: 1987; Label: Atlantic; Formats: CD, LP	—	—
Nothing Exceeds Like Excess	Released: 1988; Label: Combat; Formats: CD, LP	—	—
Architect of Fear	Released: 1991; Label: SPV; Formats: CD, LP	—	—
Glow	Released: 1 March 1994; Label: SPV; Formats: CD, LP	—	—
Everything Louder	Released: 1997; Label: SPV; Formats: CD, LP	—	—
One for All	Released: 2000; Label: Metal Blade; Formats: CD, LP	—	—
Walk Through Fire	Released: 24 March 2009; Label: SPV, King; Formats: CD, LP	—	—
ExtermiNation	Released: 28 April 2015; Label: SPV; Formats: CD, LP	—	—
Metal City	Released: 18 September 2020; Label: Formats:	—	—
All Hell's Breaking Loose	Released: 30 June 2023; Label: Formats:	—	—
"—" denotes a recording that did not chart or was not released in that territory.

=== Extended plays ===
Title	Year
Crash Bang Wallop	1982
Mad	1986
Heads Up!	1991

=== Live albums ===
Title	Year
Live at the Inferno	1984
Destroy All Monsters/Live in Japan	1996
Screaming Murder Death from Above: Live in Aalborg	2019

=== Compilation albums ===
Title	Year
The Devils Carrion	1985
Unreleased Tracks	1990
Mind Over Metal	1993
Raw Tracks	1999
All Systems Go!: The Neat Anthology	2002
Leave ’em Bleeding	2022

== Singles ==
Title	Year
"Don't Need Your Money"	1980
"Break the Chain"	1983
"On and On"	1985
