= Total Metal: The Neat Anthology =

2004 compilation album by Atomkraft

Compilation album by Atomkraft
- Released: 26 August 2004
- Genre: Heavy metal; speed metal
- Length: 113:06
- Label: Castle Music; Sanctuary

Atomkraft chronology
Conductors of Noize (1987)	Total Metal: The Neat Anthology (2004)	Are You Looking at Me? (2005)

Total Metal: The Neat Anthology is a compilation album by British heavy metal band Atomkraft. It contains songs from albums published by Neat Records, as well as some previously unreleased material. It was released in 2004.

== Track listing ==
All tracks written by the band:

=== CD 1 ===
1. "Total Metal"
2. "Pour the Metal In"
3. "Foliage"
4. "Teutonic Pain"
5. "Funeral Pyre"
6. "Rich Bitch"
7. "Starchild"
8. "Warzone"
9. "Vision of Belshazzar"
10. "Burn in Hell"
11. "Requiem"
12. "Protector"
13. "Dead Man's Hand"
14. "Medley: This Planet Burning / Death Valley"

=== CD 2 ===
1. "Future Warriors"
2. "Queen of Death"
3. "The Cage"
4. "Demolition"
5. "Heat and Pain"
6. "Mode 3"
7. "Your Mentor"
8. "Trial by Deception"
9. "Demolition Boyz"
10. "Visions of Belshhazzar" (live)
11. "Foliage" (live)
12. "Annihilate the Bride"
13. "Dance of the Immortals"
14. "Total Metal" (1983 demo)
15. "Death Valley" (1983 demo)
