= UXB =

UXB may refer to:

- Unexploded bomb, an explosive weapon that did not explode when it was employed and still poses a risk of detonation
- Uxbridge tube station, England, London Underground station code
- Danger UXB, a 1979 British ITV television series about a squad of Royal Engineers with the duty of defusing unexploded ordnance
- "UXB", a song by Raven from their 1982 album Wiped Out
