= Hell Patrol =

Hell Patrol can refer to:

- A song by British heavy metal band Raven, from the 1981 album Rock Until You Drop
- A song by British heavy metal band Judas Priest, from the 1990 album Painkiller
