= Watch You Drown =

Watch You Drown may refer to:

- "Watch You Drown", a song by Raven from their 1994 album Glow (Raven album)
- "Watch You Drown", a song by Blanks 77 from their 1997 album Tanked and Pogoed
