= All for one =

All for One or All 4 One may refer to:

- One for all, and all for one (Unus pro omnibus, omnes pro uno), the motto of Dumas' Three Musketeers, and the traditional motto of Switzerland

== Film and television ==
- All for One (2011 film), a Danish film
- All for One (2024 film), a swashbuckler adventure film
- All for One (TV series), a 2010 Canadian reality series
- "All for One" (Battle for Dream Island), a 2026 web series episode
- "All for One" (The Bionic Woman), a 1978 TV episode
- "All for One" (Pocoyo), a 2006 TV episode
- "All for One" (The Sympathizer), a 2024 TV episode

== Music ==
- All-4-One, an American R&B group
- All for One Records, African-American record label commonly known as AFO

=== Albums ===
- All-4-One (All-4-One album), 1994
- All 4 One (beFour album) or the title song, 2007
- All for One (Raven album) or the title song, 1983
- All for One (The Screaming Jets album), 1991

=== Songs ===
- "All for One" (Brand Nubian song), 1990
- "All for One" (The Stone Roses song), 2016
- "All for One", by Blackmore's Night from Ghost of a Rose, 2003
- "All for One", by Diana Ross from The Boss, 1979
- "All for One", by James Brown from Reality, 1974
- "All for One", by Stryper from Against the Law, 1990
- "All for One", from the High School Musical 2 soundtrack, 2007
- "All 4 One", a song by Azad and Kool Savas

== Other uses ==
- Ratchet & Clank: All 4 One, a video game in the Ratchet and Clank franchise
- All For One (My Hero Academia), a Quirk (and metonymously named character) in the manga and anime series My Hero Academia

== See also ==
- One for all (disambiguation)
