= Jaguar (band) =

English heavy metal band

- Origin: Bristol, England
- Genres: Heavy metal, speed metal
- Years active: 1979–1985, 1998–present
- Labels: Neat, Roadrunner Records, Majestic, Angel Air Records
- Members: Garry Pepperd; Simon Patel; Nathan Cox; Tamás Csemez
- Past members: Jeff Cox; Chris Lovell; Rob Reiss; Paul Merrel; Gary Davies; Les Foster; Darren Furze; William Sealey; Jamie Manton
- Website: jaguarnwobhm.com

Jaguar are an English heavy metal band formed in Bristol in December 1979. They had moderate success throughout Europe and Asia in the early 1980s, during the heyday of the new wave of British heavy metal movement.

== History ==
=== Early years ===
The band was formed in December 1979 in Bristol through an advertisement published in a local newspaper by Jeff Cox and Garry Pepperd looking for a drummer. The original line-up consisted of Garry Pepperd (guitar), Jeff Cox (bass, vocals) and Chris Lovell (drums). The same year they went straight into Sound Conception Studios to record their first demo, which was finished on 22 March 1980. The songs recorded on their first demo were "Feel the Heat", "Battle Cry" and "Piledriver". In April 1980, they put out another advertisement for a vocalist, to which Rob Reiss answered joining the band. In December 1980, the band went into another studio, Studio 34, and recorded another demo, which they later put together with the previous demo tracks. The band added now three new demo tracks to the previous ones. The new tracks were "Stormchild", "Ain't no Fantasy" and "War Machine".

Now the completed work consisted of six songs on a demo track tape. The songs were "Stormchild" (Cox); "Ain't No Fantasy" (Pepperd); "War Machine" (Pepperd); "Battlecry" (Cox/Pepperd) "Feel The Heat" (Pepperd); and "Piledriver" (Cox/Pepperd). The demo was sold to the public through an ad in the music magazine Sounds, starting in February 1981. The band sold about 540 demos this way.

The Sounds ad put Jaguar in contact with the Dutch fan and promoter Frits Gijsbertse, who arranged multiple gigs for the band in the Netherlands. The local metal magazine Aardschok often featured Jaguar in its pages and the magazine's owner, a man named 'Metal Mike', became later the band's promoter in that country.

In 1980, Jaguar sent their demo also to a Battle of the Bands competition and eventually a letter came through saying: "Congratulations, you've made it through to the Bristol heats!" Their first performance at that contest was on 2 May 1981 and they arrived to the final. Jaguar got a good reaction from the judges and they came fourth. This result and their demo earned Jaguar the chance to contribute with the song "Stormchild" to the compilation album Heavy Metal Heroes, released by Heavy Metal Records. The same label released in the second week of November 1981 the single "Back Street Woman", which went sold out within two months of its initial pressing of 4,000 copies.

=== Signed with Neat Records ===
At the beginning of 1982, after an appearance at a Dutch rock festival with Raven, Jaguar were noticed by Raven's manager and also owner of the indie label Neat Records Dave Wood, who proposed to release the band's next single through his label. Jaguar signed the deal with Neat Records and replaced Reiss with Paul Merrell, former vocalist from the band Stormtrooper, just in time for the recording of the single "Axe Crazy", which was released later in 1982. After intensive touring, in June 1983 Jaguar released their debut album, Power Games, which was a success with its no-nonsense high-speed approach.

=== Signed with Roadrunner Records ===
Their follow-up album This Time was released in 1984 by Roadrunner Records and marked a change of musical direction for the band, towards a more melodic and AORish sound. At this time they were supported by Motörhead´s management, but by the end of the year Jaguar disbanded as Roadrunner did not fulfil the contract deal with the band.

=== Jaguar reformation ===
After a revival of interest in the new wave of British heavy metal in Europe and Japan, and the successful re-release of their first album in those regions, Jaguar reformed in 1999, with the modified line-up of Pepperd, Jeff Cox, Nathan Cox on drums and the new vocalist Jamie Manton. An appearance at Wacken Open Air Festival took place the same year. The album Wake Me followed in 2000, after which Jeff Cox left the band to concentrate on solo material and family life. He was replaced by Darren Furze.

The next album, Run Ragged, appeared in 2003. In 2007, the band released two live albums. The first release was a recording from a show the band performed in the Netherlands in 1982, which originally saw only a limited release. The second was the first of three planned releases covering early, unreleased recordings. Entitled Archive Alive Vol.1, it covered the period of the band's successful period, the birth of the band and their rise to NWOBHM prominence. Sleeve notes were written by the band's guitarist, Garry Pepperd, and the album cover included rare photographs.

=== Current activities ===
Jaguar released their latest album, Metal X, in 2014. It was their first new material since 2003's Run Ragged. Jaguar did their Swedish debut at the Sweden Rock Festival in the summer of 2014. In September 2014, Jaguar parted company with their previous vocalist Jamie Manton. In November the same year, the band released Metal X on GoldenCore Records/ZYX Music, mixed by Mike Exeter.

In August 2015, the band found L-G Persson, from the Swedish heavy metal/power metal band The Storyteller and ex Steel Attack from Gävle, Sweden, to replace Manton. Persson had left the band by November the same year.

Jeff Cox has recently formed a new progressive metal band called This Raging Silence, which released Isotopes and Endoscopes in 2015.

== Musical style and legacy ==
Jaguar played faster and more aggressively than any other band during the early days of the NWOBHM movement and, according to the band's history, they are considered among the inventors of the speed metal and thrash metal subgenres. They were influential for many other bands in later years, including US bands such as Metallica. Eduardo Rivadavia of AllMusic wrote: "Like many of their New Wave of British Heavy Metal peers, Jaguar flourished during the early stages of the movement thanks to their gritty, do-it-yourself philosophy. But when the style's initial momentum began to dwindle, leaving only a few enduring acts like Iron Maiden and Def Leppard still standing, Jaguar quickly faded into obscurity."

In an interview Garry Pepperd talked about Jaguar and their music style:

I suppose you could say we were thrash metal and speed metal before there was such a thing, (...) we were part of the second generation of the New Wave of British Heavy Metal I suppose, ourselves and Raven were playing music a bit faster than bands like Saxon and Tygers of Pan Tang. We were really playing something that is gonna be influential, although we never knew it at that time.

== Discography ==
=== Albums ===
- Power Games (1983) Neat Records
- This Time (1984) Roadrunner Records
- Wake Me (2000) Neat Metal Records
- Run Ragged (2003) Angel Air Records
- This Time Remaster (2009) Metal Mind Records
- Metal X (2014) GoldenCore Records/ZYX Music
- Metal X Limited Edition Vinyl LP (2015) GoldenCore Records/ZYX Music

=== Live albums ===
- Holland '82 (2006) Majestic Records

=== Compilations ===
- "Stormchild" on Heavy Metal Heroes (Heavy Metal Records, 1981)
- "Dirty Tricks" on 60 Min. Plus (Neat Records, 1982)
- The Anthology (2001) Sanctuary Records
- Power Games: The Anthology (2002) Sanctuary Records
- Archive Alive Volume I (2007) Majestic Rock
- Opening the Enclosure (2010) High Roller Records
- "Stormchild" (2014 Edition) on The Ultimate Oldschool Tracks
- Speed Metal (2014) GoldenCore Records/ZYX Music
- "Stormchild" on The Bristol Heavy Rock Explosion (Bristol Archive Records, 2016)

=== Singles ===
- "Back Street Woman" (1981) Heavy Metal Records
- "Axe Crazy" (1982) Neat Records

== Present band members ==
- Garry Pepperd – guitar
- Simon Patel – bass
- Nathan Cox – drums
- Tamás Csemez – vocals

== Past band members ==
- Jeff Cox – bass (1979–1985, 1998–2000), vocals (1979–1980)
- Chris Lovell – drums (1979–1984)
- Rob Reiss – vocals (1980–1982)
- Paul Merrell – vocals (1982–1985) See also: ex-Stormtrooper, ex-Hellrazer
- Gary Davies – drums (1984–1985)
- Les Foster – drums (1984) See also: ex-Tok-io Rose
- Darren Furze – bass (1998–2005)
- William Sealey – drums (2009–2011)
- Jamie Manton – vocals (1998–2014)

== See also ==
- List of bands from Bristol
- List of new wave of British heavy metal bands
