= Killer Elite =

Killer Elite may refer to:

== Films ==
- The Killer Elite (1975), with James Caan and Robert Duvall
- Killer Elite (film) (2011), with Robert De Niro, Jason Statham and Clive Owen

== Music ==
- Killer Elite (album) (1985), by British band Avenger
- Killer Elite: the Hits, the Highs, the Vids (2016), by British band DragonForce
