= One for all =

One for all may refer to:

- One for all, all for one (Unus pro omnibus, omnes pro uno), the motto of Dumas' Three Musketeers, and the traditional motto of Switzerland

== Film and television ==
- One for All (film) or The President's Mystery, a 1936 American film directed by Phil Rosen
- One 4 All (Une pour toutes), a 2000 French film directed by Claude Lelouch
- One for All (film) or Uno para todos, a 2020 Spanish drama film
- "One for All" (He-Man and the Masters of the Universe), a television episode
- One For All, a Quirk in the manga and anime series My Hero Academia

== Music ==
- One for All (band), an American jazz group formed in 1997
- One for All (Art Blakey album) or the title song, 1990
- One for All (Brand Nubian album), 1990
- One for All (Kazumi Watanabe album) or the title song, 1999
- One for All (Peter Criss album) or the title song, 2007
- One for All (Raven album), 2000
- "One for All", a song by Krokus from Rock the Block

== Other uses ==
- One for All, a brand name for some JP1 remote controls
- One for All (foaled 1966), American Thoroughbred racehorse, sired by Northern Dancer

== See also ==
- One for All – All for One, an album by Galneryus
- All for One (disambiguation)
