= Atomkraft =

British heavy metal band

Background information
- Also known as: Moral Fibre
- Origin: Newcastle upon Tyne, England
- Genres: Speed metal; NWOBHM; thrash metal
- Years active: 1978–present
- Labels: Neat, Sanctuary
- Members: Tony Dolan; Steve Mason; Payre Hulkoffgarden

Atomkraft are an English speed metal band from Newcastle, who were part of the new wave of British heavy metal movement. They formed in 1979, disbanded in 1988, and reformed in 2005. Atomkraft's "Total Metal" approach draws inspiration from fellow NWOBHM bands such as Motörhead and Venom, punk rock bands such as The Dickies, and early Exodus or Slayer. Lead vocalist/bassist Tony Dolan also fronted Venom for a number of years in the late 1980s and 90s.

== History ==
=== Moral Fibre ===
The roots of Atomkraft date to mid-1978, when Tony "Demolition" Dolan and Paul Spillett got together with the intention to form a band. Initially using the name of Moral Fibre and playing punk rock, they recruited guitarists Ian Legg and Chris Taylor. Ian Legg then left and was replaced by Sean Drew who also subsequently left. However, the band continued to operate as a trio.

=== Atomkraft ===
After returning from a trip to Bremen, Germany, Taylor presented his bandmates with some button badges featuring the environmental slogan 'Atomkraft, Nein Danke!' (Nuclear Power, No Thanks!) They liked the way the word "Atomkraft" sounded, so they adopted it as the band name, believing it suits the new "metal" sound they pursued. In pursuit of a heavier, more "metal" sound, the band decided to replace Taylor as guitarist. After trying out a couple of guitarists, they settled on Steve White, whom Dolan knew from his art class at college. Another member of Dolan's art class, Mark Irvine, joined on bass. With Dolan on rhythm guitar and vocals and Spillett on drums, the new line-up began to book shows. Irvine's parents disapproved of his heavy metal image and lifestyle, persuading him to quit the band. Dolan switched back to bass, and the band stayed together.

=== Demon ===
In 1981, the band recorded the four song demo Demon at Impulse Studios. Demon was funded by Spillett, who was the only member of Atomkraft working at the time, and was co-produced with Keith Nicol. It was their first "proper" demo, although, the limitation of time and a two-track recorder gave results that were far from ideal. However, the band soldiered on, gaining experience by continuing to play live shows.

=== Total Metal ===
In early 1983, Atomkraft returned to Impulse Studios to record another demo. Learning from their previous experience, they opted to record only two tracks for the Total Metal demo, featuring the title track, "Total Metal", and "Death Valley". White passed a copy of the demo to Sam Kress, who ran a radio station and Whiplash magazine. Kress was enthralled by the demo and promised to feature the band in his magazine. However, in late 1983, White left the band for personal reasons. Dolan was invited to live with his sister in Canada, and he moved to Canada.

=== Canada ===
In 1984, Spillett joined Dolan in Canada. The latter was further inspired when he got a copy of the magazine containing the write-up that Kress had promised. The write-up praised Atomkraft and also featured Venom, Raven, Metallica, Anthrax, and Megadeth. Spurred on by this, Spillett and Dolan began writing material and returned to England in late 1984 to search for a guitarist. However, Spillett and Dolan were driven apart by conflict over a girl.

=== Pour the Metal In ===
While visiting Neat Records to see if anyone could recommend a drummer, Dolan met Cronos of Venom who informed him that Ged Wolf (the brother of Venom's manager) was looking for a band having just left the heavy metal band Tysondog. Dolan and Wolf got together and started auditioning for a guitarist. Finally a then 16-year-old guitar player, Rob Mathew, was recommended and this became the new Atomkraft line-up. The band began working on the new material that Dolan had been writing, and went on to record the Pour the Metal In demo at Neat Records Studio. It featured three tracks, "Pour the Metal In", "Burn in Hell" and "Carousel". The demo was sent to various fanzines and received a good response. Dave Woods of Neat Records heard the demo and offered them a deal, and the band started work on the Future Warriors album.

=== Future Warriors ===
Recorded over a couple of weeks and produced by Keith Nichol, Future Warriors was released in September 1985. Despite getting a poor review in Kerrang! magazine, other reviews were more positive and they got further requests for interviews. The band also opened for Slayer at The Marquee, where faulty equipment resulted in the band trashing the equipment in frustration after just three numbers. Despite this the band were asked to join the bill of the Venom/Exodus tour.

=== Queen of Death ===
After the end of the Venom/Exodus tour, Atomkraft prepared and recorded a new EP, with the tracks "Your Mentor" on the A-side and "Demolition", "Funeral Pyre" and "Mode III" on the B-side. The EP did not get released in this form, as a rift developed in the band as a result of discussions over management. Dolan subsequently left the band. Neat then released the track "Your Mentor" as part of the Powertrax promotional cassette, while the vocal tracks on the rest of the "Your Mentor" sessions were re-recorded by Ian Davison-Swift from Avenger. D.C. Rage (Darren Cook of Avenger) was brought in as bassist and two new tracks were recorded, with the new four-piece, "Queen of Death" and "Protector" (although Alan Hunter of Tysondog had originally contributed vocals to "Protector"). In October 1986, the re-titled Queen of Death EP was released with the title track and "Protector" on the A-side, and "Demolition", "Funeral Pyre" and "Mode III" on the B-side. A re-recording of the track "Future Warriors", with Davison-Swift on vocals was also licensed for future inclusion in a compilation. With touring commitments lining up for the band, Dolan was invited to rejoin the band as rhythm guitarist, making Atomkraft a five-piece outfit for their upcoming shows.

=== Conductors of Noize ===
The new line-up recorded the mini-album Conductors of Noize, which was released in July 1987, and then promoted the record as part of support to Agent Steel and Nuclear Assault. The first date of the tour, at the Hammersmith Odeon featured an expanded line-up of Max Penalty, Atomkraft, Onslaught, Nuclear Assault and Agent Steel, and was promoted as 'The Longest Day'. Atomkraft's performance was filmed for the Live Conductors video as well as being recorded for a live BBC radio broadcast. They also played Dynamo Festival alongside Testament, Destruction and Stryper with the show going out live on Dutch radio.

=== Disbandment ===
The expanded five piece embarked on a 1988 European tour with Nasty Savage and Exumer ultimately resulting in a 'unique' gig (for the time) in Katowice, Poland, at Spodek Stadium. This show was recorded for live TV/video. On completion of the tour, the band folded in 1988.

=== Reformation ===
In 2004, Sanctuary Records (who had previously acquired the Neat Records back catalogue) released an Atomkraft anthology, Total Metal: The Neat Anthology. With renewed interest in the band, Dolan reformed Atomkraft for live dates in 2005 and a possible new album. The 2005 line-up included Payre Hulkoff (from Swedish industrial band Raubtier) on guitar and Steve Mason on drums. However, this line-up did not release any new material. An EP of new material came out in 2011 on the Austrian underground label, W.A.R. Productions. Named Cold Sweat it contained three unreleased tracks recorded with members of the 2005 line-up and session musicians, plus a cover version of the Thin Lizzy track, "Cold Sweat", featuring Australian guitar player Joe Matera on guitar solo. Following the release of Cold Sweat, Dolan recruited a new line-up and did one date in London under the Atomkraft moniker in 2011, performing tracks from the new EP. The 2011 line-up included Kraen Maier and Rich Davenport on guitars, plus Paul Caffrey (from Gama Bomb) on drums. This line-up of Atomkraft (minus Rich Davenport) performed the Future Warriors LP in its entirety in March 2014 at the second edition of Brofest, a NWOBHM festival based in Newcastle upon Tyne. Former Venom guitarist Jeff Mantas appeared as a guest during the gig.

A new compilation album, called Looking Back to the Future, was released in 2014 by Italian label Minotauro Records. It contained essentially unreleased demos and live tracks from every era of the band's history.

== Personnel ==
Current members

- Tony Dolan – bass, vocals (1979–1986, 1988, 2005–present; Venom, Mantas)
- Steve Mason – drums (2005–present; Iron Fire, Blinded by Fear)
- Payre Hulkoffgarden – guitars (2005–present; Viperine, Karyan, Raubtier)

Former members

- Sean Drew – guitar (1979–1983)
- Paul Spillet – drums (1979–1983)
- Ian Legg – guitar (1979)
- Chris Taylor – guitar (1979)
- Steve White – guitar (1980–1983; Venom, War Machine)
- Mark Irvine – bass (1981–1982)
- Neil Rander – guitar (1985)
- Rob Mathew – guitar (1985–1988; Agankast)
- Ged "Wolf" Cook – drums (1985–1988; Tysondog)
- Raggy – guitar (1986)
- IG – drums (1986)
- Ian Davison Swift – vocals (1986–1988; Satan, Avenger)
- Darren "D.C. Rage" Cooper – bass (1986–1988)
- Andra Butler – guitar (1987–1988; Revenant Host)
- Joe Matera – guitar (2006; Geisha)
- Cherisse Osei – drums (2011)

== Discography ==
=== Studio albums ===
- Future Warriors (1985)

=== EPs ===
- Queen of Death (1986)
- Conductors of Noize (1987)
- Cold Sweat (2011)

=== Compilation albums ===
- Total Metal: The Neat Anthology (2004)
- Looking Back to the Future (2014)

=== Demos ===
- Demon (1981)
- Total Metal (1983)
- Pour the Metal In (1985)

== See also ==
- List of new wave of British heavy metal bands
