= Roll with the Punches =

Roll with the Punches may refer to:

== Albums ==
- Roll with the Punches (Van Morrison album), or the title song, 2017
- Roll with the Punches (Bryan Adams album), or the title song, 2025

== Songs ==
- "Roll with the Punches", by Dawes from We're All Gonna Die, 2016
- "Roll with the Punches", by Lenka from Two, 2011
- "Roll with the Punches", by Patrice Rushen from Shout It Out, 1977
- "Roll with the Punches", by Randy Newman from Land of Dreams, 1988
- "Roll with the Punches", by Raven from One for All, 2000
- "Roll with the Punches", by Young MC from Stone Cold Rhymin', 1989
