= Armageddon USA =

American heavy metal band

- Also known as: Second Chance (1987–1988)
- Origin: Falls Church, Virginia
- Genres: Heavy metal, power metal, thrash metal, Christian metal
- Years active: 1987–2005, 2013–present
- Labels: Talkingtown, Retroactive, Regency (affiliated), Independent
- Members: Mike Vance; Robby Lee; Robert "PJ" Bussey; Dan Wilkinson; Joe Hasselvander
- Past members: Mark Miley; Scott St. James
- Website: Armageddon USA on Facebook

Armageddon USA, commonly known as Armageddon, is an American Christian heavy metal band that originated in Falls Church, Virginia.

== History ==
The band began in 1985, under the name Second Chance with vocalist Mike Vance and guitarist Robby Lee. In 1987, the two added the talents of bassist Danny Wilkinson and drummer Mark Miley. The next year, 1988, the band changed their name to Armageddon. Soon after the name change, Miley departed from the band. The band added Joe Hasselvander (Raven, Pentagram, Cathedral) to the drums and the band began recording their debut album, The Money Mask. The album featured various musicians, playing various instruments, including 12-string guitars and keyboards. The band kept performing until 2005, when they disbanded. In 2007, the band reissued the album through Retroactive Records. Around 2008, there was an article titled "Armageddon: Where Are They Now?" that was written by HM Magazine. In 2013, the band reunited with the same lineup, alongside guitarist Robert "PJ" Bussey. In 2015, the band released their sophomore album, Up in Flames, which was released independently. On October 7, 2017, the band announced that they were recording their third full-length album.

== Members ==
Current

- Michael "Mike" Vance – Vocals (1985–2005, 2013–present)
- "Robby Lee" – Guitars (1985–2005, 2013–present)
- Robert "PJ" Bussey – Guitars (1988–2005, 2013–present)
- Daniel "Danny" Wilkinson – Bass (1987–2005, 2013–present)
- Joe Hasselvander – Drums (1989–2005, 2013–present)

Former

- Mark Miley – Drums (1987–1989)
- Scott St. James – Drums (1989)

Session

- John Gallagher – Bass (2015–present)
- Phil Zeo – Guitars, 12-string (1989)
- Charlie Philips – Guitars, Backing Vocals (1989)
- Lamont Coward – Keyboards (1989)
- Paul Krueger – Backing Vocals (1989)
- Janusz Smulski – Keyboards (1989)

== Discography ==
=== As Second Chance ===
Demos

- Demo (1987)
- Second Chance (1987)
- The Blazing Wasteland (1988)

Compilation appearances

- East Coast Metal (1988; Regency)

=== As Armageddon ===
Studio albums

- The Money Mask (1989; Talkingtown)
- The Money Mask (2007; Retroactive, Reissue)
- Up In Flames (2015)

Compilation appearances

- Metal from the Dragon Vol. 1 (2017; The Bearded Dragon Productions)
