= Give Me a Break =

Give Me a Break or Gimme a Break may refer to:

== Television ==
- Gimme a Break!, a 1980s American sitcom
- Gimme a Break (game show), a 2009 British children's game show
- "Give Me a Break", a regular feature with John Stossel on the American television news magazine 20/20

== Music ==
- Give Me a Break, an album by The Ritchie Family, or the title song, 1980
- Gimme a Break, an EP by Resin Dogs, 2000
- "Gimme a Break", a song by Raven from Nothing Exceeds Like Excess, 1988

== Other uses ==
- Gimme a Break, a 1985 Bally Sente arcade video game
- "Gimme a Break", an advertising jingle for Kit Kat candy bars
