= Avenger (British band) =

English heavy metal band

- Origin: Newcastle, England
- Genres: Heavy metal
- Years active: 1982–1986, 2005–present
- Label: Neat Records
- Spinoff of: Blitzkrieg
- Members: Gary Young; Liam Thompson; Sean Jefferies; Ian Swift; Huw Holding
- Website: avenger-uk.com

Avenger are an English heavy metal band from Newcastle upon Tyne. Associated with the new wave of British heavy metal scene, they released two albums in the 1980s before splitting up. The band reunited in 2005.

== History ==
Brian Ross, Mick Moore and Gary Young founded Avenger late in 1982 after Ross and Moore's previous group, Blitzkrieg, split up. The group began recording demos. "Hot 'n' Heavy Express", was their first appearance on record, included on a Neat Records compilation EP. Their debut single for Neat, "Too Wild to Tame", followed in October 1983 after the addition of guitarist John Brownless.

Shortly after this, lead singer Brian Ross left the group to join Satan; Satan's singer, Ian Swift, promptly joined Avenger as lead vocalist. Adding guitarist Les Cheetham, they released their first LP, Blood Sports, in 1984. This began a period of the band playing regularly in western Europe, at the time a hub of the emerging metal scene.

A second album followed shortly after on Neat, entitled Killer Elite, along with a three track accompanying video. The group toured the United States in 1986, replacing Les Cheetam with Greg Reiter. Drumming duty of the US tour fell to Darren Kurland. After four months, returning to England, the group broke up, blaming poor record label support preventing the band exploiting their potential in the United States. Ian Swift joined Atomkraft with Gary Young later joining Blitzkrieg.

The group's entire discography was released in 2002 by Sanctuary Records. As well as Brazilian Label Frontline Rock rereleasing both albums in Latin America in 2003.

In February 2005, the core lineup of Young, Swift and Moore reunited and added north-east session musician, Liam Thompson (formerly guitar/vocals of Death in Blood) and guitarist Glenn Howes (formerly Blitzkrieg, Tygers of Pan Tang, Earthrod and Fist) and toured across the UK and Europe with US group Y&T, among others.

The Avenger line-up changed again in 2007 with the departure of original bassist Mick Moore. The new line-up of Avenger featuring Ian Swift on vocals, Gary Young, Liam Thompson, Sean Jefferies (former guitarist of Fallen Skies, Earthrod) and Huw Holding (former bassist of Order of the Black Sun, Nord, Cardinal Synne) and have since toured with or played alongside bands such as Twisted Sister, Candlemass, Saxon, Rage, Raven, Sinner, Grim Reaper, UFO, Cradle of Filth, Skyclad and Diamond Head in 2007.

Their most recent album, The Slaughter Never Stops, was released on 1 December 2014 to positive reviews.

On 5 December 2024, bassist Mick Moore died at the age of 65 from pneumonia, after being admitted to hospital for a number of health issues.

== Members ==
=== Current members ===
- Ian Swift – lead vocals (1984–1986, 2005–2009, 2013-present)
- Sean Jefferies – guitar (2006–2009, 2010–present)
- Liam Thompson – guitar, backing vocals (2005–present)
- Gary Young – drums, backing vocals (1982–1986, 2005–present)
- Mark Mabungway Kirby – bass (2022–present)

=== Former members ===
- Brian Ross – lead vocals (1982–1984)
- Andy Eden – lead vocals (2009–2011)
- Roddy B – lead vocals (2011–2013)
- Dean Thompson – guitar (2008–2011)
- Glenn S. Howes – guitar (2005)
- Les Cheetham – guitar (1984–1985)
- Mick Moore – bass (1982–1986, 2005, 2007) (died 2024)
- Ian 'Fuzz' Fulton – bass, backing vocals (2010–2015)
- Huw Holding – bass (2006–2009, 2015–2018)
- Daniel McEwan - bass (2018 - 2021)

== Discography ==
- One Take No Dubs... – Live in the studio (Neat Records compilation, 1982)
- "Too Wild to Tame" / "On the Rocks" 7" (Neat Records, 1983)
- Blood Sports (Neat Records, 1984)
- Killer Elite (Neat Records, 1985)
- Too Wild to Tame (Sanctuary Records compilation, 2002)
- The Slaughter Never Stops (Rocksector Records, 2014)

== See also ==
- List of new wave of British heavy metal bands
