= Saracen (band) =

English metal band

Saracen is a New wave of British heavy metal band from Derbyshire. They released two albums in their initial inception during the 1980s, and a further four albums after reforming in the 2000s.

They hail from Matlock. The band released their debut album in 1981, appeared on the Friday Rock Show and followed up with a single in 1982. Signing with Neat Records, Saracen did an album and a single there while going in a more album-oriented rock direction. The band reunited in 2001.

== Discography ==
- Heroes, Saints & Fools (1981)
- Change of Heart (1984)
- Red Sky (2003) – also released as a bundle with Heroes, Saints & Fools in 2006
- Vox in Excelso (2006)
- Marilyn (2011)
- Redemption (2014)
