= Joe Matera =

Australian guitarist

- Born: Kyabram, Australia
- Genres: Hard rock, rock, pop-rock, blues, instrumental
- Occupations: Musician, journalist, author
- Instrument: Guitar
- Labels: Mercury Fire Music (Australia), W.A.R. Productions (Europe), RVPrecords (Netherlands), Possum Records (Australia), Renaissance Records (USA)
- Website: joematera.com

Joe Matera is an Italian-Australian guitarist, rock journalist and author. In addition to a solo career, Matera is the guitarist in the Sweden-based rock band Rough Rockers, and was formerly the lead guitarist of Australian pop rock band Geisha between 2007 and 2010. Before joining Geisha, Matera was the lead guitarist of classic rock band Double Vision, from 2003 to 2008. He's currently working as a solo artist, releasing solo instrumental albums and contributing guitar on various recordings around the world. In 2022, he collaborated with the British band, The Korgis, on an album for the Japanese market.

Matera is also well known as a rock journalist, having published over 600 articles since 1999. As of 2022, he writes for magazines such as Guitar Player, Guitar World, Goldmine, Record Collector and others. Since July 2022, he has written a music column called, 'Musical Musings' for the Shepparton News.

He has interviewed bands and celebrities including Aerosmith, Metallica, Foo Fighters, Kiss, Queen, Iron Maiden, Bon Jovi and Black Sabbath. Matera's work has appeared in many magazines such as Classic Rock, Guitar & Bass, Metal Hammer and Total Guitar.

== Biography ==
Matera was born in Kyabram and took up the guitar at age 15, teaching himself how to play along the records of his parents collection and the sounds of the bands of his day. He joined his first band in the late 1980s, moving through a succession of bands in his local area. In 1994 he was asked to join the Shepparton Theatre Arts group production of Les Misérables. The success of the production saw Matera returning for the 1995 stage production of Chess.

In late 2000, he moved to Melbourne to further his music career, joining a number of original band as well as branching out in music journalism with his work appearing in magazines around the world ranging from Guitar World to Classic Rock. He formed and led his own band Double Vision between 2003 and 2008, and in 2007 joined a new line-up of Australian rock band Geisha, making his recording debut with the band on the single "Birthday" which was produced by the US producer Tom Werman. Matera also shared the live stages with the Australian acts as Taxiride and Dragon.

After releasing three further singles and an album with Geisha, Matera decided to quit the band to pursue a solo career in late 2010. His debut solo single, the instrumental "Travellin' West" appeared later that year. In 2011 he signed to European-based label W.A.R Productions, where he released the EP "Slave to the Fingers" which featured guest performances by Rick Brewster (The Angels), Mick McConnell (Smokie) and Tony Dolan (VENOM). In 2012 he released his debut album Creature of Habit, which received critical acclaim. The album was accompanied by Matera's first tour of Europe. The single "Fallen Angel" featured Matera's first lead vocal outing, with the single gaining airplay on European radio including BBC Radio. In 2013, the song was voted No. 154 (of 1000) on the Austrian station Life Radio's Hit Countdown for that year.

Aside from his solo career, Matera has contributed guitar to a number of international recordings such as Atomkraft, and their cover of Thin Lizzy's "Cold Sweat". Matera's original instrumental "Starry Night" was featured on the soundtrack of the Australian movie Ricky! The Movie.

In April 2012 Matera accompanied English singer-songwriter Steve Harley on his first promotional tour of Australia. The tour included various appearances on radio and TV, performing live acoustic sessions. This included the Melbourne radio station Gold FM 104.3, and Noise 11 TV. In 2013 he made an appearance playing on four tracks of the Austrian ambient metal band Uruk-Hai's album ...And All The Magic & Might He Brought.... In 2014 Matera released his second album Terra Firma and in May 2014 commenced on his second European tour.

Matera's third solo album, titled Louder Than Words, was released in July 2015. It was described by the German Gitarre & Bass magazine, as "Mainstream Rock with real old school grooves". The song "Feel Your Love" reached #15 on Radio Berlin's Hey Music Chart. To promote the album, Matera embarked on his third European tour during June–July 2015. In October 2015 Matera became the Dutch record label RVPrecords' first international signing. In December 2015, Matera received a Commended Entry Award in the 'Rock' category of the 2015 UK Songwriting Contest with "Feel Your Love". A new compilation Now and Then was released through the RVPrecords label in February 2016. In July–August, Matera embarked on his 4th European tour to support the new compilation album.

In June–July 2017, Matera was the support act for the Bay City Rollers at their two Melbourne shows. The EP, Heart of Stone, was released in September by RVPrecords, along with the title track as a single. Matera undertook his fifth European tour in October to promote the release. In 2018, Matera joined the Sweden-based rock band Rough Rockers. In April 2019, the Rough Rockers released the EP Smoke and Mirrors. Matera embarked on his sixth European tour in April–May 2019, While in Stockholm, he became the first Australian musician to record music at Sunlight Studio, where he worked with producer Tomas Skogsberg. Matera is also a regular guest on Nicole Chvastek's Statewide Drive show on 107.9 ABC Ballarat.

Matera released the single "Inside Looking Out" in October 2021, which features Don Powell of Slade fame on drums and Janne Borgh on bass. Matera's autobiography, Backstage Pass: The Grit and the Glamour, was released in October 2021 by the UK publisher Empire Publications. This was followed up by the publication of his second book, Louder Than Words: Beyond the Backstage Pass in April, 2024.

In December, 2022 Matera signed to iconic Australian record label Possum Records. The label released his latest album, 'The Lone Runner' in March, 2023. The album debuted on the Australian ARIA Jazz and Blues chart at number 4.

== Discography ==
=== Albums ===
List of albums, with selected chart positions and certifications
Title	Album details	Peak chart positions									
Title	Album details	CAN	AUS	AUT	GER	NLD	NOR	SWE	SWI	UK	US
Creature of Habit	Released: 2012; Format: CD, digital; Label: W.A.R. Productions (WAR074)	—	—	—	—	—	—	—	—	—	—
Terra Firma	Released: 2014; Format: CD, digital; Label: W.A.R. Productions (WAR080)	—	—	—	—	—	—	—	—	—	—
Louder Than Words	Released: 2015; Format: CD, digital; Label: W.A.R. Productions (WAR100)	—	—	—	—	—	—	—	—	—	—
Now and Then	Released: 2016; Format: CD, digital; Label: RVP Records (RVP16041); Note: Compilation	—	—	—	—	—	—	—	—	—	—
The Lone Runner	Released: March 2023; Format: CD, digital; Label: Possum Records (POSSUM1956)	—	4	—	—	—	—	—	—	—	—
"—" denotes items which were not released in that country or failed to chart.

=== Extended plays ===
List of EPs, with selected details
Title	Details
Slave to the Fingers	Released: November 2011; Format: CD, digital; Label: W.A.R. Productions (WAR068)
Heart of Stone	Released: 2017; Format: CD, digital; Label: RVP Records (RVP17066)
Eclectica	Released: 2021; Format: CD, digital; Label: Moloko+ (PLUS 125)

== Bibliography ==
- Backstage Pass: The Grit and the Glamour, 2021, Empire Publications, autobiography ISBN 1-90936-092-9
- Louder Than Words: Beyond the Backstage Pass, 2014, Mercury Fire Music, ISBN 979-8281568371
