= Hard Ride =

Hard Ride may refer to:

- The Hard Ride, a 1971 American biker film
- "Hard Ride", a song by Raven from their 1981 album Rock Until You Drop
- "Hard Ride", a song by Pantera from their 1988 album Power Metal
