= Live at the Inferno =

Live album by Raven
- Released: November 1984
- Recorded: 1984
- Genres: Heavy metal; speed metal
- Length: 82:31
- Labels: Neat (Europe); Megaforce (US)
- Producers: Raven, Jon Zazula, Marsha Zazula, Tony Incigeri

Raven chronology
| All for One (1983) | Live at the Inferno (1984) | Stay Hard (1985) |

Professional ratings
Review scores
| Source | Rating |
|---|---|
| AllMusic | 3/5 stars |
| Collector's Guide to Heavy Metal | 8/10 |

Live at the Inferno is a live album by the heavy metal band Raven. It was released in 1984 on Megaforce Records. The song "Live at the Inferno" first appeared on Raven's 1982 album Wiped Out. The album was intended to discourage the band's former label, Neat Records, from putting out a greatest hits compilation. It was the band's last release before signing with Atlantic Records.

According to John Gallagher the title of the bass solo, "I.G.A.R.B.O.," stands for "I've got a rampant boner on."

Coincidentally, an American 60s rock band also named Raven released a live album called Live at the Inferno in 1970.

== Track listing ==
All songs by Gallagher, Gallagher and Hunter.

Defcon 4

1. "Intro / Live at the Inferno" – 2:22
2. "Take Control" – 3:10
3. "Mind over Metal" – 3:35
4. "Crash Bang Wallop" – 3:13
5. "Rock until You Drop" – 4:26
6. "Faster than the Speed of Light" – 4:14

Defcon 3

7. "All for One" – 3:47
8. "Forbidden Planet" – 4:03
9. "Star War" – 5:27
10. "Tyrant of the Airways / Run Silent, Run Deep" – 6:50

Defcon 2

1. "Crazy World" – 4:50
2. "Let It Rip" – 4:08
3. "I.G.A.R.B.O." – 2:04
4. "Wiped Out" – 4:10
5. "Firepower" – 3:40

Defcon 1

6. "Don't Need Your Money" – 3:30
7. "Break the Chain" – 4:18
8. "Hell Patrol" – 7:19
9. "Live at the Inferno" – 7:25

== Personnel ==
=== Raven ===
- John Gallagher – basses, lead vocals
- Mark Gallagher – guitar
- Rob Hunter – drums, backing vocals

=== Production ===
- Alex Perialas, Peter Bombar – mobile engineers
- Norman Dunn – live sound engineer, studio engineer, mixing
- Jack Skinner – mastering at Sterling Sound, New York
- Jon Zazula, Marsha Zazula, Tony Incigeri – executive producers
