= Dedringer =

British hard rock band

- Also known as: Deadringer
- Origin: Leeds, England
- Genres: Hard rock
- Years active: 1977–1985
- Labels: Dindisc, Neat
- Past members: John Hoyle (vocals); Neil Hudson (guitar); Al Scott (guitar); Lee Flaxington (bass); Kenny Jones (drums); Mike Kremastoules (guitar)

Dedringer were an English hard rock band associated with the new wave of British heavy metal. They were formed in 1977 in Leeds, West Yorkshire, and released two albums (through Dindisc and Neat Records respectively) before finally quitting in 1985.

== History ==
Originally titled Deadringer, the band was formed in late 1977 as a cover band in Leeds by Johnny "JJ" Hoyle, Neil Hudson, Al Scott, Lee Flaxington and Kenny Jones. They built up a core grassroots following throughout 1978, and came to the attention of Virgin Records through their A&R man, who decided to manage the band when Virgin failed to sign them. In 1980, they signed to the pop and new romantic label Dindisc and issued their debut single, "Sunday Drivers", in January; the band toured the UK with the likes of Praying Mantis, Gillan, Triumph and the Michael Schenker Group.

February 1981 saw the release of Dedringer's debut album, Direct Line. Eduardo Rivadavia of Allmusic described the album as a "fairly innocuous hard set", and Martin Popoff, giving the album 6/10, summed it up as "a memorial to non-threatening pub rock, absorbing all the non-achieving affectations of those who slogged the wee stages before them." The album however sold enough to gain the band a set on the Friday Rock Show, but following the release of the Maxine EP in April 1981, strife between the band and their record label, and serious car accident suffered by Hudson and Scott, led the band to call it a day.

Hudson, Scott, and Jones reformed the band in 1982, with new members Neil Garfitt (vocals) and Chris Graham (bass guitar). They signed to Neat Records and released their new single, "Hot Lady" (in November 1982) and second LP, Second Arising (in January 1983). The new style was compared to new wave of British heavy metal bands Fist and Tygers of Pan Tang, as well as older acts such as AC/DC, Quiet Riot, Dokken, and Status Quo, but after some final line-up shuffling, diminishing fan interest led Dedringer to disband in 1985.

== Line-up ==
=== Last known line-up ===
- Neil Garfitt (vocals)
- Neil Hudson (guitar)
- Mike Kremastoules (guitar)
- Chris Graham (bass)
- Kenny Jones (drums)

=== Previous members ===
- Johnny "JJ" Hoyle (vocals) (Died May 7, 2009)
- Lee Flaxington (bass)
- Al Scott (guitar)

== Discography ==
- "Sunday Drivers" / "We Don't Mind" 7-inch (Dindisc, DIN-10, 1980)
- "Direct Line" / "She's Not Ready" 7-inch (Dindisc, DIN-12, 1981)
- Direct Line LP (Dindisc, DID-7, 1981)
- Maxine 2×7″ EP (Dindisc, DIN-11, 1981)
- "Hot Lady" 7-inch (Neat, NEAT-18, 1982)
- Second Arising LP (Neat, NEAT-1009, 1983)

== See also ==
- List of new wave of British heavy metal bands
