= Joe Hasselvander =

American drummer

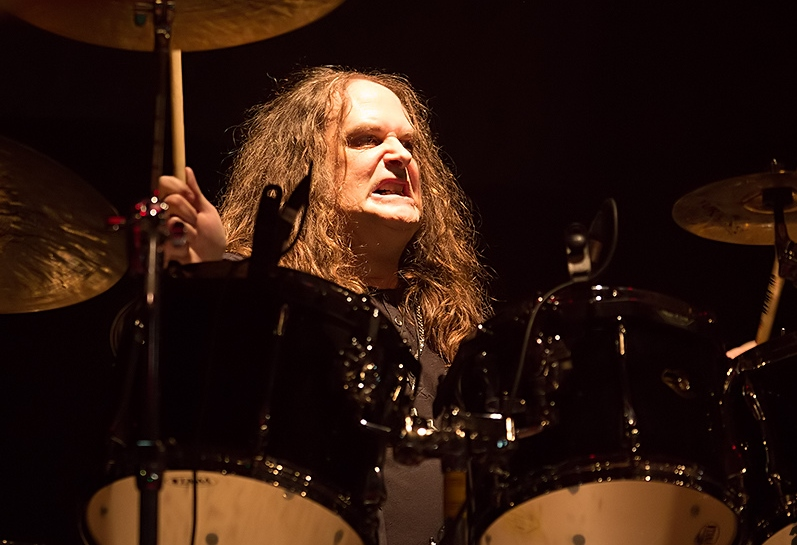
- Hasselvander performing with Raven in 2013

Background information
- Born: December 30, 1956 (age 68)
- Origin: Woodbridge, Virginia, U.S.
- Genres: Heavy metal, doom metal
- Occupation: Musician
- Instrument: Drums
- Years active: 1966–present
- Member of: The Hounds of Hasselvander, Death Row, Armageddon USA
- Formerly of: Raven, Pentagram, Jack Starr's Guardians of the Flame, Blue Cheer, Mountain, White Lion, Black Manta, Mind Assassin, Devil Childe, Phantom Lord

Joe Hasselvander (born December 30, 1956) is an American musician. He was the drummer of the British heavy metal band Raven from 1987 until 2017 and was a member of the influential American doom metal band Pentagram.

== Career ==
Hasselvander has been playing professionally since nine years old in 1966. He is self-taught, playing the violin and later the drums. He regularly played the military club circuit in and around the Washington, D.C. area until 1973, when he was asked to join The Platters after playing a show with them in Waldorf, Maryland. Hasselvander declined, saying he had to finish high school. He later joined a jazz fusion ensemble called the Ra Notra Sextet that was writing and performing music similar to Chick Corea or The Mahavishnu Orchestra.

=== Pentagram ===
In 1973, Hasselvander returned to the hard rock genre playing with the Washington, D.C. band The Boyz in the Washington/Baltimore area. In 1976, Hasselvander was asked to play in Mountain with Leslie West in a small club in Alexandria, Virginia. In 1977, he joined forces with Bobby Liebling and started a new and serious working version of heavy metal doom band, Pentagram. Hasselvander's first single, "Living in a Ram's Head" b/w "When the Screams Come", was recorded with Hasselvander sharing the producing duties with Liebling. In 1979, Pentagram opened for Judas Priest on the Hell Bent for Leather tour and later that year Hasselvander formed Overlord with members of Pentagram and Link Wray's The Pack.

In 1981, Hasselvander once again joined forces with The Boyz to release the album Bustin' Out, followed by a Falls Church, Virginia show with Ritchie Blackmore's Rainbow. Hasselvander formed Death Row with axeman Victor Griffin in 1982 and once again recruited Bobby Liebling and bassist Martin Swaney to write and record Pentagram's first LP on New York label Dutch East Records.

=== Solo career and Raven ===
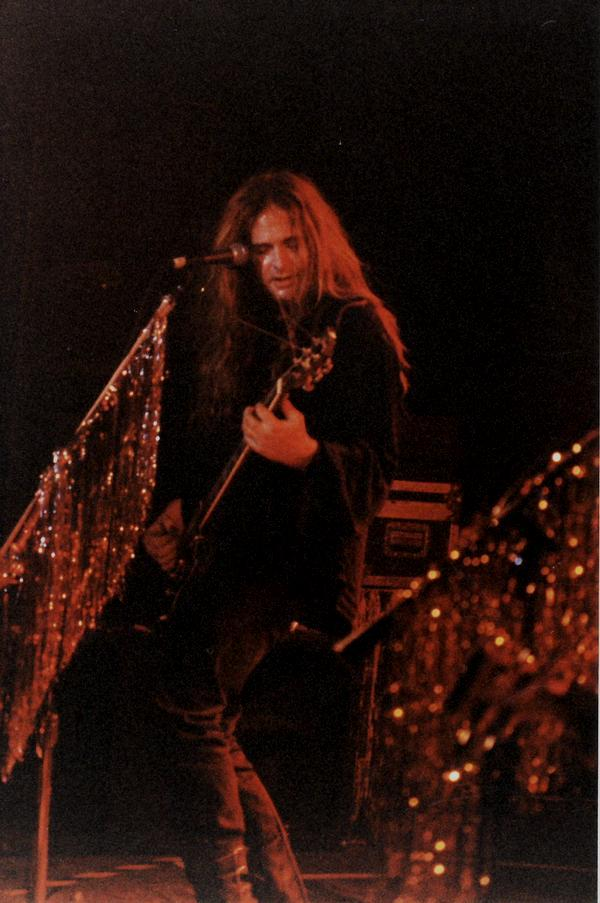
Hasselvander performing in 1997

Hasselvander moved to New York and recorded the albums Devil Childe and Phantom Lord with former Virgin Steele guitarist Jack Starr. He also recorded his first solo album, Lady-Killer. On Lady-Killer, Hasselvander performed rhythm guitar, bass, drums and vocals, while Jack Starr played the guitar solos. 1985 found Hasselvander working with British blues legend Kim Simmonds performing two years' worth of shows throughout the U.S. under the names Savoy Brown or The Kim Simmonds Band. Only one studio demo and one live recording exists of this lineup including players from Blue Cheer, Cactus, The Plasmatics and The Rods.

In September 1987, Hasselvander made a cameo appearance on Pentagram's second album, Day of Reckoning, filling in on the song "Burning Saviour". He soon after recorded all drum, guitar, bass and vocal tracks for his second solo album, Road Kill, issued on Bad Posture Records and subsequently recorded his first demos with new wave of British heavy metal legends Raven at Bearsville Studios near Woodstock, New York.

Hasselvander joined Raven in late 1987 and recorded the album Nothing Exceeds Like Excess for Combat Records. He followed up by touring with Raven supporting Testament in the United States and Kreator in Europe in 1989. Soon after, he recorded with Christian metal band Armageddon for their first album, The Money Mask. Raven switched labels and management to Drakkar Promotions and SPV/Steamhammer in Germany and recorded Architect of Fear, supporting the release by touring with Germany pirate rockers Running Wild. A video from this tour was made into an on-the-road "rock-umentary" entitled Electro Shock Therapy, which featured very revealing moments with Mr. Hasselvander in his natural habitat. The video was released in tandem with the EP Heads Up! featuring outtakes from Architect of Fear and live songs from the tour. A tour with German band Risk followed in 1992.

=== Pentagram reunion ===
In 1993, Hasselvander was asked to play on a reunion album for Pentagram called Be Forewarned for London-based Peaceville Records, after re-recording the drums for Day of Reckoning to be released on CD. Soon after, Hasselvander and Victor Griffin were asked to fill in on guitar and drums for British doom band Cathedral who were supporting Black Sabbath on a spring 1994 tour of Europe for their Cross Purposes album. Hasselvander returned to record Raven's 7th album, Glow, on the Japanese label Zero Corporation; the album was released in 1995. Hasselvander traveled to Los Angeles to take part in the Foundations Forum with Raven. Raven then went to Tokyo to record a live album, Destroy All Monsters/Live in Japan, and to record a Japanese MTV concert video. In 1996, Hasselvander recorded Everything Louder with Raven at Pete Evick's studio. The band flew to Europe once again to headline a tour for this album with support acts, Tank and HammerFall.

In 1997, Hasselvander and Bobby Liebling were signed to the Italian label Black Widow, and Review Your Choices was recorded with Hasselvander playing the drums, guitar and bass and Bobby doing vocals. In the summer of 1999, Raven traveled to Nashville, Tennessee to record One for All with producer Michael Wagener. A tour in January 2000 with U.D.O. followed in Germany and later that spring in the USA. Hasselvander re-signed with Black Widow to record the Pentagram album Sub-Basement, which was released to rave reviews in 2001.

Hasselvander played many one-off shows with Raven in 2003 with Mark Gallagher sporting a leg cast from an injury sustained in a near death work accident in 2002. In 2003, Hasselvander went to Florida with Jack Starr to record the album Under a Savage Sky under the banner of Jack Starr's Guardians of the Flame, featuring the vocals of Schmolik Avigal (ex-Picture, The Rods). Joe Hasselvander was the producer on this album.

In 2004, Hasselvander was asked to play two concerts in New Hampshire with his childhood idols, Blue Cheer. The shows went well and they got along famously. So much so that an album was recorded with Hasselvander on the drums, What Doesn't Kill You.... 2005 came and Hasselvander played the colossal German rock festivals Keep It True and Bang Your Head!!! with Raven, alongside the likes of Whitesnake and Foreigner. Bang Your Head!!! and Keep It True performances were filmed and released on DVD in 2006. Raven played more one off festivals during 2006 and 2007. One such gig was marred by an appearance of British rock vocalist Tony Mills, who rushed the stage and declared that he had a contract with the Gallaghers to become the next lead singer of Raven. Mills was beaten by the musicians on stage, much to the delight of a cheering crowd.

Hasselvander soon released his third solo album, The Hounds of Hasselvander, on German heavy metal label Rock Saviour Records, this time performing everything on the album. In November 2007, he went to England to play in the Hard Rock Hell festival at the Butlins resort in Minehead. The review by Geoff Barton simply states that "Raven took over the show from the likes of Twisted Sister, Saxon and UFO". This was all followed up by a few choice dates in the Netherlands and Belgium.

Hasselvander played out with a working version of his solo band, The Hounds of Hasselvander, on a tour of the East Coast of the US. He worked on a brand new line up for the Hounds of Hasselvander to tour Europe and Canada in the early spring of 2009. In 2008, Hasselvander concentrated on upcoming Raven shows in California with friends Hirax, in New York at the legendary club L'amour, and again back to England in September for a Raven mini-tour.

In June 2009, Hasselvander and Raven performed two nights in Japan in support of the band's new album Walk Through Fire (2009, King Records).

== Equipment ==
Ludwig double kit includes: 2 x 26″ kick drums, 8″ snare 10″, 12″, 14″, 16″, 18″ tom toms, assorted Zildjian cymbals, Remo heads, and Ahead drumsticks. For composition and other recordings, Hasselvander uses a Gibson SG guitar and a Gibson EB-3 bass.

== Album discography ==
=== Studio albums ===
Solo / The Hounds of Hasselvander

- Lady-Killer – Full-length, 1985
- Roadkill – Full-length, 2001
- The Hounds of Hasselvander – Full-length, 2007
- Lady-Killer/Roadkill – Full-length, Double CD Re-Release 2008
- The Ninth Hour – Full-length, 2011
- Midnight Howler – Full-length, 2015
- Ancient Rocks – Full-length covers album, 2016
- Another Dose Of Life – Full-length, 2021

With Raven

- Nothing Exceeds Like Excess – Full-length, 1988
- Unreleased Tracks – Full-length, 1990
- Architect of Fear – Full-length, 1991
- Glow – Full-length, 1994
- Everything Louder – Full-length, 1997
- Raw Tracks – Full-length, 1999
- One for All – Full-length, 2000
- Walk Through Fire Full Length, 2009
- ExtermiNation Full Length, 2015

With Pentagram

- Relentless – Full-length, 1985
- Day of Reckoning – Full-length, 1987
- Be Forewarned – Full-length, 1994
- Turn to Stone – Compilation, 1997
- Review Your Choices – Full-length, 1999
- Blue Explosion/Tribute to Blue Cheer – Full-length, 2000
- A Tribute to Captain Beyond, Thousand Days of Yesterdays – Full-length, 2000
- Death Is Alive – Full-length, 2000
- Sub-Basement – Full-length, 2001

Other

- The Boyz – Bustin' Out – EP, 1981
- Devil Childe – Devil Childe – Full-length, 1985
- Phantom Lord – Phantom Lord – Full-length, 1985
- Armageddon – The Money Mask – Full-length, 1989
- Black Manta – Fuck Them All but Six – Full-length, 2003
- Jack Starr's Guardians of the Flame – Under a Savage Sky – Full-length, 2003
- Cathedral – The Serpent's Gold – Compilation, 2004
- Blue Cheer – What Doesn't Kill You... – Full-length, 2007

=== EPs ===
Solo / The Hounds of Hasselvander

- Further Torments of The SG – 12-inch EP, 2009

With Raven

- Heads Up! – EP, 1991

With Pentagram

- Living in a Ram's Head b/w When the Screams Come – 7-inch, 1978

=== Live albums ===
With Raven

- Destroy All Monsters/Live in Japan – Live album, 1995

With Pentagram

- A Keg Full of Dynamite – Full-length, 2002
