= Stay Hard =

Studio album by Raven
- Released: 14 February 1985
- Recorded: 1984
- Studio: Pyramid Studios (Ithaca, New York)
- Genres: Heavy metal; glam metal
- Length: 35:56
- Label: Atlantic
- Producers: Raven, Michael Wagener, Tony Incigeri, Jon Zazula, Marsha Zazula

Raven chronology
Live at the Inferno (1984)	Stay Hard (1985)	The Pack Is Back (1986)

Singles from Stay Hard
- 1. "Pray for the Sun" Released: 1985; 2. "On and On" Released: 1985; 3. "Restless Child" Released: 1985

Professional ratings
Review scores
Source	Rating
AllMusic	1.5/5 stars
Collector's Guide to Heavy Metal	6/10

Stay Hard is the fourth studio album by English heavy metal band Raven, released in 1985. It was their first album recorded in the United States for the major label Atlantic Records, after the band had passed under American management. With this album, the band's more glam metal commercial sound was established.

"Hard Ride" is a re-recording of the song from Raven's debut album Rock Until You Drop.

== Track listing ==
All tracks are written by John Gallagher, Mark Gallagher, and Rob Hunter.

Side one
No.	Title	Length
1.	"Stay Hard"	2:59
2.	"When the Going Gets Tough"	3:34
3.	"On and On"	3:54
4.	"Get It Right"	4:49
5.	"Restless Child"	2:45

Side two
No.	Title	Length
6.	"Power and the Glory"	3:37
7.	"Pray for the Sun"	4:22
8.	"Hard Ride"	3:15
9.	"Extract the Action"	3:04
10.	"The Bottom Line"	3:37

CD reissue bonus tracks
No.	Title	Length
11.	"Gimme Just a Little"	3:56
12.	"Do or Die"	3:59

== Personnel ==
=== Raven ===
- John Gallagher – bass, vocals
- Mark Gallagher – guitars
- Rob Hunter – drums

=== Production ===
- Michael Wagener – production on tracks 3 and 8, mixing
- Norman Dunn – engineering
- Alex Perialas, Peter Bombar – assistant engineering
- George Marino – mastering at Sterling Sound, New York
- Jon Zazula, Marsha Zazula, Tony Incigeri – executive production
- Bob Defrin – art direction

== Charts ==
Album - Billboard (North America)

Year	Chart	Position
1985	Billboard 200	81
