= Blood Sports (album) =

Studio album by Avenger
- Released: 1984
- Studio: Impulse Studios, Wallsend, Tyne and Wear, England
- Genre: Heavy metal
- Length: 31:33
- Label: Neat
- Producer: Martin Smith

Avenger chronology
Blood Sports (1984)	Killer Elite (1985)

Professional ratings
Review scores
Source	Rating
AllMusic	1.5/5 stars
Collector's Guide to Heavy Metal	4/10
Hit Parader	3/5 stars

Blood Sports is a 1984 album released by the British heavy metal band Avenger. It was reissued in 2002 by Frontline Records.

== Track listing ==
Side one

1. "Enforcer" (Mick Moore, Ian Davison Swift) – 3:52
2. "You'll Never Take Me (Alive)" (Les Cheetam, Moore, Swift, Gary Young) – 3:22
3. "Matriarch" (Bob James, Ronnie Montrose, Jim Alcivar, Alan Fitzgerald, Denny Carmassi) – 3:51 (Montrose cover)
4. "Warfare" (Moore, Swift, Young) – 5:26

Side two

1. "On the Rocks" (Moore, Young, Brian Ross, Steve Bird) – 2:50
2. "Rough Ride" (Moore, Swift) – 3:28
3. "Victims of Force" (Moore, Swift) – 3:30
4. "Death Race 2000" (Moore, Young) – 3:06
5. "N.O.T.J." (Moore, Swift) – 5:32

== Personnel ==
Avenger

- Ian Davison Swift – lead vocals
- Les Cheetham – guitars
- Mick Moore – bass guitar
- Gary Young – drums

Production

- Martin Smith – producer, engineer
