= Walk Through Fire (Raven album) =

Studio album by Raven
- Released: 25 March 2009
- Genre: Heavy metal
- Length: 56:21
- Label: King Records; SPV/Steamhammer
- Producer: Raven

Raven chronology
One for All (1999)	Walk Through Fire (2009)	ExtermiNation (2015)

Walk Through Fire is the twelfth album by English heavy metal band Raven. It was released on 25 March 2009 for the Japanese label King Records.

== Track listing ==
1. "Intro" – 0:52
2. "Against the Grain" – 3:52
3. "Breaking You Down" – 3:02
4. "Under Your Radar" – 4:05
5. "Walk Through Fire" – 3:20
6. "Bulldozer" – 3:53
7. "Long Day's Journey" – 4:50
8. "Trainwreck" – 3:34
9. "Grip" – 3:32
10. "Running Around in Circles" – 3:40
11. "Hard Road" – 3:45
12. "Armageddon" – 6:31
13. "Attitude" – 3:24
14. "Necessary Evil" – 3:56
15. "Space Station #5" (Montrose cover) – 4:01

=== European edition bonus track ===
16. "The King" (live) – 4:53

== Personnel ==
- John Gallagher – bass, vocals
- Mark Gallagher – guitar
- Joe Hasselvander – drums
