= Destroy All Monsters/Live in Japan =

Live album by Raven
- Released: 18 April 1996
- Recorded: 13 May 1995
- Venue: Club Città, Tokyo, Japan
- Genre: Heavy metal; speed metal
- Length: 73:50
- Label: SPV
- Producer: Raven

Raven chronology
Glow (1994)	Destroy All Monsters/Live in Japan (1996)	Everything Louder (1997)

Professional ratings
Review scores
Source	Rating
Collector's Guide to Heavy Metal	6/10

Destroy All Monsters is the second live album from the band Raven. It was recorded at "Club Cittá" in Tokyo, Japan, in 1995 and released a year later.

== Track listing ==
1. "Victim" – 4:12
2. "Live at the Inferno" – 4:45
3. "Crash! Bang! Wallop" – 2:46
4. "True Believer" – 4:40
5. "Medley: Into the Jaws of Death / Hard as Nails / Die for Allah" – 9:35
6. "Guitar solo" – 2:16
7. "Medley: Speed of the Reflex / Run Silent, Run Deep / Mind over Metal" – 6:30
8. "Gimme a Reason" – 4:46
9. "Inquisitor" – 4:20
10. "For the Future" – 4:01
11. "Bass solo" – 1:24
12. "Architect of Fear" – 4:56
13. "White Hot Anger" – 4:45
14. "Drum solo" – 1:34
15. "Break the Chain" – 13:20

== Personnel ==
- John Gallagher – bass, vocals
- Mark Gallagher – guitar
- Joe Hasselvander – drums
