= Shepparton News =

Australian daily newspaper

- Type: Daily newspaper
- Owner: McPherson Media Group
- Editor: Tyler Maher
- Founded: 1877
- Language: English
- Headquarters: 7940 Goulburn Valley Hwy, Shepparton, Vic, 3630
- Sister newspapers: Country News; Kyabram Free Press; Tatura Guardian
- Website: www.sheppnews.com.au

Shepparton News is a daily morning newspaper serving Shepparton, Victoria. It was established in 1877 by Thomas Haslam as a weekly broadsheet and was purchased by Colin McPherson the following year. The News is owned by McPherson Media Group, a family business.

== History ==
=== Establishment and purchases (1877–1913) ===
In 1877, Thomas Haslam came to Shepparton with a printing press transported from Echuca by a bullock team and established the Shepparton News. As he was on the other side of the Goulburn River, it took two days for Haslam to transfer the plant on MacGuire's Punt two by two. The News was first published in February, and the original offices were at the corner of High and Westford Streets. The News' content was then largely of community meetings and around eighty percent advertising, and Haslam later sold it to Gordon Middleton.

In 1888, Congupna farmer Colin McPherson sold his stake in the Victorian Farmers Gazette and purchased the Shepparton News, as his poor health from asthma forced him to pursue another profession. The printing press was replaced by the Wharfedale cylinder press in 1892. There was a fire in 1893. As his health deteriorated, McPherson was forced to lease the News to employees Messrs. Morgan, Horan and Simpson in 1900. After his death in 1901, Edward John Morgan and his wife Jean McPherson operated the newspaper until his sons were old enough.

=== Inheritance and Robert Elliott (1913–1960) ===
After Morgan resigned in May 1913, the News was inherited by Malcolm and Stanley Roy McPherson. Malcolm joined the 4th Light Horse Regiment and was wounded at Gallipoli, dying in a Gibraltar hospital in January 1915. Roy operated the News alone until he was joined by his brother Francis Douglas McPherson in 1918. Douglas became a partner in 1925. While Roy developed a reputation as "a responsible publisher and progressive printer", senator Robert Elliott, who owned a newspaper chain, wanted to purchase both the News and the competing Shepparton Advertiser and merge them into one daily paper. When Roy refused, Elliott reportedly threatened to put them out-of-business within six months.

Elliott purchased twenty-five percent of Goulburn Valley Newspapers, the company which published the Advertiser. After Elliott lent the struggling Advertiser money, it became daily in May 1934 and offered national and cable news. The competition went on for twenty years until the board of the struggling Goulburn Valley Newspapers decided "to do all we can to enable the News to buy the Advertiser", which it did in 1953. The same year, the News moved into new offices. It also published the weekly Goulburn Valley Stock and Property Journal.

Donald "Don" Roy McPherson, the son of Roy McPherson, joined the newspaper in 1946. After a fire in 1951, the News operated in the cellar for several weeks and Don spent a few years organising for the construction of new premises. While it was three times the size of the first, the new building became too small after the purchase of the Advertiser and the new twin Cossar press. Don inherited the news after his father died in 1960.

=== Growth (1961–present) ===
During the 1960s, newspapers in Melbourne made large profits from television stations and looked to buy small rural papers. In response, Don McPherson bought seven papers from 1961 to 1966. The News' printing arm also moved in 1961 and the News moved to a neighboring building in 1963. However, printing costs had become high and McPherson Newspapers let David Syme, the publisher of The Age, buy a thirty-five percent stake. This grew to 46.7 percent as family members left the company. In July 1968, the News began printing on a 5-Unit Goss Community offset press and McPherson aimed to establish the first central printing plant in regional Australia. The newspapers he had purchased also contributed to growth. McPherson retired in 1985, and the News was inherited by his sons Ross and Chris.

The new owners bought four new newspapers, launched Country News and moved to Melbourne Road, Kialla in June 1988. The company was entirely under family control again in 1998. In October 2020, the News and other McPherson newspapers moved to a faster printing press in Wodonga, the first time Shepparton News has been printed outside Shepparton in over a century. The current owners of the McPherson Media Group are executive chairman and editor-in-chief Graeme Ross McPherson, managing director Christopher Roy McPherson and deputy chairman Robert Paul McPherson.

== Circulation, publication history and format ==
When it was first published in February 1877, the News was a four-page broadsheet published weekly on Thursdays and cost sixpence. It had a circulation of 500. The price was reduced to sixpence three years later. After purchasing and closing the Advertiser, the News became a tri-weekly (Monday, Wednesday and Friday) from Monday 29 June 1953. In 1972, the News became an afternoon daily. It became a morning daily shortly after moving to Kialla in 1988. The News currently has a combined print and digital monthly readership of 624,050 and is published on weekdays.
