= Life's a Bitch (album) =

Studio album by Raven
- Released: April 1987
- Recorded: November–December 1986
- Studio: Bearsville Studios (Bearsville, New York)
- Genre: Heavy metal; speed metal
- Length: 51:56
- Label: Atlantic
- Producer: Raven & Chris Isca

Raven chronology
Mad (1986)	Life's a Bitch (1987)	Nothing Exceeds Like Excess (1988)

Professional ratings
Review scores
Source	Rating
AllMusic	3/5 stars
Collector's Guide to Heavy Metal	6/10

Life's a Bitch is the sixth full-length album by the English heavy metal band Raven, released in 1987. It was the last album to feature original drummer/founding member Rob Hunter.

== Track listing ==
All tracks are written by John Gallagher, Mark Gallagher, and Rob "Wacko" Hunter.

Side one
No.	Title	Length
1.	"The Savage and the Hungry"	3:47
2.	"Pick Your Window"	3:29
3.	"Life's a Bitch"	3:47
4.	"Never Forgive"	4:38
5.	"Iron League"	3:21
6.	"On the Wings of an Eagle"	6:35

Side two
No.	Title	Length
7.	"Overload"	4:18
8.	"You're a Liar"	2:39
9.	"Fuel to the Fire"	3:43
10.	"Only the Strong Survive"	3:45
11.	"Juggernaut"	5:08
12.	"Playing with the Razor"	3:21

CD reissue bonus tracks
No.	Title	Length
13.	"Trigger"	3:34
14.	"Speed of the Reflex"	5:01

== Personnel ==
=== Raven ===
- John Gallagher – bass, vocals
- Mark Gallagher – guitar
- Rob Hunter – drums

=== Production ===
- Chris Icsa – producer, engineer, mixing with Raven
- Tom Chadley – assistant engineer
- Dennis King – mastering at Atlantic Studios, New York
- Bob Defrin – art direction
