= Architect of Fear =

Eighth album by the British band Raven

Studio album by Raven
- Released: 1991
- Recorded: August–September 1990
- Studio: Tonstudio Mohrmann, Witten, Germany
- Genre: Heavy metal; speed metal
- Length: 54:33
- Label: SPV
- Producer: Raven

Raven chronology
Nothing Exceeds Like Excess (1988)	Architect of Fear (1991)	Glow (1994)

Professional ratings
Review scores
Source	Rating
Collector's Guide to Heavy Metal	5/10

Architect of Fear is the eighth full-length album by the English heavy metal band Raven, released in 1991.

== Track listing ==
All music by Raven, lyrics by John Gallagher.

1. "Architect of Fear Intro" – 1:21
2. "Architect of Fear" – 4:01
3. "Disciple" – 4:03
4. "Got the Devil" – 4:39
5. "Part of the Machine" – 3:59
6. "Under the Skin" – 5:27
7. "White Hot Anger" – 5:31
8. "Can't Run and Hide" – 2:48
9. "Blind Leading the Blind" – 5:03
10. "Relentless" – 3:49
11. "Just Let Me Go" – 6:08
12. "Heart Attack" – 3:52
13. "Sold Down the River" – 3:52

== Personnel ==
=== Band members ===
- John Gallagher – bass, vocals
- Mark Gallagher – guitar
- Joe Hasselvander – drums

=== Production ===
- Detlef Mohrmann, Heimi Milkus – engineer, mixing
- Peter Scott – synthesizers programming
