= The Pack Is Back =

Studio album by Raven
- Released: 10 March 1986
- Recorded: October 1985 – January 1986
- Studios: Bearsville Studios, Bearsville, New York
- Genre: Glam metal
- Length: 36:55
- Label: Atlantic
- Producer: Eddie Kramer

Raven chronology
Stay Hard (1985)	The Pack Is Back (1986)	Mad (1986)

Singles from The Pack Is Back
- 1. "Gimme Some Lovin'" Released: 1986; 2. "The Pack Is Back" Released: 1986

Professional ratings
Review scores
Source	Rating
AllMusic	2/5 stars
Collector's Guide to Heavy Metal	5/10
Metal Forces	75/100

The Pack Is Back is the fifth full-length album by the English heavy metal band Raven, released in 1986 (see 1986 in music). It was recorded in the US with producer Eddie Kramer and features a sound more FM-friendly and commercial than any other Raven album, retaining the glam metal vein from its predecessor Stay Hard. Despite the pressure of the label to produce a commercially successful album, The Pack Is Back did not have any relevant chart entry.

Metal Hammer included the album cover on their list of "50 most hilariously ugly rock and metal album covers ever".

== Track listing ==
All tracks are written by John Gallagher, Mark Gallagher, and Rob Hunter, except where stated.

Side one
No.	Title	Writer(s)	Length
1.	"The Pack Is Back"		3:43
2.	"Gimme Some Lovin'" (Spencer Davis Group cover)	Spencer Davis, Steve Winwood, Muff Winwood	3:14
3.	"Screamin' Down the House"		4:00
4.	"Young Blood"		3:24
5.	"Hyperactive"		3:41

Side two
No.	Title	Length
6.	"Rock Dogs"	4:00
7.	"Don't Let It Die"	3:47
8.	"Get into Your Car and Drive"	3:54
9.	"All I Want"	3:34
10.	"Nightmare Ride"	3:38

CD reissue bonus tracks
No.	Title	Length
11.	"How Did You Get So Crazy"	3:49
12.	"Seen It on the T.V."	4:06

== Personnel ==
=== Band members ===
- John Gallagher – bass, vocals
- Mark Gallagher – guitar, guitar synthesizers, synthesizers, vocals
- Rob Hunter – drums

=== Additional musicians ===
- The Uptown Horns – brass on tracks 5 and 7

=== Production ===
- Eddie Kramer – producer, engineer, mixing, piano
- Chris Isca – engineer
- Larry Swisp – mixing
- Bob Ludwig – mastering
- Bob Defrin – art direction

== Charts ==
Album – Billboard (North America)

Year	Chart	Position
1986	The Billboard 200	121
