= ExtermiNation =

Studio album by Raven
- Released: 28 April 2015
- Genre: Heavy metal
- Length: 62:09
- Label: SPV/Steamhammer
- Producer: Raven

Raven chronology
Walk Through Fire (2009)	ExtermiNation (2015)	Metal City (2020)

Extermination (stylized ExtermiNation) is the thirteenth studio album by British heavy metal band Raven. It was released on 28 April 2015 by Steamhammer.

== Reception ==
Jesse Striewski of New Noise remarked in his review of the album, "There are some brief moments of hope, however; 'It’s Not What You Got' has potential, but isn’t strong enough to carry the whole album."

== Track listing ==
No.	Title	Length
1.	"Intro/Destroy All Monsters"	6:04
2.	"Tomorrow"	4:24
3.	"It's Not What You Got"	3:26
4.	"Fight"	4:00
5.	"Battle March/Tank Treads (The Blood Runs Red)"	5:23
6.	"Feeding the Monster"	3:40
7.	"Fire Burns Within"	4:55
8.	"Scream"	3:01
9.	"One More Day"	5:10
10.	"Thunder Down Under"	4:46
11.	"No Surrender"	3:50
12.	"Golden Dawn"	0:53
13.	"Silver Bullet"	4:12
14.	"River of No Return"	5:22
15.	"Malice in Geordieland"	3:03
Total length:		67:05

== Personnel ==
- John Gallagher – bass, vocals
- Mark Gallagher – guitar
- Joe Hasselvander – drums
