= Killer Elite (album) =

Studio album by Avenger
- Released: 1985
- Recorded: Impulse Studios, Wallsend, Tyne and Wear, England
- Genre: Heavy metal
- Length: 37:56
- Label: Neat
- Producer: Keith Nichol

Avenger chronology
Blood Sports (1984)	Killer Elite (1985)

Alternative cover

Professional ratings
Review scores
Source	Rating
AllMusic	2.5/5 stars
Collector's Guide to Heavy Metal	4/10
Kerrang!	3.5/5 stars

Killer Elite is a 1985 album released by the British heavy metal band Avenger. It was released by Neat Records.

== Track listing ==
All lyrics are written by Ian Swift, except where indicated.

Side one
No.	Title	Music	Length
1.	"Revenge Attack"	Mick Moore, Gary Young, Swift	4:11
2.	"Run for Your Life"	Greg Reiter, Swift	2:59
3.	"Brand of Torture"	Reiter, Swift	2:14
4.	"Steel on Steel"	Reiter, Swift	4:44
5.	"(Fight for the) Right to Rock"	Moore, Swift	4:11

Side two
No.	Title	Lyrics	Music	Length
6.	"Hard Times"		Reiter, Swift	1:59
7.	"Under the Hammer"		Moore, Swift	2:33
8.	"Face to the Ground"	Swift, Young	Moore, Swift, Young	2:47
9.	"Dangerous Games"		Reiter, Swift	1:49
10.	"Yesterday's Heroes"		Reiter, Swift	4:40
11.	"M.M. 85"		Reiter, Moore, Swift, Young	2:10
12.	"Sawmill"		Reiter, Swift	3:39

== Personnel ==
Avenger

- Ian Davison Swift – lead vocals
- Greg Reiter – guitars
- Mick Moore – bass guitar
- Gary Young – drums

Production

- Keith Nichol – producer, engineer
