= Everything Louder =

Studio album by Raven
- Released: 1997
- Genre: Heavy metal
- Length: 55:05
- Label: Fresh Fruit/SPV
- Producer: Raven

Raven chronology
Destroy All Monsters/Live in Japan (1996)	Everything Louder (1997)	One for All (1999)

Professional ratings
Review scores
Source	Rating
Collector's Guide to Heavy Metal	6/10

Everything Louder is the tenth studio album by the English heavy metal band Raven, released in 1997.

== Track listing ==
No.	Title	Length
1.	"Blind Eye"	3:50
2.	"No Pain, No Gain"	3:33
3.	"Sweet Jane"	5:01
4.	"Holy Grail"	3:51
5.	"Hungry"	5:01
6.	"Insane"	4:52
7.	"Everything Louder"	5:56
8.	"???"	0:29
9.	"Between the Wheels"	3:43
10.	"Losing My Mind"	3:07
11.	"Get Your Fingers Out"	3:40
12.	"Wilderness of Broken Glass"	6:06
13.	"!!!"	0:13
14.	"Fingers Do the Walking"	4:06
15.	"Bonus"	1:37
Total length:		55:05

== Personnel ==
- John Gallagher – bass, vocals
- Mark Gallagher – guitar
- Joe Hasselvander – drums
