= Mad (Raven EP) =

EP by Raven
- Released: July 1986
- Recorded: House of Music Studios, New Jersey, 1986
- Genre: Heavy metal; speed metal
- Length: 20:45
- Label: Atlantic
- Producer: Raven

Raven chronology
| The Pack Is Back (1986) | Mad (1986) | Life's a Bitch (1987) |

Professional ratings
Review scores
| Source | Rating |
|---|---|
| AllMusic | 2.5/5 stars |
| Collector's Guide to Heavy Metal | 4/10 |
| Kerrang! | 2/5 stars |

Mad is an EP released by English heavy metal band Raven in 1986, after the debacle of the album The Pack Is Back, which received largely negative reviews and insignificant commercial success. The songs of this EP mark the return to a more aggressive and metallic sound. It has never been re-released on CD. Its tracks were released as bonus tracks on other CD releases.

== Track listing ==
All tracks are written by John Gallagher, Mark Gallagher, and Rob "Wacko" Hunter.

Side One
| No. | Title | Length |
|---|---|---|
| 1. | "Speed of the Reflex" | 5:01 |
| 2. | "Do or Die" | 3:57 |

Side Two
| No. | Title | Length |
|---|---|---|
| 3. | "How Did Ya Get So Crazy" | 3:45 |
| 4. | "Seen It on the T.V." | 4:06 |
| 5. | "Gimmie Just a Little" | 3:56 |

== Credits ==
=== Raven ===
- John Gallagher – bass, vocals
- Mark Gallagher – guitar
- Rob Hunter – drums

=== Production ===
- Nelson Ayres, Paul Higgins – engineers, mixing
- Dennis King – mastering
