= Nothing Exceeds Like Excess =

Studio album by Raven
- Released: June 10, 1988
- Recorded: 1988
- Studio: UCA Recording Studio, Utica, New York
- Genre: Heavy metal; speed metal
- Length: 49:12
- Label: Combat
- Producer: Raven

Raven chronology
Life's a Bitch (1987)	Nothing Exceeds Like Excess (1988)	Architect of Fear (1991)

Professional ratings
Review scores
Source	Rating
AllMusic	3/5 stars
Collector's Guide to Heavy Metal	5/10

Nothing Exceeds Like Excess is the seventh full-length album by the band Raven, released in 1988. It is Raven's first album with drummer, Joe Hasselvander who replaced original drummer/founding member Rob Hunter.

== Track listing ==
All tracks are written by John Gallagher and Mark Gallagher, except tracks 1, 4, 6, and 11 by Raven.

Side one
No.	Title	Length
1.	"Behemoth"	1:05
2.	"Die for Allah"	4:58
3.	"Gimme a Break"	3:19
4.	"Into the Jaws of Death"	6:08
5.	"In the Name of Our Lord"	3:46
6.	"Stick It"	3:10

Side two
No.	Title	Length
7.	"Lay Down the Law"	4:45
8.	"You Gotta Screw Loose"	4:22
9.	"Thunderlord"	4:30
10.	"The King"	4:25
11.	"Hard as Nails"	5:06
12.	"Kick Your Ass"	3:18

1999 reissue bonus track
No.	Title	Length
13.	"Lay Down the Law" (live)	4:45

== Personnel ==
=== Raven ===
- John Gallagher – basses, lead vocals, engineer
- Mark Gallagher – guitar, backing vocals, engineer
- Joe Hasselvander – drums, backing vocals

=== Production ===
- Bob Yeager – engineer
- Bob Ludwig – mastering at Masterdisk, New York
