= Glow (Raven album) =

Studio album by Raven
- Released: 1 March 1994
- Recorded: Showplace Studios, Dover, New Jersey, USA, 1994
- Genre: Heavy metal
- Length: 48:31
- Label: SPV
- Producer: Raven

Raven chronology
Architect of Fear (1991)	Glow (1994)	Destroy All Monsters/Live in Japan (1996)

Professional ratings
Review scores
Source	Rating
Collector's Guide to Heavy Metal	6/10

Glow is the ninth full-length album by the band Raven, released in 1994 (see 1994 in music).

"The Rocker" is a Thin Lizzy cover.

== Track listing ==
All songs by Gallagher, Gallagher, Hasselvander unless noted.

1. "Watch You Drown" – 4:36
2. "Spite" – 2:26
3. "True Believer" – 4:42
4. "So Close" – 4:14
5. "Alter" – 4:33
6. "The Dark Side" – 3:52
7. "The Rocker" (Phil Lynott, Brian Downey, Eric Bell) – 3:07
8. "Turn on You" – 3:43
9. "Far and Wide" – 5:21
10. "Victim" – 3:51
11. "Gimme a Reason" – 4:02
12. "Slip Away" – 4:04

== Personnel ==
- John Gallagher – bass, vocals
- Mark Gallagher – guitar
- Joe Hasselvander – drums
