= All for One (Raven album) =

Studio album by Raven
- Released: 1983
- Studio: Pineapple (London)
- Genres: Heavy metal; speed metal
- Length: 40:52
- Label: Neat
- Producers: Michael Wagener, Udo Dirkschneider, Raven

Raven chronology
Wiped Out (1982)	All for One (1983)	Live at the Inferno (1984)

Singles from All for One
- 1. "Break the Chain" / "The Ballad of Marshall Stack" Released: May 1983; 2. "Born to Be Wild" / "Inquisitor" Released: August 1983

Professional ratings
Review scores
Source	Rating
AllMusic	4.5/5 stars
Collector's Guide to Heavy Metal	10/10

All for One is the third studio album by English heavy metal band Raven. Released in 1983 by Neat Records, this would be their last album outside of a major label. It is also notable that Udo Dirkschneider, frontman of German band Accept would appear on a couple of the tracks recorded.

Tracks 11–13, which were added to the CD re-issue, were taken from "Break the Chain", Raven's single released around the same time. They feature Udo Dirkschneider performing vocal parts with John Gallagher.

== Track listing ==
All tracks are written by John Gallagher, Mark Gallagher, and Rob Hunter, except where stated.

Side one
No.	Title	Length
1.	"Take Control"	3:21
2.	"Mind over Metal"	3:28
3.	"Sledgehammer Rock"	3:58
4.	"All for One"	3:31
5.	"Run Silent, Run Deep"	5:37

Side two
No.	Title	Length
6.	"Hung, Drawn and Quartered"	5:17
7.	"Break the Chain"	3:47
8.	"Take It Away"	3:23
9.	"Seek and Destroy"	3:50
10.	"Athletic Rock"	4:40

CD reissue bonus tracks
No.	Title	Writer(s)	Length
11.	"Born to Be Wild" (Steppenwolf cover, featuring Udo Dirkschneider)	Mars Bonfire	3:29
12.	"Inquisitor" (ft. Udo Dirkschneider)		4:01
13.	"The Ballad of Marshall Stack"		5:38

== Personnel ==
Raven

- John Gallagher – basses, lead and backing vocals
- Mark Gallagher – guitar
- Rob Hunter – drums, backing vocals

Production

- Michael Wagener – producer, engineer, backing vocals
- Udo Dirkschneider – producer, backing vocals
