= One for All (Raven album) =

One For All

Studio album by Raven
- Released: 1999
- Recorded: WireWorld (Nashville, Tennessee)
- Genre: Heavy metal
- Length: 55:17
- Labels: Pony Canyon (Japan); Massacre (Europe); Metal Blade (US)
- Producer: Michael Wagener

Raven chronology
Everything Louder (1997)	One For All (1999)	Walk Through Fire (2009)

Professional ratings
Review scores
Source	Rating
Collector's Guide to Heavy Metal	6/10
Kerrang!	1/5 stars

One For All is the eleventh studio album by the English heavy metal band Raven. It was released in 1999 in Europe, Japan, and South America and on May 23, 2000 in the U.S.A.

== Track listing ==
No.	Title	Length
1.	"Seven Shades"	4:13
2.	"Double Talk"	3:29
3.	"Roll With The Punches"	5:21
4.	"Get Your Motor Running"	3:36
5.	"To Be Broken"	4:52
6.	"Derailed"	3:44
7.	"Hunger Inside"	4:47
8.	"Top Of The World"	3:47
9.	"In The Line Of Fire"	4:11
10.	"Kangaroo"	3:04
11.	"New Religion"	4:38
12.	"Last Ride"	4:35
Total length:		50:17

== Personnel ==
- John Gallagher – bass, vocals
- Mark Gallagher – guitar
- Joe Hasselvander – drums
