= Neat Records =

British independent record label

- Parent company: BMG Rights Management
- Founded: 1979
- Founder: David Wood
- Status: Inactive. Sold to Sanctuary Records in 1995
- Genre: Heavy metal, speed metal, black metal, AOR, punk rock
- Country of origin: United Kingdom
- Location: Wallsend, Tyne and Wear, England

Neat Records was a British independent record label based near Newcastle, England. The label was established in 1979 by David Wood, who was the owner of Impulse Studios in Wallsend, Tyne and Wear. A key figure in the establishment of the label was Steve Thompson. Thompson was house producer at Impulse at the time and helped set up Neat, became the A&R manager and produced all the initial recordings, as well as managing the publishing arm, Neat Music. The label was sold in 1995 to Sanctuary Records.

Neat Records was arguably the most instrumental label in the revival of heavy metal in the early 1980s in the UK. The movement was known as the new wave of British heavy metal or NWOBHM for short. The label is most notable for the early releases of Newcastle band Venom who are widely credited with the invention of black metal. While none of Neat Records' acts really broke through to the mainstream themselves, Venom, Raven, Blitzkrieg and Jaguar particularly are acknowledged as major influences on a host of major American thrash metal bands such as Metallica, Megadeth and Anthrax.

Other notable acts to release music through Neat Records include Warfare, White Spirit (notable as the then band of current Iron Maiden guitarist Janick Gers) and Persian Risk (notable as the original band of Motörhead guitarist Phil Campbell).

== Discography ==
Singles

- 01 Motorway - "All I Wanna Be Is Your Romeo" 7" (ST)
- 02 Janie McKenzie - "One and Only Girl" 7" (ST)
- 03 Tygers of Pan Tang - "Don't Touch Me There / Burnin' Up / Bad Times" 7" (ST)
- 04 Fist - "Name, Rank And Serial Number / You'll Never Get Me in One of Those" 7" (ST)
- 05 White Spirit - "Back to The Grind / Cheetah" 7" (KN)
- 06 Raven - "Don't Need Your Money / Wiped Out" 7" (ST)
- 07 Aragorn - "Black Ice" 7" (KN)
- 08 Venom - "In League with Satan / Live Like an Angel, Die Like a Devil" 7" (ST)
- 09 Bitches Sin - "Always Ready for Love / Sign of the Times" 7" (KN)
- 10 Blitzkrieg - "Buried Alive / Blitzkrieg" 7" (KN)
- 11 Raven - "Hard Ride / Crazy World" 7" (ST)
- 12 Raw Deal - "Lonewolf / Take the Sky" 7" (KN)
- 13 Venom - "Bloodlust / In Nomine Satanas" 7" (KN)
- 14 Steel - "Rock Out / All Systems Go" 7" (KN)
- 15 Raven - "Crash, Bang, Wallop / Rock Hard" 7" (KN)
- 15-12 Raven - "Crash, Bang, Wallop" 12" (4 track EP)(KN)
- 16 Jaguar - "Axe Crazy / War Machine" 7" (KN)
- 17 Heavy Pettin' - "Roll the Dice / Love Times Love" 7" (KN)
- 18 Dedringer - "Hot Lady / Hot Licks And Rock 'n' Roll" 7" (KN)
- 19 Crucifixion - "Take It or Leave It / On the Run" 7" (KN)
- 20 Warrior - "Dead When It Comes to Love / Kansas City / Stab in the Back" 7" (KN)
- 21 Fist - "The Wanderer / Too Hot" 7" (KN)
- 22 Valhalla - "Comin' Home" 7" (KN)
- 23 Sabre - "Miracle Man / On the Loose" 7" (KN)
- 24 Persian Risk - "Ridin' High / Hurt You" 7" (KN)
- 25-12 Various - One Take No Dubs 12" (4 track EP, Black Rose, Hellanbach, Alien, Avenger) (KN)
- 26 Jess Cox - "Bridges" 7" (KN)
- 27 Venom - "Die Hard / Acid Queen" 7" (KN)
- 27-12 Venom - "Die Hard / Acid Queen / Bursting Out" 12" (KN)
- 28 Raven - "Break the Chain / Ballad of Marshall Stack" 7" (KN)
- 29 Raven - "Born to Be Wild / Inquisitor" 7" (KN)
- 29P Raven - "Born to Be Wild / Inquisitor" 7" (KN)
- 29-12 Raven - "Born to Be Wild / Inquisitor / Break the Chain" 12" (KN)
- 30 Saracen - "We Have Arrived / Face in the Crowd" 7" (KN)
- 31 Avenger - "Too Wild to Tame / On the Rocks" 7" (KN)
- 32 Tobruk - "Wild on the Run / The Show Must Go On" 7" (KN)
- 33 Tysondog - "Eat the Rich / Dead Meat" 7" (KN)
- 34 Emerson - "Something Special" 7" (KN)
- 35 Jess Cox - "One in a Million" 7" (KN)
- 36 Valhalla - "Still in Love with You" 7" (KN)
- 37 Crucifixion - "Green Eyes / Moon Rising / Jailbait" 7" (KN)
- 37-12 Crucifixion - "Green Eyes / Moon Rising / Jailbait" 12" (KN)
- 38 Venom - "Warhead / Lady Lust" 7" (With 3 different sleeves)(KN)
- 38P Venom - "Warhead / Lady Lust" 7" (Mauve vinyl)(KN)
- 38-12 Venom - "Warhead / Lady Lust / 7 Gates of Hell" 7" (KN)
- 38P-12 Venom - "Warhead / Lady Lust / 7 Gates of Hell" 12" (KN)
- 39 TNT - "Back on the Road / Rockin' the Night" 7" (KN)
- 40 Glasgow - "Stranded / Heat of the Night" 7" (KN)
- 41 Warfare - "Noise, Filth and Fury" 7" (KN)
- 42 Mammath - "Rock Me / Rough 'n' Ready" 7" (KN)
- 43 Venom - "Manitou / Woman" 7" (KN)
- 43P Venom - "Manitou / Woman" 7" (KN)
- 43-12 Venom - "Manitou / Woman / Dead of the Night" 12" (KN)
- SHAPE 43 Venom - "Manitou / Woman" 7" (KN)
- 43SC Venom - "Manitou" Cassette Single (KN)
- 44-12* Lone Wolf - "Nobody's Move / Town to Town / Leave Me Behind" 12" (KN)
- 45-12* Warfare - "Two Tribes / Hell / Blown to Bits" 12" (KN)
- 46 Tysondog - "Shoot to Kill / Hammerhead" 7" (KN)
- 46-12 Tysondog - "Shoot to Kill / Hammerhead / Changling / Back to the Bullet! 12" (KN)
- 47 Venom - "Nightmare / Satanachist" 7" (KN)
- 47S Venom - "Nightmare / Satanachist" 7" (KN)
- 47-12 Venom - "Nightmare / Satanachist / FOAD / Warhead (live)" 12" (2 different sleeves)(KN)
- 47-12SP Venom - "Nightmare / Satanachist / FOAD / Warhead (live)" 12" (KN)
- 47SC Venom - "Nightmare" Cassette Single (6 track cassette)(KN)
- 48-12 Black Rose - "Nightmare / Need a Lot of Lovin' / Rock Me Hard / Breakaway" 12" (KN)
- 49-12 Warfare - Total Death EP 12" (4 track EP)(KN)
- 50 She - "Never Surrender / Breaking Away" 7" (KN)
- 50-12 She - "Never Surrender / Breaking Away / On My Way" 12" (KN)
- 52 State Trooper - "She Got the Look" 7" (KN)
- 52-12 State Trooper - "She Got the Look" 12" (KN)
- 53-12 Venom - Hell At Hammersmith EP 12" (3 track live EP, limited to 10,000)(KN)
- 55-12 Atomkraft - "Queen of Death" 12" (KN)
- 56 Tysondog - "School's Out / Don't Let the Bastards Grind You Down" 7" (KN)
- 56-12 Tysondog - School's Out / Don't Let The Bastards Grind You Down /Back to the Bullet 12" (KN)
- 57 Shotgun Brides - "Restless" 7" (KN)
- 58 Warfare - "Addicted to Love" 7" (KN) (White label only never released)
- 60-12 Mantas - "Deceiver" 12" (KN)
- 63 Carl & the Passion - "Everybody Walks Too Fast/How Do You Get Home" 7"
- ISAX1047 Axis - "Lady" 7" (released on Metal Minded label) (KN)
- MM2 Badge - "Silver Woman" 7" (released on Metal Minded label)

Albums

- 1000 Various - Lead Weight LP (KN)
- 1001 Raven - Rock Until You Drop LP
- 1001P Raven - Rock Until You Drop LP
- 1002 Venom - Welcome To Hell LP (KN)
- 1002P Venom - Welcome To Hell LP (KN)
- 1003 Fist - Back with a Vengeance LP (KN)
- 1004 Raven - Wiped Out LP (KN)
- 1005 Venom - Black Metal LP (KN)
- 1005P Venom - Black Metal LP (KN)
- 1006 Hellanbach - Now Hear This LP (KN)
- 1007 Jaguar - Power Games LP (KN)
- 1008 Geordie - No Sweat LP (KN)
- 1009 Dedringer - Second Rising LP (KN)
- 1010 Jess Cox - Third Step LP (KN)
- 1011 Raven - All for One LP
- 1012 Satan - Court in the Act LP (KN)
- 1013 Cloven Hoof - Cloven Hoof LP (KN)
- 1014 Various - Metal Battle LP (KN)
- 1015 Venom - At War with Satan LP (KN)
- 1015P Venom - At War with Satan LP (KN)
- 1016 Saracen - Change of Heart LP (KN)
- 1017 Tysondog - Beware of the Dog LP (KN)
- 1018 Avenger - Blood Sports LP (KN)
- 1019 Hellanbach - The Big H LP (KN)
- 1020 Raven - Live at the Inferno LP
- 1021 Warfare - Pure Filth LP (KN)
- 1022 Phasslayne - Cut It Up LP (KN)
- 1023 Blitzkrieg - A Time of Changes LP (KN)
- 1024 Venom - Possessed LP (KN)
- 1024P Venom - Possessed LP (KN)
- 1025 Axewitch - Visions of the Past LP (KN)
- 1026 Avenger - Killer Elite LP (KN)
- 1027 Wishbone Ash - Raw to the Bone LP
- 1027P Wishbone Ash - Raw to the Bone LP
- 1028 Atomkraft - Future Warriors LP (KN)
- 1029 Warfare - Metal Anarchy LP (KN)
- 1030 Artillery - Fear of Tomorrow LP
- 1031 Tysondog - Crimes of Insanity LP (KN)
- 1032 Venom - Eine kleine Nachtmusik LP (KN)
- 1033 Various - Powertrax LP (KN)
- 1034 Black Rose - Walk It How You Talk It LP (KN)
- 1035 Deaf Dealer - Keeper of the Flame LP (KN)
- 1036 War Machine - Unknown Soldier LP (KN)
- 1037 Tygers of Pan Tang - First Kill LP (KN)
- 1038 Artillery - Terror Squad LP
- 1039 Peer Gunt - Back Seat LP
- 1040 Warfare - Mayhem, Fuckin' Mayhem LP (KN)
- 1041 Atomkraft - Conductors of Noise LP (KN)
- 1042 Mantas - Winds of Change LP (KN)
- 1043 Slutt - Model Youth LP
- 1044 Warfare - Conflict of Hatred LP (KN)
- 1045 Shotgun Brides - Nothin' Ventured LP (KN)
- 1046 Artillery - Artillery 3 LP
- 1047 Decimator - Carnage City State Mosh Patrol LP (KN)
- 1048 Cronos - Dancing in the Fire LP (KN)
- 1049 Cockney Rejects - Lethal LP
- D1051 Cronos - Rock 'n' Roll Disease CD (KN)
- D1052 Decimator - Dirty, Hot and Hungry CD (KN)

== Compilations ==
There have been a number of complications released which feature tracks exclusively from the Neat Records catalogue.

- The Neat Singles Collection Vol. 1
- The Neat Singles Collection Vol. 2
- The Neat Singles Collection Vol. 3
- The Flame Burns On: The Best of Neat Records

== See also ==
- List of record labels
- Venom (band)
- NWOBHM
