= Wiped Out (Raven album) =

Studio album by Raven
- Released: 3 June 1982
- Recorded: 1982
- Studio: Impulse Studios (Wallsend, England)
- Genre: Heavy metal; speed metal
- Length: 51:53
- Label: Neat
- Producer: Raven and Keith Nichol

Raven chronology
Rock Until You Drop (1981)	Wiped Out (1982)	All for One (1983)

Professional ratings
Review scores
Source	Rating
AllMusic	4.5/5 stars
Collector's Guide to Heavy Metal	10/10

Wiped Out is the second full-length album by British heavy metal band Raven, released in 1982.

== Reception ==
In 2005, Wiped Out was ranked number 495 in Rock Hard magazine's book The 500 Greatest Rock & Metal Albums of All Time.

== Track listing ==
All songs written by Gallagher, Gallagher, and Hunter.

Side one
No.	Title	Length
1.	"Faster than the Speed of Light"	4:22
2.	"Bring the Hammer Down"	4:19
3.	"Fire Power"	3:08
4.	"Read All About It"	3:01
5.	"To the Limit – To the Top"	7:54
6.	"Battle Zone"	3:34

Side two
No.	Title	Length
7.	"Live at the Inferno!"	3:54
8.	"Star War"	5:35
9.	"UXB"	3:25
10.	"20/21"	1:36
11.	"Hold Back the Fire"	5:40
12.	"Chain Saw"	5:17

CD reissue bonus tracks
No.	Title	Length
13.	"Crash Bang Wallop"	3:03
14.	"Run Them Down"	2:59
15.	"Rock Hard"	3:06
16.	"20/21" (outtake)	1:44

== Personnel ==
Raven

- John Gallagher – lead vocals, bass, bass pedals
- Mark Gallagher – guitar, backing vocals
- Rob Hunter – drums, backing vocals

Production

- Keith Nichol – producer, engineer
