= Rock Until You Drop =

Studio album by Raven
- Released: January 1981
- Recorded: 1980
- Studios: Impulse Studios (Wallsend, England)
- Genres: Heavy metal; speed metal
- Length: 46:36
- Label: Neat
- Producers: Steve Thompson and Raven

Raven chronology
Rock Until You Drop (1981)	Wiped Out (1982)

Singles from Rock Until You Drop
- 1. "Don't Need Your Money" / "Wiped Out" Released: 1980; 2. "Hard Ride" / "Crazy World" Released: 1981

Professional ratings
Review scores
Source	Rating
AllMusic	4.5/5 stars
Collector's Guide to Heavy Metal	8/10

Rock Until You Drop is the first full-length album by British heavy metal band Raven, released in 1981. The album was the first of many heavy metal studio albums issued by British independent label Neat Records. It reached position No. 63 in the UK Albums Chart.

The song "Lambs to the Slaughter" was covered by German thrash metal band Kreator on their Out of the Dark... Into the Light EP, added to the re-mastered Terrible Certainty CD in 2000.

== Music ==
Alex Henderson of AllMusic said Raven were "a product of the late-'70s/early-'80s British metal explosion" similar to Iron Maiden, Def Leppard, Girlschool, and Saxon. According to him, "Raven was heavily influenced by Judas Priest, but projected an appealing, testosterone-driven personality of its own."

== Reception and legacy ==
Alex Henderson of AllMusic gave the album four and a half stars out of five. "Raven quickly went downhill after signing with Atlantic in 1985, but before that, the metal/hard rock outfit showed a fair amount of promise. [...] If headbangers allot themselves only one Raven CD, Rock Until You Drop is the ideal choice."

== Track listing ==
All songs written by Gallagher, Gallagher and Hunter, except where noted.

Side one
No.	Title	Length
1.	"Hard Ride"	3:10
2.	"Hell Patrol"	4:43
3.	"Don't Need Your Money"	3:22
4.	"Over the Top"	3:51
5.	"39-40"	0:51
6.	"For the Future"	4:04

Side two
No.	Title	Writer(s)	Length
7.	"Rock Until You Drop"		4:02
8.	"Nobody's Hero"		3:50
9.	"Hellraiser / Action" (Sweet cover)	Chinn, Chapman, Scott, Connolly, Priest, Tucker	4:21
10.	"Lambs to the Slaughter"		3:51
11.	"Tyrant of the Airways"		7:16

CD reissue bonus tracks
No.	Title	Length
12.	"Wiped Out"	4:30
13.	"Crazy World"	3:57
14.	"Inquisitor"	3:53

== Personnel ==
=== Raven ===
- John Gallagher – lead vocals, bass, classical guitar
- Mark Gallagher – guitars, backing vocals
- Rob Hunter – drums, percussion, backing vocals

=== Production ===
- Steve Thompson – producer
- Mickey Sweeney – engineer
