= Raven (band) =

English heavy metal band

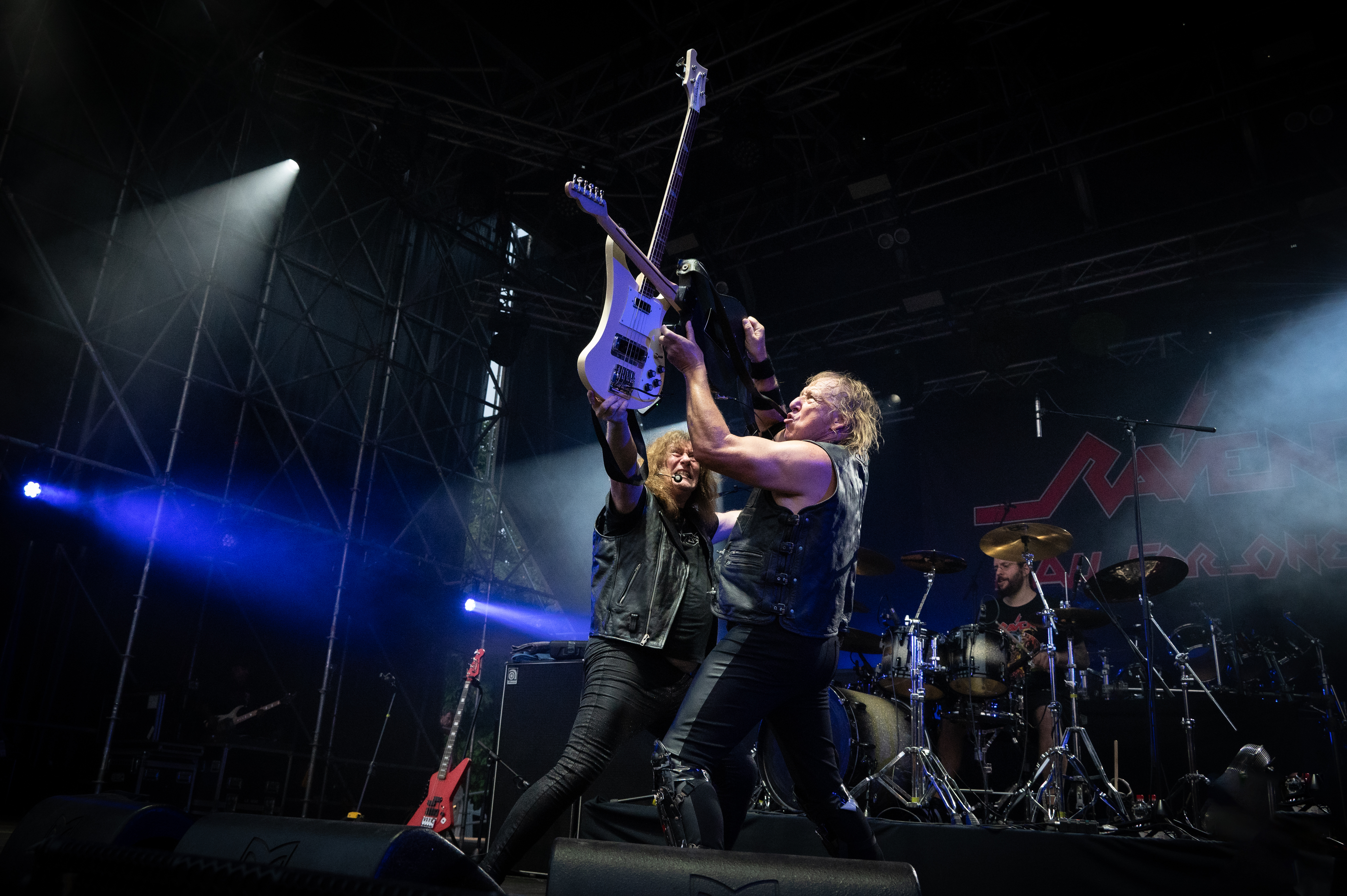
- Raven performing live in 2023

Background information
- Origin: Newcastle, England
- Genres: Heavy metal; speed metal
- Years active: 1974–present
- Labels: Neat; Megaforce; Atlantic; Combat
- Members: John Gallagher; Mark Gallagher; Mike Heller
- Past members: Paul Bowden; Paul Sherrif; Mike "Mick" Kenworthy; Sean Taylor; Pete Shore; Rob "Wacko" Hunter; Joe Hasselvander
- Website: ravenlunatics.com

Raven are an English heavy metal band, formed in 1974 by the Gallagher brothers, bassist and vocalist John and guitarist Mark. They have released fifteen studio albums to date, and had a hit with the single "On and On". Often referred to as "athletic rock" due to their tendency to wearing sports equipment during live sets, the band gained notoriety as part of the early-to-mid 1980s new wave of British heavy metal (NWOBHM) scene and is considered to be an influence and inspiration on the development of the thrash metal genre, including "the big four" (Metallica, Slayer, Megadeth and Anthrax), as well as other bands such as Testament, Exodus, Overkill, Kreator, Destruction, Sodom, Onslaught, Death Angel, Flotsam and Jetsam, Coroner, Annihilator, and Razor. Raven are also notable for headlining Metallica's first-ever national tour in 1983.

== History ==
=== Formation (1974–1979) ===
Raven was formed in 1974 in Newcastle, England, by brothers John and Mark Gallagher, and Paul Bowden.

The band began creating a sound which was rooted in British hard rock, with progressive rock tendencies and a willingness to take musical chances. Raven's highly energized live show and interaction between band members developed a unique image and style of play, described as "athletic". They began wearing guards, helmets, and plates from various sports (hockey, baseball, etc.), and incorporating them into the playing of their instruments (for instance, elbow pads and hockey masks were used to strike cymbals). Their music began to develop into a unique amalgam of speed and power – heavily influencing the genres of speed/thrash metal and power metal.

They started by playing local pubs and working men's clubs in the North East of England – occasionally opening shows for punk bands such as the Stranglers and the Motors.

=== Early years (1980–1983) ===
Eventually, the band signed with Neat Records, a low-budget metal label based in Newcastle, England. They released their first single, "Don't Need Your Money", in 1980 and embarked on a number of UK shows opening for bands such as Ozzy Osbourne's Blizzard of Ozz, Motörhead, Whitesnake, and Iron Maiden. Raven's first album, Rock Until You Drop, was released to critical acclaim in 1981, leading the band to tour Italy and the Netherlands. Their second album, Wiped Out, was released in 1982, and was influential on creating the burgeoning thrash and speed metal genres, making their only appearance in the UK Albums Chart, with the collection peaking at No. 63.

Sufficient noise was made for the American market to take notice and New Jersey's Megaforce Records signed them, issuing their next recording in the States as All for One in 1983. The band came stateside in 1983, and toured extensively on the "Kill 'em All for One" tour with young thrashers Metallica (on their first tour) as their opening act.

=== Commercial success (1984–1987) ===
The manager and founder of Megaforce Jon Zazula believed that Raven was major-label material, and kept them touring constantly until the big labels noticed. The Live at the Inferno recording, released in 1984, was a product of one of those tours. Raven contributed songs Hot Moves and Ladykiller to the soundtrack for the 1984 movie Hot Moves. Atlantic Records signed Raven to a worldwide contract after a minor bidding war (major label contracts would follow for Metallica and Anthrax in the following year). The band moved its permanent base from Newcastle to New York City.

Stay Hard was released in 1985, and proved a minor hit on the strength of single and video "On and On". The Atlantic years proved to be less than stellar for the band. A drastic shift in a more commercial direction came at the label's behest, with many die-hard fans being alienated by the slick, lightweight production of The Pack Is Back. However, the band redeemed themselves with a return to form on the Mad EP in 1986 and the Life's a Bitch album in 1987, before arranging their departure from Atlantic.

After the tour for Life's a Bitch, drummer Rob "Wacko" Hunter left the band in late 1987, to spend more time with his new wife and family. He later pursued a career in audio production and engineering, eventually working with jazz musicians Branford Marsalis and Harry Connick Jr.

=== Post-Atlantic era (1987–2000) ===
Joe Hasselvander (ex-Pentagram) joined as drummer in late 1987, and the band dropped the outlandish image for a more conventional denim-and-leather look for their 1988 album Nothing Exceeds Like Excess, which was self-produced and continued the band's return to form with fast, involved compositions. A concert at the Trocadero Theatre in Philadelphia was released by Combat Records as Ultimate Revenge 2 in 1989, and featured the band on four cuts, alongside a number of thrash bands such as Death, Forbidden, Dark Angel, and Faith or Fear. Next was a US tour opening for Testament, and then a European tour with German band Kreator. The advent of grunge and the dissolution of their record label Combat Records led the band to concentrate on continental Europe and Japan, where they retained more of a following.

In 1990, the band recorded the album Architect of Fear in Germany (again self-produced) showcasing the band's heavier side. They toured Europe in 1991 as special guests of German band Running Wild. 1992 saw the band releasing an EP called Heads Up, featuring four new studio songs and three live tracks from the 1991 tour. They again toured Europe with German band Risk as openers.

The band spent the first half of 1993 writing and demoing new material; delays ensued due to John Gallagher having a house fire and thieves stealing guitars from the remains. In the following year, the band regrouped and inked a deal with Japanese label Zero – an album entitled Glow was recorded at Showplace Studios, Dover, New Jersey. The album was self-produced and varied in feel, even sporting a few ballads alongside heavier material such as "Altar" and "Enemy". A cover of Thin Lizzy's "The Rocker" also made the album. Also in 1994, the band attended and played live at the Foundations Forum metal convention in Burbank, California, alongside acts such as Korn, Yngwie Malmsteen, and Machine Head.

The band toured Japan for the first time in May 1995. Raven was also touring Europe irregularly. A live album called Destroy All Monsters/Live in Japan was recorded featuring songs from Glow, as well as older cuts such as "For the Future".

1996 was spent writing and recording the new studio album Everything Louder, with the sessions taking place in Manassas, Virginia at future Bret Michaels guitarist Pete Evick's studio. The recording was a frantic affair done over four weekends with almost no rehearsal to get a "live" feel onto tape. The album came out in 1997 in Japan, Europe and the US, and the band went on the road in Europe with support acts Tank and HammerFall.

1999 promised a Raven box set with the New York label Spitfire Records. However, after a "lack of communication" John took the extra live/studio/bootleg tracks and working with engineer S.A. Adams compiled a collection entitled Raw Tracks, featuring unreleased material from 1984 to the present. The band also reunited with producer Michael Wagener and worked on an album titled One for All recorded at Wagener's Wireworld Studio in Nashville, Tennessee. Following its release, the band toured opening for old friend Udo Dirkschneider's band U.D.O. in Europe, followed by a US tour with U.D.O. in 2000.

=== Mark Gallagher's accident, hiatus and Walk Through Fire (2001–2014) ===
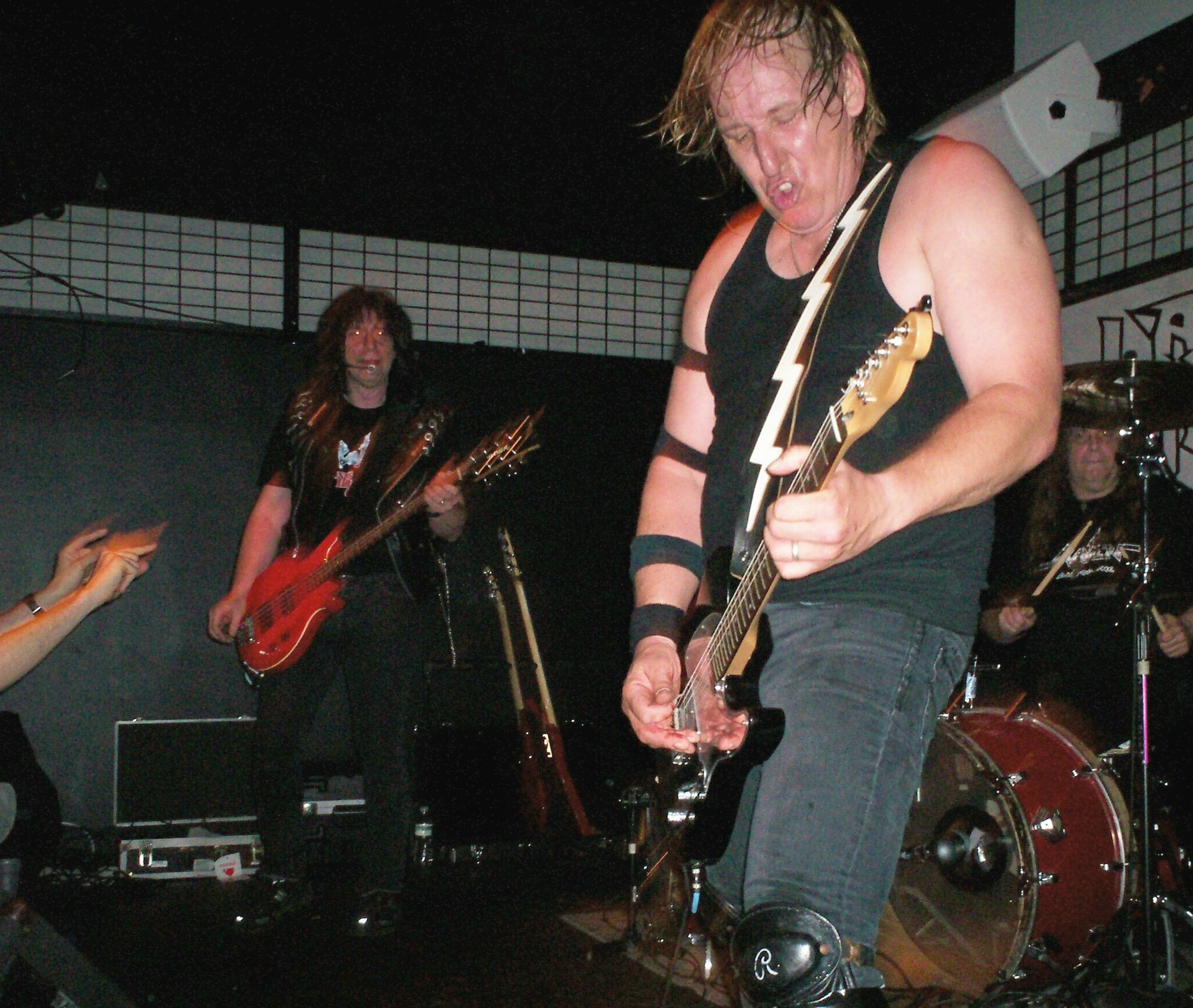
Raven performing in 2008

The band recorded and toured until 2001, when a wall collapsed on guitarist Mark Gallagher, crushing his legs. Raven went on hiatus for nearly four years, from 2001 to 2004, while the guitarist rehabilitated. A number of shows were played in 2004 with Mark in the North East of the US with him in a wheelchair.

Following a number of United States shows and European festival appearances (Bloodstock Open Air in the UK in 2005, Keep it True in Germany in 2005, Bang Your Head!!! in Germany in 2006) the band started work on the new album Walk Through Fire, initially released in Japan on King Records in 2009, then securing releases in 2010 for Europe on SPV and in North America on Metal Blade. The album was well received both critically and by the fans, and the band have been steadily playing live, playing the European festival circuit, making a triumphant return to Japan, and playing their first shows in South America, returning there in 2012.

In 2013, a retrospective DVD was released, entitled Rock Until You Drop – A Long Day's Journey, featuring never before seen footage of the band from 1982 onward, interviews with musicians including; Lars Ulrich, Dee Snider, Dave Ellefson, Chuck Billy, Jon Zazula, and Chris Jericho. The band played its first full-scale tour of the US since 1989 headlining on the East Coast and joining forces for a double headlining jaunt through the West Coast with fellow UK heavy metal band Diamond Head. November and December had the band playing Europe with old mates Girlschool as support, garnering favorable reviews for the energetic performances.

In January 2014, the band were featured on the 70000 Tons of Metal cruise from Miami to Mexico and played in South America in March. Metallica invited the band to open for them at a football stadium in São Paulo, Brazil in March 2014 in front of almost 70,000 fans. The band started work on a new album, ExtermiNation, in September 2014, and were special guests on three United States showcase gigs with Accept. They then played a 43-date United States tour in October and November.

=== ExtermiNation (2015–2016) ===
In order to cover additional recording costs for a new album to be titled ExtermiNation, the band initiated a Kickstarter crowdfunding project; in the process they recorded eleven songs for a cover album entitled Party Killers exclusively for the contributors. The album rehearsals and recording of Party Killers were held at Etching Tin Studios in Richmond, Virginia.

As with the Walk Through Fire album, ExtermiNation was recorded at Assembly Line Studios in Vienna, Virginia with Kevin "131" Guitierrez engineering and the band producing. Recording took place in August 2014 with a short break as the band played special guest on three shows by German band Accept in the US. The band spent a lot of time in the writing/arranging phase of the project; actual recording took approximately two weeks.

ExtermiNation was released in late April 2015 and consists of 14 songs plus the bonus track "Malice in Geordieland" (sung entirely in the Newcastle "Geordie" accent). It was released worldwide via SPV, except in Japan via Spiritual Beast and in South America via Die Hard. The album garnered both favorable fan reaction and critical acclaim noting the production, songwriting, performances and especially the aggression of the band which harkened back to the early albums. A lyric video for "Destroy All Monsters" kicked off the album release, followed by a band video for "Tank Treads – The Blood Runs Red" In 2015, the band played their first shows in Colombia (in Pereira and Bogotá), where they were present for a 6.2 earthquake; then, the Pentaport Festival in South Korea was followed by dates in Japan. After a two-week run of dates in the United States, the band embarked on their longest headline European tour for many years from September through October, visiting a number of countries for the first time.

=== New drummer, Metal City and All Hell's Breaking Loose (2017–present) ===
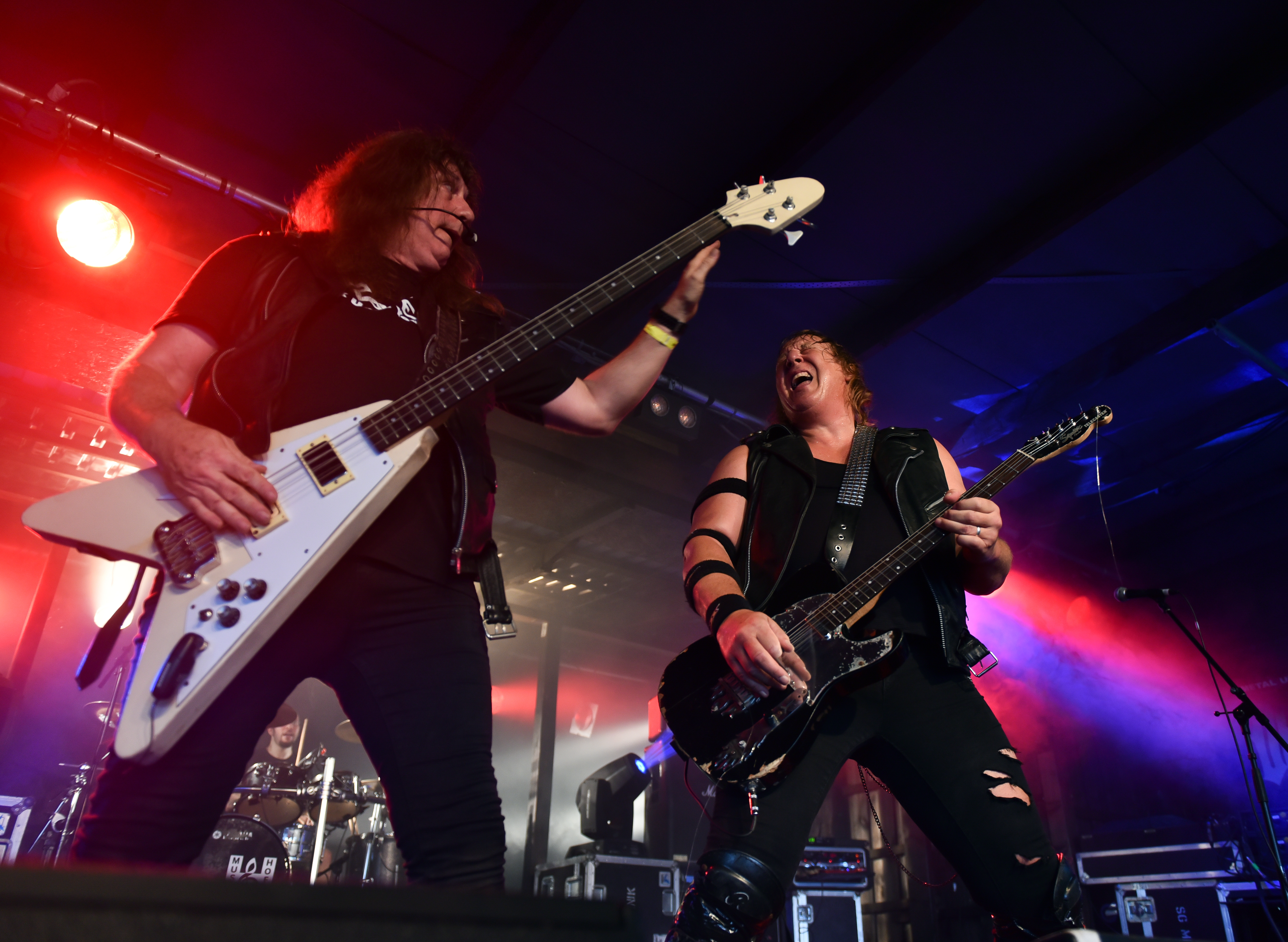
Raven at Headbangers Open Air 2017 in Germany

In May 2017, Joe Hasselvander suffered a heart attack two days before a string of US/European dates. In order to fulfill these obligations, the Gallagher brothers had a number of drummers to assist. Jimmy Mess did the Chicago show, Mike Heller (Fear Factory, Malignancy) performed on three US dates, Fabio Alessandrini (Annihilator) did the Muskelrock (Sweden) festival, and Dave Chedrick did the 11-date tour of Europe. When it became obvious Joe Hasselvander would not be physically able to play drums for the foreseeable future, the Gallagher brothers invited Heller to play the upcoming Euro festival dates they had booked (Bang Your Head, Leyendes Del Rock, Headbangers Open Air, Metaldays and Alcatraz), as his playing was a perfect fit. The band then embarked upon a 70-date European run with 50 dates as special guests on the Udo Dirkschneider "Back to the Roots 2" tour and 20 select headline shows.

Raven released their fourteenth studio album, Metal City, on 18 September 2020. It marked their first studio album in five years, and their first to feature Mike Heller on drums.

In July 2022, Raven announced that they had signed to Silver Lining Music and released their fifteenth studio album, All Hell's Breaking Loose in 2023. The band played at Milwaukee Metal Fest in May of that year.

== Band members ==
Current

- John Gallagher – bass, lead vocals (1974–present)
- Mark Gallagher – guitars, backing vocals (1974–present)
- Mike Heller – drums (2017–present)

Touring

- Manos Kehagias – drums (2013)
- Spiros Antonatos – drums (2013)
- Nick Papadopoulos – drums (2013)
- Fabio Alessandrini – drums (2017)
- Jimmy Mess – drums (2017)
- Dave Chedrick – drums (2017)

Former

- Paul Bowden – guitars, backing vocals (1974–1979)
- Paul Sherrif – drums (1974–1976)
- Mike "Mick" Kenworthy – drums (1976–1977)
- Sean Taylor – drums (1977–1979)
- Pete Shore – guitars, backing vocals (1979–1980)
- Rob "Wacko" Hunter – drums, backing vocals (1979–1987)
- Joe Hasselvander – drums, backing vocals (1987–2017)

Lineups

1974–1975	1975–1976	1976–1977	1977–1979
John Gallagher – bass; Mark Gallagher – guitars; Paul Bowden – guitars	John Gallagher – bass, lead vocals; Mark Gallagher – guitars, backing vocals; Paul Bowden – guitars, backing vocals; Paul Sherrif – drums	John Gallagher – bass, lead vocals; Mark Gallagher – guitars, backing vocals; Paul Bowden – guitars, backing vocals; Mike "Mick" Kenworthy – drums	John Gallagher – bass, lead vocals; Mark Gallagher – guitars, backing vocals; Paul Bowden – guitars, backing vocals; Sean Taylor – drums
1979	1979–1980	1980–1987	1987–2017
John Gallagher – bass, lead vocals; Mark Gallagher – guitars, backing vocals; Pete Shore – guitars, backing vocals; Sean Taylor – drums	John Gallagher – bass, lead vocals; Mark Gallagher – guitars, backing vocals; Pete Shore – guitars, backing vocals; Rob "Wacko" Hunter – drums	John Gallagher – bass, lead vocals, classical guitar; Mark Gallagher – guitars, backing vocals, guitar synthesizer, synthesizers; Rob "Wacko" Hunter – drums, backing vocals	John Gallagher – bass, lead vocals, synthesizers; Mark Gallagher – guitars, backing vocals; Joe Hasselvander – drums, backing vocals
2017–present
John Gallagher – bass, lead vocals; Mark Gallagher – guitars, backing vocals; Mike Heller – drums

== Discography ==
Studio albums

- Rock Until You Drop (1981)
- Wiped Out (1982)
- All for One (1983)
- Stay Hard (1985)
- The Pack Is Back (1986)
- Life's a Bitch (1987)
- Nothing Exceeds Like Excess (1988)
- Architect of Fear (1991)
- Glow (1994)
- Everything Louder (1997)
- One For All (1999)
- Walk Through Fire (2009)
- ExtermiNation (2015)
- Metal City (2020)
- All Hell's Breaking Loose (2023)

== See also ==
- List of new wave of British heavy metal bands
