= Turn to Stone (album) =

Compilation album by Pentagram
- Released: 2002
- Genre: Doom metal, heavy metal
- Label: Peaceville Records

Pentagram chronology
Sub-Basement (2001)	Turn to Stone (2002)	A Keg Full of Dynamite (2003)

Turn to Stone is a compilation album by American doom metal band Pentagram, comprising songs from their first three albums (Relentless, Day of Reckoning and Be Forewarned). It was released by Peaceville Records in 2002.

== Track listing ==
1. "Petrified"-5:54 (Bobby Liebling/Joe Hasselvander) (from Be Forewarned)
2. "Wartime"-5:22 (Victor Griffin) (from Day of Reckoning)
3. "All Your Sins"-4:36 (Liebling/Griffin) (from Relentless)
4. "Frustration"-3:36 (Liebling) (from Be Forewarned)
5. "Burning Savior"-9:06 (Griffin/Liebling) (from Day of Reckoning)
6. "Sinister"-4:31 (Griffin) (from Relentless)
7. "Bride of Evil"-4:34 (Hasselvander) (from Be Forewarned)
8. "When the Screams Come"-3:40 (Liebling) (from Day of Reckoning)
9. "Relentless"-3:47 (Griffin) (from Relentless)
10. "Vampyre Love"-3:41 (Griffin) (from Be Forewarned)
11. "Evil Seed"-4:39 (Griffin) (from Day of Reckoning)
12. "The Ghoul"-5:12 (Hasselvander/Liebling) (from Relentless)
13. "Wolf's Blood"-4:26 (Griffin) (from Be Forewarned)
14. "Madman"-4:12 (Liebling) (from Day of Reckoning)
15. "20 Buck Spin"-4:18 (Liebling) (from Relentless)
16. "Death Row"-4:11 (Griffin) (from Relentless)
17. "Live Free & Burn"-3:09 (Griffin/Hasselvander) (from Be Forewarned)

== Lineup ==
- Bobby Liebling – vocals
- Victor Griffin – guitar
- Martin Swaney – bass
- Joe Hasselvander – drums
