= Sub-Basement =

Studio album by Pentagram
- Released: 2001
- Recorded: Polar Bear Lair Studios; February–June 2001
- Genre: Doom metal, heavy metal
- Length: 44:30
- Label: Black Widow
- Producer: Bobby Liebling, Joe Hasselvander, Chris Kozlowski

Pentagram chronology
First Daze Here (The Vintage Collection) (2001)	Sub-Basement (2001)	Turn to Stone (2002)

Professional ratings
Review scores
Source	Rating
AllMusic	link

Sub-Basement is the fifth album by American doom metal band Pentagram. It was released in 2001 by Italian label Black Widow Records. Joe Hasselvander played all the instruments, while Bobby Liebling provided all lead and backing vocals. The spine reads "If Review Your Choices made you sick, Sub-Basement will take you to the tomb!!!" According to the documentary Last Days Here, the title referenced Liebling's life of living in his parents' sub-basement in Germantown, Maryland.

== Track listing ==
(Songwriters listed in brackets.)

1. "Bloodlust" (Liebling) – 2:30
2. "Buzzsaw" (Liebling) – 2:29
3. "Drive Me to the Grave" (Hasselvander/Liebling) – 4:30
4. "Sub-Intro" (Hasselvander) – 4:00
5. "Sub-Basement" (Hasselvander/Liebling) – 6:00
6. "Go in Circles (Reachin' for an End)"(Hasselvander/Liebling/Palmer) – 5:16
7. "Mad Dog" (Liebling) – 2:17
8. "After the Last" (Hasselvander/Liebling) – 3:43
9. "Tidal Wave" (Hasselvander/Liebling) – 4:40
10. "Out of Luck" (Liebling) – 3:54
11. "Target" (Liebling) – 5:10
12. "Review Your Choices" (1999 unreleased outtake) – 3:31 *
13. "Megalania" (1999 unreleased outtake) – 6:58 *
- Bonus tracks on 2008 Season of Mist re-release

== Lineup ==
- Bobby Liebling – all lead and backing vocals
- Joe Hasselvander – all instruments
