= 1972–1979 (album) =

Compilation album by Pentagram
- Released: 1993
- Recorded: 1972–1978
- Genre: Doom metal; heavy metal
- Label: Peace Records

Pentagram chronology
Day of Reckoning (1987)	1972–1979 (1993)	Be Forewarned (1994)

1972–1979 is the first of many compilations featuring 1970s material of American doom metal band Pentagram. It was released by Peace Records in 1993. Pentagram frontman Bobby Liebling stated in a 2004 interview with Hellride Music that he gave permission for 500 copies to be issued, but had not received any royalties for this release. Most of the material was later released by Relapse Records on the First Daze Here and First Daze Here Too compilations. The mix of "Smokescreen" included on the 1972-1979 LP is different from the version included on the Relapse compilations and was not released on any other compilation after 1993.

== Track listing ==
1. "Hurricane"-2:05 (Bobby Liebling)
  - Recorded 1973 at Bias Studios
2. "Be Forewarned"-3:28 (Liebling)
  - Recorded 1972 at The Rothsceller
3. "Under My Thumb"-3:24 (The Rolling Stones)
  - Recorded 1974 at Track Studios
4. "Earth Flight"-2:54 (Liebling/Greg Mayne)
  - Recorded 1974 at National Sound Warehouse
5. "Wheel of Fortune"-4:04 (Liebling/Geof O'Keefe)
  - Recorded 1974 at National Sound Warehouse
6. "Walk in the Blue Light"-5:39 (Liebling)
  - Recorded 1973 at Bias Studios
7. "Smokescreen"-4:06 (Liebling/O'Keefe)
  - Recorded 1976 at Underground Sound
8. "Star Lady"-5:16 (Palmer/Liebling)
  - Recorded 1976 at Underground Sound
9. "Little Games"-3:04 (The Yardbirds)
  - Recorded 1976 at Underground Sound
10. "Much Too Young to Know"-4:40 (Liebling/O'Keefe)
  - Recorded 1976 at Underground Sound
11. "Livin' in a Ram's Head"-3:01 (Liebling)
  - Recorded 1978 at The Sound Box

== Lineups ==
- Bobby Liebling – vocals
- Geof O'Keefe – drums on tracks 1–10
- Vince McAllister – guitar on tracks 1–10
- Greg Mayne – bass on tracks 1–10
- Randy Palmer – guitar on tracks 3–5
- Marty Iverson – guitar on tracks 6–10
- Richard Kueht – guitar on track 11
- Paul Trowbridge – guitar on track 11
- Marty Swaney – bass on track 11
- Joe Hasselvander – drums on track 11
