= Last Rites (album) =

Studio album by Pentagram
- Released: April 12, 2011
- Genre: Doom metal, heavy metal
- Length: 45:18
- Label: Metal Blade
- Producer: Travis Wyrick

Pentagram chronology
First Daze Here Too (2006)	Last Rites (2011)	Curious Volume (2015)

Professional ratings
Review scores
Source	Rating
AllMusic	3.5/5 stars

Last Rites is the seventh studio album by American doom metal band Pentagram, released in 2011. It was the first album since 1994's Be Forewarned to feature guitarist Victor Griffin.

This album had been in the works for many years under the tentative title Last Rites of the Setting Sun. As indicated in the Last Days Here film, the original plan was to use remaining members Greg Mayne and Geof O'Keefe along with new musicians to round out the lineup for a release on Housecore Records, but things ultimately fell through. Frontman Bobby Liebling announced different songs on Myspace circa 2008 as the album progressed to fruition ("Everything's Turning to Night", "Horseman" and "Walk in the Blue Light" did make it to the album from the original intended track listing). The original intention for the album was to feature a lineup of Leibling, Russ Strahan, Mark Ammen and Gary Isom, but that lineup almost entirely changed as 2010 progressed, before recording sessions could be arranged. "South of the Swamp" and "I'm Takin' No More" were written and intended for the album, but ultimately were not included. Hank Williams III was also rumored to appear on the album at one point.

"Into the Ground" and "Nothing Left" originated from rehearsal tracks from the first Pentagram lineup, played in a faster and groovier tempo. "Old Man", from those same sessions, was originally intended for the album but ultimately not chosen.

Isom was originally intended to be the drummer for this album, but left the band shortly after their performance at Maryland Deathfest.

== Track listing ==
(Songwriters listed in brackets.)

1. "Treat Me Right" (Bobby Liebling) – 2:32
2. "Call the Man" (Liebling) – 3:49
3. "Into the Ground" (Liebling, Victor Griffin) – 4:21
4. "8" (Greg Turley, Liebling) – 5:01
5. "Everything's Turning to Night" (Liebling, Geof O'Keefe) – 3:17
6. "Windmills and Chimes" (Liebling) – 4:32
7. "American Dream" (Turley, Griffin) – 4:32
8. "Walk in the Blue Light" (Liebling) – 4:59
9. "Horseman" (Liebling) – 3:38
10. "Death in 1st Person" (Turley, Griffin) – 4:01
11. "Nothing Left" (Liebling) – 3:36
12. "All Your Sins (Reprise)" (Griffin, Liebling) – 0:57

== Lineup ==
- Bobby Liebling – lead vocals, backing vocals on track 7
- Victor Griffin – guitar, lead vocals on track 7
- Greg Turley – bass
- Tim Tomaselli – drums
- Maddox Turley – drums on track 12
