= Svart Records =

Finnish independent record company

- Founded: 2009
- Genre: Heavy metal, extreme metal
- Country of origin: Finland
- Location: Turku
- Official website: svartrecords.com

Svart Records is a Finnish independent record company focused on heavy metal music, especially doom metal. It concentrates mostly on releasing LP reissues of albums previously unavailable on vinyl.

== Discography ==
- Callisto, Providence 2LP (SVR001)
- Burning Saviours, Hundus LP (SVR002)
- Reverend Bizarre, Harbinger of Metal 2LP (SVR003)
- Steve Von Till, A Grave Is A Grim Horse LP (SVR004)
- Rippikoulu, Musta Seremonia CD/LP (SVR005)
- Last Calls, Last Calls mLP (SVR006)
- Katatonia, Dance Of December Souls 2LP (SVR007)
- Reverend Bizarre, In the Rectory of the Bizarre Reverend 2LP (SVR008)
- Hour of 13, Possession 7" (SVR009)
- Metsatöll, Äio 2LP (SVR010)
- Kalmah, 12 Gauge LP (SVR011)
- Beherit, Engram LP (SVR012)
- Kiuas, Lustdriven LP (SVR013)
- Magnus Pelander, Magnus Pelander CD/LP (SVR014)
- Sweatmaster, Turn Over 7" (SVR015)
- Xysma, First & Magical LP (SVR016)
- Legend, Legend LP (SVR017)
- Orne/Blizaro, Return of the Sorcerer/One Step Into Oblivion (SVR019)
- The Gathering, Mandylion (SVR022)
- The Gathering, Nighttime Birds (SVR023)
- Steve Von Till, If I Should Fall To The Field LP (SVR026)
- Blowback, 800 Miles LP (SVR030)
- Sarcofagus, Live in Studio 1979 (SVR031)
- Sarcofagus, Cycle of Life (SVR032)
- Jussi Lehtisalo, Rotta LP (SVR034)
- Pentagram, Be Forewarned 2LP (SVR041)
- Killing Joke, Absolute Dissent 2LP (SVR042)
- Eero Koivistoinen & UMO Jazz Orchestra, Arctic Blues 3LP (SVR049)
- Abhorrence, Completely Vulgar CD/2LP (SVR099)
- Green Lung, Black Harvest (SVART285)
- Kati Rán, SÁLA (SVART474)
- JAAW, Supercluster
- Messa, Close

== See also ==
- List of record labels
