= Lightning in a Bottle (album) =

Studio album by Pentagram
- Released: January 31, 2025
- Studio: HeavyHead Recording
- Genres: Doom metal; heavy metal
- Length: 52:04
- Language: English
- Label: Heavy Psych Sounds Records

Pentagram chronology
| Curious Volume (2015) | Lightning in a Bottle (2025) |

Lightning in a Bottle is the ninth studio album by American doom metal band Pentagram, released on January 31, 2025 by Heavy Psych Sounds. In June 2024, the new incarnation of the band was revealed along with Liebling, Mos Generator musicians Tony Reed and Scooter Haslip (guitars and bass, respectively), and drummer Henry Vazquez of Saint Vitus, the Skull, Spirit Caravan and Sourvein.

== Reception ==
Professional ratings
Review scores
| Source | Rating |
|---|---|
| Angry Metal Guy | 2.5/5.0 |
| Metal Injection | 9/10 |
| Spectrum Culture | 68% |

Jeff Podoshen of Metal Injection praised Lightning in a Bottle as an "exemplar of what great doom metal should be", and scored the album a 9 out of 10. Will Pinfold of Spectrum Culture believes Pentagram has become a "legacy act" and their "legacy is unusually vague". Overall, he described the album with the highest point being "the best doom metal songs the band has recorded in years", and its lowest point was "fine but forgettable", and graded Lightning in a Bottle a 68%. Steel Druhm of Angry Metal Guy scored the album a 2.5/5.0, resulting in a "mixed" reception, where he believes that "their best days are far behind them".

== Track listing ==
All tracks are written by Liebling, Reed and Vasquez.

Lightning in a Bottle track listing
| No. | Title | Length |
|---|---|---|
| 1. | "Live Again" | 3:34 |
| 2. | "In The Panic Room" | 3:32 |
| 3. | "I Spoke To Death" | 3:40 |
| 4. | "Dull Pain" | 3:31 |
| 5. | "Lady Heroin" | 5:33 |
| 6. | "I'll Certainly See You In Hell" | 2:09 |
| 7. | "Thundercrest" | 3:02 |
| 8. | "Solve The Puzzle" | 3:13 |
| 9. | "Spread Your Wings" | 3:32 |
| 10. | "Lightning In A Bottle" | 4:41 |
| 11. | "Walk The Sociopath" | 4:50 |

== Personnel ==
- Bobby Liebling – vocals
- Tony Reed – guitar
- Scooter Haslip – bass
- Henry Vazquez - drums
