= Curious Volume =

Studio album by Pentagram
- Released: August 21, 2015
- Recorded: January 2015
- Studio: Magpie Studio / Lakeside / Evolution Productions Studio
- Genres: Doom metal, heavy metal
- Length: 41:58
- Label: Peaceville Records
- Producer: Mattias Nilsson

Pentagram chronology
Last Rites (2011)	Curious Volume (2015)	Lightning in a Bottle (2025)

Curious Volume is the eighth studio album by American doom metal band Pentagram. It was their first studio album to be released on Peaceville Records since 1994's Be Forewarned, and the first album to feature Pete Campbell on drums.

== Track listing ==
1. Lay Down and Die (Liebling) – 2:55
2. The Tempter Push (Griffin) – 4:09
3. Dead Bury Dead (Griffin) – 4:38
4. Earth Flight (Liebling) – 2:57
5. Walk Alone (Turley/Griffin) – 3:21
6. Curious Volume (Turley/Griffin) – 4:21
7. Misunderstood (Griffin) – 3:21
8. Close the Casket (Griffin) – 4:13
9. Sufferin' (Liebling) – 3:21
10. Devil's Playground (Turley)– 4:38
11. Because I Made It (Liebling) – 4:24

== Lineup ==
- Bobby Liebling – vocals
- Victor Griffin – guitar
- Greg Turley – bass
- "Minnesota" Pete Campbell – drums
