= Core values =

Core values may refer to:

- Core values, the most important principles, the first value category of the value system
- Core democratic values
- Core Values, a 2007 studio album by Sarcofagus
- Family values
- The core values of many military organizations:
  - Core values of the United States Marine Corps
  - Core values of the United States Navy
  - US Air Force Core Values
  - U.S. Coast Guard Core Values
