= Electric Wizard/Reverend Bizarre =

EP (split) by Electric Wizard and Reverend Bizarre
- Released: 5 September 2008
- Genre: Doom metal, stoner metal
- Label: Rise Above Records

Electric Wizard chronology
| Witchcult Today (2007) | Electric Wizard/Reverend Bizarre (2008) | The Processean (2008) |

Reverend Bizarre chronology
| III: So Long Suckers (2007) | Electric Wizard/Reverend Bizarre (2008) | Reverend Bizarre/Mr Velcro Fastener (2008) |

Electric Wizard/Reverend Bizarre is a split EP released by the English stoner/doom metal band Electric Wizard and the Finnish doom band Reverend Bizarre. It was released in 2008 through Rise Above Records. The Reverend Bizarre song is a cover of Finnish black metal band Beherit. The Electric Wizard track is exclusive to this release and takes its name from the novel by weird fiction author William Hope Hodgson.

== Release ==
The EP was released in two versions – a standard 12" vinyl version and a deluxe version on blood red vinyl that includes a poster and an uncensored cover with metallic lettering. The standard version is limited to 2000 (500 purple vinyl, 500 clear vinyl, 500 silver vinyl, 500 black vinyl), while the deluxe version is limited to 350.

The Reverend Bizarre track is also included on the compilation "Death is Glory...Now".

== Track listing ==
=== Electric Wizard ===
1. "The House on the Borderland" - 11:29

=== Reverend Bizarre ===
1. "The Gate of Nanna" (Beherit cover) - 11:16
