= Show 'Em How =

Studio album by Pentagram
- Released: 2004
- Recorded: The Polar Bear Lair Studios
- Genre: Doom metal, heavy metal
- Length: 49:42
- Label: Black Widow
- Producer: Bobby Liebling, Kelly Carmichael, Chris Kozlowski

Pentagram chronology
A Keg Full of Dynamite (2003)	Show 'Em How (2004)	First Daze Here Too (2006)

Professional ratings
Review scores
Source	Rating
AllMusic	3.5/5 stars

Show 'Em How is the sixth album by American doom metal band Pentagram. It was released in 2004 by Italian label Black Widow Records. This album featured Bobby Liebling on vocals backed up by three members of Internal Void. The spine reads "Further infections to feed your disease".

== Track listing ==
(Songwriters listed in brackets.)

1. "Wheel of Fortune" (Liebling/O'Keefe) – 3:47
2. "Elektra Glide" (Carmichael/Liebling) – 3:30
3. "Starlady" (Liebling/Palmer) – 5:23
4. "Catwalk" (Liebling) – 3:48
5. "Prayer for an Exit Before the Dead End" (Carmichael/Liebling) – 5:50
6. "Goddess" (Liebling) – 3:07
7. "City Romance" (Carmichael/Liebling) – 4:36
8. "If the Winds Would Change" (Liebling) – 4:42
9. "Show 'em How" (Liebling) – 5:06
10. "Last Days Here" (O'Keefe/Liebling) – 5:11

== Lineup ==
- Bobby Liebling – all lead and backing vocals
- Kelly Carmichael – guitar
- Adam Heinzmann – bass
- Mike Smail – drums
