= Turn to Stone =

Turn to Stone:

- Petrifaction in mythology and fiction
- "Turn to Stone" (Joe Walsh and Barnstorm song), from the 1972 album Barnstorm
- "Turn to Stone" (Electric Light Orchestra song), from the 1977 album Out of the Blue
- "Turn to Stone", a song by Black Sabbath from their 1986 album Seventh Star
- Turn to Stone (album), a 2002 album by Pentagram

== See also ==
- Turns into Stone, compilation album by The Stone Roses
- "Turns to Stone", a song by Steve Lukather from his 1989 album Lukather
