= 1972–1979 (Vol. 2) =

Compilation album by Pentagram
- Released: 1999
- Genre: Doom metal; heavy metal
- Label: Peace Records

Pentagram chronology
| Review Your Choices (1999) | 1972–1979 (Vol. 2) (1999) | First Daze Here (The Vintage Collection) (2001) |

1972–1979 (Vol. 2), released in 1999 by Peace Records, is one of many compilations by American doom metal band Pentagram featuring material recorded during the 1970s. Comments by Pentagram frontman Bobby Liebling regarding Peace Records indicate that this album is a bootleg.

== Track listing ==
1. "Forever My Queen"-2:31 (Bobby Liebling)
  - Recorded 1973 at Bias Studios
2. "When the Screams Come"-3:04 (Liebling)
  - Recorded 1973 at Bias Studios
3. "Review Your Choices"-3:01 (Liebling)
  - Recorded 1973 at Bias Studios
4. "20 Buck Spin"-5:00 (Liebling)
  - Recorded 1973 at Bias Studios
5. "Livin' in a Ram's Head"-2:17 (Liebling)
  - Recorded 1974 at National Sound
6. "When the Screams Come"-2:47 (Liebling)
  - Recorded 1974 at National Sound
7. "Teaser"-3:34 (Geof O'Keefe)
  - Recorded 1976 at Underground Sound
8. "Run My Course"-3:12 (Liebling)
  - Recorded 1975 at Columbia Studios
9. "Wheel of Fortune"-3:40 (Liebling/O'Keefe)
  - Recorded 1975 at Columbia Studios
10. "When the Screams Come"-2:42 (Liebling)
  - Recorded 1975 at Columbia Studios
11. "Lazy Lady"-3:34 (Liebling/O'Keefe)
  - Recorded 1972 at The Rathsceller
12. "Earth Flight"-3:13 (Liebling/Mayne)
  - Recorded 1973 at Bias Studios
13. "When the Screams Come"-4:14 (Liebling)
  - Recorded 1978 at The Sound Box
