= Human Hurricane =

Compilation album by Pentagram
- Released: 1998
- Recorded: 1973–1976
- Genres: Doom metal; heavy metal
- Length: 65:32
- Label: Downtime Records

Pentagram chronology
Be Forewarned (1994)	Human Hurricane (1998)	Review Your Choices (1999)

Professional ratings
Review scores
Source	Rating
AllMusic	3/5 stars
Collector's Guide to Heavy Metal	8/10

Human Hurricane is one of many compilations featuring 1970s material of American doom metal band Pentagram. It was released by Downtime Records in 1998. A vinyl version, retitled If the Winds Would Change (featuring tracks 2, 3, 4, 6, 8, 9, 10, 12, 15 and 17), was released in 2011 by High Roller Records.

== Track listing ==
All tracks are written by Bobby Liebling, except where noted.

No.	Title	Recorded at	Length
1.	"Forever My Queen"	Bias Studios, March 1973	2:22
2.	"The Bees"	The Warehouse, late 1973	2:31
3.	"Out of Luck"	The Warehouse, late 1973	3:50
4.	"Goddess"	The Warehouse, late 1973	2:32
5.	"Target"	The Warehouse, late 1973	7:37
6.	"Devil Child"	The Warehouse, late 1973	1:26
7.	"Much Too Young to Know" (Liebling, Geof O'Keefe)	Underground Sound, late 1976	4:37
8.	"If the Winds Would Change"	The Warehouse, late 1973	3:27
9.	"The Diver"	The Warehouse, late 1973	2:49
10.	"Rape"	The Warehouse, late 1973	5:11
11.	"Livin' in a Ram's Head"	National Sound Warehouse, June 1974	2:15
12.	"Buzzsaw"	The Warehouse, late 1973	2:36
13.	"Starlady" (Ranny Palmer, Liebling)	Underground Sound, late 1976	5:11
14.	"Show 'em How"	The Warehouse, late 1973	10:00
15.	"Downhill Slope"	The Warehouse, late 1973	4:18
16.	"Hurricane"	Bias Studios, June 1973	2:01
17.	"Burning Rays"	The Warehouse, late 1973	2:49

== Lineup ==
- Bobby Liebling – vocals
- Vince McAllister – guitar
- Greg Mayne – bass
- Geof O'Keefe – drums
- Randy Palmer – second guitar on "Livin' in a Ram's Head"
- Marty Iverson – second guitar on "Starlady" and "Much Too Young to Know"
