= A Keg Full of Dynamite =

Live album by Pentagram
- Released: 2003
- Recorded: The Keg; 1978
- Genre: Doom metal, heavy metal
- Label: Black Widow Records

Pentagram chronology
Turn to Stone (2002)	A Keg Full of Dynamite (2003)	Show 'Em How (2004)

A Keg Full of Dynamite is a live album by American doom metal band Pentagram, released by Black Widow Records in 2003. It was recorded at The Keg in 1978. Vocalist Bobby Liebling stated that this was the "first authorized representation of Pentagram during what has come to be known as the High Voltage Era". The final two tracks, "When the Screams Come" and "Livin' in a Ram's Head," were taken from the original test pressing 7" issued on High Voltage Records in 1979.

== Track listing ==
1. "Livin' in a Ram's Head" – 2:15
2. "Much Too Young to Know" – 3:02
3. "When the Screams Come" – 4:27
4. "Madman" – 4:11
5. "Mad Dog" – 2:37
6. "Review Your Choices" – 3:32
7. "Day of Reckoning" – 2:47
8. "20 Buck Spin" – 5:57
9. "Earth Flight" – 3:39
10. "When the Screams Come" – 4:14 (studio version)
11. "Livin' in a Ram's Head" – 2:55 (studio version)

== Lineup ==
- Bobby Liebling – vocals
- Paul Trowbridge – guitar
- Richard Kueht – guitar
- Martin Swaney – bass
- Joe Hasselvander – drums
