= Teutonic Witch =

Single by Reverend Bizarre

from the album III: So Long Suckers
- Released: 30 May 2007
- Recorded: Half of 2007
- Genre: Doom metal
- Length: 16:02
- Label: Spikefarm
- Producer(s): Reverend Bizarre

Reverend Bizarre singles chronology
"Slave of Satan" (2005)	"Teutonic Witch" (2007)

"Teutonic Witch" is a single by Finnish doom metal band Reverend Bizarre. It was released in May 2007. The song reached number one on the Finnish singles chart. It also appears in III: So Long Suckers combined with "They Used Dark Forces", from the same album.

== Track listing ==
No.	Title	Length
1.	"Teutonic Witch"	16:02
