= First Daze Here Too =

Compilation album by Pentagram
- Released: 2006
- Recorded: 1972–1976
- Genre: Doom metal, heavy metal
- Label: Relapse Records

Pentagram chronology
Show 'Em How (2004)	First Daze Here Too (2006)	Last Rites (2011)

Professional ratings
Review scores
Source	Rating
AllMusic	link

First Daze Here Too (2006) is the second of two compilation albums of 1970s Pentagram material, released by Relapse Records. It was preceded by First Daze Here (The Vintage Collection) (2001).

== Track listing ==
=== Disc 1 ===
1. "Wheel of Fortune"-4:03 (Bobby Liebling/Geof O'Keefe)
  - Recorded live in studio June 5 and 14, 1974 at National Sound Warehouse
2. "When the Screams Come"-2:47 (Liebling)
  - Recorded live in studio June 5 and 14, 1974 at National Sound Warehouse
3. "Under My Thumb"-3:17 (Mick Jagger/Keith Richards)
  - Recorded September 8, 1974 at Track Studios
4. "Smokescreen"-4:05 (Liebling/O'Keefe)
  - Recorded September 4, 12 and 23, 1976 at Underground Sound
5. "Teaser"-3:27 (O'Keefe)
  - Recorded September 4, 12 and 23, 1976 at Underground Sound
6. "Little Games"-2:57 (Harold Spiro/Phil Wainman)
  - Recorded September 4, 12 and 23, 1976 at Underground Sound
7. "Much Too Young to Know"-4:34 (Liebling/O'Keefe)
  - Recorded September 4, 12 and 23, 1976 at Underground Sound

=== Disc 2 ===
1. "Virgin Death"-1:42 (Liebling)
2. "Yes I Do"-2:14 (Liebling)
3. "Ask No More"-2:36 (Liebling)
4. "Man"-1:57 (O'Keefe)
5. "Be Forewarned"-3:59 (Liebling)
6. "Catwalk"-3:34 (Liebling)
7. "Die in Your Sleep"-1:39 (Liebling)
8. "Frustration"-2:03 (Liebling)
  - Recorded 1973 at American Mailing Warehouse
9. "Target"-7:26 (Liebling)
  - Recorded 1973 at American Mailing Warehouse
10. "Everything's Turning to Night"-2:29 (Liebling/O'Keefe)
  - Recorded 1973 at American Mailing Warehouse
11. "Take Me Away"-2:19 (O'Keefe)
12. "Nightmare Gown"-2:16 (Liebling)
13. "Cartwheel"-2:54 (Liebling)
14. "Cat & Mouse"-2:45 (O'Keefe)
15. "Show 'Em How"-10:02 (Liebling)

All tracks recorded 1972–1974 at the American Mailing Warehouse except where noted.

== Lineup ==
- Bobby Liebling – vocals
- Vincent McAllister – guitar
- Greg Mayne – bass
- Geof O'Keefe – drums
- Randy Palmer – guitar on "Wheel of Fortune", "When the Screams Come" and "Under My Thumb"
- Marty Iverson – guitar on "Smokescreen", "Teaser", "Much Too Young to Know" and "Little Games"
