= In the Rectory of the Bizarre Reverend =

Studio album by Reverend Bizarre
- Released: 24 November 2002
- Recorded: 18 March – 25 June 2001
- Studios: Red House (Turku, Finland)
- Genre: Doom metal
- Length: 74:09
- Label: Sinister Figure
- Producer: Reverend Bizarre

Reverend Bizarre chronology
In the Rectory of the Bizarre Reverend (2002)	Harbinger of Metal (2003)

Professional ratings
Review scores
Source	Rating
AllMusic	4.5/5 stars
Scream Magazine	4/6 stars

In the Rectory of the Bizarre Reverend is the debut album by Finnish doom metal band Reverend Bizarre. It was originally released in 2002 and was re-released with a bonus CD titled Return to the Rectory in 2004. The album was released on vinyl by Finnish label Svart Records.

The album title is a homage to King Crimson's 1969 album, In the Court of the Crimson King.

The album art is based on Goya's 1798 painting, Witches' Sabbath.

== Track listing ==
No.	Title	Lyrics	Music	Length
1.	"Burn in Hell!"	Witchfinder	Witchfinder	8:51
2.	"In the Rectory"	Witchfinder	Witchfinder	13:10
3.	"The Hour of Death"	Witchfinder	Witchfinder	11:46
4.	"Sodoma Sunrise"	Vicar	Vicar	13:29
5.	"Doomsower"	Witchfinder	Witchfinder	5:37
6.	"Cirith Ungol"	Witchfinder, Vicar	Witchfinder	21:09
Total length:				74:09

== Personnel ==
- Albert Witchfinder – bass, vocals
- Peter Vicar – guitar
- Earl of Void – guitar, drums
- Francisco Goya – cover painting: Witches' Sabbath

== Return to the Rectory ==
Return to the Rectory was planned to be released as an EP with the name "Reverend Bizarre Blesses You with Fire" by the Reverend Bizarre, but was featured as a bonus CD to the 2004 re-release of In the Rectory of the Bizarre Reverend. A standalone vinyl version was released in 2011.

"Aleister" is an extra track from the recordings of "Harbinger of Metal".

=== Track listing ===
1. "The March of the War Elephants" – 8:17
2. "The Festival" – 10:43
3. "The Goddess of Doom" – 12:11
4. "Aleister" – 11:58
5. "For You Who Walk in the Land of the Shadows" – 8:36
6. "Dark Sorceress (Autumn Siege)" (Barathrum cover) – 7:30
7. "The Wrath of the War Elephants" – 6:34

=== Personnel ===
- Albert Witchfinder – vocals, bass
- Peter Vicar – guitar
- Earl of Void – drums, guitar, keyboards
