= Imatran Voima (band) =

Finnish electro music duo

Imatran Voima is an electro music duo of Randy Barracuda (also known as Perttu Häkkinen, born 1979) and Fresh O. Lexxx (also known as Jaakko Kestilä), hailing from Helsinki, Finland. Their music is heavily influenced by Miami Bass, and they run their own record label Kostamus Records. Imatran Voima took their name from the Finnish electricity company of the same name (now part of Fortum). They have also covered songs by Iron Maiden and Finnish gothic rock band Two Witches.

Häkkinen died in 2018.

== Discography ==
=== Singles ===
- Super Breakout (12", Kostamus Records)
- Imatran Voima Presents Ghetto Bass Archives vol. 1 (8", Kostamus Records)
- In/Out (12", Tellektro)
- Techno Slut (12", Tellektro)
- Group Sex (12", Tellektro)
- Commando (12", Dominance Records)
- American Splendor EP (12", Golden Dice Records)

=== Albums ===
- The Church Of Latterday Maggots (2x12"/CD, Tellektro)
- Welfare State Of Mind (2x12"/CD, Mighty Robot Recordings)

=== Remixes ===
- "Pimeyden Jousi (Mr Velcro Fastener vs. Imatran Voima - Live At Kipsari)" on Pimeyden Jousi (Remixes) (12", Kostamus Records)
- "Jatkot" (East-Hellsinki Pilluralli mix)" on Notkea Rotta: Kaupungin Vauhdissa EP (12", Monsp Records)

=== Compilations ===
- "In/Out" on Fabric 08: Radioactive Man (CD, Fabric)
- "Aces High" on Powerslaves: An Elektro Tribute To Iron Maiden (CD, Angelmaker Records)
- "We Love Science" on Sound Of Suomi (2x12"/CD, Bunker Records)
