= Messa (band) =

Italian band

- Origin: Italy
- Genres: Doom metal
- Years active: 2014-present
- Labels: Metal Blade, Svart Records, Aural Music
- Members: Sara Bianchin; Alberto Piccolo; Mark Sade; Mystr
- Website: messaband.com

Messa is an Italian doom metal band formed in 2014. The word "Messa" means Mass in Italian. The band plays a unique style of doom metal that they have termed as "Scarlet doom".

== History ==
The band was formed in early 2014 by four friends in Cittadella, Italy. With Sara Bianchin on vocals, Marco Zanin on bass, Alberto Piccolo on guitars and Rocco Toldo on drums, the band independently released its first full-length studio album Belfry in 2016.

Their next studio album, Feast for Water was recorded and released in 2018 by Aural Music. The album was well received by critics, who praised their unique sound.

Following the release of their sophomore album, the band started to gain international attention. They began performing at renowned metal festivals like Hellfest and Roadburn, along with shows of their own.

In 2021, the band signed with Finnish record label Svart Records, and entered the studio to record their next album. Their third full-length record, Close was released in 2022 to critical acclaim. They also released a live album Live at Roadburn in the following year.

In 2024, the band signed with American independent heavy metal label Metal Blade. Their fourth studio album, The Spin was subsequently released in 2025. The album was very well received, and was included in several year-end critic lists, such as those published by Decibel, Metal Hammer and Metal Injection.

== Musical style ==
The band has described its music as "Scarlet doom" - an eclectic mix of sounds encompassing genres like traditional doom, jazz, psychedelic rock, drone and dark ambient.

Their unique sound can be primarily attributed to the diverse musical backgrounds of the members. According to an interview published in Veil of Sound magazine, the band described that each member had distinct musical backgrounds, and none of them had played doom before.

As such, the band is known for its experimentation with different sounds. For instance, their second studio album Feast for Water had noticeable jazz and drone influences.

Likewise, in their third studio album Close, the band used Mediterranean folk instruments. It also saw the inclusion of a grindcore track, thus presenting a diverse musical approach with traditional doom metal at its core.

The members have cited several bands like Black Sabbath, Led Zeppelin, The Devil's Blood, Cream, Darkthrone, Joe Henderson, and Bohren & der Club of Gore as major musical influences.

== Band members ==
- Sara Bianchin - vocals (2014–present)
- Alberto Piccolo - guitars (2014–present)
- Marco "Mark Sade" Zanin - bass/guitars (2014–present)
- Rocco "Mystr" Toldo - drums (2014–present)

== Discography ==
=== Studio albums ===
- Belfry (2016)
- Feast for Water (2018)
- Close (2022)
- The Spin (2025)
