= Harbinger of Metal =

EP by Reverend Bizarre
- Released: 2003
- Genre: Doom metal
- Length: 73:57
- Labels: Spinefarm Records; Svart Records

Reverend Bizarre chronology
In the Rectory of the Bizarre Reverend (2002)	Harbinger of Metal (2003)	Return to the Rectory (2004)

Professional ratings
Review scores
Source	Rating
Allmusic	3/5 stars
Scream Magazine	4/6 stars

Harbinger of Metal is a 74-minute EP by Finnish doom metal band Reverend Bizarre that was released in 2003. It was released on double vinyl in 2009 by Svart Records. Although considered an extended play by the band, the release is referred to as an album by some sources.

== Track listing ==
No.	Title	Length
1.	"Harbinger"	3:27
2.	"Strange Horizon"	13:51
3.	"The Ambassador"	1:47
4.	"From the Void"	20:18
5.	"The Wandering Jew"	18:27
6.	"Into the Realms of Magickal Entertainment"	3:38
7.	"Dunkelheit" (Burzum cover)	12:27
Total length:		73:57

== Personnel ==
- Albert Witchfinder – bass guitar and vocals
- Peter Vicar – guitar
- Earl of Void – guitar and drums
