= Reverend Bizarre =

Finnish doom metal band

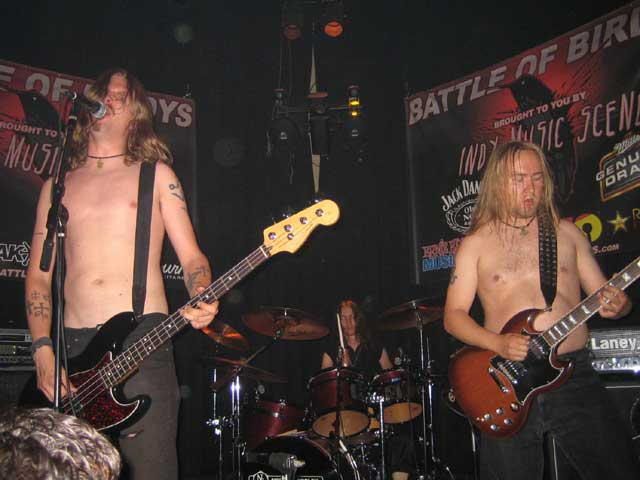
- Reverend Bizarre in 2005

Background information
- Origin: Lohja, Finland
- Genres: Doom metal
- Years active: 1995–2007
- Label: Spinefarm
- Past members: Albert Witchfinder; Peter Vicar; Earl of Void

Reverend Bizarre was a doom metal band from Finland. Formed in 1995, they played slow and heavy traditional doom with dramatic vocals, following in the footsteps of bands such as Witchfinder General, Saint Vitus, Candlemass, Pentagram and Black Sabbath. The band was one of the biggest names in 2000s traditional doom metal.

== History ==
=== Beginnings (1994–1999) ===
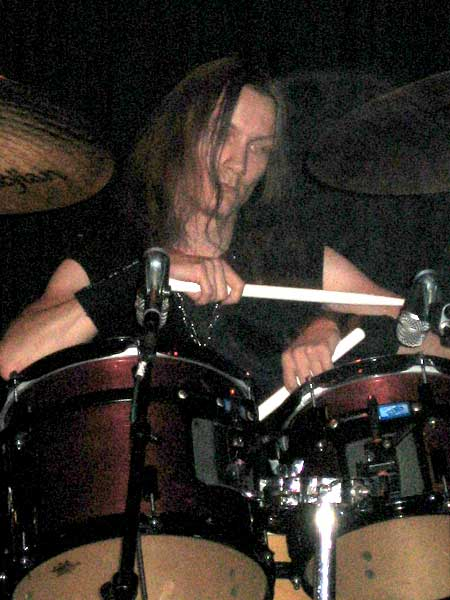
Earl of Void playing with Reverend Bizarre

The band was formed in 1994 in Lohja. After their military service, Albert Witchfinder, Peter Vicar and Juippi began playing in autumn 1997. In the summer of 1998, Albert moved to Turku to continue Reverend Bizarre with Vicar. To complete their training, they get back in touch with Earl of Void, at this time recently released from prison. They recorded the Slice of Doom demo in three days (16, 17 and 23 August 1999), which they send to several labels in the hope of signing a contract.

According to Albert Witchfinder, the band had planned three more full-length albums, after their second album – titled Songs from the Funereal World, Heavier Than Life and How It Was Meant to Be – but this plan was scrapped and the band made only one more LP, disbanding Reverend Bizarre "before it started to suck." The album, III So Long Suckers, was recorded in the first half of 2007, and released in August of that year. The band's last concerts were played during the autumn and winter of 2006 culminating in a final performance in Turku.

Two of the band's EPs, Harbinger of Metal and Return to the Rectory, actually exceed 60 minutes in length.

=== Disbandment and side projects (2007) ===
Initially, five albums were planned. On 17 August 2007, after scrapping this plan, the band announced on MySpace their intention to publish their final album III: So Long Suckers. At the end of September 2007, however, they announced the registration and publication of several recordings.

After the break-up of Reverend Bizarre, the band members focus on their other groups and projects. In 2005, Albert Witchfinder became a member of The Puritan as well as a solo project called Opium Warlords, and Peter Vicar founded a new band called Lord Vicar. Both of them released (alongside original material) songs originally meant for Reverend Bizarre and that were to appear on future two albums which were never released. Furthermore, all three members of Reverend Bizarre continue doing music together in Orne (originally known as Mesmer), Vicar's old school progressive rock band in which Void plays the drums. Witchfinder has appeared on vocals on both Orne full-lengths, the 2006 debut The Conjuration by the Fire and the 2011 second album The Tree of Life.

== Members ==
- Albert Witchfinder – vocals, bass
- Peter Vicar – guitar
- Earl of Void – drums, guitar, keyboards

Previous members

- Juippi – drums

== Discography ==
=== Studio albums ===
Year	Album details	Peak chart positions
Year	Album details	FIN
2002	In the Rectory of the Bizarre Reverend: Released: 24 November 2002; Label: Sinister Figure	—
2005	II: Crush the Insects: Released: 15 June 2005; Label: Spinefarm	36
2007	III: So Long Suckers: Released: 8 August 2007; Label: Spinefarm	6
"—" denotes a release that did not chart.

=== EPs and singles ===
Year	Album details	Peak chart positions
Year	Album details	FIN
2003	Harbinger of Metal: 1. "Harbinger" (3:27); 2. "Strange Horizon" (13:51); 3. "The Ambassador" (1:47); 4. "From the Void" (20:18); 5. "The Wandering Jew" (18:27); 6. "Into the Realms of Magickal Entertainment" (3:41); 7. "Dunkelheit" (Burzum cover) (12:26); Released: 2003; Label: Spinefarm	—
2004	Return to the Rectory Disc 1: 1. "The March of the War Elephants" (8:17); 2. "The Festival" (10:42); 3. "The Goddess of Doom" (12:10); Disc 2: 1. "Aleister" (11:58); 2. "For You Who Walk in the Land of Shadows" (8:35); 3. "Dark Sorceress (Autumn Siege)" (Barathrum cover) (7:29); 4. "The Wrath of the War Elephants" (6:38); Released: 2004; Label: Spinefarm	—
2005	Slave of Satan: Released: 20 April 2005; Label: Spinefarm	2
2006	Thulsa Doom: 1. "The Tree of Suffering" (6:41); 2. "The Children of Doom" (8:24); Released: May 2007; Label: Aftermath	—
2007	Teutonic Witch: Released: 30 May 2007; Label: Spinefarm	1
2008	Dark World/Deceiver: Released: 14 August 2008; Label: Primitive Reaction	—
2008	The Goddess of Doom: 1. "The Goddess of Doom" (12:10); 2. "Dunkelheit" (Burzum cover) (12:26); Released: 24 November 2008; Label: What	—
2009	Magick with Tears: Released: 2009; Label: Tyrannus	—
"—" denotes a release that did not chart.

=== Splits ===
Year	Album details	Peak chart positions
Year	Album details	FIN
2003	7-inch split with Ritual Steel: Released: 20 August 2003; Label: Metal Coven	—
2004	12-inch split with Orodruin: Released: 11 February 2004; Label: Hellride Music	—
2004	7-inch split with Minotauri: Released: 6 April 2004; Label: Metal Coven	—
2006	7-inch split with Mannhai: Released: 7 November 2006; Label: The Church Within	—
2008	7-inch/CD split with Kuolema: Released: 15 July 2008; Label: The Church Within	—
2008	12-inch split with Rättö ja Lehtisalo: Released: 30 July 2008; Label: Ektro	4
2008	12-inch split with Electric Wizard: Released: 5 September 2008; Label: Rise Above	8
2008	12-inch split with Mr Velcro Fastener: Released: 5 November 2008; Label: Solina	5
"—" denotes a release that did not chart.

=== Demos ===
- Practice Sessions (unpublished rehearsal tape, 1995)
- Slice of Doom (1999)
- You Shall Suffer! (extremely limited CDr, 2003)

=== Compilations ===
Year	Album details	Peak chart positions
Year	Album details	FIN
2004	Slice of Doom 1999–2002: Released: 2004; Label: psycheDOOMelic Records	—
2009	Death is Glory...Now: Released: 2009; Label: Spinefarm	23
"—" denotes a release that did not chart.
