= Reverend Bizarre/Mr Velcro Fastener =

Reverend Bizarre / Mr Velcro Fastener

EP by Reverend Bizarre and Mr Velcro Fastener
- Released: 5 November 2008
- Genre: Europop; doom metal
- Length: 29:48
- Label: Solina

Reverend Bizarre / Mr Velcro Fastener is a split EP by Finnish doom metal band Reverend Bizarre and electro music duo Mr Velcro Fastener, released in 2008 on the Solina label. In typical split-album fashion, Mr Velcro Fashioner covers a Reverend Bizarre song while Reverend Bizarre covers a song by Mr Velcro Fastener.

== Track listing ==
Side A (Mr Velcro Fastener)

No.	Title	Length
1.	"Doom Over the World" (Reverend Bizarre cover)	5:20
2.	"Bend" (originally from Otherside)	5:55
Total length:		11:15

Side B (Reverend Bizarre)

No.	Title	Length
3.	"Bend" (Mr Velcro Fastener cover)	10:31
4.	"Doom Over the World" (originally from II Crush the Insects)	8:02
Total length:		18:33
