= Review Your Choices =

Studio album by Pentagram
- Released: 1999
- Recorded: Sountrax Studios; August–December 1998
- Genre: Doom metal; heavy metal
- Length: 49:15
- Label: Black Widow
- Producer: Joe Hasselvander, Bobby Liebling, Mike Hounshell

Pentagram chronology
Human Hurricane (1998)	Review Your Choices (1999)	1972-1979 (Vol. 2) (1999)

Professional ratings
Review scores
Source	Rating
AllMusic	link

Review Your Choices is the fourth album by American doom metal band Pentagram. It was released in 1999 by Italian label Black Widow Records. Joe Hasselvander played all the instruments, while Bobby Liebling provided all lead and backing vocals. The spine reads "Twelve new Skeletons for your Closet of Dementia".

== Track listing ==
(Songwriters listed in brackets.)

1. "Burning Rays" (Bobby Liebling) – 2:36
2. "Change of Heart" (Joe Hasselvander/Liebling) – 5:28
3. "Living in a Ram's Head" (Liebling) – 2:35
4. "Gorgon's Slave" (Hasselvander/Liebling) – 6:34
5. "Review Your Choices" (Liebling) – 3:22
6. "The Diver" (Liebling) – 2:52
7. "The Bees" (Liebling) – 2:29
8. "I Am Vengeance" (Hasselvander/Liebling) – 5:25
9. "Forever My Queen" (Liebling) – 2:38
10. "Mow You Down" (Hasselvander/Liebling) – 3:22
11. "Downhill Slope" (Liebling) – 3:58
12. "Megalania" (Hasselvander/Liebling) – 7:02
13. "Gilla?" (Mike Hounshell) – 0:53

== Lineup ==
- Bobby Liebling – all lead and backing vocals
- Joe Hasselvander – all instruments
- Mike Hounshell – recording engineer
