= Mr Velcro Fastener =

Finnish electronic music duo

- Origin: Turku, Finland
- Genres: Electro; europop
- Years active: 1998–present
- Label: Stars-Music
- Members: Tatu Metsätähti; Tatu Peltonen
- Website: Official website

Mr Velcro Fastener (commonly mislabeled as Mr. Velcro Fastener) is a Finnish electronic music duo consisting of Tatu Metsätähti (born 1977, also known as Mesak) and Tatu Peltonen (born 1977), originating from Turku. They had first met at school, and started creating music together in early 1990s. They initiated their own studio called Miletos in 1997, the same year their project was named Mr Velcro Fastener. In 1998 they released their first EP, called Wad, on their own Tie Entertainment label. The record received excellent reviews around the world, and soon afterwards they released their second EP, Robots 4 Life.

German label i220 Music released their Tie Entertainers 12" and Mr Velcro Fastener's debut album Lucky Bastards Living Up North. Late 1999 Mr Velcro Fastener toured Central Europe, and in conjunction was released the EP Which Scenario?. In 2000 Electric Appliances Remixes were released and also one of their most successful 12"s, Who's Gonna Bend. Such British DJs as Pete Tong and Dave Clarke played Mr Velcro Fastener's tracks. Also, the Finnish doom metal band Reverend Bizarre recorded a cover of their song "Bend", which appears on a split EP they released together in 2008. In 2001 and 2002 were released the Otherside 12"s and also an album consisting of both these releases. 2003 saw the release of a retrospective album Thales of Miletos, featuring unpublished material recorded between 1993 and 1996. UK's Electrix Records released the 12"s Velcropopvichy (2003) and Gone Mad (2005). In 2005 was also published The Flock 12" on Stars-Music record label. In February 2006 was released the album Telemacho.

Mr Velcro Fastener have remixed such artists as Germany's Hardfloor and Finland's Giant Robot and Fu-Tourist. Recorded together with Imatran Voima, they released in 2003 a cover version of Finnish gothic rock band Two Witches' Pimeyden jousi.

== Discography ==
=== Albums ===
- Lucky Bastards Living Up North (1999, i220 Music)
- Otherside (2002, i220 Music)
- Thales of Miletos (2003, Zenit)
- Telemacho (2006, Stars-Music)

=== EPs and singles ===
- Wad EP (1998, Tie Entertainment)
- Robots 4 Life (1998, Tie Entertainment)
- Which Scenario? (1999, i220 Music)
- Electric Appliances Remixes (2000, i220 Music)
- Who's Gonna Bend (2000, i220 Music)
- Otherside Part One (2001, i220 Music)
- Otherside Part Two (2002, i220 Music)
- Velcropopvichy (2003, Electrix)
- Electric Appliances (2003, Air Recordings)
- The Flock (2005, Stars-Music)
- Gone Mad (2005, Electrix)
- Capek (2006, Stars-Music)
- Split With Reverend Bizarre (2008, Solina Records)
