= III: So Long Suckers =

Studio album by Reverend Bizarre
- Released: August 2007
- Recorded: 2007
- Genre: Doom metal
- Length: 130:00
- Label: Spinefarm Records

Reverend Bizarre chronology
II Crush the Insects (2005)	III: So Long Suckers (2007)	Electric Wizard/Reverend Bizarre (2008)

Professional ratings
Review scores
Source	Rating
AllMusic	3/5 stars

III: So Long Suckers is the third and final studio album by Finnish doom metal band Reverend Bizarre. It is a double album.

The duration on the first CD (66:06) is not coincidental. The first draft at mastering the CD was adjusted by a few seconds to produce the three 6's in the duration.

The lyric "Christs may come and Christs may go but Caesar is forever" is lifted from the pamphlet Might Is Right by Ragnar Redbeard.

The fifth track on CD 2 is a secret track not mentioned on the back cover of the CD case. It also goes under the nickname "Mallorca".

== Track listing ==
Disc 1
No.	Title	Writer(s)	Length
1.	"They Used Dark Forces / Teutonic Witch"	Witchfinder	29:05
2.	"Sorrow"	Witchfinder	25:20
3.	"Funeral Summer"	Witchfinder	11:41
Total length:			66:06

Disc 2
No.	Title	Writer(s)	Length
1.	"One Last Time"	Witchfinder	15:39
2.	"Kundalini Arisen"	Witchfinder	4:25
3.	"Caesar Forever"	Vicar	15:43
4.	"Anywhere Out of This World"	Witchfinder	25:32
5.	"Mallorca"		2:35
Total length:			63:54

== Credits ==
- Albert Witchfinder – bass, vocals
- Peter Vicar – guitar
- Earl of Void – guitar, drums
