= Reverend Bizarre/Orodruin Split =

Reverend Bizarre / Orodruin

EP by Reverend Bizarre and Orodruin
- Released: February 11, 2004
- Genre: Doom metal
- Length: 15:02
- Label: Metal Coven Records

Reverend Bizarre / Orodruin is a split EP by the bands Reverend Bizarre and Orodruin, released in 2004 on Metal Coven Records.

== Track listing ==
Side A

1. "Demons Annoying Me" - Reverend Bizarre - 15:03

Side B

1. "Ascending Damnation" - Orodruin - 6:11
2. "Master, the Tempest Is Raging" - Orodruin - 8:21
