= Last Days Here =

2011 American documentary film

- Directed by: Don Argott; Demian Fenton
- Produced by: Sheena M. Joyce
- Starring: Bobby Liebling; Sean Pelletier
- Cinematography: Don Argott; Demian Fenton
- Edited by: Demian Fenton
- Production company: 9.14 Pictures
- Distributed by: Sundance Selects
- Release dates: March 14, 2011 (SXSW); July 31, 2012 (commercial)
- Country: United States
- Language: English

Last Days Here is a 2011 American documentary film featuring Bobby Liebling, lead singer of doom metal band Pentagram. Directed by Don Argott and Demian Fenton, the film had its world premiere at the South by Southwest film festival on March 14, 2011. It is distributed by Sundance Selects.

== Synopsis ==
Last Days Here follows Bobby Liebling, lead singer of Pentagram, an Alexandria, Virginia-based doom metal band founded in 1971 and active sporadically throughout the following four decades. At the film's outset, Liebling is in his 50s, living in his parents' basement, and addicted to drugs. After Pentagram's music is rediscovered by the heavy metal underground scene, Liebling begins to recover from his lifestyle. His friend and manager Sean "Pellet" Pelletier attempts to help Liebling overcome his drug addiction and escape his old life. The film ends in 2010 with Pentagram returning to the stage and Liebling sober, married and his new wife expecting their first child.

== Production ==
Co-director Fenton first became familiar with Liebling after listening to Pentagram's 1970s recordings on cassette tape and the 2001 compilation First Daze Here, and enjoying the early Pentagram material. He heard rumors about Liebling, including living in his parents' basement and ingesting illegal drugs. When Fenton and Argott began filming Liebling, they were not sure if a documentary could result. Fenton said, "It really seemed like he was going to smoke himself to death in his parents' basement, something we weren't interested in documenting." When Liebling attempted to recover from his lifestyle, the directors saw potential for a documentary.

The directors filmed hundreds of hours of footage from 2006-2010 with very little budgeting. Fenton said about addressing the swift changes in Liebling's life, "Many times we had to finesse the rapid shifts in Bobby’s life so the viewer wouldn’t be left confused." He said that Liebling had shown multiple sides of himself, which the directors tried to balance for their documentary.

== Release ==
Last Days Here premiered at South by Southwest on March 14, 2011. In the following month, Sundance Selects acquired the rights to distribute Last Days Here in North America. It distributed the documentary in theaters and through its video on demand platform. It was released commercially on July 31, 2012 in DVD format.

== Reception ==
Stephen Saito of Independent Film Channel said Liebling's story was typical of most rock star stories and that he would normally not be interesting to mainstream viewers since Pentagram never had a mass audience. However, he said that "Fenton... and Argott spent six years waiting for the story to reveal itself and that patience has been rewarded with a tale that's sad, sometimes frustrating and ultimately triumphant." Saito applauded Fenton and Argott's use of supporting characters to share stories about Liebling. He noted, "Last Days Here isn't weighed down by history, or much of anything for that matter as it uses a traditionally straightforward, slightly shaggy narrative to tell of Liebling's rise and fall."
