= Pentagram (band) =

American heavy metal band

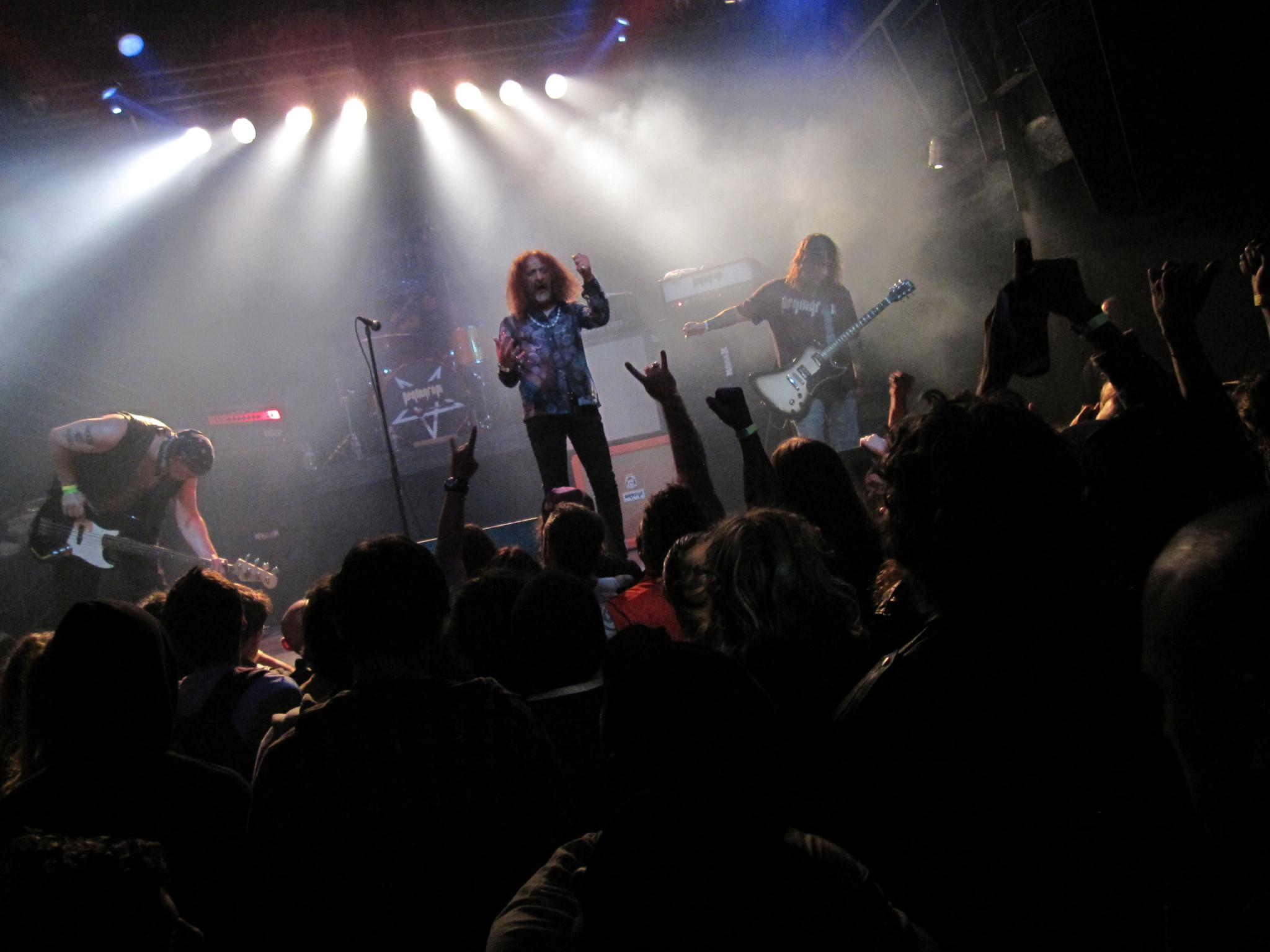
- Pentagram performing in 2009

Background information
- Origin: Alexandria, Virginia, U.S.
- Genres: Doom metal; heavy metal
- Years active: 1971–1977; 1978–1979; 1983–2005; 2008–present
- Labels: Metal Blade; Season of Mist; Peaceville; Black Widow; Relapse; Heavy Psych Sounds
- Spinoffs: Bedemon
- Members: Bobby Liebling; Tony Reed; Scooter Haslip; Henry Vasquez
- Website: pentagramusa.com
- Logo
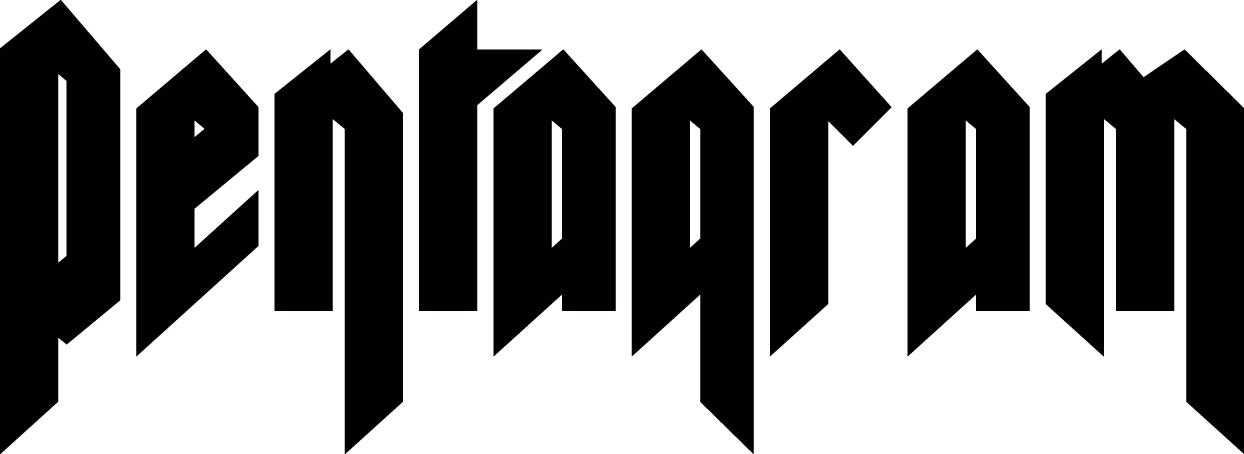

Pentagram is an American doom metal band from Alexandria, Virginia. They are noted as one of the pioneers of heavy metal, particularly of the aforementioned subgenre doom metal. As such, they are considered one of the "big four" of doom metal alongside Candlemass, Saint Vitus, and Trouble. The band's sound has drawn comparisons to Black Sabbath. Pentagram frontman Bobby Liebling has expressed distaste for the "doom metal" terminology, instead preferring Pentagram to be referred to as a "heavy hard rock" band.

While active in the underground music scene of the 1970s, Pentagram produced several demos and rehearsal tapes. However, their first full-length album, Relentless, was not released until 1985; it featured a new lineup, with the only original member being vocalist Bobby Liebling. The band has since released eight more studio albums. The current lineup of Pentagram consists of Liebling, Tony Reed (guitar), Scooter Haslip (bass), and Henry Vasquez (drums).

Lead vocalist Bobby Liebling has been referred to as "very much the US version of Ozzy Osbourne, but without the money or sustained success." Kiss reportedly attempted to purchase the rights for two songs from the band at some point in the 1970s.

== History ==
=== 1970s ===
In 1971, Bobby Liebling and Geof O'Keefe left their previous groups (Shades of Darkness and Space Meat, respectively) to form a new band that reflected their interest in the emerging genres of metal and heavy rock. Liebling suggested naming the group "Pentagram" to reflect the gloomy subject matter of their material. Although the band changed its name several times between 1972 and 1974 ("Macabre" in 1972, "Virgin Death" in 1973, and "Wicked Angel" in 1974 were all considered during this period), they eventually (and permanently) returned to Pentagram. Contrary to popular belief, Liebling gave Space Meat the name "Stone Bunny" when he briefly joined the band.

During their five-year career, they were represented by seven different managers, including Gordon Fletcher, a Washington, D.C. rock journalist, Steve Lorber, Phillip Knudsen, Skip Groff, Bob Fowler, Tim Kidwell, and Tom McGuire.

==== Early lineups, the Ram Family ====
The initial Pentagram lineup consisted of Liebling on vocals, O'Keefe on guitar, Vincent McAllister on bass, and Steve Martin on drums. Early practices included the long-time standard "Livin' in a Ram's Head" and other enduring Pentagram classics.

After a month of rehearsals, Space Meat alumnus John Jennings joined to create Pentagram's dual-guitar "Mark II" lineup, but he was soon asked to leave the group and his position was filled by guitarist O'Keefe. After this lineup's first rehearsal, Jennings called O'Keefe to tell him that he was leaving the group, citing a lack of interest in heavy music as his reason for departure. McAllister would become Pentagram's guitarist for the next five years. McAllister would leave for California in 1980 to attend classes at the Guitar Institute of Technology, and Jennings would subsequently collaborate with Mary Chapin Carpenter during the 1980s and into the 1990s as her primary guitarist.

On Christmas Day 1971, this Pentagram lineup began rehearsing, with Liebling on vocals, McAllister on guitar, Greg Mayne (formerly of Space Meat) on bass, and O'Keefe on drums. In mid-1974, rhythm guitarist Randy Palmer joined the "Ram Family", as the group was known, but left in January 1975 due to drug problems, and the group once again continued on as a quartet.

On April 29, 1975, Fletcher persuaded Sandy Pearlman and Murray Krugman (producer and manager of Blue Öyster Cult) to see them rehearse. The two arranged a demo session at Columbia Studios in New York City that September. Liebling and Krugman had conflicting opinions on a point of production. On December 16, 1975, Liebling and his girlfriend were arrested. The decision was made that the rest of the band would quit the group because Liebling owned the rights for the name "Pentagram", and they could not continue under that name without him. The remaining members unsuccessfully auditioned singers during much of 1976 before recruiting Marty Iverson as a second guitarist in the summer of 1976. After beginning a recording session at Underground Sound in Largo, Maryland, the band split from Liebling again, leaving the sessions unfinished.

Pentagram's first 7-inch, "Be Forewarned", was released under the name Macabre and included "Lazy Lady" on the B-side. The record was produced by Phillip Knudsen and released on Intermedia. This recording ended up being one of the band's only proper releases, although a promotional 7-inch of the song "Hurricane" was also released during that time. Pentagram's repertoire reportedly consisted of nearly 80 original songs, written or co-written by Liebling. Many of these demos would appear on the semi-authorized 1972–1979 compilation, the bootleg follow-up 1972–1979 (Vol. 2) and the hard-to-find (albeit official) Human Hurricane compilation. In 2001, Relapse Records issued an authorized compilation of 12 early tracks, three of which were live rehearsal recordings, titled First Daze Here (The Vintage Collection). Relapse later released First Daze Here Too in 2006, a two-disc, 22-track compilation of additional unreleased material.

==== High Voltage era ====
After O'Keefe, McAllister, and Mayne split from Liebling, a new lineup consisting of Liebling (vocals), Randy Palmer (guitar), and John Ossea (drums) began rehearsing in the basement of a dentist's office. Bass players during that period included Rick Marinari, who went on to join Albatross, and Vance Bockis, later of the Obsessed. However, this lineup broke up after a couple of months.

On Halloween 1978, the singer bumped into his friend Joe Hasselvander at the Louie's Rock City club in Falls Church, Virginia while seeing Sex, a band featuring ex-members of both Pentagram and the Boyz (Hasselvander's previous band). Hasselvander was playing in a group consisting of himself (drums), Richard Kueht (guitar), Paul Trowbridge (guitar), and Marty Swaney (bass). Personal problems caused this lineup to dissolve later in 1979. It is generally referred to as the "High Voltage era" of Pentagram.

=== 1980s and 1990s ===
==== Death Row, Victor Griffin era ====
In 1980, bassist Lee Abney and guitarist Victor Griffin formed a Knoxville, Tennessee, (later based in Northern Virginia) doom metal band named Death Row. Shortly thereafter, drummer Joe Hasselvander joined, and the group recruited Liebling on vocals. Former member Swaney soon replaced Abney on bass and the band re-assumed the name 'Pentagram'. Following two demos in 1982 and 1983, Hasselvander left the band in 1984 and Stuart Rose was chosen as his replacement. The 1982 demo, All Your Sins, was then remixed and partially re-recorded in 1984 for release in 1985 as the band's eponymous debut album.

In 1985, the band released their first studio album, featuring "Death Row" material and the lineup of Liebling on vocals, Griffin on guitar, Swaney on bass, and Rose on drums. Initially self-titled, the album was often referred to as Relentless due to it being renamed when it was reissued by Peaceville Records in 1993. The record's obscure lyrical themes helped Pentagram's reputation as a classic doom metal style band. After recording their second album, Day of Reckoning, the band folded. In 1989, 1970s-era members Mayne and Palmer rejoined Liebling with the addition of Ted Feldman on guitar and John Cook on drums. The band was working on recording a third LP, but shortly after their first performance in Maryland, they split up in 1990.

The previous "classic" lineup of Liebling, Griffin, Swaney, and Hasselvander reformed in 1993, and Peaceville Records reissued the first two albums. During this same time, Peace Records released the semi-legitimate 1972–1979. In 1994, they released their third full-length album, Be Forewarned. Griffin and Hasselvander briefly joined UK doom band Cathedral as live musicians in 1994. Bassist Greg Turley and drummer Gary Isom occasionally performed live with the band, filling in for Swaney and Hasselvander.

==== Liebling and Hasselvander ====
Pentagram split up again, and in 1996, a new lineup was forged, consisting of Liebling on vocals, Hasselvander on drums, and new members Greg Reeder on guitar and Ned Meloni on bass. This lineup recorded a demo, Change of Heart. Shortly afterward, Pentagram re-emerged as a studio duo, with Liebling retaining vocal duties and Hasselvander taking care of all instrumentation. In 1998, Downtime Records released a number of early recordings on a compilation album titled Human Hurricane; and 1972–1979 (Vol. 2), a bootleg follow-up to 1972–1979, was released in 1999 by Peace Records.

Liebling and Hasselvander recorded both 1999's Review Your Choices and 2001's Sub-Basement as a duo. In-between those albums, a brief live reunion of the Death Row classic lineup took place with Liebling, Griffin, Hasselvander, and Abney. The combo of Liebling and Hasselvander occasionally performed live as Pentagram during this period, assisted by bassist Walter White and drummer Dale Russell.

In 2001, Relapse Records issued First Daze Here (The Vintage Collection), a compilation consisting of unreleased material from the 1970s. In 2002, Peaceville Records released a compilation of songs from the first three albums titled Turn to Stone. Peaceville re-released the band's first three albums on CD in digipak format in 2005.

=== After 2000 ===
Shortly after Sub-Basement, Hasselvander split with Liebling, who soon recruited guitarist Kelly Carmichael, bassist Adam Heinzmann, and drummer Mike Smail, all members of the doom metal band Internal Void. This totally new lineup recorded Show 'Em How in 2004, an album that featured seven rerecorded 1970s-era Pentagram songs along with three new originals. In 2006, Relapse released a second compilation of unreleased 1970s material, First Daze Here Too. After Show 'Em How, Liebling collapsed in the intro of a show in Washington, D.C., Black Cat, forcing the band to recruit Hasselvander and others from the audience to perform in his stead.

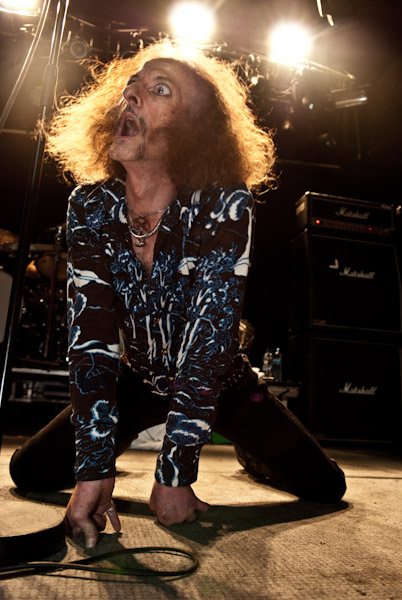
Lead singer Bobby Liebling performing live at Hole in the Sky 2009

In July 2000, former members Griffin and Abney formed Place of Skulls, following their departure from Pentagram. Place of Skulls briefly featured doom metal legend Scott "Wino" Weinrich on their 2003 With Vision album, though he later left to concentrate on the Hidden Hand. Abney left in 2002 but returned in 2007.

Palmer died in 2002 from injuries suffered in a car crash while McAllister died in May 2006 from cancer.

Hank Williams III included renditions of the classic versions of Pentagram's "Be Forewarned" and "Forever My Queen" in his live set. During his performance at the Black Cat club in 2006, Liebling joined Williams onstage and performed the songs himself. On September 15, 2006, Liebling joined Witchcraft onstage at a show at The Rock and Roll Hotel in Washington D.C., to sing Pentagram covers "When the Screams Come" and "Yes I Do".

Hasselvander's solo project, the Hounds of Hasselvander, released an album in 2007. For live performances, Hasselvander recruited Kayt Vigil on bass and former Pentagram drummer and Maryland doom mainstay Isom on drums. Hasselvander also contributed to Blue Cheer's 2007 album, What Doesn't Kill You. On August 23, 2008, a new Pentagram lineup was announced by Liebling, which featured guitarist Russ Strahan, former live drummer Gary Isom, and bassist Mark Ammen, who came in after a short period with Kayt Vigil.

In 2009, the band played two shows in New York City and Baltimore. The New York show was filmed for the documentary Last Days Here. The band later embarked on a seven-date mini-tour, which included two sold-out shows in Chicago plus dates in Seattle, Portland, Austin, San Francisco, and West Hollywood. On March 14, 2010, Strahan abruptly left the band one day before a spring tour was to begin. Liebling contacted Johnny "Wretched" Koutsioukis of Wretched fame to replace Strahan on lead guitar. He left after those gigs. For Pentagram's May 2010 tour dates (which concluded with Maryland Deathfest), Griffin once again joined Liebling, Turley, and Isom on what was intended to be solely for the tour. But he instead remained with the band for nearly three more years.

==== Last Days Here ====
Last Days Here is a documentary film featuring the daily drug-addled struggles of Bobby Liebling, the lead singer, songwriter, and co-founder of Pentagram. The documentary features interviews with prior members of the band as well as Liebling's parents and friends; the roles of his friend Sean "Pellet" Pelletier and his girlfriend Hallie, who became Liebling's wife; and the band's 2009 stage. The film was directed by Don Argott and Demian Fenton for 9.14 Pictures. Sundance Selects, a subsidiary of IFC Films, purchased the film with plans to release it theatrically in the winter of 2012.

In 2011, the documentary toured the film festival circuit, debuting at the SXSW Film Festival as well as playing at the Independent Film Festival of Boston, where it won the Grand Jury Prize. Other festival cities included Chicago; Sarasota, Florida; and Columbia, Missouri, as well as stops in Canada, Sweden, Denmark, and Australia. At the 2011 International Documentary Film Festival Amsterdam, it won the prize for Best Music Documentary.

==== New records and worldwide acknowledgment ====
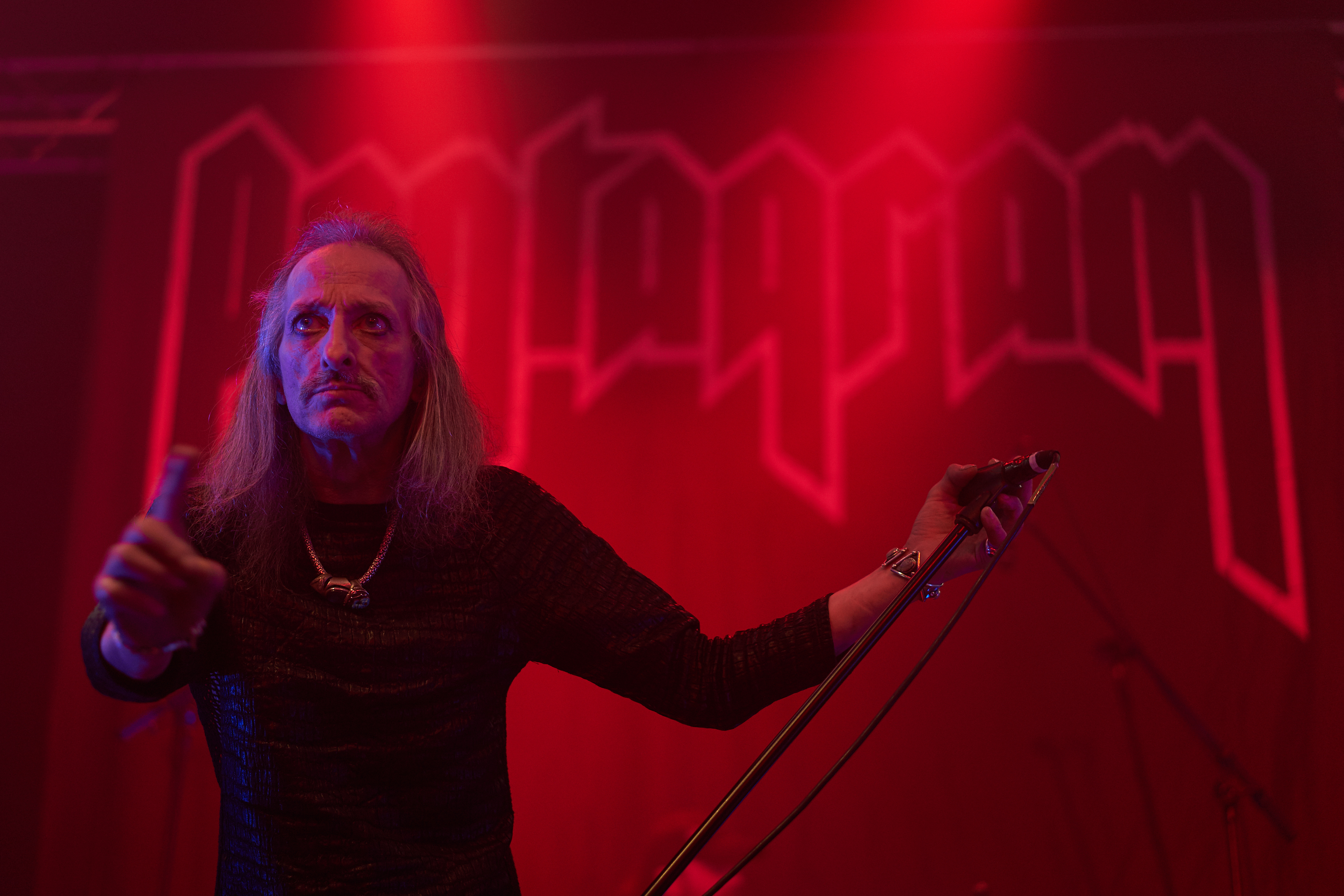
Bobby Liebling in 2015

In February 2011, Metal Blade Records announced that Pentagram would play South by Southwest in March 2011, followed by a European tour beginning on April 14, 2011, at the Roadburn Festival in the Netherlands. The lineup included Griffin on guitar, Turley on bass, and Albert Born on drums. Born soon left the group and was replaced by Tim Tomaselli (Place of Skulls).

Last Rites, released on April 12, 2011, featured the studio return of Griffin after more than 15 years. Turley and Tomaselli also played on the album. In June 2012, Pentagram announced that drummer Sean Saley had joined the band. At the end of that year, they announced an amicable split with Griffin. In April 2013, Pentagram unveiled the name of his successor: Matt Goldsborough, a member of the Philadelphia-based band the Great Unknown. Pentagram played several shows in the U.S. and toured Europe during 2012 and 2013, including dates in the UK, Germany, Norway, Switzerland, Sweden, Austria, France, Slovenia, Greece, Italy, and Spain.

In January 2014, the band announced that guitarist Griffin had re-joined Pentagram after a one-year break. Upon Griffin's return, Pentagram embarked on a U.S. West Coast tour in February 2014, covering Seattle, Portland, San Francisco, Las Vegas, Albuquerque, Denver, Salt Lake City, and Los Angeles. Pentagram also made appearances in Finland and Sweden in May 2014. In February 2015, new drummer Pete "Minnesota" Campbell, previously in Griffin's In-Graved, was announced, as was a new album titled Curious Volume, which was released on August 21.

==== Liebling's arrest, touring and brand new lineup ====
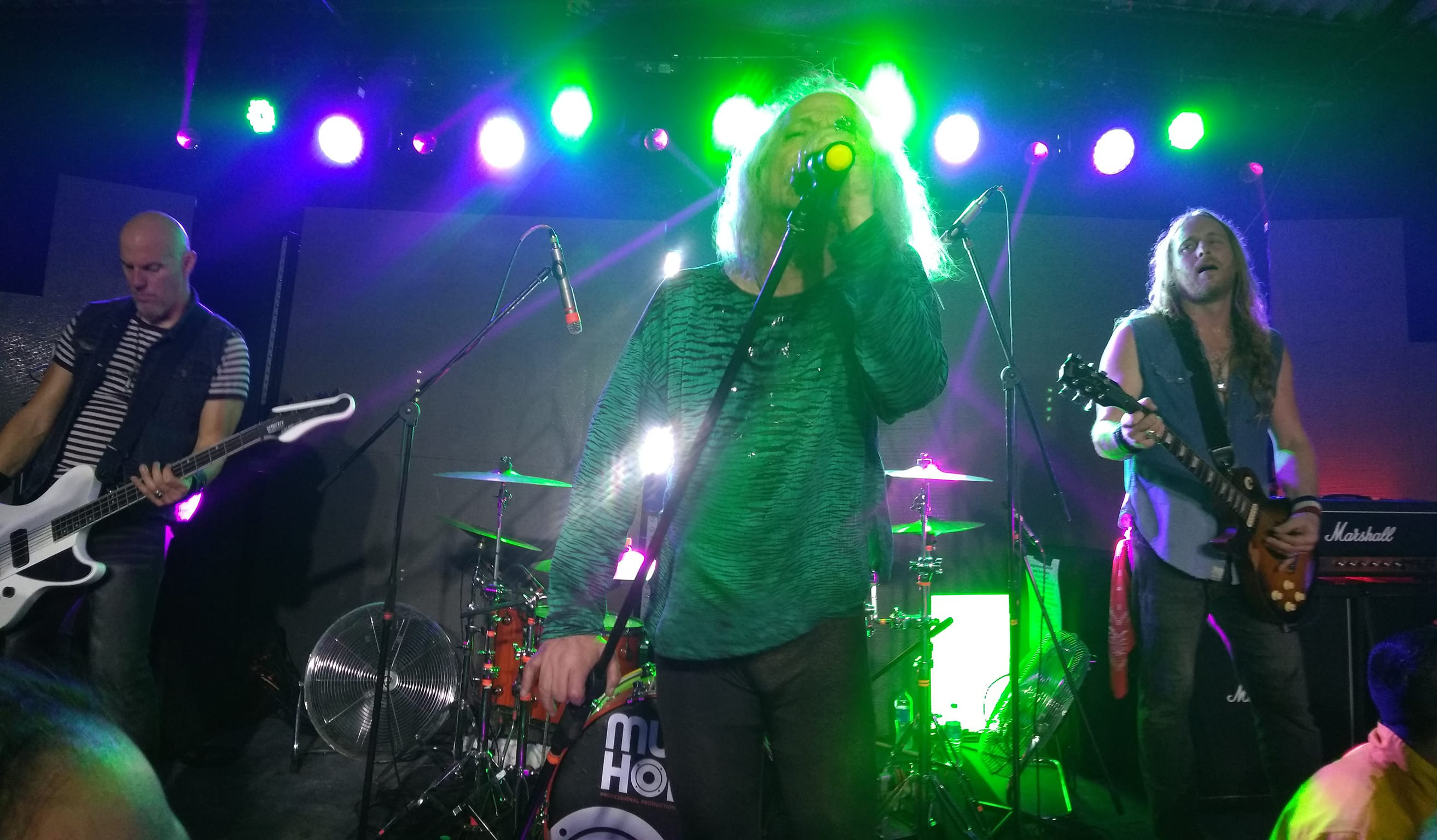
Pentagram performing in Colombia in 2022

In April 2017, the band announced that it would play several East Coast dates without Liebling, as a trio of Griffin (vocals), Turley, and Campbell. The singer was arrested and arraigned on charges of first-degree assault and vulnerable adult abuse with physical injury, with the victim believed to be his 87-year old mother. In October of that year, Liebling pleaded guilty to "abuse and neglect of a vulnerable adult custodian", and was sentenced to 18 months at the Montgomery County Detention Center.

Pentagram resurfaced in January 2019, announcing the return of vocalist Bobby Liebling, with guitarist Matt Goldsborough in place of Victor Griffin. They embarked on their first US tour with Liebling since his arrest in the spring of 2019, and plans for a new album by the band were announced. Griffin joined back in 2023. They played a gig at the Junkyard in Dortmund, Germany, only six days later. In 2024, Greg Turley announced his departure.

In June 2024 the new incarnation of the band was revealed; along with Liebling, were Tony Reed and Scooter Haslip (guitars and bass, respectively), and drummer Henry Vazquez (of Saint Vitus, the Skull, Spirit Caravan and Sourvein). This lineup recorded the band's first studio album in nearly ten years, Lightning in a Bottle, released on January 31, 2025.

In February 2025, a clip of Liebling went viral on TikTok, showing the singer staring off into the crowd with wide eyes during a live performance at a club in San Diego, California. Shortly after, a tour of Australia and New Zealand was announced for August that year, however the tour was cancelled on July 18 due to pressure from journalist Sherele Moody regarding Liebling's domestic violence conviction.

== Band members ==
=== Current members ===
- Bobby Liebling – vocals (1971–1977, 1978–1979, 1983–2005, 2008–2017, 2019–present)
- Tony Reed – guitar (2024–present)
- Scooter Haslip – bass (2024–present)
- Henry Vasquez – drums (2024–present)

=== Former members ===
Note: Several of the personnel listed were not permanent members of the band, with some having only played on a demo as session musicians, or having played either few or no live shows.

Guitarists

- Vincent McAllister (1971–1976, also bass 1971; died 2006)
- John Jennings (1971; died 2015)
- Randy Palmer (1974–1975, 1988–1989; died 2002)
- Marty Iverson (1976–1977)
- Richard Kueht (1978–1979)
- Paul Trowbridge (1978–1979)
- Norman Lawson (1978–1979)
- Victor Griffin (1983–1988, 1993–1996, 2010–2012, 2014–2019, 2023–2024; also vocals 2010–2012, 2014–2019, 2023–2024)
- Ted Feldman (1988–1989)
- Greg Reeder (1996)
- Kelly Carmichael (2003–2005)
- Russ Strahan (2008–2010)
- Johnny "Wretched" Koutsioukis (2010)
- Matt Goldsborough (2013–2014, 2015, 2019–2024)

Bassists

- Greg Mayne (1971–1976, 1988–1989; died 2021)
- Rick Marinari (1976–1977; died 2023)
- Martin Swaney (1978–1979, 1983–1988, 1993–1995)
- Vance Bockis (1979; died 2012)
- Greg Turley (1995–1996, 2010–2024)
- Ned Meloni (1996)
- Walter White (2001)
- Adam Heinzmann (2003–2005)
- Kayt Vigil (2008)
- Mark Ammen (2008–2010)

Drummers

- Geof O'Keefe (1971–1977; also guitar 1971)
- Steve Martin (1971)
- John Ossea (1977; died 1989)
- Joe Hasselvander (1978–1985, 1993–2002; also guitar and bass 1996–2002)
- Stuart Rose (1985–1988; died 2016)
- John Cook (1989)
- Gary Isom (1995–1996, 2008–2010)
- Dale Russell (2001)
- Mike Smail (2003–2005)
- Albert Born (2011)
- Tim Tomaselli (2010–2011)
- Sean Saley (2012–2015)
- "Minnesota" Pete Campbell (2015–2020, 2021–2024)
- Ryan Manning (2022, 2024)

== Discography ==
=== Studio albums ===
- Pentagram (1985, Pentagram Records), reissued as Relentless (1993, Peaceville Records)
- Day of Reckoning (1987, Napalm Records)
- Be Forewarned (1994, Peaceville Records)
- Review Your Choices (1999, Black Widow Records)
- Sub-Basement (2001, Black Widow Records)
- Show 'Em How (2004, Black Widow Records)
- Last Rites (2011, Metal Blade Records)
- Curious Volume (2015, Peaceville Records)
- Lightning in a Bottle (2025, Heavy Psych Sounds)

=== Singles and EPs ===
- "Be Forewarned" / "Lazy Lady" 7" as Macabre (1972, Intermedia Productions)
- "Hurricane" / "Earth Flight" 7" (1973, Boffo Socko)
- "Under My Thumb" / "When the Screams Come" 7" (1974, Gemini)
- "Just a Teaser" / "Just a Teaser" 7" (1976, Megatron records)
- "Livin' in a Ram's Head" / "When the Screams Come" 7" (1979, High Voltage Records)
- "Relentless" / "Day of Reckoning" 7" (1993, Peaceville Records)
- "Change of Heart" 12" EP (2012, Iron Pegasus Records)
- "Bang It Out (1971 Rehearsal)" flexi (2015, Decibel Flexi Series)
- "The Singles" 7" (2023, Creep Purple Records)

=== Live albums ===
- A Keg Full of Dynamite (2003, Black Widow Records)
- Live Rites (2011, Svart Records)

=== Compilation albums ===
- 1972–1979 (1993, Peace Records)
- Relentless/Day of Reckoning (1993, Peaceville Records)
- Human Hurricane (1998, Downtime Recordings)
- 1972–1979 (Vol. 2) (1999, Peace Records)
- First Daze Here (The Vintage Collection) (2001, Relapse Records)
- Turn to Stone (2002, Peaceville Records)
- First Daze Here Too (2006, Relapse Records)
- If the Winds Would Change (2011, High Roller Records)

=== Compilation appearances ===
- "Doctor Please" and "Feather from Your Tree" (Blue Cheer covers) on Blue Explosion: A Tribute to Blue Cheer (1999, Black Widow Records)
- "Dancing Madly Backwards (On a Sea of Air)" (Captain Beyond cover) on Thousand Days of Yesterdays: A Tribute to Captain Beyond (1999, Record Heaven Music)
- "Flaming" (Pink Floyd cover) on Like Black Holes in the Sky: A Tribute to Syd Barrett (2008, Dwell Records)
- "Little Games" (The Yardbirds cover) on Heavy Nuggets III (15 Gems from the Hard Rock Underground) (2014, Respect Music)
- "Tomorrow's Dream" (Black Sabbath cover) on Sweet Leaf: A Stoner Rock Salute to Black Sabbath (2015, Deadline Music)

=== DVDs ===
- When the Screams Come (2011, Metal Blade Records)
- Last Days Here (2011, MPI Media Group)
- All Your Sins (Video Vault) (2015, Peaceville Records)

== Bedemon ==
Bedemon was an offshoot of Pentagram, beginning circa 1973. The name was chosen as a portmanteau of two earlier suggested names, Demon and Behemoth. Prior to joining Pentagram, Randy Palmer and his friend Mike Matthews along with Bobby Liebling and Geof O'Keefe (then current members of Pentagram) got together to record some of Palmer's compositions. The first session resulted in three songs: "Child of Darkness", "Serpent Venom", and "Frozen Fear". After a short time, the group recorded additional tracks. When Palmer officially joined Pentagram, he brought two tracks with him: "Starlady" and "Touch the Sky". After Palmer's departure from Pentagram, Bedemon reformed in 1979 to record three more songs: "Time Bomb", "Nighttime Killer", and an unnamed composition by O'Keefe. A slightly different lineup (featuring former Pentagram member Greg Mayne on bass) recorded "Night of the Demon" along with some older songs in 1986.

On May 14, 2015, Bedemon announced their first live performance would take place on May 15 at the Psycho California Festival in Santa Ana, California, with a band lineup of O'Keefe on guitar, fellow ex-Pentagram member Greg Mayne on bass, drummer Frank Hayes, and Saint Vitus frontman Scott Weinrich on vocals.
