= Day of Reckoning (Pentagram album) =

Studio album by Pentagram
- Released: 1987
- Genre: Doom metal; heavy metal
- Length: 34:30
- Label: Napalm Records (original); Peaceville Records (reissue)

Pentagram chronology
Relentless (1985)	Day of Reckoning (1987)	1972–1979 (1993)

Remaster cover

Professional ratings
Review scores
Source	Rating
AllMusic	4.5/5 stars

Day of Reckoning is the second studio album by American doom metal band Pentagram. It was released in 1987 by Napalm Records. It was re-released by Peaceville Records in 1993, and in 1996 as part of a two-disc split CD with Relentless, and then again in 2005 as a digipak CD. Joe Hasselvander originally played drums on only one track, "Burning Savior", with Stuart Rose recording the drums on all the rest. Hasselvander re-recorded drums on all tracks (except "Burning Savior") for the 1993 Peaceville Records reissue. The original mixes with Rose on drums only appear on the Napalm Records vinyl version and an original cassette edition made in Canada, and have never appeared on CD.

== Track listing ==
(Songwriters listed in brackets.)

=== Original ===
1. "Day of Reckoning" (Bobby Liebling) - 2:43
2. "Broken Vows" (Griffin) - 4:38
3. "Madman" (Liebling) - 4:37
4. "When the Screams Come" (Liebling) - 3:42
5. "Burning Savior" (Griffin) - 9:08
6. "Evil Seed" (Griffin) - 4:17
7. "Wartime" (Griffin) - 5:25

=== Reissue ===
1. "Day of Reckoning" (Liebling) - 2:43
2. "Evil Seed" (Griffin) - 4:39
3. "Broken Vows" (Griffin) - 4:38
4. "When the Screams Come" (Liebling) - 3:43
5. "Burning Savior" (Griffin) - 9:08
6. "Madman" (Liebling) - 4:18
7. "Wartime" (Griffin) - 5:22

== Lineup ==
- Bobby Liebling – vocals
- Victor Griffin – guitar
- Martin Swaney – bass
- Joe Hasselvander – drums (on "Burning Savior" and all tracks on reissue)
- Stuart Rose – drums (on all tracks except "Burning Savior", not on reissue)
