= II Crush the Insects =

II: Crush the Insects

Studio album by Reverend Bizarre
- Released: 2005
- Genre: Doom metal
- Length: 73:20
- Label: Spinefarm Records
- Producer: Reverend Bizarre

Reverend Bizarre chronology
| Return to the Rectory (2004) | II: Crush the Insects (2005) | III: So Long Suckers (2007) |

Singles from II: Crush the Insects
- 1. "Slave of Satan" Released: 20 April 2005

Professional ratings
Review scores
| Source | Rating |
|---|---|
| Lords of Metal | (88/100) |
| AllMusic | 4/5 stars |

II: Crush the Insects is the second album by the Finnish doom metal band Reverend Bizarre, released in 2005. The song "Slave of Satan", which was released as a single on 20 April of that year, appears here in a 13:27 version, which is an abridgement compared to the full version of the song released as a CD single which clocked at 20:59. Due to the more upbeat nature of the first part of the album, the CD case has a sticker accusing Reverend Bizarre of being "The Biggest Sell-Out in True Doom".

== Track listing ==
| No. | Title | Writer(s) | Length |
|---|---|---|---|
| 1. | "Doom over the World" | Witchfinder | 7:37 |
| 2. | "The Devil Rides Out" | Witchfinder | 6:11 |
| 3. | "Cromwell" | Vicar | 5:25 |
| 4. | "Slave of Satan" | Witchfinder | 13:27 |
| 5. | "Council of Ten" | Vicar | 8:32 |
| 6. | "By This Axe I Rule!" | Witchfinder | 10:03 |
| 7. | "Eternal Forest" | Witchfinder | 10:53 |
| 8. | "Fucking Wizard" | Witchfinder | 11:15 |
| Total length: | | | 73:20 |

== Personnel ==
=== Reverend Bizarre ===
- Albert Witchfinder – bass and vocals, choir on track 1
- Peter Vicar – guitar, choir on track 1
- Earl of Void – guitar and drums, choir on track 1

=== Additional Personnel ===
- Anton "Satan's Claw" Q-Pias – guest guitar solos on the tracks "Fucking Wizard" and "By This Axe I Rule"
- Daniel Nyman: choir on track 1
