= First Daze Here (The Vintage Collection) =

Compilation album by Pentagram
- Released: 2001
- Recorded: 1972–1976
- Genre: Doom metal; heavy metal
- Label: Relapse Records

Pentagram chronology
1972–1979 (Vol. 2) (1999)	First Daze Here (The Vintage Collection) (2001)	Sub-Basement (2001)

Professional ratings
Review scores
Source	Rating
AllMusic	link

First Daze Here (The Vintage Collection) is the first of two compilation albums featuring 1970s material of American doom metal band Pentagram. It was released by Relapse Records in 2001 and was followed by First Daze Here Too in 2006. It marked the first time that these early Pentagram recordings were officially released with worldwide distribution. The vinyl version came with a bonus 7", a replica of the 1972 Macabre single containing the songs "Be Forewarned" and "Lazylady". Many of the songs were re-recorded for Pentagram's 1980s and 1990s albums. The 2016 CD reissue of the compilation added a second disc – the previously vinyl-only Macabre single replica, this time in compact disc form.

== Track listing ==
All tracks recorded March 22, 1973 at Bias Recording Studios unless noted.

No.	Title	Music	Length
1.	"Forever My Queen"	Liebling	2:25
2.	"When the Screams Come"	Liebling	2:59
3.	"Walk in the Blue Light"	Liebling	5:35
4.	"Starlady" (Recorded September 4, 12 and 23, 1976 at Underground Sound)	Randy Palmer, Liebling	5:15
5.	"Lazylady" (Recorded July 6, 1972 at The Fireplace)	Liebling, Geof O'Keefe	3:48
6.	"Review Your Choices"	Liebling	2:57
7.	"Hurricane" (Recorded June 13, 1973 at Bias Recording Studios)	Liebling	2:05
8.	"Livin' in a Ram's Head" (Recorded live June 5 and 14, 1974 at National Sound Warehouse)	Liebling	2:16
9.	"Earth Flight" (Recorded live June 5 and 14, 1974 at National Sound Warehouse)	Liebling, Greg Mayne	2:51
10.	"20 Buck Spin"	Liebling	4:57
11.	"Be Forewarned" (Recorded July 6, 1972 at The Fireplace; only on CD)	Liebling	3:27
12.	"Last Days Here" (Recorded live summer 1974 at the rehearsal warehouse)	O'Keefe, Liebling	6:08

The Macabre 7" - Original Mix (2016 reissue, disc 2)
No.	Title	Writer(s)	Length
1.	"Be Forewarned"	Liebling	3:37
2.	"Lazy Lady"	Liebling, O'Keefe	3:44

== Personnel ==
Pentagram

- Bobby Liebling – vocals, additional guitar on "Lazylady" and "Be Forewarned"
- Vincent McAllister – guitar
- Greg Mayne – bass
- Geof O'Keefe – drums
- Randy Palmer – rhythm guitar on "Livin' in a Ram's Head" and "Earth Flight"
- Marty Iverson – guitar on "Starlady"

Other

- Cameron Davidson – photography
