= Slave of Satan =

Single by Reverend Bizarre

from the album II: Crush the Insects
- Released: 20 April 2005
- Genre: Doom metal
- Length: 20:59 (single version); 13:26 (II: Crush the Insects version)
- Label: Spinefarm Records

"Slave of Satan" is a single by Finnish doom metal band Reverend Bizarre. It was released in April 2005. The sole track, "Slave of Satan" appears here unabridged (featuring an intro and outro with a "Recitation of the Black Liturgy" by Daniel Nyman of Oak) as it was later released in edited form (13:26) on the band's second LP. The single was edited to the exact length of 20:59 to fit the total length limitations set for the Finnish single charts. The release hit the Finnish single charts at number 2, staying on the charts for five weeks.

== Track listing ==
No.	Title	Length
1.	"Slave of Satan"	20:59
