= Relentless (Pentagram album) =

- Original album cover

Studio album by Pentagram
- Released: 1985 (Note: Originally released using Death Row band moniker under the album title All Your Sins as cassette only album release in 1982)
- Recorded: 1981–1982; 1984 (Note: Death Row All Your Sins 1982 cassette only album was remixed sometime in 1984 for Pentagram “Self Titled” vinyl LP February 1985 release date)
- Genres: Doom metal; heavy metal
- Length: 42:50
- Labels: Pentagram Records (original); Peaceville Records (reissue)
- Producers: Bobby Liebling, Victor Griffin, Tim Kidwell

Pentagram chronology
Relentless (1985)	Day of Reckoning (1987)

Relentless cover

Professional ratings
Review scores
Source	Rating
AllMusic	2.5/5 stars

Relentless is the debut studio album by American doom metal band Pentagram. It was self-released in 1985 as Pentagram, but was reissued by Peaceville Records in 1993 with the new title and reordered track listing. It was also issued as a two-disc split CD with Day of Reckoning in 1996 and then re-released again in 2005 as a digipak CD. The album is now commonly known as Relentless.

== Background and release ==
The album was originally recorded in 1981 and 1982 as two separate recording sessions and released in 1982 on the All Your Sins demo tape under the band name Death Row. The band, by then renamed Pentagram, decided to re-record some vocals and guitar parts in 1984 and created a complete new mix for their self-released debut album. The 1984 remix of the recordings appeared only on first-edition vinyl copies of the album (those with the purple logo on the cover) and that mix was never released on CD or later vinyl pressings. When Peaceville reissued the album on CD in 1993, they restored the original 1982 mix and track listing to save the original spirit and charm of the recordings. All CD and LP versions released since 1993 contain the original 1982 version.

== Music ==
Eduardio Rivadavia of AllMusic described the music on Relentless as "a raw, untainted slab of pure doom metal." The sound has drawn comparisons to Black Sabbath. Rivadavia said that guitarist Viktor Griffin "is an obvious disciple of Tony Iommi's fretwork."

Chris Chantler of Metal Hammer wrote: "When Bobby Leibling’s occult hellraisers released this full-length debut, 14 years into their slow-release career, their magisterial Virginian take on Sabbath’s downer fundamentals already sounded spookily out-of-time. Even more so when Peaceville reissued, renamed, repackaged and resequenced the album in 1993, ramping up the raw garage sound of Pentagram’s original tapes."

== Reception ==
Eduardio Rivadavia of AllMusic gave the album a score of two and a half stars out of five. He wrote: "Hardly a masterpiece, but well worth the wait, Relentless instantly confirmed Pentagram's position alongside Saint Vitus and Trouble in the American doom metal elite."

== Track listing ==
=== Original version (Pentagram) ===
No.	Title	Music	Length
1.	"Relentless"	Victor Griffin	3:49
2.	"Sign of the Wolf (Pentagram)"	Bobby Liebling	3:10
3.	"All Your Sins"	Griffin, Liebling	4:38
4.	"Run My Course"	Liebling	2:46
5.	"Death Row"	Griffin	4:14
6.	"Dying World"	Griffin	4:00
7.	"The Ghoul"	Joe Hasselvander, Liebling, Griffin	5:14
8.	"You're Lost I'm Free"	Liebling	2:17
9.	"The Deist"	Griffin	3:48
10.	"Sinister"	Griffin, Lee Abney	4:33
11.	"20 Buck Spin"	Liebling	4:20
Total length:			42:50

=== 1993 reissue (Relentless) ===
No.	Title	Music	Length
1.	"Death Row"	Griffin	4:14
2.	"All Your Sins"	Griffin, Liebling	4:38
3.	"Sign of the Wolf (Pentagram)"	Liebling	3:10
4.	"The Ghoul"	Hasselvander, Liebling, Griffin	5:14
5.	"Relentless"	Griffin	3:49
6.	"Run My Course"	Liebling	2:46
7.	"Sinister"	Griffin, Abney	4:33
8.	"The Deist"	Griffin	3:48
9.	"You're Lost I'm Free"	Liebling	2:17
10.	"Dying World"	Griffin	4:00
11.	"20 Buck Spin"	Liebling	4:20
Total length:			42:50

== Lineup ==
- Bobby Liebling – vocals
- Victor Griffin – guitar
- Martin Swaney – bass
- Joe Hasselvander – drums
