= Sarcofagus =

Finnish heavy metal band

Sarcofagus

Sarcofagus was one of the first heavy metal bands from Finland.

== History ==
Sarcofagus was founded in 1977. The band's frontman Kimmo Kuusniemi stated in the documentary film Promised Land of Heavy Metal that Finland in the early 1980s was not prepared for heavy metal. For the album Moottorilinnut, the band was forced to use the name Kimmo Kuusniemi Band, because they were not allowed to use the name Sarcofagus.

They broke up in 2020. Kimmo later started to work as a professional filmmaker. He has produced and directed hundreds of international films from TV commercials to music videos, from Vader to Madonna. He also composed movie soundtracks.

== Discography ==
- Cycle of Life (1980, JP-Music)
- Envoy of Death (1980, JP-Music)
- Moottorilinnut (1982, published as Kimmo Kuusniemi Band)
- Motorbirds Web Edition (2004, self-released)
- Core Values (2007, Rockadillo)
