= Be Forewarned =

Studio album by Pentagram
- Released: April 1994
- Recorded: January 1994
- Studio: Cue Recording Studio, Falls Church, Virginia
- Genre: Doom metal; sludge metal
- Length: 58:43
- Label: Peaceville
- Producer: Pentagram and Chris Murphy

Pentagram chronology
1972-1979 (1993)	Be Forewarned (1994)	Human Hurricane (1998)

Professional ratings
Review scores
Source	Rating
AllMusic	3/5 stars
Collector's Guide to Heavy Metal	8/10

Be Forewarned is the third studio album by American doom metal band Pentagram. It was released in 1994 by Peaceville Records. It was re-released in 2005 as a digipak CD and in 2010 as a double vinyl LP by Svart Records.

== Track listing ==
(Songwriters listed in brackets.)

1. "Live Free and Burn" (Victor Griffin, Joe Hasselvander) – 3:07
2. "Too Late" (Griffin) – 4:37
3. "Ask No More" (Bobby Liebling) – 4:06
4. "The World Will Love Again" (Hasselvander) – 5:13
5. "Vampyre Love" (Griffin) – 3:40
6. "Life Blood" (Griffin, Forrest) – 7:01
7. "Wolf's Blood" (Griffin) – 4:26
8. "Frustration" (Liebling) – 3:36
9. "Bride of Evil" (Hasselvander) – 4:34
10. "Nightmare Gown" (Liebling) – 2:53
11. "Petrified" (Liebling, Hasselvander) – 5:53
12. "A Timeless Heart" (Griffin) – 2:23
13. "Be Forewarned" (Liebling) – 7:14

== Personnel ==
Pentagram

- Bobby Liebling – vocals
- Victor Griffin – guitar, piano, backing vocals on "Life Blood"
- Martin Swaney – bass
- Joe Hasselvander – drums

Production

- Chris Murphy – producer, engineer
- Noel Summerville – mastering
