= Bobby Liebling =

American heavy metal singer (born 1953)

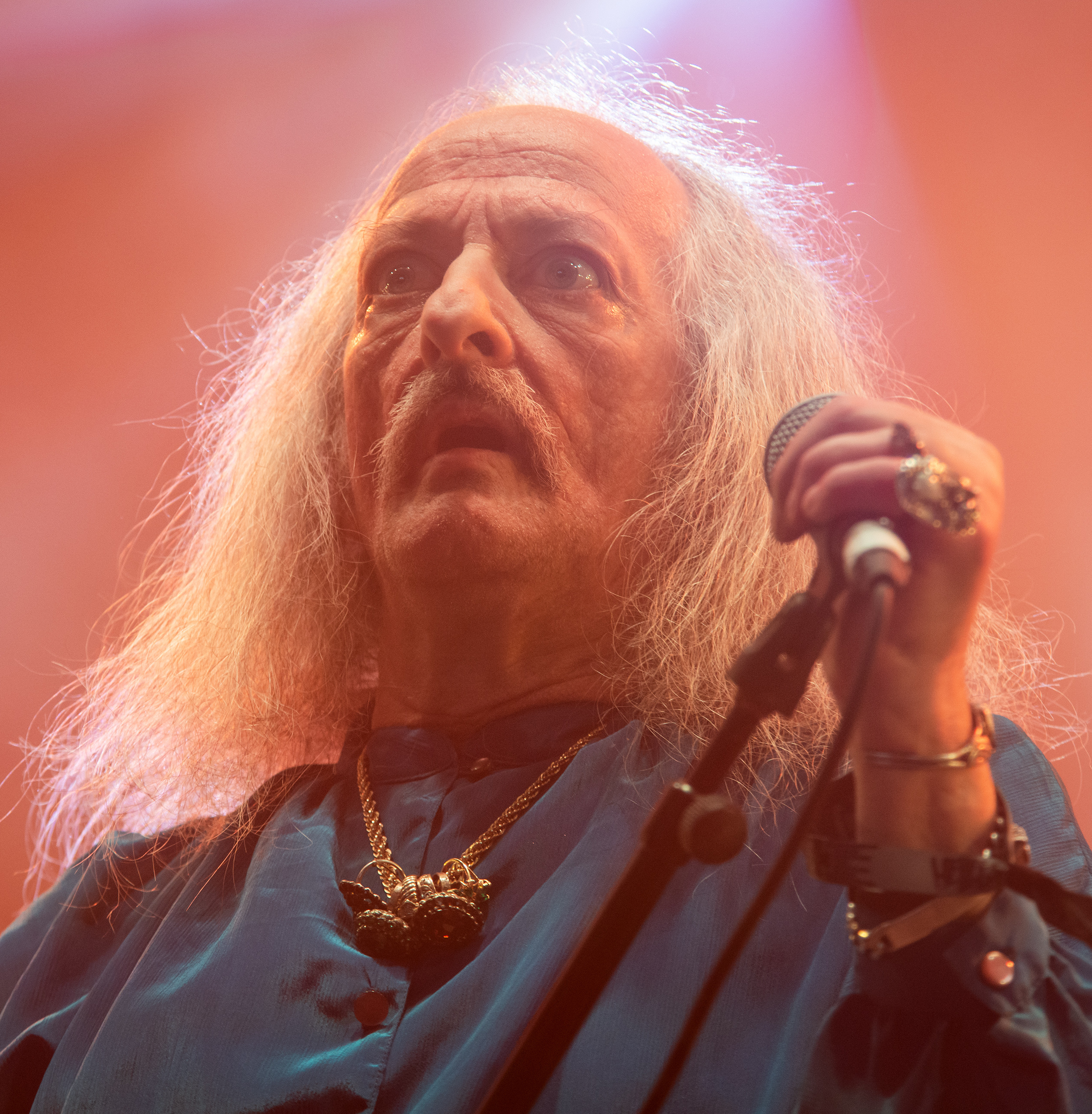
- Liebling with Pentagram in 2022

Background information
- Born: Robert Harold Liebling; December 21, 1953 (age 72); Brooklyn, New York City, U.S.
- Genres: Doom metal; heavy metal
- Occupations: Singer; songwriter
- Years active: 1965–present
- Member of: Pentagram
- Spouse: Hallie Liebling (m. 2009)
- Website: pentagramusa.com

Robert Harold "Bobby" Liebling (born December 21, 1953) is an American musician. He is the founder, lead vocalist, and only continuous member of the pioneering doom metal band Pentagram. He has been referred to as "very much the U.S. version of Ozzy Osbourne, but without the money or sustained success." His life and struggles with addiction were documented in Last Days Here (2011).

== Biography ==
=== Early life and musical beginnings ===
Bobby Liebling was the only child of Joseph Liebling, a high-ranking official in the U.S. Department of Defense under President Richard Nixon, and Diane, who had a background as a nightclub singer. He grew up in Washington, D.C., where his father worked as deputy assistant to the secretary of defense. Bobby was raised in a Jewish background. In the 2000s, he converted to Christianity, although, as of 2015, he considers himself spiritual rather than religious.

From an early age, Liebling showed a strong interest in music. He started his first band, Shades of Darkness, at 11 years old, performing at school dances. By his teenage years, he was heavily influenced by underground and proto-metal bands such as the Groundhogs, Sir Lord Baltimore, and Stray.

On December 25, 1971, Liebling co-founded the band Pentagram with former schoolmate Geof O'Keefe (drums), Vincent McAllister (guitar), and Greg Mayne (bass). He wrote his first songs in his room, playing on a $12 Silvertone guitar.

During his late teens, Liebling also began using drugs, including highly pure Cambodian heroin brought back by Vietnam War veterans. His struggles with addiction would later become a defining aspect of his life and career.

=== Early days of Pentagram ===
Though Pentagram struggled with lineup changes and financial issues, the band became a key influence in the development of doom metal, with Liebling's distinct vocals and songwriting playing a major role in their cult following. Their early recordings, particularly Relentless (1985) and Day of Reckoning (1987), laid the groundwork for future doom metal acts.

Despite their potential, Liebling's struggles with substance abuse, internal conflicts, and frequent lineup changes prevented Pentagram from achieving stability and mainstream success. By the mid-1970s, the band had caught the attention of influential managers and producers. One such figure was Gordon Fletcher, a columnist for Rolling Stone and Creem, who connected them with Sandy Pearlman and Murray Krugman, producers and managers of Blue Öyster Cult. Pentagram had an opportunity to record a full album, but the deal collapsed when Liebling, dissatisfied with the production of one of his tracks, had a heated argument with Krugman. As a result, Krugman walked out, canceling their contract.

Gene Simmons and Paul Stanley of Kiss were invited to a Pentagram rehearsal, with hopes of impressing them and securing their mentorship. However, guitarist Vince McAllister and bassist Greg Mayne, who at the time were janitors, arrived late, still in their dirty uniforms from work. The Kiss members mocked their appearance rather than taking the band seriously. Despite this, Paul Stanley offered to purchase some of their songs, but Liebling refused, wanting to keep control of his material.

In 1975, Liebling was arrested for drug possession, compounding their struggles to secure a record deal. By 1977, the original lineup had disbanded, leaving Liebling as the sole remaining member.

By the 1990s and early 2000s, Liebling had become increasingly reclusive, spending years isolated in his parents' basement while his physical and mental health deteriorated due to prolonged drug addiction. Despite his struggles, Pentagram continued to release albums and perform live with an ever-changing lineup.

=== Last Days Here ===
By the mid-2000s, Liebling had nearly disappeared from public life. He spent his days isolated in his parents' basement, trapped in a relentless cycle of addiction and self-destructive behavior. The toll of decades of substance abuse was evident in his skeletal frame, which was covered in sores and barely functioning, leading many to believe he was beyond redemption. This chapter of his life, which took an unexpected turn, became the subject of the documentary Last Days Here (2011), directed by Don Argott and Demian Fenton.

Filmed over four years, the documentary follows Liebling, who is in his 50s and living in the basement of his parents' house in Alexandria, Virginia, as he battles severe drug addiction.

His friend, manager, and longtime Pentagram fan Sean "Pellet" Pelletier took it upon himself to pull Liebling out of the abyss and get him back to music and a healthier life. Alongside Pelletier, the film features interviews with former Pentagram members, friends, Liebling's parents, and his then-girlfriend, Hallie. The documentary ends on a hopeful note; by 2010, Pentagram had returned to the stage, and Liebling was sober, married to Hallie, and expecting their first child.

When Argott and Fenton first met Liebling, they had little hope that his story would lead anywhere. "Bobby was in such bad shape when Pellet introduced us to him that we didn't think his story would go anywhere. It really seemed like he was going to smoke himself to death in his parents' basement, something we weren't interested in documenting," Fenton recalled. However, as Liebling began to make his first attempts at recovery, the filmmakers started to see potential in his journey.

Shaping Last Days Here into a coherent narrative proved to be a challenge. Liebling's personality was more erratic than the documentary ultimately portrayed. "Many times we had to finesse the rapid shifts in Bobby's life so the viewer wouldn't be left confused. Over the three years we were shooting, we saw the many different faces of Bobby Liebling. The delusional crack-smoking hustler, the arrogant '70s rock star, and the really cool loveable uncle. When boiling the footage down to 90 minutes, we really wanted to exemplify a balance of those personalities. That balance is sometimes tough to maintain," stated Fenton.

=== Revival and new music ===
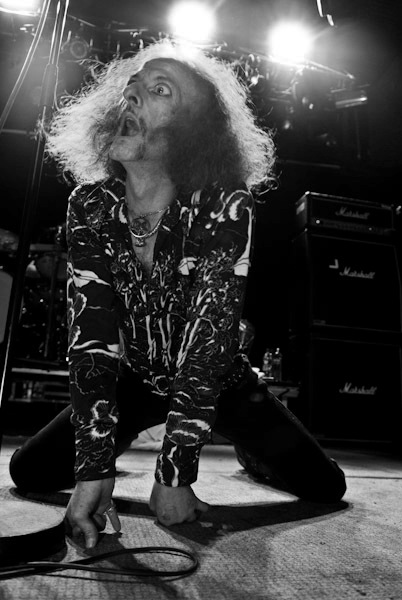
Liebling with Pentagram at Hole in the Sky 2009

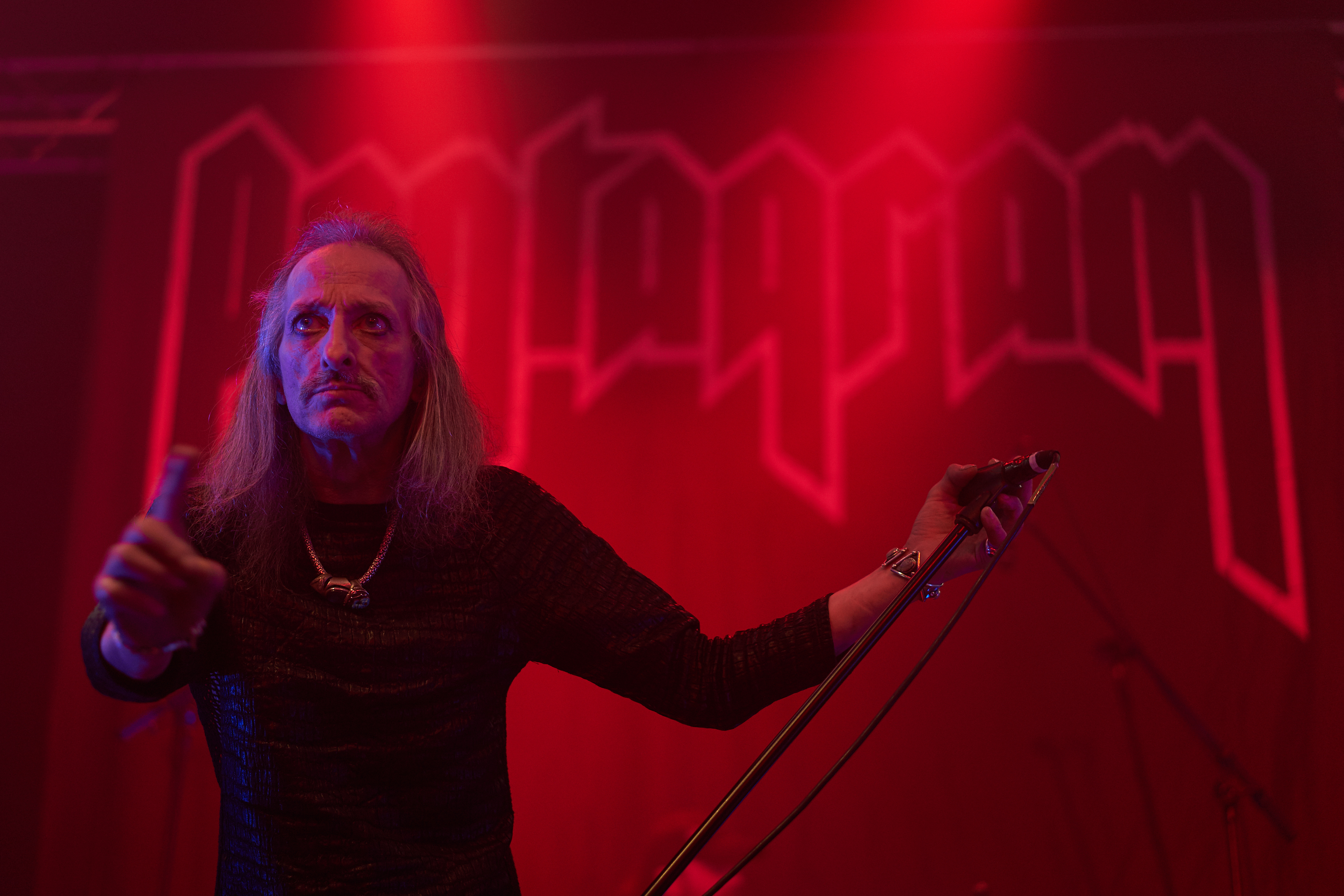
Liebling with Pentagram in 2015

Following the release and favorable reviews of Last Days Here, Liebling and Pentagram experienced a significant resurgence in popularity. The documentary won multiple awards, including the Grand Jury Prize at the Independent Film Festival of Boston and Best Music Documentary at the International Documentary Film Festival Amsterdam. This renewed attention revitalized Pentagram's career, leading to international tours.

Releasing a new album around the same time the documentary was published accelerated the band's resurgence. Liebling, alongside longtime collaborator Victor Griffin, returned to the studio for Last Rites, which was released in April 2011. This marked Griffin's first studio work with Pentagram in over 15 years.

At the time, Liebling noted that he had written the music and lyrics for about half of the band's earlier albums, "while 30–40% were collaborations with musicians, typically guitar players". Regarding his songwriting approach for the "Last Rites", he said: "I just write the lyrics nowadays. I ran out of music. I wrote 450 songs in 30 years."

In 2011, Metal Blade Records announced Pentagram's return to live performances, which included an appearance at South by Southwest and a European tour that began at the Roadburn Festival in the Netherlands. Liebling embarked on extensive touring across North America and Europe with Pentagram in the following years. However, the band continued to experience frequent lineup changes.

Pentagram maintained its momentum with the release of the album Curious Volume on August 21, 2015. While the band's live performances continued to receive praise, Liebling's erratic behavior behind the scenes presented ongoing challenges. More signs of instability resurfaced in the years leading up to his 2017 arrest.

On July 31 2026, He released song "Sidetracked" with The Limits band.

== Controversies and legal troubles ==
In June 2016, Bay Area bands Wax Idols and King Woman abruptly ended their tour with Pentagram, citing instances of harassment and unprofessional conduct. Hether Fortune of Wax Idols and Kristina Esfandiari of King Woman stated that they and their bandmates had been "treated really poorly & harassed in gross ways," leading them to withdraw from the tour. Pentagram's management labeled the situation as "unfounded and grossly opportunistic," claiming that after a few nights on tour, the bands "simply disappeared, posted negatively about us on social media, and then headed over to the show that was previously set up for them that very night."

In 2017, Liebling was arrested and charged with first-degree assault and physical abuse/injury of a vulnerable adult, later revealed to be his, at the time, 87-year-old mother Diane Liebling. He entered into a plea agreement, resulting in him pleading guilty to the abuse/neglect charge while maintaining his innocence regarding the first-degree assault charge. In October 2017, Liebling was sentenced to eighteen months in the Montgomery County Detention Center and three years of probation upon release.

During Liebling's incarceration, Pentagram continued their US tour and performed in Europe without him, with Victor Griffin taking over on vocals.

Previously, Liebling had been charged once for violating a restraining order and multiple times for drug possession. He has faced a total of "25 arrests, 35 detoxes, and more than 200 hospital visits."

A planned Australian and New Zealand Pentagram tour scheduled for August 2025 was cancelled upon local feminist groups learning about Liebling's conviction.

== Personal life ==
Liebling has made dubious claims that he turned to drug dealing during the 1970s, smuggling substances for the Medellin Cartel through Virginia and Colombia during the height of the Pablo Escobar era. He went as far as to claim he earned "tens of millions - sometimes in cash" during this period, but "blew it all, every dime of it on [his] own personal whoring, car-buying, house-buying for [his] friends, buying Ferraris and chinchilla coats and diamond rings for broads and flaunting it."

In the 1980s, Liebling was in a relationship with Cheri Blade, a member of the band Chained Lace, with whom Pentagram often toured.

He married Hallie Liebling on November 25, 2009. The couple welcomed their son, Robert Joseph Liebling, in 2010, when Hallie was 24 years old. They have been separated since around 2013.
