= Music to Raise the Dead 1972–1998 =

Music to Raise the Dead 1972-1998

Compilation album by Resurrection Band
- Released: July 2008
- Genre: Christian rock
- Label: Grrr

Resurrection Band chronology
Ampendectomy (1997)	Music to Raise the Dead 1972-1998 (2008)

Music to Raise the Dead 1972–1998 is the 19th release from American Christian rock band Resurrection Band, released in July 2008 through Grrr Records. The box-set includes three CDs with 52 digitally re-mastered songs, an 80-page full-color booklet detailing the history of Rez Band with scores of photos, and one DVD with over an hour of previously unreleased live concert video footage and special features.

== Track listing ==
=== Disc 1 ===
No.	Title	Original album	Length
1.	"Waves"	Awaiting Your Reply (1978)	3:39
2.	"Awaiting Your Reply"	Awaiting Your Reply	4:10
3.	"Broken Promises"	Awaiting Your Reply	6:57
4.	"Irish Garden"	Awaiting Your Reply	4:52
5.	"The Return"	Awaiting Your Reply	3:55
6.	"Afrikaans"	Rainbow's End (1979)	3:34
7.	"Paint a Picture"	Rainbow's End	4:50
8.	"Rainbow's End"	Rainbow's End	3:46
9.	"Concert for a Queen"	Rainbow's End	3:16
10.	"Everytime It Rains"	Rainbow's End	4:46
11.	"Colours"	Colours (1980)	4:58
12.	"Amazing"	Colours	2:22
13.	"American Dream"	Colours	3:22
14.	"The Struggle"	Colours	3:45
15.	"Alienated"	Mommy Don't Love Daddy Anymore	2:04
16.	"The Chair"	Mommy Don't Love Daddy Anymore	5:06
17.	"First Degree Apathy"	Mommy Don't Love Daddy Anymore	3:04
18.	"The Crossing"	Mommy Don't Love Daddy Anymore	3:48

=== Disc 2 ===
No.	Title	Original album	Length
1.	"Military Man"	D.M.Z. (1982)	3:40
2.	"Babylon"	D.M.Z.	2:35
3.	"Area 312"	D.M.Z.	3:44
4.	"No Alibi"	D.M.Z.	4:40
5.	"White Noise"	D.M.Z.	3:42
6.	"Attention"	Hostage (1984)	3:47
7.	"Crimes"	Hostage	3:41
8.	"Tears in the Rain"	Hostage	6:00
9.	"Love Comes Down"	Between Heaven 'n Hell (1985)	3:10
10.	"Zuid Afrikan"	Between Heaven 'n Hell	5:21
11.	"Shadows"	Between Heaven 'n Hell	5:01
12.	"Nervous World"	Between Heaven 'n Hell	4:24
13.	"Silence Screams"	Silence Screams (1988)	4:13
14.	"Light/Light"	Silence Screams	3:45
15.	"Rain Dance"	Silence Screams	5:05
16.	"Rooster Crow"	Innocent Blood (1989)	0:49
17.	"Altar of Pain"	Innocent Blood	3:18
18.	"Right on Time"	Innocent Blood	5:46

=== Disc 3 ===
No.	Title	Original album	Length
1.	"The House Is on Fire"	Innocent Blood	3:27
2.	"Where Roses Grow"	Innocent Blood	7:22
3.	"Lovespeak"	Civil Rites (1991)	3:28
4.	"Players"	Civil Rites	4:15
5.	"Lincoln's Train"	Civil Rites	4:41
6.	"Somebody to Love"	Civil Rites	3:01
7.	"Reach of Love"	Reach of Love (1993)	6:02
8.	"Land of Stolen Breath"	Reach of Love	4:06
9.	"Summerthrow"	Lament (1995)	4:14
10.	"Song and Dance"	Lament	4:50
11.	"Surprised"	Lament	5:26
12.	"Across These Fields Reprise"	Lament	3:44
13.	"Souls for Hire"	Ampendectomy (1997)	3:56
14.	"Gameroom"	Live Bootleg (1984)	4:26
15.	"Can't Stop Loving You"	Live Bootleg	3:51
16.	"Quite Enough"	Music to Raise the Dead (1974)	4:03

=== Disc 4 (DVD) ===
==== Live in Concert ====
- "Military Man"
- "Afrikaans"
- "Attention"
- "Colours"
- "Players"
- "The Struggle"
- "White Noise"
- "Alienated"
- "Paint a Picture"
- "Love Comes Down"
- "Lovespeak"
- "In Your Arms"
- "Shadows"
- "Where Roses Grow"
- "Light/Light"
- "I Will Do My Last Singing in This Land Somewhere"

==== Special Features ====
- "Crimes" (Music Video)
- "Love Comes Down" (Music Video)
- "Surprised" (Music Video)
- Band Commentary
