= Glenn Kaiser =

American musician & pastor (born 1953)

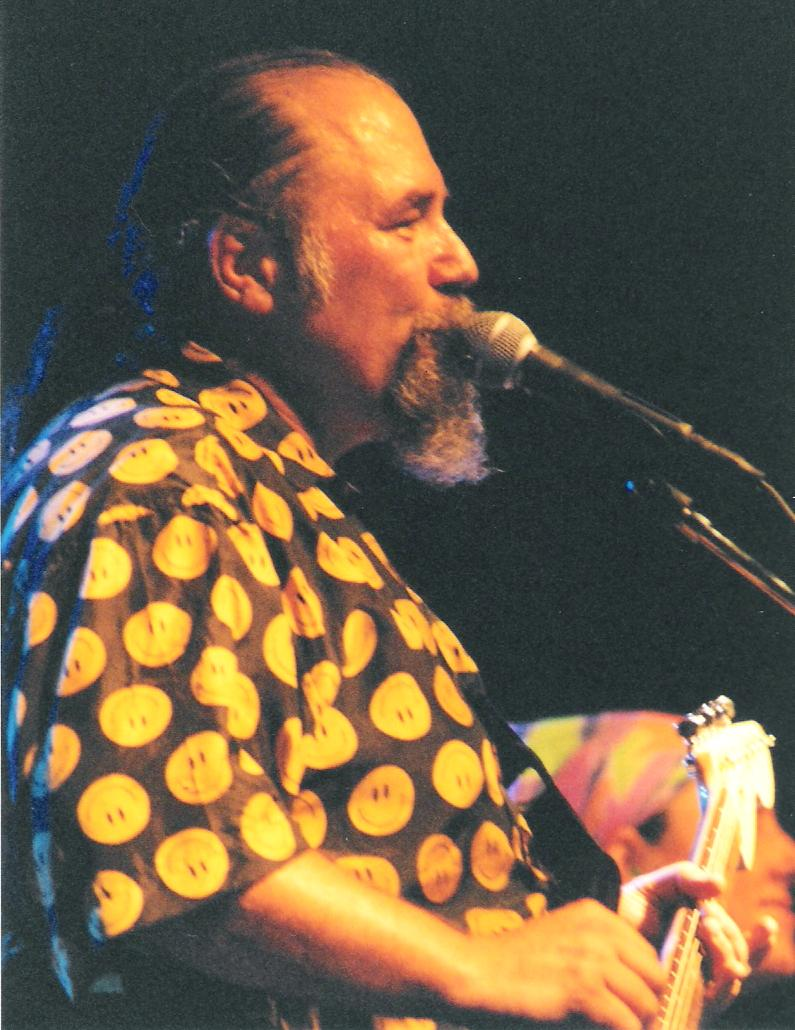
- Glenn Kaiser playing at Cornerstone Festival (2004)

Background information
- Born: January 21, 1953 (age 73); Milwaukee, Wisconsin, U.S.
- Genres: Contemporary Christian music, christian rock, Blues-rock, hard rock
- Occupations: Musician, pastor
- Instruments: Guitar, harmonica, lap steel guitar
- Years active: c. 1965–present
- Label: Grrr
- Website: gkaisersoze.wixsite.com/kaiz

Glenn Kaiser (born January 21, 1953) is an American, Chicago-based Christian rock, Christian blues musician, singer, songwriter and pastor. He was the leader of Resurrection Band and is currently the leader of The Glenn Kaiser Band.

== Personal life ==
=== Childhood ===
Kaiser's older brother and sister left the house while he was still young and his parents divorced when he was nine years old. Kaiser was active in Milwaukee's music scene, starting at the age of twelve, and was a member of more than twelve bands, leading two, before reaching nineteen years of age.

Glenn Kaiser was raised as a nominal Lutheran and used drugs before he became a born-again Christian, around the time of his eighteenth birthday. He was quoted as saying: "Nothing else gave me so much happiness or sense of purpose until I asked Jesus Christ to come into my heart and become absolute Lord of my life."

=== JPUSA ===
Kaiser joined and got involved in The USA Traveling Team of Jesus People Milwaukee (later renamed Jesus People USA ), where he met Wendi, his future wife. Wendi's brother, John Herrin, Jr., and Glenn later became members of the pastoral team before the age of twenty-five. JPUSA is the community that organized the Cornerstone Festival, at which Glenn Kaiser and Resurrection Band have played.

=== Later life ===
Glenn Kaiser married former Resurrection Band member Wendi Herrin (born April 8, 1953) in June 1972. Glenn and Wendi have one son, Aaron, and three daughters: Rebecca (husband Timothy), Heidi, and Ami. In 1994 Glenn Kaiser published a book, The Responsibility of the Christian Musician.

== Resurrection Band ==
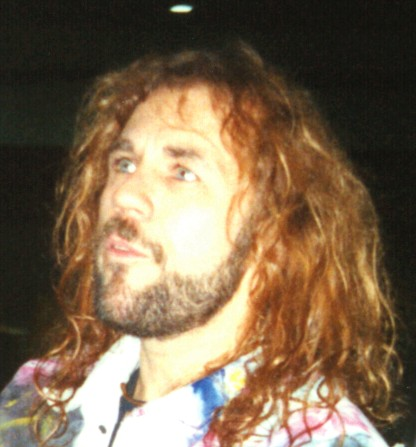

Glenn Kaiser's most successful and prominent band is Resurrection Band. Personnel included his wife Wendi, Wendi's brother John Herrin, Jim Denton, who was later replaced by Roy Montroy in 1987, and Stu Heiss. It began in mid-December 1971 as a band of the Jesus People of Milwaukee (part of The USA Traveling Team) and was first known as "Charity" (the King James Bible term for "love"). It was a traveling team and a mobile outreach of Jesus People of Milwaukee until the ministry disbanded in the summer of 1972. "Charity" changed its name to "Resurrection Band" around March 1972 and the band, as part of The USA Traveling Team left Milwaukee for the last time in early June 1972. They performed on the road for a few months, while loosely based in Florida, before calling Chicago home in early 1973 with Jesus People USA. They made several international tours to Australia, New Zealand, Europe, Germany, The Netherlands, France, Great Britain, Sweden, Finland and more. Though many considered it "the devil's music", Resurrection Band helped the movement of contemporary Christian music towards blues and rock music. It disbanded, after nearly 30 years, in 2000.

Although the band did break up in 2000, they have subsequently reunited for a few shows. Resurrection Band performed at Cornerstone Festival 2008 for the festival's 25th anniversary and also performed at the Chelsea House, a Chicago coffeehouse run by JPUSA. The key members of the band were the same at both shows, but Mike Choby (the bassist for Maron, another Jesus People USA band) filled in on keyboards.

== Discography ==
=== Resurrection Band ===
==== Independent cassettes ====
- All Your Life (1973)
- Music to Raise the Dead (1974)
- Demos (1976)

==== Studio albums ====
- Awaiting Your Reply (1978)
- Rainbow's End (1979)
- Colours (1980)
- Mommy Don't Love Daddy Anymore (1981)
- DMZ (1982)
- Hostage (1984)
- Between Heaven 'N Hell (1985)
- Silence Screams (1988)
- Innocent Blood (1989)
- Civil Rites (1991)
- Reach of Love (1993)
- Lament (1995)
- Ampendectomy (1997)

==== Live albums ====
- Live Bootleg (1984)
- XX Years Live (1992)

==== Compilation albums ====
- The Best of REZ: Music to Raise the Dead (1984)
- REZ: Compact Favorites (1988)
- The Light Years (1995)
- Music to Raise the Dead 1972-1998 (2008)

==== Solo albums ====
- All My Days (1993)
- Spontaneous Combustion (1994)
- Throw Down Your Crowns (1997)
- You Made The Difference in Me (1998, Review:
- Time Will Tell (1999, Review:
- Ripley County Blues (2002)
- No Greater Love (2002, as "Glenn Kaiser and Friends")
- Bound For Glory (2006)
- Cardboard Box (2011)
- Long Way From My Home (2016)
- Swamp Gas Messiahs (2020)

==== Compilation albums ====
- Blues Heaven: The Best of Glenn Kaiser's Blues (1999)
- Blues Heaven II: More of the Best of Glenn Kaiser's Blues (2006)

==== Collaboration albums ====
- Trimmed and Burnin' (1990, with Darrell Mansfield as Kaiser/Mansfield)
- Slow Burn (1993, as Kaiser/Mansfield)
- The Blues Night (1994, with Glenn Kaiser, Larry Howard, Trace Balin & Darrell Mansfield)
- Into the Night (1995, with Darrell Mansfield, Larry Howard & Glenn Kaiser as Mansfield/Howard/Kaiser)
- Trimmed and Burnin' & Slow Burn (2002, as Kaiser/Mansfield)
- Cornerstone Festival 2012 Live (2013, with Glenn Kaiser, Joe Filisko)

=== Glenn Kaiser Band ===
- Winter Sun (2000)
- Carolina Moon (2001)
- Blacktop (2003)
- GKB Live (2005)
- Octane (2008)
