= Jon Trott =

Jon Trott may refer to:

- Jonathan Trott, England cricketer
- Jon Trott, editor of the magazine Cornerstone
