= Platypus (band) =

American band

- Genres: Progressive rock, jazz rock
- Years active: 1997–2000
- Labels: InsideOut Music
- Spinoff of: Dream Theater
- Past members: Rod Morgenstein; Ty Tabor; John Myung; Derek Sherinian

Platypus was an American progressive rock supergroup, that consisted of members from Dream Theater, King's X and Dixie Dregs. The group was formed in 1997 and disbanded in 2000. Tabor, Myung and Morgenstein would continue working together as The Jelly Jam.

== History ==
Platypus was conceived by Dream Theater bassist John Myung and (then) Dream Theater keyboardist Derek Sherinian as a creative outlet where ideas that wouldn't fit in Dream Theater could be developed. Joined by guitarist Ty Tabor of King's X (who also sang lead vocals) and drummer Rod Morgenstein of Dixie Dregs, they released two albums between 1997 and 2000.

The sound of Platypus's music can be described as guitar and keyboard-driven modern progressive rock mixed with influences from the 70s rock and progressive rock scenes, employing vocal harmonies and lengthy instrumental pieces.

Their first album, When Pus Comes To Shove, did reasonably well, so much that it inspired the follow-up album Ice Cycles released in 2000. After this the band parted ways with no plans to re-form or record another album. The legacy of Platypus does live on though in the Jelly Jam — a project formed in 2000 consisting of three-quarters of Platypus (Myung, Morgenstein and Tabor). As of 2016 they have released four full-length albums.

== Discography ==
Title	Album details	Sales
When Pus Comes to Shove	Released: August 25, 1998; Label: Inside Out Music, SPV GmbH, King Records; Formats: CD	US: 7,129+
Ice Cycles	Released: March 14, 2000; Label: Inside Out Music, SPV GmbH; Formats: CD	

== Members ==
- John Myung - bass
- Derek Sherinian - keyboards
- Ty Tabor - guitars, vocals
- Rod Morgenstein - drums
