= Music to Raise the Dead =

Studio album by Resurrection Band
- Released: 1974
- Recorded: 1974
- Studio: Gary Rotta's basement, Chicago, Illinois
- Genre: Christian rock, Jesus music
- Label: Independent
- Producer: Resurrection Band

Resurrection Band chronology
All Your Life (1973)	Music to Raise the Dead (1974)	Demos (1976)

Music to Raise the Dead is the first independent cassette from American Christian rock band Resurrection Band, released in 1974. Although technically the band's first release, the album Awaiting Your Reply four years later is considered by most to be the band's official debut.

== Recording history ==
The cassette, featuring the kind of hard rock for which Resurrection Band would eventually become known, was recorded not long after the Jesus People USA community had moved from Minneapolis to Chicago, but before they found a permanent home in Uptown. The record was created in the basement of friend Gary Rotta entirely on headphones, so as not to wake Rotta's wife, who was asleep when the band recorded. However, the mixing board had been used many years previously to record one of Elvis Presley's number-one hits.

The tape was recorded in the same period than All Your Life, both of which were given away at their concerts. All your life was an independent set of acoustic numbers, a reflection of folk-oriented sets that were played at conservative venues, like nursing homes and churches, whose audiences would otherwise be unreceptive to the borderline heavy metal that Resurrection Band otherwise played and which were contained in the rock set Music To Raise the Dead. The cassette was re-released in a limited number of copies by the band's own label, Grrr Records, in 1992. It is considered a collector's item and is extremely hard to find.

The song "Quite Enough" was re-recorded in a live version on the 1984 album Live Bootleg.

== Track listing ==
Side one

1. "Down Baby" - 6:17
2. "I Can't Help Myself" - 4:17
3. "Crimson River" - 6:04
4. "There Will Be Fire" - 4:03

Side two

1. "We Can See" - 4:42
2. "Better Way" - 4:01
3. "Growin' Stronger" - 4:22
4. "The Man I Used to Be" - 5:25
5. "Quite Enough" - 5:58

== Band members ==
- Glenn Kaiser - Lead vocals, guitars
- Wendi Kaiser - Lead vocals
- Stu Heiss - Lead guitar, piano
- Jim Denton - Bass guitar, backing vocals, lead vocal on "Crimson River"
- John Herrin - drums
- Tom Cameron - Harmonica

== Production ==
- Producer - Resurrection Band
