= Resurrection Band =

American Christian rock band

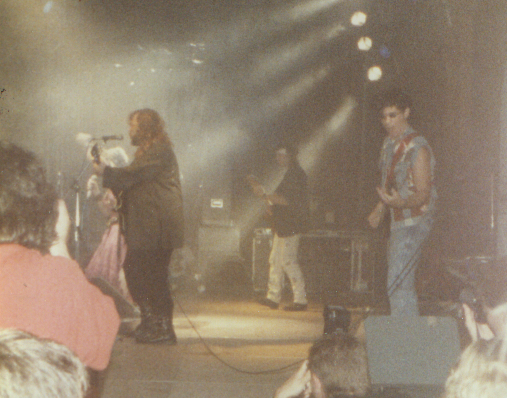
- Rez Band live in concert, August 1988

Background information
- Origin: Chicago, Illinois, US
- Genres: Christian rock, hard rock, blues rock, heavy metal, new wave
- Years active: 1972–2000, 2008, 2010
- Labels: Star Song, Light, Sparrow, Word, Ocean, Grrr, REX
- Members: Glenn Kaiser, Wendi Kaiser, Stu Heiss, Roy Montroy, John Herrin
- Past members: Jim Denton, Tom Cameron
- Website: www.resurrectionband.com

Resurrection Band, also known as Rez Band or REZ, was a Christian rock band formed in 1972. They were part of the Jesus People USA Christian community in Chicago, where most of its members remain today. Known for their blend of blues-rock and hard rock, Resurrection Band is credited as one of the forerunners of the Christian metal genre. Christianity Today called them "the most influential band in Christian music history." Following their debut in 1978, the band's greatest popularity was during the early 1980s, but later in the decade they found some crossover success when two of their music videos were featured on MTV.

Led by the husband-and-wife duo Glenn and Wendi Kaiser, the band sought to evangelize using Christian rock, and addressed a variety of social ills in the lyrics of their music. While the group is officially disbanded, they played several one-off dates at the now defunct Cornerstone Festival, which members of the band helped establish. Glenn Kaiser has an established solo career as a blues musician and is also a speaker on various spiritual issues to youth and adults.

== Band history ==
=== The 1970s: Breaking new ground ===
The band originally played together under the name "Charity" in 1972 with Jesus People Milwaukee, based in Milwaukee. When the community split into four groups, one became the "Jesus People USA Traveling Team", working primarily in Florida. Before their relocation to Chicago, the name "Resurrection Band" was chosen and the band became a primary focus of the community's ministry. After arriving in Chicago, the band recorded two independent cassettes that were given away after their concerts. The band performed anywhere they were allowed to play, from schools to prisons to street corners. The first cassette, Music to Raise the Dead, featured hard rock, while All Your Life comprised only their acoustic numbers. These were a reflection of the folk-oriented sets they would play at more conservative venues such as nursing homes and churches. The churches were deeply sceptical of Christian rock, especially the borderline heavy metal that Resurrection Band specialized in.

Four years later, thanks to an $8000 gift from a friend, Resurrection Band recorded their first album, Awaiting Your Reply, over a two-week period of marathon all-night sessions. Although the band had completed the album, including the cover art, no Christian record label would risk releasing it, as the Led Zeppelin/Jefferson Airplane inspired music was considered much too controversial for the Christian market at that time. Star Song Records were warned away from the project by other gospel music executives, but the tiny label had nothing to lose so they signed the band and released the record as it was. To everyone's surprise, Awaiting Your Reply hit big in the Christian market, and reached No. 6 on the Gospel album sales charts. Although misunderstood by many critics at the time, the album has been re-evaluated and highly praised in recent years and is listed at No. 91 in the book, CCM Presents: The 100 Greatest Albums in Christian Music, released in 2001.

The band followed up the success of that album with Rainbow's End, which continued in the same progressive hard rock/metal vein akin to Black Sabbath and Aerosmith. Although the band was pleased with the effort, Star Song was not, and the band was forced to find another label shortly after its release. Rainbow's End is significant for being the first album by an American rock band to address the racist system of apartheid in South Africa, a full year before Peter Gabriel brought the issue to the world's attention with his classic song "Biko." Resurrection Band would eventually become known for grappling with a variety of social and political ills in its music, from the evils of the military-industrial complex to the corrupting influence of American materialism, racism, homelessness, AIDS, drug addiction, prostitution and many other issues that the band personally confronted in its ministry to their surrounding urban community in Chicago.

=== 1980-1982: Acceptance and critical respect ===
Once signed by Light Records, Resurrection Band shed its progressive rock leanings and went for a more radio-friendly hard rock/metal sound. Both Colours, released in 1980, and Mommy Don't Love Daddy Anymore, released in 1981, were solid collections of music that alternately addressed larger social issues such as poverty and divorce as well as personal spiritual issues of salvation and discipleship, along with the intersection between the two. While the mainstream Christian press was still adapting to the idea of Christian hard rock, both albums were highly praised by alternative Christian music newspapers and their leading publication Harvest Rock Syndicate awarded both five stars. In addition, Resurrection Band began receiving greater airplay on radio stations that played Christian rock. Combined with their reputation as a powerful live act and effective evangelistic ministry (thanks to the fiery sermons preached at the end of Resurrection Band concerts by Glenn Kaiser), the band gained a positive reputation among church youth leaders as well as an enthusiastic and devoted fanbase. In spite of the increased attention, Resurrection Band funneled any and all profits back into the Jesus People USA community, as members held all monies in common according to the example set by the New Testament church.

In an attempt to be more efficient stewards of those monies, Resurrection Band built their own recording studio in the heart of their community, later nicknamed "Tone Zone." Although put together on a shoestring budget (with old mattresses on the walls in the studio's early incarnation), it was there that the band recorded its next album, D.M.Z., during the summer of 1982. A transitional work, the album was half Van Halen-inspired hard rock featuring blistering guitar solos from Stu Heiss, while the other half took a much more new wave-driven approach, a controversial musical direction the band would pursue with greater vigor on future releases. The split personality of the album was not well-received critically, although it generated two tracks that became live staples for years to come: "Military Man" and "White Noise."

To that end, those songs appeared again on the band's next release, Live Bootleg, a live album recorded before an enthusiastic local audience at the Odeum in Villa Park, IL in October 1983. This was the band's first release for Sparrow Records, one of the largest and most successful Christian record labels, which at that time was seeking to sign more Christian musical acts with ministry as their primary focus. Live Bootleg was the first album to be released under the band's shortened moniker "Rez Band," a colloquialism created by fans, and it also featured a number of songs that directly addressed issues of concern to high school-aged listeners. The latter focus would continue for as long as the band recorded music.

=== The mid-1980s: From New Wave to MTV ===
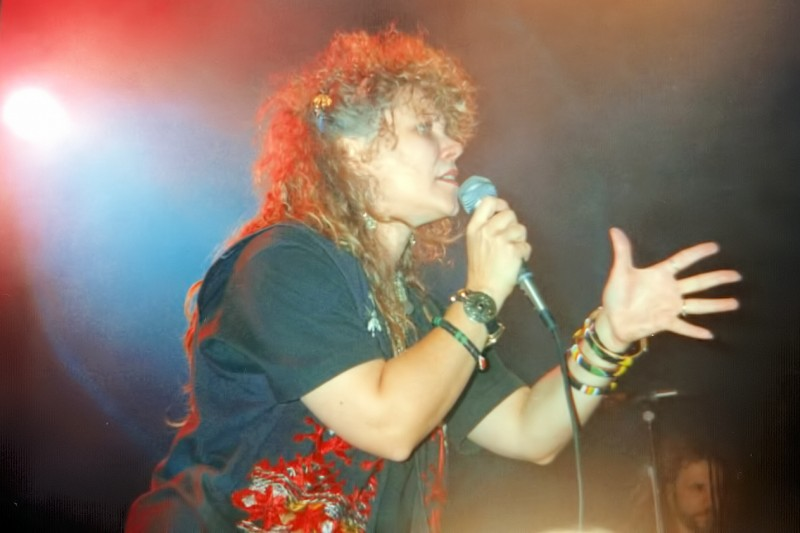
Wendi Kaiser, lead singer of Resurrection Band, with husband/guitarist/lead singer Glenn Kaiser in the background.

After a number of successful tours throughout the United States and Europe in the early 1980s with a variety of Christian hard rock acts—including a high-profile tour in 1982 with Swedish quartet Jerusalem—Rez Band was viewed by both fans and music critics as the preeminent Christian hard rock band. Capitalizing on the tour's success the live album Live Bootleg was recorded in the fall of 1983 and released in 1984 and is the band's biggest selling album and features a mixture of the band's most popular live tracks as well as two new hard driving songs: "Gameroom" and "Playground". As a result, when Rez Band released Hostage in late 1984, listeners were caught completely off guard. Moderately keyboard-driven, the album reflected the band's increasing interest in New Wave music with the first single "S.O.S." featuring almost no guitar whatsoever (although it does feature a Speak & Spell). "S.O.S." shot to the top of the Christian rock singles chart, staying there for several weeks and in doing so, the band attracted an entirely new audience. Still, the move was controversial and the critical reaction highly divided.

Rez Band had not completely abandoned its hard rock sound, though. The next single, "Crimes" - sung by co-lead singer Wendi Kaiser - is a traditional headbanging Rez Band number about inner-city violence, a topic that band members and the Jesus People USA community know first-hand. "Crimes" was even more popular on Christian radio, and received airplay on some mainstream rock stations as well, thanks to its music video, one of the first from the Contemporary Christian music industry to be broadcast on MTV.

That brief taste of mainstream success had a major influence on the band's next album, Between Heaven 'N Hell, which jettisoned most of the New Wave stylings of Hostage in favor of radio-friendly hard rock more akin to their Colours period. Shortening their moniker even further to "REZ," the band took advantage of the fact that Capitol Records now handled Sparrow's distribution. While the lyrics on the album represent a strong Christian worldview, explicit references to God or Jesus were almost non-existent. The catchy "Love Comes Down" was chosen as the band's first single and the music video - featuring much dance choreography - was a far more polished effort and as a result, received far more airplay on MTV than "Crimes". There was some controversy concerning this particular song as the guitar riff is almost exactly the same as AC/DC's "Whole Lotta Rosie." However, the band's most controversial decision was to eliminate the traditional altar call at the end of their concerts as a concession to playing more secular venues for the tour that supported this album, leading some to accuse the band of selling out their message for greater mainstream acceptance.

=== 1988-1993: Incorporating the blues ===
It would be three years before REZ returned to the studio to record their next album and much changed in the Contemporary Christian music industry during that time. REZ was no longer the dominant force in Christian rock; instead, Stryper had burst onto the scene in all their yellow-and-black glory, bringing Christian metal to the mainstream with To Hell with the Devil in 1986, which sold millions of albums and made the band a mainstay on MTV. Amy Grant had scored her first No. 1 US pop hit the same year with "The Next Time I Fall," a duet with former Chicago lead singer Peter Cetera. Even Christian alternative music had made inroads into the mainstream when The 77s signed with Island Records and their self-titled album received a favorable review in Rolling Stone. In addition, the Jesus People USA community established the annual Cornerstone Festival during this period, which would serve as a springboard to mainstream success for future Christian artists like Sixpence None the Richer and P.O.D.

Even the lineup of REZ changed during this time as well. Bassist Jim Denton left to attend theological seminary and was replaced by long-time REZ roadie and songwriter Roy Montroy, who would soon become a major creative force in the band.

Although REZ had been left out of the mainstream success, they were interested in using their music to speak plainly both to non-Christians about ideas of theology and to Christians about ideas of moral responsibility to those disenfranchised and suffering. These ideas are apparent in their 1988's Silence Screams, a hybrid of blues, hard rock and heavy metal that served as a musical blueprint for all of the band's successive releases. It dealt with social concerns such as abortion, greed, racial profiling and even terrorism. The album was the first to be released on the band's own record label, Grrr Records (a play on Myrrh Records, the most successful Contemporary Christian record label at that time.

Creatively invigorated, REZ released a new studio album every 18 months on average. Innocent Blood, Civil Rites and Reach of Love continued the formula first begun on Silence Screams. Each album dealt with current topics of social and spiritual concern, and each release contained more and more blues influence, thanks to lead singer Glenn Kaiser, who was beginning a new career as a blues artist outside of REZ. With Kaiser focusing more of his attention on his solo work, Roy Montroy became a greater contributor to REZ, and for Reach of Love, he wrote every single track, a feat never accomplished before by any member of the band. However, there was a growing sense - not just among music critics but also within the band itself - that the formula was growing stale and that REZ had fallen into a creative rut. As a result, for the first time in the band's history, REZ reached outside the Jesus People USA community for creative inspiration. It came in the form of Ty Tabor, guitarist and co-lead singer of King's X.

=== The late 1990s: Creative reinvention ===
The result of Ty Tabor's influence was Lament, released in 1995. Unlike any of the band's previous work, Lament is the band's first concept album, a song cycle about one man's disillusionment with the harshness and cruelty of life and his growing realization that things cannot change unless he experiences spiritual redemption. Recognizing the importance of how the songs are ordered, Resurrection Band (which had now reverted to its original moniker) played the entire album from beginning to end on the tour which supported this album. This was rare enough in rock music—save for The Who and Styx—but unheard of in Christian rock. As a result, the creative rebirth of Lament was highly praised among long-time fans of Resurrection Band as well as prominent Christian music critics.

Despite the praise the band received for Lament, Resurrection Band disbanded at the end of the tour, agreeing, however, to play an annual set at the Cornerstone Festival. In 1997, the band returned to the studio for another recording, Ampendectomy, featuring 15 selections from the band's history reinvented for acoustic instrumentation, as the MTV Unplugged craze was at its highest pitch. The album received mixed reviews.

=== 2000 and beyond ===
In July 2000, Resurrection Band brought almost 30 years of music and ministry to a close with a farewell performance, leaving behind them a transformed Christian music industry, and a platform upon which future Christian musicians could build.

In July 2008, the group reunited for the 25th anniversary of Cornerstone Festival. That same year, Grrr Records released Music to Raise the Dead 1972-1998; three CDs with 52 re-mastered songs, an 80-page full-color booklet detailing the history of Rez Band with scores of photos, and one DVD with over an hour of previously unreleased live concert video footage and special features.

In April 2010, the group reunited once again for the annual Easterfest Christian music festival in Toowoomba, Australia.

== Personnel ==
- Glenn Kaiser - vocals, guitar, dobro, dulcimer, keyboards, harmonica
- Wendi Kaiser - vocals
- Stu Heiss - lead guitar, keyboards
- Deland Pelto - bass guitar (1972–1974)
- Jim Denton - bass guitar, keyboards, acoustic guitar, vocals (1974–1987)
- Roy Montroy - bass guitar, keyboards, backing vocal (1987–2000)
- John Herrin - drums
- Tom Cameron - harmonica, snores (1972-79)

== Discography ==
=== Albums ===
All Your Life

- Released: 1973
- Format: Cassette
- Label: Independent
- Producer: Resurrection Band

Music to Raise the Dead

- Released: 1974
- Format: Cassette
- Label: Independent
- Producer: Resurrection Band

Demos

- Released: 1976
- Format: Cassette
- Label: Independent
- Producer: Resurrection Band

Awaiting Your Reply

- Released: 1978
- Format: LP/Cassette/8-track/CD re-issue
- Label: Star Song
- Producer: Resurrection Band

Rainbow's End

- Released: 1979
- Format: LP/Cassette/8-track/CD re-issue
- Label: Star Song
- Producer: Resurrection Band

Colours

- Released: 1980
- Format: LP/Cassette/CD re-issue
- Label: Light Records
- Producer: Resurrection Band

Mommy Don't Love Daddy Anymore

- Released: 1981
- Format: LP/Cassette/CD re-issue
- Label: Light Records
- Producer: Resurrection Band

D.M.Z.

- Released: 1982
- Format: LP/Cassette/CD re-issue
- Label: Light Records
- Producer: Resurrection Band

Live Bootleg

- Released: 1984
- Format: LP/Cassette/CD re-issue
- Label: Sparrow Records
- Producer: Resurrection Band

The Best of REZ: Music to Raise the Dead

- Released: 1984
- Format: LP/Cassette
- Label: Light Records
- Producer: Resurrection Band

Hostage

- Released: 1984
- Format: LP/Cassette/CD re-issue
- Label: Sparrow Records
- Producer: Resurrection Band

Between Heaven 'n Hell

- Released: 1985
- Format: LP/Cassette/CD re-issue
- Label: Sparrow Records
- Producer: Resurrection Band

Silence Screams

- Released: 1988
- Format: LP/Cassette/CD
- Label: Grrr Records
- Producer: Resurrection Band, Tom Cameron

REZ: Compact Favorites

- Released: 1988
- Format: CD only
- Label: Sparrow Records
- Producer: Resurrection Band

Innocent Blood

- Released: 1989
- Format: CD/Cassette
- Label: Grrr Records
- Producer: Resurrection Band, Tom Cameron

Civil Rites

- Released: 1991
- Format: CD/Cassette
- Label: Grrr Records
- Producer: Resurrection Band, Tom Cameron

XX Years Live

- Released: 1992
- Format: CD/Cassette
- Label: Grrr Records
- Producer: Resurrection Band, Tom Cameron

Reach of Love

- Released: 1993
- Format: CD/Cassette
- Label: Grrr Records
- Producer: Resurrection Band, Tom Cameron

The Light Years

- Released: 1995
- Format: CD/Cassette
- Label: Light Records
- Producer: Resurrection Band

Lament

- Released: 1995
- Format: CD/Cassette
- Label: Grrr Records
- Producer: Ty Tabor

Ampendectomy

- Released: 1997
- Format: CD/Cassette
- Label: Grrr Records
- Producer: Resurrection Band

Music to Raise the Dead 1972–1998 (Boxed set)

- Released: 2008
- Format: CD only
- Label: Grrr Records
- Producer: Resurrection Band

=== Charting singles ===
Year	Single	Peak Chart Positions			Album
Year	Single	US Christ CHR	US Christ Rock	US Christ Metal	Album
1983	"I Need Your Love"	—	2	—	D.M.Z.
1983	"No Alibi"	—	4	—	D.M.Z.
1983	"Military Man"	—	2	—	D.M.Z.
1983	"So in Love with You"	—	11	—	D.M.Z.
1984	"Game Room" (live)	—	8	–	Live Bootleg
1984	"Playground" (live)	—	6	—	Live Bootleg
1984	"Souls for Hire"	—	2	–	Hostage
1985	"Beyond the Gun"	—	13	–	Hostage
1985	"S.O.S."	14	1	–	Hostage
1986	"Love Comes Down"	—	1	–	Between Heaven 'n Hell
1986	"Shadows"	—	15	–	Between Heaven 'n Hell
1988	"Silence Screams"	—	3	–	Silence Screams
1988	"Rain Dance"	14	–	—	Silence Screams
1989	"You Get What You Choose"	—	2	–	Silence Screams
1989	"Light/Light"	–	7	—	Silence Screams
1989	"Waitin' on Sundown"	–	16	—	Silence Screams
1990	"Bargain"	—	1	-	Innocent Blood
1990	"Altar of Pain"	–	–	2	Innocent Blood
1990	"Laughing Man"	–	–	6	Innocent Blood
1990	"80,000 Underground"	–	8	14	Innocent Blood
1990	"Where the Roses Grow"	–	13	–	Innocent Blood
1991	"Lovespeak"	–	1	2	Civil Rites
1992	"Somebody to Love"	–	9	–	Civil Rites
1992	"Shadows" (live)	–	25	18	XX Years Live
1993	"Heart's Desire"	–	11	19	Reach of Love
1995	"In Charge"	–	6	–	Lament
1995	"Surprised"	—	4	–	Lament
1996	"Summerthrow"	—	1	–	Lament
1997	"Souls for Hire"	–	18	–	Ampendectomy
"—" denotes singles that did not chart.
