= All the Way Home =

All the Way Home may refer to:

- All the Way Home (play), a 1960 play by Tad Mosel adapted from the James Agee novel A Death in the Family
- All the Way Home (1963 film), a 1963 film adapted from Mosel's play and Agee's novel
- All the Way Home (1981 film), a TV adaptation of the play and novel, starring Sally Field and Ellen Corby
- All the Way Home (novel), a 2001 novel by Patricia Reilly Giff

== Music ==
- All the Way Home, a 2012 solo album by Cathy Jordan
- All The Way Home, a 1970 album by Randy & Gary Scruggs
- "All the Way Home" (Bruce Springsteen song)
- "All the Way Home" (Tamar Braxton song), 2013
- "All the Way Home", a song recorded by Frank Sinatra written by Teddy Randazzo
- "All the Way Home", a 1959 song by Andy Williams released on Andy Williams Sings Steve Allen
- "All the Way Home", a 1960 song by Bobby Darin released on For Teenagers Only
- "All the Way Home", a 1992 song by Spinal Tap released on Break Like the Wind
- "All the Way Home", a 1994 song by Third Matinee released on Meanwhile
- "All the Way Home", a 2000 song by Andrew Peterson released on Carried Along
- "All the Way Home", a 2000 song by Peter Mulvey released on The Trouble with Poets
- "All the Way Home", a 2004 song by Jerry Gaskill released on Come Somewhere
- "All the Way Home", a 2014 song by Melissa Etheridge released on This Is M.E.
