= John Todd (conspiracy theorist) =

American conspiracy theorist (1949–2007)

John Wayne Todd
- Portrait of John Todd
- Born: May 19, 1949
- Died: November 10, 2007 (aged 58); South Carolina, US
- Other names: John Todd Collins; Lance Collins; Kris Sarayn Kollyns; Christopher Kollyns
- Occupation: Public speaker
- Years active: 1968–1983
- Criminal charge: Rape
- Criminal penalty: 30 years imprisonment
- Criminal status: Convicted

John Wayne Todd (May 19, 1949 – November 10, 2007), also known as "John Todd Collins", "Lance Collins", "Kris Sarayn Kollyns", and "Christopher Kollyns", was an American speaker and conspiracy theorist. He claimed to be a former occultist who was born into a 'witchcraft family' before converting to Christianity. He was a primary source for many Chick Publications works against Dungeons & Dragons, Catholicism, Neopaganism, and Christian rock.

In his public appearances, Todd made a variety of claims about witches, Satanists, and the Illuminati, who he alleged were conspiring against Christians. These purported conspiracies often included government officials and leaders of Christian organizations. Investigative reports in magazines and books said there were many inconsistencies in his statements about anti-Christian conspiracies and his own past.

In 1988 Todd was convicted in South Carolina on charges of rape and sentenced to 30 years in a prison. In 2004 he was released from prison and placed in a psychiatric facility, where he died in 2007.

== Biography ==
=== Speaking career ===
Todd's earliest known public speaking engagements began in 1968, when he was preaching and married to a woman named Linda. He claimed he had been a witch while in the United States Navy, but converted to Christianity while visiting a southern Californian Pentecostal church. After disappearing from public sight for a few months, Todd returned without his wife, saying that God had told them to seek other mates. In 1969, Todd joined the United States Army and was stationed in Germany for a few months before being discharged for psychiatric reasons and drug abuse.

In 1972 Todd became associated with a Jesus Movement coffeehouse. In 1973, he appeared on a local Christian television show in Phoenix, Arizona, and was invited by evangelist Doug Clark to appear on his Amazing Prophecies show on the Faith Broadcasting Network. However, allegations surfaced that he had been making sexual advances toward young women and teenage girls at the coffeehouse, was incorporating witchcraft teachings into his Bible studies, carrying a .38 caliber handgun into church meetings, and using drugs. In addition, he impregnated his wife's teenage sister. Todd was dismissed from the coffeehouse ministry, and Clark denounced him on his television show.

In 1974 Todd moved to Dayton, Ohio with his wife Sheila, where he opened an occult bookstore and began recruiting for a Wiccan coven. In 1976 Todd became the subject of a criminal investigation over reports that he was involving underage girls in sexual initiation rituals for his coven. Following an investigation of his activities by neopagan leaders Isaac Bonewits and Gavin Frost, which uncovered drug use and underage sex, Frost's Church and School of Wicca revoked the charter it had granted to Todd's coven. He was convicted of contributing to the delinquency of a minor and given a six-month sentence, but served only two months before being released due to epileptic fits.

Todd resurfaced in the evangelical Christian community in late 1977, this time claiming the existence of a vast Satanic conspiracy led by an order of witches called the Illuminati, supposedly including a number of Christian organizations and well-known Christian figures such as Jim Bakker, Jerry Falwell, Billy Graham, Bob Jones, Sr., Oral Roberts, and Pat Robertson. He claimed to have given, as a member of the Illuminati, $8 million to Pastor Chuck Smith of Calvary Chapel to launch the Christian rock industry, which Todd said was a Satanic invention to entrap Christian young people in rock music and its "demonic beat". He claimed that Falwell had been bribed by the Illuminati with a $50 million donation. He also claimed that US President Jimmy Carter was the Antichrist and that Ayn Rand's 1957 novel Atlas Shrugged was the Illuminati's blueprint for unleashing a planned Satanic takeover. He urged Christians to stockpile weapons and food in preparation for a Satanic takeover in 1980.

A 1979 article from Cornerstone magazine indicates Todd was advocating Oneness Pentecostal (sometimes called "Jesus Only") theology at that time. Todd significantly curtailed his public speaking after 1979, reportedly moving to rural Montana after issuing warnings that the Satanic takeover had begun. He was later reported to have delivered a speech in Cedar Falls, Iowa in 1983 at the invitation of Randy Weaver.

=== Later life ===
Todd was arrested in May 1987 for the rape of a University of South Carolina graduate student. After his arrest, he was additionally charged with sexually molesting two children who attended a karate school where he worked. He was convicted of the rape in January 1988 and sentenced to 30 years in state prison. In June 1988, Todd, through his defense attorney, requested the return of a pair of pink women's panties, 64 photographs, two survival knives, a knife sharpener, a handgun, 99 cassette tapes and three copies of Todd's book How to Build an Ark: A Practical Guide to Survival.

In 2004, Todd was released, but he was put in the care of the Behavioral Disorder Treatment Unit run by the South Carolina Department of Mental Health.

== Claims and reactions ==
Todd claimed to have served as a Green Beret in the Vietnam War, but his discharge papers list him as a general clerk/typist for about 18 months and having no combat experience or deployment to Vietnam. Army medical reports referred to possible brain damage from childhood abuse, along with "emotional instability with pseudologia phantastica" (compulsive lying), difficulty in telling reality from fantasy, homicidal threats he had made on another, false suicide reports, and a severe personality disturbance. Todd also claimed in his testimony to have murdered an officer in Germany and to have escaped prison with the help of the Illuminati, but his records show no such things occurred. These records were later recovered by investigative journalists working for Christianity Today, who found that he had never been to Vietnam. One report concluded that Todd found it difficult to distinguish reality and fantasy. Todd also claimed that John F. Kennedy was still alive and that he had been Kennedy's "personal warlock".

While Todd claimed to have left witchcraft in 1972 and converted to fundamentalist Christianity, accounts have him being baptized into a Oneness Pentecostal church in Phoenix, Arizona in 1968, and leading a Wiccan group in Ohio in 1976. When confronted with the latter by Christian evangelists, Todd said that he had gone through a period of "backsliding" during that time. However, when a number of other inconsistencies in Todd's story were reported in the evangelical Christian media, and Todd began denouncing many Christian leaders as part of the Satanic conspiracy or the Illuminati, many evangelists denounced Todd and cut off any further association. Jack Chick was the only influential evangelist who continued to defend Todd.

Todd's speaking engagements during 1978 and 1979 generated controversy and sometimes hysteria at the churches in which he spoke. Frequently, there were claims by Todd of gunshots in the parking lot or attacks on his life after the services, but there were no witnesses to confirm his claims. Several Christian organizations and publications investigated Todd's claims and published articles disputing them. These included Cornerstone magazine, the Christian Research Institute, Christianity Today magazine, and the book The Todd Phenomenon by Darryl E. Hicks.

=== Similarities to other preachers ===
Todd was not the only speaker making the rounds in evangelical Christian circles in the 1970s warning young people against the occult. Todd's claims of being a Satanic high priest before his conversion were similar to claims by Hershel Smith and Mike Warnke. In one meeting between Todd and Warnke, the two had a backstage confrontation and Todd accused Warnke of stealing his testimony regarding the Illuminati.

== Publications based on Todd's claims ==
Todd has appeared in several of Jack Chick's publications. Chick first promoted Todd's message in comic form in The Broken Cross, a comic that portrays a town controlled by organized Satanists, who ignore ritual murders and teach witchcraft to children in school. In another Chick comic book, Spellbound?, a character called "Lance Collins" describes himself as a former druid and member of the Illuminati. The character claims that Satanists control the rock music industry and are infiltrating churches, and urges Christians to burn their rock music records, Ouija boards and Dungeons & Dragons game sets. Both comics offer "deepest appreciation to John Todd, ex-grand Druid priest".

Todd's stories about the Illuminati were published as the comic book The Illuminati and Witchcraft in 1980 by Jacob Sailor. His claims partially became the basis for a different book, Witchcraft and the Illuminati, published in 1981 by The Covenant, The Sword, and the Arm of the Lord, a Christian Identity group, and reprinted in 1999 by the Christian Patriot Association. This book repeated many of Todd's claims, including the alleged power structure of the Illuminati and the idea that Atlas Shrugged was the Illuminati's secret blueprint, but added Identity beliefs derogatory toward Jews and African Americans.

After Todd's veracity was questioned and investigated, Chick continued to defend him and publish tracts based on Todd's life. Author Cynthia Burack wrote that Chick often made "excuses for behaviours that were inconsistent with Todd's status as a high-profile Christian convert," and that his "propensities to indulge in conspiracy theory and to lash out at putative allies who question his conclusions" in his defense of Todd and other controversial figures (namely Alberto Rivera and Rebecca Brown) resulted in a split between himself and the conservative Christian movement.
