= Silence Screams =

Studio album by REZ
- Released: 1988
- Recorded: 1988
- Studio: Tone Zone Studios, Chicago, Illinois
- Genre: Christian rock
- Length: 43:32
- Label: Grrr Records
- Producer: REZ, Tom Cameron and "a few close friends"

REZ chronology
Between Heaven 'n Hell (1985)	Silence Screams (1988)	REZ: Compact Favorites (1988)

Professional ratings
Review scores
Source	Rating
CCM Magazine	
Kerrang!	4/5 stars

Silence Screams is the eighth studio album, by American Christian rock band Resurrection Band (known at this point as REZ), released in 1988.

== Recording history ==
After the longest break between studio albums, REZ returned with a blues-based hard rock/metal sound (closer to their 1978 release Awaiting Your Reply) that would set the pattern for all future releases, and was also indicative of the musical direction lead singer Glenn Kaiser would take in his solo career. The album is highlighted by a cover of Blind Faith's "Presence of the Lord," which was the first in a string of cover tunes that REZ would include on almost every successive release.

As indicated by the unsettling album cover art, the lyrics deal with some very dark themes by focusing on the plight of the disenfranchised, whether they be victims of war ("Someone Sleeps"), greed ("Waitin' on Sundown") or racial profiling ("Three Seconds"). "Light/Light" is another of the album's highlights, and proved a popular live track throughout the 1990s.

This is the first album the band released on their own record label, Grrr Records, and the first with new bassist Roy Montroy, since Jim Denton left the band in 1987 to enter theological seminary.

== Track listing ==
All songs written by Glenn Kaiser and Roy Montroy unless otherwise noted

1. "Silence Screams" – 4:13
2. "You Got Me Rockin'" (Stu Heiss, Kaiser) – 3:15
3. "Someone Sleeps" (Kaiser, Montroy, Jon Trott) – 5:21 originally titled "I See Red", and more specifically concerned Native Americans .
4. "Waitin' on Sundown" (Jim Denton, Kaiser, Trott) – 4:06
5. "Presence of the Lord" (Eric Clapton) – 4:35
6. "Light/Light" – 3:44
7. "Rain Dance" (Montroy, Trott) – 5:06
8. "Every Waking Hour" (Kaiser) – 4:06
9. "Three Seconds" (Kaiser, Montroy, Trott) – 4:37
10. "You Get What You Choose" – 4:29

== Personnel ==
REZ is:

- Glenn Kaiser - Vocals, guitars
- Wendi Kaiser - Vocals
- Stu Heiss - Lead guitar, keyboards
- Roy Montroy - Bass guitar, keyboards
- John Herrin - Drums

Additional Musicians:

- Percy Bady - Keyboards on "Silence Screams," "You Got Me Rockin'," "Someone Sleeps," "Presence of the Lord," and "Light/Light"

== Production ==
- Producers - REZ, Tom Cameron and "a few close friends"
- Engineers - Roy Montroy, Ed Bialach and Roger Heiss
- Mastering - Steve Hall at Future Disc
- Cover design and photo - Cornerstone Graphics
- Cover art - Dick Randall
