= Hostage (Rez Band album) =

Studio album by Rez Band
- Released: 1984
- Recorded: 1984
- Studio: Tone Zone Studios, Chicago, Illinois
- Genre: Christian rock
- Length: 40:37
- Label: Sparrow
- Producer: Rez Band

Rez Band chronology
The Best of REZ: Music to Raise the Dead (1984)	Hostage (1984)	Between Heaven 'n Hell (1985)

Professional ratings
Review scores
Source	Rating
AllMusic	2.5/5 stars

Hostage is the sixth studio album, from American Christian rock band Resurrection Band (known at this time as "Rez Band"), released in late 1984.

== Recording history ==
Hostage was a radical departure into keyboard-driven new wave stylings which dominate the record, and this is due in large part to the fact that bassist and keyboardist Jim Denton took over much of the songwriting. Although the lead-off track, "S.O.S.", was popular on Christian radio, long-time Rez Band fans were extremely divided over the band's new musical direction, especially with strange sonic experiments like "Armageddon Appetite".

At the same time, "Attention" and "Crimes" are typical Rez Band hard rock efforts, which indicated to surprised listeners at the time that the band hadn't completely abandoned the sound for which they had become known. Besides, the lyrical themes of war, inner-city violence (of which the band was intimately familiar) and the spiritual and moral confusion of youth are once again front and center.

"Crimes" was the band's first music video and was filmed in the same run-down urban neighborhood in which the Jesus People USA community is located. It received limited airplay on MTV.

== Track listing ==
All songs written by Jim Denton unless otherwise noted

1. "S.O.S." – 4:03
2. "Attention" (Glenn Kaiser, Jon Trott, Roy Montroy, Stu Heiss) – 3:45
3. "Souls for Hire" (Kaiser) – 3:30
4. "Defective Youth" (Denton, John Herrin, Trott, Heiss) – 2:57
5. "Who's Real Anymore" – 4:06
6. "Armageddon Appetite" – 1:26
7. "Beyond the Gun" (Kaiser, Denton) – 4:20
8. "Crimes" (Kaiser, Denton, Herrin, Montroy, Heiss) – 3:38
9. "It's You" (Trott) – 2:02
10. "Tears in the Rain" (Denton, Herrin, Trott, Heiss) – 6:00
11. "Walk Away" (Kaiser, Denton) – 4:50

== Personnel ==
- Glenn Kaiser – lead and background vocals, guitars
- Wendi Kaiser – lead and background vocals
- Stu Heiss – lead guitar, keyboards
- Jim Denton – bass guitar, guitar, keyboards
- John Herrin – drums
- Steve Eisen – saxophone
- Tom Cameron – lead snoring
- Greg Jacques – door

Production

- Rez Band – producer
- Roger Heiss – engineer
- Roy Montroy – assistant engineer
- Greg Jacques – assistant engineer
- Steve Hall – mastering (at Future Disc)
- Cornerstone Graphics – album cover concept and art
- Janet Cameron – album cover concept and art
- Dick Randall – album cover concept and art
- Pat Peterson – photography
- Tom Wray – photography
