= Ty Tabor =

American musician

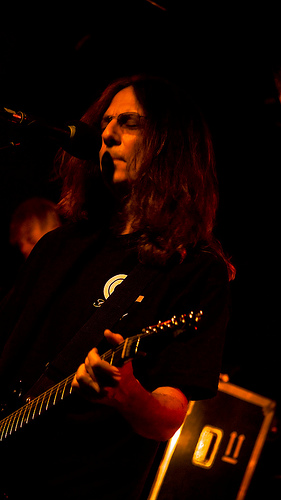
- Tabor performing with King's X in 2009

Background information
- Born: September 17, 1961 (age 64); Pearl, Mississippi, U.S.
- Genres: Hard rock, progressive rock
- Occupation(s): Musician, songwriter, record producer
- Instrument(s): Guitar, vocals
- Member of: King's X, The Jelly Jam
- Formerly of: Platypus

Ty Tabor (/ˈtaɪ ˈteɪbɜːr/ TAY-bur; born September 17, 1961) is an American musician. He is the lead guitarist, songwriter, and co-lead vocalist for the hard rock band King's X. Tabor has a wide-ranging guitar style, from big guitar riffs to middling melodic passages. His use of volume swells and ambient passages add an elemental texture to his compositions. He names his main influences as the Beatles, Allan Holdsworth, Johnny Winter, Ace Frehley, Mel Galley, Brian May, Joe Perry, Mick Box, Buck Dharma, Steve Marriott, Dave Davies, Pete Townshend, Mark Farner, John Fogerty, Alex Lifeson, Phil Keaggy, and the original Alice Cooper band. In 2008, Tabor was added to the guitar show "Chop Shop's" list of "Top 100 Most Complete Guitar Players of All Time" at number 84.

== Biography ==
Ty Tabor was born in Pearl, Mississippi, and began singing and playing guitar at a young age, and by his early teens was performing with his father and his brother in a bluegrass band in and around his native Jackson. Tabor had also been taken over by the rock and roll sounds of the 1960s and '70s (most notably, The Beatles and Alice Cooper) and began playing in rock bands in his teen years. One of these was a Christian rock outfit called Matthew. Upon graduating from high school, Tabor began touring with Matthew throughout the south. Times were tough on that tour with the band often setting up and performing in the parking lots of restaurants in exchange for food.

He left Matthew and decided to move to Springfield, Missouri, to attend Evangel College, where he quickly entrenched himself in the local music scene. One group he played with got the chance to open up for guitarist Phil Keaggy. However, right before the show, the drummer for Tabor's band quit. Instead of cancelling and missing out on the big opportunity, Tabor volunteered to play drums for the show. Not having his own drum kit, however, forced Tabor to ask Keaggy's drummer if he could use his. The drummer, who happened to be Jerry Gaskill, agreed and the show took place.

Tabor and Gaskill again crossed paths during some demo recording sessions with the Tracy Zinn Band. The two became friends and were involved off and on with other musical projects together.

In spring of 1980, Tabor was asked to perform at a talent show at Evangel with a female singer. In the audience was Doug Pinnick, who was impressed by Tabor's performance. Pinnick eventually got in touch with Tabor and the two began collaborating musically.

Eventually Tabor, Pinnick, Gaskill, and guitarist Dan McCollam formed their own band called The Edge which, over time, evolved into King's X. Tabor is the youngest member of King's X, with Pinnick being eleven years his senior, and Gaskill three-and-a-half years older than him.

Tabor also opened his own recording and mastering facility in Katy, Texas, called Alien Beans Studios. He has mastered numerous album projects as well as produced albums by Rez Band, Jerry Gaskill's solo album, Come Somewhere, and many others. Tabor has since relocated and moved Alien Beans Studios to Kansas City.

=== Solo works ===
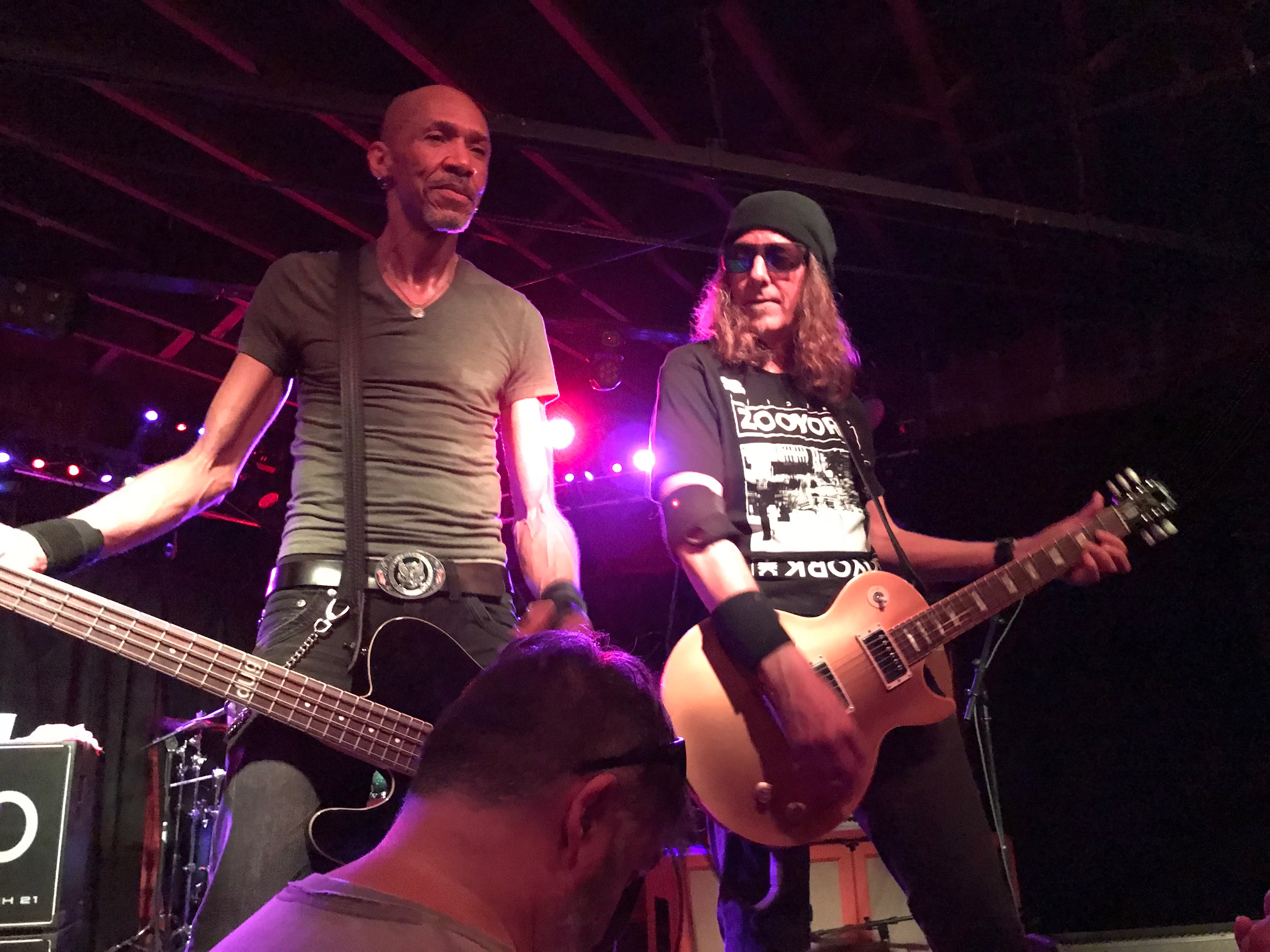
Doug Pinnick and Tabor in 2018

After writing and performing almost exclusively for King's X for over 15 years, Tabor's first solo album, Naomi's Solar Pumpkin, was released independently in 1997. Most of the songs from that debut appeared (re-recorded) on his following 1998 album, Moonflower Lane. It was released on Metal Blade Records with much wider distribution as well as a few new tracks, and also featured drummer Alan Doss on the entire album.

Tabor's next release was 2002's Safety, a much more introspective album that reflected on his then-recent divorce. Subsequent Tabor solo albums are Rock Garden (2006), Balance (2008), Something's Coming (2010), Nobody Wins When Nobody Plays (2013) and Shades (2022).

=== Other bands ===
Tabor has also been a member of several other bands. He played guitar and sang in Platypus featuring Rod Morgenstein (previously of the Dixie Dregs and Winger) on drums, John Myung (of Dream Theater) on bass, and keyboardist Derek Sherinian (of Planet X and formerly Dream Theater). They released two albums.

The same group minus Derek Sherinian continued on as The Jelly Jam and currently have four full-length albums to their credit.

Ty played guitar solos on two tracks, Ode To Pain and Goodbye 25, with Dallas/Houston friends, Mind Body Soul, on their self-titled 4-song EP in 1998, which Ty also mixed and mastered.

Tabor was also involved with the band Jughead featuring two-time David Lee Roth band member Gregg Bissonette (drums), Derek Sherinian (keyboards), and Matt Bissonette (lead vocals, bass). Jughead's self-titled LP was released in 2002 on InsideOut Music.

Tabor has guest appearances on several albums including two different Carmine Appice Guitar Zeus albums, Loudness drummer Munetaka Higuchi's Free World album, and Gregg Bissonette's self-titled solo record.

He also played electric guitar and bass on King's X bandmate Jerry Gaskill's solo album Come Somewhere.

He currently has an ambient / electronica style project with Wally Farkas called Xenuphobe. They have 2 albums that were released through Molken Music.

Tabor also sang one of the human roles on Ayreon's release, 01011001. He played the character "Ty" in the first interlude, Connect the Dots.

Tabor, along with King's X bandmate Doug Pinnick and former Galactic Cowboys members Wally Farkas and Alan Doss, have a band called The Jibbs who have a single song available for download to benefit relief efforts in the aftermath of Hurricane Ike.

== Discography ==
=== King's X ===
See: King's X discography

=== Solo ===
- Naomi's Solar Pumpkin (independent, 1997)
- Moonflower Lane (Metal Blade, 1998)
- In the New Age (independent, 2002) – A CD-R sold exclusively through tytabor.com
- Safety (Metal Blade, 2002)
- Homeschool (The Demos * Vol. 1) (independent, 2006) – A CD-R sold exclusively through tytabor.com
- Rock Garden (InsideOut, Release date: August 29, 2006)
- Tacklebox (Molken Music, 2006) – A 2-disc collection of demo recordings with 3 previously unreleased songs
- Balance (Molken Music, 2008)
- Something's Coming (Molken Music, 2010)
- Trip Magnet (Molken Music, 2010)
- Nobody Wins When Nobody Plays (Molken Music, 2013)
- Almost Live from Alien Beans Studio (Molken Music, 2014) – DVD
- Alien Beans (RatPak Records, 2018)
- Angry Monk (Tabor Tooth Music, 2020)
- Shades (RatPak Records, 2022)

=== Side projects ===
- Platypus – When Pus Comes to Shove (1998)
- Platypus – Ice Cycles (2000)
- The Jelly Jam – The Jelly Jam (2002)
- Jughead – Jughead (2002)
- The Jelly Jam – 2 (2004)
- Xenuphobe – 1.0 (2006)
- Xenuphobe – 2.0 (2007)
- The Jibbs – "Burns In The Rain" single (2008)
- The Jelly Jam – Shall We Descend (2011)
- Xenuphobe – Drone (2015)
- The Jelly Jam – Profit (2016)

=== Guest appearances ===
- Morgan Cryar – Fuel on the Fire (1986)
- Rez Band – Lament (1995)
- Carmine Appice – Guitar Zeus 1 (1996)
- Munetaka Higuchi – Free World (1997)
- Carmine Appice – Guitar Zeus 2 (1997)
- Mind Body Soul – Mind Body Soul (1998; EP)
- Greg Bissonette – Greg Bissonette (1998)
- Richie Scarlet – Insanity Of Life (2002)
- Various artists – Influences and Connections: Mr. Big Tribute (2003)
- Maston – Tampering With The Laws Of Goodness (2004)
- Jerry Gaskill – Come Somewhere (2004)
- Ayreon – 01011001 (2008)
- Tadashi Goto – Innervisions track "Liberal Paradox" (2008)
- Petur Polson – Tokyo track "Andvekur" (2009)
- Mountain of Power – Volume Two track "Waves" (2010)
- Blindstone – Rise Above Guitar solo on the track "Rise Above" + mastering (2010)
- Geoff Tate's Queensrÿche – Frequency Unknown (2013)
