= Mike Warnke =

American comedian, evangelist, and author

- In December 2001
- Born: Michael Alfred Warnke; November 19, 1946 (age 79); Evansville, Indiana, U.S.
- Education: Rim of the World High School
- Alma mater: San Bernardino Valley College
- Occupations: Christian evangelist, comedian
- Known for: Discredited "expert" on Satanism, Christian comedy
- Spouses: Sue Studer (m. 1967; div. 1975) Carolyn Alberty (m. 1975; div. 1979) Rose Hall (m. 1980; div. 1991) Susan Patton (m. 1991)
- Children: 2
- Website: www.mikewarnke.org

Michael Alfred Warnke (born November 19, 1946) is an American Christian evangelist and comedian who was exposed in 1992 for inventing stories of his past as a Satanist. Before being debunked by the Christian magazine Cornerstone, he was presented in media appearances as an authority on Satanism.

== Early life ==
Mike Warnke was born in 1946 to parents Alfred "Al" Warnke and Louise Warnke of Evansville, Indiana. When he was five years old, the Warnke family moved to Manchester, Tennessee, where his father opened a truck stop. In 1955, Warnke's mother was killed in a car accident. In 1958 his father died, leaving Warnke an orphan.

After the death of his father, Warnke was taken to live with two of his aunts in Sparta, and from there to Mike's half-sister and her husband in San Bernardino, California. In June 1965, he graduated from Rim of the World High School in Lake Arrowhead. That September, Warnke enrolled at San Bernardino Valley College but withdrew after one semester, whereupon by his account, he began his tenure as a Satanist. On June 2, 1966, Warnke enlisted in the United States Navy. After graduating from boot camp on August 22, 1966, his assigned military occupational specialty was as a hospital corpsman.

According to the account of his life in The Satan Seller, Warnke converted to Christianity during boot camp. However, high-school acquaintance Charlotte Tweeten has stated she recalls Warnke proclaiming faith in Christ in the year prior to his navy enlistment in 1966. He also wrote that he began dating fellow Rim of the World High School alumna, Sue Studer, during this time period. This has been disproven, however, and Warnke was actually engaged to Lois Eckenrod at this time. In 1967, he completed naval corpsman training, returned to San Diego, and married Studer. Together, they had two children.

In 1969 Warnke was deployed to Vietnam for a six-month tour of duty. Having been wounded in battle during those six months, he was awarded the Purple Heart. Warnke's own written accounts differ on the number of times he sustained injuries during his time in Vietnam. In The Satan Seller, Warnke says he was wounded twice, while in his second book, Hitchhiking on Hope Street, he states he was wounded five times. Despite these wounds received during his tour of duty as a hospital corpsman, second class, Warnke's various accounts have him spending much time detained, allegedly killing a man in battle, and surviving being shot several times, including once by an arrow. Warnke says it was the latter wound for which he was awarded the Purple Heart. Warnke returned to the United States in 1970.

While still serving in the navy, Warnke teamed up with San Diego evangelist Morris Cerullo and was touted for his "Satanist experience". Warnke and Cerullo toured the country participating in charismatic revival meetings. Cerullo wanted to write a book about youth occultism, and assigned the writing task to David Balsiger with help from Warnke. In early 1972, Warnke requested and received an early discharge from the navy as a conscientious objector so that he could work full-time in the ministry. Warnke then left Cerullo's ministry to start his own, forbidding Cerullo to use any of his material. It was at this time that Warnke and Balsiger went on to write the book that would make Warnke famous.

== Rise to fame ==
=== The Satan Seller ===
In 1972, Warnke's book The Satan Seller was released, written by Warnke with help from Balsiger and Les Jones. The book tells of Warnke being orphaned as a child and his introduction into Satanism. Further detailed is Warnke's participation in sexual orgies, alcoholism, and drug dealing; his rise in the ranks of Satanism to the level of "high priest"; presiding over Satanic rituals including magical spells, summoning demons, ritual sex including a kidnap and rape; the attempt on his life of a heroin overdose that left him angry and disillusioned; his heroism in Vietnam; and how he found Jesus and came home as an evangelist. The story ends with Warnke living happily in California with wife Sue Studer. In less than three months after the release, The Satan Seller had become a religious best-seller.

The book launched Warnke into stardom within evangelical Christian communities. He became a popular speaker at Christian meeting places such as Melodyland in Anaheim, California. In 1974, he moved his family to attend Trinity Bible College in Tulsa, Oklahoma as a nine-month preparation for ministry. It was here among other charismatic Christians and recent converts preparing for a life of ministry that Warnke met Carolyn Alberty and the two began an extramarital affair. Warnke also met Elijah Coady, an independent, schismatic bishop of the Assyrian Church of the East who ordained Warnke as a deacon. Upon graduation, Warnke was again ordained, and he moved with his family to Denver, Colorado.

=== Recordings and wives ===
In November 1975 at an Indiana coffeehouse, Warnke's talk about his conversion from Satanism to Christianity was incidentally recorded. This recording became his first album, Alive, which was soon widely played on Christian radio. Later that same year, despite interventions from pastors and other acclaimed ministers, Warnke left his wife for Alberty and filed for divorce. The divorce was finalized in December 1975 and four months later, Warnke married Alberty.

Warnke's popularity earned him the cover of the September 1976 issue of the Christian magazine Harmony. In 1977, he released his second album, Jester In The King's Court. In 1978, he recounted his Vietnam experiences on his third album, Hey, Doc!. Warnke's albums became "the most popular Christian comedy albums ever produced". During a tour to Hazard, Kentucky, Warnke met Rose Hall, a thrice-divorced mother of three children, and began courting her while still married to his second wife. His second marriage came to an end when, as Alberty stated in an interview, "[Warnke] threw me into a wall and split my head open. He said, 'If you go to a local hospital and tell them what your name is, I'll kill you.'" Alberty fled to Florida. By November 1979, their divorce was finalized, and Warnke moved to Hall's farm in Kentucky. On January 2, 1980, Warnke and Hall were married.

Warnke and his label, Word Records, feuded over an album which he eventually produced and distributed on his own, A Christian's Perspective on Halloween (1979). Word Records and Warnke reconciled by 1981, resulting in Coming Home (1981), and now including wife Rose, Higher Education (1982) and Growing Up (1983). Under Word's Dayspring label, Warnke then released (solo) Stuff Happens (1985), Good News Tonight (1986), One In A Million (1988), Live ... Totally Weird (1989). Warnke also made a VHS home video, Do You Hear Me? (1989).

During the 1980s, Warnke's ministry prospered as he and his new wife toured and performed together, raising millions of dollars for their ministry. Contributions to the ministry were over $1 million in 1985, and over $2 million each year from 1987 through 1990. As their popularity waxed, their personal relationship waned. In 1984, Warnke's third wife wrote, "Satan provided a woman to fill the gap in Michael's life." The Warnkes separated in 1989 and later divorced in 1991. Six weeks after the divorce was finalized, Warnke married Rim of the World High School alumna Susan Patton.

=== Extravagant claims ===
In 1982 Warnke began to exaggerate his achievements. His claims of academic degrees increased from two bachelor's degrees to two master's degrees to a Doctorate of Philosophy. In The Satan Seller, Warnke says he was wounded twice while in Vietnam. In Hitchhiking on Hope Street, he said he had been wounded five times. He followed up his interest in the Syro-Chaldean tradition and his 1970s ordination as a deacon with a 1983 ordination by independent bishop Richard Morrill, lately of the Byzantine Catholic Church, Inc. This ordination allowed Warnke to call himself bishop.

=== National exposure ===
On May 16, 1985, Warnke appeared in a prime-time news report about Satanism on ABC's 20/20. In the show's episode titled "The Devil Worshippers", Warnke was included in a number of segments where he discussed the implements and clothing used in Satanic ceremonies, a scar allegedly indicating where he was repeatedly cut so that his blood could be used in Satanic ceremonies, and what drew him to Satanism. After Warnke's appearance on 20/20, he was frequently cited as an expert on the occult by Christian radio host Bob Larson and the Chick Publications stable of authors.

== Investigation and debunking ==
In 1991, Cornerstone magazine launched an investigation into Warnke's life and testimony. The previous year, the magazine had debunked Lauren Stratford's story that had been recounted in her book Satan's Underground. Stratford claimed her deep involvement in Satanism led her to partake in a ritual in which her own child was sacrificed. After the exposé showed Stratford's alleged child had never existed, Cornerstone journalists Mike Hertenstein and Jon Trott investigated Warnke and his claims.

The Cornerstone investigation spanned from interviews with over 100 of Warnke's personal friends and acquaintances to his ministry's tax receipts. It revealed a number of inaccuracies and evidence of fraud and deceit in Warnke's accounts. During the course of Cornerstone's investigation, pictures of Warnke taken during the time he was alleged to be a Satanist priest were discovered. Rather than showing an emaciated drug-addict sporting long fingernails and waist-length hair, the pictures showed Warnke as a typical "square" of the mid-1960s. The investigation also revealed Warnke's claims that he and Charles Manson had attended a Satanic ritual to be false; Manson was in federal prison at the time, having no known ties to Satanic churches.

The investigation further uncovered that before joining the navy, Warnke had been involved with the college Christian ministry Campus Crusade for Christ. The investigation also revealed the unflattering circumstances surrounding Warnke's multiple marriages, affairs, and divorces. Regarding one Christian intervention attempt, the Cornerstone article states, "[Don] Riling, Mike Johnson, Wes Yoder, and Mike and Carolyn were there. 'You’d have never guessed that this was a meeting of Christians,' says Riling. 'Mike and Carolyn were swearing the whole time, and they must have gone through a whole pack of cigarettes.'"

Most critically, the investigation showed how Warnke could not have done the many things he claimed to have taken part in throughout the nine months he claimed to be a Satanist—including his claims to be a drug-addicted dealer or a Satanic high priest. Before publishing, Cornerstone contacted Warnke for an interview, but he and the magazine could not agree to terms for such an interview. Cornerstone revealed its story at the annual Christian Booksellers Association convention in June 1992.

== Aftermath ==
Warnke sent a response to Cornerstone, published in July, insisting he told the truth, stating:

I stand by my testimony of being delivered and set free by the power of Jesus Christ after being a Satanic high priest exactly as published in my book, The Satan Seller. ... some information was purposefully changed to protect the privacy of certain individuals and to prevent readers from using the book as a guide for occultism and Satanic purposes. But, as we stated in the front of the book, 'The events are absolutely as described.'

Despite these assertions, Warnke did not provide the name of a single Satanist but used invectives against ex-wife Carolyn. In the ensuing months, he conceded parts of the allegations, telling Christianity Today that there had been only thirteen members of his coven, not 1,500 as originally claimed, and that of those thirteen, the whereabouts of five were unknown to him, while the other eight had since died.

Public response was varied but generally against Warnke. Initially, Word Records stated that they would stand by their artist. However, further investigations by local Kentucky reporters at the Lexington Herald-Leader revealed that Warnke's ministry had engaged in financial misdeeds and that, "Mike, his ex-wife Rose, and her brother Neale [Hall] received a total of $809,680 in salary at a time when the ministry newsletter claimed donations were down and more funds were needed." One week later, Word Records dropped Warnke from its label. Finally, on September 30, 1992, fewer than 100 days after the investigation was made public, Warnke's ministry closed its doors.

In the spring of 1993, Warnke submitted to the authority of an assembly of ministers "acting as elders", acknowledging his "ungodliness", his "multiple divorces", his "failure as husband, father, and friend", and of "embellishment and exaggeration ... in an attempt ... to entertain", and offering to pay back taxes to the federal government. The group recommended specific changes to the ministry, including a salary cap and accountability reports. Nonetheless, he continued to "stand by [his] testimony of former Satanic involvement", stating in a 2000 interview with the Daily Oklahoman, "Exaggeration did creep into some of my stories, but my testimony is still my testimony." As of 2006, a letter posted on Warnke's web site indicated the group had released him as having met their accountability requirements.

In 1997, Warnke suffered a heart attack. In 2000, he began attempting a comeback, limited to small churches in Kentucky. In 2002, he published Friendly Fire: A Recovery Guide for Believers Battered by Religion (ISBN 0-7684-2124-1), an account of what he perceived as his unfair treatment by fellow Christians in the wake of the Cornerstone exposé. By 2004, he was making occasional performing appearances at churches around the country, often referred to simply as "Christian comedian Mike Warnke", and sometimes as a former Satanic priest although some mentions in the news referred to the Cornerstone exposé.

Presently, Warnke operates a website which describes him as a former satanic priest and solicits online donations.

== See also ==
- Tony Anthony – A British evangelist whose claims were exposed as false
- Ergun Caner – Former college President who made similar claims that he was an Islamic terrorist that have been disputed
- John Todd – An American who claimed to have been a Satanic high priest before his conversion to Christianity
- Michelle Remembers – A discredited memoir detailing Satanic ritual abuse by Canadian psychiatrist Lawrence Pazder and his patient and later wife, Michelle Smith
