= XX Years Live =

Live album by REZ
- Released: 1992
- Recorded: 1992
- Venue: Copernicus Center Theatre, Chicago, Illinois
- Genre: Christian rock
- Length: 106:07
- Label: Grrr
- Producer: REZ and Tom Cameron

REZ chronology
Civil Rites (1991)	XX Years Live (1992)	Reach of Love (1993)

Professional ratings
Review scores
Source	Rating
Firestream	4.5/5 stars

XX Years Live is the 14th release, and second live album, from American Christian rock band Resurrection Band (known at this time as "REZ"), released in 1992.

== Recording history ==
A double-CD set, XX Years Live was recorded in March of that same year at the Copernicus Center Theatre in Chicago, to celebrate 20 years of music ministry. The concert features at least one song from every REZ release, and in addition, Glenn Kaiser and his wife and co-lead singer, Wendi Kaiser, take a few minutes each to speak to the audience.

== Track listing ==
Track listing adapted from AllMusic

Disc one

1. "Introduction/Waves" – 2:49
2. "Military Man" – 3:29
3. "Afrikaans" – 3:02
4. "Attention" – 3:47
5. "Colours" – 3:36
6. "Players" – 3:25
7. "The Struggle" – 3:50
8. "Fiend or Foul" – 5:00
9. "Alienated" – 2:00
10. "Paint a Picture" – 4:26
11. "Wendi's Rap" – 4:43
12. "Right on Time" – 5:10
13. "Love Comes Down" – 3:25
14. "White Noise" – 5:09

Disc two

1. "My Jesus Is All" – 4:42
2. "Lovespeak" – 3:25
3. "In Your Arms" – 3:36
4. "Bargain" – 4:50
5. "Shadows" – 4:47
6. "Somebody to Love" – 2:50
7. "Every Time It Rains" – 4:29
8. "Where Roses Grow" – 9:12
9. "Light/Light" – 4:00
10. "Glenn's Rap" – 5:56
11. "I Will Do My Last Singing in this Land, Somewhere" – 4:27

== Personnel ==
- Glenn Kaiser – vocals, guitar
- Wendi Kaiser – vocals
- Stu Heiss – guitar, keyboards
- Roy Montroy – bass guitar, keyboards
- John Herrin – drums
- Tom Cameron – harmonica
- Hilde Bialach – keyboards
- Willie Kemp – keyboards
- Steve Eisen – saxophone

Production

- REZ – producers
- Tom Cameron – producer
- Ed Bialach – engineer
- Roy Montroy – engineer
- Roger Heiss – engineer
- Steve Hall – mastering
