= Civil Rites =

Studio album by REZ
- Released: 1991
- Recorded: 1991
- Studio: Tone Zone Studios, Chicago, Illinois
- Genre: Christian rock
- Length: 42:47
- Label: Grrr
- Producer: REZ, Tom Cameron

REZ chronology
| Innocent Blood (1989) | Civil Rites (1991) | XX Years Live (1992) |

Professional ratings
Review scores
| Source | Rating |
|---|---|
| Cornerstone | |

Civil Rites is the tenth studio album, by American Christian rock band Resurrection Band (known at this point as "REZ"), released in 1991.

== Recording history ==
By now, REZ had perfected their recent formula of blues-based rock, as evidenced in songs like "Footprints" and "In My Room", interspersed with AC/DC-inspired heavy metal numbers like the album's opener, "Lovespeak", as well as "Comatose". Co-lead singer Wendi Kaiser is given more to do on this record, which is good or bad depending on the listener's opinion of her vocal style. Along with "Comatose" and "Death Machine," she duets with her husband Glenn Kaiser on the uptempo blues number "Hotfootin'" and closes out the album with a cover of the classic Jefferson Airplane song, "Somebody to Love". Given that her voice has often been compared to Grace Slick, it's an appropriate choice.

Civil Rites is also more forcefully evangelical than REZ' two prior releases. The band returns to issues of importance to its younger high-school-aged audience, like casual sex and its emotional aftermath (song "Players"), family turmoil ("In My Room"), and drug addiction—specifically crack cocaine ("Little Jeanie"). Prostitution and drug use ("Comatose"), the remaining cultural aftereffects of slavery ("Lincoln's Train"), and harsh criticism of the military-industrial complex ("Death Machine")—a frequent, ongoing REZ theme—are topics dealt with as well. On a brighter note, however, the upbeat "Hotfootin'" pays tribute to the tireless work of street preachers.

== Track listing ==
1. "Lovespeak" – 3:29
2. "Mission Bells" – 3:36
3. "Comatose" – 3:31
4. "Death Machine" – 2:57
5. "Players" – 4:17
6. "Lincoln's Train" – 4:42
7. "Hotfootin'" – 2:54
8. "Little Jeanie" – 4:29
9. "Footprints" – 2:37
10. "Pauper's Grave" – 4:30
11. "In My Room" – 2:44
12. "Somebody to Love" – 3:01

== Personnel ==
- Glenn Kaiser – vocals, guitars, harmonica
- Wendi Kaiser – vocals
- Stu Heiss – electric and acoustic guitars, keyboards
- Roy Montroy – bass guitar, keyboards
- John Herrin – drums

Production

- REZ – producer, mixing
- Tom Cameron – producer
- Ed Bialach – engineer
- Roy Montroy – engineer
- Roger Heiss – engineer, mixing
- Steve Hall – mastering
