= Between Heaven 'n Hell =

Between Heaven 'N Hell

Studio album by REZ
- Released: 1985
- Recorded: 1985
- Studio: Tone Zone Studios, Chicago, Illinois
- Genre: Christian rock
- Length: 40:39
- Label: Sparrow
- Producer: REZ

REZ chronology
Hostage (1984)	Between Heaven 'N Hell (1985)	Silence Screams (1988)

Professional ratings
Review scores
Source	Rating
AllMusic	4/5 stars

Between Heaven 'N Hell is the seventh studio album from American Christian rock band Resurrection Band, released in 1985. This is the first album on which Resurrection Band shortened its moniker to "REZ", and it also marks the band's final album for Sparrow Records.

== Recording history ==
On REZ' follow-up to Hostage, the band jettisons much of the new wave, keyboard-driven musical stylings from that album in favor of the band's traditional hard rock sound. Glenn Kaiser takes over the majority of the songwriting once again, while his wife and co-lead singer Wendi Kaiser makes her most significant songwriting contributions here. This explains the likely reason her image, pulled from a live concert performance, is prominently featured on the album cover.

Between Heaven 'N Hell is also significant for being REZ' attempt to cross over to the mainstream market. Although the lyrics of the album still contain bold declarations of faith to the listener, the band opted to focus less on evangelism and more on performance for the tour which supported this album. The first single, "Love Comes Down", was shopped to mainstream rock stations, and the band's most sophisticated music video was filmed for that song, which achieved regular rotation on MTV for a brief period of time.

By 1985, the issue of apartheid in South Africa had come to national prominence in pop music with the release of Artists United Against Apartheid's "Sun City", and although REZ had already addressed the subject several years prior on 1979's Rainbow's End, "Zuid Afrikan" reminded listeners that the issue was still of importance to the band. Other highlights on Between Heaven 'N Hell include the closing track, "2,000", and "Shadows", which became a live favorite due to its unflinching depiction of the destructiveness of teenage suicide.

== Track listing ==
All songs written by Glenn Kaiser unless otherwise noted

1. "The Main Event" (G. Kaiser, Roy Montroy) – 3:03
2. "Love Comes Down" – 3:08
3. "Zuid Afrikan" – 5:20
4. "Walk On" (Tom Cameron, G. Kaiser, Wendy Kaiser) – 3:42
5. "Talk to Me" (Jim Denton, G. Kaiser, Jon Trott) – 4:25
6. "I Think You Know" – 3:13
7. "Shadows" (G. Kaiser, W. Kaiser, Trott) – 5:00
8. "Save Me from Myself" (Denton) – 3:30
9. "Nervous World" (G. Kaiser, W. Kaiser) – 4:22
10. "2,000" (G. Kaiser, Montroy, Trott) – 4:56

== Personnel ==
- Glenn Kaiser – vocals, guitars
- Wendi Kaiser – vocals
- Stu Heiss – lead guitar
- Jim Denton – bass guitar, keyboards
- John Herrin – drums, percussion

Production

- REZ – producer
- Roger Heiss – engineer
- Larry Bishop – assistant engineer
- Roy Montroy – assistant engineer
- Steve Hall – mastering
- Future Disc – mastering location
- Cornerstone Graphics – album cover concept and art
  - Dick Randall
  - Janet Cameron
  - Bob Cox
  - Pat Peterson
  - Tom Wray
- Bruce Hamsher – front cover photo
- Cornerstone Graphics – back cover and sleeve photos
- Mike Tabor – back cover and sleeve photos
