= Colours (Resurrection Band album) =

Studio album by Resurrection Band
- Released: 1980
- Recorded: 1980
- Studio: Chicago Recording Co., Chicago, Illinois
- Genre: Christian rock
- Length: 36:01
- Label: Light
- Producer: Resurrection Band

Resurrection Band chronology
Rainbow's End (1979)	Colours (1980)	Mommy Don't Love Daddy Anymore (1981)

Colours is the third full-length album by American Christian rock band Resurrection Band, released in 1980.

== Recording history ==
Colours was Resurrection Band's first release for Christian label Light Records, which had up to this time been known as the primary record label for Andraé Crouch and similar gospel artists. Colours is also considered by some music critics to be one of the band's defining works.

Resurrection Band embraced a more radio-friendly rock and metal sound with this album, which is a mix of personal reflections on God's sovereignty and love ("Autograph," "Amazing" and the title track), the harsh life of the inner city ("N.Y.C.", "Beggar in the Alleyway"), and the need for personal redemption ("City Streets", "The Struggle"). "American Dream" is significant for being the first of many songs that Resurrection Band would write about the moral rot at the center of America's political and media culture, indicating a more progressive political worldview than most Christian musicians would sing about at the time.

The photos of the children inside the gatefold cover are those of Jesus People USA community members.

This is the only Resurrection Band album to feature no piano or keyboards whatsoever.

== Track listing ==
All songs by Glenn Kaiser unless otherwise noted

1. "Autograph" – 4:03
2. "Colours" – 4:58
3. "N.Y.C." (Kaiser, Jim Denton) – 3:24
4. "Hidden Man" – 2:48
5. "Amazing" (Kaiser, Denton) – 2:22
6. "American Dream" (Jon Trott, Kaiser, Denton) – 3:24
7. "Benny & Sue" (Jon Trott, Kaiser, Denton, Stu Heiss) – 3:53
8. "City Streets" (Kaiser, Trott, Denton) – 3:22
9. "Beggar in the Alleyway" (Kaiser, Heiss) – 3:57
10. "The Struggle" (Kaiser, Denton, Heiss) – 3:45

== Personnel ==
- Glenn Kaiser – vocals, guitars
- Wendi Kaiser – vocals
- Stu Heiss – guitars
- Jim Denton – bass guitar
- John Herrin – drums
- Resurrection Band – producer, mixing
- Phil Bonanno – engineer
- Tom Henson – engineer
- Roger Heiss – assistant engineer
- Mike Szarzynski – assistant engineer
- Phil Bonanno – mixing
- JPUSA Graphics – album cover concept
- Dick Randall – outside cover art
- Janet Cameron – inside art and layout
- Bob Cox – additional staff
- Lyda Price – additional staff
- Al Mross – additional staff
- Tom Fjelstad – photography
