= Mommy Don't Love Daddy Anymore =

Studio album by Resurrection Band
- Released: 1981
- Recorded: 1981
- Studio: Chicago Recording Co., Chicago, Illinois
- Genre: Christian rock
- Length: 35:55
- Label: Light
- Producer: Resurrection Band

Resurrection Band chronology
Colours (1980)	Mommy Don't Love Daddy Anymore (1981)	D.M.Z. (1982)

Professional ratings
Review scores
Source	Rating
CCM Magazine	

Mommy Don't Love Daddy Anymore is the fourth album by American Christian rock band Resurrection Band, released in 1981.

== Recording history ==
Resurrection Band's move toward a more pop-influenced hard rock sound is solidified on this release, which in many ways is a continuation of the lyrical themes and musical sounds first expressed on Colours. A small hint of the band's future incorporation of new wave keyboard stylings can also be heard on the closing track, "Lovin' You."

Once again, social issues ("Elevator Muzik" humorously trashes American materialism, "The Chair" addresses the plight of paraplegics, and the title track deals with the destructive effects of divorce on children), spiritual struggles ("The Crossing," "Alienated" and "Can't Do It on My Own") and evangelistic challenges to the listener ("First Degree Apathy" and "Stark/Spare") dominate the songs on the record. Along with Colours and Awaiting Your Reply, Mommy Don't Love Daddy Anymore is considered by many music critics to be among Resurrection Band's finest work, and was immediately recognized as such by the leading alternative Christian music magazine at the time, Harvest Rock Syndicate, which awarded the album five stars.

This album was re-released in 2005 by Retroactive Records.

== Track listing ==
All songs written by Glenn Kaiser unless otherwise noted

1. "Stark/Spare" (Kaiser, Stu Heiss) – 3:42
2. "Elevator Muzik" – 1:55
3. "Alienated" – 2:02
4. "Can't Get You Outta My Mind" – 2:52
5. "The Chair" – 5:06
6. "Can't Do It on My Own" – 2:50
7. "First Degree Apathy" – 3:03
8. "Mommy Don't Love Daddy Anymore" (Kaiser, Jon Trott) – 3:53
9. "The Crossing" (Kaiser, Trott) – 3:48
10. "Little Children" – 2:36
11. "Lovin' You" – 3:29

== Personnel ==
- Glenn Kaiser - vocals, guitars, keyboards, lead guitar (4, 5, 9)
- Wendi Kaiser - vocals
- Stu Heiss - lead guitar, keyboards
- Jim Denton - fretless bass, synthesizer
- John Herrin - drums
- Tom Cameron - lead snoring

== Production ==
- Producer - Resurrection Band
- Engineer - Phil Bonanno
- Mixers - Phil Bonanno, Roger Heiss and Resurrection Band
- Album cover concept - JPUSA Graphics
- Outside cover art - Janet Cameron
- Inside art and layout - Dick Randall

== Artwork ==
- Wendi Kaiser is pregnant with her and Glenn's second child in her photo on the back cover of the album.
- Graphic artist Dick Randall also posed for the cover painting with his wife, Arnie.
- The little boy on the cover and gatefold is Rick Williams, the nephew of Glenn & Wendi Kaiser and John and Tina Herrin.
- This is the last Resurrection Band album to be released with a gatefold cover.
