= Blindstone =

Blindstone is a Danish rock trio formed 2002 in Thisted, Denmark. The band has released nine albums so far: Manifesto (2003), Freedom's Calling (2008), Rise Above (2010), Greetings From The Karma Factory (2012), Rare Tracks (2012), Live in Denmark (2015), The Seventh Cycle Of Eternity (2016), Blues-O-Delic Celebration - A Tribute To The Blues (2017), Deliverance at The Crossroads (2019), and Scars To Remember (2023). The current lineup consists of Martin J. Andersen (guitars, vocals), Jesper Bunk (bass) and Anders Hvidtfeldt (drums), who replaced original drummer, Benjamin Hove a few months after the debut album was released in 2003. Andersen and Bunk made an appearance on George Clinton album How Late Do U Have 2BB4UR Absent? (2005) providing guitar and bass parts on a cover version of the old rock classic Whole Lotta Shakin' Goin On, along with Jesper's American Brother-in-law, Dwayne Dcat Cornelius on Drums. Although Blindstone have recorded cover versions of songs by artists such as Jimi Hendrix, Frank Zappa, Robin Trower, Funkadelic, Frank Marino and The Isley Brothers on their albums, the band's releases mainly consist of original material. All Blindstone albums have been released by New York based record company Grooveyard Records which is specialized in guitar oriented rock music.

Blindstone's second album Freedom's Calling was record of the month in Cutting Edge Magazine, September 2008. The album also got a 5 out of 5 rating by Scott Heller on Aural Innovations web zine.

Rise Above (2010) likewise received excellent reviews, an example being that of the Sea Of Tranquility website, where the album was rated four-and-a-half stars, out of five. The album contains guest appearances by King's X guitarist Ty Tabor and renowned Danish guitarist Poul Halberg. Tabor also mastered the album.
