= When Pus Comes to Shove =

Studio album by Platypus
- Released: August 25, 1998
- Recorded: Millbrook Sound Studios, New York & Alien Beans Studios, Houston.
- Genre: Progressive rock
- Length: 51:27
- Label: Velvel; InsideOut Music

Platypus chronology
When Pus Comes to Shove (1998)	Ice Cycles (2000)

Professional ratings
Review scores
Source	Rating
Allmusic	4/5 stars

When Pus Comes to Shove is the debut album of the band Platypus.

== Track listing ==
All music by Platypus. All lyrics by Ty Tabor, except Platt Opus by Derek Sherinian, Rod Morgenstein & Ty Tabor.

1. "Standing in Line" – 3:10
2. "Nothing to Say" – 4:54
3. "Rock Balls/Destination Unknown" – 7:40
4. "Platt Opus" – 5:01
5. "I'm with You" – 4:13
6. "Blue Plate Special" – 7:21
7. "Chimes" – 4:45
8. "Willie Brown" – 5:03
9. "Bye Bye" – 4:51
10. "What About the Merch?" – 4:29

== Personnel ==
- Ty Tabor — guitars, vocals, percussion
- Derek Sherinian — keyboards
- John Myung — bass
- Rod Morgenstein — drums; keyboards on "Chimes"
