= Ice Cycles =

Studio album by Platypus
- Released: March 15, 2000
- Recorded: October–December 1999
- Genre: Progressive metal
- Length: 45:55
- Label: InsideOut Music
- Producer: Platypus

Platypus chronology
When Pus Comes to Shove (1998)	Ice Cycles (2000)

Professional ratings
Review scores
Source	Rating
Allmusic	link
HM Magazine	(not rated)

Ice Cycles is the second album by the progressive metal group Platypus, released in 2000.

== Track listing ==
All music by Platypus. All lyrics by Ty Tabor.

1. Oh God – 4:16
2. Better Left Unsaid – 5:24
3. The Tower – 3:30
4. Cry – 6:15
5. I Need You – 4:17
6. 25 (instrumental) – 5:09
7. Gone – 6:42
8. Partial to the Bean (A Tragic American Quintogy) (instrumental) ( – 10:33 total)
  - Intro Pompatous – 0:21
  - Yoko Ono – 1:27
  - Yoko Two-No – 1:01
  - Yoko Three-No – 2:14
  - Platmosis – 1:16
  - Yoko Againo – 2:08
  - Yoko Outro – 2:07

The album cover lists the last song as one track with 7 parts (parts A through G on the back of the CD case), but the CD player displays 14 total tracks.

== Personnel ==
- Ty Tabor - vocals, guitars, percussion
- Derek Sherinian - keyboards
- John Myung - bass
- Rod Morgenstein - drums
