= Come Somewhere =

Studio album by Jerry Gaskill
- Released: April 27, 2004
- Genre: Rock
- Label: InsideOut
- Producer: Ty Tabor

Come Somewhere is the debut solo album by King's X drummer Jerry Gaskill. Gaskill wrote all of the material himself, with the exception of "Johnny's Song", which was co-written with Herb Gaskill. Jerry performed all of the vocals, most of the acoustic guitars, and some electric guitar. King's X bandmate Ty Tabor, who produced the album, contributed some guitar and keyboards.

== Track listing ==
No.	Title	Length
1.	"The Kids"	3:39
2.	"She's Cool"	3:22
3.	"Johnny's Song"	2:24
4.	"No Love"	4:29
5.	"L.A. Flight"	2:24
6.	"Faulty Start"	3:13
7.	"All the Way Home"	3:29
8.	"Crazy"	3:18
9.	"Garden Stroll"	1:25
10.	"Walk Alone"	3:33
11.	"Every Day"	2:53
12.	"Gallop"	3:06
13.	"Hello Mrs."	2:40
14.	"I Saw You Yesterday"	3:53
15.	"Face the Day"	3:48
Total length:		47:36

== Personnel ==
- Jerry Gaskill - vocals, drums, acoustic guitar, electric guitar
- Ty Tabor - electric guitar, bass, keyboard
