= Live Bootleg (Resurrection Band album) =

Live album by Rez Band
- Released: 1984
- Recorded: 1983
- Venue: The Odeum, Chicago, Illinois
- Genre: Christian rock
- Label: Sparrow
- Producer: Rez Band

Rez Band chronology
D.M.Z. (1982)	Live Bootleg (1984)	The Best of REZ: Music to Raise the Dead (1984)

Live Bootleg is the first live album by American Christian rock band Resurrection Band, released in 1984. It was the band's first release for Sparrow Records, and also their first under the shortened moniker "Rez Band." Live Bootleg was the group's biggest selling album.

== Recording history ==
Recorded at the Odeum Arena in Chicago over two nights, October 21 and 22, 1983, this album features a mixture of the band's most popular live tracks as well as two new songs: "Gameroom" and "Playground". The album also features the only time a song from one of the band's independent cassettes was ever re-recorded for one of their official releases ("Quite Enough"). "Gameroom" continues the trend begun on D.M.Z. of directly addressing the concerns of a high school aged audience, and the album closes with an evangelistic message from Glenn Kaiser, which was typical of the band's live performances.

Steve Taylor was Rez Band's opening act for this concert.

== Track listing ==
1. "Military Man"
2. "Gameroom"
3. "Wendi's Rap"
4. "Playground"
5. "Medley" ("Waves," "Awaiting Your Reply," "Broken Promises," "Autograph," "City Streets")
6. "White Noise"
7. "Quite Enough"
8. "Area 312"
9. "Can't Stop Loving You"
10. "Glenn's Rap"
- "Quite Enough" is a live version of a track from the band's first independent cassette, Music to Raise the Dead.

== Personnel ==
- Glenn Kaiser - vocals, guitar, keyboards
- Wendi Kaiser - vocals
- Stu Heiss - guitar, keyboards
- Jim Denton - bass guitar, synthesizer
- John Herrin - drums, Simmons Drums

== Production ==
- Rez Band – producer
- Phil Bonanno – engineer
- Roger Heiss – engineer
- Steve Hall – mastering
