= Tony Anthony (evangelist) =

British Christian evangelist (born 1971)

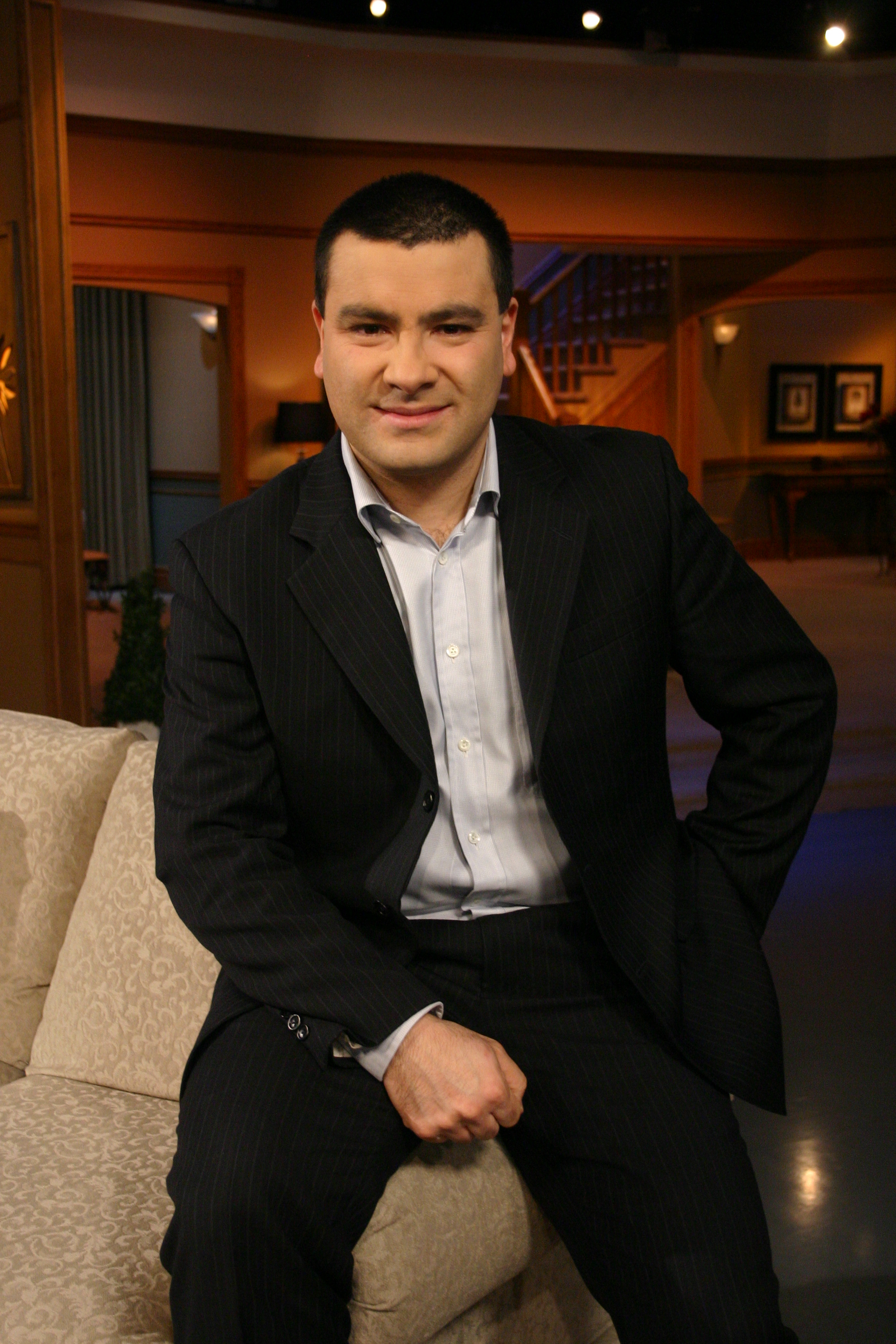
- Tony Anthony in 2009
- Born: 30 July 1971 (age 55)
- Occupations: Evangelist, author
- Known for: Fabricated biographical claims
- Notable work: Taming The Tiger
- Children: Two
- Website: tonyanthony.co.uk

Tony Anthony (born Andonis Andreou Athanasiou; 30 July 1971,) is a British Christian evangelist who published an autobiography that was subsequently determined to be a fabrication.

He became prominent following the 2004 publication of the book, Taming The Tiger, in which he wrote that as a child he was trained in kung fu by his grandfather, and became a world champion. He wrote that he was a bodyguard to a Saudi diplomat, leading security teams in operations around the world, before becoming involved in violent crime and later converting to Christianity. The book was well received by the Christian community, and Anthony began an international ministry as an evangelist.

An independent investigation in 2013, undertaken on behalf of the Evangelical Alliance and the charity that Anthony founded, determined that large sections of the book – including the notion Anthony lived in China as a child and was trained in martial arts – are entirely false.

== Biographical claims ==
Tony Anthony was born in London. According to his books, his father is Italian, and his mother is Chinese, and he spent part of his childhood with relatives in Canton, China. He claimed to have been trained in kung fu by his grandfather, and that he won three Kung Fu world championships after returning to London, before working as a bodyguard and turning to violence and crime, including murder, after his fiancée died in a car accident.

He recounted that in 1989 he was convicted in Cyprus and sentenced to three years imprisonment in the Central Jail of Nicosia, where his Buddhist upbringing did not give him much strength to endure the harsh conditions. Over six months, he was visited every week by a missionary from Northern Ireland, and converted to Christianity. They developed a friendship which continued after Anthony's release.

He was sentenced again in 2001 to 15 months in prison in the United Kingdom for perverting the course of justice and other charges. By his own version of events, his car had hit a female motorcyclist at night, killing her, but he had not stayed at the scene and later denied it to the police. The person killed was Elizabeth Bracewell, sister to footballer Paul Bracewell. Anthony's wife received a sentence of 120 hours of community service for her role in the cover-up.

Anthony set up Avanti Ministries in 2003 to support his evangelistic work (avanti is the Italian for 'forward'). The organisation received charitable status on 3 June 2004.

In 2004, Authentic Media (then part of Christian publishers Send the Light and currently owned by the Australian company Koorong) published Anthony's autobiography, Taming The Tiger. The book won the 2005 Christian Booksellers Convention award, was translated into 25 languages, and 1.5 million copies were distributed. Taming The Tiger brought Anthony to the attention of Christians worldwide, who were enthralled by the conversion of such a violent criminal. He travelled internationally to tell his story; video interviews were broadcast in Canada on 100 Huntley Street in 2005 and 2011, and in the Netherlands by Evangelische Omroep. Anthony was also the keynote speaker at the Global Day of Prayer event in London in 2010. He was a member of the Leigh Road Baptist Church.

== Investigation ==
Concerns began to be expressed about Anthony's claims to have been a Kung Fu champion and violent enforcer. Christian journalist Gavin Drake writes:

Questions were asked about the authenticity of Taming the Tiger ever since it was first published in 2004. Critics were quick to point out that it reads like a work of fiction...

Mike Hancock is credited with initiating the events that finally exposed Anthony. Hancock was appointed as a director of Avanti Ministries in December 2010, but received evasive answers when he asked for proof of Anthony's claims. Having failed to convince the other directors of the need to verify Anthony's story, he resigned in January 2012. Hancock then joined with another former director of Avanti Ministries, Geoff Elliott, who had similar concerns, Anglican church leader Carl Chambers, and prison chaplain David Buick, and together they sought to uncover the truth about Anthony. Chambers created a website documenting his research into Anthony's claims. Additional members of the group were Tony Pancaldi, Aaron Peterson and Jon Mason. Collectively, they became known as the Research Group.

In October 2012, the Research Group presented a detailed complaint to the Evangelical Alliance, an umbrella organisation of which Avanti Ministries was a member. Following discussions with the Alliance, Avanti Ministries agreed to set up an independent investigation conducted by a panel comprising three senior members of the Evangelical Alliance council. A joint press release issued by Avanti Ministries and the Evangelical Alliance on 12 July 2013 advised:

The panel produced its report on 26 June 2013 and concluded, based on the evidence submitted to it, that large sections of the book Taming the Tiger, and associated materials, which claim to tell the true story of Tony Anthony’s life, do not do so.

Avanti Ministries have refused to release the panel's report, citing confidentiality, but Gavin Drake has indicated that the Research Group challenged virtually all of Anthony's claims regarding his life prior to becoming a Christian. A comment by Steve Clifford, General Director of the Evangelical Alliance, confirmed that the information available online comprises most of the issues raised in the original complaint.

Specific aspects of Anthony's story that have been determined to be inaccurate include his birth in the early 1960s to an Italian father, his childhood in China, his training in Kung Fu and winning three world championships, and his role as a bodyguard and enforcer for international gangsters and diplomats. Drake indicated that Anthony confirmed that his real name is Andonis Andreou Athanasiou and he was born on 30 July 1971, which would make him too young to have participated in the events described in his book.

== Subsequent events ==
On 16 July 2013, the Avanti Ministries board made public their decision to close down the organisation. Authentic Media, Anthony's publisher, also announced that they were withdrawing his materials from sale.

In a statement published on his personal website, Anthony accepted that there were some errors in Taming the Tiger relating to his childhood, and claimed he was unaware of these details when the book was written. Anthony maintained that the substance of the book is true, but did not respond to the more significant allegations. The statement was reported by the Christian Today website.

On 30 August 2013, John Langlois OBE, the chair of the inquiry panel, released a letter expressing his concerns at the lack of transparency shown by Avanti Ministries. He said that a statement from Avanti Ministries was a deliberate deception and explicitly said Anthony had made false claims:

1. Tony Anthony never went to China as a child as claimed,
2. He was never involved in Kung Fu as claimed, and
3. He was never involved in Close Protection as claimed.

The inquiry's conclusion was reported in the media. The Observer describes Anthony as a serial fantasist. Christianity printed a lengthy article about the investigation and its conclusions. Anthony disputed the findings of the inquiry. Press coverage also included Anthony's local newspaper the Southend Standard, Reform magazine, and French magazine Marianne.

Following Avanti Ministries' refusal to release the report, and Anthony's trivialisation of the allegations, the Evangelical Alliance removed Avanti Ministries from membership on 19 September 2013. A few days later, Anthony's former church, Leigh Road Baptist Church, released a statement indicating that they accept the findings of the inquiry and can no longer support his ministry. They confirmed that Anthony was no longer a member of the church.

On 21 October 2013, the New Zealand Herald reported that Anthony was making a six-week visit to New Zealand, and that the NZ Christian Network, a similar organisation to the Evangelical Alliance, had issued a warning because Anthony's biography had been found to be '99 per cent false'. The national leader of the Elim Pentecostal Church in New Zealand was reported as saying that they are suspending support for Anthony pending their own investigations.

== Republication of Taming The Tiger ==
On 9 July 2015, RoperPenberthy Publishing announced that they had published a revised edition of Anthony's autobiography, Taming The Tiger, and media interest in Anthony was reawakened.

The first report was on the Christian Today website, dated 17 July 2015. It covered the earlier controversy, the republication of Taming The Tiger, and also pointed out discrepancies in a report on Anthony's website about a 2014 meeting at Royal Holloway University. The author concluded,

For the majority, the holes in his [Anthony's] story are simply too big for him to retain his credibility as an evangelical Christian witness.

Premier Media (the parent company of Premier Christian Radio) followed, with an internet article dated 22 July 2015, again covering the events of 2013 and the republication of Taming The Tiger. A day later, the Evangelical Alliance reiterated their previous statement that Anthony's claims had been found to be untrue.

== Publications ==
- Taming The Tiger, Tony Anthony with Angela Little, Authentic Lifestyle, 2004-08-01, ISBN 978-1860244810
- Passion, Tony Anthony with Angela Little, Authentic Publishing, 2010-05-07, ISBN 978-1860248047
- Cry of the Tiger, Angela Little, Authentic Media, 2008-04-01, ISBN 978-1860247088

== See also ==
- George Santos - American politician who fabricated large parts of his biography
- Mike Warnke – an American evangelist who also fabricated stories of his past
