= D.M.Z. (Resurrection Band album) =

Studio album by Resurrection Band
- Released: 1982
- Recorded: 1982
- Studio: Tone Zone Studios, Chicago, Illinois
- Genre: Christian rock
- Length: 34:02
- Label: Light
- Producer: Resurrection Band

Resurrection Band chronology
Mommy Don't Love Daddy Anymore (1981)	D.M.Z. (1982)	Live Bootleg (1984)

D.M.Z. is the fifth full-length album by American Christian rock band Resurrection Band, released in 1982. It was the band's final release for Light Records.

== Recording history ==
The album begins with one of Resurrection Band's most popular songs, "Military Man", D.M.Z. is a split personality, featuring either hard rock akin to Van Halen, or new wave-influenced mid-tempo numbers. However, long-time Resurrection Band fans consider Stu Heiss' opening 90-second feedback-drenched guitar solo to "White Noise" as one of the best moments in the band's history, and this song proved to be just as popular live.

Lyrically, the album focuses on individual stories of emotional disconnection and spiritual confusion, offering the Savior as the answer to both. For the first time, the band directly addresses the concerns of high-school age listeners in "Area 312" and "The Prisoner", a trend that would continue on future releases. Big social issues addressed on the album focus this time around on war and its destructive effects as well as the un-Christian nature of the military itself, repeated several times in "Military Man", "Babylon" and "White Noise"—hence, the inspiration for the album title.

This album was re-released on CD in 2004 by Retroactive Records.

== Track listing ==
All songs written by Glenn Kaiser unless otherwise noted

1. "Military Man" (G. Kaiser, Jon Trott, Stu Heiss, Jim Denton) – 3:38
2. "Reluctance" – 2:11
3. "Babylon" (G. Kaiser, Trott) – 2:33
4. "I Need Your Love" – 3:22
5. "Area 312" (Trott, Wendi Kaiser, Heiss, Denton) – 3:54
6. "No Alibi" – 4:39
7. "White Noise" - (Trott, Roy Montroy) – 3:41
8. "Lonely Hearts" – 3:00
9. "The Prisoner" – 2:54
10. "So in Love with You" (G. Kaiser, Trott) – 3:38

== Personnel ==
- Glenn Kaiser – vocals, guitars
- Wendi Kaiser – vocals
- Stu Heiss – guitars, keyboards
- Jim Denton – fretless bass, synthesizer, background vocals
- John Herrin – drums
- Steve Eisen – saxophone
- Resurrection Band – producer
- Roger Heiss – engineer
- Steve Hall – mastering
- MCA Whitney – mastering location
- Dick Randall – album cover concept and art
- Pat Peterson – photography
- Denise Omernick – photography
- Linda Dillon – photography
- JPUSA Graphics – other art and layout

Per album liner notes:
