= The Jelly Jam =

American band

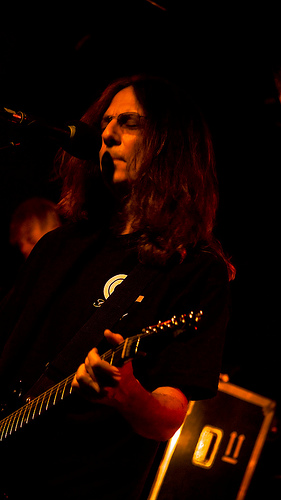

Background information
- Origin: US
- Genres: Progressive rock, jazz rock
- Years active: 2002–present
- Labels: InsideOut, Molken, Mascot
- Members: Rod Morgenstein; Ty Tabor; John Myung
- Website: thejellyjam.com

The Jelly Jam is an American progressive rock power trio supergroup, consisting of King's X member Ty Tabor on guitar and vocals, Winger and Dixie Dregs member Rod Morgenstein on drums, and Dream Theater member John Myung on bass guitar.

Their first album, The Jelly Jam, was released by InsideOut Music in 2002. Their second album, The Jelly Jam 2, followed in 2004.

== Members ==
- Ty Tabor – guitars, vocals
- John Myung – bass guitar
- Rod Morgenstein – drums, percussion

== Discography ==
- The Jelly Jam (2002)
- The Jelly Jam 2 (2004)
- Shall We Descend (2011)
- Profit (2016)
