= Cornerstone (magazine) =

Evangelical christian magazine

- Executive Editors: Dawn Mortimer; Jon Trott
- Categories: Christian arts and culture
- Frequency: Monthly
- Circulation: Worldwide
- Publisher: Cornerstone Communications LLC
- Founded: 1971
- Final issue: 2003
- Country: United States
- Based in: Chicago
- Language: English
- Website: www.cornerstonemag.com
- ISSN: 0275-2743

Cornerstone was a newspaper and later a magazine published by Jesus People USA, focusing on topics of evangelical Christian faith and engagement with politics and culture.

Cornerstone began as an 8-page black-and-white newspaper in 1971, printed at various locations by the itinerant Jesus People community. In 1973, its publication address settled permanently in Chicago, Illinois. Cornerstone quickly grew throughout the United States (and other countries) in artistic style, content, page count and circulation. The newspaper carried nearly a thousand addresses of "bulk distributors", providing an early networking vehicle for members of the Jesus movement and the Christian counterculture. The newspaper regularly focused on Jesus music and musicians. It covered Christian evidence, racism, the drug culture, conversion testimonies and stories from the Jesus People commune which published it. Subtitled "The National Jesus Paper", Cornerstone peaked in circulation at 250,000 copies by 1979, the year it changed to magazine format.

Though its press run dropped by half with the change in format, its influence and literary variety matured. Regular features were poetry, short fiction, Christian visual and performing arts, news on cults and persecuted Christians, investigative reporting, and full-color comics. The Cornerstone logo on the cover changed each issue of its existence.

The magazine received both criticism and praise for its investigative journalism of Lauren Stratford, John Todd and Mike Warnke, who had made names for themselves with stories of first-hand involvement in Satanism and Satanic ritual abuse (which turned out to be untrue).

Cornerstone magazine also spawned the Cornerstone Festival. In 2003, Cornerstone ceased publication after publishing 124 issues over thirty-two years.

== See also ==
- Jesus People USA
- Cornerstone Festival
- Mike Warnke per Cornerstone's exposé
