= Rainbow's End (album) =

Studio album by Resurrection Band
- Released: 1979
- Recorded: 1979
- Studio: Pumpkin Studios, Chicago, Illinois
- Genre: Christian rock
- Length: 36:23
- Label: Star Song
- Producer: Resurrection Band

Resurrection Band chronology
Awaiting Your Reply (1978)	Rainbow's End (1979)	Colours (1980)

Alternative cover
- Alternative cover art with the inner sleeve reversed

Professional ratings
Review scores
Source	Rating
CCM Magazine	(?)
Firestream	4/5 stars

Rainbow's End is the second full-length album by American Christian rock band Resurrection Band, released in 1979.

== Recording history ==
Resurrection Band continues in its Led Zeppelin-inspired rock vein with this record. This release is significant for the inclusion of "Afrikaans," the first anti-apartheid song ever released by an American rock band, one full year before Peter Gabriel brought the issue to listeners' attention with "Biko." Although the band was greatly pleased with this album, that sentiment was not shared by the record label, and Rainbow's End would be the band's last release for Star Song Records.

== Track listing ==
No.	Title	Writer(s)	Length
1.	"Midnight Son"	Glenn Kaiser	3:23
2.	"Strongman"	Tom Cameron, Stu Heiss, Kaiser, Jon Trott	3:18
3.	"Afrikaans"	Kaiser	3:35
4.	"Skyline"	Cameron, Jim Denton, Kaiser	3:11
5.	"Paint a Picture"	Heiss, Kaiser	4:53
6.	"Rainbow's End"	Cameron, Denton, Heiss, Kaiser, John Herrin	3:49
7.	"Concert for a Queen"	Kaiser	3:17
8.	"Sacrifice of Love"	Kaiser	3:04
9.	"The Wolfsong"	Heiss, Kaiser	3:14
10.	"Everytime It Rains"	Denton, Kaiser	4:48
Total length:			36:30

The title track was never played live until Resurrection Band's final concert at the Cornerstone Festival in 2000.

== Personnel ==
- Glenn Kaiser – lead and background vocals, electric guitars
- Wendi Kaiser – lead and background vocals
- Stu Heiss – electric and acoustic guitars, piano, organ, Moog synthesizer, "Heiss Box" guitar synthesizer
- Jim Denton – bass guitar, acoustic guitar
- John Herrin – drums
- Roger Heiss – percussion
- Tom Cameron – harmonica
- Kenny Soderblom – saxophone, recorder

Production

- Resurrection Band – producer, mixing
- Gary Loizzo – engineer
- Stu Heiss – engineer, mixing
- Roger Heiss – engineer

== Album design ==
The gatefold LP for Rainbow's End originally came in a slipcase cover with die-cut windows on either side of the angel. Depending on which side was inserted, the windows revealed either heavenly clouds, or stained-glass windows.
