= Lament (Resurrection Band album) =

Studio album by Resurrection Band
- Released: 1995
- Recorded: Tone Zone Studios, Chicago, Illinois, 1995
- Genre: Christian rock
- Length: 48:31
- Label: Grrr
- Producer: Ty Tabor

Resurrection Band chronology
The Light Years (1995)	Lament (1995)	Ampendectomy (1997)

Professional ratings
Review scores
Source	Rating
AllMusic	=
Cross Rhythms	9/10 stars
Firestream	4.5/5 stars

Lament is the twelfth and last studio album of original material, from American Christian rock band Resurrection Band, released in 1995. The band also reverted to their original moniker with this album.

== Recording history ==
Concerned that they had fallen into a rut musically, Resurrection Band decided to reach outside the band for inspiration, finding it in producer Ty Tabor, guitarist and co-lead vocalist for the band King's X. However, the most radical departure from prior releases was not so much the style of music—the blues-based hard rock of latter-period REZ is still here in evidence—but the approach to the material. Lament is the band's first concept album, a song cycle about one man's disillusionment with the harshness and cruelty of life and his eventual realization that things will not change without his own spiritual redemption. As the band's final album of original material, it is a fitting swan song, given that Resurrection Band's entire reason for existence was to inspire listeners to seriously consider their own spiritual condition and their need for a Savior.

Recognizing the importance of how the songs are ordered, Resurrection Band played the entire album from beginning to end on the tour which supported this album, which was rare enough in rock music—save for The Who, Pink Floyd, Iron Maiden and Styx—and unheard of in Christian rock. As a result, the creative rebirth of Lament was highly praised among long-time fans of Resurrection Band as well as prominent Christian music critics, with some calling the album the finest the band ever recorded.

== Track listing ==
No.	Title	Writer(s)	Length
1.	"Parting Glance"	Glenn Kaiser	1:10
2.	"Across These Fields"	Kaiser, Roy Montroy	4:20
3.	"On the Move"	Kaiser, Montroy	2:09
4.	"Summerthrow"	Dave Canfield, Montroy	4:12
5.	"At Land's End"	Kaiser	4:08
6.	"Song and Dance"	Kaiser, Canfield, Montroy	4:46
7.	"In Change"	Kaiser	3:15
8.	"The Road"	Kaiser, Tom Cameron, Montroy	3:49
9.	"Dark Carnival"	Canfield, Montroy	2:54
10.	"Mirror"	Kaiser, Montroy	3:57
11.	"Another Look"		0:35
12.	"Surprised"	Kaiser, Montroy	5:23
13.	"Richest One"	Kaiser	4:07
14.	"Across These Fields Reprise"	Kaiser	3:39
Total length:			48:31

== Personnel ==
- Glenn Kaiser – acoustic and electric guitars, dulcimer, harmonica, lead and background vocals
- Wendi Kaiser – lead and background vocals
- Stu Heiss – electric and acoustic guitars, keyboards
- Roy Montroy – bass guitar, background vocals
- John Herrin – drums
- Roger Heiss – percussion
- Ed Bialach – percussion
- Ty Tabor – lead guitar, acoustic guitar, producer, engineer
- Chris Cameron – organ
- Hilde Bialach – cello
- Julie M. Andrews – background vocals
- Diane Borden – background vocals
- Eric Clayton – pan pipes
- Colleen Davick – background vocals
- Shelli Friede – background vocals
- Chris Garno – background vocals
- Micky Griffin – background vocals
- Bonnie Groth – background vocals
- Laurel Heiss – background vocals
- Lottie Jones – background vocals
- Caryl Montroy – background vocals
- Andrea Spicer – background vocals

Additional production'

- Tom Cameron – executive producer
- Brian Garcia – engineer
- Roger Heiss – engineer
- Ed Bialach – assistant to engineer
- Marty Phillips – assistant to engineer
