= Innocent Blood (album) =

Studio album by REZ
- Released: 1989
- Recorded: 1989
- Studios: Tone Zone Studios, Chicago, Illinois
- Genre: Christian rock
- Length: 46:46
- Label: Grrr
- Producers: Rez, Tom Cameron

REZ chronology
REZ: Compact Favorites (1988)	Innocent Blood (1989)	Civil Rites (1991)

Innocent Blood is the tenth studio album, by American Christian rock band Resurrection Band (known at this point as "Rez"), released in 1989.

== Background ==
The hard rock on Innocent Blood is even more blues-based than Rez's previous outing, as evidenced by "Child of the Blues", "Great God in Heaven", and the brief opening track, "Rooster Crow", an acoustic blues number which would be fleshed out into a complete song many years later for the Glenn Kaiser Band's 2001 album, Carolina Moon. The remainder of the album edges closer to heavy metal, as evidenced by "Altar of Pain" and "80,000 Underground". The band also covers the song "Bargain", originally recorded by The Who, which became a No. 1 hit on Christian rock radio. In addition, "Where Roses Grow" became a concert favorite among long-time Rez fans.

Given the blues-oriented musical direction of Innocent Blood, the lyrics concern themselves primarily with issues of poverty ("Child of the Blues"), slavery ("80,000 Underground") the Devil ("Fiend or Foul") and the hope of Heaven ("Where Roses Grow"). However, in a contemporary twist, REZ also turns a critical eye toward American culture's obsession with youth in "Altar of Pain."

== Track listing ==
1. "Rooster Crow" – 0:48
2. "Altar of Pain" – 3:15
3. "The House Is On Fire" – 3:25
4. "80,000 Underground" – 3:14
5. "Fiend or Foul" – 4:41
6. "Where Roses Grow" – 7:20
7. "Right On Time" – 5:46
8. "Child of the Blues" – 3:40
9. "Laughing Man" – 3:31
10. "Bargain" – 5:31
11. "Great God in Heaven" – 2:56

== Personnel ==
- Glenn Kaiser – vocals, guitars, harmonica
- Wendi Kaiser – vocals
- Stu Heiss – lead guitar, keyboards
- Roy Montroy – bass guitar, keyboards
- John Herrin – drums

Production

- Rez – producer
- Tom Cameron – producer
- Ed Bialach – engineer
- Roy Montroy – engineer
- Roger Heiss – engineer
- Steve Hall – mastering
