= Cornerstone Festival =

American Christian music festival

Coordinates: 40°31′53.00″N 90°26′12.00″W

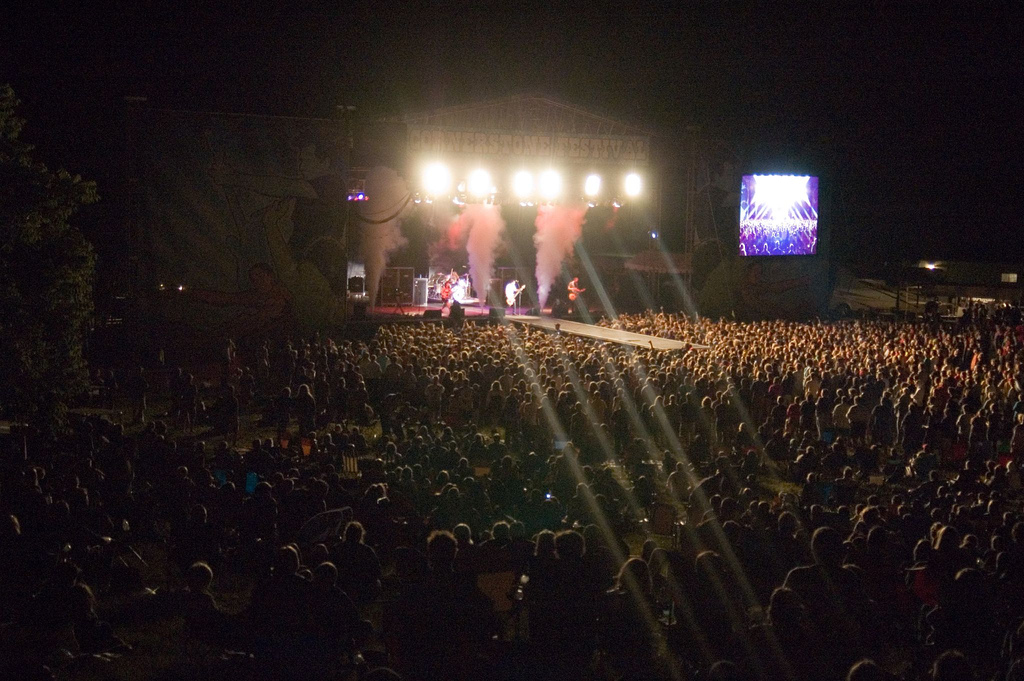
- The Main Stage of Cornerstone.
- Genre: CCM, rock, metal, punk, pop, rap, folk, electronic, Celtic, country, hardcore
- Locations: Grayslake, Illinois (1984–1990); Bushnell, Illinois (1990–2012)
- Years active: 1984–2012
- Founders: Jesus People USA
- Website: www.cornerstonefestival.com

Cornerstone Festival was a Christian music festival put on by Jesus People USA and held annually around July 4 near Bushnell, Illinois, drawing some 20,000 attendees each year. In a given year, many artists that played at Cornerstone also played at other events such as Creation Festival and mainstream festivals and tours such as the Warped Tour. The final festival was held in 2012.

Cornerstone Festival was a member of the Christian Festival Association.

== History ==
From 1984 to 1990, Cornerstone was held at the Lake County Fairgrounds near Grayslake, Illinois. In 1991, Cornerstone moved near the town of Bushnell (outside Macomb) where the organizers of the festival purchased a large piece of land, which was called "Cornerstone Farm" until it sle to a new owner.

Tens of thousands of people attended Cornerstone Farm each year and saw over 300 bands play many styles of music, including rock, metal, punk, hardcore and pop music. In addition to the many musicians, Cornerstone Festival also presented guest speakers, and featured independent/foreign film screenings, writers' seminars, and art workshops.

In 2010 the festival's main stage moved to the "Midway", which is about 0.7 miles northeast of its previous location in the "bowl".

The 2011 festival featured a Jesus Rally showcasing many of the groundbreaking Jesus music artists including; Servant, Daniel Amos, Randy Stonehill, Barry McGuire, Resurrection Band, Phil Keaggy, and Classic Petra.

On May 15, 2012 it was announced that the 2012 Festival would be the last. The final song performed at Cornerstone, on July 7, 2012, was "To Bid Farewell" performed by Derri Daugherty and Steve Hindalong of The Choir.

The festival ceased due to budgetary reasons.

== Books ==
- Young, Shawn David, "Hippies, Jesus Freaks, and Music" (Ann Arbor: Xanedu/Copley Original Works, 2005). ISBN 1-59399-201-7
