= Awaiting Your Reply =

Studio album by Resurrection Band
- Released: 1978
- Recorded: 1978
- Studio: Hedden West Studios, Schaumburg, Illinois
- Genre: Christian rock
- Length: 39:04
- Label: Star Song
- Producer: Resurrection Band

Resurrection Band chronology
| Demos (1976) | Awaiting Your Reply (1978) | Rainbow's End (1979) |

Professional ratings
Review scores
| Source | Rating |
|---|---|
| AllMusic | 5/5 stars |

Awaiting Your Reply is the debut album by American Christian rock band Resurrection Band, released in 1978.

== Recording history ==
The album was recorded for only $8000 US over a period of two weeks in marathon all-night sessions ending on Easter Sunday morning. A groundbreaking release by Christian music standards at the time, the album caused considerable controversy among Christian music critics, many of whom found fault with controversial themes and its heavy rock sounds, which are clearly influenced by Led Zeppelin. No Christian record label in the United States or Great Britain would agree to distribute the album. The independent label, Star Song Records finally signed Resurrection Band to a record deal. The label soon became one of the largest independents in contemporary Christian music. Many Christian bookstores sold the album from behind the counter, as the cover art was considered too controversial to display openly.

Awaiting Your Reply along with its follow-up, Rainbow's End, quickly solidified Resurrection Band's place in the upper echelon of Christian rock music due to the band's socially conscious Christian lyrics and solid musicianship. In 2001, the album was listed at No. 91 in the book, CCM Presents: The 100 Greatest Albums in Christian Music.

== Track listing ==
All songs written by Glenn Kaiser unless otherwise noted.

1. "Introduction" / "Waves" – 3:36
2. "Awaiting Your Reply" – 4:06
3. "Broken Promises" – 6:56
4. "Golden Road" (Glenn Kaiser, Jon Trott) – 4:56
5. "Lightshine" – 5:20
6. "Ananias and Sapphira" (Jim Denton) – 2:50
7. "Death of the Dying" – 3:18
8. "Irish Garden" – 4:52
9. "The Return" / "Tag" – 3:57

== Personnel ==
- Glenn Kaiser – lead vocals, rhythm and lead guitars, dulcimer
- Wendi Kaiser – lead vocals
- Stu Heiss – lead guitar, piano, Moog Mark II, ARP Odyssey, Omni, Avatar
- Jim Denton – bass guitar, acoustic guitar, vocals, lead vocal on "Ananias and Sapphira"
- John Herrin – drums
- Tom Cameron – harmonica
- Roger Heiss – percussion
- Kenny Soderblom – saxophone, flute

Production

- Resurrection Band – producer, mixing
- Mal Davis – engineer
- Stu Heiss – engineer, mixing
- Ken Perry – mastering
- Capitol Studios, Los Angeles – mastering location
- JPUSA Graphics – art direction and design
- Janet Cameron – cover art, inside art and layout
- Dick Randall – inside art and layout
- Bob Cox – inside art and layout
- Lyda Price – inside art and layout
- Chuck Cairo – photography
