= Jesus People USA =

Christian intentional community in Chicago

- Formation: 1972
- Type: Christian
- Location: Chicago, Illinois
- Official language: English
- Website: jesuspeoplechicago.org

Jesus People USA (JPUSA) is a Christian commune in Chicago affiliated with the Evangelical Covenant Church. Founded in 1972, it has been described by sociologist Shawn David Young as a surviving expression of the Jesus movement and of countercultural evangelicalism. The community produced Cornerstone magazine and organized the Cornerstone Festival.

JPUSA has been the subject of controversy over allegations of authoritarian practices and abuse. Ronald Enroth's 1994 book Recovering from Churches That Abuse included accounts from former members alleging abuse within the community, and a 2001 Chicago Tribune series reported allegations by former members of authoritarian practices. JPUSA leaders disputed Enroth's findings, while JPUSA responded that the Tribune coverage exhibited anti-religious bias and cultural intolerance. In 2014, a lawsuit alleged that children had been sexually abused by JPUSA members and that its leadership had covered up the abuse; the case was dismissed for want of prosecution in 2015. In 2023, JPUSA issued a public apology to people who had been harmed in the community.

== Background ==
Jesus People USA was described in 1999 as being "one of the largest single-site communes in the United States". In 2005, it was one of only a few communes with an eclectic cultural mix of hippies, punks, "crusties" and other members from various subcultures. The JPUSA community produced Cornerstone magazine in 1971–2003. JPUSA put on and ran Cornerstone festival in 1984–2012. "Many members of JPUSA come as artists, photographers and musicians".

JPUSA's social significance has been described as stemming from the group's continued presence in Chicago and its historic roots in the 1960s, according to sociologist Shawn David Young, and as one of the most significant of contemporary groups from the Jesus movement era:

Founded in 1972, this community is one of the most significant surviving expressions of the original Jesus Movement of the sixties and seventies and represents a radical expression of contemporary countercultural evangelicalism. JPUSA's blend of Christian Socialism, theological orthodoxy, postmodern theory and ethos of edgy artistic expression (as demonstrated at their annual music festival) prove what some scholars have longed suspected: evangelicalism is a diverse, complex movement, which simply does not yield to any attempt at categorization.

== Controversy ==
=== Enroth controversy ===
As described by the Chicago Tribune in a 2001 longform article, JPUSA elders learned that Ronald Enroth was researching a sequel to his book Churches That Abuse, which was said to mention issues of abuse within JPUSA. Despite efforts of elders to convince Enroth to edit JPUSA out of the book, it was published in 1994 and included a full chapter of accounts of alleged abuse within the group.

As the Tribune reports, the release of the book

set off a firestorm of debate among religious scholars. Dozens, like Ruth Tucker, a professor at Trinity Evangelical Divinity School in Deerfield, would defend [JPUSA] vehemently, saying Enroth was "sadly misdirected and his research methods seriously flawed." Others, like Paul Martin, the director of Wellspring Retreat and Resource Center, one of the few residential treatment centers in the world for former members of "abusive groups," would support Enroth's findings, saying that his facility had been getting a flood of requests for help from former members and that the commune "displays virtually every sign that I watch for in overly authoritarian and totalistic groups."

Ronald Enroth responded to JPUSA's attempt, through their earlier correspondence, to influence his work, stating in the book:

There has been much correspondence between leaders of the Covenant Church and JPUSA and me since I began to do the research for this book. They have questioned the integrity of my reports, the reliability of my respondents, and my sociological methodology, but I have conducted more than seventy hours of in-depth interviews and telephone conversations with more than forty former members of JPUSA. They have also largely discounted the reports of abusive conditions past and present in the JPUSA community. ... Unwilling to admit serious deficiencies and insensitivity in their pastoral style, the leaders of JPUSA have instead sought to discredit the former members who have cooperated with my research efforts.

As the Chicago Tribune notes in the same article, the leaders of JPUSA "would come to believe the book was 'poison in the well.'" In the second part of the Tribune series on the group, Kirsten Scharnberg reports that as a result of the book's description of JPUSA, scores of members decided to leave the group.

=== Chicago Tribune criticism ===
In 2001, the Chicago Tribune published a two-part article primarily critical of the movement, with quotes from several ex-members accusing the group of authoritarian practices. One of the JPUSA activities criticized in the article includes "adult spankings," employed after charismatic leader Jack Winters introduced it as a means to heal the "inner child." The practice, which lasted approximately four years in the mid-1970s, was abandoned by the group, with leaders citing it as reflective of how "spiritually immature" the group was at the time.

JPUSA issued a response to the two-part article, found on their website, which accuses the article of "anti-religious bias and cultural intolerance."

=== Accusations of sexual abuse ===
A lawsuit was filed in January 2014 against JPUSA and its parent denomination, the Evangelical Covenant Church, claiming that children were sexually abused by members of JPUSA and its leadership covered it up for years. As of March 3, 2015, the court case had been dismissed for want of prosecution. That same year, the documentary No Place to Call Home shared the stories of former children of JPUSA members who allegedly were sexually abused. Over 70 former members reached out to documentary filmmakers regarding abuse or assault that occurred during their time with the organization. according to the ECC, child safety policies were implemented and legal claims were settled by 2019 In March of 2023, Jesus People released a public statement to those harmed in community. The statement includes an apology for the harms committed and also dismissive reactions by some at hearing stories. LOVE SONG: No Place To Call Home | Ten Years Later was uploaded in February 2024. This follow up documentary includes additional interviews, reflections on the legal process, and calls for restorative justice and healing. This description also linked to an open letter demanding urgency and transparency in the accountability process.
