= Best of King's X =

Compilation album by King's X
- Released: November 11, 1997
- Recorded: 1987–1997
- Genres: Hard rock, progressive metal
- Length: 73:37
- Label: Atlantic
- Producer: Various

King's X chronology
Ear Candy (1996)	Best of King's X (1997)	Tape Head (1998)

Professional ratings
Review scores
Source	Rating
AllMusic	4/5 stars
Collector's Guide to Heavy Metal	8/10
The Phantom Tollbooth link	(n/a)

Best of King's X is a compilation album by American rock band King's X. The songs on this compilation, spanning a decade of discography, were selected by fans in an online poll.

== Track listing ==
1. "King" – 3:04*
2. "Goldilox" – 4:43*
3. "Summerland" – 3:18*
4. "Pleiades" – 4:41*
5. "It's Love" – 4:37*
6. "Mr. Wilson" – 3:39*
7. "Black Flag" – 4:01*
8. "Lost in Germany" – 4:52*
9. "Dogman" – 4:02
10. "Cigarettes" – 5:52
11. "The Train" – 3:07
12. "Looking for Love" – 2:59
13. "Life Going By" – 4:05
14. "Sally" New studio track – 3:58**
15. "April Showers" New studio track – 4:10**
16. "Lover" New studio track – 2:25**
17. "Over My Head" (Live) – 10:04***

All songs written by Doug Pinnick, Ty Tabor and Jerry Gaskill, except:

- "Pleiades" written by Pinnick, Tabor, Gaskill and Dale Richardson:
- "Black Flag" and "Lost in Germany" written by Pinnick, Tabor, Gaskill and Sam Taylor.

* Remastered by Ty Tabor at Alien Beans Studios, Katy, Texas.

** Produced by Ty Tabor and King's X. Recorded by Ty Tabor at King's X Rehearsal Studios, 1996. Mixed by Ty Tabor at Alien Beans Studios, Katy, Texas.

*** Recorded live at Woodstock 1994, August 12, 1994.

== Credits ==
- Doug Pinnick – bass, lead vocals
- Ty Tabor – guitars, backing vocals
- Jerry Gaskill – drums, backing vocals
