= Ostinato =

Motif or phrase repeated throughout a piece of music

In music, an ostinato (Italian: [ostiˈnaːto]; from Italian 'stubborn', compare English obstinate) is a motif or phrase that persistently repeats in the same musical voice, frequently in the same pitch.

Both ostinatos and ostinati are accepted English plural forms, the latter reflecting the word's Italian etymology.

Well-known ostinato-based pieces include classical compositions such as Ravel's Boléro and the Carol of the Bells, and popular songs such as John Lennon's "Mind Games" (1973), Donna Summer and Giorgio Moroder's "I Feel Love" (1977), Henry Mancini's theme from Peter Gunn (1959), The Who's "Baba O'Riley" (1971), The Verve's "Bitter Sweet Symphony" (1997), and Flo Rida's "Low" (2007).

The repeating idea may be a rhythmic pattern, part of a tune, or a complete melody in itself. Strictly speaking, ostinati should have exact repetition, but in common usage, the term covers repetition with variation and development, such as the alteration of an ostinato line to fit changing harmonies or keys.

If the cadence may be regarded as the cradle of tonality, the ostinato patterns can be considered the playground in which it grew strong and self-confident.

— Edward Lowinsky

Within the context of European classical and film music, Claudia Gorbman defines an ostinato as a repeated melodic or rhythmic figure that propels scenes that lack dynamic visual action.

Ostinati play an important part in improvised music (rock and jazz), in which they are often referred to as riffs or vamps. A "favorite technique of contemporary jazz writers", ostinati are often used in modal and Latin jazz and traditional African music including Gnawa music.

The term ostinato essentially has the same meaning as the medieval Latin word pes, the word ground as applied to classical music, and the word riff in contemporary popular music.

== European classical music ==
Within the domain of European classical music traditions, Ostinati are used in 20th-century music to stabilize groups of pitches, as in Stravinsky's The Rite of Spring Introduction and Augurs of Spring. A famous type of ostinato, called the Rossini crescendo, owes its name to a crescendo that underlies a persistent musical pattern, which usually culminates in a solo vocal cadenza. This style was emulated by other bel canto composers, especially Vincenzo Bellini; and later by Wagner (in pure instrumental terms, discarding the closing vocal cadenza).

Applicable in homophonic and contrapuntal textures, they are "repetitive rhythmic-harmonic schemes", more familiar as accompanimental melodies, or purely rhythmic. The technique's appeal to composers from Debussy to avant-garde composers until at least the 1970s "... lies in part in the need for unity created by the virtual abandonment of functional chord progressions to shape phrases and define tonality". Similarly, in modal music, "... relentless, repetitive character help to establish and confirm the modal center". Their popularity may also be justified by their ease as well as range of use, though, "... ostinato must be employed judiciously, as its overuse can quickly lead to monotony".

=== Medieval ===
Ostinato patterns have been present in European music from the Middle Ages onwards. In the famous English canon "Sumer Is Icumen In", the main vocal lines are underpinned by an ostinato pattern, known as a pes:

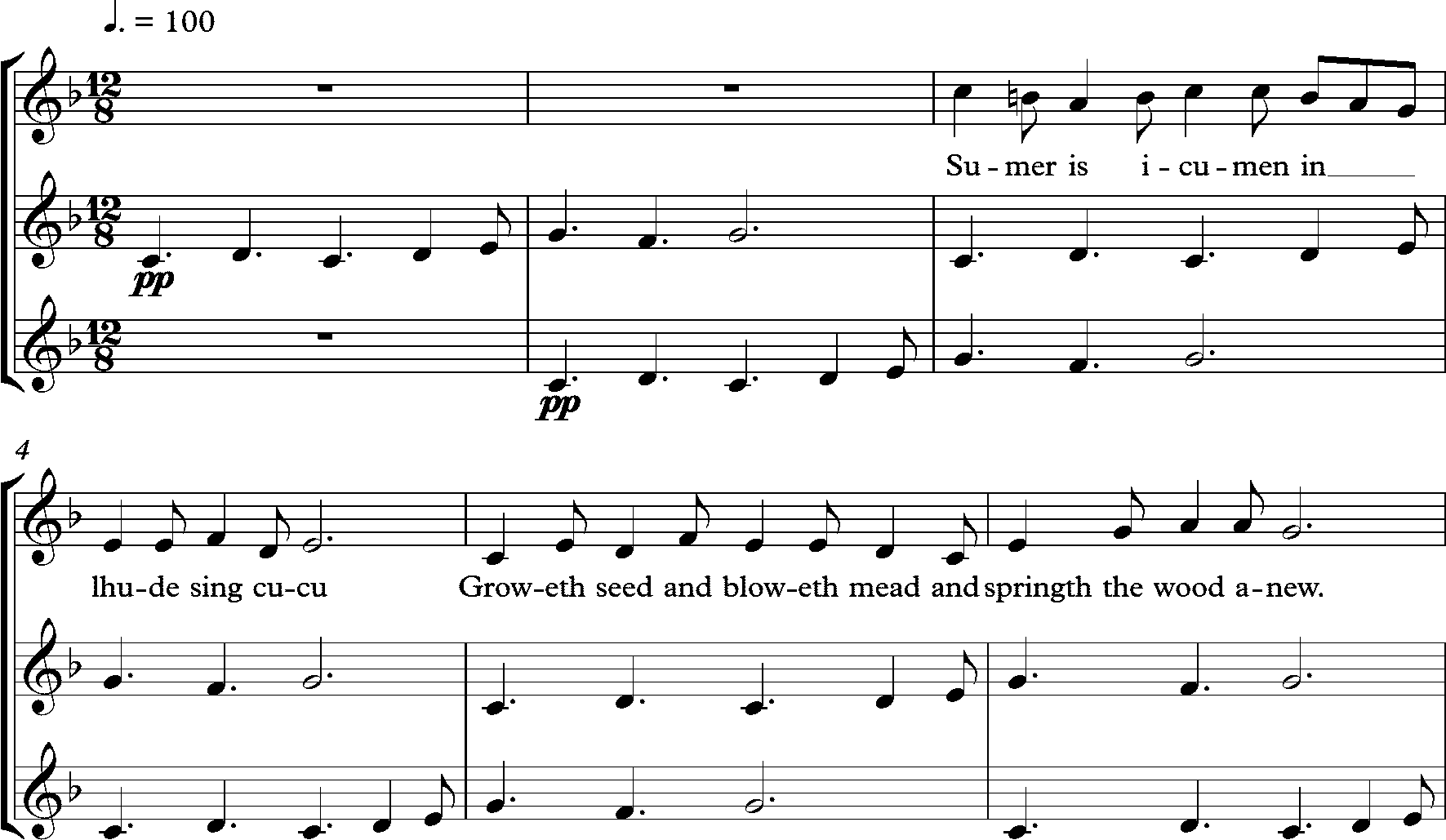
Sumer is Icumen in

Later in the medieval era, Guillaume Dufay's 15th-century chanson Resvelons Nous features a similarly constructed ostinato pattern, but this time 5 bars long. Over this, the main melodic line moves freely, varying the phrase-lengths, while being "to some extent predetermined by the repeating pattern of the canon in the lower two voices."

Dufay Resvelons nous

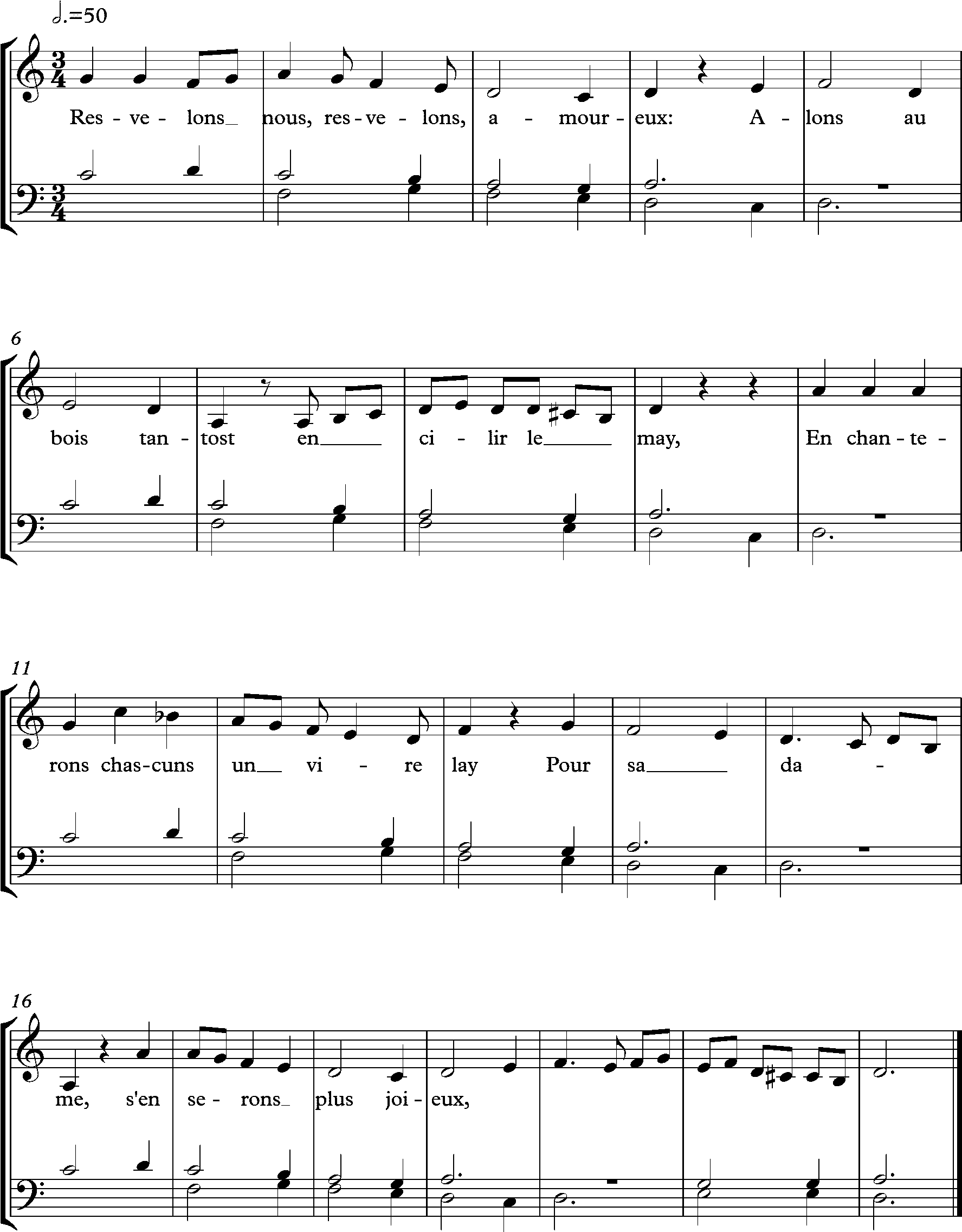
Dufay Resvelons nous

=== Ground bass: Late Renaissance and Baroque ===
Ground bass or basso ostinato (obstinate bass) is a type of variation form in which a bass line, or harmonic pattern (see Chaconne; also common in Elizabethan England as Grounde) is repeated as the basis of a piece underneath variations. Aaron Copland describes basso ostinato as "... the easiest to recognize" of the variation forms wherein, "... a long phrase—either an accompanimental figure or an actual melody—is repeated over and over again in the bass part, while the upper parts proceed normally [with variation]". However, he cautions, "it might more properly be termed a musical device than a musical form."

One striking ostinato instrumental piece of the late Renaissance period is "The Bells", a piece for virginals by William Byrd. Here the ostinato (or 'ground') consists of just two notes:

William Byrd, The Bells

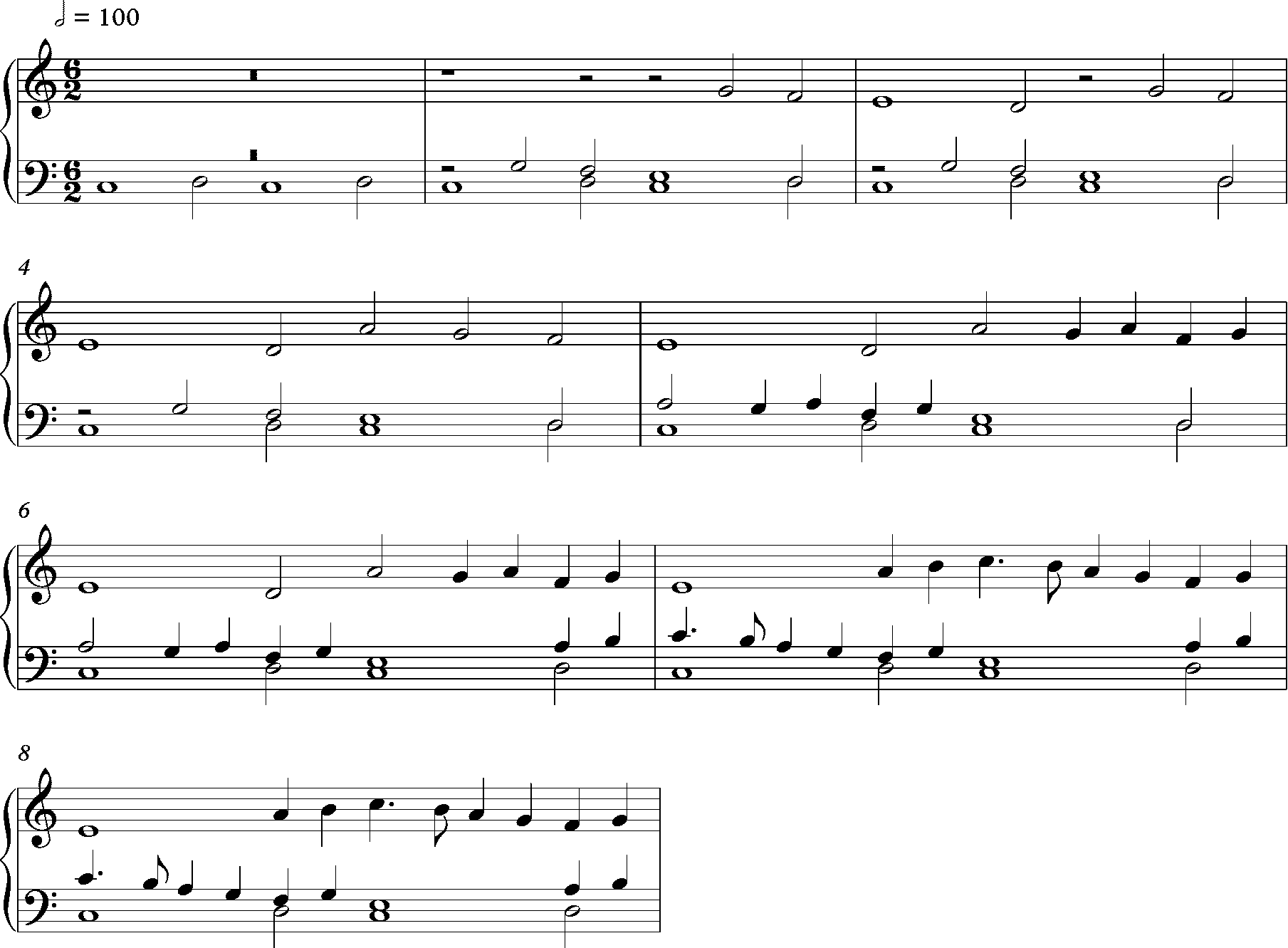
William Byrd, The Bells

In Italy, during the seventeenth century, Claudio Monteverdi composed many pieces using ostinato patterns in his operas and sacred works. One of these was his 1650 version of "Laetatus sum", an imposing setting of Psalm 122 that pits a four-note "ostinato of unquenchable energy." against both voices and instruments:

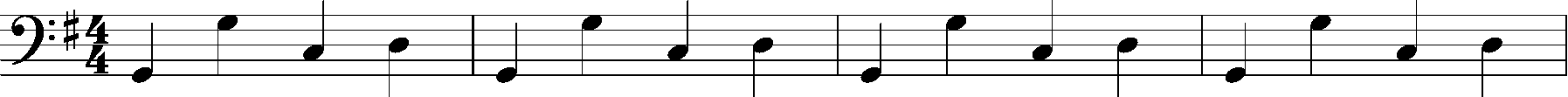
Monteverdi Laetatus sum (1650) Ground bass

Later in the same century, Henry Purcell became famous for his skilful deployment of ground bass patterns. His most famous ostinato is the descending chromatic ground bass that underpins the aria "When I am laid in earth" ("Dido's Lament") at the end of his opera Dido and Aeneas:

Purcell, Dido's Lament ground bass

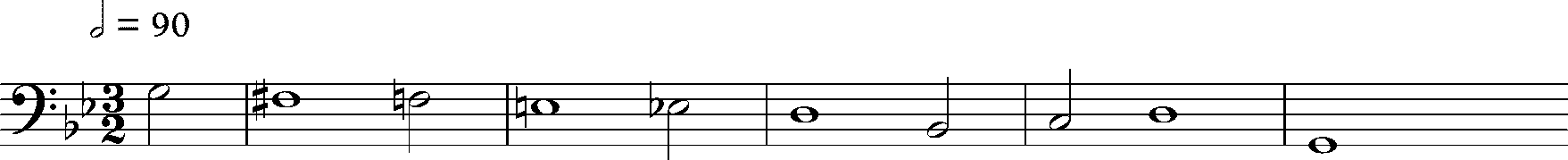
Purcell, Dido's Lament ground bass

While the use of a descending chromatic scale to express pathos was fairly common at the end of the seventeenth century, Richard Taruskin pointed out that Purcell shows a fresh approach to this musical trope: "Altogether unconventional and characteristic, however, is the interpolation of an additional cadential measure into the stereotyped ground, increasing its length from a routine four to a haunting five bars, against which the vocal line, with its despondent refrain ("Remember me!"), is deployed with marked asymmetry. That, in addition to Purcell's distinctively dissonant, suspension-saturated harmony, enhanced by additional chromatic descents during the final ritornello and by many deceptive cadences, makes this little aria an unforgettably poignant embodiment of heartache." See also: Lament bass. However, this is not the only ostinato pattern that Purcell uses in the opera. Dido's opening aria "Ah, Belinda" is a further demonstration of Purcell's technical mastery: the phrases of the vocal line do not always coincide with the four-bar ground:

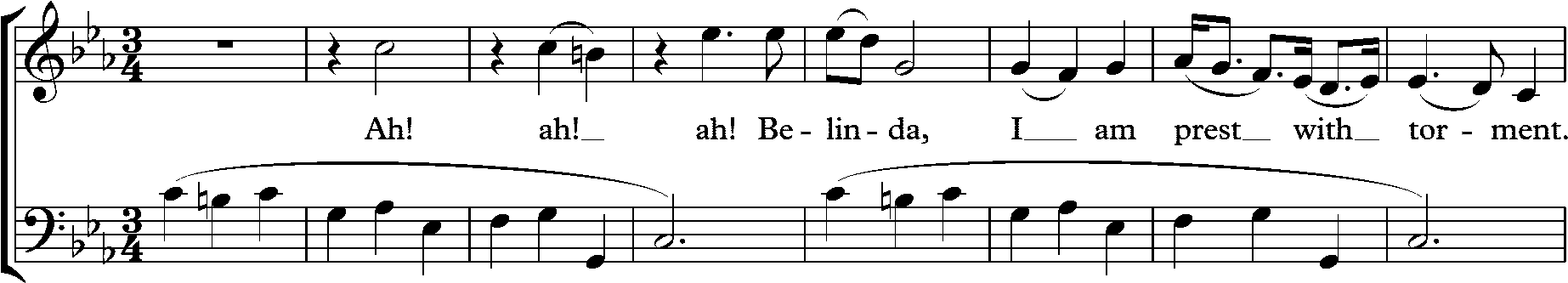
Dido's opening aria "Ah! Belinda"

"Purcell's compositions over a ground vary in their working out, and the repetition never becomes a restriction." Purcell's instrumental music also featured ground patterns. A particularly fine and complex example is his Fantasia upon a Ground for three violins and continuo:

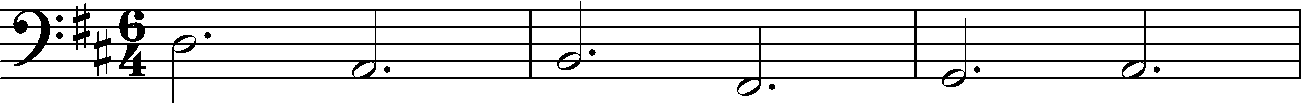
Purcell Fantasia in 3 parts to a ground

The intervals in the above pattern are found in many works of the Baroque Period. Pachelbel's Canon also uses a similar sequence of notes in the bass part:

Pachelbel's Canon

Ground bass of Pachelbel's Canon

Two pieces by J.S.Bach are particularly striking for their use of an ostinato bass: the Crucifixus from his Mass in B minor and the Passacaglia in C minor for organ, which has a ground rich in melodic intervals:

Bach C minor Passacaglia ground bass

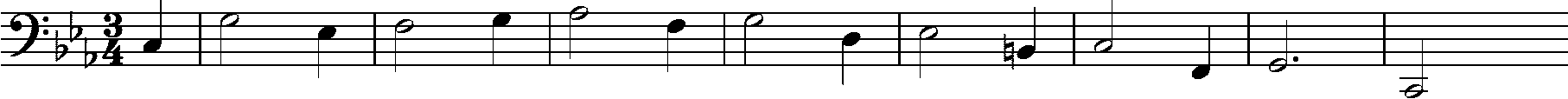
Bach C minor Passacaglia ground bass

The first variation that Bach builds over this ostinato consists of a gently syncopated motif in the upper voices:

Bach C minor Passacaglia Variation 1

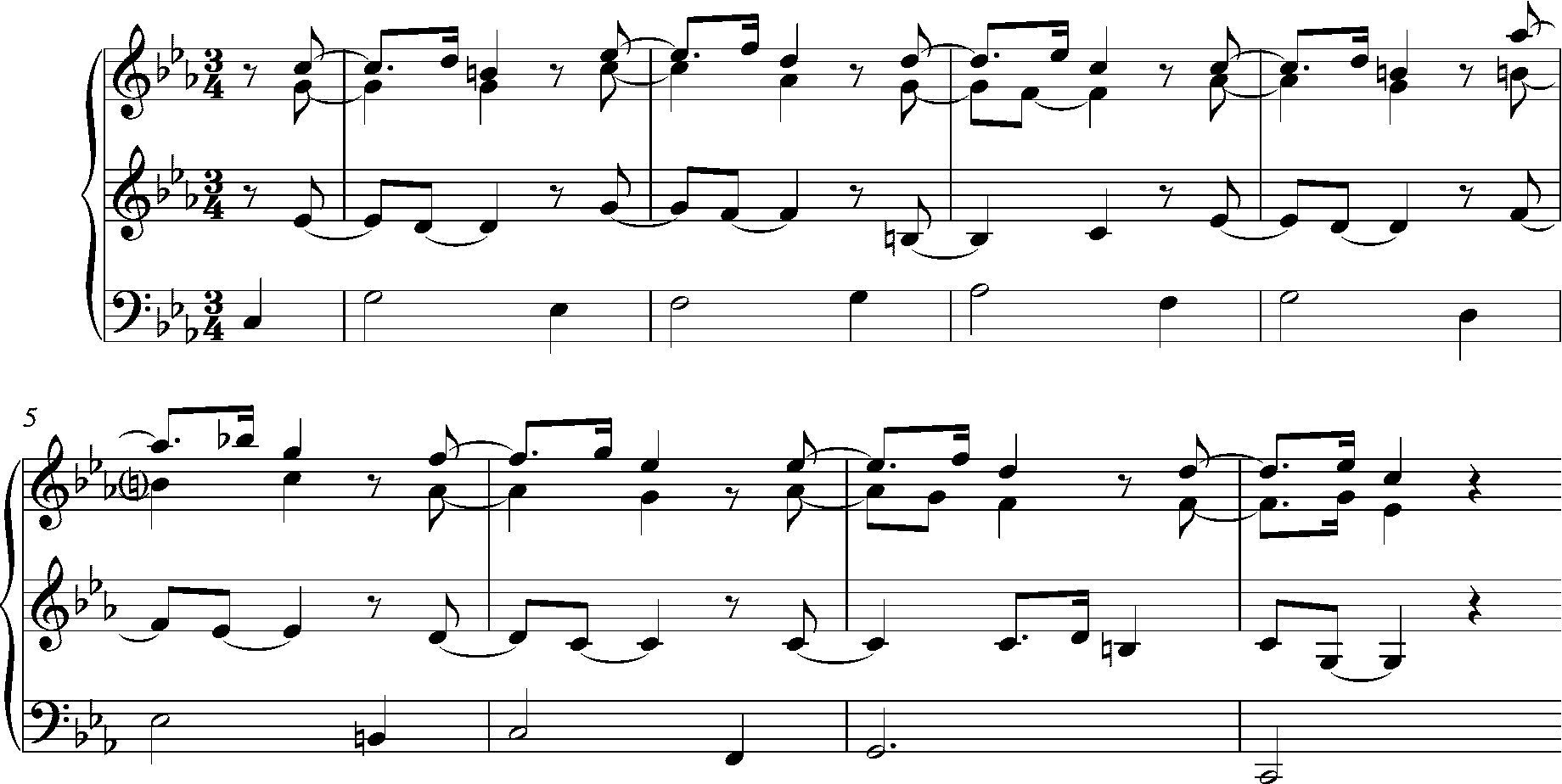
Bach C minor Passacaglia Variation 1

This characteristic rhythmic pattern continues in the second variation, but with some engaging harmonic subtleties, especially in the second bar, where an unexpected chord creates a passing implication of a related key:

Bach C minor Passacaglia Variation 2

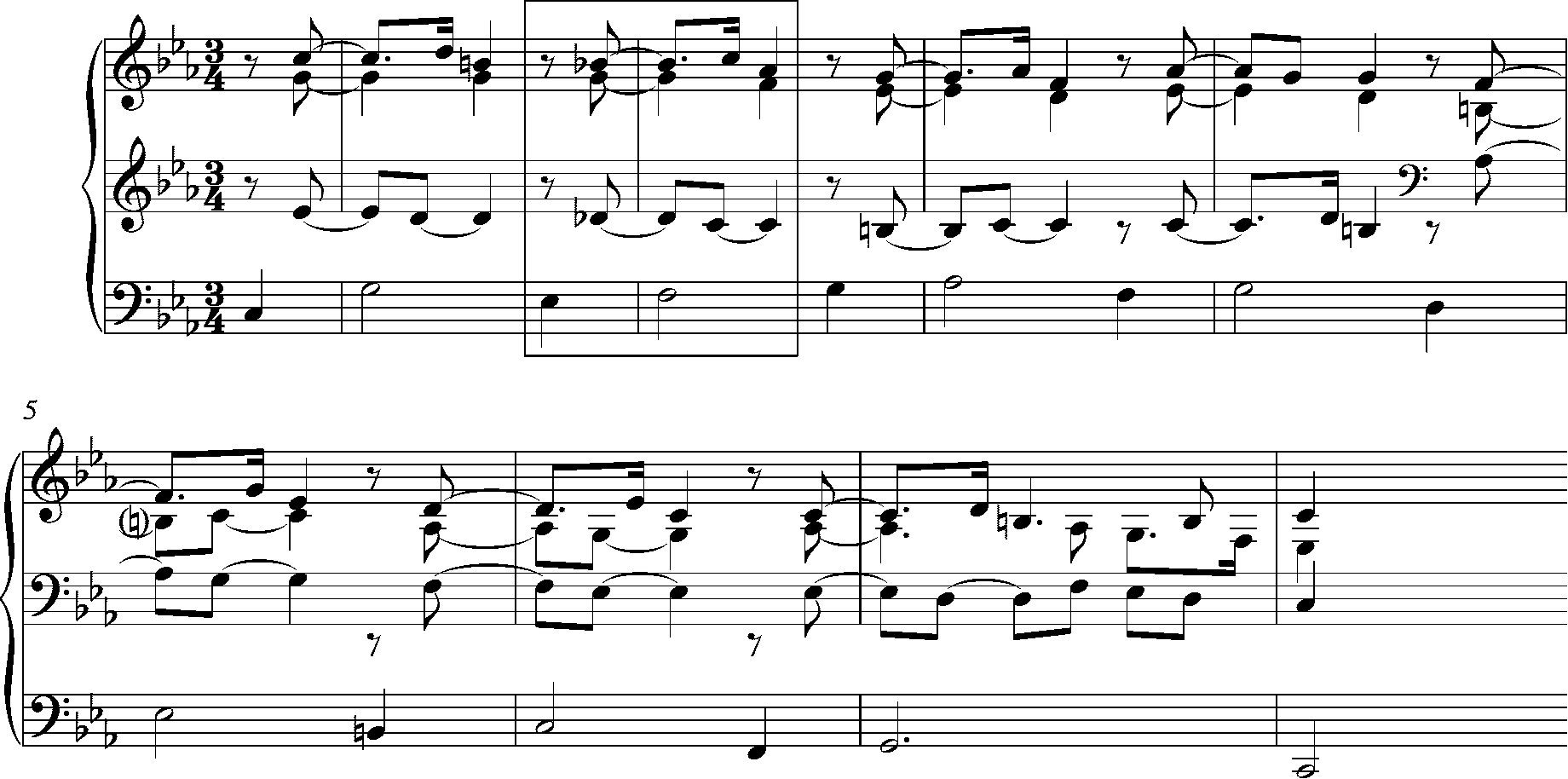
Bach C minor Passacaglia Variation 2

In common with other Passacaglias of the era, the ostinato is not simply confined to the bass, but rises to the uppermost part later in the piece:

Bach C minor Passacaglia variation with ostinato in treble

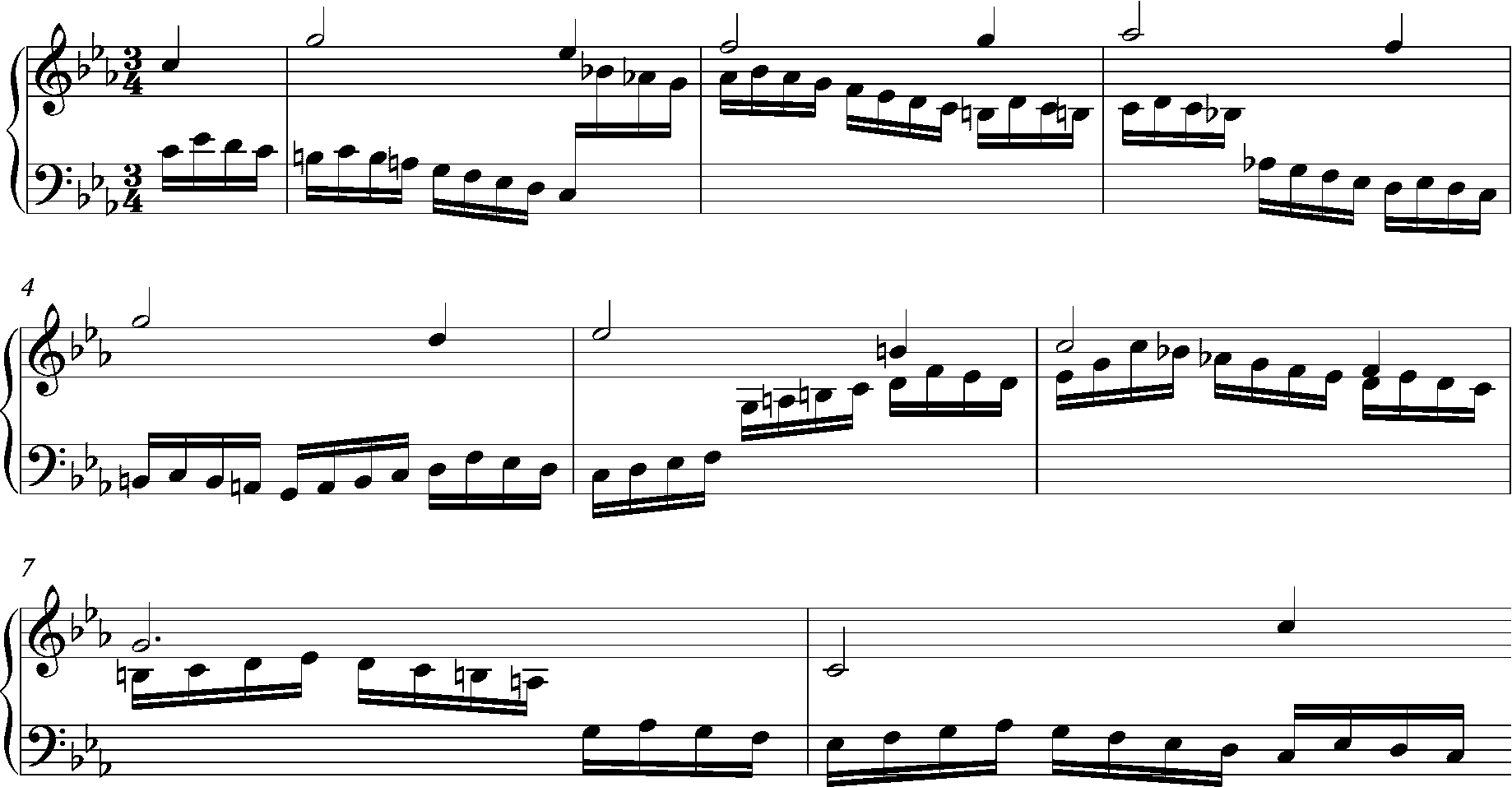
Bach C minor Passacaglia with ostinato in treble

A performance of the entire piece can be heard here.

=== Late eighteenth and nineteenth centuries ===
Ostinatos feature in many works of the late 18th and early 19th centuries. Mozart uses an ostinato phrase throughout the big scene that ends Act 2 of the Marriage of Figaro, to convey a sense of suspense as the jealous Count Almaviva tries in vain to incriminate the Countess, his wife, and Figaro, his butler, for plotting behind his back. A famous type of ostinato, called the Rossini crescendo, owes its name to a crescendo that underlies a persistent musical pattern, which usually culminates in a solo vocal cadenza.

In the energetic Scherzo of Beethoven’s late C sharp minor Quartet, Op. 131, there is a harmonically static passage, with "the repetitiveness of a nursery rhyme" that consists of an ostinato shared between viola and cello supporting a melody in octaves in the first and second violins:

Beethoven Op 131 Trio from Scherzo, bars 69–76

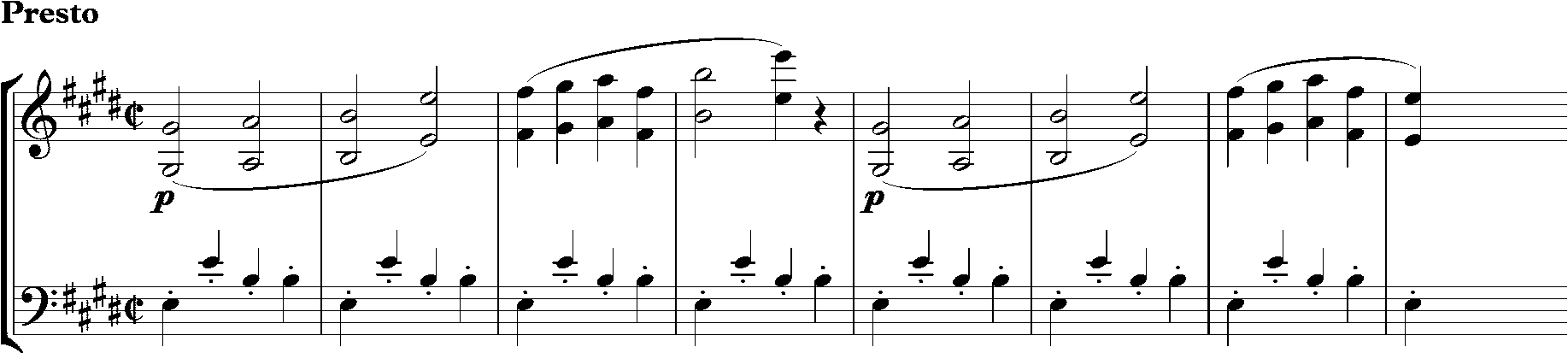
Beethoven Op 131 Trio from Scherzo, bars 69–76

Beethoven reverses this relationship a few bars later with the melody in the viola and cello and the ostinato shared between the violins:

Beethoven Op 131 Trio from Scherzo, bars 93–100

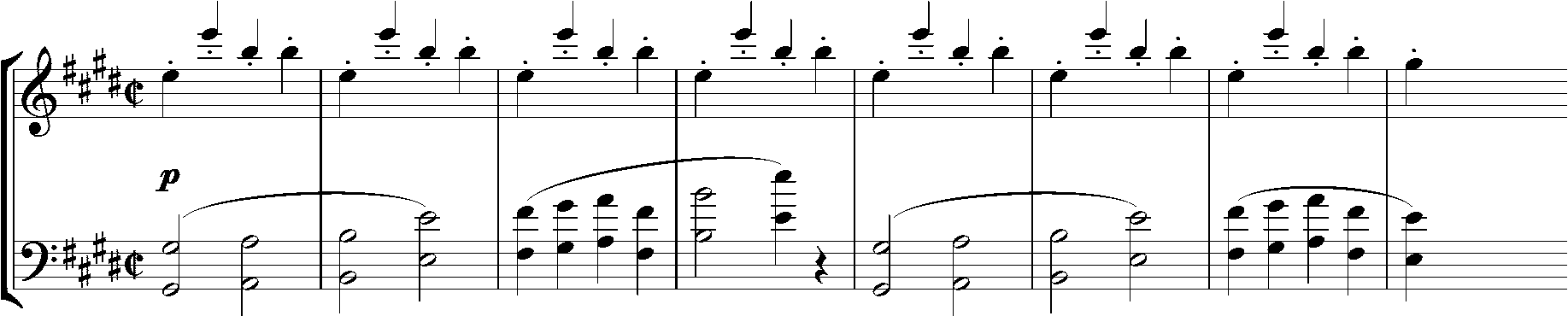
Beethoven Op 131 Trio from Scherzo, bars 93–100

Both the first and third acts of Wagner's final opera Parsifal feature a passage accompanying a scene where a band of Knights solemnly processes from the depths of forest to the hall of the Grail. The "Transformation music" that supports this change of scene is dominated by the iterated tolling of four bells:

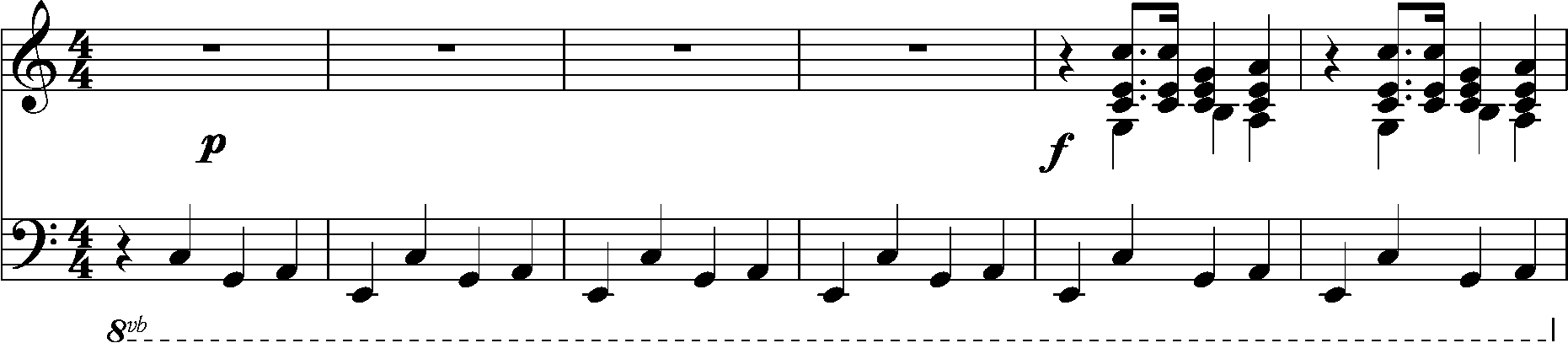
Wagner, Parsifal Act 1, transformation music

Brahms used ostinato patterns in both the finale of his Fourth Symphony and in the closing section of his Variations on a Theme by Haydn:

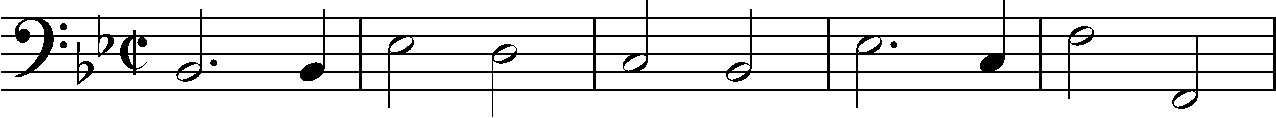
Brahms Variations on a Theme by Haydn, final section with ground bass

=== Twentieth century ===
Debussy featured an ostinato pattern throughout his Piano Prelude "Des pas sur la neige". Here, the ostinato pattern stays in the middle register of the piano – it is never used as a bass. "Remark that the footfall ostinato remains nearly throughout on the same notes, at the same pitch level... this piece is an appeal to the basic loneliness of all human beings, oft-forgotten perhaps, but, like the ostinato, forming a basic undercurrent of our history."

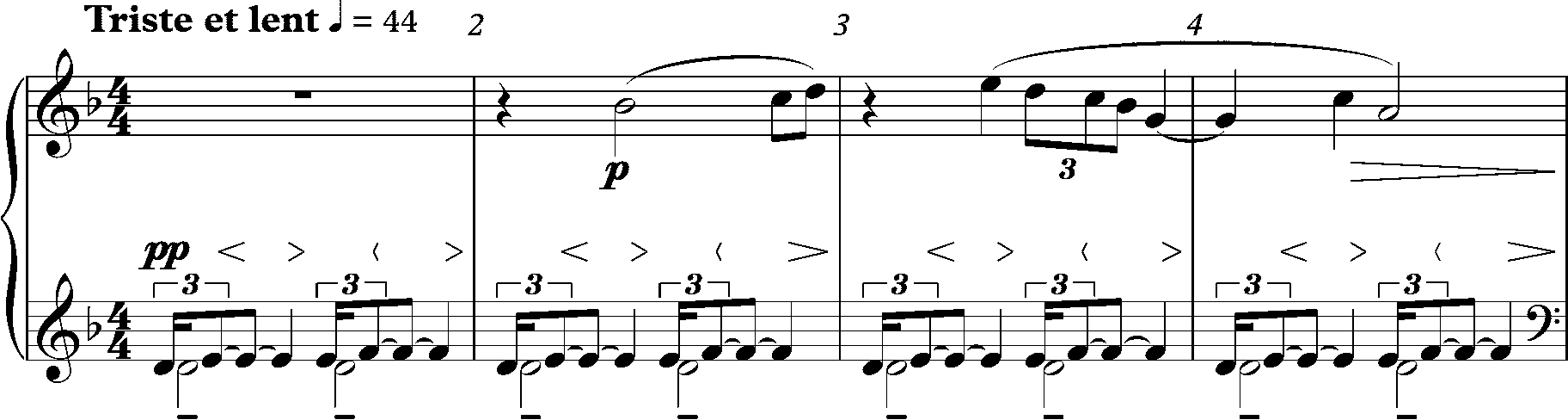
Debussy, Des pas sur la neige

Of all the major classical composers of the 20th century, Stravinsky is possibly the one most associated with the practice of ostinato. In conversation with the composer, his friend and colleague Robert Craft remarked "Your music always has an element of repetition, of ostinato. What is the function of ostinato?" Stravinsky replied; "It is static – that is, anti-development; and sometimes we need a contradiction to development." Stravinsky was particularly skilled at using ostinatos to confound rather than confirm rhythmic expectations. In the first of his Three Pieces for String Quartet, Stravinsky sets up three repeated patterns, which overlap one another and never coincide. "Here a rigid pattern of (3+2+2/4) bars is laid over a strictly recurring 23-beat tune (the bars being marked by a cello ostinato), so that their changing relationship is governed primarily by the pre-compositional scheme." "The rhythmical current running through the music is what binds together these curious mosaic-like pieces."

A subtler metrical conflict can be found in the final section of Stravinsky's Symphony of Psalms. The choir sing a melody in triple time, while the bass instruments in the orchestra play a 4-beat ostinato against this. "This is built up over an ostinato bass (harp, two pianos and timpani) moving in fourths like a pendulum."

== Sub-Saharan African music ==
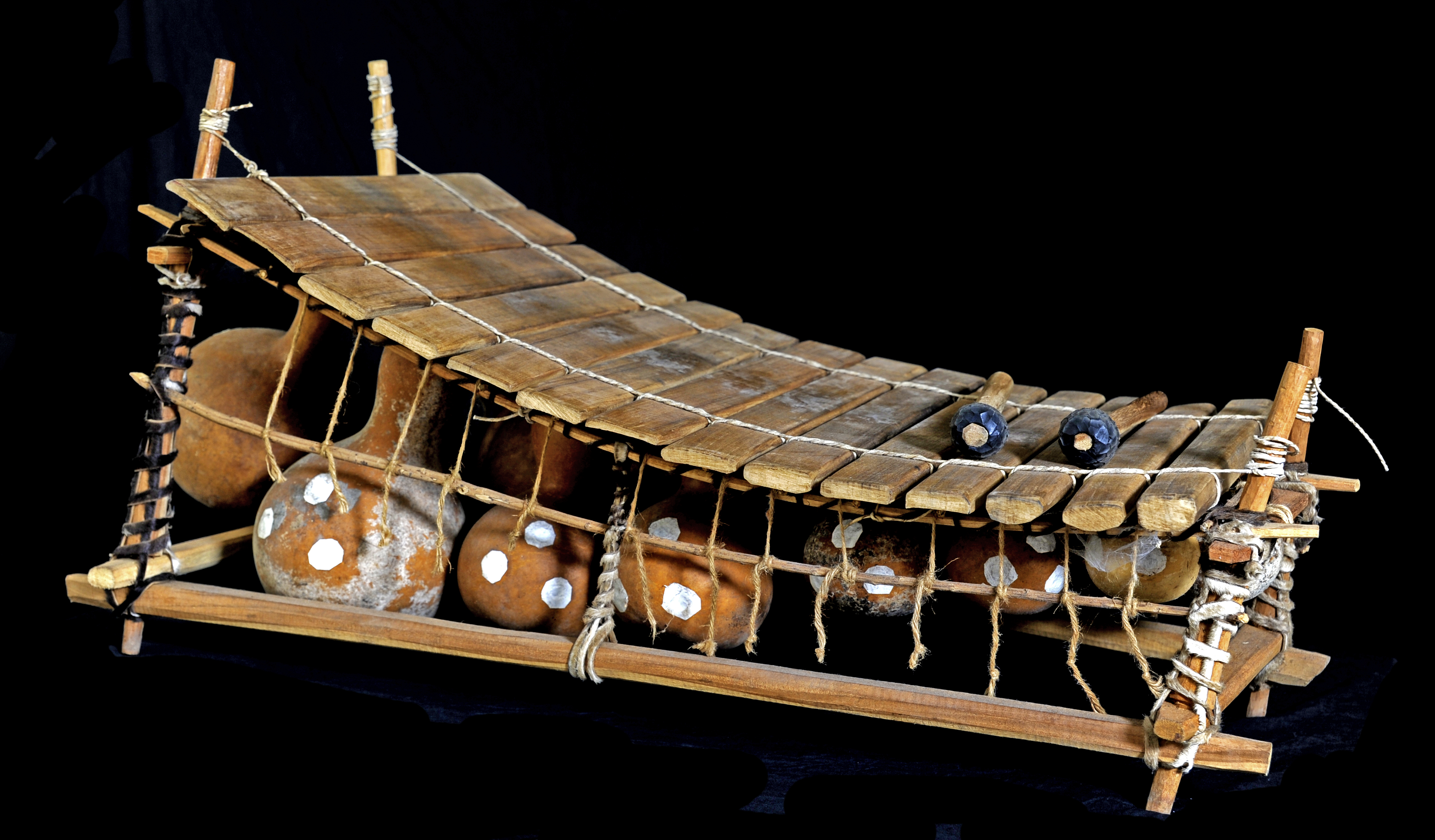
Ghanaian gyil

=== Counter-metric structure ===
Many instruments south of the Sahara Desert play ostinato melodies. These include lamellophones such as the mbira, as well as xylophones like the balafon, the bikutsi, and the gyil. Ostinato figures are also played on string instruments such as the kora, gankoqui bell ensembles, and pitched drums ensembles. Often, African ostinatos contain offbeats or cross-beats, that contradict the metric structure. Other African ostinatos generate complete cross-rhythms by sounding both the main beats and cross-beats. In the following example, a gyil sounds the three-against-two cross-rhythm (hemiola). The left hand (lower notes) sounds the two main beats, while the right hand (upper notes) sounds the three cross-beats.

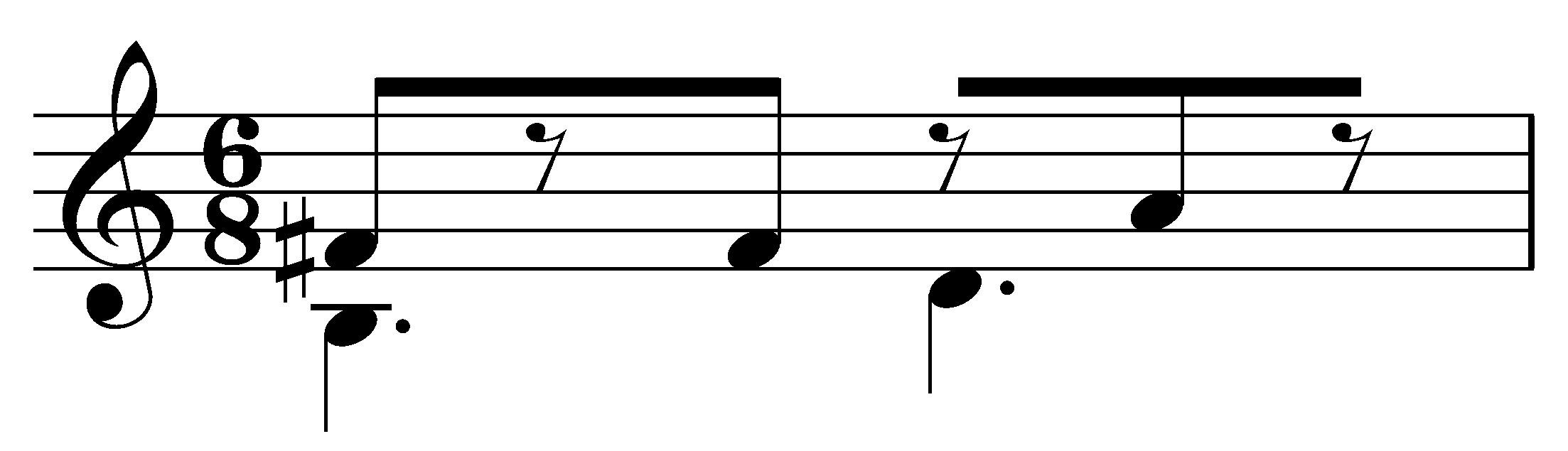
Ghanaian gyil cross-rhythmic ostinato

=== African harmonic progressions ===
Popular dance bands in West Africa and the Congo region feature ostinato-playing guitars. The African guitar parts are drawn from a variety of sources, including the indigenous mbira, as well as foreign influences such as James Brown-type funk riffs. However, the foreign influences are interpreted through a distinctly African ostinato sensibility. African guitar styles began with Congolese bands doing Cuban cover songs. The Cuban guajeo had a both familiar and exotic quality to the African musicians. Gradually, various regional guitar styles emerged, as indigenous influences became increasingly dominant within these Africanized guajeos.

As Moore states, "One could say that I – IV – V – IV [chord progressions] is to African music what the 12-bar blues is to North American music." Such progressions seem superficially to follow the conventions of Western music theory. However, performers of African popular music do not perceive these progressions in the same way. Harmonic progressions which move from the tonic to the subdominant (as they are known in European music) have been used in Traditional sub-Saharan African harmony for hundreds of years. Their elaborations follow all the conventions of traditional African harmonic principles. Gehard Kubik concludes:

The harmonic cycle of C–F–G–F [I–IV–V–IV] prominent in Congo/Zaire popular music simply cannot be defined as a progression from tonic to subdominant to dominant and back to subdominant (on which it ends) because in the performer's appreciation they are of equal status, and not in any hierarchical order as in Western music—(Kubik 1999).

== Afro-Cuban guajeo ==
A guajeo is a typical Cuban ostinato melody, most often consisting of arpeggiated chords in syncopated patterns. The guajeo is a hybrid of the African and European ostinato. The guajeo was first played as accompaniment on the tres in the folkloric changüí and son. The term guajeo is often used to mean specific ostinato patterns played by a tres, piano, an instrument of the violin family, or saxophones. The guajeo is a fundamental component of modern-day salsa, and Latin jazz. The following example shows a basic guajeo pattern.

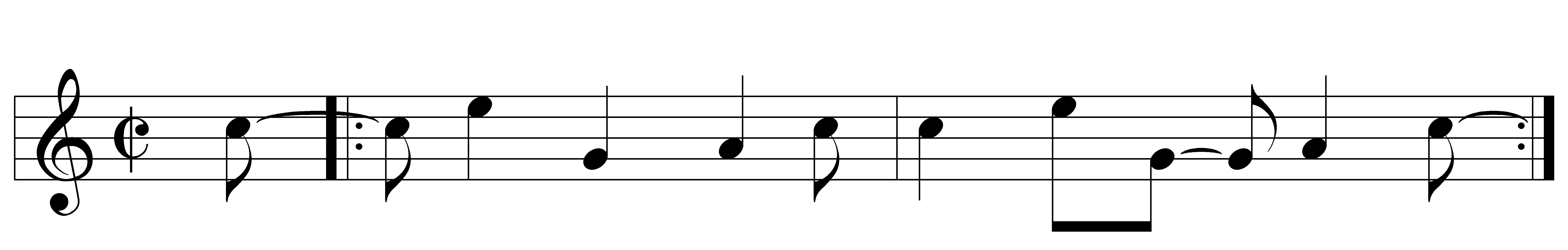
Cuban guajeo written in cut-time

The guajeo is a seamless Afro-Euro ostinato hybrid, which has had a major influence upon jazz, R&B, rock 'n' roll and popular music in general. The Beatles' "I Feel Fine" guitar riff is guajeo-like.

== Riff ==
In various popular music styles, riff refers to a brief, relaxed phrase repeated over changing melodies. It may serve as a refrain or melodic figure, often played by the rhythm section instruments or solo instruments that form the basis or accompaniment of a musical composition. Though they are most often found in rock music, heavy metal music, Latin, funk and jazz, classical music is also sometimes based on a simple riff, such as Ravel's Boléro. Riffs can be as simple as a tenor saxophone honking a simple, catchy rhythmic figure, or as complex as the riff-based variations in the head arrangements played by the Count Basie Orchestra.

David Brackett (1999) defines riffs as "short melodic phrases", while Richard Middleton (1999) defines them as "short rhythmic, melodic, or harmonic figures repeated to form a structural framework". Rikky Rooksby states: "A riff is a short, repeated, memorable musical phrase, often pitched low on the guitar, which focuses much of the energy and excitement of a rock song."

In jazz and R&B, riffs are often used as the starting point for longer compositions. The riff from Charlie Parker's bebop number "Now's the Time" (1945) re-emerged four years later as the R&B dance hit "The Hucklebuck". The verse of "The Hucklebuck"—another riff—was "borrowed" from the Artie Matthews composition "Weary Blues". Glenn Miller's "In the Mood" had an earlier life as Wingy Manone's "Tar Paper Stomp". All these songs use twelve bar blues riffs, and most of these riffs probably precede the examples given.

Neither of the terms 'riff' or 'lick' are used in classical music. Instead, individual musical phrases used as the basis of classical music pieces are called ostinatos or simply phrases. Contemporary jazz writers also use riff- or lick-like ostinatos in modal music. Latin jazz often uses guajeo-based riffs.

== Vamp ==
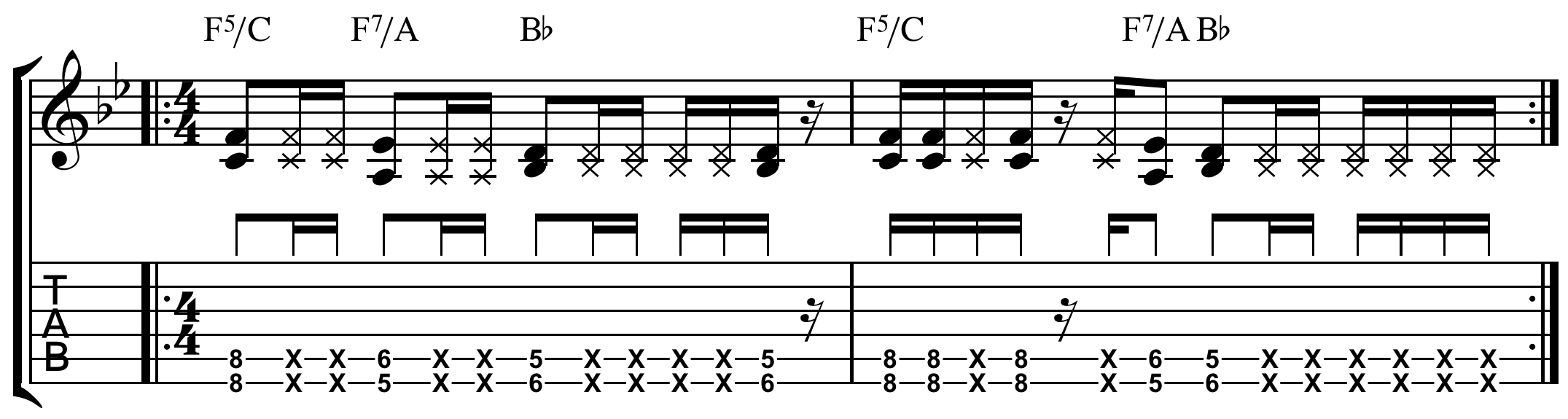
Vamp riff typical of funk and R&B

In music, a vamp is a repeating musical figure, section, or accompaniment. Vamps are usually harmonically sparse: A vamp may consist of a single chord or a sequence of chords played in a repeated rhythm. The term frequently appeared in the instruction "vamp till ready" on sheet music for popular songs in the 1930s and 1940s, indicating the accompanist should repeat the musical phrase until the vocalist was ready. Vamps are generally symmetrical, self-contained, and open to variation. They are used in blues, jazz, gospel, soul, and musical theater. Vamps are also found in rock, funk, reggae, R&B, pop, and country. The equivalent in classical music is an ostinato, in hip hop and electronic music the loop, and in rock music the riff.

The slang term vamp comes from the Middle English word vampe (sock), from Old French avanpie, equivalent to Modern French avant-pied, literally before-foot.

Many vamp-oriented songwriters begin the creative process by attempting to evoke a mood or feeling while riffing freely on an instrument or scat singing. Many well known artists primarily build songs with a vamp/riff/ostinato based approach—including John Lee Hooker ("Boogie Chillen", "House Rent Boogie"), Bo Diddley ("Hey Bo Diddley", "Who Do You Love?"), Jimmy Page ("Ramble On", "Bron Yr Aur"), Nine Inch Nails ("Closer") and Beck ("Loser").

Classic examples of vamps in jazz include "A Night in Tunisia", "Take Five", "A Love Supreme", "Maiden Voyage" and "Cantaloupe Island". Rock examples include the long jam at the ends of "Loose Change" by Neil Young and Crazy Horse and "Sooner or Later" by King's X.

=== Jazz, fusion, and Latin jazz ===
In jazz, fusion, and related genres, a background vamp provides a performer with a harmonic framework supporting improvisation. In Latin jazz guajeos fulfill the role of piano vamp. A vamp at the beginning of a jazz tune may act as a springboard to the main tune; a vamp at the end of a song is often called a tag.

==== Examples ====
"Take Five" begins with a repeated, syncopated figure in 5/4 time, which pianist Dave Brubeck plays throughout the song (except for Joe Morello's drum solo and a variation on the chords in the middle section).

The music from Miles Davis's modal period (c.1958–1963) was based on improvising songs with a small number of chords. The jazz standard "So What" uses a vamp in the two-note "Sooooo what?" figure, regularly played by the piano and the trumpet throughout. Jazz scholar Barry Kernfeld calls this music vamp music.

Examples include the outros to George Benson's "Body Talk" and "Plum", and the solo changes to "Breezin'". The following songs are dominated by vamps: John Coltrane, Kenny Burrell, and Grant Green's versions of "My Favorite Things", Herbie Hancock's "Watermelon Man," "Ostinato (Suite for Angela)," and "Chameleon", Wes Montgomery's "Bumpin' on Sunset" and Larry Carlton's "Room 335".

The Afro-Cuban vamp style known as guajeo is used in the bebop/Latin jazz standard "A Night in Tunisia". Depending upon the musician, a repeating figure in "A Night in Tunisia" could be called an ostinato, guajeo, riff, or vamp. The Cuban-jazz hybrid spans the disciplines that encompass all these terms.

=== Gospel, soul, and funk ===
In gospel and soul music, the band often vamps on a simple ostinato groove at the end of a song, usually over a single chord. In soul music, the end of recorded songs often contains a display of vocal effects—such as rapid scales, arpeggios, and improvised passages. For recordings, sound engineers gradually fade out the vamp section at the end of a song, to transition to the next track on the album. Salsoul singers such as Loleatta Holloway have become notable for their vocal improvisations at the end of songs, and they are sampled and used in other songs. Andrae Crouch extended the use of vamps in gospel, introducing chain vamps (one vamp after the other, each successive vamp drawn from the first).

1970s-era funk music often takes a short one or two bar musical figure based on a single chord one would consider an introduction vamp in jazz or soul music, and then uses this vamp as the basis of the entire song ("Funky Drummer" by James Brown, for example). Jazz, blues, and rock are almost always based on chord progressions (a sequence of changing chords), and they use the changing harmony to build tension and sustain listener interest. Unlike these music genres, funk is based on the rhythmic groove of the percussion, rhythm section instruments, usually all over a single chord. "In funk, harmony is often second to the 'lock,' the linking of contrapuntal parts that are played on guitar, bass, and drums in the repeating vamp."

Examples include Stevie Wonder's vamp-based "Superstition" and Little Johnny Taylor's "Part Time Love", which features an extended improvisation over a two-chord vamp.

=== Musical theater ===
In musical theater, a vamp, or intro, is the few bars, one to eight, of music without lyrics that begin a printed copy of a song. The orchestra may repeat the vamp or other accompaniment during dialogue or stage business, as accompaniment for onstage transitions of indeterminate length. The score provides a one or two bar vamp figure, and indicates, "Vamp till cue", by the conductor. The vamp gives the onstage singers time to prepare for the song or the next verse, without requiring the music to pause. Once the vamp section is over, the music continues to the next section.

The vamp may be written by the composer of the song, a copyist employed by the publisher, or the arranger for the vocalist. The vamp serves three main purposes: it provides the key, establishes the tempo, and provides emotional context. The vamp may be as short as a bell tone, sting (a harmonized bell tone with stress on the starting note), or measures long. The rideout is the transitional music that begins on the downbeat of the last word of the song and is usually two to four bars long, though it may be as short as a sting or as long as a Roxy Rideout.

== Indian classical music ==
In Indian classical music, during Tabla or Pakhawaj solo performances and Kathak dance accompaniments, a conceptually similar melodic pattern known as the Lehara (sometimes spelled Lehra) or Nagma is played repeatedly throughout the performance. This melodic pattern is set to the number of beats in a rhythmic cycle (Tala or Taal) being performed and may be based on one or a blend of multiple Ragas.

The basic idea of the lehara is to provide a steady melodious framework and keep the time-cycle for rhythmic improvisations. It serves as an auditory workbench not only for the soloist but also for the audience to appreciate the ingenuity of the improvisations and thus the merits of the overall performance. In Indian Classical Music, the concept of 'sam' (pronounced as 'sum') carries paramount importance. The sam is the target unison beat (and almost always the first beat) of any rhythmic cycle. The second most important beat is the Khali, which is a complement of the sam. Besides these two prominent beats, there are other beats of emphasis in any given taal, which signify 'khand's (divisions) of the taal. E.g. 'Roopak' or 'Rupak' taal, a 7-beat rhythmic cycle, is divided 3–2–2, further implying that the 1st, 4th, and 6th beats are the prominent beats in that taal. Therefore, it is customary, but not essential, to align the lehara according to the divisions of the Taal. It is done with a view to emphasize those beats that mark the divisions of the Taal.

The lehara can be played on a variety of instruments, including the sarangi, harmonium, sitar, sarod, flute and others. The playing of the lehara is relatively free from the numerous rules and constraints of Raga Sangeet, which are upheld and honoured in the tradition of Indian Classical Music. The lehara may be interspersed with short and occasional improvisations built around the basic melody. It is also permissible to switch between two or more disparate melodies during the course of the performance. It is essential that the lehara be played with the highest precision in Laya (Tempo) and Swara control, which requires years of specialist training (Taalim) and practice (Riyaaz). It is considered a hallmark of excellence to play lehara alongside a recognised Tabla or Pakhawaj virtuoso as it is a difficult task to keep a steady pulse while the percussionist is improvising or playing difficult compositions in counterpoint. While there may be scores of individually talented instrumentalists, there are very few who are capable of playing the lehra for a Tabla / Pakhawaj solo performance.

== See also ==
- Canto Ostinato
- Chaconne
- Chanking
- Fill (music)
- Folia
- Glossary of musical terminology
- Hook (music)
- Imitation (music)
- Leitmotif
- Music sequencer
- O Fortuna
- Passacaglia
- Pedal point
- Sequence (music)
- Traditional sub-Saharan African harmony
- Minimal music
