= Ear Candy (King's X album) =

Studio album by King's X
- Released: May 20, 1996
- Recorded: 1995
- Genre: Hard rock
- Length: 49:18
- Label: Atlantic
- Producers: Arnold Lanni, King's X

King's X chronology
Dogman (1994)	Ear Candy (1996)	Best of King's X (1997)

Professional ratings
Review scores
Source	Rating
AllMusic	2.5/5 stars
CCM Magazine	(not rated)
Collector's Guide to Heavy Metal	10/10
Entertainment Weekly	A-
Q	3/5 stars

Ear Candy is the sixth studio album by American rock band King's X, released in 1996. It was produced by Arnold Lanni and King's X.

The album has two songs which are rewritten versions of earlier songs: "Picture" is also known as "The Door", a song with different lyrics, released on their pre-King's X release Sneak Preview. The song "Mississippi Moon" is mainly inspired on the song "If I Could Fly", which King's X played in shows after they had changed their name to its definite version, King's X.

The bonus track "Freedom" can also be found as a b-side of the single "A Box". It was later given a proper release on the album Ogre Tones.

== Track listing ==
All tracks are written by Doug Pinnick, Ty Tabor and Jerry Gaskill.

No.	Title	Lead vocals	Length
1.	"The Train"	Ty Tabor/Doug Pinnick	3:06
2.	"(Thinking and Wondering) What I'm Gonna Do"	Pinnick	3:43
3.	"Sometime"	Pinnick	3:48
4.	"A Box"	Pinnick	4:40
5.	"Looking for Love"	Pinnick	2:59
6.	"Mississippi Moon"	Tabor	3:11
7.	"67"	Pinnick	4:42
8.	"Lies in the Sand (The Ballad of...)"	Tabor	3:53
9.	"Run"	Pinnick	3:28
10.	"Fathers"	Pinnick	3:21
11.	"American Cheese (Jerry's Pianto)"	Jerry Gaskill	2:54
12.	"Picture"	Pinnick	5:35
13.	"Life Going By"	Tabor	4:04
Total length:			49:18

Japanese edition bonus track
No.	Title	Lead vocals	Length
14.	"Freedom"	Tabor	3:33

== Personnel ==
- Doug Pinnick – bass, lead vocals
- Ty Tabor – guitars, backing vocals
- Jerry Gaskill – drums, backing vocals

== Album notes ==
- This would be the last studio album King's X would release on Atlantic Records.
- "American Cheese (Jerry's Pianto)" is the second released song to feature Jerry Gaskill on lead vocals. The term pianto is an Italian word, meaning "cry" or "lament". It is also a musical term referring to the motif of descending minor seconds (half-steps) to evoke crying or weeping.
- "American Cheese (Jerry's Pianto)" and "Lies in the Sand (The Ballad of...)" produced by Ty Tabor and King's X.
- "A Box" features additional vocals by Glen Phillips of Toad The Wet Sprocket.
- "Sometime" is not to be confused with "Sometimes", which is taken from King's X's first album Out of the Silent Planet.

== Chart performance ==
Chart	Peak
U.S. Billboard Christian Albums	4
Swedish Album Chart	52
U.S. Billboard 200	105
