= XV (King's X album) =

Studio album by King's X
- Released: May 20, 2008
- Recorded: 2008
- Studio: WireWorld (Nashville, Tennessee)
- Genre: Hard rock, progressive metal
- Length: 53:54
- Label: InsideOut
- Producer: Michael Wagener

King's X chronology
| Live & Live Some More (2007) | XV (2008) | Three Sides of One (2022) |

Professional ratings
Review scores
| Source | Rating |
|---|---|
| AllMusic | 4/5 stars |

XV is the twelfth studio album by American rock band King's X, released in May 2008. It is the band's second album after 2005's Ogre Tones to chart on the Billboard 200, peaking at No. 145. The album also charted on the Independent Albums chart (peaking at No. 12) and Billboard Comprehensive Albums (peaking at No. 167). The Roman numeral XV means 15, as this is their 15th album, counting live albums and compilations. Although King's X had continued to be active in the years after its release, XV was the band's last studio album until the 2022 release of their follow-up record Three Sides of One.

== Track listing ==
All tracks written by Jerry Gaskill, Doug Pinnick and Ty Tabor.

| No. | Title | Length |
|---|---|---|
| 1. | "Pray" | 4:15 |
| 2. | "Blue" | 4:25 |
| 3. | "Repeating Myself" | 4:09 |
| 4. | "Rocket Ship" | 2:44 |
| 5. | "Julie" | 2:41 |
| 6. | "Alright" | 2:59 |
| 7. | "Broke" | 3:56 |
| 8. | "I Just Want to Live" | 4:21 |
| 9. | "Move" | 4:02 |
| 10. | "I Don't Know" | 3:32 |
| 11. | "Stuck" | 3:56 |
| 12. | "Go Tell Somebody" | 3:17 |
| 13. | "Love and Rockets (Hell's Screaming)" | 4:22 |
| 14. | "No Lie" | 5:20 |

== Personnel ==
- Doug Pinnick – bass, lead vocals
- Ty Tabor – guitars, backing vocals
- Jerry Gaskill – drums, backing vocals
- Recorded, produced and mixed by Michael Wagener for WireWorld Studio
- Mastered at Alien Beans Studios by Ty Tabor
- Additional background vocals – Wally Farkas, Tim Heap, Dave Williams, Bro. Jeremiah Loudenphat, Allen Thomason, and Michael Wagener

Art direction

- Graphic design and layout: Patrick Zahorodnuik
- Illustrations: Warren Flanagan Warren Flanagan designs
- Photography: Mark Weiss
