= Black Like Sunday =

Studio album by King's X
- Released: May 20, 2003
- Recorded: November 2002 – March 2003
- Genre: Hard rock
- Length: 56:17
- Label: Brop!/Metal Blade
- Producer: King's X

King's X chronology
Manic Moonlight (2001)	Black Like Sunday (2003)	Live All Over the Place (2004)

Professional ratings
Review scores
Source	Rating
AllMusic	3/5 stars
The Phantom Tollbooth (Boughen)	2.5/5 stars
The Phantom Tollbooth (Smith)	4/5 stars

Black Like Sunday is the tenth studio album by American rock band King's X. The songs on this album are rare and originally unreleased recordings that were re-recorded by fan demand. The cover was painted by a fan that won a contest.

== Track listing ==
No.	Title	Length
1.	"Black Like Sunday"	3:31
2.	"Rock Pile"	3:31
3.	"Danger Zone"	3:23
4.	"Working Man"	3:49
5.	"Dreams"	2:53
6.	"Finished"	4:08
7.	"Screamer"	4:21
8.	"Bad Luck"	3:26
9.	"Down"	4:26
10.	"Won't Turn Back"	2:36
11.	"Two"	2:48
12.	"You're the Only One"	3:42
13.	"Johnny"	11:36
14.	"Save Us"	2:00

== Personnel ==
- Doug Pinnick – bass, lead vocals
- Ty Tabor – guitars, backing vocals
- Jerry Gaskill – drums, backing vocals

=== Liner notes ===
- Produced by King's X
- Mixed and Mastered at Alien Beans Studios by Ty Tabor
- All songs by King's X except "Working Man" by Dan McCollam and Doug Pinnick
- Recorded between November 2002 and March 2003 at Alien Beans Studios, Katy, Texas
- Cover painting by Danny Wilson - Satellite Studio

== Charts ==
Year	Chart	Position
2003	Top Independent Albums	13
