= Please Come Home... Mr. Bulbous =

Studio album by King's X
- Released: May 23, 2000
- Recorded: December 1999 – January 2000
- Studios: Hound Pound Recording Studio and Alien Beans Studios
- Genre: Hard rock
- Length: 44:54
- Label: Metal Blade
- Producers: King's X and Ty Tabor

King's X chronology
Tape Head (1998)	Please Come Home... Mr. Bulbous (2000)	Manic Moonlight (2001)

Professional ratings
Review scores
Source	Rating
AllMusic	3/5 stars
The Phantom Tollbooth	4.5/5 stars

Please Come Home... Mr. Bulbous is the eighth studio album by American rock band King's X. It was released in 2000 via Metal Blade Records.

== Track listing ==
All songs written by King's X.

No.	Title	Length
1.	"Fish Bowl Man"	4:28
2.	"Julia"	3:39
3.	"She's Gone Away"	4:37
4.	"Marsh Mellow Field"	5:30
5.	"When You're Scared"	4:26
6.	"Charlie Sheen"	3:51
7.	"Smudge"	3:52
8.	"Bitter Sweet"	2:13
9.	"Move Me"	4:58
10.	"Move Me, Pt. 2"	7:20

== Personnel ==
- Doug Pinnick – bass, lead vocals
- Ty Tabor – guitars, backing vocals
- Jerry Gaskill – drums, backing vocals

== Album notes ==
- Recorded and mixed by Ty Tabor
- Doug uses Yamaha Basses, DR Strings, Ampeg Amps and Seymour Duncan Pickups
- Jerry uses Yamaha Drums, Vater Sticks and Paiste Cymbals
- Ty uses Yamaha Guitars and DR Strings
- Misc. ramblings by Esther, Yuko, Joe and Dirk – between some tracks on the CD there are tongue twisters in Dutch and Japanese. These were collected by the band on a European tour:
  - at the end of track 1: Acht-en-Tachtig-Prachtige-Grachten
    This is Dutch for "88 (achtentachtig) beautiful (prachtige) canals (grachten)."
  - at the end of track 3: Tonari no kyaku wa yoku kaki kuu kyaku da
    This is a Japanese tongue twister (hayakuchi kotoba) meaning "The adjacent (tonari) customer (kyaku) eats (kuu) persimmons (kaki) often (yoku)."
  - at the end of track 4: Zes-en-Zestig-Sinaas-Appel-Schillen
    This is again Dutch and means "66 (zesenzestig) orange (sinaasappel) peels (schillen)."
  - at the end of track 5: Hottentotten-Tenten-Tentoonstellingen
    Dutch tongue twister meaning "(an) exhibition of tents made by the Hottentots."
  - at the end of track 6: Chikushō, nante hidee sandoicchi da
    Japanese meaning "Damn (chikushō)! How awful (hidee) this sandwich (sandoicchi) is!"
  - at the end of track 10: Acht-en-Tachtig-Prachtige-Grachten
    See first tongue twister.
