= All Over the Place =

All Over the Place may refer to:

- All Over the Place (The Bangles album), 1984
- All Over the Place (Mike Stern album), 2012
- All Over the Place (KSI album), 2021
- All Over the Place (TV series), a British children's programme

== See also ==
- Frank Caliendo: All Over the Place, a 2007 television special
- Live All Over the Place, a 2004 album by King's X
