= Manic Moonlight =

Studio album by King's X
- Released: September 25, 2001
- Recorded: February – May 2001
- Genre: Hard rock, experimental rock
- Length: 45:57
- Label: Metal Blade
- Producer: King's X

King's X chronology
Please Come Home... Mr. Bulbous (2000)	Manic Moonlight (2001)	Black Like Sunday (2003)

Professional ratings
Review scores
Source	Rating
AllMusic	3/5 stars
Chronicles of Chaos	2/10
The Encyclopedia of Popular Music	3/5 stars
Rock Sound	4/5 stars

Manic Moonlight is the ninth studio album by American rock band King's X, released in 2001 via Metal Blade Records. The album was notable for its inclusion of electronic loops.

== Critical reception ==
AllMusic called the album "the most confidently organic and groove-based record of [the band's] career." Exclaim! wrote that "all the requisite solid performances, chunky grooves, flashy guitar work and beautifully realised vocal harmonies are here, but they're too often obscured by muddy compositions and an apparent desire to get modern with the use of samples, record scratching and loop beats." In an article about Greg Prato's oral history of the band, Rolling Stone called the album "underrated."

== Track listing ==
No.	Title	Length
1.	"Believe"	4:46
2.	"Manic Moonlight"	4:32
3.	"Yeah"	3:40
4.	"False Alarm"	4:36
5.	"Static"	4:29
6.	"Skeptical Winds"	6:51
7.	"The Other Side"	4:49
8.	"Vegetable"	6:27
9.	"Jenna"	5:06
10.	"Water Ceremony"	0:18

The Japanese release has two bonus tracks:

11. "Vegetable" (long version) - 7:36
12. "Believe" (long version) - 6:26

== Personnel ==
- Doug Pinnick – bass, lead vocals
- Ty Tabor – guitars, backing vocals
- Jerry Gaskill – drums, backing vocals

=== Liner notes ===
- Produced and mixed by Ty Tabor
- All songs written by King's X
- Recorded between February and May 2001 at Alien Beans Studios
- Engineered and mastered by Ty Tabor at Alien Beans Studios
- Graphics by Brian J Ames
- Cover art by Ty Tabor

== Charts ==
Year	Chart	Position
2001	Top Independent Albums	19
