= Dogman (song) =

Single by King's X

from the album Dogman
- Released: 1994
- Recorded: Southern Tracks, Atlanta
- Length: 4:01
- Label: Atlantic
- Songwriters: Jerry Gaskill, Doug Pinnick, Ty Tabor
- Producer: Brendan O'Brien

King's X singles chronology
"Black Flag" (1992)	"Dogman" (1994)

"Dogman" is a song by the American rock band King's X. It was released as a single in support of their 1994 album Dogman.

== Track listing ==
US CD promo single (PRCD 5396–2)

1. "Dogman" (Jerry Gaskill, Doug Pinnick, Ty Tabor) – 4:01

== Charts ==
Chart (1994)	Peak position
US Mainstream Rock (Billboard)	20

== Personnel ==
Adapted from the Dogman liner notes.

King's X

- Doug Pinnick – bass, vocals
- Ty Tabor – guitar
- Jerry Gaskill – drums

Production and additional personnel

- Nick DiDia – recording
- Bob Ludwig – mastering
- Brendan O'Brien – production, mixing

== Release history ==
Region	Date	Label	Format	Catalog
United States	1994	Atlantic	CD	PRCD 5396
