= Tape Head =

Studio album by King's X
- Released: October 20, 1998
- Recorded: May–July 1998
- Studios: Hound Pound and Alien Beans
- Genre: Hard rock
- Length: 47:41
- Label: Metal Blade
- Producer: King's X

King's X chronology
Best of King's X (1997)	Tape Head (1998)	Please Come Home... Mr. Bulbous (2000)

Professional ratings
Review scores
Source	Rating
AllMusic	4/5 stars
Collector's Guide to Heavy Metal	10/10
The Phantom Tollbooth	{2 reviews}
HM Magazine	HM Magazine review

Tape Head is the seventh studio album by American rock band King's X, released in 1998 via Metal Blade Records.

A music video was made for the song "Fade". "World" is a reworked song from the band's Sneak Preview demos. The controversial unreleased track "Quality Control" is included on the album, but has been re-titled to "Happy". The majority of the lyrics are now different, including the lack of profanity.

The album cover picture is that of Doug Pinnick wrapped in recording tape.

According to Pinnick, he brought the songs "Happy", "Cupid" and "Hate You", and Ty Tabor brought "Ocean" to the Tape Head recording sessions. All other songs were band created during the recording session.

The song "Walter Bela Farkas" was recorded live August 8, 1996, at the Tramps nightclub in New York City.

== Track listing ==
All songs written by King's X.

No.	Title	Length
1.	"Groove Machine"	3:42
2.	"Fade"	3:24
3.	"Over and Over"	3:23
4.	"Ono"	3:55
5.	"Cupid"	4:14
6.	"Ocean"	3:08
7.	"Little Bit of Soul"	4:13
8.	"Hate You"	3:01
9.	"Higher Than God"	3:00
10.	"Happy"	5:38
11.	"Mr. Evil"	3:45
12.	"World"	3:36
13.	"Walter Bela Farkas (Live Peace in New York)"	2:32

Japanese edition bonus track
No.	Title	Length
14.	"Two"	3:14

== Personnel ==
- Doug Pinnick – bass, lead vocals
- Ty Tabor – guitars, backing vocals
- Jerry Gaskill – drums, backing vocals

Additional musicians

- Wally Farkas – vocals on "Walter Bela Farkas"

Production and design

- Mixed and mastered at Alien Beans by Ty Tabor
- Photography by Wanda Tabor
- Cover by Ty Tabor
- Design by Brian J Ames
