= Faith Hope Love =

Studio album by King's X
- Released: October 23, 1990
- Studio: Rampart, Houston, Texas
- Genre: Hard rock, progressive metal
- Length: 61:52
- Label: Megaforce
- Producer: Sam Taylor, King's X

King's X chronology
Gretchen Goes to Nebraska (1989)	Faith Hope Love (1990)	King's X (1992)

Faith Hope Love is the third studio album by the American rock band King's X. "Six Broken Soldiers" is the first King's X song to feature drummer Jerry Gaskill on lead vocals.

== Reception ==
Professional ratings
Review scores
Source	Rating
AllMusic	4/5 stars
Collector's Guide to Heavy Metal	10/10
Entertainment Weekly	B
Rolling Stone	4/5 stars

Faith, Hope, Love proved to be King's X's most commercially successful album, nearly reaching gold status.

The album was listed at No. 52 in the 2001 book CCM Presents: The 100 Greatest Albums in Christian Music.

== Track listing ==
All tracks are written by Doug Pinnick, Ty Tabor and Jerry Gaskill.

No.	Title	Lead vocals	Length
1.	"We Are Finding Who We Are"	Dug Pinnick	4:40
2.	"It's Love"	Ty Tabor	4:37
3.	"I'll Never Get Tired of You"	Pinnick	3:47
4.	"Fine Art of Friendship"	Pinnick	4:21
5.	"Mr. Wilson"	Tabor	3:39
6.	"Moanjam"	Pinnick	6:05
7.	"Six Broken Soldiers"	Jerry Gaskill	3:33
8.	"I Can't Help It"	Tabor	3:53
9.	"Talk to You"	Pinnick	4:36
10.	"Everywhere I Go"	Pinnick	3:54
11.	"We Were Born to Be Loved"	Pinnick	4:52
12.	"Faith Hope Love"	Pinnick	9:22
13.	"Legal Kill"	Tabor	4:43
Total length:			61:52

== Personnel ==
- Dug* Pinnick – bass, lead vocals
- Ty Tabor – guitars, backing vocals, acoustic guitar, sitar
- Jerry Gaskill – drums, percussion, backing vocals

Additional personnel

- Galactic Cowboys (Monty Colvin, Alan Doss, Ben Huggins, Dane Sonnier) – backing vocals on "Mr. Wilson" & "Faith Hope Love"
- Max Dyer – cello on "Six Broken Soldiers", "Faith Hope Love" & "Legal Kill"
- Erik Ralske – French horn on "Six Broken Soldiers"
- Little Willie Sammy Taylor – pipe organ on "Six Broken Soldiers"
- Kemper Crabb – soprano recorder on "Legal Kill"

== Chart performance ==
Chart	Peak
US Billboard Top Contemporary Christian	31
UK Albums Chart	70
US Billboard 200	85

Singles – Billboard (United States)

Year	Single	Chart	Position
1990	"It's Love"	Mainstream Rock Tracks	6
