= Ear Candy =

Ear Candy may refer to:

- Ear Candy (King's X album), 1996
- Ear Candy (Helen Reddy album), 1977
