= Bill & Ted's Bogus Journey (soundtrack) =

Bill & Ted's Bogus Journey: Music from the Motion Picture

Soundtrack album by Various Artists
- Released: July 9, 1991
- Genres: Rock; glam metal; alternative metal
- Length: 52:04
- Labels: Interscope, East West
- Producer: Tom Whalley

Singles from Bill & Ted's Bogus Journey: Music from the Motion Picture
- 1. "God Gave Rock 'N' Roll to You II" Released: 1991

Professional ratings
Review scores
Source	Rating
Allmusic	3/5 stars

Bill & Ted's Bogus Journey: Music from the Motion Picture is the licensed soundtrack to the 1991 Orion Pictures film Bill & Ted's Bogus Journey. It was released by Interscope Records on July 9, 1991, on CD and cassette formats. In Japan it was released on August 25.

== Soundtrack information ==
Unlike the soundtrack to the film's predecessor, Bill & Ted's Excellent Adventure, this soundtrack features music from artists well-known at the time of the film's release. Many of these songs, such as Faith No More's "The Perfect Crime" and Megadeth's "Go to Hell", help paint the darker tone of the film. Many of the contributing artists have a cameo of some form in the film. "Shout it Out" was recorded while Slaughter was on the road during their Stick It Live tour. The Winger track "Battle Stations" was written by front man Kip Winger after reading the script for the film and recorded shortly after the band returned from their first European tour. Neverland's song "Drinking Again" was not used in the film, but was a substitute for another Neverland song "For the Love (of Music)". However the intro from "Drinking Again" was used for a television promo for the film. Both songs were released one month prior on Neverland's self-titled debut album. The version of "God Gave Rock 'n Roll to You II" is not that which plays at the film's end as it lacks the intro by Steve Vai and the sound of girls chanting the chorus as the song fades to end. The intro solo was released by Steve Vai in his compilation album The Elusive Light and Sound, Vol. 1, along with all of the other small pieces performed by him during the movie. Pieced together versions featuring Steve Vai's intro have been made by fans. "Dream of a New Day" was previously released on Richie Kotzen's 1990 album Fever Dream. "Tommy the Cat" was previously released on Primus' album Sailing the Seas of Cheese. In this version, the title character Tommy was voiced by singer songwriter Tom Waits. Notably, the track "The Reaper Rap", a reprise of Steve Vai's "The Reaper", features not only sound bytes of dialog heard in the film, but also dialog from the film's deleted scenes now believed to be lost. Portions of "The Reaper Rap" are absent in the film during its play and feature sounds that not included in the version that appear with this release.

King's X's contribution to the soundtrack, "Junior's Gone Wild", was also included as a bonus track on the European release of their 1992 self-titled album, from whose sessions the recording is taken.

== Track listing ==
#	Title	Performer(s)	Notes
1	"Shout it Out"	Slaughter	Plays while the Evil Bill and Ted continue to wreck their human counterparts' apartment, right before getting another message from DeNomolos.
2	"Battle Stations"	Winger	Plays as Bill and Ted head for the Battle of the Bands competition, and Station constructs the good robot version of Bill and Ted. Also in the extended version seen exclusively on TBS where Bill gives Death a pep talk. (The latter scene is unreleased on DVD.)
3	"God Gave Rock 'N' Roll to You II"	Kiss	First closing theme.
4	"Drinking Again"	Neverland	Not used in the film. Was instead used in a few trailers for the film.
5	"Dream of a New Day"	Richie Kotzen	Plays as Bill and Ted pull into the "Builders Emporium" parking lot.
6	"The Reaper"	Steve Vai	Plays as Bill and Ted leave the coliseum where the Battle of the Bands will take place, and at Joanna and Elizabeth's birthday party.
7	"The Perfect Crime"	Faith No More	Plays while the two Bill and Teds head to Vasquez Rocks park in the van.
8	"Go to Hell"	Megadeth	Plays as Evil Bill and Ted carry their human counterparts up Vasquez Rocks and kill them.
9	"Tommy the Cat"	Primus	Played by the actual band who are contestants for the Battle of the Bands in the film.
10	"Junior's Gone Wild"	King's X	Plays on the stereo of the red Porsche 911 that Evil Bill and Ted steal, at the moment Evil Ted identifies it on top of Vasquez Rocks.
11	"Showdown"	Love on Ice	Plays when the recently resurrected Bill and Ted leave Vasquez Rocks park for the "Builders Emporium," followed by the scene where Evil Bill and Ted drive to Missy's house.
12	"The Reaper Rap"	Steve Vai	Second closing theme.

=== Not included in the soundtrack ===
#	Title	Performer(s)	Notes
1	"Air Guitar Hell"	Steve Vai	A montage of guitar riffs used as the air guitar sounds throughout the film.
2	"Introducing the Wyld Stallyns"	Steve Vai	Acts as Wyld Stallyns' crude audition for the Battle of the Bands.
3	"Girls Mature Faster Than Guys"	Steve Vai	Plays briefly after Bill and Ted's meeting with Ms. Wardroe.
4	"For the Love (Of Music)"	Neverland	Played when ghost Bill and Ted return to their apartment to find it in disarray, and as their robotic duplicates attempting to take advantage of their fiancés.
5	"The Battle"	Steve Vai	Plays during the climatic showdown between the two Bill and Teds at the Battle of the Bands.
6	"Meet the Reaper"	Steve Vai	Plays with Death's short intro rap at the Battle of the Bands. Features William Sadler vocals.
7	"Final Guitar Solo"	Steve Vai	Acts as the now experienced Bill and Ted's performance at the Battle of the Bands, and the lead into Kiss' "God Gave Rock N' Roll to You II".

== Reception ==
Janiss Garza of Entertainment Weekly gave the music a B+, citing that the music comes pretty close to being totally excellent.
