= Dogman (album) =

Studio album by King's X
- Released: January 18, 1994
- Recorded: 1993
- Genres: Hard rock, alternative metal
- Length: 59:16
- Label: Atlantic
- Producer: Brendan O'Brien

King's X chronology
King's X (1992)	Dogman (1994)	Ear Candy (1996)

Singles from Dogman
- 1. "Dogman" Released: 1994; 2. "Fool You" Released: 1994; 3. "Pillow" Released: 1994; 4. "Pretend" Released: 1994

Dogman is the fifth studio album by American rock band King's X, released in 1994. It marks the band's second album under Atlantic and their first to not be produced by Sam Taylor; instead, the album was produced by Brendan O'Brien (who had recently worked with Pearl Jam, Stone Temple Pilots and The Black Crowes). Dogman signaled a heavier direction for King's X and, with strong approval from both critics and fans, is often considered one of their best works.

== Background and recording ==
According to frontman Doug Pinnick, while longtime King's X producer Sam Taylor had a big influence on the band's sound, he never captured the heaviness of their live performance in the studio. Taylor ended production duties with King's X after four albums. When the high-profile Brendan O'Brien approached King's X about creating an album together, the band enthusiastically accepted. In the end the band actually favored some of the demos over the final songs, and these would later be released as Dogman Demos in 2005. Nevertheless, working with O'Brien was a satisfying experience for King's X. In 1999, Pinnick described "Black the Sky" as his new "standard to mix to" due to its "big and fat" sound that simulated the band's live performance.

== Music and lyrics ==
Although their previous self-titled effort featured dark themes and aggressive musicianship, Dogman was considerably heavier than previous albums and marked a transition in the band's sound. In 1999, Doug Pinnick reflected, "For me personally, the Dogman record is what King's X really sounds like. The self-titled record was a step and an eye-opener and after that we could just make our music."

Along with the heavier sound - and in contrast to the occasionally uplifting Christian themes of earlier King's X albums - Pinnick's lyrics expressed his building frustration with religion. "[A]ll of the records", he stated in 2005, "are always me questioning 'Is this really it?' because I grew up in a religious family all my life and I have always been going: something ain't right here. So I have always sung about what I thought wasn't right - my confusion and my disillusion with it. And then finally when Dogman came out I just spewed it all out. I was pissed at that point. Everybody was like: 'he's not Christian anymore.' Everybody got freaked out."

== Touring and promotion ==
Dogman was promoted with performances including Woodstock '94 and opening slots for Pearl Jam, Mötley Crüe, the Scorpions and Type O Negative.

The album artwork by Leon Alvarado was released in four color variations: red, yellow, green, and blue.

The album's title track was its first single and music video. According to Doug Pinnick, "Dogman" received strong radio rotation in New York but the lack of a hit single hampered the album's commercial success. To date, "Dogman" remains King's X's last charting single, peaking at number 20 on the Mainstream Rock chart. The album produced three more singles: "Fool You", "Pillow" and the radio-only "Pretend", but none charted.

A concert in Dallas, Texas was filmed during the Dogman tour and released as a two-disc CD entitled Live & Live Some More via Molken Music in 2007.

== Critical reception ==
Professional ratings
Review scores
Source	Rating
AllMusic	4/5 stars
Collector's Guide to Heavy Metal	10/10
Entertainment Weekly	B−
Q	3/5 stars

Dogman was critically well-received upon its release. Chuck Eddy of Entertainment Weekly described the heavier sound as "less muddled than [King's X's previous] attempts at Beatles-derived psychedelic pop", and in a 4/5 star review, AllMusic's Alex Henderson praised the varied musical styles despite the album's heaviness, noting that King's X "addresses spiritual concerns without trying to force its beliefs on anyone."

== Accolades ==
Year	Publication	Country	Accolade	Rank
1996	Visions	Germany	"The Eternal Readers Charts"	31
"*" denotes an unordered list.

== Track listing ==
All tracks are written by Doug Pinnick, Ty Tabor and Jerry Gaskill, except where noted.

No.	Title	Writer(s)	Length
1.	"Dogman"		4:01
2.	"Shoes"		3:29
3.	"Pretend"		4:36
4.	"Flies and Blue Skies"		5:00
5.	"Black the Sky"		4:32
6.	"Fool You"		4:31
7.	"Don't Care"		4:39
8.	"Sunshine Rain"		4:35
9.	"Complain"		3:19
10.	"Human Behavior"		4:28
11.	"Cigarettes"		5:52
12.	"Go to Hell"		0:51
13.	"Pillow"		4:24
14.	"Manic Depression"	Jimi Hendrix	4:59

== Chart performance ==
Chart	Peak
Swedish Album Chart	46
Swiss Album Chart	47
UK Albums Chart	49
U.S. Billboard 200	88

Singles - Billboard (North America)

Year	Single	Chart	Position
1994	"Dogman"	Mainstream Rock Tracks	20

== Personnel ==
King's X

- Doug Pinnick – bass, lead vocals
- Ty Tabor – guitars, backing vocals
- Jerry Gaskill – drums, backing vocals

Production

- Recorded by Nick DiDia
- Mixed by Brendan O'Brien except "Manic Depression" mixed by Nick DiDia.
- Keyboards and percussion: Brendan O'Brien
- Recorded at Southern Tracks, Atlanta, GA.
- Assistant Engineer: Karl Heilbron
- Mastered by Bob Ludwig at Gateway Studios, Portland ME
- Art Direction: Leon Alvarado
- Design: Leon Alvarado, Randy Rogers
- Photography: Catherine Wessel
