= Out of the Silent Planet (album) =

Studio album by King's X
- Released: March 28, 1988
- Studios: Rampart, Houston, Texas
- Genres: Hard rock, progressive metal
- Length: 42:23
- Label: Megaforce
- Producers: Sam Taylor, King's X, Jon Zazula, Marsha Zazula

King's X chronology
Sneak Preview (1983)	Out of the Silent Planet (1988)	Gretchen Goes to Nebraska (1989)

Out of the Silent Planet (1988) is the second studio album by the American rock band King's X, and their first release under the King's X moniker.

The title of the album comes from that of a book by C. S. Lewis, an author favored by band members Ty Tabor and Jerry Gaskill. "Out of the Silent Planet" is also the title of the first track from the follow-up album Gretchen Goes to Nebraska. The cover art features the skyline of Houston with the southern outline of the state of the band's home of Texas.

The album received widespread acclaim from critics and musical peers, but was a commercial disappointment. Bassist Rex Brown of Pantera commented on how he and bandmate Dimebag Darrell both admired the album and listened to it repeatedly while "on a long road trip", and added: "This was the sound that Dime and I were always looking for."

== Critical reception ==
Professional ratings
Review scores
Source	Rating
AllMusic	4/5 stars
Collector's Guide to Heavy Metal	9/10
Kerrang!	5/5 stars

The Houston Chronicle noted that "the playing is ferocious, unencumbered with studio trickery, and the emerging vision elevates this music into its own sphere... If it 'has' to [be] considered heavy metal, it is the most original metal since Van Halen burst on the scene 10 years ago."

== Track listing ==
All songs written by Gaskill, Pinnick and Tabor, except "Sometimes" and "Far, Far Away" written by Pinnick, Tabor, Gaskill and Marty Warren.

No.	Title	Length
1.	"In the New Age"	5:23
2.	"Goldilox"	4:41
3.	"Power of Love"	4:57
4.	"Wonder"	4:13
5.	"Sometimes"	3:40
6.	"King"	3:01
7.	"What Is This?"	3:48
8.	"Far, Far Away"	4:14
9.	"Shot of Love"	3:15
10.	"Visions"	5:11

== Personnel ==
King's X

- Doug Pinnick – bass, lead vocals
- Ty Tabor – guitars, backing vocals
- Jerry Gaskill – drums, backing vocals

Production

- Sam Taylor – production
- Steve Ames – engineering
- Bob Ludwig – mastering at Masterdisk, New York
- Jon Zazula, Marsha Zazula – executive producers

== Charts ==
Album

Year	Chart	Peak position
1988	Billboard 200 (US)	144

== Accolades ==
Publication	Country	Accolade	Year	Rank
Kerrang!	United Kingdom	"Albums of the Year"	1988	1
Classic Rock & Metal Hammer	United Kingdom	"The 200 Greatest Albums of the 80s"	2006	*
