= Live All Over the Place =

Live album by King's X
- Released: November 2, 2004
- Recorded: November 2002 – March 2003
- Genre: Hard rock
- Length: 132:55
- Label: Brop! / Metal Blade
- Producer: King's X

King's X chronology
Black Like Sunday (2003)	Live All Over the Place (2004)	Ogre Tones (2005)

Professional ratings
Review scores
Source	Rating
AllMusic	4/5 stars
Classic Rock	3/5 stars
The Phantom Tollbooth	5/5 stars

Live All Over the Place, released in 2004, is the first official live album by King's X. A double CD set, it was also the band's final album for Metal Blade Records. It was the twelfth King's X album release.

== Track listing ==
=== Disc 1 ===
1. "Groove Machine" – 4:10
2. "Dogman" – 4:19 #
3. "Believe" – 6:40
4. "Little Bit of Soul" – 4:48
5. "Complain" – 3:16 #
6. Over My Head – 8:16 *
7. "Manic Depression" – 5:38 +
8. "Black Like Sunday" – 3:40
9. "Finished" – 4:01
10. "Screamer" – 4:30
11. "Johnny" – 8:21

=== Disc 2 ===
1. "The Difference" (acoustic) – 3:51 *
2. "(Thinking and Wondering) What I'm Gonna Do" (acoustic) – 4:06
3. "Mr. Evil" (acoustic) – 4:10 #
4. "Mississippi Moon" (acoustic) – 3:44 #
5. "Goldilox" (acoustic) – 5:02 *
6. "Everybody Knows a Little Bit" (acoustic) – 4:15 *
7. "A Box" (acoustic) – 4:06 #
8. "Talk to You" – 4:50 *
9. "Visions" – 6:03 *
10. "Cigarettes" – 8:28 #
11. "Summerland" – 3:47 *
12. "We Were Born to Be Loved" – 5:49 *
13. "Moan Jam" – 11:18 *
14. "Over My Head" (acoustic) – 5:25 (unlisted track) *

== Personnel ==
- Doug Pinnick – bass, lead vocals
- Ty Tabor – guitars, backing vocals
- Jerry Gaskill – drums, backing vocals

=== Additional personnel ===
- Jeff Ament – bass on "Manic Depression"

== Album notes ==
- All songs by King's X – Groove Ulysses Music ASCAP except:
  - * Jetydosa Music ASCAP – Written by Doug Pinnick, Ty Tabor, Jerry Gaskill and Sam Taylor
  - # X-Tra Cash Music ASCAP – Written by King's X – Administered by Mark-Cain Music, SOCAN
  - + Published by Bella Godiva Music, Inc, All rights reserved. Written by Jimi Hendrix
- Photos by Doug Pinnick, Jay Phebus, Katrina Plummer, Ray Odjeda, Stefan Beeking and Frank Seifert
- This CD was recorded at the sound board by Jay Phebus over many tours and years. Thanks for everything, Jay. Also, we would like to thank our many crew members who have kept the show rolling for over 23 years so far. We love everyone of you! Also, to those who have been asking for a live CD for many years... thanks for being there! And... see you again soon. This one's totally for you guys... flaws and all... just like you like it!
- Massive thanks to (ego) David Koblenz for the awesome website! Thanks also to Bri http://www.kingsxonline.com
- Thanks to MetalBlade Records in the US and Insideout Music everywhere else for hanging with us on this long ride.
- & Jeff Ament – bass on "Manic Depression". Jeff Ament appears courtesy of Pearl Jam / Ten Club
