= Gretchen Goes to Nebraska =

Studio album by King's X
- Released: June 27, 1989
- Studios: Rampart, Houston, Texas
- Genres: Hard rock, progressive metal
- Length: 52:20
- Label: Megaforce
- Producers: Sam Taylor, King's X

King's X chronology
Out of the Silent Planet (1988)	Gretchen Goes to Nebraska (1989)	Faith Hope Love (1990)

Singles from Gretchen Goes to Nebraska
- 1. "Over My Head" Released: 1989; 2. "Summerland" Released: 1989

Gretchen Goes to Nebraska is the second studio album by American rock band King's X. It is a concept album based on a short story written by drummer Jerry Gaskill. Having received strong critical praise and fan support, Gretchen Goes to Nebraska is considered among the best work of King's X and a seminal record within the progressive metal genre.

== Music and lyrics ==
Characteristic of the band's early material, Gretchen Goes to Nebraska features various lyrical Christian themes in tracks such as "Over My Head" but also criticism of televangelism in "Mission". It questions organized religion with reference to the burning of Giordano Bruno in "Pleiades". Musically, the album covers various styles; it emphasizes tight melodies and grooves while incorporating elements of gospel and psychedelia.

When asked about the truth behind the album's title, drummer Jerry Gaskill responded in a 1990 interview:

"It actually started as a joke. Six or seven years ago we were unloading the truck, and we were throwing out these silly album titles and one of our roadies just came out with that off the top of his head. So we just said 'Yeah, someday we're going to call an album that'. We just saw him on our last tour, and we told him, 'we named the album because you said that'; he didn't even remember it."

== Touring and promotion ==
King's X toured considerably in promotion of their second album. The band's second London performance at the Astoria was filmed via camcorder. In 2008, nearly twenty years after its recording, the sold-out concert would be released on the DVD Gretchen Goes to London. According to frontman Doug Pinnick, after the concert, a distressed Jerry Gaskill locked himself in a room, thinking he may have ruined the band's career. Despite this, Pinnick described the show as "real encouraging."

In keeping with current concert trends, in late 2009, the band expressed interest in performing Gretchen Goes to Nebraska in its entirety on tour. Pinnick elaborated, "We like the idea of doing the whole of that record with a great light show, as part of something we'd call An Evening With King's X. It wouldn't be a full-blown tour, playing every hell-hole for three months. But we'd select specific, quality venues, make it special for the fans."

The song "Over My Head", a soulful, metal groove, and the power ballad "Summerland" both had promotional music videos. The album's cover artwork is seen at the end of the latter video.

== Critical reception ==
Professional ratings
Review scores
Source	Rating
AllMusic	4.5/5 stars
Q	4/5 stars
Rolling Stone	4/5 stars

Gretchen Goes to Nebraska received virtually universal critical praise for its uniquely progressive musical approach and varied styles. AllMusic's Eduardo Rivadavia named it an AMG Album Pick, noting that it tops its "brilliant" predecessor by "taking their unique sound to unprecedented heights of invention and inspiration." Major publications such as Rolling Stone and Q also offered strong praise. Gretchen Goes to Nebraska also achieved high slots on various Albums of the Year lists, including No. 4 in Kerrang!. Kirk Blows, reviewer of British music newspaper Music Week, found presence of Jimi Hendrix "flavour" inside band's music but expressed an opinion that "overwhelming feature is the confident and self-assured manner in which King's X go about their duty, serving up bluesy, power rock complete with heart and soul."

Original Faith No More guitarist Jim Martin praised Gretchen Goes to Nebraska while speaking to MTV, saying "That was one of the only records of the so-called new bands that I really liked for quite a while. Heavy metal stalwart Devin Townsend called the album "One of The Five Albums That Made Me".

== Track listing ==
All tracks are written by Doug Pinnick, Ty Tabor and Jerry Gaskill, except where indicated.

No.	Title	Writer(s)	Lead vocals	Length
1.	"Out of the Silent Planet"		Pinnick, Tabor	5:44
2.	"Over My Head"		Pinnick	4:47
3.	"Summerland"		Pinnick	3:17
4.	"Everybody Knows a Little Bit of Something"		Pinnick	3:57
5.	"The Difference (In the Garden of St. Anne's-on-the-Hill)"		Tabor	3:08
6.	"I'll Never Be the Same"	Pinnick, Tabor, Gaskill, Marty Warren	Pinnick	4:56
7.	"Mission"		Pinnick	5:01
8.	"Fall on Me"		Pinnick	4:05
9.	"Pleiades"	Pinnick, Tabor, Gaskill, Dale Richardson	Tabor	4:41
10.	"Don't Believe It (It's Easier Said Than Done)"		Pinnick	3:07
11.	"Send a Message"		Pinnick	4:02
12.	"The Burning Down"		Tabor	5:35
Total length:				52:20

== Accolades ==
Publication	Country	Accolade	Year	Rank
Kerrang!	United Kingdom	"Albums of the Year"	1989	4
Tip	Germany	"Albums of the Year" (Henning Richter)	1989	8
OOR	Netherlands	"Albums of the Year"	1989	18
Sounds	United Kingdom	"Albums of the Year"	1989	38
OOR	Netherlands	"The Best Albums of the 80s"	1989	244
Hard Rock Magazine	France	"The Best Albums of the 80s"	1989	18

== Personnel ==
King's X

- Doug Pinnick – bass, lead vocals
- Ty Tabor – guitars, backing vocals, dulcimer, sitar, wooden flute
- Jerry Gaskill – drums, percussion, backing vocals

Additional musician

- Sam Taylor – pipe organ and "drawkcab" piano

== Chart performance ==
Chart	Peak
UK Albums Chart	52
US Billboard 200	123
