= King's X (album) =

Studio album by King's X
- Released: March 10, 1992
- Recorded: 1991
- Studio: Rampart Studios, Houston, Texas
- Genre: Hard rock, progressive metal
- Length: 50:01
- Label: Atlantic
- Producer: Sam Taylor

King's X chronology
| Faith, Hope, Love (1990) | King's X (1992) | Dogman (1994) |

Professional ratings
Review scores
| Source | Rating |
|---|---|
| AllMusic | 3/5 stars |
| Collector's Guide to Heavy Metal | 9/10 |
| Entertainment Weekly | A− |
| Q | 4/5 stars |
| Rolling Stone | 4/5 stars |
| Sputnikmusic | 4.5/5 stars |

King's X is the fourth studio album by American rock band King's X, released in 1992 through Atlantic Records. The album marked the end of the band's relationship with producer Sam Taylor.

== Track listing ==
All tracks are written by Pinnick, Tabor and Gaskill, except "Prisoner", written by Pinnick, Tabor, Gaskill, Taylor, and Marty Warren.

| No. | Title | Length |
|---|---|---|
| 1. | "The World Around Me" | 2:56 |
| 2. | "Prisoner" | 4:14 |
| 3. | "The Big Picture" | 5:03 |
| 4. | "Lost in Germany" | 4:52 |
| 5. | "Chariot Song" | 5:22 |
| 6. | "Ooh Song" | 4:01 |
| 7. | "Not Just for the Dead" | 4:47 |
| 8. | "What I Know About Love" | 5:38 |
| 9. | "Black Flag" | 4:01 |
| 10. | "Dream in My Life" | 4:57 |
| 11. | "Silent Wind" | 4:10 |

The European version of the album includes the song "Junior's Gone Wild" (3:08) as track 7, between "Ooh Song" and "Not Just for the Dead". That song is also featured on the Bill & Ted's Bogus Journey soundtrack.

== Accolades ==
In 2022, Guitar World ranked King's X #15 on their list of "The 30 Greatest Rock Guitar Albums of 1992".

| Year | Publication | Country | Accolade | Rank |
|---|---|---|---|---|
| 1992 | Musikexpress | Germany | "Albums of the Year" | 43 |
"*" denotes an unordered list.

== Charts ==
| Chart | Peak position |
|---|---|
| UK Albums (OCC) | 46 |
| US Billboard 200 | 138 |

Singles – Billboard (North America)

| Year | Single | Chart | Position |
|---|---|---|---|
| 1992 | "Black Flag" | Mainstream Rock Tracks | 17 |

== Personnel ==
=== King's X ===
- Doug Pinnick – bass, lead vocals
- Ty Tabor – guitars, dulcimer, sitar, Concertmate 650, backing vocals
- Jerry Gaskill – drums, percussion, backing vocals

=== Additional musicians ===
- Max Dyer – cellos
- Sam Taylor (billed as "Little Willie T.") – 'pianto', organ splatches
