= Black Flag (song) =

Single by King's X

from the album King's X
- Released: February 1992
- Recorded: Rampart Studios, Houston
- Genre: Hard rock
- Length: 4:01
- Label: Atlantic
- Songwriters: Jerry Gaskill, Doug Pinnick, Ty Tabor
- Producer: Sam Taylor

King's X singles chronology
"It's Love" (1990)	"Black Flag" (1992)	"Dogman" (1994)

"Black Flag" is a song by the American rock band King's X. It was released as a single in support of their 1992 self-titled album.

== Track listing ==
US CD promo single (PRCD 4461-2)

1. "Black Flag" (Jerry Gaskill, Doug Pinnick, Ty Tabor) – 4:01

== Charts ==
Chart (1992)	Peak position
US Mainstream Rock (Billboard)	17

== Personnel ==
Adapted from the Black Flag liner notes.

King's X

- Doug Pinnick – bass, vocals
- Ty Tabor – guitar
- Jerry Gaskill – drums, percussion

Production and additional personnel

- Steve Ames – engineering
- Tony Dawsey – mastering
- Sam Taylor – production

== Release history ==
Region	Date	Label	Format	Catalog
United States	1992	Atlantic	CD	PRCD 4461
