= It's Love =

Single by King's X

from the album Faith Hope Love
- B-side: "We Were Born to Be Loved"
- Released: 1990
- Recorded: Rampart Studios, Houston
- Genre: Hard rock
- Length: 4:34
- Label: Atlantic
- Songwriter(s): Jerry Gaskill, Doug Pinnick, Ty Tabor
- Producer(s): King's X, Sam Taylor

King's X singles chronology
"It's Love" (1990)	"Black Flag" (1992)

"It's Love" is a song by American rock band King's X from their 1990 album Faith Hope Love. It is the band's highest charting single, peaking at #6 on Mainstream Rock Tracks in 1990. The song is much noted for its Beatles-like sound. The picture seen on the front can also be found on the back of the booklet of the album Faith Hope Love.

== Track listing ==
1. "It's Love"
2. "We Were Born to Be Loved"
3. "Six Broken Soldiers (Extended Version)"

== Charts ==
Chart (1990)	Peak position
US Mainstream Rock (Billboard)	6
UK Singles (OCC)	94
