= GiveForward.com =

Former inline fundraising tool

- Website type: Online fundraising
- Website: www.giveforward.com
- Commercial: Yes
- Registration: Required
- Launched: 14 August 2008; 18 years ago
- Current status: Online

GiveForward.com was launched on August 14, 2008 in Chicago, Illinois. It was an online fundraising tool designed to help people raise money for the causes and organizations that they care about. GiveForward.com has become popular among the growing number of people who fundraise to help pay for a loved one's medical bills. The Chicago Tribune called it the "future of medical fundraising in the Internet Age." It now part of GoFundMe.

== Fundraising ==
Users have initiated fundraising pages on GiveForward.com to raise money for medical expenses incurred by a friend, a family member, or even a pet. In March 2009, two sisters used the site to raise $32,000 to pay for one sister's kidney transplant. After David Hartsock, a skydiving instructor, saved a woman's life after a parachute failure and became a quadriplegic, he raised over $150,000 on GiveForward.

The platform charges a 5% fee to campaign creators and a processing fee of 2.9% + $0.50 per transaction. The site has raised over $190,537,000 for its users.

== World Give Day ==
World Give Day was launched by GiveForward in 2010 for May 4 as "one day a year when people focus on giving. One day when people across the United States can join together to make a difference. One day, where every person, regardless of age or income level, can collectively have a huge impact. Whether people give money, time, resources, or random acts of kindness, it all helps."

GiveForward started an online and physical petition to support National Give Day. The purpose of this collection of signatures was to encourage the Mayor of Chicago, Richard M. Daley, to make May 4, 2010 the first National Give Day.

== Business Model ==
GiveForward.com, an American organization, has found a niche in the online fundraising industry by being one of few sites that allows people to fundraise for projects that are not affiliated with a registered 501(c)(3) (United States Internal Revenue Code). Due to the absence of this prerequisite, GiveForward cannot be designated a non-profit itself.

GiveForward operates as a for-profit company with a strong social mission.

== Fees ==
GiveForward.com platform charges 7.9% on all transactions, which includes the per transaction fee charged by credit card companies. This fee is the same as other online crowdfunding platforms.

== Founders ==
GiveForward was founded by Desiree Vargas Wrigley, a Latina serial entrepreneur in Chicago, and Ethan Austin.
