= King's X =

American rock band

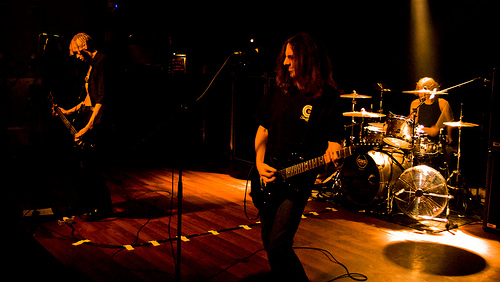
- King's X in 2009

Background information
- Also known as: The Edge (1979–1983); Sneak Preview (1983–1985)
- Origin: Springfield, Missouri, U.S.
- Genres: Hard rock; progressive metal; alternative metal
- Years active: 1979–present
- Labels: Megaforce; Atlantic; Metal Blade; Inside Out; Sony Music
- Members: Doug Pinnick; Jerry Gaskill; Ty Tabor
- Past members: Dan McCollam; Kirk Henderson (both during The Edge-era)
- Website: kingsxrocks.com

King's X is an American rock band formed in Springfield, Missouri, in 1979. They were first called the Edge and later became Sneak Preview before settling on its current name in 1985. The band's current lineup has remained intact for more than four decades, consisting of vocalist/bassist Doug Pinnick, backing vocalist/drummer Jerry Gaskill and vocalist/guitarist Ty Tabor. Their music combines progressive metal, funk and soul with vocal arrangements influenced by gospel, blues, and British Invasion rock groups. Despite a largely underground reputation as the "musician's musicians", King's X was pivotal in the early development of progressive metal, and produced a series of early records considered essential within the genre. The band's lyrics are largely based on the members' struggles with religion and self-acceptance. King's X was ranked No. 83 on VH1's 100 Greatest Artists of Hard Rock.

King's X has released thirteen studio albums, two official live albums, and several independent releases. After signing to both Atlantic and Megaforce Records in 1987, they broke into the mainstream with their first six albums, including their only top 100 charting albums Faith Hope Love (1990) and Dogman (1994). The band's most recent studio album, Three Sides of One, was released in 2022 on the InsideOut Music label. Since leaving Atlantic Records, following the release of Ear Candy (1996), King's X has released albums through Metal Blade Records, InsideOut Music and independently, respectively. Each member of the group has recorded several solo albums and has made numerous guest appearances on other artists' albums, as well as participated in numerous compilation projects. Pinnick and Tabor also have many albums released with side bands in which they participate.

The spiritual nature of the band's lyrics, particularly on their first four albums, has often led to them being labeled a Christian rock band, a label that the members have rejected.

== History ==
=== Early years (1979–1987) ===
The band traces its beginnings to 1979 in Springfield, Missouri, when bassist Doug Pinnick and drummer Jerry Gaskill were brought together to take part in a musical project coordinated by Greg X. Volz of the Christian rock band Petra. Within a month of Pinnick's arrival from Illinois, the project folded and he and Gaskill were left without a band. They soon landed a job as rhythm section for guitarist Phil Keaggy's live band. The two toured the country for several months in support of Keaggy's album Ph'lip Side. During the group's show in Springfield, Gaskill was approached by Ty Tabor who was a member of the opening band that night. The drummer for Tabor's band had quit the night before the show and Tabor had volunteered to take over on drums for the gig. However, seeing as he had no drums, he was forced to ask Gaskill if he could borrow his kit for the show. Gaskill obliged and the show went on.

When the tour ended, Pinnick and Gaskill returned to Springfield and set about looking for more work. Gaskill landed a job doing demo work for the Tracy Zinn Band, which happened to include Ty Tabor on guitar. The two became friends and were involved off and on together in different musical projects.

In early 1980, Pinnick attended a music show at Evangel College and watched a set by another of Tabor's bands. Pinnick was impressed with Tabor's skills and the two soon began collaborating musically.

Eventually Gaskill, Pinnick, and Tabor decided to pool their talents into a single outlet. Calling themselves the Edge, they initially were a four-piece with the inclusion of Dan McCollam on rhythm guitar. McCollam quit after only a brief time and was replaced by Kirk Henderson, who was a friend of Tabor's from Jackson, Mississippi. The group performed extensively on the Springfield bar and club circuit specializing in classic rock and Top 40 covers at the time.

By 1983, Henderson had quit the band and Pinnick, Tabor, and Gaskill decided to continue on as a trio. They also decided to change the name of the band, and settled on calling themselves Sneak Preview.

The group had been writing and recording many original songs up to this point. They chose ten of these songs to record for an independently released self-titled album in 1983. After the album's release, the band continued to tour and hone their songwriting skills.

By 1985, the group had made connections at Star Song Records based in Houston, Texas and were encouraged to move the band there. The first order of business for the three was to become part of a touring band for CCM artist Morgan Cryar. Tabor and Pinnick are also credited for co-writing several songs on Cryar's second album Fuel on the Fire in 1986. Tabor also performed some guitar parts on the album and both he and Pinnick are credited with background vocals.

However, when it came to signing Sneak Preview to a recording contract with Star Song, negotiations broke down and the deal came to a halt.

=== Megaforce era (1988–1991) ===
The group released its debut album as King's X, Out of the Silent Planet, in 1988. Despite highly positive reviews, the album did not fare well commercially and peaking at No. 144 on the Billboard album charts. The songs "King" and "Shot of Love" were released as singles, but failed to garner much attention. The album derives its name from the C. S. Lewis novel Out of the Silent Planet. This appears to be the band's first of multiple references to the British author. King's X promoted Out of the Silent Planet with its first major tour, playing with the likes of Cheap Trick, Blue Öyster Cult, Robert Plant, and Hurricane, as well as Megaforce labelmates Anthrax, Testament, M.O.D., and Overkill.

In 1989, the band released their second album Gretchen Goes to Nebraska. Considered by many fans to be their landmark album and most creative period, the album fared only slightly better from a commercial standpoint than Out of the Silent Planet. The band played with a wide variety of acts while touring in support of it, including Anthrax, Suicidal Tendencies, M.O.D., Living Colour, Billy Squier, and Blue Murder. The album contains many fan favorites such as "Summerland", "Mission", and "The Burning Down". The song "The Difference (In the Garden of St. Anne's-on-the-Hill)" appears to be another C.S. Lewis reference, this time to a scene in the book That Hideous Strength, third and final installment of the "science-fiction" trilogy begun by Out of the Silent Planet. The song "Pleiades" is credited by Ty Tabor as being the genesis of the King's X sound when he presented the demo to the other band members a few years earlier. Significantly, the song "Over My Head" received moderate airplay on MTV and radio.

The increase in exposure would prove beneficial when the band released their third album, Faith Hope Love, in late 1990. It was the group's first album to crack the U.S. Top 100, with the help of the successful single "It's Love". Another track, the funk-rock "We Were Born to Be Loved", enjoyed a long life on Late Show with David Letterman as a commercial bumper instrumental favorite of Paul Shaffer's CBS Orchestra. King's X was featured in the February 1991 issue of Rolling Stone (RS598). Still, with major mainstream success continuously eluding them, King's X began questioning Sam Taylor's management vision for the group.

The band landed the opening slot for Iron Maiden in Europe on their No Prayer for the Dying tour in late 1990, and AC/DC on their Razors Edge tour in the U.S. and Europe for the first half of 1991. In the middle of that year, their song "Junior's Gone Wild" appeared on the soundtrack to the movie Bill & Ted's Bogus Journey.

=== Atlantic era (1992–1997) ===
The band was moved up to Megaforce's parent label Atlantic Records for the release of their fourth album, King's X, in early 1992. However, rising tensions with Taylor led the band to eschew the upbeat approach of previous albums and turn out a darker, more introspective effort. Unfortunately, despite critical praise, their new style did not translate well among the record-buying public, thus garnering fewer sales than Faith, Hope, Love. "Black Flag", the album's lone single, received only moderate airplay on MTV and radio. Not long after the release of King's X, the band parted ways with Taylor. The details of the split were not made public, but it was believed to be rather bitter. Taylor would admit in 1996 that his company Wilde Silas MusicWorks was growing and, as a result, he was no longer giving King's X, whom he considered "the top dogs", the attention they deserved. In the aftermath, King's X took over a year off to consider their collective future together. The band members followed other, non-musical pursuits; most notably, guitarist Ty Tabor took up semi-professional motocross motorcycle racing.

With grunge at the peak of its popularity, and Pearl Jam's bassist Jeff Ament declaring that "King's X invented grunge" (despite the group's trademark sound being very different from that of the commercially successful grunge acts), the band went looking for a new sound upon their return. They enlisted veteran producer Brendan O'Brien, who had recently produced albums for Stone Temple Pilots and Pearl Jam. The resulting album, 1994's Dogman, showcased a much more muscular and heavy sound from the group, with Pinnick now handling all lead vocals and the lyrics becoming less abstract and spiritual. The record received a heavier promotional push from Atlantic including a compilation promotional CD entitled: Building Blox, as King's X enjoyed a successful tour, capped by an appearance at the Woodstock '94 festival in August. They also toured with bands such as the Scorpions, Pearl Jam, Mötley Crüe and Type O Negative, but despite a return to the Top 100 for King's X, the album failed to sell as well as Atlantic had hoped, and the label's support for the group quickly faded.

The band's third release under Atlantic, 1996's Ear Candy, would also be their last for the label (not including the subsequent Best of King's X compilation album). Although it sold to the band's sizeable core following, it lacked the relative mainstream success of previous efforts. The record was soon out of print, and it seemed that the group's chance for commercial success had come and gone.

=== Metal Blade era (1998–2004) ===
The group moved to Metal Blade Records in 1998. Their first album under the label, Tape Head, signaled a new era for the band. They modified their creative methods by writing and recording the album together in the studio, rather than coming together to record songs that the individual members had written separately. They also elected not to hire an outside producer and recorded the album at Pinnick's Hound Pound and Tabor's Alien Beans Studios, thus cutting production costs. Their next two albums, Please Come Home... Mr. Bulbous (2000) and Manic Moonlight (2001), were more or less created in the same way.

Manic Moonlight featured the band experimenting with electronic drum loops and other sounds for the first time on a record. The new direction, along with the relatively short length of the album, was generally not well received by longtime fans, but did get some positive critical reviews.

For their next album, 2003's Black Like Sunday, the group arranged and recorded an album of original songs that the band had regularly performed during The Edge and Sneak Preview days of the early 1980s. The cover art for this album was selected from artwork submitted by fans in an online contest.

The double-disc set Live All Over the Place (2004) was the band's final album for Metal Blade Records, and their first official live release.

=== Inside Out era (2005–present) ===
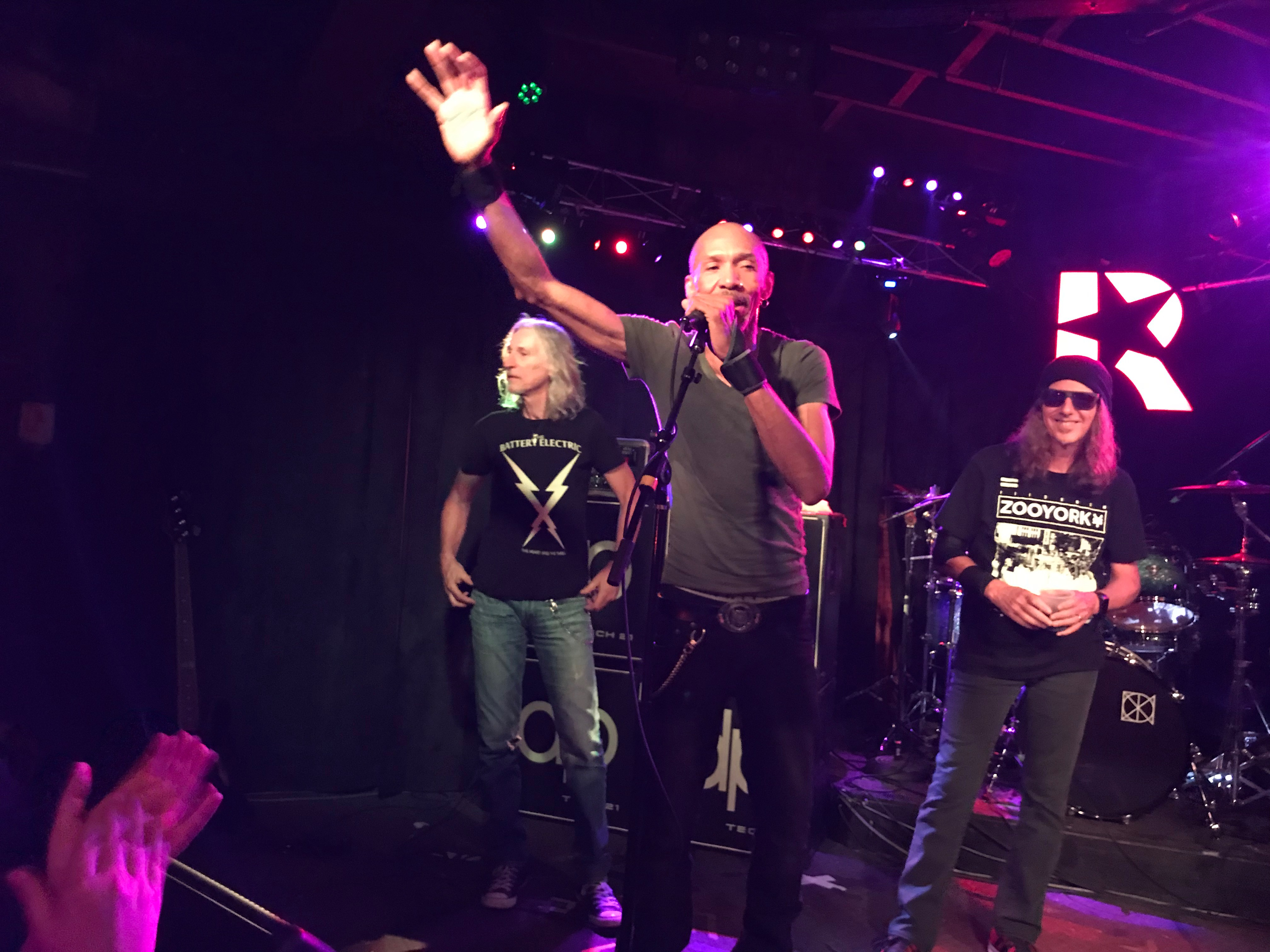
The band in 2018 (L to R: Gaskill, Pinnick and Tabor)

In 2005, King's X signed to InsideOut Music, the label that had previously released some of Tabor's side projects. The album Ogre Tones was released in September 2005 and was described by many as a return to a more "classic" King's X sound. It was produced by famed rock producer Michael Wagener (Dokken, Extreme, Stryper, White Lion, Skid Row) and recorded at Wageners WireWorld Studio in Nashville, Tennessee. The tour for Ogre Tones featured the band playing every song from the album during shows.

King's X again worked with Michael Wagener on its second album for InsideOut Music titled XV, released in May 2008. They spent mid-2008 touring with the band Extreme as part of a travelling version of the Rock 'n Roll Fantasy Camp. Live dates in the U.S. in December 2008 were followed by the band's first European tour in several years in early 2009.

Molken Music, an independent label started by Wally Farkas (ex-Galactic Cowboys) in 2005, has released several titles by King's X and its members. Live & Live Some More, a live concert recorded during the Dogman tour, is available there as well as demo compilations, rehearsal tapes, and other items. The label released the band's first live DVD, Gretchen Goes to London in November 2008. It was a live concert filmed in London in 1990. On January 22, 2009, their concert at the Electric Ballroom in Camden, London, was filmed and released as a live DVD and CD entitled Live Love in London.

On February 26, 2012, the 55-year-old Jerry Gaskill suffered a major heart attack, temporarily stopping the band's touring schedule. He was on a ventilator for several days while also suffering from pneumonia. In response, King's X compiled an exclusive live release from their archives entitled Burning Down Boston: Live at The Channel 6.12.91. The proceeds from the release went directly to Gaskill to help him offset his medical expenses. Gaskill posted a video message on Facebook on April 4, 2012, thanking everyone who had supported him during his illness.

The band went back to touring until Gaskill suffered another heart attack while recovering from a "scheduled minor procedure" on September 12, 2014, requiring him to undergo double-bypass surgery. King's X subsequently canceled all scheduled concerts, and announced an indefinite hiatus.

In mid-2015, the band was back on tour, playing numerous dates on the East Coast. They also played shows for July in Texas. In June 2015, Doug Pinnick announced that King's X were committed to begin work on a new studio album, their first since 2008's XV. The band signed a world-wide record deal on October 8, 2018, with Australian independent record label, Golden Robot Records, who had planned to release their new album in the U.S., Australia and Europe sometime in 2019; however, the project's release had faced myriad delays within the next few years, due to COVID-related manufacturing issues as well as the slow progress of the band working on the album, which had been mastered by April 2022. A month later, it was announced that King's X had signed again to Inside Out/Sony Music and their new album would be released on September 2, 2022. The band revealed Three Sides of One as the album's title on June 24, 2022; released on September 2 of that year, three singles were released to support Three Sides of One: "Let It Rain", "Give It Up", and "All God's Children".

Although Pinnick had initially stated that Three Side of One could be King's X's final studio album, he mentioned in an August 2022 interview that there were numerous songs that did not make the cut and could be used for the band's next album: "Ty came in with four, Jerry came in with three, and I came in with 27." He added, "We would play one of mine, one of Ty's, and one of Jerry's, then do another round. Ty wanted to keep going until they ran out. We needed more songs, so we played more of mine. We recorded ten of my songs, and only some of them got on the record. We knew some of those weren't quite ready, and we had enough songs. Maybe we'll put them on the next record. I still have about 30 songs. I know Ty and Jerry both have some more songs to use on the next record." In an October 2024 interview with Bravewords.com, Pinnick said that he has "submitted a handful of new songs" and "Ty and Jerry have both said they have a bunch of tunes" for the next King's X album, adding, "So, the next thing is to finally figure out when we want to get together and the whole thing you have to go through to make a record – because we live in three different parts of the country. So, sooner or later we'll get serious. We haven't yet really, but we talk about it – so that's a good thing."

An authorized biography by Greg Prato, King's X: The Oral History, via Jawbone Press was released in February 2019. In addition to extensive interviews with all three band members, the book included interviews with such rock musicians as Jeff Ament, Andy Summers, Mick Mars, Billy Corgan, and Eddie Trunk among others, and featured a foreword by Scott Ian.

== Legacy ==
The band's influence has been described as wide and diverse given "the impossible-to-categorize" nature of the genres and subgenres explored within King X's material, with the American popular culture publication D Magazine remarking in 2013 that "[t]heir fan base today is a mixture of prog-rock nerds and headbangers" while labeling the group itself as both "[f]ringe" and "[l]egends". In 1992, Michael Moses of Guitar World wrote, "The trio's unique blend of New Age metal and progressive soul has earned them critical acclaim as well as immense popularity. While the band's music clearly reflects their many influences—the Beatles, U2, Rush and Sly and the Family Stone—King's X ultimately sound like nobody but King's X." The band has a particularly positive reputation among professional musicians. For instance, Jeff Ament of Pearl Jam openly declared King's X as the true inventor of "grunge", as was mentioned above. In a retrospective interview with Billboard, Pinnick described an emotional, face-to-face moment with Dimebag Darrell, then of Pantera, in which the latter performer remarked "[d]ude, you know I love you" and "we love you" after the record industry controversy caused by Pinnick's coming out. Gaskill has stated that "I think I've come to realize that musicians do seem to be drawn to us," with him adding that he's "honored by it" and thinks that "it'll keep us around, because there's always going to be musicians." Other bands who have cited King's X as an inspiration or influence include Alice in Chains, Soundgarden, The Smashing Pumpkins, Dream Theater, Skillet, Devin Townsend and Soil.

In 2004, Guitar World wrote that, "Perhaps no other hard rock group has won such wide acclaim amid sluggish sales as King's X. With its irresistible blend of Beatles-style harmonies and Tabor's masterful metallic riffs, the group seemed poised to break out with each new release. On albums like Gretchen Goes to Nebraska and Brendan O'Brien-produced Dogman, Tabor's grinding power chords and incandescent solos are triumphs of the spirit."

During multiple decades of touring, King's X has performed with a number of prominent hard rock and heavy metal artists. Examples include past live gigs with opening slots for Sammy Hagar as well as a full touring bill with Krokus. They have also opened for bands like Cheap Trick, Iron Maiden, AC/DC, Scorpions, Pearl Jam and Mötley Crüe, and performed the first date of the Woodstock '94 festival.

== Solo and side projects ==
=== Doug Pinnick ===
Pinnick recorded two solo albums under the name of Poundhound, Massive Grooves... (1997) and Pineappleskunk (2001), while his subsequent releases Emotional Animal (2005), Strum Sum Up (2007) and Naked (2013) were credited as dUg Pinnick.

He has also been a member of several bands outside of King's X:

- Supershine featuring guitarist Bruce Franklin and drummer Jeff Olson both from the band Trouble. They released one self-titled album in 2000.
- The Mob featuring Reb Beach from Winger, Kelly Keagy from Night Ranger, and keyboardist Timothy Drury. They released a self-titled album in 2006.
- Razr13 is a project with members of the King's X road crew who released the album Reflections in 2009.
- Tres Mtns. with Jeff Ament of Pearl Jam and drummer Richard Stuverud released an album in 2011.
- Pinnick Gales Pridgen with Eric Gales and Thomas Pridgen released their debut album in 2013 and the follow-up album PGP 2 in July 2014.
- 3rd Ear Experience with vocalist/guitarist Robbi Robb released the digital EP Peacock Black in 2013 followed by the full-length album Boi
- KXM featuring guitarist George Lynch and drummer Ray Luzier
- Grinder Blues with Jeff and Scot Bihlman released their self-titled debut album in 2014.

Pinnick has also made numerous guest appearances on albums by bands including Dream Theater, 24-7 Spyz, Steve Stevens, Metal Allegiance and others. Beyond that he has appeared on several tribute albums to the likes of Metallica, AC/DC, Van Halen and more.

In August 2006, Pinnick stood in for lead singer Corey Glover on Living Colour's European tour.

=== Jerry Gaskill ===
Gaskill released a solo album in 2004 titled Come Somewhere which was produced by Ty Tabor.

He released his second solo album, Love and Scars, on October 30, 2015, which was produced by DA Karkos.

He also played drums on the entire Let It Go album by Galactic Cowboys in 2000.

=== Ty Tabor ===
Tabor has released seven solo albums to date: Naomi's Solar Pumpkin (1997), Moonflower Lane (1998), Safety (2002), Rock Garden (2006), Balance (2008), Something's Coming (2010), Trip Magnet EP (2010), Nobody Wins When Nobody Plays (2013), Alien Beans (2018), Angry Monk (2020), and Shades (2022).

Other bands Ty Tabor has been a member of are:

- Platypus, with Rod Morgenstein, Derek Sherinian, and John Myung, released When Pus Comes to Shove in 1998 and Ice Cycles in 2000.
- The Jelly Jam is an ongoing project with Rod Morgenstein and John Myung. They released The Jelly Jam in 2002, The Jelly Jam 2 in 2004, Shall We Descend in 2011, and Profit in May 2016.
- Jughead featuring two-time David Lee Roth drummer Gregg Bissonette, keyboardist Derek Sherinian, and singer and bassist Matt Bissonette released one album in 2004.
- Xenuphobe is an electronic/ambient project with former Galactic Cowboys member Wally Farkas. So far the pair have released the albums 1.0 in 2006, 2.0 Electrolux 2007, and Drone in 2015.

Like Doug Pinnick, Tabor has appeared on several albums as a guest performer by bands such as Ayreon, Lillian Axe, Queensrÿche and others.

== Religious views ==
All three members of King's X came from a background in Christianity and Christian rock (and, in Pinnick's case, church gospel singing) and have frequently been associated with the genre. This assumption has been reinforced by the Christian associations of the band's name, by the fact that King's X signed to Christian labels early in their career and because the Faith Hope Love CD insert contained an entire chapter of the Bible. However, the band has persistently resisted being identified or pigeonholed as a Christian rock or Christian metal band.

While many of their early lyrics have a clear spiritual influence, this came from the individual faith of the members rather than an explicit attempt to tap into the contemporary Christian music market in the way groups such as Petra did. Initially, many King's X albums were marketed through Christian book stores, but most of these stores refused to sell them following Pinnick's 1998 announcement of his homosexuality. Even at the time, the band welcomed this development as an opportunity to get away from the Christian rock "stigma".

A former Protestant, Pinnick has since openly discussed his agnosticism and his belief that Jesus Christ was not truly the Son of God. Gaskill has also disassociated himself from Christianity. During interviews in the early 2000s, Tabor continued to identify as a Christian, but referred to the Christian music industry as "vile".

In an interview in late 2021, Pinnick stated "For some reason, King's X [was considered] a Christian band. Maybe because that was our faith at the time; none of us are any more."

== Band members ==
Current members

- Doug Pinnick – bass, lead vocals (1979–present)
- Jerry Gaskill – drums, percussion, backing vocals (1979–present)
- Ty Tabor – guitars, backing & vocals (1980–present)

Former members

- Dan McCollam – rhythm guitar, backing vocals (1980)
- Kirk Henderson – rhythm guitar, backing vocals (1980–1983)

== Discography ==
=== Studio albums ===
Year	Album	US	US Christian	US Indie	UK
1983	Sneak Preview (as Sneak Preview)	—	—	—	—
1988	Out of the Silent Planet	144	—	—	—
1989	Gretchen Goes to Nebraska	123	—	—	52
1990	Faith Hope Love	85	31	—	70
1992	King's X	138	—	—	46
1994	Dogman	88	—	—	49
1996	Ear Candy	105	4	—	—
1998	Tape Head	—	—	—	—
2000	Please Come Home... Mr. Bulbous	—	—	—	—
2001	Manic Moonlight	—	—	19	—
2003	Black Like Sunday	—	—	13	—
2005	Ogre Tones	—	—	30	—
2008	XV	145	167	12	—
2022	Three Sides of One	—	—	—	—

=== Live albums ===
Year	Album
2004	Live All Over the Place
2007	Live & Live Some More
2009	Tales from the Empire
2010	Live Love in London
2012	Burning Down Boston

=== Compilation albums ===
Year	Album
1994	Building Blox
1997	Best of King's X
2023	In the New Age: The Atlantic Recordings 1988–1995

=== Singles ===
Year	Song	US Rock	Album
1988	"Shot of Love"	–	Out of the Silent Planet
1989	"Over My Head"	–	Gretchen Goes to Nebraska
1989	"Summerland"	–	Gretchen Goes to Nebraska
1990	"We Are Finding Who We Are"	–	Faith Hope Love
1991	"Junior's Gone Wild"	–	Bill & Ted's Bogus Journey: Music from the Motion Picture
1992	"World Around Me"	–	King's X
1994	"Fool You"	–	Dogman
1994	"Pretend"	–	Dogman
2000	"Marsh Mellow Field"	–	Please Come Home... Mr. Bulbous
2001	"False Alarm"	–	Manic Moonlight
2022	"Let It Rain"	–	Three Sides of One
2022	"Give It Up"	–	Three Sides of One

=== DVD ===
- Gretchen Goes to London (2008 Molken Music)
- Live Love in London (2010 Inside Out/EMI)
