= Ogre Tones =

Studio album by King's X
- Released: September 27, 2005
- Recorded: 2005
- Studios: WireWorld (Nashville, Tennessee)
- Genres: Hard rock, progressive metal
- Length: 51:32
- Label: Inside Out
- Producer: Michael Wagener

King's X chronology
Live All Over The Place (2004)	Ogre Tones (2005)	Live & Live Some More (2007)

Professional ratings
Review scores
Source	Rating
Allmusic	3.5/5 stars
The Phantom Tollbooth	5/5 stars

Ogre Tones is the 11th full-length studio album by American rock band King's X. Released in 2005, it is their first record on the Inside Out Music label.

== Reception ==
Greg Prato of AllMusic gave the album 3.5 stars of 5, saying that "While there are a few catchy tunes — especially the album opener, 'Alone' — for the most part, riffs 'n' ranting play a prominent role here." He added, "Not all of the lyrics hit the mark," citing a line from the song "Bebop" which apparently quotes "Tutti Frutti," by Little Richard.

== Track listing ==
No.	Title	Length
1.	"Alone"	2:57
2.	"Stay"	2:23
3.	"Hurricane"	3:31
4.	"Fly"	2:43
5.	"If"	2:58
6.	"Bebop"	4:00
7.	"Honesty"	2:42
8.	"Open My Eyes"	4:03
9.	"Freedom"	3:21
10.	"Get Away"	3:25
11.	"Sooner or Later"	7:00
12.	"Mudd"	4:41
13.	"Goldilox (Reprise)"	4:52
14.	"Bam"	2:43

== Personnel ==
- Doug Pinnick - bass, lead vocals
- Ty Tabor - guitars, backing vocals
- Jerry Gaskill - drums, backing vocals

=== Production ===
- Produced and mixed by Michael Wagener for Double Trouble Productions, Inc.
- Mastered at Alien Beans Studios by Ty Tabor
- Ryu Tashiro, assistant and additional engineering
- CD package design and illustration by Jeff Wood

== Charts ==
Year	Chart	Position
2008	Top Independent Albums	30
