= Jerry Gaskill =

American drummer

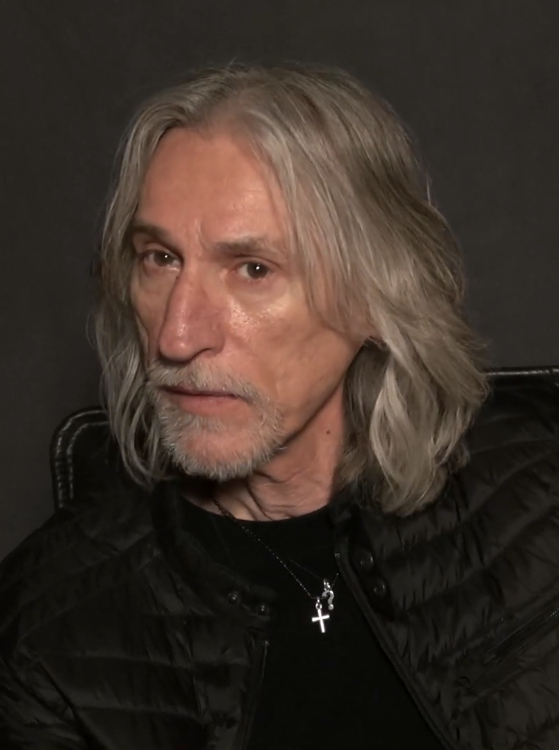
- Gaskill in 2019

Background information
- Born: December 27, 1957 (age 68)
- Genres: Hard rock, progressive rock
- Occupation: Drummer
- Member of: King's X

Jerry Wayne Gaskill (born December 27, 1957) is an American rock musician who is the drummer for King's X.

== Biography ==
Gaskill has been interested in making music and playing drums for as long as he can remember. His father bought him his first drum, a snare, at the age of four. From there, he pieced together a full kit.

He grew up in a very musical family with both his dad and brother being guitar players. The three actually started an all-instrumental band called Jerry and the Knights. Gaskill played his first bar gig when he was seven years old with this group and was paid $2 for his efforts.

Jerry and the Knights played at different functions such as talent shows, wedding receptions, parties and so on until his mid-teens. He then joined a local band called Frog Ocean Road who he had admired. Gaskill played with them until he was 18, at which time he had a self professed "Born Again" experience. He then became involved in the local Christian music scene playing at churches and jamming with other like-minded musicians.

In 1978, Gaskill decided to attend Evangel College in Springfield, Missouri and moved there with the intention of becoming a Biblical Studies major. He never lost the musical bug and was quick to involve himself in the local music circles. He was soon introduced to singer Greg X. Volz who was putting a new band together and asked Gaskill to participate. They also asked bassist Doug Pinnick to move to Springfield and join the band. Pinnick accepted, but a month after his arrival, the project fell apart.

Gaskill was soon asked, along with Pinnick, to join the Phil Keaggy band (presumably through Keaggy's previous work with Volz) which they accepted. He went on a national tour with Keaggy for about a year. During the band's show in Springfield, Gaskill was asked by a member of the opening band if he would lend them his drums. That person happened to be Ty Tabor who was filling in for the drummer who had quit the band the night before.

At one point, Gaskill became involved in a demo project for the Tracy Zinn Band that had Tabor as a member. The two hit it off and were later involved in other projects together.

After the Keaggy job, Gaskill and Pinnick (who had also been jamming with Tabor) decided to try getting their own band together. The group was rounded out by Tabor and guitarist Dan McCollam. They called themselves The Edge, then three years later Sneak Preview, which eventually morphed into King's X several years later. As the middle member of King's X, Gaskill is seven years younger than Pinnick and three-and-a-half years older than Tabor.

Gaskill enjoyed a long career with King's X and continues with them to this day. The album Gretchen Goes to Nebraska was based in part on a story that he wrote. He was a lead vocalist on 3 King's X tracks and is an integral part of their famous three-part vocal harmonies.

Gaskill suffered a heart attack on February 25, 2012, and was rushed to a hospital where he underwent emergency surgery. After his release from hospital he posted a video message on Facebook, thanking everyone who had supported him through his illness and then married his long term partner, Julie, in Las Vegas. In October of the same year, Gaskill's Sea Bright, New Jersey home was completely destroyed by Superstorm Sandy. An internet campaign, via GiveForward.com, to raise $25,000 was immediately launched.

According to the King's X Facebook page, Gaskill suffered another heart attack while recovering from a "scheduled minor procedure" on September 12, 2014, and was scheduled to get double bypass surgery within 72 hours. King's X canceled all future shows until further notice.

=== Projects ===
In addition to King's X, Gaskill has performed on the albums Let It Go by Galactic Cowboys, Red Line by the Texas blues guitarist Jay Hooks, Ty Tabor's solo album Safety, Black Sugar Transmission's 2007 debut album (helmed by Andee Blacksugar, who also played guitar in Gaskill's solo band in 2005) and Doug Pinnick's Poundhound albums and Supershine project.

Gaskill released a solo album, Come Somewhere, in April 2004. He sang all lead vocals as well as performed all drum, acoustic guitar, and some electric guitar tracks. It was produced by and featured his King's X cohort Ty Tabor, and was recorded at Tabor's Alien Beans Studios.

Gaskill released his second solo album, Love and Scars, on October 30, 2015, and was produced by DA Karkos.

== Complete discography ==
=== King's X ===
See King's X#Discography

=== Solo albums ===
- Come Somewhere (Inside Out Music, 2004)
- Love and Scars (Rat Pak Records, 2015)

=== Guest appearances ===
- Poundhound – Massive Grooves... 1998
- Galactic Cowboys – Let It Go 2000
- Supershine 2000
- Poundhound – Pineappleskunk 2001
- Jay Hooks – Red Line 2002
- Ty Tabor – Safety 2002
- Black-N-Blues-The Sale video 2005
- Bob Burger – Surprise Party 2006
- Black Sugar Transmission 2007
