= Geffen Records discography =

This is the discography of Geffen Records and its sister label DGC Records.

== 1980s ==
=== 1980-1984 ===
Year	Artist	Album	Notes	Refs
1980	Donna Summer	The Wanderer		
1980	John Lennon/Yoko Ono	Double Fantasy		
1981	Elton John	The Fox		
1981	Quarterflash	Quarterflash		
1981	Yoko Ono	Season of Glass		
1981	Donna Summer	I'm a Rainbow	This album was recorded for Geffen Records in 1981, but shelved and not released until 1996 on Mercury/Casablanca Records/Republic Records.	
1982	Sammy Hagar	Standing Hampton		
1982	Sammy Hagar	Three Lock Box		
1982	Original Cast	Dreamgirls		
1982	Asia	Asia		
1982	John Hiatt	All of a Sudden		
1982	Greg Copeland	Revenge Will Come		
1982	Peter Gabriel	Security		
1982	Elton John	Jump Up!		
1982	Adrian Gurvitz	Classic		
1982	Original Cast	Cats (Original London Cast)		
1982	Neil Young	Trans		
1982	Joni Mitchell	Wild Things Run Fast		
1982	Original Cast	The Little Shop of Horrors		
1982	Ric Ocasek	Beatitude		
1982	John Lennon	The John Lennon Collection		
1982	Donna Summer	Donna Summer		
1983	Original Cast	Cats (Selections From The Original Broadway Cast)		
1983	Original Cast	Cats (Original Broadway Cast)		
1983	Mac McAnally	Nothing but the Truth		
1983	Peter Gabriel	Peter Gabriel (reissue)		
1983	Peter Gabriel	Peter Gabriel Plays Live		
1983	Berlin	Pleasure Victim		
1983	Planet P Project	Planet P Project		
1983	Oxo	Oxo		
1983	The Plimsouls	Everywhere at Once		
1983	Madness	Madness		
1983	Wang Chung	Points on the Curve		
1983	Debra Hurd	Debra Hurd		
1983	Elton John	Too Low for Zero		
1983	Joan Rivers	What Becomes a Semi-Legend Most?		
1983	Asia	Alpha		
1983	Jr. Tucker	Jr. Tucker		
1983	Quarterflash	Take Another Picture		
1983	Neil Young	Everybody's Rockin'		
1983	Jennifer Holliday	Feel My Soul		
1983	Monte Video and the Cassettes	Monte Vidéo		
1983	Was (Not Was)	Born to Laugh at Tornadoes		
1983	John Hiatt	Riding with the King		
1983	Irene Cara	What a Feelin'		
1983	Preview	Preview		
1984	Whitesnake	Slide It In		
1984	Madness	Keep Moving		
1984	Hagar Schon Aaronson Shrieve	Through the Fire		
1984	Berlin	Love Life		
1984	Don Henley	Building the Perfect Beast		
1984	Australian Crawl	Semantics		
1984	Elton John	Breaking Hearts		
1984	XTC	Mummer		
1984	XTC	The Big Express		
1984	XTC	White Music (reissue)		
1984	XTC	Go 2 (reissue)		
1984	XTC	Drums and Wires (reissue)		
1984	XTC	Black Sea (reissue)		
1984	XTC	English Settlement (reissue)		
1984	XTC	Waxworks: Some Singles 1977-1982 (reissue)		
1984	The Sylvers	Bizarre		
1984	Donna Summer	Cats Without Claws		
1984	Black 'N Blue	Black 'N Blue		
1984	Eric Carmen	Eric Carmen		
1984	Sammy Hagar	VOA		
1984	Original Soundtrack	Gremlins EP		
1984	A Drop in the Gray	Certain Sculptures		
1984	Siouxsie and the Banshees	Hyæna		
1984	Siouxsie and the Banshees	The Scream (reissue)		
1984	Siouxsie and the Banshees	Join Hands (reissue)		
1984	Siouxsie and the Banshees	Kaleidoscope (reissue)		
1984	Siouxsie and the Banshees	A Kiss in the Dreamhouse (reissue)		
1984	Siouxsie and the Banshees	Juju (reissue)		
1984	Siouxsie and the Banshees	Once Upon a Time: The Singles (reissue)		
1984	Siouxsie and the Banshees	Nocturne (reissue)		
1984	Tom Robinson	Hope and Glory		

=== 1985-1989 ===
Year	Artist	Album	Notes	Refs
1985	John Hiatt	Warming Up to the Ice Age		
1985	Shooting Star	Silent Scream		
1985	Vitamin Z	Rites of Passage		
1985	Van Zant	Van Zant		
1985	Lone Justice	Lone Justice		
1985	The Style Council	Internationalists		
1985	Original Soundtrack	The Cotton Club		
1985	Original Soundtrack	Vision Quest		
1985	Lloyd Cole and the Commotions	Rattlesnakes		
1985	Original Broadway Recording	Whoopi Goldberg		
1985	Adam Bomb	Fatal Attraction		
1985	Illusion	Illusion		
1985	Neil Young	Old Ways		
1985	Peter Gabriel	Music from the Film "Birdy"		
1985	Mummy Calls	Mummy Calls		
1985	Asia	Astra		
1985	Jennifer Holliday	Say You Love Me		
1985	Joni Mitchell	Dog Eat Dog		
1985	Black N' Blue	Without Love		
1985	Gary Myrick	Stand for Love		
1985	Elton John	Ice on Fire		
1985	Quarterflash	Back into Blue		
1985	Madness	Mad Not Mad		
1985	Original Soundtrack	Silverado		
1985	Wang Chung	To Live and Die in L.A. (Soundtrack)		
1985	Kitarō	Astral Voyage (reissue)		
1985	Kitarō	Full Moon Story (reissue)		
1985	Kitarō	Millennia (reissue)		
1985	Kitarō	India (reissue)		
1985	Kitarō	Silver Cloud (reissue)		
1985	Kitarō	Asia (reissue)		
1986	Peter Gabriel	So		
1986	Jimmy Barnes	For the Working Class Man		
1986	Tommy Keene	Songs from the Film		
1986	Tommy Keene	Run Now		
1986	Aerosmith	Done with Mirrors		
1986	Siouxsie and the Banshees	Tinderbox		
1986	Lloyd Cole & the Commotions	Easy Pieces		
1986	Kitarō	Toward the West		
1986	Kitarō	Tenku		
1986	Ish Ledesma	On this Corner		
1986	Pat Metheny/Ornette Coleman	Song X		
1986	Lyle Mays	Lyle Mays		
1986	Ric Ocasek	This Side of Paradise		
1986	Models	Out of Mind, Out of Sight		
1986	Esquire	Esquire		
1986	The Style Council	Home and Abroad		
1986	Bill Cosby	Those of You With or Without Children, You'll Understand		
1986	Peter Case	Peter Case		
1986	Neil Young	Landing on Water		
1986	Dazz Band	Wild & Free		
1986	Black N' Blue	Nasty Nasty		
1986	Elton John	Leather Jackets		
1986	Wang Chung	Mosaic		
1986	It Bites	The Big Lad in the Windmill		
1986	XTC	Skylarking		
1986	Gene Loves Jezebel	Discover		
1986	Chameleons UK	Strange Times		
1986	Tesla	Mechanical Resonance		
1986	Berlin	Count Three & Pray		
1986	Lone Justice	Shelter		
1986	Debbie Harry	Rockbird		
1986	Ray Parker Jr.	After Dark		
1986	Original Soundtrack	Little Shop of Horrors		
1986	Sammy Hagar	Looking Back		
1986	Jesse's Gang	Center of Attraction		
1986	Slayer	Reign in Blood		
1987	Tom Scott	The Lonesome Sound		
1987	Victoria Williams	Happy Come Home		
1987	Vaneese Thomas	Vaneese Thomas		
1987	Y&T	Contagious		
1987	Ezo	EZO		
1987	Sammy Hagar	I Never Said Goodbye		
1987	Little America	Little America		
1987	Pat Metheny Group	Still Life (Talking)		
1987	Jimmy Barnes	Freight Train Heart		
1987	John Wetton & Phil Manzanera	Wetton/Manzanera		
1987	Siouxsie and the Banshees	Through the Looking Glass		
1987	Guns N' Roses	Appetite for Destruction		
1987	Fuzzbox	We've Got a Fuzzbox and We're Gonna Use It		
1987	Jennifer Holliday	Get Close to My Love		
1987	Original Cast	Les Misérables		
1987	John White	Night People		
1987	Elton John	Elton John's Greatest Hits Vol. III: 1979-1987		
1987	Neil Young & Crazy Horse	Life		
1987	Nitzer Ebb	That Total Age		
1987	Geoffrey Downes & the New Dance Orchestra	The Light Program		
1987	Robbie Robertson	Robbie Robertson		
1987	Original Soundtrack	Innerspace		
1987	Aerosmith	Permanent Vacation		
1987	Kitarō	The Light of the Spirit		
1987	Cher	Cher		
1987	Whitesnake	Whitesnake		
1987	Whitesnake	Come an' Get It (reissue)		
1987	Whitesnake	Live...In the Heart of the City (reissue)		
1987	Dukes of Stratosphear	Chips from the Chocolate Fireball		
1987	Gene Loves Jezebel	Promise		
1987	Gene Loves Jezebel	The House of the Dolls		
1987	Donna Summer	All Systems Go		
1988	Joni Mitchell	Chalk Mark in a Rain Storm		
1988	Whitesnake	Saints & Sinners (reissue)		
1988	Whitesnake	Snakebite (reissue)		
1988	Whitesnake	Trouble (reissue)		
1988	Whitesnake	Lovehunter (reissue)		
1988	Various Artists	Scream: The Compilation		
1988	Danny Wilde	Any Man's Hunger		
1988	Black 'N Blue	In Heat		
1988	3	To the Power of Three		
1988	The Sun & The Moon	The Sun & The Moon		
1988	Original Cast	Follies		
1988	Virginia Astley	Hope in a Darkened Heart		
1988	Vitamin Z	Sharp Stone Rain		
1988	Berlin	Best of Berlin 1979–1988		
1988	Jimmy Page	Outrider		
1988	It Bites	Once Around the World		
1988	John Kilzer	Memory in the Making		
1988	Mac McAnally	Finish Lines		
1988	Edie Brickell & the New Bohemians	Shooting Rubberbands at the Stars		
1988	Rock City Angels	Young Man's Blues		
1988	Steve Forbert	Streets of This Town		
1988	Kylie Minogue	Kylie		
1988	The 7A3	Coolin' in Cali		
1988	The Toll	The Price of Progression		
1988	Original Soundtrack	Beetlejuice		
1988	Slayer	South of Heaven		
1988	Lyle Mays	Street Dreams		
1988	Siouxsie and the Banshees	Peepshow		
1988	Peter Gabriel	Passion: Music for The Last Temptation of Christ		
1988	Kitarō	Ten Years		
1988	Danzig	Danzig		
1988	Guns N' Roses	G N' R Lies		
1988	Guns N' Roses	Appetite for Destruction (clean)		
1989	Masters of Reality	Masters of Reality		
1989	Blue Murder	Blue Murder		
1989	Nitzer Ebb	Belief		
1989	Andrew Dice Clay	Dice		
1989	Wolfsbane	Live Fast, Die Fast		
1989	Stan Ridgway	Mosquitos		
1989	Don Henley	The End of the Innocence		
1989	XTC	Oranges and Lemons		
1989	Christopher Williams	Adventures in Paradise		
1989	Tommy Keene	Based on Happy Times		
1989	Wang Chung	The Warmer Side of Cool		
1989	Nikki	Nikki		
1989	Tesla	The Great Radio Controversy		
1989	Junkyard	Junkyard		
1989	Michael Thompson Band	Michael Thompson Band		
1989	Little America	Fairgrounds		
1989	David Peaston	Introducing David Peaston		
1989	Maria McKee	Maria McKee		
1989	EZO	Fire Fire		
1989	Fuzzbox	Big Bang!		
1989	Chris Rea	The Best of Chris Rea: New Light Through Old Windows		
1989	Enya	Watermark		
1989	Various Artists	Greenpeace: Rainbow Warriors		
1989	Peter Case	The Man with the Blue Post-Modern Fragmented Neo-Traditionalist Guitar		
1989	Cher	Heart of Stone		
1989	Pat Metheny Group	Letter from Home		
1989	Rickie Lee Jones	Flying Cowboys		
1989	John Hiatt	Y'all Caught? The Ones That Got Away 1979-1985		
1989	Tommy Bolin	The Ultimate: The Best of Tommy Bolin		
1989	Whitesnake	Slip of the Tongue		
1989	Was (Not Was)	Born to Laugh at Tornadoes		
1989	Aerosmith	Pump		

== 1990s ==
=== 1990-1994 ===
Year	Artist	Album	Notes	Refs
1990	Conway Twitty	Crazy in Love	Music Video Only	
1990	The Simpsons	The Simpsons Sing the Blues		
1990	Kitarō	Kojiki		
1990	Lori Carson	Shelter		
1990	Olivia Newton-John	Warm and Tender		
1990	Gene Loves Jezebel	Kiss of Life		
1990	It Bites	Eat Me in St. Louis	US version	
1990	Hanoi Rocks	Bangkok Shocks, Saigon Shakes, Hanoi Rocks		
1990	Hanoi Rocks	Oriental Beat		
1990	Hanoi Rocks	Self Destruction Blues		
1990	Hanoi Rocks	Back to Mystery City		
1990	Hanoi Rocks	All Those Wasted Years: Live at the Marquee		
1990	Trouble	Trouble		
1990	Salty Dog	Every Dog Has Its Day		
1990	Original Cast	Miss Saigon		
1990	Kylie Minogue	Enjoy Yourself		
1990	Shadowland	Shadowland		
1990	Shadowland	Beauty of Escaping		
1990	The Creatures	Boomerang		
1990	Chris Rea	The Road to Hell		
1990	The Sundays	Reading, Writing, and Arithmetic		
1990	Black Crowes	Shake Your Money Maker		
1990	Don Dokken	Up From The Ashes		
1990	Thunder	Backstreet Symphony		
1990	Lock Up	Something Bitchin' This Way Comes		
1990	Death Angel	Act III		
1990	Danzig	Danzig II: Lucifuge		
1990	Gutterboy	Gutterboy		
1990	Y&T	Ten		
1990	Nitzer Ebb	Showtime		
1990	Warrior Soul	Last Decade Dead Century		
1990	Andrew Dice Clay	The Day the Laughter Died		
1990	Little Caesar	Little Caesar		
1990	Tesla	Five Man Acoustical Jam		
1990	Nelson	After the Rain		
1990	John Doe	Meet John Doe		
1990	Willi Jones	Willi Jones		
1990	Silk Tymes Leather	It Ain't Where Ya From...It's Where Ya At		
1990	Pat Metheny, Dave Holland, Roy Haynes	Question and Answer		
1990	Original Soundtrack	Days of Thunder		
1990	Brothers Figaro	Gypsy Beat		
1990	Notorious	Notorious		
1990	Sonic Youth	Goo		
1990	Asia	Then & Now		
1991	Cher	Love Hurts		
1991	Apollo Smile	Apollo Smile		
1991	Joni Mitchell	Night Ride Home		
1991	Robbie Robertson	Storyville		
1991	Edie Brickell & New Bohemians	Ghost of a Dog		
1991	The Posies	Dear 23		
1991	Northside	Chicken Rhythms		
1991	Slayer	Seasons in the Abyss		
1991	Original Soundtrack	Mermaids		
1991	I, Napoleon	I, Napoleon		
1991	The Throbs	The Language of Thieves and Vagabonds		
1991	Tyketto	Don't Come Easy		
1991	Junkyard	Sixes, Sevens & Nines		
1991	Copyright	©		
1991	John Kilzer	Busman's Holiday		
1991	Kitarō	Live in America		
1991	Bill Cosby	Oh, Baby!		
1991	Galactic Cowboys	Galactic Cowboys		
1991	Tesla	Psychotic Supper		
1991	Warrior Soul	Drugs, God and the New Republic		
1991	Michael W. Smith	Go West Young Man		
1991	Peter Gabriel	Shaking the Tree: Sixteen Golden Greats		
1991	Guns N' Roses	Use Your Illusion I		
1991	Guns N' Roses	Use Your Illusion II		
1991	Nirvana	Nevermind		
1991	Neil Young	Lucky Thirteen		
1991	Yasmin	Yasmin		
1992	Arc Angels	Arc Angels		
1992	Peter Gabriel	Us		
1992	Nirvana	Incesticide		
1992	Thunder	Laughing on Judgement Day		
1992	Little Caesar	Influence		
1992	Izzy Stradlin	Izzy Stradlin and the Ju Ju Hounds		
1992	Warrior Soul	Salutations from the Ghetto Nation		
1992	Jackyl	Jackyl		
1992	Roxy Blue	Want Some?		
1992	Cher	Greatest Hits: 1965–1992	Non-US release	
1993	Blue Murder	Nothin' But Trouble		
1993	Coverdale/Page	Coverdale•Page		
1993	Galactic Cowboys	Space In Your Face		
1993	Counting Crows	August and Everything After		
1993	St. Johnny	Speed Is Dreaming		
1993	Nirvana	In Utero		
1993	Eleanor McEvoy	Eleanor McEvoy (album)		
1993	Guns N' Roses	"The Spaghetti Incident?"		
1993	Duff McKagan	Believe in Me		
1993	Pariah	To Mock a Killingbird		
1993	Warrior Soul	Chill Pill		
1993	Phantom Blue	Built to Perform		
1993	Aerosmith	Get a Grip		
1993	Noa	Noa		
1993	Various Artists	The Beavis and Butt-Head Experience		
1994	Weezer	Weezer		
1994	Aerosmith	Big Ones		
1994	Pride & Glory	Pride & Glory		
1994	Tesla	Bust a Nut		
1994	Whitesnake	Whitesnake's Greatest Hits		
1994	Jackyl	Push Comes to Shove		
1994	Sammy Hagar	Unboxed		
1994	Peter Gabriel	Secret World Live		
1994	Slash's Snakepit	It's Five O'Clock Somewhere		
1994	Eagles	Hell Freezes Over		
1994	Nirvana	Unplugged in New York		
1994	Hole	Live Through This		

=== 1990-1994 ===
Year	Artist	Album	Notes	Refs
1995	Lisa Loeb & Nine Stories	Tails		
1995	Don Henley	Actual Miles: Henley's Greatest Hits		
1995	Tesla	Times Makin' Changes - The Best of Tesla		
1995	GZA	Liquid Swords		
1996	Beck	Odelay		
1996	Counting Crows	Recovering the Satellites		
1996	Nirvana	From the Muddy Banks of the Wishkah		
1996	Motier Arina	Motier		
1996	Manowar	Louder Than Hell		
1996	Weezer	Pinkerton		
1997	10,000 Maniacs	Love Among the Ruins		
1997	Wang Chung	Everybody Wang Chung Tonight: Wang Chung's Greatest Hits		
1997	Bloodhound Gang	One Fierce Beer Coaster		
1997	Lisa Loeb	Firecracker		
1997	Southern Culture on the Skids	Plastic Seat Sweat		
1997	Quarterflash	Harden My Heart: The Best of Quarterflash		
1997	60ft. Dolls	The Big 3		
1997	Snot	Get Some		
1997	Whiskeytown	Strangers Almanac		
1998	Beck	Mutations		
1998	Aerosmith	A Little South of Sanity		
1998	Counting Crows	Across a Wire: Live in New York City		
1998	Izzy Stradlin	117"		
1998	Killah Priest	Heavy Mental		
1998	Jackyl	Choice Cuts		
1998	Whiskeytown	Faithless Street (reissue)		
1998	Pitchshifter	www.pitchshifter.com		
1998	Pure Sugar	Pure Sugar		
1998	Hole	Celebrity Skin		
1998	Rob Zombie	Hellbilly Deluxe		
1998	Phantom Planet	Phantom Planet Is Missing		
1999	Counting Crows	This Desert Life		
1999	Izzy Stradlin	Ride On		
1999	Motier Arina	Soberity		

== 2000s ==
=== 2000-2004 ===
Year	Artist	Album	Notes	Refs
2000	Lifehouse	No Name Face		
2000	Guns N' Roses	Live Era '87-'93		
2000	Cold	13 Ways to Bleed on Stage		
2001	Weezer	Weezer		
2001	Motier Arina	Greeny		
2002	Lifehouse	Stanley Climbfall		
2002	Weezer	Maladroit		
2002	Trust Company	The Lonely Position of Neutral		
2002	Counting Crows	Hard Candy		
2002	Peter Gabriel	Up		
2002	Beck	Sea Change		
2002	Cinder	"Soul Creation" (single)		
2002	Nirvana	Nirvana		
2002	Jimmy Fallon	The Bathroom Wall		
2003	Blink-182	Blink-182		
2003	Lo-Pro	Lo-Pro		
2004	Various Artists	Shrek 2: Motion Picture Soundtrack	DreamWorks/Geffen	
2004	The Cure	The Cure	I AM/Geffen	
2004	Ashlee Simpson	Autobiography		
2004	Rise Against	Siren Song of the Counter Culture		
2004	Motier Arina	De Sapo		
2004	Papa Roach	Getting Away with Murder		
2004	Various Artists	Shark Tale: Motion Picture Soundtrack	DreamWorks/UMG Soundtracks	

=== 2005-2009 ===
Year	Artist	Album	Notes	Refs
2005	Lifehouse	Lifehouse		
2005	The Starting Line	Based on a True Story		
2005	Weezer	Make Believe		
2005	Common	Be	GOOD/Geffen	
2005	Hush	Bulletproof		
2005	Shaggy	Clothes Drop		
2005	Ashlee Simpson	I Am Me		
2005	Blink-182	Greatest Hits		
2005	Mary J. Blige	The Breakthrough		
2006	Angels & Airwaves	We Don't Need to Whisper	Suretone/Geffen	
2006	Rise Against	The Sufferer & the Witness		
2006	Papa Roach	The Paramour Sessions		
2006	The Game	Doctor's Advocate		
2006	Snoop Dogg	Tha Blue Carpet Treatment		
2006	Motier Arina	Ocupada		
2006	Nelly Furtado	Loose	Mosley/Geffen	
2006	New Found Glory	Coming Home		
2007	Lifehouse	Who We Are		
2007	Common	Finding Forever	GOOD/Geffen	
2007	Various Artists	Bratz: Motion Picture Soundtrack		
2007	Angels & Airwaves	I-Empire	Suretone/Geffen	
2007	Mary J. Blige	Growing Pains		
2007	Keyshia Cole	Just Like You	Interscope/Geffen/Confidential	
2008	The Cure	4:13 Dream	I AM/Geffen	
2008	Kardinal Offishall	Not 4 Sale	KonLive/Black Jays/Geffen	
2008	Snoop Dogg	Ego Trippin'	Doggystyle/Geffen	
2008	Solange Knowles	Sol-Angel and the Hadley St. Dreams	Music World/Geffen	
2008	The Game	LAX	Black Wall Street/Geffen	
2008	Guns N' Roses	Chinese Democracy		
2008	Ashlee Simpson	Bittersweet World		
2008	Common	Universal Mind Control	GOOD/Geffen	
2008	Tesla	Forever More		
2008	Keyshia Cole	A Different Me		
2008	Shirley Bassey	The Performance		
2009	Orianthi	Believe		
2009	Weezer	Raditude	DGC/Interscope/Geffen	

== 2010s ==
=== 2010-2014 ===
Year	Artist	Album	Notes	Refs
2010	Keyshia Cole	Calling All Hearts		
2010	Lifehouse	Smoke & Mirrors		
2010	The Like	Release Me		
2011	Greyson Chance	Hold On 'til the Night	eleveneleven/Maverick/Geffen/Streamline	
2011	The Game	The R.E.D. Album	Black Wall Street/DGC	
2011	Robin Thicke	Love After War	Star Trak/Geffen	
2011	Blink-182	Neighborhoods	DGC/Interscope	
2012	Keyshia Cole	Woman to Woman	Geffen/Interscope	
2012	Lifehouse	Almería		
2012	The Game	Jesus Piece	Black Wall Street/DGC	

=== 2015-2019 ===
Year	Artist	Album	Notes	Refs
2018	Yungblud	21st Century Liability	Locomotion/Geffen/Interscope	
2018	Jacob Collier	Djesse Vol. 1	Hajanga/Geffen/Decca	
2019	DJ Snake	Carte Blanche		
2019	Gryffin	Gravity	Darkroom/Geffen	
2019	Jacob Collier	Djesse Vol. 2	Hajanga/Geffen/Decca	

== 2020s ==
=== 2020-2024 ===
Year	Artist	Album	Notes	Refs
2020	Lil Durk	Just Cause Y'all Waited 2	Only the Family/Alamo/Geffen	
2020	Smokepurpp	Florida Jit	Alamo/Geffen	
2020	Hotboii	Double O Baby	Geffen/Interscope/Rebel/Hitmaker/22	
2020	Lil Durk	The Voice	Only the Family/Alamo/Geffen	
2021	Smokepurpp	PSYCHO (Legally Insane) EP	Alamo/Geffen	
2021	Olivia Rodrigo	Sour		
2021	SpotemGottem	Most Wanted	Rebel/Geffen	
2021	SpotemGottem	Back From The Dead	Rebel/Geffen	
2021	Lil Huddy	Teenage Heartbreak	Immersive/Sandlot/Geffen	
2021	Hotboii	Life Of A Hotboii	Rebel/Hitmaker/22/Geffen	
2021	Ann Marie	Hate Love		
2022	Yeat	2 Alive	Geffen/Field Trip/Twizzy Rich	
2023	Olivia Rodrigo	Guts		

== Unreleased albums ==
Artist	Album	Notes	Refs
Large Professor	The LP		
Shirley Bassey	The Performance		
