= List of glam metal bands and artists =

The following list of glam metal bands and artists includes bands and artists that have been described as glam metal or its interchangeable terms, hair metal, hair band, pop metal and lite metal by professional journalists at some stage in their career. Glam metal is a subgenre of heavy metal and is influenced by 1970s glam rock. Glam metal groups wear "flashy clothing, heavy makeup, and large, teased hair".

Contents
Glam metal bands and artists: A B C D E F G H I J K L M N O P Q R S T U V W X Y Z

== Glam metal bands and artists ==
=== A ===
- Accept (David Reece Era)
- Aerosmith (1987–2001)
- Alias
- Alice N' Chains
- Alien
- Alleycat Scratch
- Ampage
- Autograph

=== B ===
- Babylon A.D.
- Bad City
- Bad Company (1986–1990)
- Bad English
- Bad4Good
- Badlands
- Bangalore Choir
- Bang Camaro
- Bang Tango
- Barren Cross
- Baton Rouge
- Beautiful Creatures
- Beggars & Thieves
- Nuno Bettencourt
- Bitch (as Betsy)
- Billy Squier
- Black 'n Blue
- Blackfoot (Siogo era)
- Black Veil Brides
- Blessed by a Broken Heart
- Blonz
- Bloodgood
- Blue Murder
- Adam Bomb
- Bon Jovi
- Bonfire
- Bonham
- Brain Donor
- Bride
- Brides of Destruction
- Brighton Rock
- Britny Fox
- BulletBoys

=== C ===
- Candy Harlots
- Casablanca
- Child's Play
- China (1988–1991)
- Cinderella
- Circus of Power
- Contraband
- Alice Cooper (late 1980s/early 1990s work)
- David Coverdale
- Crashdïet
- Crazy Lixx
- Cry Wolf
- Cycle Sluts from Hell

=== D ===
- D.A.D.
- Damn Yankees
- Danger Danger
- Dangerous Toys
- The Darkness
- The Datsuns
- Def Leppard
- Diamond Nights
- Diamond Rexx
- Diemonds
- Dirty Looks
- Dirty Penny
- Divlje Jagode
- D'Molls
- Dokken

=== E ===
- Easy Action
- Electric Angels
- Electric Boys
- Enuff Z'Nuff
- Europe
- Every Mother's Nightmare
- Extreme
- Ezo

=== F ===
- Faster Pussycat
- Fastway
- Femme Fatale
- FireHouse
- Lita Ford
- Frehley's Comet

=== G ===
- Giant
- Giuffria
- Gorky Park (early work)
- Gotthard
- Great White
- Griva
- Guardian
- Guns N' Roses

=== H ===
- Sammy Hagar
- Hagar Schon Aaronson Shrieve
- Hanoi Rocks
- Hardcore Superstar
- Harem Scarem
- H.E.A.T
- Heaven's Edge
- Helix
- Hollywood Rose
- Holy Soldier
- Honeymoon Suite
- House of Lords
- Hurricane

=== I ===
- Icon
- It's Alive

=== J ===
- Jackyl
- Jailhouse
- Jetboy
- Johnny Crash
- Judas Priest (Turbo Album)
- Junkyard

=== K ===
- Karizma
- Keel
- Kick Axe
- Kik Tracee
- Killer Dwarfs
- King Kobra
- Kingdom Come
- Kiss
- Kissin' Dynamite
- Kix
- Krokus (80s work)

=== L ===
- L.A. Guns
- The Last Vegas
- Leviticus
- Lillian Axe
- Lion
- Little Caesar
- Lizzy Borden
- London
- Lord Tracy
- Loudness
- Love/Hate
- Lynam
- Lynch Mob

=== M ===
- Madam X
- Magdallan
- Yngwie Malmsteen
- Manic Street Preachers (Generation Terrorists and Gold Against the Soul era)
- McAuley Schenker Group
- McQueen Street
- Michael Monroe
- Mötley Crüe
- Montrose (Mean era)
- Mr. Big
- Murderdolls

=== N ===
- Nasty Idols
- Vince Neil
- Nelson
- Night Ranger
- Nitro
- Aldo Nova
- Ted Nugent (Penetrator era)
- The Nymphs

=== O ===
- Odin
- Ozzy Osbourne
- Osmi Putnik
- Osvajači

=== P ===
- Pantera (1980s work)
- Poison
- The Poodles
- Pretty Boy Floyd
- Pretty Maids
- Phantom Blue
- Pandoras (late 1980s work)

=== Q ===
- Quiet Riot (1986–1988)
- The Quireboys

=== R ===
- Ratt
- Reckless Love
- Return
- Rock City Angels
- David Lee Roth
- Rough Cutt
- Roxx Gang
- Roxus
- Roxy Blue

=== S ===
- Sacred Warrior
- Saigon Kick
- Saints & Sinners
- Santa Cruz
- Saraya
- Satanicide
- Scorpions
- The Scream
- Sea Hags
- Seventh Key
- Shark Island
- Paul Shortino
- Shotgun Messiah
- Shout
- Sister
- Skid Row
- Slaughter
- Mark Slaughter
- Sleeze Beez
- Sleze
- Slik Toxik
- Smashed Gladys
- Sons of Angels
- SouthGang
- Spinal Tap
- Spread Eagle
- Stage Dolls
- Steeler
- Steelheart
- Steel Panther
- Stryken
- Stryper

=== T ===
- Takara (Eternal Faith era)
- Tesla
- Thor
- Tigertailz
- TNT
- Tokyo Blade (Ain't Misbehavin' era)
- Tora Tora
- Towers of London
- Treat
- T-Ride
- Toto (1984–1989)
- Triumph (Thunder Seven era)
- Trixter
- T.S.O.L.
- Tuff
- Twisted Sister
- Tyketto
- Steven Tyler

=== U ===
- Ugly Kid Joe

=== V ===
- Vain
- Vains of Jenna
- Van Halen
- Vanadium (late 1980s work)
- Vandal
- Vandenberg (Alibi era)
- Vinnie Vincent Invasion
- Vixen

=== W ===
- War Babies
- Warlock
- Warrant
- W.A.S.P.
- We Are Harlot
- Whitecross (1987–1994)
- Whitesnake
- White Lion
- White Tiger
- Wig Wam
- Winger
- Winter Rose
- Wrathchild

=== X ===
- X Japan
- X-Sinner
- XYZ

=== Y ===
- Y&T (1984–1990)

=== Z ===
- Zebra
- The Zeros

== See also ==
- List of glam metal albums and songs
- List of glam rock artists
