= Zetra (band) =

British rock duo

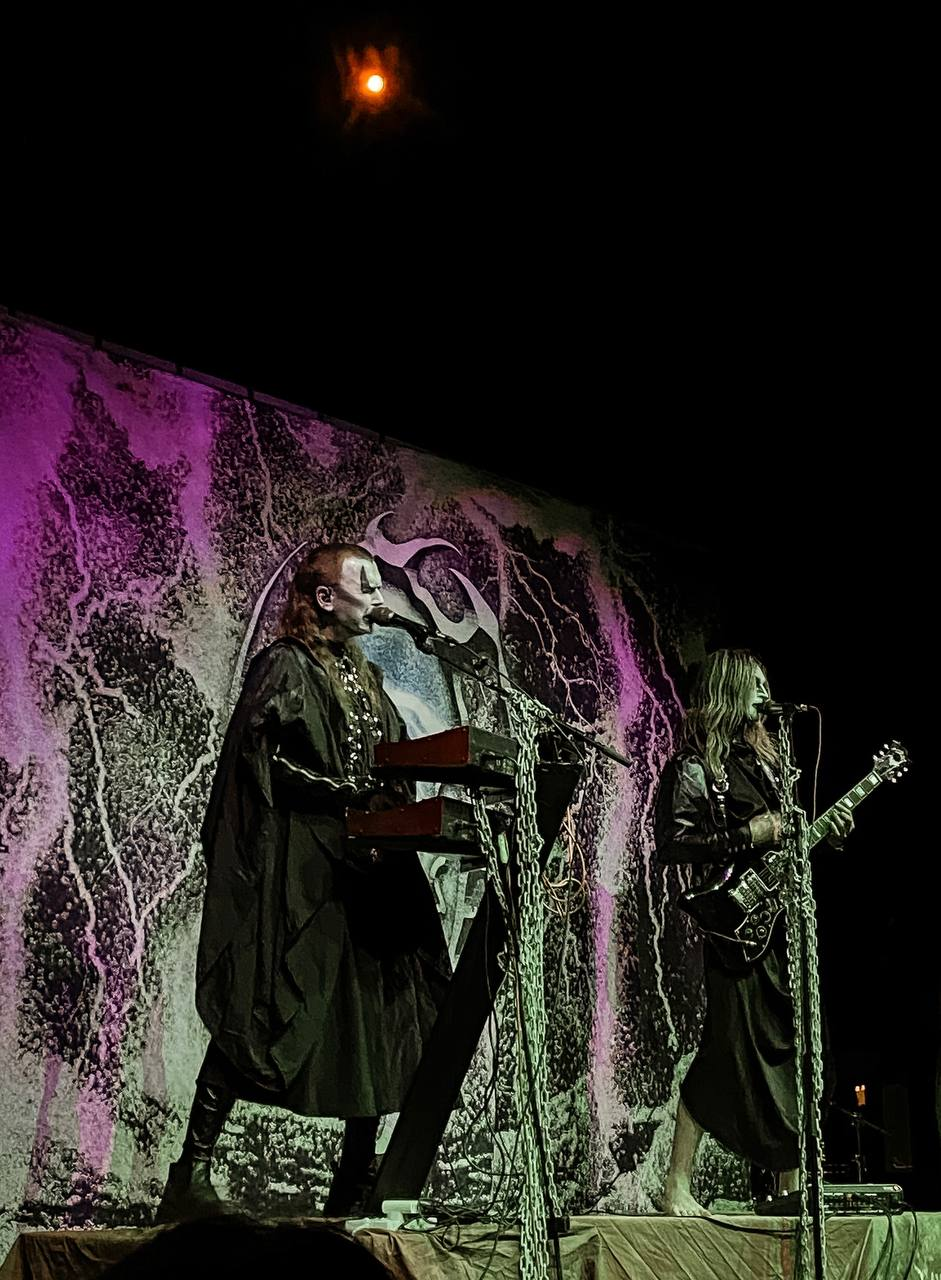
- Zetra performing in London in 2024

Background information
- Origin: London, England
- Genres: Gothic rock; shoegaze; gothic metal; electronic rock
- Years active: 2018–present
- Labels: Children of the Vortex; Church Road; Death Waltz; Nuclear Blast
- Members: Adam Saunderson; Jordan Page
- Website: www.wearezetra.com

Zetra are a British rock duo from London. Formed in 2018, the band released several independent EPs and cassettes via Bandcamp before signing to Nuclear Blast Records in 2023. The band's eponymous debut album, Zetra, was released on 13 September 2024.

== History ==
=== 2018–2022: Formation and early releases ===
Zetra was formed in London in the summer of 2018 by Adam (guitar/vocals) and Jordan (synthesizers/vocals). Both members had played in heavier bands prior to its formation; Jordan said that the project emerged "from a set of riffs we were throwing back and forth between each other that didn’t fit into anything we’d done before." The duo would go on to release several EPs on Bandcamp, a number of them which were given a limited release on cassette. In May 2020, Zetra released the two-volume With Your Demons collection, featuring demos written during the first few months of the COVID-19 pandemic lockdowns. A limited double cassette release featuring both volumes sold out within the first week of its release. The band recorded directly to cassette as it "fills everything with a nervous energy", according to Jordan.

In July 2020, Zetra released their eponymous debut EP through Death Waltz Records. It is a concept album about Soviet astronaut Vladimir Komarov. Having been partially reworked into other projects, this EP is now no longer available online. Due to the COVID-19 pandemic, all works released in 2020 were written and produced in isolation and Zetra were unable to perform them live during this time. In June 2021, Zetra supported the band Video Nasties for three shows in the UK. In September 2021, Zetra released the From Within EP. A follow-up EP, From Without, was released in January 2022 through Church Road Records. Between March and April 2022, the band opened for Unto Others on their UK and Ireland tour that year. The band also opened for Employed to Serve at two of their shows in May 2022. The band also played at the 2022 Roadburn Festival in the Netherlands in April, and at the ArcTanGent festival in August. On 4 November 2022, the band opened for Creeper at the Roundhouse in London.

=== 2023–present: Zetra ===
On 20 January 2023, Zetra opened for Godflesh and Author & Punisher at the 229 in London. In February, they supported Author & Punisher on his UK tour. Between 20 May and 26 May 2023, Zetra opened for A.A. Williams on the UK dates of her 2023 UK & Europe tour. Zetra also performed at the Desertfest in London, and on the Sophie Lancaster stage of the 2023 Bloodstock Open Air festival. On 21 October 2023, the band opened for Svalbard at the Key Club in Leeds. In November and December, they supported SKYND on their four-date UK tour. On 27 November 2023, Zetra announced that they had signed to Nuclear Blast Records and released a new single, "Sacrifice". The duo said that "It is not lost on us that we have found ourselves realising our debut album for such a prestigious record label, but it has always felt like Zetra was meant share a home with Dimmu Borgir and In Flames." On 31 December 2023, Zetra joined Ville Valo, former frontman of HIM, at the Helldone Festival in Finland. Valo had previously expressed admiration for Zetra in interviews, being a fan of their cover of Mummy Calls' "Beauty Has Her Way" in particular.

On 20 February 2024, Zetra released a cover of The Cure's "Burn", to mark the 30th anniversary of 1994 film The Crow. In March 2024, they supported Creeper and Naut on the former's 12 Days of Night tour in the UK. On 3 April 2024, the band announced that their self-titled debut album would be released on 13 September 2024 and released another single, "Starfall", featuring Serena Cherry of Svalbard and Noctule. The duo said the album is centred around observing the human experience through the eyes of the Spirit of Zetra. The album will feature guest appearances from Solveig Mathildur (of Kaelan Mikla) and Gabriel Franco (of Unto Others). From 4 April to 10 May 2024, Zetra supported Ville Valo on his European tour in support of his solo debut Neon Noir (2023). Zetra performed at the 2000trees festival in July 2024, and at ArcTanGent in August. In October 2024, the band and GosT supported Health for the European leg of their Rat Wars tour. The band toured the United Kingdom in January and February 2025.

== Style and influences ==
Zetra have categorised their sound as "gothic heavy metal shoegaze", with influences of synth-pop, new wave and synth-rock. Metal Hammer described their sound as "an icy, enveloping mix of 80s-inspired synth-pop, goth-metal heaviness and atmospheric dream-pop, capped with hazy vocals of indeterminate gender(s)." Zetra have cited Black Sabbath, Cocteau Twins, Mortiis, My Bloody Valentine, Gary Numan, Paradise Lost, Radiohead, the Smashing Pumpkins, Tangerine Dream, Deadsy, Type O Negative and ZZ Top as influences on their sound. The band listed Coldplay as the biggest influence on their debut album. Journalists have also compared the band to The Cure, Depeche Mode, Deftones, Ghost, the Pet Shop Boys and Tiamat.

The Spirit of Zetra has been described by the band as both a muse and a "prism" through which their songwriting is reflected. This source of inspiration is also cited as the origin of their decision to wear corpse paint on stage and heavily feature the imagery of chains live and in music videos. Zetra's early EPs are each centered around specific storylines and narratives, such as their Zetra EP, which is based on Vladimir Komarov's failed space mission, and With Your Demons Volume Two partially revolving around the overturn of societies and the audiences thereof. The From Within and From Without EPs both focus on a "the plague; a non-historical and a historical one", and "fear and leaving your loved ones." The band's debut album has less of a specific concept; its tracks present the Spirit of Zetra as an outsider to earth and an observer of the human experience.

== Awards and nominations ==
Heavy Music Awards
Year	Nominee / work	Award	Result	Ref.
2024	Themselves	Best UK Breakthrough Artist	Nominated	

== Discography ==
=== Studio albums ===
Title	Details
Zetra	Released: 13 September 2024; Label: Nuclear Blast; Format: CD, LP, DD

=== Remix albums ===
Title	Details
Zetra: The Floor Eternal (with theKeymaker)	Released: 25 September 2025; Label: Nuclear Blast; Format: CS, DD

=== EPs ===
Title	Details
Zetra	Released: 24 July 2020; Label: Death Waltz; Format: CS, DD
The Wanderer	Released: 17 December 2020; Label: Self-released; Format: CS, DD
From Within	Released: 3 September 2021; Label: Children of the Vortex/Blood Blast Distribution; Format: CS, DD
From Without	Released: 21 January 2022; Label: Church Road; Format: CS, DD
Sacred Songs	Released: 21 December 2022; Label: Children of the Vortex; Format: CD, CS, DD
Believe	Released: 22 August 2025; Label: Nuclear Blast; Format: DD

=== Demo albums ===
Title	Details
Demo One	Released: 14 February 2019; Label: Self-released; Format: CS, DD
Chambers (Rehearsal Recordings 31/10/19)	Released: 31 October 2019; Label: Children of the Vortex; Format: CS, DD
With Your Demons Vol. One	Released: 1 May 2020; Label: Self-released; Format: CS, DD
With Your Demons Vol. Two	Released: 15 May 2020; Label: Self-released; Format: CS, DD

=== Singles ===
Title	Year	Album
"Mr. Tambourine Man"	2020	Zetra (EP)
"Cry Little Sister" / "Beauty Has Her Way"	2020	Non-album single
"Life Melts Away"	2021	From Within
"Care"	2021	From Within
"Pull Me Under"	2021	From Within
"The Raven's Game"	2021	From Without
"Call of the Void"	2021	From Without
"Into My Flesh"	2022	Sacred Songs
"Float"	2022	Sacred Songs
"Satellite"	2022	Sacred Songs
"Hopeless Odyssey"	2022	Sacred Songs
"Sacred Song" / "Starlit Comet"	2022	Sacred Songs
"Sacrifice"	2023	Zetra
"Burn"	2024	Non-album single
"Starfall" (featuring Serena Cherry)	2024	Zetra
"The Mirror"	2024	Zetra
"Shatter the Mountain" (featuring Sólveig Matthildur)	2024	Zetra
"Suffer Eternally"	2024	Zetra
"So"	2025	Believe
"The Spider"	2025	Believe
