= Space Age Playboys =

US musical group

Space Age Playboys was an American band formed by Johnny Jetson and former Warrior Soul lead singer Kory Clarke, named after that band's final album before their 1995 break up. Based in Los Angeles, the band was active from 1997 to 2000, releasing one studio and one live album, touring Europe twice and the US once. Following from the name given Warrior Soul's style since their album Chill Pill, the band was referred to as an "acid punk" band, but critics also noted a shift in lyrical focus from Clarke's earlier, darker, more political work to a focus on party anthems and drugs.

== Members ==
- Kory Clarke – vocals
- Johnny Jetson – guitar
- Stevie Deluxe – drums
- Riley Baxter – bass

== Discography ==
- New Rock Underground (1999)
- Live in London (1999)
