= Raging Slab =

American rock band

- Origin: New York City, U.S.
- Genres: Southern rock, hard rock, boogie rock
- Years active: 1983–present
- Labels: Buy Our Records, RCA, American, Tee Pee
- Members: Greg Strzempka; Niklas Matsson; Mats Rydström
- Past members: Elyse Steinman; Kory Clarke; Dmitri Brill; Robert Pauls; Alec Morton; Tony Scaglione; Phil Ondich; Bob Pantella; Rob Cournoyer; Jack Irons; Paul Sheehan; Mark Middleton; Scott Nesmith
- Website: ragingslab.com

Raging Slab is an American rock band that plays a blend of southern rock and boogie with influences from metal and punk. They released six albums between 1987 and 2002.

== History ==
The group formed in 1983 when Greg Strzempka and Elyse Steinman, both guitarists, met in New York City. The two had a shared interest in the heavy rock sounds of 1970s style boogie rock and such contemporary punk rock groups as the Ramones and Black Flag. The couple enlisted the services of drummer Kory Clarke (Warrior Soul and Space Age Playboys), bassist Robert Pauls (formerly of Warrior Soul), as well as a third guitarist, Dmitri Brill (later known as Super DJ Dmitri of Deee-Lite), and the group began playing their first shows in Manhattan's Lower East Side rock clubs.

By 1986, the group had gone through several personnel changes, and both Clarke and Brill had departed, but the line-up solidified somewhat with the addition of Alec Morton on bass guitar. The group began to build a steady and loyal following around the New York City and New Jersey area, playing many shows with the Butthole Surfers and also with Strzempka and Steinman's then next-door neighbours, White Zombie. Ultimately the band would utilize the talents of over twenty different drummers, including former Whiplash and Slayer drummer Tony Scaglione, Black Label Society co-founder Phil Ondich, Monster Magnet/Riotgod drummer Bob Pantella, and New Orleans native Rob Cournoyer, before finding Backdraft drummer Niklas Matsson to fill out the line up.

In 1987, the group recorded their first album, Assmaster, released on the New Jersey–based punk label Buy Our Records. The cover art was executed by Marvel Comics artists Pat Redding and Pete Ciccone, and Raging Slab began to tour across the United States. In 1988, Steinman and Strzempka decide to add a third guitarist, Mark Middleton, and the group released their second album, True Death (1988).

By 1989, several major labels were bidding to sign Raging Slab, and ultimately it was RCA Records that attracted the band to sign a multi-record contract. The group recorded their eponymous third album Raging Slab, produced by Daniel Rey. To help support this album the group also produced a video, and the clip for their song "Don't Dog Me" featured the band being dragged around the Mojave Desert by a monster truck. The video climbed to No. 2 on the MTV countdown.

A 1989 Guitar World review of Raging Slab described the group's sound as "Lynyrd Skynyrd meets Metallica". By this time the group was touring extensively, opening for big-name acts such as the Red Hot Chili Peppers, the Ramones, Molly Hatchet and Warrant. One of the bands that had opened for Raging Slab on their 1990 tour was a then little-known group called Mr. Crowe's Garden, who were soon to become the Black Crowes. It was during this time that Strzempka and Steinman purchased a rural property in Pennsylvania and built "Slabby Road", the group's personal recording studio. The members of the group lived together on the farm in a type of "communal" relationship and began recording their second RCA record, From a Southern Space, produced by Alex Perialis. Executives at RCA were not pleased with the direction that the group was going with this recording and decide to withdraw their support for its release. During this time the group also opened for Guns N' Roses on their "Top Secret Club Tour".

The band reentered the studio to record their third RCA record Freeburden with producer Michael Beinhorn, and the group were utilizing the talents of Chili Pepper and Pearl Jam drummer, Jack Irons. Once again their work is rejected by RCA. Def American impresario Rick Rubin began to make offers to the group to leave RCA and make records for his flourishing label. The group agreed and Rubin bought out the remainder of their contract with RCA.

In 1992, the group began to record a new album with producer Brendan O'Brien as well as former Led Zeppelin member John Paul Jones who had agreed to work with the band, contributing string arrangements.

In 1993, the band released their Def American debut, the double album Dynamite Monster Boogie Concert. A video that the group creates to accompany this release, "Anywhere But Here", featured former child actor Gary Coleman, and the video debuted on MTV's popular Beavis and Butt-Head program, where Beavis is heard to declare, "they're like Skynyrd, but cool…".

The following year the band embarked on a European tour in support of Texas. They also played with Lenny Kravitz and Monster Magnet, but while in England the group's drummer Paul Sheehan suffered debilitating knee injuries and the group curtailed its tour. They returned to the U.S. and began recording their second Def American (by now known as American Recordings) album. The group delivered Black Belt in Boogie, but the record was rejected by Rubin, who reportedly told the group that he "didn't hear any songs" on it, and currently has not been released. It was during this time that lead guitarist Mark Middleton chose to leave the band, citing "personal problems" as the reason for his departure. Middleton went on to reform the Desperadoes, a classic rock cover band.

The group then returned to the studio to record its next album Sing Monkey, Sing!, which was released with little publicity. American Recordings then severed its relationship with its distributor Warner Bros. Records, but neglected to tell the members of Raging Slab that it had done so, and also overlooked the legalities of releasing the group from its contract. Sing Monkey, Sing! is then sold to the Columbia Record Club, and the band began legal proceedings against their former label. Deciding that formal proceedings against such a powerful adversary would result only in their own financial ruin, the group decided to wait out the remainder of their contract, which effectively barred them from releasing any new music until the year 2000.

In 1997, however, the group began gigging and recording for their next release, utilizing the talents of drummer Phil Ondich who subsequently left the band in May 1998 to form Zakk Wylde's Black Label Society. The group was able to lure Dale Crover (The Melvins, Nirvana) to help them with drum duties until a permanent replacement could be found. Crover also played some live shows with Raging Slab, including some opening spots for guitarist Leslie West. Rob Cournoyer joined after being referred to the band by Allman Brothers and Government Mule guitarist Warren Haynes.

With the passing of the year 2000, the group's contractual restrictions finally fell away and they began to again record and release music, and they appear on compilation albums such as the Aerosmith tribute album Right in the Nuts, as well as a supplying a cover version of "Mississippi Queen" that appears on the In The Groove compilation album.

In 2001 the group returned with a renewed vigor and they released The Dealer on The New York–based independent label Tee Pee Records, and this was the first album of new and original music released by the band in almost six years. The group toured the U.S. and Canada extensively at this time, and were preparing to embark on a European tour. Scheduled to depart New York City bound for London, England on September 11, 2001, the infamous atrocity that occurred on that date postponed the European leg of their tour until later in 2001. On their return to the US the group once again headed into their studio to begin a new record. This album entitled Pronounced: Eat Shit was released in 2002, also on Tee Pee Records.

After the release and European tour for Pronounced: Eat Shit, the band took a long hiatus, before announcing that longtime bassist Alec Morton was suffering from congestive heart failure. Slab frontman Greg Strzempka joined Swedish southern-metallers Backdraft in 2003, before changing the band name to Odin Grange. But in the year 2004, drummer Niklas Matsson and bassist Mats Rydström joined Raging Slab for a short tour of the US and the recording of a new record, which was not released.

In March 2017, founding member and frontman Greg Strzempka announced the death of guitarist Elyse Steinman on the band's Facebook page. The musician lost a three-year battle with cancer on March 30.

== Members ==
Current

- Greg Strzempka – guitar, vocals (since 1983)
- Niklas Matsson – drums (since 2004)
- Mats Rydström – bass guitar (since 2004)

Former

- Elyse Steinman – slide guitar, vocals (1983–2017) (deceased)
- Kory Clarke – drums (1983–1986)
- Robert Pauls – bass guitar (1983–1986)
- Dmitri Brill – guitar (1983–1986)
- Alec Morton – bass guitar (1986–2004)
- Mark Middleton – Lead guitar (1986–1995)
- Tony Scaglione – drums (1989)
- Phil Ondich – drums (1997–1998)
- Bob Pantella – drums (1989-1991)
- Rob Cournoyer – drums (1998–2004)
- Jack Irons – drums (1992)
- Paul Sheehan – drums (1992–1997)

Substitute musicians

- Dale Crover – drums (1998)
- Tim Finefrock – drums (1986–1989)

== Discography ==
=== Studio albums ===
- Assmaster CD/LP (1987 Buy Our Records)
- Raging Slab CD/LP (1989 RCA Records)
- From a Southern Space (1991 unreleased)
- Freeburden (1992 unreleased)
- Dynamite Monster Boogie Concert CD (1993 Def American)
- Black Belt in Boogie (1995 unreleased)
- Sing Monkey, Sing! CD (1996 American Recordings)
- The Dealer CD/LP (2001 Tee Pee Records)
- (pronounced ēat-shït) CD (2002 Tee Pee Records)
- Sisterslab and the Boogie Coalition, Vol. 1 CD (2020 Joyful Noise Recordings)

=== Singles ===
- "Mr. Lucky" (1988 Buy Our Records)
- True Death EP CD/12" (1989 Buy Our Records)
- "Bent for Silver" CD (1989 RCA Records)
- "Don't Dog Me" CD (1989 RCA Records)
- A Taste o' Slab CD (1993 American Recordings)
- "Anywhere But Here" CD (1993 American Recordings)
- "Pearly" CD (1993 American Recordings)
- "What Have You Done" CD (1993 American Recordings)
- "Take a Hold" CD/12" (1994 American Recordings)
- "Should'A Known" CD (1994 American Recordings)

=== Reissue ===
- Slabbage/True Death CD (1991 Restless Records) (combo of Assmaster and True Death EP)
- Raging Slab + 2 CD (2000 Axe Killer Records)
- Raging Slab CD (2009 Rock Candy Records)
- Assmaster CD (2013 Cherry Red Records) (includes original Assmaster album, True Death EP, bonus tracks from Slabbage/True Death, and other remixes and previously unreleased bonus material)

=== Compilation tracks ===
- "Feel Too Much" on Bands That Ate New York LP (1986 Natural Enemies Records)
- "Alpha Jerk" on A Restless World CD (1991 Restless Records)
- "Anywhere but Here" on Details Music Matters Special Edition 5 CD (1994 Details)
- "Pot Head Pixies" on Hempilation: Freedom Is NORML CD (1995 Capricorn Records)
- "Take a Hold" on American Product CD sampler (1998 American Recordings)
- "Mississippi Queen" on In The Groove CD (1999 The Music Cartel)
- "Lynne" on Jump Into Rock CD (1999 Mercury Records)
- "Bone to Bone" on Right in the Nuts: A Tribute to Aerosmith CD (2000, Small Stone Records)
- "Pole Cat Woman" on Judge Not CD (2000 Underdogma Records)
- "We're an American Band" on Sucking the 70's 2CD (2002 Small Stone Records)
- "Miss Delicious" on Guerrilla Jukebox Vol 1 (2003 CD Tee Pee Records)
