= Little America =

Little America may refer to:

== Arts and entertainment ==
- Little America (band), a group with Geffen Records
- Little America (film), a 1935 Paramount Pictures film
- Little America (TV series), an American anthology television series on Apple TV+
- Little America (video), a live concert DVD by Alphaville
- Little Amerricka, an amusement park in Marshall, Wisconsin, United States
- "Little America", a song by R.E.M. from their 1984 album Reckoning

== Hotels and resorts ==
- Grand America Hotels & Resorts (formerly Little America)
  - Little America Hotel (Salt Lake City), in Utah, United States
  - Little America Hotel & Resort Cheyenne, in Wyoming, United States
  - Little America Wyoming, near Green River, Wyoming, United States

== Places ==
- Little America (exploration base), an Antarctic exploration base
- Little America, Illinois, an unincorporated community in Fulton County, Illinois, United States
- Little America, Wyoming, a census-designated place in Sweetwater County, Wyoming, United States
- "Little America", a nickname for Helmand Province

== See also ==
- Little American
- America's Little House, former demonstration house in Manhattan
