= Let It Go (Galactic Cowboys album) =

Studio album by Galactic Cowboys
- Released: June 20, 2000
- Genres: Heavy metal, hard rock, progressive rock
- Length: 73:50
- Label: Metal Blade
- Producer: Wally Farkas

Galactic Cowboys chronology
At the End of the Day (1998)	Let It Go (2000)	Long Way Back to the Moon (2017)

Professional ratings
Review scores
Source	Rating
The Phantom Tollbooth	(not rated)
HM	(not rated)
Allmusic	1.5/5 stars
Collector's Guide to Heavy Metal	9/10

Let It Go is the sixth studio album from heavy metal band Galactic Cowboys. It was released on June 20, 2000.

== Notes ==
- Several of the songs on this album were originally written by Monty Colvin for a solo project, but were used instead on this album, since they were appropriate for the Galactic Cowboys style.
- The boy on the cover of this album is the son of Donovan White, who played guitar on the Crunchy album All Day Sucker.
- The album has lead vocal contributions from all members: Ben Huggins, Wally Farkas and Monty Colvin.
- Former drummer Alan Doss mixed the album, and contributed some backing vocals.
- King's X drummer Jerry Gaskill played most of the drums on the album. Wally also did drums on some tracks.
- The album has a rather strange intro proclaiming the band to have "a new sound for a new millennium" - hip hop. This leads us into a false sense of insecurity, before the opening riff of "T.I.M." plays.
- The final track "The Record Ends" is the longest track on any Galactic Cowboys album. However, most of the latter part of the track is a cacophonous collage of sounds and samples.

== Track listing ==
No.	Title	Writer(s)	Length
1.	"Intro"		1:13
2.	"T.I.M."	Colvin	3:34
3.	"A Different Way"	Colvin	3:32
4.	"Life And Times"	Farkas	4:33
5.	"Flag"	Farkas, Huggins	3:15
6.	"Disney's Spinnin'"	Colvin	4:35
7.	"Hey Mr."	Huggins, Farkas, Gaskill	5:51
8.	"Another Hill"	Colvin	4:49
9.	"Dirty Hands"	Farkas, Huggins	3:31
10.	"Boom!"	Farkas, Huggins, Gaskill	1:20
11.	"Ordinary"	Huggins	2:52
12.	"Internalize"	Colvin	2:43
13.	"Swimming In December"	Colvin	10:28
14.	"Song For Sybo"	Farkas	2:51
15.	"Future"	Huggins	3:31
16.	"Bucket Of Chicken"	Farkas, Gaskill, Huggins, Colvin	2:42
17.	"The Record Ends"	Colvin	12:34

== Personnel ==
- Ben Huggins – vocals, guitar
- Wally Farkas – vocals, guitar, drums, keyboards, organ
- Monty Colvin – vocals, bass
- Jerry Gaskill – drums, vocals

=== Guest musicians ===
- Alan Doss – engineer, mixing, tone generator, vocal harmony
- Max Dyer – cello
- Shane Huggins
- Ty Tabor – tone generator
- Tamra Perkinson – background vocals (track 11)
- Nano Jones – drum machine (track 12)
- Robert Rich – soundscapes
- The Little LaLa People
