= Machine Fish =

Studio album by Galactic Cowboys
- Released: January 30, 1996
- Recorded: 69:08
- Genre: Heavy metal
- Label: Metal Blade
- Producer: Alan Doss

Galactic Cowboys chronology
Space In Your Face (1993)	Machine Fish (1996)	Feel The Rage (EP) (1996)

Professional ratings
Review scores
Source	Rating
AllMusic	4/5 stars
Collector's Guide to Heavy Metal	9/10
Cornerstone	(not rated)
Cross Rhythms	10/10 medals
Kerrang!	4/5 stars

Machine Fish is the third studio album from heavy metal band Galactic Cowboys and their first for Metal Blade Records. The album is heavier, more straightforward, and less progressive than their previous release. Cornerstone praised Ben Huggins' vocals, stating that his voice "scrapes across your ears with an intensity usually reserved for those being eaten alive by great white sharks."

== Notes ==
- The artwork depicts a "machine fish", which is actually a garbage sculpture made by bassist Monty Colvin, complete with turning indicator light bulbs for eyes.
- The song "Red Sun" actually dates back to 1989. Versions of the song were recorded for the self-titled album and Space In Your Face, but a re-worked version of the song made the cut for Machine Fish.
- The Japanese version of this album contained the bonus track "It's Raining (Again)".

== Track listing ==
No.	Title	Writer(s)	Length
1.	"Feel The Rage"	Colvin, Huggins	3:14
2.	"The Struggle"	Colvin	5:54
3.	"Fear Not"	Colvin	5:03
4.	"Stress"	Colvin	4:35
5.	"Psychotic Companion"	Colvin	7:32
6.	"In This Life"	Colvin, Huggins	3:14
7.	"Easy To Love"	Colvin	4:09
8.	"Red Sun"	Colvin, Huggins, Doss	4:59
9.	"Idle Minds"	Huggins, Colvin, Doss	4:11
10.	"The Lens"	Doss, Huggins, Colvin	5:25
11.	"Pattin' Yourself On The Back"	Colvin	3:45
12.	"In A Lonely Room"	Colvin	4:45
13.	"9th Of June"	Colvin	5:24
14.	"Arrow"	Huggins, Doss	6:58

== Personnel ==
- Ben Huggins - Vocals, guitar
- Wally Farkas - Guitar, vocals, keys
- Monty Colvin - Bass, vocals
- Alan Doss - Drums, vocals, keys
