= Raging Slab (album) =

Studio album by Raging Slab
- Released: 1989
- Recorded: 1989
- Studios: Record Plant, New York City
- Genre: Hard rock
- Length: 37:39
- Label: RCA
- Producer: Daniel Rey

Raging Slab chronology
Raging Slab (1989)	Dynamite Monster Boogie Concert (1993)

Raging Slab is the major label debut of American hard rock band Raging Slab, released in 1989. The album contains the singles "Don't Dog Me" and "Bent For Silver". "Don't Dog Me" was a minor hit on radio and MTV.

The album peaked at No. 113 on the Billboard 200.

== Critical reception ==
Professional ratings
Review scores
Source	Rating
AllMusic	3/5 stars
The Encyclopedia of Popular Music	3/5 stars

Trouser Press praised the "much better songwriting" and "muscular production." The Encyclopedia of Popular Music deemed the album "excellent." The Chicago Tribune wrote that "[Greg] Strzempka`s gutsy voice and the band`s ferocious bar-room intensity are enough to give any rock fan a thrill." The Morning Call likened the band to "Black Oak Arkansas raised to the 10th power."

== Track listing ==
All songs written by Greg Strzempka.

No.	Title	Length
1.	"Don't Dog Me"	3:51
2.	"Joy Ride"	3:43
3.	"Sorry's All I Got"	2:59
4.	"Waiting for the Potion"	2:46
5.	"Gett Off My Jollies"	3:51
6.	"Shiny Mama"	3:21
7.	"Geronimo"	4:55
8.	"Bent for Silver"	3:01
9.	"Love Comes Loose"	3:06
10.	"Dig a Hole"	3:07
11.	"San Loco"	2:59

== Personnel ==
- Greg Strzempka – vocals, guitar
- Elyse Steinman – bottleneck guitar
- Alec Morton – bass guitar
- Mark Middleton – lead guitar
- Bob Pantella – drums (credited but does not play on album)

Additional personnel

- Tony Scaglione – drums on all tracks except "Get Off My Jollies"
- Steve "Doc Killdrums" Wacholz – drums on "Get Off My Jollies"
- Ray Gillen – backing vocals on "Shiny Mama"
- Paul Presttopino – dobro solo on "Sorry's All I Got"
- Norm Chynoweth – piano on "Dig a Hole"

Credits

- Produced by Daniel Rey
- Mixed by Gary Lyons for So Good Productions
- Mastered by George Marino at Sterling Sound, NYC
