= Space in Your Face =

Space In Your Face

Studio album by Galactic Cowboys
- Released: June 8, 1993
- Studios: Rivendell Recorders, Houston, TX
- Genres: Heavy metal; progressive metal
- Length: 73:46
- Label: DGC
- Producer: Sam Taylor

Galactic Cowboys chronology
Galactic Cowboys (1991)	Space In Your Face (1993)	Machine Fish (1996)

Professional ratings
Review scores
Source	Rating
AllMusic	2.5/5 stars
Collector's Guide to Heavy Metal	10/10
Cross Rhythms	6/10 medals
Kerrang!	3/5 stars
Metal Hammer	3/5

Space In Your Face is the second studio album from heavy metal band Galactic Cowboys. It is the band's final album for DGC Records, who pulled the band's touring support shortly after the album's release.

== Trivia ==
- The man on the cover of "Space In Your Face" is David Kitchens, former ranch hand for singer Ben Huggins’ brother-in-law, as he was the only person they could find who fit in the suit.
- During the song "Where Are You Now?", you can hear a scripted phone conversation between bassist Monty Colvin, his wife (at the time) and singer Ben Huggins' wife.
- There are two hidden tracks on this album; "Ranch on Mars" and "Still Life of Peace". These two tracks were hidden so the band could include two more tracks than Geffen wanted.
- Ben Huggins regards Space In Your Face, along with At the End of the Day, as the band's high point.
- Dream Theater cited the album as an influence on their sixth album Six Degrees of Inner Turbulence (2002).
- The album has sold 31,061 copies as of January 2000, according to Nielsen Soundscan.

== Track listing ==
No.	Title	Writer(s)	Length
1.	"Space In Your Face"	Doss	1:39
2.	"You Make Me Smile"	Colvin	4:22
3.	"I Do What I Do"	Colvin	5:22
4.	"Circles in the Fields"	Colvin	4:47
5.	"If I Were a Killer"	Doss, Huggins	3:57
6.	"Blind"	Colvin, Huggins	7:32
7.	"No Problems"	Doss, Huggins, Colvin	7:23
8.	"About Mrs. Leslie"	Doss, Huggins	5:12
9.	"Where Are You Now"	Colvin	7:48
20.	"Ranch on Mars" (hidden track; starts after 2:31 of silence)	Colvin	7:36
32.	"Still Life of Peace" (hidden track)	Colvin, Huggins	6:56

== Personnel ==
- Ben Huggins - vocals, acoustic guitar, blues harp
- Dane Sonnier - guitar, vocals
- Monty Colvin - bass, vocals
- Alan Doss - drums, vocals
- Andy Wallace - mixing

=== Guest musicians ===
- Max Dyer - cello
- Fletch Wiley - trumpet
