= Dynamite Monster Boogie Concert =

Studio album by Raging Slab
- Released: April 27, 1993
- Genre: Southern rock
- Length: 46:59
- Label: Def American
- Producer: Brendan O'Brien

Raging Slab chronology
| Raging Slab (1989) | Dynamite Monster Boogie Concert (1993) | Sing Monkey Sing (1996) |

Dynamite Monster Boogie Concert is a studio album by American hard rock band Raging Slab, released in 1993 on CD and cassette, and digitally in 2009. It was named after the third in a trilogy of "Chopper Cop" pulp fiction novels by Paul Ross; and the video for its first single, "Anywhere But Here", included a cameo by actor Gary Coleman.

== Production ==
The album was recorded on a Pennsylvania farm, in a studio constructed by the band. It was produced by Brendan O'Brien; the track "Lynne" features strings provided by Led Zeppelin's John Paul Jones.

Raging Slab had recorded three full albums between its 1989 debut and Dynamite Monster Boogie Concert, but due to record label issues did not release any of them.

== Reception ==
Professional ratings
Review scores
| Source | Rating |
|---|---|
| AllMusic | 4/5 stars |
| The Encyclopedia of Popular Music | 4/5 stars |
| Entertainment Weekly | B |
| Rock Hard | 9/10 |

In 2005, Dynamite Monster Boogie Concert was ranked number 395 in Rock Hard magazine's book The 500 Greatest Rock & Metal Albums of All Time. The Chicago Reader called the album "rife with fragments of the 70s: Lynyrd Skynyrd's southern blues boogie, Blue Oyster Cult's heavy rock hooks, Grand Funk Railroad's braggadocio, ZZ Top's riff-drenched electric blues, Bad Company's pure hard rock." Entertainment Weekly wrote that "the absurdly rocking, two-guitars-plus-slide Slab combines about 85 genres into one stinking heap of divine something-or-other."

The Washington Post wrote that "the Slab is a retro-boogie band, enlivened by [Greg] Strzempka's skill with melody and arrangement but utterly predictable in style." Spin praised the album's devotion to funk, writing that "the band harks back to an age when heavy rock had more in common with black proto-funk such as the Meters than with the rhythmic regimentation of today's metal."

== Track listing ==
All songs written by Greg Strzempka.

| No. | Title | Length |
|---|---|---|
| 1. | "Anywhere But Here" | 3:56 |
| 2. | "Weatherman" | 3:12 |
| 3. | "Pearly" | 3:36 |
| 4. | "So Help Me" | 4:13 |
| 5. | "What Have You Done" | 4:05 |
| 6. | "Take a Hold" | 5:02 |
| 7. | "Laughin' and Cryin'" | 3:19 |
| 8. | "Don't Worry About the Bomb" | 2:33 |
| 9. | "Lynne" | 4:32 |
| 10. | "Lord Have Mercy" | 3:52 |
| 11. | "National Dust" | 3:34 |
| 12. | "Ain't Ugly None" | 5:05 |

== Personnel ==
- Greg Strzempka - vocals, guitar, slide, banjo, mandolin
- Elyse Steinman - slide guitar, vocals, lap steel
- Alec Morton - four stringed electric bass
- Mark Middleton - lead guitar, slide, vocals
- Paul Sheehan - drums, cymbals

Additional personnel

- Danny Frankel - smaller drums
- John Paul Jones - strings on "Lynne"

Credits

- Produced and mixed by Brendan O'Brien
- Engineered by Nick DiDia
- Mix Assistant by Danny Alonso
- Recorded at Big Mo Recording while it was parked at the Slab Farm
- Executive Producer: Rick Rubin
- Album Art by Raging Slab
- Band photos by Allison Dyer
- Other photos by the Electric Mystress
