= Blonz =

- Origin: Atlanta, Georgia
- Genres: Glam metal
- Years active: 1986–1990
- Labels: Epic, Imagine Entertainment
- Past members: Nathan Utz (vocals); Steve Taylor (guitars); Dennis Ogle (guitars, keyboards); Michael Fandino (bass); Aaron Tate (drums, percussion); Tony Langham (Bass); Mike Anderson (Drums)
- Website: Blonz Myspace page

Blonz was a glam metal band from Atlanta, GA that formed in 1986. They were signed by Lenny Petze (Cheap Trick/Boston) in the wake of glam metal's explosive popularity, recorded one album for Epic Records, and then disappeared. The album was recorded at Southern Tracks studio in Atlanta, produced by Steve Walsh and Phil Ehart of the band Kansas, and engineered by Brendan O'Brien.

== Members ==
- Nathan Utz - vocals
- Steve Taylor - guitars
- Dennis Ogle - guitars, keyboards
- Michael Fandino - bass
- Aaron Tate - drums, percussion
- Jimmy Jimmy - backing vocals
- Tony Langham - Original Bassist
- Mike Anderson - Original Drummer

== Background and name ==
According to a 1990 interview with Hit Parader, vocalist Nathan Utz "was sitting around trying to come up with a name that would really represent us. In the middle of the night it hit me; I started running through the halls yelling at the guys that we've got to call ourselves The Dirty Blonds. We first went under that name until we shortened it to Blonz." Utz claimed it to be a fluke that "we all have blond hair; even when we got Aaron & Michael in the band, they had blond hair. I think somebody was trying to tell us something."

== Discography ==
- Blonz (1990)

== See also ==
- List of glam metal bands and artists
