= Feel the Rage =

EP by Galactic Cowboys
- Released: October 8, 1996
- Genre: Heavy metal
- Length: 31:37
- Label: Metal Blade
- Producer: Alan Doss

Galactic Cowboys chronology
Machine Fish (1996)	Feel the Rage (1996)	The Horse That Bud Bought (1997)

Professional ratings
Review scores
Source	Rating
AllMusic	2.5/5 stars
Collector's Guide to Heavy Metal	8/10
Cross Rhythms	4/10 medals

Feel the Rage is an EP released by heavy metal band Galactic Cowboys.

== Notes ==
- The artwork is a painting by bassist Monty Colvin.
- A new song "Paradigm Shift" is the second track on this EP, while the title track originally appeared on the Machine Fish album.
- This EP contains two covers; "I Want You" by Kiss, and "Junior's Farm" by Wings.
- The original versions of the two live tracks, "Idle Minds" and "9th Of June", can be found on the Machine Fish album.
- The un-listed track, dubbed "Grandmother's Closet", is a short bluegrass song written during the Machine Fish sessions.

== Track listing ==
1. "Feel The Rage" (Colvin, Huggins)
2. "Paradigm Shift" (Colvin, Huggins, Doss)
3. "I Want You" (Paul Stanley)
4. "Junior's Farm" (Paul McCartney, Linda McCartney)
5. "Idle Minds" (Live) (Huggins, Colvin, Doss)
6. "9th Of June" (Live) (Colvin)
7. "Grandmother's Closet" (Galactic Cowboys)

== Personnel ==
- Ben Huggins - Vocals, guitar
- Wally Farkas - Guitar, vocals, keys
- Monty Colvin - Bass, vocals
- Alan Doss - Drums, vocals, keys
