= Toy Subs =

American indie rock band

- Origin: Houston, Texas, United States
- Genres: Indie rock Pop rock Alternative rock
- Years active: 1988 –present
- Members: Jamie Daruwala (Guitar/vocals); Alex Tittel (guitar/vocals); Greg Mayfield (bass/vocals); Alan Doss (drums/vocals)
- Past members: Billy West (bass/vocals); John Simmons (drums); Bill Walter (bass/vocals); Darwin Keys (drums/vocals)

Toy Subs is an American indie rock band from Houston, Texas, consisting of Jamie Daruwala (r. guitar, lead vocals), Greg Mayfield (bass and vocals), Alex Tittel (guitar and vocals), and Alan Doss (drums and vocals).

== History ==
Jamie Daruwala first saw Alex Tittel playing with a fusion/rock/jazz instrumental band, Wasted Potential, while attending a keg party at Rice University in late 1987. Two songs caught Jamie's attention, and they both happened to be based on Alex's riffs. "He was everything I always wanted in a guitar player, and our guitar sounds meshed really well, so I was able to start focusing on singing and writing", said Jamie. The pair wrote their first song, "Awhile" from one of those riffs, and have been together ever since. In 1989 Jamie was graduating, and they decided to give the band a real shot. Billy West answered an ad for a bass player, and the original drummer was Jimmy Way followed soon after by Jason Wreck. They moved into and rehearsed in a Houston warehouse off of Washington Avenue where the phone number spelled out TOY-SUBS, and the band name was born.

After their very first Houston Live date at Blythe Spirits on April 1, 1990, the band was spotted by a talent scout who invited them to perform on "Star Search". The band would accept, but there would be one more change. Darwin Keys (The Judy's, Pushmonkey, Ashbury Keys) left The Judy's to join Toy Subs on drums. Toy Subs were on six shows that aired in the spring of 1991, and made it to the semi-finals. This was followed by a number of appearances on local and regional radio, and coverage from publications such as the Houston Press, including several "Best Of" Awards Live, Toy Subs played over 1500 shows throughout the 90's in Texas, surrounding states, and Japan. The band played festivals like Buzz Fest (Houston, 1995 and 1997), and opened for Bush, The Smithereens, Big Wreck, Catherine Wheel, Steve Vai and Sammy Hagar and more.

In the studio, Toy Subs consistently produced demos to shop to record labels. In 1990, they released a local cassette called "Now" based on their first demo, which also had some of the bed music they used on Star Search. Several follow-up demos recorded in 1990–92 were not released (until much later on "Toy Subs Early Years: Demos and Bootlegs”) because of a production deal they had with Steve Ames of Rampart Studios. During that time, Billy West left and was replaced by Bill Walter on bass. After parting ways with Steve, the band followed up with a pair of demos recorded with engineer/producer Alan Doss (drummer for Galactic Cowboys on label DGC at the time) called “The Red Floor Sessions” 1 and 2, the first of which was released locally on cassette in 1993.

By 1994, Darwin and Bill were followed by Greg Mayfield on Bass and Johnny Simmons on drums. They quickly recorded a four-song CD at Rivendell with Alan Doss and Ryan Birsinger called “Shed” thinking that would be the new band name for original music. But, in 1995, the band brought in Brian Garcia as Producer/Manager and essentially a fifth member. They recorded a 7-song CD called “Vim Fuego” under the name Shed only to be coaxed back to the name Toy Subs by the folks at The Buzz radio station in Houston due to the popularity of the name. Vim Fuego was repackaged with 8 songs, and produced three singles that achieved rotation status around Texas. The Buzz Houston broke “Dr. Bre”, and the singles “W.I.D.L.Y.” and “Skydive” also received airplay at stations around Texas. Toy Subs continued to tour extensively, and recorded their follow-up, “Vodka Sonic”, a ten-song CD that garnered airplay around TX as well. The singles receiving airplay were “Bad Rain”, “Apathy 101”, Take It Down”, and “Secret Sneak”, The band had small offers for publishing and record deals throughout the 90's, but turned them down in the hope of garnering a solid recording contract. It did not happen, and when the Buzz station sold to a major corporation, the airplay died with it. Toy Subs played the millennium New Year's show at Houston's Hard Rock Café, and decided to stop touring and recording. After a hiatus with separate projects and Jamie's move out of Texas, the band reunited in 2009, reissued their original recordings digitally, and began composing new material. In 2010, Jamie, Alex, Darwin, and Bill Walter had the opportunity to work in the studio with Nirvana/Foo Fighters/Green Day producer Butch Vig They recorded a new version of “Dr Bre", and by 2013, Jamie moved back to Houston and began writing and recording with Alex and Alan again. The band has been playing with the lineup of Jamie, Alex, Greg Mayfield on bass, and Alan Doss on Drums, and released a four-song EP called "The Second Scene" in late 2014.

== Previous projects ==
Current drummer Alan Doss is best known as one of the founding members of Galactic Cowboys.

== Discography ==
=== Albums ===
- Early Years: Demos And Bootlegs (1993)
- Vim Fuego (1995)
- Vodka Sonic (1998)
- The Second Scene (2014)
