= Unto Others (band) =

American gothic rock band

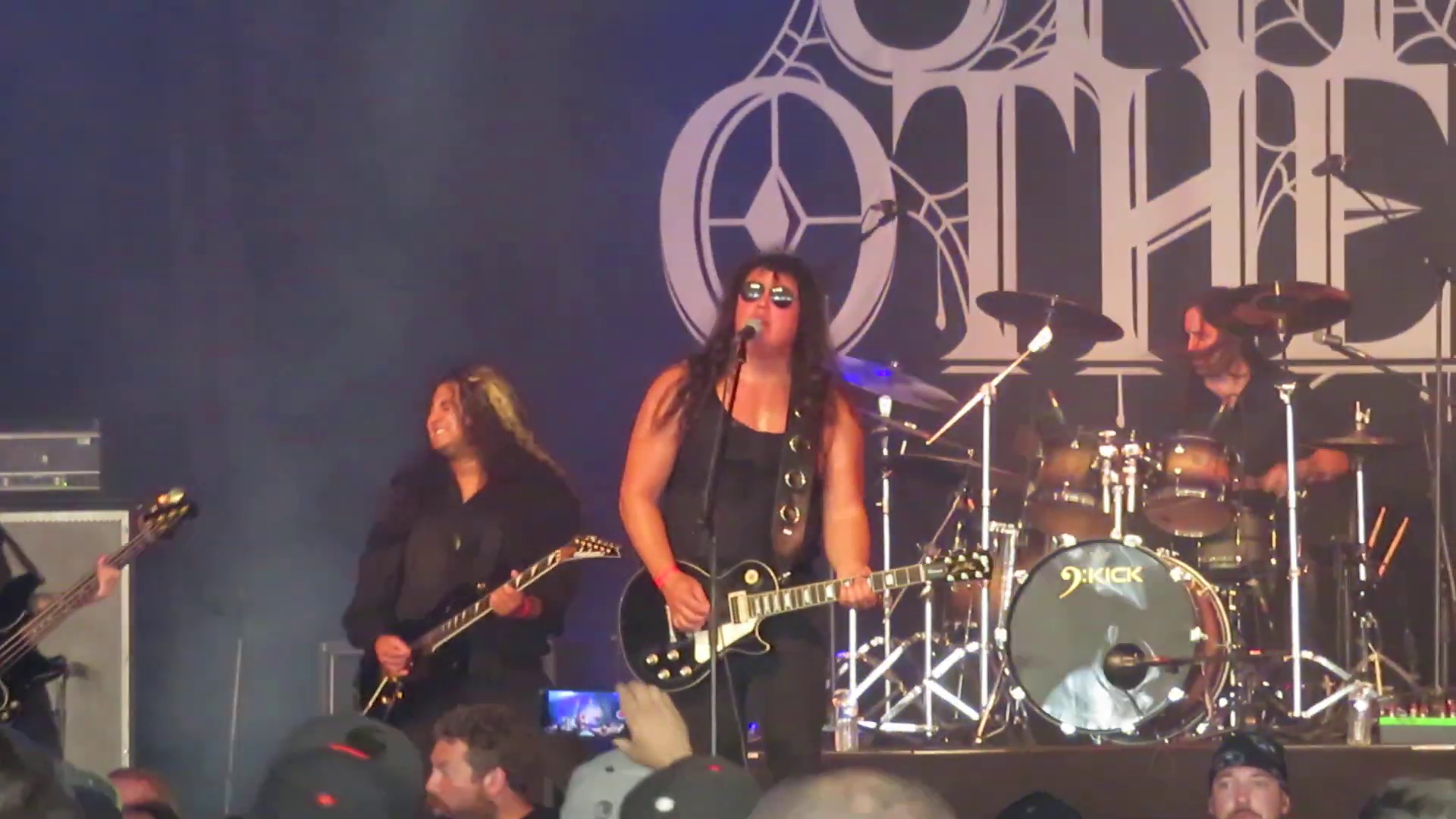
- Unto Others at Alcatraz Festival 2024

Background information
- Also known as: Idle Hands (2017–2020)
- Origin: Portland, Oregon, U.S.
- Genres: Gothic rock; heavy metal; gothic metal
- Years active: 2017–present
- Labels: Eisenwald Tonschmiede; Roadrunner; Century Media
- Members: Gabriel Franco; Sebastian Silva; Brandon Hill; Colin Vranizan
- Past members: David Kimbro
- Website: www.untoothers.net

Unto Others is an American gothic rock band from Portland, Oregon. They formed in 2017 as Idle Hands but changed their name in 2020. The band has released three studio albums so far.

== History ==
=== Idle Hands (2017–2020) ===
After the band Spellcaster broke up, its bassist Gabriel Franco formed a new band with the aim of creating something "unique". He then wrote the song "Blade and the Will" and formed the band Idle Hands with former Spellcaster guitarist Sebastian Silva. The band name comes from the phrase "idle hands are the devil's playthings". According to Franco, this means that people who have nothing to do are more prone to negative activities such as laziness or excessive alcohol consumption. Franco originally wanted to call his new band Savage Grace, but there was already a band with this name.

In June 2018, the band, joined by drummer Colin Vranizan, released the EP Don't Waste Your Time, which was produced and mixed by Gabriel Franco. Franco, by now having switched to vocals and rhythm guitar, also played bass on the EP before David Kimbro joined Idle Hands as a permanent bassist for a short time. The band was signed to German record label Eisenwald Tonschmiede and began recording their debut album at the end of November 2018. The recordings took place at Sharkbite Studios in Oakland, California. The band then toured Europe with Gaahls Wyrd and Tribulation. Idle Hands' debut album Mana, produced by Gabriel Franco and Sebastian Silva, was released on May 10, 2019. Brandon Hill joined the band as a permanent bassist the same year.

=== Unto Others (2020–present) ===
In September 2020, the band changed their name to Unto Others for legal reasons. The new name is taken from the so-called Golden Rule, which states "Do unto others as you would have them do unto you". In the case of the band, however, the name has a "little devilish twist" according to Gabiel Franco. He explained to the German Metal Hammer that mutual respect seems to exist less and less in today's society. He interprets the Golden Rule as "treat others as they would treat you".

At this time, the band was already working with producer Arthur Rizk on their second studio album Strength, which was released on September 24, 2021, via their new record label Roadrunner Records. The album contains a cover version of the song "Hell Is for Children" by Pat Benatar and entered the German album charts at number 77 and the Swiss album charts at number 99.

On October 21, 2021, Unto Others followed up with the single "I Believe in Halloween". Readers of the German Metal Hammer voted Unto Others "Aufsteiger des Jahres" ("Rising Star of the Year"). In the spring of 2022, the band played a tour of the United Kingdom and Ireland with support band Zetra. In the fall of 2022, they joined Carcass to open the co-headlining tour of bands Arch Enemy and Behemoth called The European Siege.

The band released their third studio album, Never, Neverland, on September 20, 2024, via Century Media Records. It received positive reviews, with Loudwire ranking it as the 5th best rock album of 2024. The band supported King Diamond on tour in Europe during the spring and summer of 2025, along with Paradise Lost and Angel Witch.

== Musical style ==
Wolfgang Liu Kuhn of the German magazine Rock Hard described Idle Hands' music as "a mixture of the sound of the best heavy metal band of all time (i.e. Iron Maiden) with the coolest elements of goth rock (i.e. The Sisters of Mercy)." His colleague Boris Kaiser named bands like Grave Pleasures or In Solitude as reference bands, while Moritz Grütz of Metal1.info described Idle Hands' music as post-punk and made comparisons with Killing Joke. Frank Thiessies wrote of the album Strength that "gothic metal hasn't sounded this British, eighties-inspired and heroically Spanish for a long time", the latter being a reference to Héroes del Silencio. According to Dominik Rothe of the German magazine Visions, Unto Others sounds "as if The Cure made a metal record".

Frontman Gabriel Franco describes his texts as a mixture of fact and fiction and describes himself as a storyteller. He is fascinated by extremes such as war, drug addiction, suicide and murder.

== Band members ==
- Gabriel Franco – vocals, rhythm guitar (2017–present), bass (2017–2018)
- Sebastian Silva – lead guitar (2017–present)
- Brandon Hill – bass (2019–present)
- Colin Vranizan – drums (2018–present)

Former members

- David Kimbro – bass (2018)

== Discography ==
=== Studio albums ===
- 2019: Mana (Eisenwald Tonschmiede) (as Idle Hands)
- 2021: Strength (Roadrunner Records)
- 2024: Never, Neverland (Century Media)

=== Singles/EPs ===
- 2018: Don't Waste Your Time (as Idle Hands)
- 2020: Don't Waste Your Time II (as Idle Hands)
- 2021: I Believe in Halloween
- 2023: Strength II...Deep Cuts
- 2025: I Believe in Halloween II
