= The Horse That Bud Bought =

Studio album by Galactic Cowboys
- Released: July 15, 1997
- Genre: Heavy metal
- Length: 57:03
- Label: Metal Blade
- Producers: Alan Doss and Brian Garcia

Galactic Cowboys chronology
Feel The Rage (EP) (1996)	The Horse That Bud Bought (1997)	At The End Of The Day (1998)

Professional ratings
Review scores
Source	Rating
AllMusic	3/5 stars
Collector's Guide to Heavy Metal	8/10
Cross Rhythms	10/10 medals
The Phantom Tollbooth	link

The Horse That Bud Bought is the fourth studio album from heavy metal band Galactic Cowboys. The album title comes from the lyrics to the song "Oregon". The song is derived from real life events where bassist Monty Colvin and his family (mother and father) sold all of their worldly goods and joined a cult that lived in a commune up in the mountains of Oregon. The cult leader was upset that Monty's father had bought him a horse and told him he had to give it to the whole "family".

== Notes ==
- The cover art was painted by bassist Monty Colvin.
- The song "Tilt-A-Whirl" contains a recorded sample of an actual Tilt-a-whirl carnival ride.
- The outro to the song "My Life" contains lyrics from the band's song "Still Life of Peace" sung to the tune of The Beatles' "Blue Jay Way".
- The Japanese version of this album contained the bonus track "Every Knee".
- The title to the song "The Buzz" comes from the nickname of an old rock station in Houston

== Track listing ==
No.	Title	Writer(s)	Length
1.	"Tilt-A-Whirl"	Farkas, Huggins, Doss	3:22
2.	"Evil Twin"	Colvin	3:07
3.	"Oregon"	Colvin	4:31
4.	"The Buzz (Coughing)"	Colvin, Huggins	1:26
5.	"Tomorrow"	Colvin	4:49
6.	"Ribbon"	Huggins, Colvin, Doss, Farkas	5:03
7.	"Breakthrough"	Doss, Huggins, Farkas	3:38
8.	"Bound"	Colvin, Huggins	4:36
9.	"Media Slant"	Colvin, Huggins	3:10
10.	"Mona Lisa"	Colvin	6:08
11.	"I Can't Wait"	Huggins, Colvin, Doss, Farkas	3:26
12.	"Trip On Love"	Doss, Huggins, Farkas	4:04
13.	"You've Changed"	Colvin, Huggins	3:43
14.	"My Life"	Farkas, Colvin, Huggins, Doss	6:00

== Personnel ==
- Ben Huggins – Vocals, guitar
- Wally Farkas – Guitar, vocals, keys
- Monty Colvin – Bass, vocals
- Alan Doss – Drums, vocals, keys
