= Last Decade Dead Century =

Studio album by Warrior Soul
- Released: April 17, 1990
- Genres: Rock; alternative metal
- Length: 49:34
- Label: Geffen
- Producers: Geoff Workman, Kory Clarke, Paul Church

Warrior Soul chronology
Last Decade Dead Century (1990)	Drugs, God and the New Republic (1991)

Singles from Last Decade Dead Century
- 1. "We Cry Out" Released: 1990; 2. "The Losers" Released: 1990

Last Decade Dead Century is the debut album by the band Warrior Soul, released in 1990. The album was remastered and re-released with bonus tracks on CD and MP3 by Escapi Music, in 2006, and on vinyl in 2009.

== Critical reception ==
Professional ratings
Review scores
Source	Rating
AllMusic	4.5/5 stars
Los Angeles Times	3.5/4 stars

The Los Angeles Times noted that "there's the trademarked slickness you'd expect from the Geffen guitar-rock factory... It's a sort of David Lynch version of rock 'n' roll normalcy."

== Track listing ==
1. "I See the Ruins" - 4:56
2. "We Cry Out" - 5:01
3. "The Losers" - 6:16
4. "Downtown" - 5:10
5. "Trippin' on Ecstasy" - 4:42
6. "Four More Years" - 4:36
7. "Superpower Dreamland" - 3:41
8. "Charlie's Out of Prison" - 4:50
9. "Blown Away" - 3:28
10. "Lullaby" - 4:53
11. "In Conclusion" - 6:36
12. ""Charlie's Out of Prison (live)" - 5:26 [2006 Escapi bonus track]
13. "The Losers (live)" - 9:34 [2006 Escapi bonus track]
14. "I See the Ruins (live)" - 5:42 [2006 Escapi bonus track]

== Personnel ==
- Kory Clarke – lead vocals
- John Ricco – guitar
- Pete McClanahan – bass guitar
- Paul Ferguson – drums

Production

- Mastered by George Marino at Sterling Sound, NYC
