= EZO =

Studio album by Ezo
- Released: 6 April 1987
- Studio: Record One (Los Angeles)
- Genres: Heavy metal, glam metal
- Length: 35:46
- Label: Geffen
- Producers: Gene Simmons, Val Garay

Ezo chronology
EZO (1987)	Fire Fire (1989)

Singles from EZO
- 1. "Here It Comes" Released: 21 March 1987 (Japan only); 2. "Flashback Heart Attack" Released: 21 June 1987 (Japan only); 3. "House of 1,000 Pleasures" / "Desiree" Released: 1987 (U.S.)

Professional ratings
Review scores
Source	Rating
AllMusic	4.5/5 stars
Collector's Guide to Heavy Metal	6/10
Crash	5–4/6

EZO is the American debut album of the Japanese metal band Ezo. It was released in 1987 on Geffen Records and co-produced by Gene Simmons of Kiss. Songwriters from the Kiss entourage, such as Adam Mitchell and Jaime St. James, contributed heavily to the album's songs. Jody Gray, co-writer of the song "Destroyer", co-wrote and co-produced the band's second album, Fire Fire.

== Track listing ==
Side one

1. "House of 1,000 Pleasures" (EZO, Jaime St. James) – 5:07
2. "Flashback Heart Attack" (James Christian, Susan Deicicchi) – 4:07
3. "Mr. Midnight" (Shoyo Iida, St. James) – 4:22
4. "Here It Comes" (Taro Takahashi, Adam Mitchell) – 3:14
5. "I Walk Alone" (Takahashi, Mitchell) – 3:36

Side two

6. "Destroyer" (Takahashi, Jody Gray, Mark Brotter, Mitchell) – 4:27
7. "Big Changes" (Brock Walsh) – 3:52
8. "Kiss of Fire" (EZO, Mitchell) – 3:25
9. "Desiree" (Iida, Mitchell) – 3:27

== Personnel ==
Band members

- Masaki Yamada – vocals
- Shoyo Iida – guitar
- Taro Takahashi – bass
- Hirotsugu Homma – drums

Additional musicians

- Kip Winger - background vocals

Production

- Gene Simmons - producer
- Val Garay - producer, engineer, mixing
- Richard Bosworth, Bob Levy, Cliff Jones - assistant engineers
- Stephen Marcussen - mastering

== Charts ==
Chart (1987)	Position
Billboard 200	150
