= Salutations from the Ghetto Nation =

Studio album by Warrior Soul
- Released: 1992
- Studio: Electric Lady (New York City)
- Genre: Alternative metal, hard rock
- Length: 56:20
- Label: DGC
- Producer: Kory Clarke

Warrior Soul chronology
Drugs, God and the New Republic (1991)	Salutations from the Ghetto Nation (1992)	Chill Pill (1993)

Singles from Salutations from the Ghetto Nation
- 1. "Love Destruction" Released: 1992

Salutations from the Ghetto Nation is the third album by the American heavy metal band Warrior Soul, released in 1992. The album was remastered and re-released with bonus tracks on CD, MP3 and vinyl in 2009 by Escapi Music.

== Critical reception ==
Professional ratings
Review scores
Source	Rating
AllMusic	3/5 stars
Kerrang!	4/5 stars
Rock Hard	10/10

In 2005, Salutations from the Ghetto Nation was ranked number 381 in Rock Hard's book of The 500 Greatest Rock & Metal Albums of All Time.

== Track listing ==
All songs written by Warrior Soul.

No.	Title	Length
1.	"Love Destruction"	4:46
2.	"Blown"	3:48
3.	"Shine Like It"	4:49
4.	"Dimension"	4:58
5.	"Punk and Belligerent"	3:53
6.	"Ass-Kickin"	3:38
7.	"The Party"	4:08
8.	"The Golden Shore"	6:40
9.	"Trip Rider"	4:32
10.	"I Love You"	3:27
11.	"The Fallen"	6:04
12.	"Ghetto Nation"	5:37

== Personnel ==
Credits adapted from the album's liner notes.

Warrior Soul

- Kory Clarke – vocals, producer
- John Ricco – guitar
- Pete McClanahan – bass
- Mark Evans – drums

Technical

- Bob Rosa – additional recording, mixing
- Jen Bette – assistant engineering
- Marc Glass – assistant engineering
- Hal Belknap – assistant engineering
- George Marino – mastering (Sterling Sound)

Imagery

- Reiner Design Consultants, Inc. – design
- Peter Gabriel – photography
