= Every Mother's Nightmare =

American musical group

- Also known as: EMN
- Origin: Memphis, Tennessee, United States
- Genres: Hard rock, hair metal
- Years active: 1987–present
- Labels: HighVolMusic; Arista Records; Perris Records
- Members: Rick Ruhl; Travis Butler; John Guttery; Troy Fleming; Allan Bone
- Past members: Steve Malone; Troy Bryan; Ronnie Cantrell; James Crawford; Kris 'Newt' Beavers; Craig Santicola; Jim Phipps; Shannon Harris; Mark McMurtry; Jeff Caughron; Lonnie Hammer; James Starks
- Website: www.emnrocks.com

Every Mother's Nightmare (EMN) is an American hard rock/hair metal band from Memphis, Tennessee, United States.

== Career ==
Every Mother's Nightmare formed in 1987 in Memphis and were signed by Clive Davis to Arista Records. After signing with Arista, their videos for “Walls Came Down,” “Love Can Make You Blind,” and “House of Pain” appeared on MTV's Headbangers Ball.

In the early 1990s, they opened for Cheap Trick and Dream Theater, were featured in Hard Rock magazines, and appeared on The Joan Rivers Show.

Actor Michael Shannon appears in the music video for the song "House of Pain", which was featured on the band's second album.

In 2015, they released the "Grind" EP, which included guest appearances by Zach Myers of Shinedown, and Wayne Swinny of Saliva. In 2017, the full Grind album was released, which included guest appearances by Myers and Swinny. They also released three videos to accompany the release.

In 2018, Smokin' Delta Voodoo, remastered by Anthony Focx, was reissued with bonus tracks. In 2019, Backtraxx was reissued with bonus tracks from the recording sessions. Backtraxx was remastered by Bill Chavis for HighVolMusic.

== Discography ==
=== Studio albums ===
- 1990 - Every Mother's Nightmare (Arista) Released on April 10, 1990
- 1993 - Wake Up Screaming (Arista) Released on January 12, 1993
- 2000 - Smokin' Delta Voodoo (Perris) Released on November 14, 2000
- 2001 - Back Traxx (Perris) Released on July 24, 2001
- 2002 - Deeper Shade of Grey (Perris) Released on February 12, 2002
- 2015 - Grind - EP (EMN Records) Released on June 19, 2015
- 2017 - Grind - Full Length (HighVolMusic) Released on October 6, 2017
- 2020 - Resurrect The Faithful (HighVolMusic)

=== Live albums ===
- 2002 - Live Songs from Somewhere (Perris) Released on December 3, 2002

=== Singles ===
- 1990 - "Walls Come Down" (Arista)
- 1990 - "Love Can Make You Blind" (Arista)
- 1993 - "House of Pain" (Arista)
- 2017 - "Loco Crazy" (HighVolMusic)
- 2018 - "Blown Away" (HighVolMusic)
- 2018 - "Delta Voodoo" (HighVolMusic)
- 2019 - "Southern Way" (HighVolMusic)
- 2020 - "Breathe" (HighVolMusic)

== Current members ==
- Rick Ruhl - Vocals (1987–present)
- John Guttery - Lead Guitar (2017–present)
- Troy Fleming - Bass (2000–present)
- Allan Bone - Drums (2019–present)
- Travis Butler - Lead Guitar (2012–present)

== Original members ==
- Rick Ruhl - Lead singer
- Steve Malone/James Crawford - Guitar
- Ronnie Cantrell/Mark McMurtry - Bass
- Troy Bryan/Jim Phipps - Drums

== Charts ==
Albums

- 1990 Every Mother's Nightmare, Billboard 200 No. 146
- 1993 Wake Up Screaming, Billboard Heatseekers No. 37

Singles

- 1990 "Love Can Make You Blind", Mainstream Rock Tracks No. 22
- 2017 "Loco Crazy", NACC/Metal Contraband Tracks No. 3
- 2018 "Loco Crazy", Mediabase Tracks No. 71

== See also ==
- List of glam metal bands and artists
