= Roxy Blue =

American hard rock band

- Origin: Memphis, Tennessee
- Genres: Hard rock, glam metal
- Years active: 1989-1994, 2017-present
- Labels: Geffen, Frontiers
- Members: Todd Poole; Josh Weil; Jeff Caughron
- Past members: Sid Fletcher; Wayne Swinny; Scott Trammell

Roxy Blue is an American hard rock band from Memphis, Tennessee. The band released their debut album Want Some? on Geffen Records in 1992 but disbanded shortly afterwards. The band later reformed and released a self-titled album on Frontiers Records in 2019.

== History ==
Roxy Blue was formed in 1989 in Memphis, Tennessee. The band featured vocalist Todd Poole, drummer Scott "Scotty T." Tramwell, guitarist Sid Fletcher, and bassist Josh Weil. Fletcher and Weil met at the Atlanta Guitar Institute of Technology. The group signed with Geffen Records and released their debut album Want Some? on the label in 1992. The album was produced by Mike Clink, best known for producing Guns N' Roses debut album Appetite for Destruction. Due to the popularity of grunge in the early 1990s, the album did not sell as well as the label had hoped and the group disbanded. According to lead vocalist Todd Poole, Roxy Blue was actually working on demos for a follow-up record when they disbanded.

During the time Roxy Blue was disbanded, vocalist Todd Poole became a founding member of the nu metal band Saliva.

The band reformed with former Every Mother's Nightmare guitarist Jeff Caughron, as original guitarist Sid Fletcher is now a dentist. They released a self-titled album on Frontiers Records in 2019.

== Band members ==
=== Current members ===
- Todd Poole – lead vocals, guitar, keyboards, piano (1989–1994, 2017–present)
- Josh Weil – bass (1989–1994, 2017–present)
- Jeff Caughron – guitar (2017–present)

=== Former members ===
- Sid Fletcher – guitar (1989–1994)
- Scott "Scotty T." Trammell – drums, percussion (1989–1994, 2017–2025; died 2025)
- Wayne Swinny - guitar (1994)

== Discography ==
=== Studio albums ===
- Want Some? (1992, Geffen)
- Want Some More? (2013, FnA Records)
- Stripped (2013, FnA Records)
- Roxy Blue (2019, Frontiers)

=== Live albums ===
- Live at Nightmoves (2013)
