= Drugs, God and the New Republic =

Studio album by Warrior Soul
- Released: 1991
- Genre: Hard rock
- Label: DGC
- Producers: Geoff Workman, Warrior Soul

Warrior Soul chronology
Last Decade Dead Century (1990)	Drugs, God and the New Republic (1991)	Salutations from the Ghetto Nation (1992)

Drugs, God and the New Republic is the second album by the band Warrior Soul released in 1991. It was the first album without drummer Paul Ferguson, who had been replaced by Mark Evans. The band supported the album by taking part in the "Tune in, Turn on, Burn out Tour", with the Sisters of Mercy, Public Enemy, Young Black Teenagers, and Gang of Four.

The album was remastered and re-released with bonus tracks by Escapi Music in 2006.

== Production ==
The album was produced by Geoff Workman and the band. "Interzone" is a cover of the Joy Division song.

== Critical reception ==
Professional ratings
Review scores
Source	Rating
AllMusic	2.5/5 stars
Calgary Herald	B+
Chicago Tribune	1/4 stars

The Indianapolis Star concluded that "hard-rock fans are getting another dose of an unusually intense form of angst." The Calgary Herald wrote that "singer Kory Clarke's lyrics can be flatulent at times, but more often his articulate anger is rare among hard-rockers, blending powerfully with the music, a fist thrust upward through the belly of the American dream."

The Ottawa Citizen stated that "the music is a fire storm of screaming guitars and thundering drums." The Chicago Tribune opined: "This is the roller-coaster world of Relevant Metal; one minute you've got a geopolitical ax to grind, two minutes later you're in the pool with no shorts on, paddling toward the girls in the shallow end."

== Track listing ==
1. "Intro" - 2:49
2. "Interzone" - 2:59
3. "Drugs, God and the New Republic" - 5:17
4. "The Answer" - 4:08
5. "Rocket 88" - 2:38
6. "Jump for Joy" - 5:51
7. "My Time" - 3:47
8. "Real Thing" - 3:38
9. "Man Must Live as One" - 3:36
10. "Hero" - 4:50
11. "The Wasteland" - 4:29
12. "Children of the Winter" - 5:50
13. "Intro (live)" - 4:37 [2006 Escapi Bonus Track]
14. "Interzone (live) - 2:30 [2006 Escapi Bonus Track]
15. "The Answer (live) - 4:16 [2006 Escapi Bonus Track]

== Personnel ==
- Kory Clarke – lead vocals
- John Ricco – guitar
- Pete McClanahan – bass guitar
- Mark Evans – drums

Production

- Mastered by George Marino at Sterling Sound, NYC
