= The Space Age Playboys =

Studio album by Warrior Soul
- Released: July 18, 1994
- Genre: Hard rock
- Length: 59:48
- Label: Music for Nations, Mayhem

Warrior Soul chronology
Chill Pill	The Space Age Playboys	Odds & Ends

The Space Age Playboys is the fifth album by the band Warrior Soul. It was first released in the UK on Music For Nations in 1994. It was released the following year in North America.

The album was remastered and re-released with bonus tracks on CD in 2006 by Escapi Music.

== Critical reception ==
Professional ratings
Review scores
Source	Rating
Kerrang!	5/5 stars
Rock Hard	9.5/10

In 2005, The Space Age Playboys was ranked number 323 in Rock Hard magazine's book of The 500 Greatest Rock & Metal Albums of All Time. Metallica's Lars Ulrich has rated it one of his favourite albums, and invited Warrior Soul to open for them at Donington.

== Track listing ==
All songs written by Clarke / McClanahan / X-Factor.

No.	Title	Length
1.	"Rocket Engines"	3:48
2.	"The Drug"	4:23
3.	"Let's Get Wasted"	4:58
4.	"No No No"	3:18
5.	"Television"	3:35
6.	"The Pretty Faces"	4:32
7.	"The Image"	4:59
8.	"Rotten Soul"	4:29
9.	"I Wanna Get Some"	4:21
10.	"Look at You"	4:01
11.	"Star Ride"	5:11
12.	"Generation Graveyard"	3:45
13.	"Fightin' the War"	4:52
Total length:		56:02

2006 Escapi bonus tracks

No.	Title	Length
14.	"Evo and Pete Bragging (live)"	0:34
15.	"Punk Rock n Roll (live)"	3:13
16.	"Ways to the Gutter (live)"	3:45
17.	"NYC Girl (live)"	2:54
18.	"Punk Reaction (live)"	4:28

== Personnel ==
- Kory Clarke - vocals
- Pete McClanahan - bass & vocals
- X-Factor - guitar & vocals
- Scott Duboys - drums
