= Long Way Back to the Moon =

Studio album by Galactic Cowboys
- Released: November 17, 2017
- Recorded: 2016–2017
- Genre: Heavy metal, progressive metal
- Length: 60:26
- Label: Mascot

Galactic Cowboys chronology
Let It Go (2000)	Long Way Back to the Moon (2017)

Long Way Back to the Moon is the seventh studio album from heavy metal band, Galactic Cowboys. It was released on November 17, 2017 through Mascot Label Group, as their comeback release after a seventeen year hiatus.

== Background ==
In 2015, bass player Monty Colvin was contacted by Jim Pitulski, an A&R for Mascot Records, who offered a contract in return for the band's reunion. Within a year, the band with its original lineup had regrouped and began working on new music. The album was written and recorded in Houston and Kansas City in early 2016, however, the opening track, "In the Clouds", was actually written in 1989 by Doss and Colvin, as the first song the band ever wrote.

== Track listing ==
No.	Title	Length
1.	"In the Clouds"	6:52
2.	"Internal Masquerade"	3:18
3.	"Blood in My Eyes"	3:40
4.	"Next Joke"	4:15
5.	"Zombies"	4:12
6.	"Drama"	4:50
7.	"Amisarewas"	6:16
8.	"Hate Me"	3:11
9.	"Losing Ourselves"	4:12
10.	"Agenda"	4:31
11.	"Long Way Back to the Moon"	5:45

Bonus Tracks
No.	Title	Length
12.	"Believing the Hype"	4:04
13.	"Say Goodbye To Utopia"	5:19

== Personnel ==
- Ben Huggins – vocals, guitar
- Dane Sonnier – vocals, guitars
- Monty Colvin – vocals, bass
- Alan Doss – vocals, drums
