= Fire Fire =

Studio album by Ezo
- Released: May 21, 1989
- Studios: Atlantic Studios, New York City, USA
- Genres: Heavy metal, glam metal
- Length: 48:26
- Label: Geffen
- Producers: Stephan Galfas, Jody Gray, James Palace

Ezo chronology
EZO (1987)	Fire Fire (1989)

Singles from Fire Fire
- 1. "Million Miles Away" Released: 1989

Alternative CD cover

Professional ratings
Review scores
Source	Rating
Collector's Guide to Heavy Metal	7/10

Fire Fire is the second studio album released by Japanese metal band Ezo. It was released on May 21, 1989 on Geffen Records.

== Track listing ==
All songs by EZO and Jody Gray except where indicated.

1. "Love Junkie" – 4:44
2. "Night Crawler" (EZO, Chris Gates, Gray, James Palace) – 4:21
3. "Fire Fire" – 5:51
4. "Wild Talk" – 4:37
5. "Burn Down the Night" – 4:39
6. "Black Moon" – 3:54
7. "Back to Zero" – 4:23
8. "Cold Blooded" (EZO, Gray, Palace, Stephan Galfas) – 3:59
9. "She's Ridin' the Rhythm" (EZO, Gray, Palace) – 3:54
10. "Streetwalker" (EZO, Gray, Palace) – 4:15
11. "Million Miles Away" (EZO, Gates, Gray) – 3:49

== Personnel ==
Band members

- Masaki Yamada – vocals
- Shoyo Iida – guitar
- Taro Takahashi – bass
- Hirotsugu Homma – drums

Additional musicians

- John Mahoney – Sinclavier programming, backing vocals
- Steve Grimmett, Jody Gray, Stephan Galfas, James Palace, Noah 'T.T.' Baron, Mark Corbin, Mio Vukovic, Norio Yamamoto, The Weed – backing vocals

Production

- Stephan Galfas – producer, mixing
- Jody Gray, James Palace – associate producers
- Mark Corbin, Ellen Fitton – engineers
- Noah Baron – mixing
- George Marino – mastering at Sterling Sound, New York
- Norio Yamamoto – coordinator
