= Galactic Cowboys =

American heavy metal band

- Galactic Cowboys, 1991

Background information
- Origin: Houston, Texas, U.S.
- Genres: Heavy metal; progressive metal; alternative metal
- Years active: 1989–2000; 2009; 2013; 2016–present
- Labels: DGC; Geffen; Metal Blade; Music Theories; Mascot
- Members: Monty Colvin; Ben Huggins; Dane Sonnier; Bozz Miller
- Past members: Alan Doss; Wally Farkas; Johnny Simmons
- Website: galacticcowboys.com

Galactic Cowboys is an American heavy metal band based in Houston, Texas. They combine progressive metal with a vocal style influenced by The Beatles and the heavy playing style of thrash bands such as Anthrax. They have been described as "possibly the most melodic metal band ever to exist in Christian or general markets." Although the band members are Christians, they did not consider Galactic Cowboys to be a Christian band. The band has toured with prominent hard rock and metal acts such as Anthrax, Dream Theater, King's X and Overkill. Despite their general lack of commercial success, the band garnered a cult following throughout its existence.

Galactic Cowboys first gained attention through their association with producer/manager Sam Taylor and tours with King's X, and were subsequently offered a major label record contract by DGC Records. The band's debut album, Galactic Cowboys (1991), was overshadowed by the surprise success of Nirvana's Nevermind shortly after its release, and the band were dropped from DGC following the release of the similarly unsuccessful follow-up album Space In Your Face (1993). The band signed to Metal Blade Records in 1995, and released four albums with the label, featuring a simpler heavy metal/alternative metal sound, before breaking up two months prior to the release of the band's sixth studio album, Let It Go, in 2000. Following a number of reunion shows in 2009 and 2013, Galactic Cowboys was reformed in 2016 with the original line-up, and released their first studio album in seventeen years, Long Way Back to the Moon, in 2017 through Mascot Records.

A new album, What Planet Are You From? is scheduled for release in 2026.

== History ==
=== Original existence (1989–2000) ===
Galactic Cowboys was formed in 1989 in Houston, Texas by bassist Monty Colvin and drummer Alan Doss of the band The Awful Truth. When The Awful Truth broke up, Colvin and Doss joined singer Ben Huggins and guitarist Dane Sonnier to form Galactic Cowboys.

In 1990, after attracting the attention of A&R rep Gary Gersh, the band signed a million-dollar record contract with DGC/Geffen Records. Geffen touted the Galactic Cowboys as their "next big thing". The band released their debut album, Galactic Cowboys, in August 1991, though its release was delayed for several months by Geffen. Despite receiving some favourable reviews, and getting circulation of the music video for "I'm Not Amused" on MTV, the band was ignored by DGC due to the surprise success of Nirvana's Nevermind, released a month afterwards. After poor sales and some touring, they returned to the studio and released Space in Your Face in 1993. During the album's recording process, the band fell out with Sam Taylor over the album's production, and parted ways with him before the album's release due to creative differences. Space... was the band's break into the general market. The album featured two minor hits for the band with "If I Were A Killer" and "I Do What I Do", both of which received regular airplay at MTV and the now-defunct radio station ZROCK.

Two months into Space In Your Face's promotional tour, DGC pulled the band's touring support and dropped the band, forcing the band to cancel a planned European tour and return home. In June 1995, depressed and disappointed with the band's lack of success, Dane Sonnier and Alan Doss left the band, resulting in Galactic Cowboys temporarily breaking up. Two weeks after the breakup, Monty Colvin received a voicemail from Metal Blade Records with an offer to sign to the band. Metal Blade's founder, Brian Slagel, had previously offered the band a recording contract with the label in 1993 in the event that DGC dropped the band. Subsequently, the Galactic Cowboys quickly reformed, with the band's guitar tech Wally Farkas replacing Sonnier on guitar (as Sonnier showed no interest in re-joining the band). The band released a third album, Machine Fish, and an EP titled Feel the Rage in 1996. The album The Horse That Bud Bought followed in 1997, departing from the band's metal sound into a toned-down style.

The band recorded At the End of the Day in 1998, a concept album regarded by fans as the band's peak effort. Two weeks before the album's release, drummer Alan Doss left the band. Session drummer Erick Tatuaka performed drums on the subsequent tour.

The band's final album of their four-album Metal Blade Records contract, Let It Go, was released on June 20, 2000, and featured lead vocal performances by each band member. King's X drummer Jerry Gaskill, a friend of the band, performed drums on the album. Prior to its release, on April 28, 2000, the Galactic Cowboys announced that they had decided to disband. While the band's reason for their disbandment at the time was so the bandmembers could focus on their own solo projects, Monty Colvin later cited the band's frustration at their lack of direction or success as the primary cause. "I just felt like we weren’t going anywhere and I was just very frustrated." The band did not tour in support of the album or play any farewell shows, with Ben Huggins saying they would likely never tour again unless they received an "incredibly amazing" offer to reunite.

=== Reunion (2009–present) ===
Besides original songs, Galactic Cowboys have recorded cover versions of songs by Kiss, Petra and Wings.

The band performed 3 reunion shows in August 2009 in Houston, Dallas, and Austin. Following these shows, Wally Farkas permanently quit the band. The band's original line-up reunited for a special, one-off performance at Acadia Bar and Grill in Houston, Texas on September 13, 2013.

On July 4, 2016, they announced via bassist Monty's Rockcast podcast (No. 176) that they had signed with a progressive record label and were working on a new album with the original lineup (Colvin, Huggins, Doss, Sonnier). On November 17, 2017, Mascot Label Group released the new album, titled Long Way Back to the Moon.

Galactic Cowboys announced a new album via Kickstarter in the Summer of 2024. This was funded and raised nearly $90,000 for the band to produce their own record for their fans. This project was originally titled "A New Mission". Ben, Monty, and Dane started writing new music. Unfortunately Alan Doss decided not to participate with this project and was replaced by Johnny Simmons, Doss' bandmate from Houston-area cover band The Rikkis, who also played drums on Atomic Opera's Gospel Cola album. Simmons recorded the new album but then passed away suddenly on February 16th, 2025. The new album is targeted for release in the late summer of 2026 under the title, What Planet Are You From? In July of 2026, the band revealed their new drummer, Bozz Miller of Houston, TX.

== Members ==
=== Monty Colvin ===
Bassist and backing vocalist for Galactic Cowboys from 1991 until 2000, Monty Colvin embarked on a solo career in 2000 with his band project Crunchy. The first album, All Day Sucker, released in 2001, defined the Crunchy sound as fun, pop punk with a slight heavy guitar edge. On Crunchy's second album, Clown School Dropout, the band was stripped down to Colvin playing most of the instruments and bringing in a hired drummer; here Colvin added a bit more crunch to the formula. Band influences include the Wildhearts, Cheap Trick, Foo Fighters, and the Ramones, in addition to the aforementioned Galactic Cowboys. The third Crunchy album, Loserville (2007), includes a contribution by Kerry Livgren of Kansas. Colvin contributed to Livgren's 2021 solo release The Resurrection Of Lazarus: A Cantata though his part had been recorded 20 years earlier.

Colvin currently hosts an irregular hour-long Internet podcast called "Monty's Rockcast" on his personal web site. He also sells his paintings on his web site; some of the Galactic Cowboys album covers featured Colvin's artwork.

Colvin is also a cousin of Dee Dee Ramone (Douglas Glenn Colvin), formerly of the Ramones.

=== Alan Doss ===
Since leaving the music industry for a while, Doss has involved himself with managing and producing. Most recently, he has served in that capacity for the bands Ashbury Keys, Toy Subs and Jambi's Revenge, also contributing instrumental work (on keyboards and bass) to the outputs of those bands.

=== Ben Huggins ===
Huggins' musical activities following the Galactic Cowboys breakup in 2000 included recording and playing with his band Gristle, in addition to guest appearances with artists such as The Phlegmatics. Gristle's first album, Cold Blue Sky, was released in downloadable format on July 17, 2010.

=== Wally Farkas ===
Farkas has worked as a distributor for hip hop artists in the Houston area. He teamed with Ty Tabor of King's X to release two ambient albums under the name Xenuphobe ("1.0", released in 2006 and "2.0: Electrolux", released in 2007). Also, he established a record label, Molken Music for a handful of artists with which he has had prior connections.

Farkas co-produced and played guitar on the Doug Pinnick album Strum Sum Up. He announced a forthcoming solo album, Past Due, but that is unreleased as of yet.

In 2015, he was part of dUg Pinnick's touring band, Texas Poundation. He also has toured as part of the Houston band Peace and the Chaos.

=== Dane Sonnier ===
After leaving Galactic Cowboys, Sonnier kept involved in the music world, most notably in The Sonnier Brothers Band, the band he formed with his brother Len, who also plays lead guitar in Gristle. Sonnier also served as lead guitarist for a Houston-based modern rock band, Sevenfold. Like Farkas, he has also been part of Texas Poundation, and continues to do so even after re-joining Galactic Cowboys.

== Appearances in other media ==
- The band appeared in the 1994 movie Airheads, under the name "Sons of Thunder". The one original song they performed for that movie, "Don't Hate Me Because I'm Beautiful", is not available anywhere, and only a short excerpt is heard in the movie.

== Band members ==
Current

- Monty Colvin - bass guitar, vocals (1989–2000, 2009, 2013, 2016–present)
- Ben Huggins - lead vocals, guitar, blues harp (1989–2000, 2009, 2013, 2016–present)
- Dane Sonnier - guitar, vocals (1989–1995, 2009, 2013, 2016–present)
- Bozz Miller - drums (2026-)

Past members

- Alan Doss - drums, vocals, keyboards (1989–1998, 2009, 2013, 2016–2024)
- Wally Farkas - guitar, vocals, keyboards (1995–2000, 2009), drums (1998–2000)
- Jerry Gaskill - drums (studio) (2000)
- Johnny Simmons - drums, vocals (studio) (2024-2025, died 2025)
- Erick Tatuaka - drums (touring) (1999)

Timeline

== Discography ==
- Galactic Cowboys August 20, 1991
- Space in Your Face June 8, 1993
- Machine Fish January 30, 1996
- Feel the Rage (EP) October 8, 1996
- The Horse That Bud Bought July 15, 1997
- At the End of the Day September 22, 1998
- Let It Go June 20, 2000
- Long Way Back to the Moon November 17, 2017
- What Planet Are You From? July 01, 2026

== Music videos ==
Music videos were produced for the following songs:

- "Evil Twin"
- "Fear Not"
- "Feel the Rage"
- "I'm Not Amused"
- "If I Were a Killer"
- "Nothing to Say"
- "Internal Masquerade"
- "Zombies"
