= Ezo (band) =

Japanese heavy metal band

EZO
- Also known as: Flatbacker
- Origin: Sapporo, Japan
- Genres: Heavy metal, glam metal
- Years active: 1982–1990
- Labels: Victor, Geffen Records
- Past members: Masaki Yamada; Taro Takahashi; Shoyo Iida; Hirotsugu Homma

EZO (イーズィーオー, Iiziiō) was a Japanese heavy metal band originally formed as Flatbacker in the spring of 1982 in Sapporo, Japan out of the remnants of two high school bands, Power-Station and Scrap. EZO has been named a "seminal influence by such artists as Steve McDonald of Redd Kross and Michael Steele of The Bangles."

== History ==
EZO consisted of Masaki Yamada (vocals), Taro Takahashi (bass), Shoyo Iida (guitar) and Hiro Homma (drums). They released one demo cassette (Minagoroshi) in 1984 and two albums (1985's Senzo and 1986's Esa) in Japan as Flatbacker in the mid-1980s before coming to the U.S. Rumor has it that Gene Simmons of Kiss, who produced their self-titled U.S. debut album, was behind the band's name change to EZO, inspired by Ezo, an ancient name for Hokkaidō. They released two albums for Geffen Records, 1987's EZO and 1989's Fire Fire, before being dropped from the label and internal differences led to the band's demise.

Vocalist Masaki Yamada joined fellow Japanese heavy metal band Loudness in 1992 and drummer Hiro Homma joined Loudness in 1994. In 2000, the original Loudness lineup reunited and Masaki and Hiro left the band. Hiro Homma was the drummer for the Japanese metal band Anthem from 2001 to 2013 and vocalist Masaki Yamada is now the bass player for the New York-based band FiRESiGN.

A single guitar riff from EZO song "House of 1,000 Pleasures" served as the signature sound of syndicated radio network Z Rock.

== Discography ==
=== Studio albums ===
Year	Title	JP	US
1984	Minagoroshi(皆殺し) (Demo, as 'Fratvacker')		
1985	Accident(戦争) (as 'Flatbacker')		
1986	Esa(餌) (as 'Flatbacker')		
1987	EZO	6	150
1989	Fire Fire	19	

=== Singles ===
Year	Title
1985	"Hard Blow" / "Deathwish" (as 'Flatbacker')
1987	"House of 1000 Pleasures" / "Desiree"
1987	"Here It Comes"
1987	"Flashback Heart Attack"
1989	"Million Miles Away"

=== Videos ===
Year	Title
1985	War is Over (as 'Flatbacker')
1988	E・Z・O
2004	Returns

== See also ==
- List of glam metal bands and artists
