= At the End of the Day (Galactic Cowboys album) =

At The End Of The Day

Studio album by Galactic Cowboys
- Released: September 22, 1998
- Recorded: Sunflower Studios - Houston, Texas - March–June 1998
- Genres: Heavy metal, progressive metal
- Length: 65:37
- Label: Metal Blade
- Producer: Alan Doss

Galactic Cowboys chronology
The Horse That Bud Bought (1997)	At The End Of The Day (1998)	Let It Go (2000)

Professional ratings
Review scores
Source	Rating
AllMusic	2.5/5 stars
CCM Magazine	(not rated)
Collector's Guide to Heavy Metal	8/10
Cross Rhythms	10/10 medals
HM Magazine	(not rated)
The Phantom Tollbooth	(not rated)
Rock Brigade	7/10
YouthWorker Journal	(not rated)

At the End of the Day is the fifth studio album from heavy metal band, Galactic Cowboys. Multiple reviewers found that the album contained subtle references to Christianity, but provided plenty of subtext to interpret meanings with.

== Notes ==
- The album contains the band's Machine Fish Suite, a series of songs woven together, telling the story of the band up to that point (tracks 4–10 inclusive).
- Drummer Alan Doss does lead vocals on the song "Through".
- The Japanese version of this album contained the song, "The Things They Couldn't Say", which was recorded in 1994, with lead vocals by then guitarist Dane Sonnier.

== Track listing ==
No.	Title	Writer(s)	Length
1.	"Nothing To Say"	Huggins	4:36
2.	"Ants"	Farkas, Colvin	4:05
3.	"Just Like Me"	Farkas, Huggins	4:28
4.	"Where Do I Sign?"	Colvin	2:49
5.	"Bright Horizons"	Colvin	1:23
6.	"Puppet Show"	Colvin	5:12
7.	"Mr. Magnet"	Colvin	2:59
8.	"Never Understand"	Colvin	4:18
9.	"Ranch On Mars Pt. 2 (Set Me Free)"	Colvin	4:19
10.	"How Does It Feel?"	Colvin	3:32
11.	"Young Man's Dream"	Huggins	4:42
12.	"Shine"	Doss, Huggins	4:09
13.	"The Shape"	Huggins, Doss	3:46
14.	"It's Not Over"	Colvin	4:49
15.	"Through"	Doss	7:21
16.	"At The End Of The Day"	Farkas	3:09

== Credits ==
- Ben Huggins – Vocals, guitar, blues harp
- Wally Farkas – Guitar, vocals, keyboards
- Monty Colvin – Vocals, bass
- Alan Doss – Drums, vocals
