= Cycle Sluts from Hell =

American heavy metal band (1986–1992; 2006-07)

- Origin: New York City, New York, U.S.
- Genres: Heavy metal; glam metal
- Years active: 1986–1992, 2006, 2007
- Label: Epic
- Members: Queen Vixen; She-Fire of Ice; Honey 1%er Lord Roadkill; Tony Wolfmann; Nick Marden; Ash Gray
- Past members: Venus Penis Crusher (a.k.a. Betty Kallas); Donna She Wolf; Scott Duboys; Tom Von Doom; Chris Moffett

The Cycle Sluts from Hell were an American heavy metal band, active from 1986 to 1992. The band was made up of four women, singing under the stage names Queen Vixen, She-Fire of Ice, Honey One Percenter, and Venus Penis Crusher, with a group of backing musicians including Pete Lisa, Christopher Moffett, Tom Von Doom, Fernando Rosario, Brian Smith, Scott Duboys, Bobby Gustafson, and Eddie Coen. They released one self-titled album in 1991.

== Career ==
The band's music was primarily written by Pete Lisa, with contributions from Daniel Rey, Mark Durado, Christopher Moffett, and Tom Von Doom. They performed around the New York City area in the late 1980s, playing shows with Jane's Addiction at The Cat Club, Danzig at The Old Studio 54, and Joey Ramone at the Ritz and the Palladium.

The band's self-titled debut album was their only release. Their best known track is "I Wish You Were a Beer", written by Honey One Percenter and Tom Von Doom. The track featured in the MTV show Beavis and Butthead, receiving a positive response. The band's most high-profile performance was a European tour with Motörhead in the early nineties.

On July 24, 2006, some of the original band played a reunion show at The Delancey in New York, where the line-up included Queen Vixen, Honey 1percenter, She Fire of Ice, Lord Roadkill, and Scott Duboys. They reunited again on October 31, 2007, for the Motherfucker Halloween party at Club Rebel in New York, where the line-up included Queen Vixen, Honey 1percenter, She Fire of Ice, and Lord Roadkill (accompanied by Nick Marden from The Stimulators on bass and She Wolves' Tony Mann).

== Past members ==
- Venus Penis Crusher, a.k.a. Betty Kallas, went on to the industrial duo Hanzel und Gretyl.
- Donna She Wolf is now writing and playing guitar in the New Orleans-based band Star & Dagger, a collaboration with Sean Yseult (White Zombie) that began in 2010, along with vocalist Von Hesseling, Dave Catching (Eagles of Death Metal) on guitar, and Gene Trautmann (Queens of the Stone Age) on drums. She also formed the group She Wolves with Tony Mann around 2000. Their early material was released on Poptown Records, including collaborations with punk musicians Sylvain Sylvain and Jayne County.
- Scott Duboys, drums, had previously played for Nuclear Assault, Cities, VonHelsing, and then joined Warrior Soul after CSFH.
- Tom Von Doom, bass, co-wrote the single "I Wish You Were a Beer", and previously played with Bebe Buell and The Great Kat. He produced the song "Waiting" by Jamie Coon, featured in the CBS show Ghost Whisperer.
- Chris Moffett went on to replace John Ricco of Warrior Soul for one CD and a European tour.

== Discography ==
- Cycle Sluts from Hell (self-titled, Epic Records, 1991)
