= Chill Pill =

Studio album by Warrior Soul
- Released: 1993
- Genre: Hard rock
- Label: Geffen
- Producers: Kory Clarke, Don Fury

Warrior Soul chronology
Salutations from the Ghetto Nation (1992)	Chill Pill (1993)	The Space Age Playboys (1994)

Chill Pill is the fourth album by the American hard rock band Warrior Soul, released in 1993. It was remastered and re-released with bonus tracks in 2006 by Escapi Music. Michael Monroe of Hanoi Rocks played harmonica on "High Road".

== Critical reception ==
Professional ratings
Review scores
Source	Rating
AllMusic	2/5 stars
Calgary Herald	B
Rock Hard	7.5/10

The Calgary Herald noted the "high intensity mile-a-minute guitars, bottom string bass chords and drums like hammers hitting nail heads."

AllMusic wrote that "its entire first half (kicked off in typical Warrior Soul fashion by an angry psycho-babble rant set to music entitled 'Mars') rolls by without a single memorable moment."

== Track listing ==
1. "Mars" – 2:21
2. "Cargos of Doom" – 3:55
3. "Song in Your Mind" – 4:52
4. "Shock Um Down" – 3:06
5. "Let Me Go" – 4:45
6. "Ha Ha Ha" – 5:01
7. "Concrete Frontier" – 7:21
8. "I Want Some" – 3:11
9. "Soft" – 6:25
10. "High Road" – 6:37
11. "Mars (Live)" – 2:45 [2006 Escapi bonus track]
12. "Cargos of Doom (Live)" – 3:48 [2009 Escapi bonus rack]
13. "Song in Your Mind (Live)" – 4:43 [2009 Escapi bonus track]
14. "Shock Um Down (Live)" – 2:53 [2009 Escapi bonus track]
15. "Mark & Kory Interview / New drummer Pete (The Tempest)" – 3:16 [2009 Escapi bonus track]

== Personnel ==
- Kory Clarke – lead vocals
- John Ricco – guitar
- Pete McClanahan – bass
- Mark Evans – drums

Additional musician

- Michael Monroe – harmonica on “High Road”
