= Mummy Calls (album) =

Studio album by Mummy Calls
- Released: 1986
- Recorded: 1985
- Genre: Pop rock, new wave
- Label: Geffen
- Producer: Hugh Padgham, John Luongo

Mummy Calls is the debut album released by British band Mummy Calls, released in 1986. Two singles were issued from the album, "Let's Go" and "Beauty Has Her Way". The latter single was used in the film The Lost Boys and also appears on that film's soundtrack. The band split shortly after the release of their debut.

== Track listing ==
1. "Kiss Me" (Alan Bint, Paul Brook, David Banks)
2. "Sexual Desire" (Bint, Brook, Banks)
3. "We Will" (Bint, Banks)
4. "Let's Go" (Banks)
5. "Beauty Has Her Way" (Brook, Banks)
6. "Deadly Night" (Brook, Banks)
7. "Chestnut Tree" (Banks)
8. "In the Darkness" (Brook, Banks)
9. "Message on My Door" (Banks)
10. "Jane I'll Kiss You in the Desert" (Banks)

== Personnel ==
- David Banks - vocals
- Alan Bint - keyboards
- Andrew Hingley - bass
- Paul Howard - saxophone
- Paul Brook - drums
- Management: Brian Lane

=== Additional musicians ===
- David Rhodes - guitar on "Kiss Me", "Sexual Desire", "We Will" and "Deadly Night"
- Linda Taylor - backing vocals
- Tessa Niles - backing vocals
- Helena - backing vocals
- Ester Benjamin - backing vocals
- Kayley Stephenson - backing vocals
- Billy Hamilton - backing vocals
- Elisa Richards - backing vocals

== Production credits ==
- Producer - John Luongo ("Kiss Me", "Sexual Desire", "We Will", "Let's Go" & "Deadly Night")
- Producer - Hugh Padgham ("Beauty Has Her Way", "Chestnut Tree", "In the Darkness", "Message on My Door" & "Jane I'll Kiss You in the Desert")
- Mixed by Julian Mendelsohn & John Luongo
- Engineered by Gary Helman, Hugh Padgham & Alan Douglas
- Assistant engineers: Croydon, Renny, Spike, Martin & Paul
- Recorded at The Townhouse Studios & Sarm West Studios, London
- DMM Direct Metal Mastering
- Band technician: Richard

=== Additional credits ===
- Art direction: Jeri McManus
- Design: Kim Champagne
- Front cover art: Lori Lobstoeter
- Special thanks to Rovena Cardiel
- All songs copyrighted 1986, by Chappell & Co. Ltd.
