= Warrior Soul =

American rock band

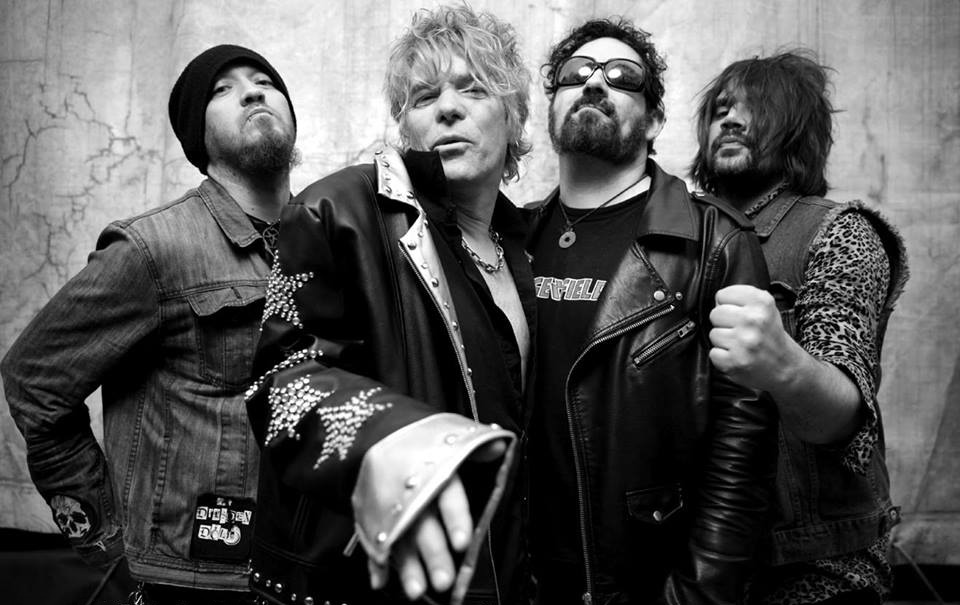
- Warrior Soul in 2016

Background information
- Origin: New York City, U.S.
- Genres: Hard rock; alternative metal
- Years active: 1987–1995, 2000, 2007–present
- Label: Geffen Records
- Members: Kory Clarke; Adam Arling; Christian Kimmett; Nate Arling
- Past members: See below

Warrior Soul is an American rock band formed by lead singer and producer Kory Clarke. Clarke started the band following a bet from a promoter at New York City's Pyramid Club after a solo performance art show titled "Kory Clarke/Warrior Soul". He was determined to have the best band in the city within six months. Nine months later, he signed a multi-album deal with Geffen Records.

== History ==
Kory Clarke originally entered the music scene as a drummer for several bands, including Detroit punks L-Seven (not to be confused with the all-female Los Angeles band L7), Pennsylvania Southern rockers Raging Slab, and a Kim Fowley project called "The Trial." After moving to New York City, Clarke began performing one-man shows in the realm of performance art. Although he believed rock bands to be less artistic, he was persuaded to reform a band, which he named Warrior Soul after a line in a George S. Patton docudrama.

The band began performing in New York City in 1987 and soon attracted the attention of Geffen, who signed them. Geffen directed Clarke to replace his hired band with new players. Clarke insisted on retaining Pete McClanahan as his bass player and recruited guitarist John Ricco and former Killing Joke drummer Paul Ferguson.

In 1990, Warrior Soul released their first album, Last Decade Dead Century. AllMusic reviewer Eduardo Rivadavia compared it to Nirvana's Nevermind, stating that although comparable success eluded Warrior Soul, it explored similar themes. Rivadavia speculated that the nihilism of Nevermind may have resonated more with Generation X.

In 1991, Mark Evans replaced Ferguson on drums, and the band released their second album, Drugs, God and the New Republic, which further amplified their anarchist leanings. A nationwide support tour with Queensrÿche (with whom they shared management from the Q Prime agency) followed.

The following year saw the release of the band's third album, 1992's Salutations from the Ghetto Nation, as Clarke's relationship with Geffen soured. His interviews became increasingly bitter, often targeting the record label, which he accused of ignoring the group's potential. Eventually, Clarke declared an all-out war, claiming that the band's fourth release, 1993's Chill Pill, had been deliberately botched to fulfill the band's contract. This strategy appeared to be effective, and by early 1994, Warrior Soul was dropped by Geffen.

A series of lineup changes followed. Longtime guitarist John Ricco was ousted and replaced by two new guitarists: Alexander Arundel (also known as X-Factor and Gene Poole) and Chris Moffet (former Cycle Sluts from Hell lead guitarist). Not long after, Mark Evans and Chris Moffet departed. During this time, former Nuclear Assault/Cities/Cycle Sluts from Hell drummer Scott Duboys joined the band. The lineup now consisted of Clarke, Arundel, McClanahan, and Duboys. Clarke aimed to reinvent Warrior Soul as self-appointed cyberpunks for their fifth album, 1994's The Space Age Playboys, released on the independent Futurist label. He also added old friend and collaborator Peter Jay on rhythm guitar. While touring in support of the album, Warrior Soul headlined the 1995 Kerrang! UK tour and performed at the 1995 Dynamo Open Air Festival, as well as the 1995 Donington Monsters of Rock concert.

After the performance of their last live show in September 1995, Arundel, Duboys, and longtime bassist McClanahan quit the band, leading to Clarke's decision to retire Warrior Soul later that year.

In 1996, Odds & Ends was released as a collection of demos recorded on an eight-track with Arundel, along with leftover material that was originally intended for release on Elektra Records.

The "classic" lineup of Clarke, Ricco, McClanahan, and Evans later reunited for a short tour and to enter the studio to re-record twelve of the band's songs, which were released on Dream Catcher Records as Classics in 2000. All Warrior Soul albums were remastered and re-released on CD and MP3 in 2006 and 2009, including bonus material (mostly live songs originally released as B-sides). The first three albums were also re-released on vinyl in 2009.

Clarke states that many of their songs are politically based, such as "Blown Away," "Superpower Dreamland," "In Conclusion," and "Children of the Winter." He describes the band's sound as "acid punk," particularly their album The Space Age Playboys.

Drummer Mark Evans was murdered in London, England, in 2005, at the age of 48.

Bass player Pete McClanahan died at home in Cranston, Rhode Island, on 16 February 2022, at the age of 61.

== Reformation ==
In 2007, Clarke revived the name and has been recording and touring with an ever-changing cast of musicians under the "Warrior Soul" moniker ever since.

Initially setting out on a tour of the UK, a live album soon followed. In 2008, the band released a new studio album, originally titled Chinese Democracy (as a dig at the long-delayed Guns N' Roses release), but it was quickly renamed Destroy the War Machine.

In 2012, another new lineup released the studio album Stiff Middle Finger, co-produced by Sue Gere and Kory Clarke. This lineup featured Lundell still on guitar, joined by "Johnny H" and Xevi "Strings" Abellán, with Danny Engstrom and Sue Gere on bass and drums, respectively, played by Freddie Cocker Kvarnebrink. Former band member John Ricco made a guest appearance on guitar, as did The Mission guitarist Mark Gemini Thwaite. The band embarked on a month-long European tour in November 2012, followed by a brief tour through the Eastern United States in December. Original bass player Pete McClanahan joined the live lineup for a few months in 2013. Christian Kimmett joined the band on bass in 2013 after McClanahan's departure, and Stevie Pearce joined on guitar a year later. This lineup undertook extensive touring in Europe and the US over the next three years, releasing a live album, Tough As Fuck, in 2016. In 2017, they released a new studio album—Back on the Lash—with yet another new lineup, which included the rhythm section from Urge Overkill, Adam and Nate Arling, joined by guitarist John 'Full Throttle' Polachek.

In 2014, Clarke released a solo album recorded in Porto, Portugal, titled Payback's A Bitch. Co-produced by Andre Indiana, with backing vocals by Monica Ferraz, this album showcased the diverse sides of Clarke's musical abilities. Rolling Stone Germany awarded the album a full score.

== Musical style ==
Eduardo Rivadavia of AllMusic described the band as "an outspoken hard rock outfit," whose "incendiary mix of anarchic art-rock and alternative heavy metal earned them a multi-album deal with Geffen Records."

== Band members ==
=== Current members ===
- Kory Clarke – vocals
- Adam Arling – guitars
- Christian Kimmett – bass
- Nate Arling – drums

=== Former members ===
- Pete McClanahan – bass
- Dennis Post – guitars
- Stevie Pearce - Guitar
- John Ricco – guitars
- Paul Ferguson – drums
- Mark Evans - drums
- Alexander "X-Factor" Arundel – guitars
- Miguel Martins – guitars
- Chris Moffet – guitars
- Scott Duboys – drums
- Mike McNamara – bass
- Peter Jay – guitars
- Rille Lundell – guitars
- Rob "Stevo" Stephenson – drums
- Janne Jarvis – bass
- Johnny H – guitars
- Danny Engstrom – bass
- Sue Gere – bass
- Xevi "Strings" Abellán – guitars
- Johan Lindström – drums
- John "Full Throttle" Polachek – guitars
- Hector D – drums

== Discography ==
Studio albums

- Last Decade Dead Century (1990)
- Drugs, God and the New Republic (1991)
- Salutations from the Ghetto Nation (1992)
- Chill Pill (1993)
- The Space Age Playboys (1994)
- Odds & Ends (1996) (also released under the title Fucker in Europe)
- Classics (2000)
- Live in England (2008)
- Destroy the War Machine (2009) (originally released as Chinese Democracy, also released as ...And We Rock and Roll!)
- Stiff Middle Finger (2012)
- Tough as Fuck: Live in Athens (2016)
- Back on the Lash (2017)
- Rock 'N' Roll Disease (2019)
- Cocaine And Other Good Stuff (2020)
- Out on Bail (2022)

Singles

- "We Cry Out" (1990)
- "The Losers" (1990)
- "Hero" (1991)
- "The Wasteland" (1991)
- "Ghetto Nation" (1992)
- "Love Destruction" (1992)
- "Shock Um Down" (1993)
- "Space Age Singles" (1995)
