= Galactic Cowboys (album) =

Studio album by Galactic Cowboys
- Released: August 20, 1991
- Recorded: 1990
- Studios: Rampart Studios, Houston, Texas
- Genres: Heavy metal, progressive metal
- Length: 59:34
- Label: DGC
- Producer: Sam Taylor

Galactic Cowboys chronology
Galactic Cowboys (1991)	Space In Your Face (1993)

Professional ratings
Review scores
Source	Rating
AllMusic	4/5 stars
Chicago Tribune	3/4 stars
Collector's Guide to Heavy Metal	8/10
Cross Rhythms	10/10 medals
The Encyclopedia of Popular Music	4/5 stars
Kerrang!	4/5 stars
Metal Forces	95/100
Metal Hammer	5/5
Rock Hard	9/10
Vox	8/10

Galactic Cowboys is the debut album from the band of the same name. The album was called "The most exciting release of 1991" by HM Magazine editor Doug Van Pelt.

== Notes ==
- At the end of this album, bassist Monty Colvin can be heard reading a school lunch menu.
- Audio clips of Neil Armstrong talking to Houston control can be heard in both "Sea of Tranquility" and "Pump Up The Space Suit".
- The song "Kaptain Krude" is written about the Exxon Valdez oil spill which happened in 1989.
- In 2005, Rock Hard ranked the album at number 187 on their list of the "500 Greatest Rock & Metal Albums of All Time".

== Track listing ==
No.	Title	Writer(s)	Length
1.	"I'm Not Amused"	Colvin, Doss, Huggins	6:26
2.	"My School"	Colvin, Doss, Huggins	6:42
3.	"Why Can't You Believe in Me"	Colvin, Doss, Huggins	6:34
4.	"Kaptain Krude"	Colvin	5:57
5.	"Someone for Everyone"	Colvin	6:27
6.	"Sea of Tranquility"	Colvin, Doss, Huggins	7:22
7.	"Kill Floor"	Colvin	5:06
8.	"Pump Up the Space Suit"	Colvin, Doss, Huggins, Sonnier	1:20
9.	"Ranch on Mars Reprise"	Colvin, Doss, Huggins, Sonnier	2:10
10.	"Speak to Me" (ends at 10:06; hidden track "Jazz Old Horsey" begins at 10:17)	Colvin, Huggins	11:30

== Personnel ==
- Ben Huggins - vocals, acoustic guitar, blues harp
- Dane Sonnier - guitar, vocals
- Monty Colvin - bass, vocals
- Alan Doss - drums, vocals, attempted clarinet

=== Guest musician ===
- Max Dyer - cello
