= Mummy Calls =

- Origin: Leamington Spa, England
- Genres: Pop, rock, power pop, new wave
- Years active: 1982–1987
- Label: Geffen
- Past members: David Banks; Alan Bint; Paul Brook; Andrew Hingley; Paul Howard; David Everingham; Louis Foley; Eugene Mullan

Mummy Calls were a British pop rock/power pop band based in Leamington Spa. The group is best known for their single "Beauty Has Her Way", which was prominently featured in the film The Lost Boys.

== History ==
Mummy Calls were formed in 1982 and were active throughout the early to mid-1980s. The line-up consisted of vocalist David Banks, keyboardist Alan Bint, drummer David Everingham - replaced in 1984 by Paul Brook (formerly of Level 42), bassist Andrew Hingley (brother of Tom Hingley of the Inspiral Carpets) and saxophonist Paul Howard.

Following a bidding war, Mummy Calls signed with Geffen Records and issued their self-titled debut album in 1986.

The first single from the album, "Beauty Has Her Way", was released to critical acclaim followed by "Let's Go" which received a more indifferent response.

The band achieved their enduring fame when "Beauty Has Her Way" was used on the multi-million selling soundtrack of the vampire film The Lost Boys (Joel Schumacher 1987). The song, soundtrack and film maintain a level of cult status.

A shift in priorities at the band's record label halted the group's chart rise in the U.S. and U.K. as promotional dollars were spent on other artists on the roster. The group disbanded in 1987 in order to free themselves from their record contract.

=== After disbandment ===
Vocalist David Banks later joined the group Unicorn Jones in 1996 with former It Bites members John Beck and Dick Nolan.

David Banks is an author and solo artist who lives in London.

Drummer Paul Brook became an in-demand session drummer, touring and recording with Nik Kershaw, Gary Moore, Greg Lake, Bonnie Tyler, Pino Palladino and The Dream Academy. Brook died on May 3, 2007, following a battle with cancer.

Bass guitarist, Andrew Hingley, worked in professional audio as a musician, R&D engineer, product specialist and sales manager. He died in 2023 at the age of 62.

== Discography ==
=== Albums ===
- Mummy Calls (1986)

=== Singles ===
Year	Song	US Hot 100	US MSR	UK Singles	Album
1983	"Mary, I Swear"				
1986	"Beauty Has Her Way"				Mummy Calls
1986	"Let's Go"				Mummy Calls

=== Soundtrack appearances ===
- The Lost Boys (1987)
