= Rick Rubin production discography =

Rick Rubin is an American music producer who holds eight Grammy Awards, including Album of the Year which he won with The Chicks (then named Dixie Chicks) in 2007 and Adele in 2012. He has also won numerous Producer of the Year awards. This is a list compiling his production discography.

== 1980s ==
- 1981: The Pricks – The Pricks
- 1983: Hose – Hose
- 1984: T La Rock & Jazzy Jay – "It's Yours"
- 1984: LL Cool J – "I Need a Beat"
- 1985: Beastie Boys – "Rock Hard"
- 1985: Run-DMC – King of Rock (mixing)
- 1985: Jazzy Jay – "Def Jam/Cold Chillin' in the Spot"
- 1985: Jimmy Spicer – "This Is It / Beat the Clock"
- 1985: LL Cool J – Radio
- 1986: Run-DMC – Raising Hell
- 1986: Slayer – Reign in Blood
- 1986: Beastie Boys – Licensed to Ill
- 1986: Original Concept – "Can You Feel It? / Knowledge Me"
- 1986: Junkyard Band – "The Word" / "Sardines"
- 1987: Public Enemy – Yo! Bum Rush the Show (exec.)
- 1987: The Cult – Electric
- 1987: Run-DMC – "Christmas in Hollis"
- 1987: Various – Less than Zero (soundtrack)
- 1987: LL Cool J – "Jack the Ripper"
- 1988: Public Enemy – It Takes a Nation of Millions to Hold Us Back (exec.)
- 1988: Slayer – South of Heaven
- 1988: Danzig – Danzig
- 1988: Run-DMC – Tougher Than Leather
- 1988: Original Concept – Straight from the Basement of Kooley High! (exec.)
- 1989: Masters of Reality – Masters of Reality
- 1989: LL Cool J – Walking With a Panther
- 1989: Wolfsbane – Live Fast, Die Fast
- 1989: Andrew Dice Clay – Dice

== 1990s ==
- 1990: Andrew Dice Clay – The Day the Laughter Died
- 1990: Danzig – Danzig II: Lucifuge
- 1990: Slayer – Seasons in the Abyss
- 1990: Geto Boys – The Geto Boys (supervisor)
- 1990: Trouble – Trouble
- 1991: Red Hot Chili Peppers – Blood Sugar Sex Magik
- 1991: Slayer – Decade of Aggression
- 1991: Andrew Dice Clay – Dice Rules
- 1991: The Four Horsemen – Nobody Said It Was Easy
- 1992: Sir Mix-a-Lot – Mack Daddy (exec.)
- 1992: Trouble – Manic Frustration
- 1992: Danzig – Danzig III: How the Gods Kill (exec.)
- 1992: The Red Devils – King King
- 1992: Andrew Dice Clay – 40 Too Long
- 1992: Red Hot Chili Peppers – What Hits!?
- 1993: Flipper – American Grafishy (exec.)
- 1993: Mick Jagger – Wandering Spirit
- 1993: Raging Slab – Dynamite Monster Boogie Concert (exec.)
- 1993: The Cult – The Witch (CD, Single)
- 1993: Danzig – Thrall-Demonsweatlive
- 1993: Joan Jett and the Blackhearts – Flashback
- 1993: Tom Petty and the Heartbreakers – Greatest Hits
- 1993: Messiah – 21st Century Jesus (exec.)
- 1993: Andrew Dice Clay – The Day the Laughter Died, Part II
- 1993: Digital Orgasm – Do It (exec.)
- 1993: Barkmarket – Gimmick (exec.)
- 1993: Various – Last Action Hero: Music From The Original Motion Picture
- 1994: Johnny Cash – American Recordings
- 1994: Sir Mix-a-Lot – Chief Boot Knocka (exec.)
- 1994: Slayer – Divine Intervention (exec.)
- 1994: Danzig – Danzig 4
- 1994: Tom Petty – Wildflowers
- 1994: Andrew Dice Clay – Dice Live at Madison Square Garden
- 1994: Deconstruction – Deconstruction (exec.)
- 1994: Milk – Never Dated (exec.)
- 1994: Lords of Acid – Voodoo-U (exec.)
- 1994: Red Hot Chili Peppers – Live Rare Remix Box
- 1994: Red Hot Chili Peppers – The Plasma Shaft
- 1995: God Lives Underwater – God Lives Underwater (exec.)
- 1995: Nine Inch Nails – Further Down the Spiral
- 1995: Red Hot Chili Peppers – One Hot Minute
- 1995: AC/DC – Ballbreaker
- 1995: God Lives Underwater – Empty (exec.)
- 1995: Jazz Lee Alston – Jazz Lee Alston (exec.)
- 1996: Slayer – Undisputed Attitude (exec.)
- 1996: Tom Petty and the Heartbreakers – She's the One
- 1996: Sir Mix-a-Lot – Return of the Bumpasaurus (exec.)
- 1996: Donovan – Sutras
- 1996: LL Cool J – All World: Greatest Hits
- 1996: Johnny Cash – Unchained
- 1996: Barkmarket – L. Ron (exec.)
- 1996: Raging Slab – Sing Monkey Sing (exec.)
- 1996: Kwest tha Madd Ladd – This Is My First Album (exec.)
- 1997: System of a Down - Demo Tape 3
- 1997: Various – Private Parts: The Album
- 1998: Slayer – Diabolus in Musica
- 1998: Johnny Cash & Willie Nelson – VH1 Storytellers
- 1998: System of a Down – System of a Down
- 1998: Various – Chef Aid: The South Park Album
- 1998: Sheryl Crow – The Globe Sessions
- 1999: Kula Shaker – Peasants, Pigs & Astronauts
- 1999: Tom Petty and the Heartbreakers – Echo
- 1999: Red Hot Chili Peppers – Californication
- 1999: Various – Loud Rocks
- 1999: Melanie C – Northern Star
- 1999: Mr. Hankey Poo – Mr. Hankey The Christmas Poo
- 1999: Various – Mr. Hankey's Christmas Classics (exec.)

== 2000s ==
- 2000: Johnny Cash – American III: Solitary Man
- 2000: Rage Against the Machine – Renegades
- 2000: Eagle-Eye Cherry – Living in the Present Future
- 2000: Paloalto – Paloalto
- 2001: Saul Williams – Amethyst Rock Star
- 2001: American Head Charge – The War of Art
- 2001: System of a Down – Toxicity
- 2001: Slayer – God Hates Us All (exec.)
- 2001: Macy Gray – The Id (exec.)
- 2001: Nusrat Fateh Ali Khan – The Final Studio Recordings
- 2001: Krishna Das – Breath of the Heart
- 2002: Aerosmith – O, Yeah! Ultimate Aerosmith Hits
- 2002: Red Hot Chili Peppers – By the Way
- 2002: Johnny Cash – American IV: The Man Comes Around
- 2002: Audioslave – Audioslave
- 2002: System of a Down – Steal This Album!
- 2002: Rahat Nusrat Fateh Ali Khan – Rahat
- 2003: The Jayhawks – Rainy Day Music (exec.)
- 2003: The Mars Volta – De-Loused in the Comatorium
- 2003: Limp Bizkit – Results May Vary
- 2003: To My Surprise – To My Surprise (exec.)
- 2003: Joe Strummer & The Mescaleros – Streetcore
- 2003: Jay-Z – "99 Problems"
- 2003: Rage Against the Machine – Live at the Grand Olympic Auditorium
- 2003: Johnny Cash – Unearthed
- 2003: Paloalto – Heroes and Villains
- 2003: Krishna Das – Door of Faith
- 2003: Manmade God – Manmade God (exec.)
- 2004: Johnny Cash – My Mother's Hymn Book
- 2004: Slipknot – Vol. 3: (The Subliminal Verses)
- 2004: The (International) Noise Conspiracy – Armed Love
- 2004: Lil Jon & the East Side Boyz – Crunk Juice
- 2004: T.H. White – More Than Before (keys)
- 2005: Weezer – Make Believe
- 2005: System of a Down – Mezmerize
- 2005: Audioslave – Out of Exile
- 2005: Shakira – Fijación Oral, Vol. 1 (exec.)
- 2005: Limp Bizkit – Greatest Hitz
- 2005: Neil Diamond – 12 Songs
- 2005: Johnny Cash -The Legend of Johnny Cash
- 2005: System of a Down – Hypnotize
- 2005: Shakira – Oral Fixation, Vol. 2 (exec.)
- 2006: Red Hot Chili Peppers – Stadium Arcadium
- 2006: Dixie Chicks – Taking the Long Way
- 2006: Johnny Cash – American V: A Hundred Highways
- 2006: Slayer – Christ Illusion (exec.)
- 2006: Justin Timberlake – FutureSex/LoveSounds
- 2006: God Dethroned – The Toxic Touch
- 2006: U2 – U218 Singles
- 2006: Johnny Cash – The Legend of Johnny Cash Vol. II
- 2007: Linkin Park – Minutes to Midnight
- 2007: Poison – Poison'd!
- 2007: Luna Halo – Luna Halo (exec.)
- 2007: Gossip – Live in Liverpool (exec.)
- 2007: Dan Wilson – Free Life (exec.)
- 2007: Kanye West, Nas, KRS-One, Rakim – "Classic (Better Than I've Ever Been)"
- 2007: Coheed and Cambria - "Good Apollo, I'm Burning Star IV, Volume Two: No World for Tomorrow"
- 2008: Ours – Dancing for the Death of an Imaginary Enemy
- 2008: Neil Diamond – Home Before Dark
- 2008: Weezer – Weezer (Red Album)
- 2008: Jakob Dylan – Seeing Things
- 2008: Metallica – Death Magnetic
- 2008: The (International) Noise Conspiracy – The Cross of My Calling
- 2009: Gossip – Music for Men
- 2009: Pete Yorn – Back & Fourth (exec.)
- 2009: The Avett Brothers – I and Love and You
- 2009: Brandi Carlile – Give Up the Ghost
- 2009: Slayer – World Painted Blood (exec.)
- 2009: Type O Negative – Bloody Kisses "Top Shelf" edition (2009 re-release) "Summer Breeze" (Rick Rubin Mix)

== 2010s ==
- 2010: Johnny Cash – American VI: Ain't No Grave
- 2010: Gogol Bordello – Trans-Continental Hustle
- 2010: Linkin Park – A Thousand Suns
- 2010: Josh Groban – Illuminations
- 2010: Kid Rock – Born Free
- 2011: Adele – 21
- 2011: Red Hot Chili Peppers – I'm with You
- 2011: Metallica – Beyond Magnetic
- 2011: Linkin Park – A Thousand Suns+
- 2012: Linkin Park – Living Things
- 2012: Howlin' Rain – The Russian Wilds (exec.)
- 2012: ZZ Top – La Futura
- 2012: The Avett Brothers – The Carpenter
- 2012: Lana Del Rey – Paradise
- 2012: Red Hot Chili Peppers – Rock & Roll Hall of Fame Covers EP
- 2013: Linkin Park – Living Things +
- 2013: Black Sabbath – 13
- 2013: Kanye West – Yeezus (exec.)
- 2013: Eminem – The Marshall Mathers LP 2 (exec.)
- 2013: Jake Bugg – Shangri La
- 2013: Linkin Park – Recharged
- 2013: Lady Gaga – Artpop
- 2013: The Avett Brothers – Magpie and the Dandelion
- 2013: Red Hot Chili Peppers – I'm Beside You
- 2014: Jennifer Nettles – That Girl
- 2014: Ed Sheeran – X
- 2014: Angus & Julia Stone – Angus & Julia Stone
- 2014: Damien Rice – My Favourite Faded Fantasy
- 2014: Linkin Park & Alec Puro – Mall
- 2014: Wu-Tang Clan – A Better Tomorrow
- 2014: Yusuf – Tell 'Em I'm Gone
- 2015: GoldLink – And After That, We Didn't Talk
- 2016: Kanye West – The Life of Pablo
- 2016: Various – Star Wars Headspace
- 2016: James Blake – The Colour in Anything
- 2016: The Avett Brothers – True Sadness
- 2017: Billy Corgan – Ogilala
- 2017: Jovanotti – Oh, vita!
- 2017: Eminem – Revival
- 2018: Ruen Brothers – All My Shades of Blue
- 2018: The Smashing Pumpkins – Shiny and Oh So Bright, Vol. 1 / LP: No Past. No Future. No Sun.
- 2019: Santana – Africa Speaks
- 2019: Jovanotti – Jova Beach Party
- 2019: Jovanotti – Lorenzo sulla Luna
- 2019: Kae Tempest – The Book of Traps and Lessons
- 2019: The Avett Brothers – Closer Than Together

== 2020s ==
- 2020: The Strokes – The New Abnormal
- 2021: Imagine Dragons – Mercury – Act 1
- 2021: Santana – "Peace Power", "America for Sale", "Mother Yes"
- 2022: Jovanotti – Il disco del sole
- 2022: Red Hot Chili Peppers – Unlimited Love
- 2022: Imagine Dragons – Mercury – Act 2
- 2022: Red Hot Chili Peppers – Return of the Dream Canteen
- 2022: Neil Young and Crazy Horse – World Record
- 2023: Kesha – Gag Order
- 2023: Lil Uzi Vert – Pink Tape
- 2023: Travis Scott – Utopia
- 2024: Gossip – Real Power
- 2024: Marcus King – Mood Swings
- 2024: Beabadoobee – This Is How Tomorrow Moves
- 2025: Tyler Childers – Snipe Hunter
- 2025: 8th Road Home – Greatest Hits Vol. 1
- 2026: Neil Diamond – Wild at Heart
- 2026: The Strokes – Reality Awaits
