= Palo Alto (disambiguation) =

Palo Alto is a city in the San Francisco Bay Area of the United States.

Palo Alto may also refer to:

== Places ==
=== United States ===
- Palo Alto Airport, Santa Clara County
- Palo Alto Unified School District
  - Palo Alto High School
- East Palo Alto, California, neighboring city to Palo Alto, California, United States
- Palo Alto County, Iowa, United States
- Palo Alto, Louisiana, an unincorporated community in Ascension Parish, Louisiana
- Palo Alto, Mississippi, United States
- Palo Alto, Pennsylvania, United States
- Palo Alto, Texas, United States
- Palo Alto, Virginia, an unincorporated community in Highland County, Virginia

=== Mexico ===
- Palo Alto, Aguascalientes, Mexico

=== Philippines ===
- Palo Alto, Calamba, Laguna, Philippines

== Media ==
- Palo Alto (2007 film)
- Palo Alto (2013 film)
- Palo Alto (short story collection), a 2010 book of short stories by James Franco
- Palo Alto, a 2023 book by journalist Malcolm Harris
- Palo Alto Records, founded in 1981
- "Palo Alto", a Radiohead song from the EP Airbag / How Am I Driving?
- "Palo Alto", a 2016 song by Jack River
- Paloalto (band), a Californian rock band
  - Paloalto (album), their debut album
- Paloalto (rapper) (born Jeon Sang-hyun), a South Korean rapper and singer
- Palo Alto Daily News, local free newspaper
- Palo Alto, a 2020 jazz album by the Thelonious Monk Quartet, recorded at Palo Alto High School in 1968

== Businesses ==
- Palo Alto Research Center, formerly Xerox PARC
- Palo Alto Internet Exchange (PAIX)
- Palo Alto Networks, network security company based in Santa Clara, California.

== Other ==
- El Palo Alto, a redwood tree in Palo Alto, California, and the city's namesake
- SS Palo Alto, a concrete ship
- Battle of Palo Alto, during the Mexican–American War

== See also ==
- Palo Alto Plantation (disambiguation)
