= Golden State (band) =

American indie rock band

- Origin: Los Angeles United States
- Genres: Indie rock
- Members: James Grundler; Marc Boggio; Elias Reidy; Kemble Walters
- Past members: Fern Sanchez; Robb Torres; Tommy Black; Noah Stone; Alex Parnell

Golden State is an indie rock band from Los Angeles, California. Band members include former Paloalto vocalist James Grundler (vocals/guitar), Marc Boggio (guitar), Kemble Walters (drums), and Elias Reidy (bass), formerly of The Red Jumpsuit Apparatus.

== Biography ==
Vocalist James Grundler is known for heading Los Angeles-based band Paloalto. Paloalto's two studio albums were produced by Rick Rubin and released through American Recordings. James was also in San Luis Obispo, California-based band The Din Pedals.

Golden State has two singles that were featured on the Discovery Channel show Deadliest Catch: “All Roads Lead Home” and “Bombs.” “All Roads Lead Home” was also featured on episodes of the Canadian TV series Flashpoint, and Heartland as well as on the soundtrack for the movie Dolphin Tale.

"Save Me", from their debut album Division, has another version recorded and released separately that features Tyler Blackburn on vocals and is the theme song to webseries Wendy (starring Meaghan Martin).

Their song "Till the End" was used as the official theme for the BBC's coverage of the 2011 Royal Wedding of Prince William & Catherine Middleton.

The band's song "Bombs" was featured as the opening song of an episode of the TV series Gossip Girl.

Their song "Take Me Out" is featured in the trailer and soundtrack for the film Cavemen.

== Line-up ==
Current

- James Grundler – lead vocalist
- Marc Boggio – guitar
- Elias Reidy – bass guitar
- Kemble Walters – drums

Former

- Fern Sanchez – drums
- Kameron Waters – drums
- Robb Torres – guitar
- Tommy Black – bass guitar
- Noah Stone – guitar
- Alex Parnell – bass guitar
- Adam D'Zurilla – bass guitar

== Discography ==
=== Studio albums ===
| Title | Album details |
|---|---|
| Division | Released: July 19, 2011, May 7, 2013 (iTunes re-release); Label: State Champ Records; Formats: CD |
| Blood Finger Prick | Released: December 25, 2020; Label: State Champ Records; Formats: Digital |

=== EPs ===
| Title | Album details |
|---|---|
| Splinters Out | Released: 2005; Formats: CD |
| Golden Rule | Released: 2008; Formats: CD |
| Subdivision | Released: January 29, 2013; Label: State Champ Records; Formats: CD |
| The Rush E.P. | Released: July 25, 2013; Label: State Champ Records; Formats: CD |
| Body Snatchers E.P. | Released: March 25, 2019; Label: State Champ Records; Formats: Digital |

=== Singles ===
- "Destroyer" (March 11, 2011)
- "All Roads Lead Home" (July 19, 2011)
- "Bombs (End This War)" (May 11, 2012)
- "Rocket" (January 26, 2013)
- "Love Song" (feat. Holly Conlan) (January 27, 2013)
- "A Triumphant Return" (May 7, 2013)
- "Take Me Out" (January 5, 2014)
- "Take Me Home" (June 24, 2014)
- "Wolves" (July 15, 2014)
- "Head On" (February 8, 2015)
- "Gold" (June 10, 2015)
- "Race" (March 25, 2019)
- "Eyesore" (October 13, 2020)
