= Ameche =

Ameche is a surname. Notable people with the surname include:

- Alan Ameche (1933–1988), American football player
- Don Ameche (1908–1993), American actor and voice artist
- Jim Ameche (1915–1983), American radio actors
- Steven Ameche, American lawyer

== See also ==
- Ameche's Drive-in, fast-food restaurant chain based in Baltimore, Maryland
