= Dice Rules =

Live album by Andrew Dice Clay
- Released: 1991
- Recorded: February 21–22, 1990 and October 25, 1990
- Venues: Madison Square Garden (tracks 1–20); Rascals Comedy Club, New Jersey (tracks 21–39)
- Genre: Comedy
- Length: 54:37
- Labels: Def American; Warner Bros.

Andrew Dice Clay chronology
The Day the Laughter Died (1990)	Dice Rules (1991)	40 Too Long (1992)

Dice Rules is a comedy double album by American comedian Andrew Dice Clay, released in 1991. It was released on record producer Rick Rubin's record label Def American and subsequently re-issued on Warner Bros. Records.

== Synopsis ==
The first side (tracks 1–20) was recorded at Madison Square Garden with the second side (tracks 21–39) being recorded in a smaller, more intimate club setting (Rascals Comedy Club in New Jersey). The closing track, "Brooklyn Bad Boy", is an original song by Clay which was also heard during the end credits of the Dice Rules film.

== Film adaptation ==
Dice's engagement at Madison Square Garden was filmed for the film of the same name, which came out in May 1991, which received mostly negative reviews from critics and was nominated for three Razzie Awards including Worst Picture, Worst Actor (Andrew Dice Clay) and Worst Screenplay. The film holds a 7% rating on Rotten Tomatoes based on reviews from fourteen critics.

== Track listing ==
1. "Intro"
2. "How Are Ya?"
3. "Birds"
4. "Phone Sex"
5. "Ya Can't Be Nice to Them"
6. "Christmas Presents"
7. "Hoidy Toidy Chicks"
8. "Opportunity in America (Al Capone's Safe)"
9. "Japs"
10. "Handicaps & Cripples"
11. "Don't Move"
12. "Double Parking"
13. "The Car Ride (Goin' to a Party)"
14. "The Driveway"
15. "Subway Travel"
16. "The Grocery Store"
17. "Industrial Size"
18. "The Urinal"
19. "1989-A Review"
20. "Bad Press"
21. "Backwards"
22. "Shakin' Hands"
23. "Chicks Aren't Funny (Joey Will)"
24. "Bambi"
25. "3 Beautiful Dates"
26. "Action"
27. "Debbie Duz Everything"
28. "Filthy in Bed"
29. "Salt & Pepper"
30. "Smokin' for Your Health"
31. "The News"
32. "Fat Orgasms"
33. "Black Chicks"
34. "A Vibrant Beautiful Woman"
35. "Woman's World"
36. "The First Blow-Job"
37. "People Are Pricks"
38. "Ya Hear?"
39. "Apartment Life"
40. "Brooklyn Bad Boy"
