= Invaders from Mars (1953 film) =

1953 film by William Cameron Menzies

- Theatrical release poster
- Directed by: William Cameron Menzies
- Screenplay by: Richard Blake
- Story by: John Tucker Battle
- Produced by: Edward L. Alperson Jr. Edward L. Alperson
- Starring: Helena Carter; Arthur Franz; Jimmy Hunt
- Cinematography: John F. Seitz
- Edited by: Arthur Roberts
- Music by: Raoul Kraushaar
- Production company: National Pictures Corp.
- Distributed by: 20th Century-Fox
- Release dates: April 9, 1953 (Detroit); April 22, 1953 (United States)
- Running time: 80 minutes
- Country: United States
- Language: English
- Budget: $290,000

Invaders from Mars is a 1953 American science fiction horror film directed by William Cameron Menzies and starring Helena Carter, Arthur Franz and Jimmy Hunt. It was produced by Edward L. Alperson Jr. and released by 20th Century-Fox in SuperCinecolor.

The film follows David MacLean, a young boy who witnesses a flying saucer landing behind his home one night. When his father investigates, he returns a changed man; soon David's mother, his neighbors, and others begin to act in the same way. David's panicked story is heard by Dr. Pat Blake, who takes him to astronomer Dr. Stuart Kelston. David convinces Kelston that this is an invading vanguard from Mars.

Invaders from Mars recounts its story from the point of view of an older child in an adult world heading into crisis. It was developed from a scenario by Richard Blake and based on a story treatment by John Tucker Battle, who was inspired by a dream recounted to him by his wife. The film was rushed into production to be released before George Pal's War of the Worlds (also released in 1953), becoming the first feature film to show aliens and their spacecraft in color.

The film developed a cult following in the years following its initial release, and was championed by directors like Steven Spielberg, Martin Scorsese, and Joe Dante as a childhood favorite. A remake film was released in 1986, directed by Tobe Hooper. In 2024, the film was selected for preservation in the United States National Film Registry by the Library of Congress as being "culturally, historically, or aesthetically significant".

== Plot ==
Late one night, David MacLean, a young boy, is awakened by a loud thunderstorm. From his bedroom window, he sees a flying saucer descend and disappear into the sandpit area behind his home. He tells his scientist father George, who goes to investigate. David's mother Mary later looks for him there, but he is gone. When George returns in the morning, David notices an unusual puncture on the back of his father's neck; George is now behaving in a cold and hostile manner, and repeatedly warns David to tell no one about the saucer sighting. The police officers Mary summoned to find George are acting in the same way and say they will not report the incident since George has returned. Through his telescope, David sees child neighbor Kathy Wilson disappear underground while walking in the sandpit. When she returns, Kathy burns her family's house down.

David realizes his father and the others are being controlled by the alien visitors, and runs to the police station for help. The police chief, who also has a puncture on his neck, has David locked in a cell. Concerned by David's distraught manner, the desk officer summons health-department physician Dr. Pat Blake to calm him. Blake instead comes to believe David's story after she confirms several details, such as the police's neglecting to report George's disappearance.

Invaders from Mars trailer (2:14)

David and Dr. Blake consult local astronomer Dr. Stuart Kelston, who says that the flying saucer is likely the vanguard of an invasion from the planet Mars, now in close orbital proximity to Earth. He also has an educated guess at the Martians' motive: both George MacLean and Kathy's father are working at the nearby government research plant on a prototype atomic rocket, which could inadvertently threaten Martian life. Kelston contacts the U.S. Army and convinces them to investigate. The Pentagon assembles troops and tanks under the command of Colonel Fielding. The army traces signals transmitted to their mind-control victims leading back to the sandpit, and the army surrounds the saucer landing site.

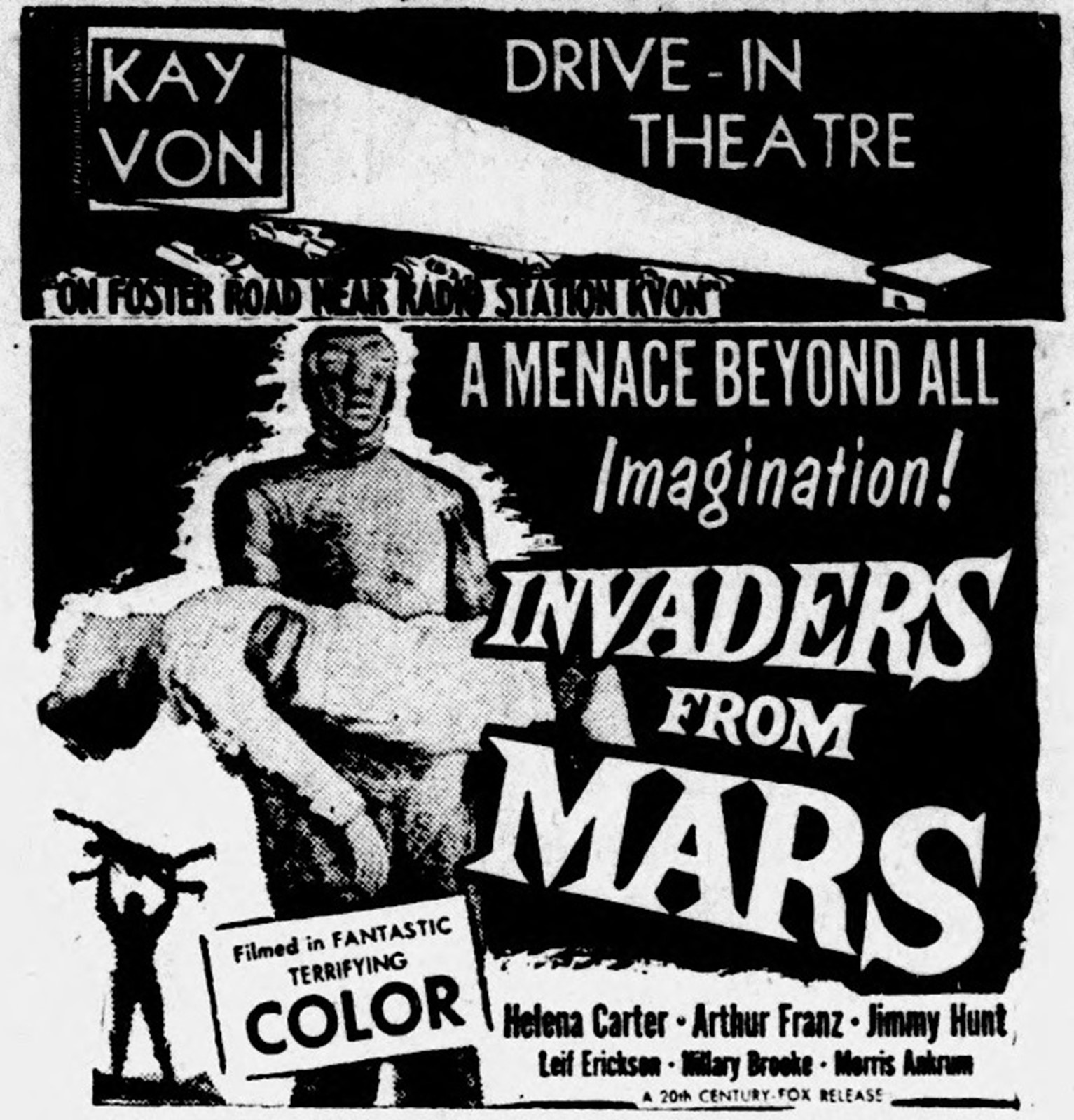
Drive-in advertisement from 1953.

During the army search, Dr. Blake and David are sucked underground by tall, slit-eyed green humanoids and taken via tunnels to the flying saucer. Army troops locate and blow open an entrance to the tunnels. Colonel Fielding and a small detachment make their way to the saucer entrance. Inside, they confront the Martian supreme intelligence. Under his mental commands, the tall, green, silent, synthetic mutants have implanted mind-control crystals at the base of the skull of their victims; if they are caught, the mind control devices explode, causing a fatal cerebral hemorrhage. The troops and Colonel Fielding, with Dr. Blake and David in tow, open fire on the pursuing mutants as their group escapes the saucer. After a running battle in the tunnels, Fielding's troops plant timed explosive charges aboard the saucer. They then race to evacuate, using one of the Martian's excavation tools to open a tunnel to the surface. David runs downhill away from the sandpit, and his mind is flooded with images of the Martian invasion, including events that he did not witness.

Following the explosion of the saucer, David is back in his bed on the night of the storm. He runs into his parents' bedroom, confused and frightened; they reassure him that he was just having a dream. He returns to his bed, where he again witnesses the flying saucer from his nightmare descend into the sandpit.

== Cast ==
- Helena Carter as Dr. Pat Blake
- Arthur Franz as Dr. Stuart Kelston / Narrator
- Jimmy Hunt as David MacLean
- Leif Erickson as Mr. George MacLean
- Hillary Brooke as Mrs. Mary MacLean
- Morris Ankrum as Col. Fielding
- Max Wagner as Sgt. Rinaldi
- William Edward Phipps as Sgt. Baker(as Bill Phipps)
- Milburn Stone as Capt. Roth
- Janine Perreau as Kathy Wilson

== Production ==
=== Casting ===
Dr. Pat Blake was the first (and only) character Helena Carter played that was not a male lead's love interest. She retired from acting after this film was completed.

=== Music ===
The production makes use of a unique outre music score that consists of an ethereal, rhythmically wavering tonal composition sung in unison by a choir. It is used as both a sound effect and as the scenic score associated with the Martians. The score is credited to Raoul Kraushaar, but Thomas Hischak's Encyclopedia of Film Composers notes that most of the score is now believed to be the work of frequent Republic composer Mort Glickman.

=== Visual design ===
An Eastmancolor camera negative was used for principal photography, with SuperCinecolor prints struck for the initial theatrical release to provide an oddly striking and vivid look to the film's images; standard Eastmancolor prints were used thereafter on later releases. While some film sources have claimed that Invaders was designed for the early 3D process (it was already in production before the breakthrough 3D film, Bwana Devil, was released), it was not filmed or released in 3D.

Despite being a quickly shot, low-budget 1950s feature, Invaders uses occasional camera angles set lower or higher than usual to enhance the dramatic and visual impact of key scenes. Some of Menzies' set designs (such as those in the police station, the observatory, and the interiors of the Martian flying saucer) consist of elongated structures with stark, unadorned walls, sometimes much taller than necessary, adding touches of dreamlike surrealism.

=== Special effects ===
The Martian heat-ray effect showing the bubbling, melting walls of the tunnels was created by shooting a large tub of boiling oatmeal from above, colored red with food coloring and lit with red lights. The cooled, bubbled-up effect on some areas of the blasted tunnel walls was created by first using inflated balloons pinned to the tunnel walls. In film tests they looked like balloons stuck to the walls, so the effects crew tried smaller inflated latex condoms. Further testing showed these looked much more convincing, and the crew wound up inflating more than 3,000 and then sticking them to portions of the tunnel set's walls; in some shots, the condoms can be seen moving slightly as the Martian mutants rush down the tunnels.

The film was shot at Republic Pictures in the conventional (pre-CinemaScope) 1.37:1 screen aspect ratio, thereby facilitating recycling shots simply by flipping the film negative left to right (or right to left) in an optical printer, as "full aperture" is symmetric about the film's axis. These effects shots in Invaders are apparent. For example, during the car chase scenes, where cars are first seen turning one way and, several cuts later, the very same cars are seen turning the opposite direction (with identical, but reversed background). "Full aperture" also facilitated shooting the sandpit scenes (sand "falling down" or sand "falling up") without resorting to an optical printer stepping backwards. This was done by the simple expedient of shooting the "falling down" scenes conventionally, but shooting the "falling up" scenes with the camera upside-down, rotated about the optical axis of the lens, and then reversing that shot end-for-end during "negative assembly", making the sand appear to be moving upwards. SuperCinecolor required an optical printer to extract the "separations". This was necessary for its three-color process: red/"cyan printer" and green/"magenta printer" printed on opposite sides of the film print, and blue/"yellow printer" printed over one of those sides, with one side having two colors, and the other side having one color. This was unlike "three-strip" Technicolor, where all three colors were printed on one side of the film stock. A side effect of this process flow is that Invaders was composited as if it were a "three-strip" Technicolor feature.

== British release ==
In 1954 the film was released in the UK. The British film distributor complained the film was not long enough and the dream narrative was not satisfactory. The producer therefore shot additional new footage to lengthen the observatory sequence, and the dream narrative was changed. A new ending and additional scenes were quickly shot in answer to the distributor's objections. Other portions of Invaders were also re-edited, while the "was-it-all-just-a-nightmare?" U.S. ending was replaced with a more straightforward conclusion. All new scenes were filmed several months after the U.S. release, including the one showing the destruction of the Martian flying saucer in the sky when the army's explosive charges finally detonate. The British release print includes a greatly expanded planetarium office scene: framed pictures can be seen hanging on the set's walls that were not in the U.S. release; they appear to vanish and then reappear at times as the expanded and reedited scenes play out. While the adult actors had not changed significantly, child actor Jimmy Hunt is taller, looks older, and has shorter hair in these added scenes. Hunt also wears a sweater vest in them (the vest materializes about three minutes into the scene, at which time Dr. Kelston's necktie also appears to be retied), while he and Dr. Kelston discuss various flying saucer accounts: the Lubbock Lights and the Mantell UFO incident; Dr. Kelston also identifies the various saucer models as "Type 1", "Type 2", etc.

== Home media ==
The film was released on Blu-ray by Ignite Films with a 4k restoration retaining the original look after years of drearier DVD releases alongside two trailers, the two restored segments (the Alternate International ending and extended Planetarium scene), John Sayles's introduction of the film at the 2022 Turner Classic Movies Film Festival and a featurette, produced and directed by award-winning filmmaker Jeremy Alter, featuring John Landis and Joe Dante.

== Reception ==
Oscar Godbout of The New York Times reviewed the film strictly as entertainment for youngsters, calling it "a pictorial 'funnybook'" that would "probably frighten witless a lot of small children". A generally positive review in Variety wrote: "Imaginative yarn makes full use of astronomical and lab equipment as well as Government atomic research installations as backgrounds to heighten the realism. Highlight, however, is a Martian ray gun which can cause the earth to part into subterranean passages. All this has been effectively filmed by John Seitz in Cinecolor". Harrison's Reports declared it "A pretty good science-fiction melodrama, photographed in Cinecolor. The story, as in most pictures of this type, is highly imaginative, but it is packed with suspense from start to finish and should thrill the action fans, especially the youngsters".

The Southern California Motion Picture Council cautioned "The tale is weird and terrifying, but well-done with ... exceptional color. ... the audience is almost frozen with fear until the finale is reached. This is entirely too terrifying and realistic a picture for children".

At the film review aggregator website Rotten Tomatoes, the film holds an approval rating of 88% based on 16 reviews. Film historian Paul Meehan considered Invaders from Mars as "one of the best of the 50s invasion cycle", and "in hindsight", one of the most influential of the period, setting the scene for other "abduction films".

Author and film critic Leonard Maltin awarded the film three out of a possible four stars. In his film review, Maltin called it "starkly stylish".

== Legacy ==
Invaders from Mars impressed some kids who grew up and became filmmakers. In a booklet accompanying the film's restoration, Steven Spielberg recalled watching the film five times in the theatre as a child. "It really turned my world around. It certainly touched a nerve in all the kids like myself who saw the film at a very young age," he said. Joe Dante and John Landis both cited it as an influence. Martin Scorsese named it on a list of the 10 best films to use light and color.

Don Coscarelli's original 1979 Phantasm has some plot similarities, while Brad Bird's The Iron Giant makes references to the film, as well as to other iconic science fiction features, particularly those from the 1950s. It has been suggested that the film may have provided inspiration for the Barney and Betty Hill UFO abduction claims.

In 2024, the film was selected for preservation in the United States National Film Registry by the Library of Congress as being "culturally, historically, or aesthetically significant".

== Adaptations ==
=== Remake ===
A 1986 remake film was produced using the same title. The remake was directed by Tobe Hooper and stars Karen Black, Hunter Carson, and Timothy Bottoms. The original film's child star Jimmy Hunt played the police chief.

=== Comic book ===
A three-issue Invaders from Mars comic book adaptation, written by Steven Philip Jones and drawn by Sandy Carruthers, was published by Eternity Comics in 1990. Eternity published an original three-issue sequel by Jones and Carruthers in 1991.

== In popular culture ==
The film was spoofed by RiffTrax, consisting of former Mystery Science Theater 3000 alumni Kevin Murphy, Bill Corbett and Michael J. Nelson, on March 26, 2021.

The song "Kathy Wilson", from the mini-album All Hell's Breaking Loose Down at Little Kathy Wilson's Place by English heavy metal band Wolfsbane, was inspired by the film.

== See also ==
- List of films featuring extraterrestrials
- Mars in fiction
