= Face down ass up =

Face down ass up may refer to:

- Doggy style
- Face Down, Ass Up, a 2000 album by Andrew Dice Clay
- A song on the album Banned in the U.S.A. by 2 Live Crew
