= The Day the Laughter Died, Part II =

1993 live album by Andrew Dice Clay

Live album by Andrew Dice Clay
- Released: November 16, 1993
- Recorded: July 14–16, 1993
- Venue: Dangerfield's, New York City
- Genre: Comedy
- Length: 69:35
- Label: American Recordings
- Producer: Rick Rubin

Andrew Dice Clay chronology
40 Too Long (1992)	The Day the Laughter Died, Part II (1993)	Filth (1998)

The Day the Laughter Died, Part II is a 1993 live comedy album by American comedian Andrew Dice Clay, produced by Rick Rubin. A sequel to 1990's The Day the Laughter Died, the album repeated the original's concept: an unadvertised performance at Rodney Dangerfield's club, Dangerfield's.

Unlike the first album, which received positive reviews and ended on a high note, Part II received mostly negative reviews and ended with Clay going into the crowd to confront an audience member. That incident, and the album in general, nearly destroyed Clay's career.

== Track listing ==
1. "'Tis the Season" – 0:23
2. "Thermometers" – 0:14
3. "Gas (Feminine)" – 3:07
4. "Deef & Dumb" – 1:34
5. "The Notes" – 0:48
6. "Sound" – 1:29
7. "The Wedding" – 4:04
8. "Critics" – 3:22
9. "Pink Dot" – 1:54
10. "My First Concert" – 2:09
11. "Chinese" – 0:17
12. "More Notes" – 2:06
13. "Dr. Dice" – 0:20
14. "Rice" – 1:19
15. "Film & Video" – 1:46
16. "Bachelorette Party" – 4:15
17. "Tom & The Philippino" – 2:58
18. "Wife Tells All" – 1:54
19. "Surprise" – 3:52
20. "Games" – 1:05
21. "Talk to 'Em" – 0:32
22. "Chinks" – 2:47
23. "Mad Max" – 3:15
24. "Sealed With a Kiss" – 1:48
25. "The Contractor" – 2:20
26. "Songs" – 7:48
27. "Chinese Restaurant" – 1:50
28. "Greeting Cards" – 1:47
29. "No Poems" – 3:00
30. "The Argument" – 5:32
