= Lifestyles of the Broke and Obscure =

Compilation album by Wolfsbane
- Released: 10 July 2001
- Genre: Heavy metal
- Length: 106:22
- Label: Sanctuary
- Producer: Simon Efemey & Wolfsbane

Wolfsbane chronology
Wolfsbane (1994)	Lifestyles of the Broke and Obscure (2001)	Did It for the Money (2011)

Professional ratings
Review scores
Source	Rating
Allmusic	3/5 stars
Kerrang!	4/5 stars

Lifestyles of the Broke and Obscure is a compilation album by the band Wolfsbane consisting of the albums Wolfsbane (CD1) and Massive Noise Injection (CD2).

== Track listing ==
Disc One: Wolfsbane

1. "Wings" - 4.21
2. "Lifestyles of the Broke and Obscure" - 3.47
3. "My Face" - 3.26
4. "Money Talks" - 4.25
5. "Seen How It's Done" - 4.36
6. "Beautiful Lies" - 3.36
7. "Protect and Survive" - 3.24
8. "Black Machine" - 3.13
9. "Violence" - 3.41
10. "Die Again" - 13.23 (includes "hidden" track "Say Goodbye")

Disc Two: Massive Noise Injection

1. "Protect and Survive" - 3:47
2. "Load Me Down" - 3:02
3. "Black Lagoon" - 4:54
4. "Rope and Ride" - 4:08
5. "Kathy Wilson" - 4:21
6. "Loco" - 3:33
7. "End of the Century" - 4:10
8. "Steel" - 4:56
9. "Temple of Rock" - 5:37
10. "Manhunt" - 3:56
11. "Money to Burn" - 6:56
12. "Paint the Town Red" - 3:48
13. "Wild Thing" - 5:31

== Personnel ==
- Blaze Bayley: Vocals
- Jason Edwards: Guitar
- Jeff Hately: Bass
- Steve "Danger" Ellet: Drums
