= Wolfsbane Save the World =

Studio album by Wolfsbane
- Released: 9 January 2012
- Recorded: 2011
- Studio: Majestic Splendour Studio
- Genre: Heavy metal, hard rock
- Length: 46:38
- Producer: Jason Edwards

Wolfsbane chronology
Did It for the Money (2011)	Wolfsbane Save the World (2012)	Genius (2022)

Professional ratings
Review scores
Source	Rating
BW&BK	8.5/10
Classic Rock	8/10 stars
Record Collector	3/5 stars

Wolfsbane Save the World is the fourth studio album by the British heavy metal band Wolfsbane, released in 2012. This was the first album of new material by Wolfsbane since their self-titled album in 1994, although they did record one new song for their 2011 EP Did It for the Money. The album was available on the band's official website, as well as via the merchandise stand on the band's then-upcoming tour.

== Track listing ==
No.	Title	Length
1.	"Blue Sky"	5:10
2.	"Teacher"	4:05
3.	"Buy My Pain"	3:47
4.	"Starlight"	4:00
5.	"Smoke and Red Light"	3:44
6.	"Illusion of Love"	6:03
7.	"Live Before I Die"	5:09
8.	"Who Are You Now"	3:21
9.	"Everybody's Looking for Something Baby"	4:06
10.	"Child of the Sun"	3:39
11.	"Did It for the Money"	3:34

== Personnel ==
=== Wolfsbane ===
- Blaze Bayley – vocals
- Jason Edwards – guitar, producer, engineer
- Jeff Hateley – bass
- Steve "Danger" Ellett – drums

=== Additional musicians ===
- Givvi Flynn – vocals on track 6, backing vocals on track 8
- Chris Catalyst – additional vocals on track 6
- Glen Buglass – backing vocals on track 4
