= Judy Toll =

American actress (1958–2002)

- Born: Judith Amy Toll; January 14, 1958; Philadelphia, Pennsylvania, U.S.
- Died: May 2, 2002 (aged 44); Santa Monica, California, U.S.
- Occupations: Actress; comedian; producer; writer
- Years active: 1987–2002
- Spouse: Richard Trank (m. 2001)
- Relatives: Josh Trank (stepson)

Judith Amy Toll (January 14, 1958 – May 2, 2002) was an American comedian, writer, and actress.

== Career ==
Born in Philadelphia, Pennsylvania, Toll wrote for television programs including Sex and the City, Boy Meets World, Alright Already, and The Geena Davis Show. A Groundling trained in sketch and improv comedy, she started in the local comedy clubs of Philadelphia, such as The Jail House in West Philadelphia and The Comedy Factory Outlet in Old City. She also acted in several TV shows including Curb Your Enthusiasm and Red Shoe Diaries. She was also known for her portrayal of "Andrea Dice Clay", a parody of shock comedian Andrew Dice Clay. She co-wrote the film Casual Sex? with fellow Groundling Wendy Goldman. The film was based on a play they wrote at The Groundlings. Sex and the City episode "Cover Girl" (Season 5, episode 4) has been dedicated to Judy Toll, as well as the pilot episode of Less than Perfect. A streaming audiobook with material she performed at Un-Cabaret, Judy Toll: Shareaholic is available.

== Discography ==
- The Dice Woman "Lips Only" (PolyGram, 1991) VHS/broadcast
- The Funniest Woman You've Never Heard Of (Judecat, 2010) DVD/streaming
- Shareaholic (Comedy Dynamics, 2015) CD/streaming

=== Appearances ===
- Un-Cabaret: Freak Weather Feels Different (BG Records, 1995) Tracks 5 & 28, CD/streaming
- The Good, the Bad, and the Drugly (Comedy Dynamics, 2015) Track 12, CD/streaming

== Death ==
Toll died in 2002 of melanoma. Her life was the subject of a 2007 documentary, Judy Toll: The Funniest Woman You've Never Heard Of, produced by her brother, Gary Toll.
