= Filth (Andrew Dice Clay album) =

Live album by Andrew Dice Clay
- Released: 1998
- Genre: Comedy
- Length: 2:47:58
- Label: MFA
- Producer: Robb Cullen; Andrew Dice Clay

Andrew Dice Clay chronology
The Day the Laughter Died, Part II (1993)	Filth (1998)	Face Down, Ass Up (2000)

Filth is a comedy album by American comedian Andrew Dice Clay. It was originally released as a double album exclusively via the Internet in 1998, with only 20,000 copies produced.

A bonus third album of Filth, entitled Even More Filth, was included exclusively for pre-orders of the initial release.

== Track listing ==
Disc 1

1. Cliff McGiver
2. Muffet Blews
3. Mancow
4. I Love My Fans
5. Joey Big Head
6. Midget Mania
7. Ball Bag Mania
8. Bun Pig
9. My Cum
10. Flat Fat Mania
11. Bongo Pussy
12. Ladies' Man
13. Hobbies, Golf & Twat
14. Crowd Pig
15. Rag Fun
16. Olympic Mania
17. Dice Revues Little House
18. My Kind of Girl
19. The Best Is Yet to Come

Disc 2: More Filth

1. He Said, She Said
2. Dice on Smoking
3. Chink Mania
4. Crowd Banter
5. Older, Younger
6. Money Management
7. Clinton Rules
8. Monicunt
9. Monicunt's Fatter Friend
10. Camel Jockey Mania
11. Greeting Cards
12. Wackbag House Remix
13. Bird Mania
14. Florida Mania
15. More Crowd Banter
16. The Receptionist
17. Stone Cunt
18. Mother's Advice
19. Yet, More Crowd Banter
20. Dice on Comedy
21. Cheating & Hookers
22. Margot Mania
23. Walters Mania
24. Old Buddy

Disc 3: Even More Filth

1. Family Man
2. Little House Unplugged
3. Chucky
4. Extra President Stuff
5. Coffee Mania
6. Computer Nerd
7. Filthy
8. Dirty, Filthy, Nasty
9. Jim Norton
10. More Jim Norton
11. It's Just Sooooo Dirty
12. Bound, Tied & Fucked
13. Dice in Vegas
