= Dice (album) =

Live album by Andrew Dice Clay
- Released: 1989
- Genre: Comedy
- Label: Def American
- Producer: Rick Rubin

Andrew Dice Clay chronology
Dice (1989)	The Day the Laughter Died (1990)

Professional ratings
Review scores
Source	Rating
AllMusic	2.5/5 stars
The Rolling Stone Album Guide	.5/5 stars

Dice is the debut comedy album by American comedian Andrew Dice Clay, released in 1989. It sold around 500,000 copies.

== Track listing ==
1. What If the Chick Gets Pregnant...
2. Mother Goose
3. A Day at the Beach
4. Moby and the Japs
5. Doctors and Nurses
6. Smokin'
7. The Attitude
8. No Pity
9. The Golden Age of Television
10. Speedin'
11. Couples in Love
12. When I Was Young
13. Shampoo
14. Joey
15. The Bait
16. Masturbation
17. Hoggin'
18. No Guilt

== Production ==
- Produced by Rick Rubin

== Certifications ==
Region	Certification	Certified units/sales
United States (RIAA)	Gold	500,000^{^}
^{^} Shipments figures based on certification alone.
