= Dice Rules (film) =

1991 comedy film

- Theatrical release poster
- Directed by: Jay Dubin
- Screenplay by: Andrew Dice Clay; Lenny Shulman
- Story by: Andrew Dice Clay
- Produced by: Fred Silverstein
- Starring: Andrew Dice Clay
- Cinematography: Michael Negrin
- Edited by: Mitchell Sinoway
- Music by: Music Out the Yang
- Production companies: New Line Cinema; Fleebin Dabble
- Distributed by: Seven Arts
- Release date: May 17, 1991
- Running time: 88 minutes
- Country: United States
- Language: English
- Box office: $637,327

Dice Rules is a 1991 American stand-up comedy film starring Andrew Dice Clay and directed by Jay Dubin. This was the first film to get an NC-17 for language alone.

== Plot ==
The film begins with a half-hour narrative short titled "A Day in the Life" with Andrew Dice Clay being abused by everyone he comes across until he purchases a studded leather jacket and becomes "The Diceman". After the short, the rest of the movie consists of footage from his shows at Madison Square Garden in New York City.

== Cast ==
- Andrew Dice Clay as Himself
- Eddie Griffin as Gas Station Attendant
- Sylvia Harman as Homeless Woman
- Lee Lawrence as Lee
- Noodles Levenstein as Bank Teller
- Maria Parkinson as Berneece Silverstein
- Michael Wheels Parise as Dr. Slaughter
- Sumont as Convenience Clerk
- Hot Tub Johnny West as Deli Clerk
- Fred Silverstein as Man in Love

== Production ==
Originally intended to be released by 20th Century Fox on August 31, 1990, in July of that year, Fox made the decision to indefinitely delay release of the then-unnamed Andrew Dice Clay Concert Film. Reportedly, executives at Fox were positioning Andrew Dice Clay as a leading man with projects such as The Adventures of Ford Fairlane seeking to distance Clay from his "Diceman" persona. Then-Fox distribution chief Tom Sherak iterated that Clay's two-night engagement at Madison Square Garden was filmed without any definite plans for a theatrical release, and emphasized the studio's opposition to issuing pictures rated NC-17. The cancelation of the film's theatrical release by Fox was praised by the National Organization for Women, a frequent critic group of Clay's material. Clay was reportedly angered by Fox's decision not to release his concert film, voicing his regret at associating with the studio. The film was eventually picked up for distribution through Carolco Pictures for release through the company's Seven Arts label shared with New Line Cinema. Alan Friedberg, then-chairman of Loews Theaters, refused to exhibit the film, citing Clay's material related to women, ethnic groups, homosexuals, and the disabled. Other theater chains soon followed suit including American Multi-Cinema, Famous Players and Edwards Theatres. Cineplex Odeon, National Amusements and United Artists Theaters agreed to showcase the film, but were considered more niche "Art House" syndicates.

== Reception ==
Dice Rules received negative reviews with an aggregate score of 7% on Rotten Tomatoes from 14 critics. Roger Ebert said of the film: "Andrew Dice Clay comes billed as a comedian, but does not get one laugh from me in the 87 minutes of this film". Ebert gave the film a rare zero-stars rating in his print review.

Ebert also reviewed the film with Gene Siskel on their series At the Movies, each giving it a thumbs down, though Siskel did note he laughed a grand total of 2 times during the movie, compared to Ebert who did not laugh at all during the film. Siskel put it on his list of the Ten Worst films of the year. The film was nominated for Worst Picture, Worst Actor (Clay) and Worst Screenplay (Clay and Lenny Shulman) at the 12th Golden Raspberry Awards.
