= Casual Sex? =

1988 film by Geneviève Robert

- Theatrical release poster
- Directed by: Geneviève Robert
- Written by: Wendy Goldman; Judy Toll
- Based on: Casual Sex by Wendy Goldman; Judy Toll; Alan Axelrod
- Produced by: Ilona Herzberg
- Starring: Lea Thompson; Victoria Jackson; Stephen Shellen; Jerry Levine; Mary Gross; Andrew Dice Clay
- Cinematography: Rolf Kestermann
- Edited by: Donn Cambern; Sheldon Kahn
- Music by: Van Dyke Parks
- Production company: Ivan Reitman Productions
- Distributed by: Universal Pictures
- Release date: April 22, 1988
- Running time: 88 minutes
- Country: United States
- Language: English
- Box office: $12.2 million

Casual Sex? is a 1988 American comedy film about two female friends in their 20s who go to a vacation resort in search of ideal men. It stars Lea Thompson, Victoria Jackson, Andrew Dice Clay, Jerry Levine, and Mary Gross. The film originated as a Groundlings musical-comedy sketch in 1985 by Wendy Goldman and Judy Toll. Ivan Reitman and his wife Geneviève Robert approached Goldman and Toll with the aim of adapting the sketch into a film. The film is Robert's sole directing effort. Reitman served as the film's executive producer.

The plot element of AIDS was incorporated in the script to address changing mores about sex in the late 1980s. A question mark was added to the film's title to acknowledge cultural anxieties surrounding casual sex during the AIDS epidemic.

== Plot ==
Stacy Hunter has a promiscuous past and, after learning of the AIDS epidemic, wants to find a man whom she knows is "clean". She convinces her considerably more prudish childhood friend Melissa Halpern to go to The Oasis, a health spa resort for singles so that they can hopefully each find the man of their dreams. At the spa, Stacy meets Nick Lawrence, a struggling musician with whom she is taken, and also encounters Vinny Falcone, a.k.a. "the Vin Man", an annoying Italian-American man from New Jersey whom she tries to avoid.

At the resort's International Night themed party, Stacy becomes Vinny's date for the evening. She patiently goes through his advances and the evening until he walks her to her door. Meanwhile, Melissa meets Matthew, a psychologist, at the party. Melissa also connects with a spa staff member, Jamie, who has taken an apparent liking to her.

At the next evening party, Nick sings a song for Stacy and kisses her, which upsets Vinny. Matthew and Melissa get down to have sex, but Matthew abruptly stops, saying he is not attracted to her. Melissa gets back to her room and overhears Stacy and Nick having sex. Disappointed, Melissa leaves a note to Stacy and leaves to catch the 8 o'clock bus to Los Angeles, which she misses. Jamie finds Melissa at the bus stop, and convinces her to come back to the spa.

Meanwhile, Stacy gets the note, worrying about Melissa, and she wishes to get back home. Nick insists on going with her. Stacy offers her place for him to stay so that he can try a career in music in L.A. They hurriedly catch the 2 o'clock bus, not knowing Melissa stayed back.

Stacy realizes that she does not actually like Nick or see him as the man she thought he was back at the resort. Upon learning that Melissa is back at the resort and never even left, she hurriedly rents a pink Cadillac and drives all the way back, where she accidentally walks in on Melissa in bed with Jamie. Melissa tells Stacy about Jamie and how they have bonded with one another and how she had her first orgasm. Stacy is relieved that Melissa is in good spirits now and is thrilled that she and Jamie have found each other.

Then Stacy tells Melissa that she realizes she made a big mistake with Nick and she has to end it with him. Leaving the resort, she comes across Vinny waiting near the exit with his luggage in tow. He flags her down and begs her to drop him off at the nearest bus station. Reluctantly, Stacy agrees. Vinny lets his guard down and speaks plainly about how he really just does not understand the world of male and female relationships and how it all works. Stacy is touched by what he shares and gets new opinion of him. Stacy gets back home and ends the relationship with Nick. Upon returning to New Jersey and thereafter, Vinny experiences heavy changes in his attitude toward women and how he sees his life moving forward. He writes a letter to Stacy about the improved version of him.

After six months, Stacy visits Melissa and Jamie (who now live together) on New Year's Eve. At the end of the evening, as Stacy walks home by herself, she finds Vinny waiting for her in a fancy limousine, having driven all the way from New Jersey to California just to see her. She's taken aback but offers him breakfast. He gifts her a Golden Retriever puppy as a Christmas gift. Six years later, Melissa and Jamie visit Stacy's house for Christmas. She and Vinny are now married with two boys and a now-fully-grown Golden Retriever. As Vinny is greeting Jamie with his two boys and the dog, Stacy and Melissa look toward their two significant others. They both smile and hug each other.

== Cast ==
- Lea Thompson as Stacy Hunter
- Victoria Jackson as Melissa Halpern
- Stephen Shellen as Nick Lawrence
- Jerry Levine as Jamie
- Andrew Dice Clay as Vinny Falcone
- Mary Gross as Ileen
- Peter Dvorsky as Matthew
- Valerie Breiman as Megan
- David Sergeant as Frankie
- Cynthia Phillips as Ann
- Don Woodard as Gary Erdman
- Danny Breen as Dr. Goodman
- Bruce Abbott as Keith
- Susan Ann Connor as Dierdre
- Dan Woren as Clerk
- Dale Midkiff as Stranger
- Scott Thomson as Man
- Matthew Walker as Ronny
- Steven Ameche as Brian Ellis
- Steve Oedekerk as Joey Egan

== Reception ==
Casual Sex? received mixed reviews. On Rotten Tomatoes, the film holds a rating of 31% from 13 reviews.

Jonathan Rosenbaum of the Chicago Reader wrote, "Definitely a lightweight movie, without any heavy ambitions, but for the most part a likable one; with script and direction by women, it's considerably less arch and dehumanized than the usual sex comedy." Tom Charity of Time Out said, "After a variety of sketchy farcical/romantic complications, the movie settles for a rather sentimental epilogue, but it remains surprisingly engaging." Variety wrote, "All of the inventiveness on this subject comes through when the girls' imaginations take over and director Genevieve Robert makes more of these diversions than any other." TV Guide called the film "intelligent satire", adding, "This is hardly a film that is going to change anyone's life, but while profundity is not its aim, Casual Sex? has a ring of emotional truth, as it cleverly pokes fun at the crisis-altered sexual mores of the 1980s."

Michael Wilmington of the Los Angeles Times wrote "the only really good thing about this movie is the way it proves you don't have to be a man to make lewd, preposterous comedies". The New York Times's Janet Maslin said the film did not break any new ground compared to films like Where the Boys Are, saying "Aside from [some] confessional flourishes and the very infrequent bright remark ('It was the early 80's, and sex was still a good way to meet new people'), the film is as ordinary as it can be." People chided the film for its relatively conservative messaging. However, critics singled out Andrew Dice Clay's turn as Vinny as one of the film's unexpected highlights.
