= Dice: Undisputed =

2007 American reality television series

- Starring: Andrew "Dice" Clay
- Country of origin: United States
- No. of seasons: 1
- No. of episodes: 6

Production
- Running time: 30 Minutes

Original release
- Network: VH1
- Release: March 4 – April 1, 2007

Dice: Undisputed is an American reality show on VH1. The show stars Andrew 'Dice' Clay who was a popular comedian in the late 1980s and early 1990s. It follows Clay as he struggles to recapture his past popularity while dealing with his fiancée and two sons. The series premiered on March 4, 2007, and lasted only seven episodes. It was produced by Jeff Kuntz.

The working title for the show was Andrew Dice Clay: Structured Chaos.

== Episode listing ==
The episodes were:

- 2007-03-04 — Unfinished Business
- 2007-03-04 — The Road Trip- Miami Dice Dice visits Miami, Florida, but a booking mix-up costs him his dignity at a comedy club.
- 2007-03-11 — Dice Back on T.V. -- It's Showtime? Dice gets into an argument on the Wendy Williams Show.
- 2007-03-18 — The Dice Image - Hair Today, Gone Tomorrow Dice contemplates getting a hair transplant
- 2007-03-25 — The Album Recording
- 2007-04-01 — The Book Episode

== Reception ==
Mark A. Perigard of the Boston Herald gave the television series a C−, writing, "When he hits the stage for a comedy club called the Stress Factory, he immediately blasts a young woman in the front row with vulgarities. A young, handsome guy can get away with it, maybe. Dice, however, is a middle-aged fart and about as entertaining." The New York Times television critic Virginia Heffernan said, "The VH1 reality show Dice Undisputed — about his attempt at a career comeback, co-starring his two sons, his shrill fiancée and his motley entourage — is intended to shove him back in our faces, right where he apparently belongs. But we must again resist his advances. Let’s say it one more time: He’s charmless and unfunny." Common Sense Media's Sierra Filucci gave the show two stars and wrote, "even though he still affects a tough-guy exterior, Dice's added years and weight -- as well as his loving (and spirited) relationship with his fiancée -- lend him a similar softened appeal to that of reality-TV compatriot Hulk Hogan."
