= 40 Too Long =

Live album by Andrew Dice Clay
- Released: 1992
- Recorded: December 17–18, 1991
- Genre: Comedy
- Length: 60:31
- Label: American Recordings
- Producers: Rick Rubin, Andrew Dice Clay

Andrew Dice Clay chronology
The Day the Laughter Died (1990)	40 Too Long (1992)	The Day the Laughter Died, Part II (1993)

40 Too Long is a comedy album by American comedian Andrew Dice Clay, released in 1992. The album's name was taken from an argument he says he had with a Chinese clothing salesman who took his suit size (42 long) the wrong way and kept suggesting smaller sizes.

Tracks 1–29 comprise a show he recorded at Governor's Comedy Club in Levittown, New York, on December 17 and 18, 1991. The last two tracks are original songs recorded and sung by Clay. (Both songs would later be incorporated into the beginning and the end, respectively, of For Ladies Only on HBO.)

All tracks on this album were produced by Rick Rubin, except for tracks 30 and 31 which were produced by Clay himself.

== Track listing ==
1. Dice Goes to the Mall
2. Dice Talks to the Salesmen
3. Dice Buys a Suit
4. Dice on Disasters
5. Dice on Nutrition
6. Dice Just Says No Leno
7. Dice on Redheads
8. Dice on Lasting Relationships
9. Dice the Advocate
10. Dice Stops for Gas
11. Dice on Reading Material
12. Dice on Orgasms
13. Dice's Checklist
14. What a Mess
15. Dice on Reheaded Men
16. Dice Knows When to Say When
17. Dice on Complaints
18. Dice and Truckdrivers
19. Dice Jerks Off
20. Dice on Manners
21. Dice vs. Pee-wee
22. Dice at the Drive-Thru
23. Dice Gets Creative in Bed
24. Dice Learns to Mambo
25. Dice on Bodybuilders
26. Dice Does It Like Dis
27. Dice Has Random Thoughts
28. Dice Greeting Cards
29. Dice Rewrites History
30. Let Yourself Go
31. You May Be Dancing with Me
