= The Day the Laughter Died =

Live album by Andrew Dice Clay
- Released: March 14, 1990
- Recorded: December 26–27, 1989
- Venue: Dangerfield's, New York City
- Genre: Comedy
- Length: 102:14
- Label: Def American/Warner Bros.
- Producer: Rick Rubin

Andrew Dice Clay chronology
Dice (1989)	The Day the Laughter Died (1990)	Dice Rules (1991)

Professional ratings
Review scores
Source	Rating
AllMusic	2.5/5 stars

The Day the Laughter Died is a comedy double album by American comedian Andrew Dice Clay, released in 1990. It was produced by Rick Rubin, whose concept was to record an unadvertised performance in a small club with a small crowd, many of whom would not necessarily be fans of Clay's act. Clay chose a New York club owned by comedian Rodney Dangerfield, Dangerfield's, to record during the holiday season. A sequel, The Day the Laughter Died, Part II, was released in 1993.

The album is largely improvisational, with Clay interacting with the audience over the course of over an hour and a half. The topics run through his usual gamut of sex, relationships between men and women, masculinity and popular culture. Unlike his prior recordings, the jokes are delivered intentionally flat and raw as to offend and alienate the audience, turning the performance into the joke itself.

== Track listing ==
=== Disc one ===
1. "First Kiss" – 2:11
2. "Holiday Season" – 1:50
3. "The Tree" – 1:20
4. "Texas" – 3:05
5. "Places To Meet Chicks" – 3:07
6. "The Gift" – 1:40
7. "The Divider" – 2:11
8. "Personal Delivery Service" – 3:52
9. "Female Anatomy" – 3:42
10. "Under 2 Minutes" – 3:30
11. "Kids" – 2:01
12. "Mothers, Daughters & Sisters" – 2:49
13. "1990" – 2:13
14. "Jerkin' Off" – 1:20
15. "Milk & Shampoo" – 5:39
16. "Laughter vs. Comedy" – 1:07
17. "While The Cats Away..." – 3:19
18. "What'll It Be" – 2:16
19. "Pizza" – 1:49
20. "Concave" – 1:07
21. "Frozen Food" – 1:09

=== Disc two ===
1. "The Osmonds" – 4:24
2. "Hot Mama" – 2:18
3. "Turn-On Words" – 0:34
4. "Rhyme Renditions" – 3:52
5. "True Stories" – 0:41
6. "Automatic Pilot" – 1:47
7. "Dogs & Birds" – 2:49
8. "Women Comics" – 3:20
9. "Cigarettes" – 2:16
10. "A History Lesson" – 2:00
11. "Judy" – 3:34
12. "Mother & Son" – 3:37
13. "A+" – 2:47
14. "What Did She Say?" – 1:15
15. "Double Date" – 2:25
16. "Multiple Sclerosis" – 0:27
17. "How Are Ya?" – 0:50
18. "Silence Is Golden" – 0:17
19. "Hour Back...Get It?" – 6:40
20. "Something Soft" – 4:44
