= Live Fast, Die Fast =

Live Fast, Die Fast: Wicked Tales of Booze, Birds and Bad Language

Studio album by Wolfsbane
- Released: 14 August 1989
- Genre: Heavy metal
- Length: 34:50
- Label: Def American
- Producer: Rick Rubin

Wolfsbane chronology
Live Fast, Die Fast: Wicked Tales of Booze, Birds and Bad Language (1989)	All Hell's Breaking Loose Down at Little Kathy Wilson's Place (1990)

Professional ratings
Review scores
Source	Rating
AllMusic	4/5 stars

Live Fast, Die Fast: Wicked Tales of Booze, Birds and Bad Language is the debut album by English heavy metal band Wolfsbane, released in 1989. The album was produced by Rick Rubin for his Def American label. Promotional videos were made for two songs from this album, "Man Hunt" and "I Like It Hot", both of which received significant airplay on MTV's Headbangers Ball.

The album was rerecorded in 2025 with the new title Live Faster...

== Track listing ==
1. "Man Hunt" - 2:54
2. "Shakin'" - 3:41
3. "Killing Machine" - 2:55
4. "Fell Out of Heaven" - 3:03
5. "Money to Burn" - 3:49
6. "Greasy" - 3:16
7. "I Like It Hot" - 3:19
8. "All or Nothing" - 2:02
9. "Tears from a Fool" - 5:11
10. "Pretty Baby" - 4:44

== Personnel ==
- Blaze Bayley: Vocals
- Jason Edwards: Guitar
- Jeff Hately: Bass
- Steve Danger: Drums

== Charts ==
Chart (1989)	Peak position
UK Albums (Official Charts)	48
