= All Hell's Breaking Loose Down at Little Kathy Wilson's Place =

EP by Wolfsbane
- Released: 1990
- Genre: Heavy metal
- Length: 23:09
- Label: Def American
- Producer: Brendan O'Brien

Wolfsbane chronology
Live Fast, Die Fast (1989)	All Hell's Breaking Loose Down at Little Kathy Wilson's Place (1990)	Down Fall the Good Guys (1991)

Professional ratings
Review scores
Source	Rating
AllMusic	3/5 stars

All Hell's Breaking Loose Down at Little Kathy Wilson's Place is a mini-album by the band Wolfsbane released in 1990. The song "Kathy Wilson" was inspired by the 1953 sci-fi film Invaders From Mars, and features lines from the film voiced by Blaze Bayley.

Many of the songs would become firm fan favourites during Wolfbane's tour in support of Iron Maiden (a band that Blaze Bayley would later join in 1994 but leave 5 years later).

The cover artwork was by Simon Piasecki Maxted.

== Track listing ==
1. "Steel" - 4:57
2. "Paint the Town Red" - 3:06
3. "Loco" - 3:19
4. "Hey Babe" - 4:42
5. "Totally Nude" - 3:18
6. "Kathy Wilson" - 3:47

== Personnel ==
- Blaze Bayley: Vocals
- Jason Edwards: Guitar
- Jeff Hately: Bass
- Steve Danger: Drums

== Charts ==
Chart (1990)	Peak position
UK Albums (Official Charts)	48
