= El Llano, Aguascalientes =

Municipality in the Mexican state of Aguascalientes

El Llano
- Municipality
- Municipality location in Aguascalientes

- Location in Mexico
- Coordinates: 21°55′N 101°58′W
- Country: Mexico
- State: Aguascalientes
- Municipal seat: Palo Alto

Government
  - Federal electoral district: Aguascalientes's 1st

Area
  - Total: 509.77 km^{2} (196.82 sq mi)

Population (2015)
  - Total: 20,245
  - Density: 39.714/km^{2} (102.86/sq mi)

El Llano is a municipality in the Mexican state of Aguascalientes. It stands at 21°55′N 101°58′W.

As of 2010, the municipality had a total population of 18,828, up from 17,115 in 2005.

The municipality had 244 localities, the largest of which (with 2010 populations in parentheses) were: the municipal seat of Palo Alto (5,399), classified as urban, and Los Conos (1,108), Ojo de Agua de Crucitas (1,078), and Santa Rosa (El Huizache) (1,050), classified as rural.

== Demographics ==
Historical population
Year	Pop.	±%
2010	18,828	—
2015	20,245	+7.5%
2020	20,853	+3.0%
