= Heroes and Villains (album) =

Studio album by Paloalto
- Released: July 1, 2003
- Recorded: March – May 2002
- Genre: Alternative rock
- Length: 51:06
- Label: American Recordings
- Producer: Rick Rubin

Paloalto chronology
Paloalto (2000)	Heroes and Villains (2003)

Singles from Heroes and Villains
- 1. "Breathe In" Released: May 20, 2003; 2. "Fade Out/In" Released: 2003

Professional ratings
Aggregate scores
Source	Rating
Metacritic	72/100
Review scores
Source	Rating
AllMusic	3/5 stars

Heroes and Villains is the second album by alternative rock band Paloalto. The album was released by American Recordings in 2003.

The song "Breathe In" was featured on the Fox Television show The O.C. and the comic book film Hellboy. Another song, "Last Way Out of Here" was featured in the movie and on the soundtrack of The Perfect Score, with "The World Outside" making a prominent appearance in the film as well. Another song, "Fade Out/In", is present on the soundtrack for the 2003 movie, Daredevil.

== Reception ==
Heroes and Villains received positive reviews from critics. On Metacritic, the album holds a score of 72/100 based on 9 reviews, indicating "generally favorable reviews".

== Chart performance ==
On the Billboard Heatseeker Albums chart, Heroes and Villains peaked at #14.

== Track listing ==
1. "The World Outside"
2. "Fade Out/In"
3. "Last Way Out of Here"
4. "Breathe In"
5. "Going Going Gone"
6. "Throwing Stones"
7. "What You Are"
8. "Bones"
9. "Sleeping Citizens"
10. "Hangman"
11. "Always Running Home"
12. "Seed"
