= Down Fall the Good Guys =

Studio album by Wolfsbane
- Released: 9 July 1991
- Genres: Heavy metal, hard rock
- Length: 46.12
- Label: Def American
- Producer: Brendan O'Brien

Wolfsbane chronology
All Hell's Breaking Loose Down at Little Kathy Wilson's Place (1990)	Down Fall the Good Guys (1991)	Massive Noise Injection (1993)

Professional ratings
Review scores
Source	Rating
Allmusic	3/5 stars
Metal Hammer	5/5 stars

Down Fall The Good Guys is the second full-length album by the band Wolfsbane. Two singles were released from the album, "Ezy", which got to number 68, and "After Midnight", which did not chart. The album was produced by Brendan O'Brien, later famous for his work for The Black Crowes, The Offspring, Pearl Jam, Rage Against the Machine, Stone Temple Pilots and Neil Young. The album was engineered by Gareth Cousins.

The album cover artwork was by Simon Piasecki Maxted.

== Track list ==
1. "Smashed and Blind" - 4:41
2. "You Load Me Down" - 3:02
3. "Ezy" - 3:38
4. "Black Lagoon" - 4:43
5. "Broken Doll" - 4:41
6. "Twice as Mean" - 4:38
7. "Cathode Ray Clinic" - 5:02
8. "The Loveless" - 3:58
9. "After Midnight" - 4:05
10. "Temple of Rock" - 2:48
11. "Moonlight" - 2:18
12. "Dead at Last" - 2:40

== Personnel ==
- Blaze Bayley — lead vocals
- Jason Edwards — guitar, backing vocals, Choral sitar, piano
- Jeff Hately — bass, backing vocals
- Steve Danger — drums, percussion

== Charts ==
Chart (1991)	Peak position
UK Albums (Official Charts)	53
