= Paloalto =

American rock band

- Origin: Los Angeles, California, U.S.
- Genre: Alternative rock
- Years active: 2000–2005; 2014–Present
- Labels: American Recordings; State Champ Records
- Members: James Grundler; Marc Boggio; Tommy Black
- Past members: Jason Johnson; Alex Parnell; Andy Blunda; Florian Reinert

Paloalto is a rock band formed in Los Angeles, California. The band is not named after the city Palo Alto, but rather the lead singer and frontman James Grundler's preschool. Their debut album was released on Rick Rubin's American Recordings label and was produced by Rubin. Their second album, Heroes and Villains, reached #14 on the Billboard Heatseekers chart in 2003, on the strength of the song "Breathe In", which had been featured on The O.C. The song "Try" was the theme song on the 2003 Warner Brothers show "Tarzan".

After the band dissolved, Grundler formed a new band called Golden State. As of 2021, Grundler is still actively releasing new material under Golden State.

Paloalto has occasionally played a few reunion shows in the 2010s. On August 15, 2014, the band performed a reunion show at The Viper Room in West Hollywood, California. To commemorate the event, Grundler released the single “Don’t Give Up Before You Start”, the first release under the Paloalto name in over ten years. In 2018, the band performed live again supporting Walking Papers.

== Members ==
- James Grundler – vocals, guitar (previously lead singer of The Din Pedals)
- Marc Boggio – guitar
- Tommy Black – bass
- Steve Clark – drums

== Previous members ==
- Jason Johnson – guitar
- Alex Parnell – bass
- Andy Blunda – lead guitars, keyboards
- Florian Reinert – drums
- Jason Goodhue – bass

== Discography ==
=== Albums ===
- Paloalto (CD) – American Recordings – 2000
- Heroes and Villains (CD) – American Recordings – 2003

=== Singles ===
- "Sonny" (CD) – American Recordings – 2000
- "Fade Out/In" (CD) – American Recordings – 2002
- "Breathe In" (CD) – American Recordings – 2003
- "Don’t Give Up Before You Start" (Digital) – State Champ Records – August 11, 2014
- "Misery" (Digital) – State Champ Records – December 8, 2014

== In popular culture ==
- Paloalto's single "Breathe In" was used in the movie Hellboy.
- "Breathe In" was also used in the TV show Life As We Know It - Episode 3 - "The Best Laid Plans".
- The songs "Last Way Out of Here" and "The World Outside" was used in the movie The Perfect Score.
- The song "Fade Out/In" was used in the soundtrack for movie Daredevil but wasn't included in the film.
- The song "Going Going Gone" was used in the movie Shallow Hal.
- The song "Throwing Stones" was used in the TV show John Doe - Episode 19 - "Shock to the System".
