= Steven Ameche =

American lawyer

Steven Ameche is an American lawyer. He has also worked in television production and as a musician and actor.

== Law career ==
Ameche worked as an attorney and producer for King World Productions, a television production and distribution company. He later worked for the Hertz Investment Group.

In 2015, Ameche represented the appellee in the landmark Spady v. Bethlehem Area School District before the United States Court of Appeals for the Third Circuit. Ameche, along with famed forensic pathologist Dr. Cyril H. Wecht, defined the issue of delayed drowning.

== Entertainment career ==
Originally a musician - Janet Jackson, Philip Bailey and Gary US Bonds. Actor/musician on MGM's television series Fame. Later an actor - Knots Landing, Knightrider, Murder She Wrote. Film credits include Casual Sex and Mikki & Maude. Studied acting with Darryl Hickman. Cast as title role in Kaspar from the Peter Handke play which was later taken to the Edinburgh Festival (Scotland). As an attorney, producer, and/or actor Ameche has worked with Steven Spielberg, Debbie Allen, Roger King, Michael King, Stacy Keach, Kelly Osbourne, Bob Clark, Katy Perry, Ed Marinaro and many others.
