= Palo Alto, Aguascalientes =

Town in the Mexican state of Aguascalientes

Palo Alto
- Town
- Nickname: Palo Ranch
- Location in Mexico Palo Alto (Mexico)
- Coordinates: 21°55′N 101°58′W
- Country: Mexico
- State: Aguascalientes
- Municipality: El Llano

Population (2010)
  - Total: 5,399
- Time zone: UTC-6 (Central Standard Time)

Palo Alto is a town in the Mexican state of Aguascalientes. It stands at 21°55′N 101°58′W. It serves as the municipal seat for the surrounding municipalities of El Llano.

As of 2010, Palo Alto had a total population of 5,399.

== Climate ==
Climate data for Palo Alto (1991–2020)
Month	Jan	Feb	Mar	Apr	May	Jun	Jul	Aug	Sep	Oct	Nov	Dec	Year
Record high °C (°F)	29.0 (84.2)	32.0 (89.6)	35.0 (95.0)	39.0 (102.2)	39.0 (102.2)	38.0 (100.4)	36.0 (96.8)	35.0 (95.0)	35.0 (95.0)	33.0 (91.4)	32.0 (89.6)	30.0 (86.0)	39.0 (102.2)
Mean daily maximum °C (°F)	22.6 (72.7)	24.6 (76.3)	27.2 (81.0)	29.6 (85.3)	31.2 (88.2)	29.6 (85.3)	27.3 (81.1)	27.1 (80.8)	26.2 (79.2)	26.1 (79.0)	24.6 (76.3)	23.1 (73.6)	26.6 (79.9)
Daily mean °C (°F)	12.4 (54.3)	14.3 (57.7)	16.4 (61.5)	18.9 (66.0)	21.2 (70.2)	21.5 (70.7)	20.2 (68.4)	20.0 (68.0)	19.2 (66.6)	17.6 (63.7)	15.1 (59.2)	12.9 (55.2)	17.5 (63.5)
Mean daily minimum °C (°F)	2.3 (36.1)	3.9 (39.0)	5.7 (42.3)	8.3 (46.9)	11.2 (52.2)	13.4 (56.1)	13.1 (55.6)	12.9 (55.2)	12.3 (54.1)	9.1 (48.4)	5.6 (42.1)	2.7 (36.9)	8.4 (47.1)
Record low °C (°F)	−9.0 (15.8)	−7.0 (19.4)	−4.0 (24.8)	0.0 (32.0)	4.0 (39.2)	6.0 (42.8)	6.0 (42.8)	8.0 (46.4)	3.0 (37.4)	−2.0 (28.4)	−7.0 (19.4)	−9.0 (15.8)	−9.0 (15.8)
Average precipitation mm (inches)	20.6 (0.81)	16.4 (0.65)	7.4 (0.29)	8.8 (0.35)	28.6 (1.13)	107.4 (4.23)	117.2 (4.61)	121.5 (4.78)	85.3 (3.36)	34.1 (1.34)	13.3 (0.52)	9.0 (0.35)	569.6 (22.43)
Average precipitation days (≥ 0.1 mm)	2.0	1.7	1.0	1.3	3.4	8.1	10.1	9.6	7.4	3.7	1.6	1.3	51.2
Source: Servicio Meteorologico Nacional
