= Paloalto (album) =

Studio album by Paloalto
- Released: September 19, 2000
- Genre: Alternative rock
- Length: 53:15
- Label: American Recordings

Paloalto chronology
Sonny (2000)	Paloalto (2000)	Heroes and Villains (2003)

Professional ratings
Review scores
Source	Rating
AllMusic	3/5 stars

Paloalto is the debut album by alternative rock band Paloalto. It was produced by Rick Rubin and released by American Recordings in 2000. Scott Weiland of Stone Temple Pilots covered "Some Things Must Go This Way" for his 2008 album "Happy" in Galoshes.

== Track listing ==
1. "Depression Age"
2. "Sonny"
3. "Monolith"
4. "Throw the Brick"
5. "Home"
6. "Some Things Must Go This Way"
7. "The Mayor and the Seizure Pills"
8. "Coming Back from the Sun"
9. "Too Many Questions"
10. "Swim"
11. "Beauty of Disaster"
12. "Made of Stone"
