= Face Down, Ass Up =

Live album by Andrew Dice Clay
- Released: 2000
- Genre: Comedy
- Length: 1:10:57
- Label: The Right Stuff

Andrew Dice Clay chronology
Filth (1998)	Face Down, Ass Up (2000)	Indestructible (2012)

Face Down, Ass Up is a comedy album by American comedian Andrew Dice Clay, released in 2000.

== Track listing ==
1. Banana Girl – 0:33
2. Dice Funk-Up – 1:29
3. He Said, She Said – 7:42
4. Sid and the Oriental – 3:17
5. K2Y: China Diner – 2:37
6. The Poem – 0:24
7. Big Head – 0:55
8. Midgets 2000 – 5:19
9. Banana Nose – 0:33
10. Big Tit/Pin Tit – 3:59
11. K2Y: Wife – 0:47
12. Sid/All Bound Up – 0:16
13. Never Marry Her – 1:21
14. For Who, For Her, For What – 0:35
15. The Honeymoon – 1:53
16. The Honeymoon's Over – 0:55
17. Road Call – 1:22
18. Date Night at the Movies – 3:47
19. Home or Office, You Decide – 0:44
20. The Pencil Room – 1:19
21. Old School Phone – 6:59
22. My Cum – 1:29
23. Grocery - Part 1 – 0:31
24. Fish Tank – 0:28
25. Grocery - Part 2 – 1:22
26. Rita's Ass Funnel – 1:41
27. Flat Ass/Fat Ass – 1:10
28. My Statement – 1:02
29. Fat Ass House Mix – 2:26
30. Sid/In the Toilet – 2:31
31. Club 33 (featuring Snoop Dogg) – 3:10
32. Good 4 U 5:04
33. Club 33 (featuring Snoop Dogg) (Reprise) – 3:17
