= Palo Alto Plantation =

Palo Alto Plantation may refer to:

- Palo Alto Plantation (Donaldsonville, Louisiana)
- Palo Alto Plantation (Palopato, North Carolina)
