= Massive Noise Injection =

Live album by Wolfsbane
- Released: 1993
- Recorded: 20 February 1993, The Marquee, London
- Genre: Heavy metal
- Length: 58:35
- Label: Bronze / Castle
- Producer: Simon Efemey & Wolfsbane

Wolfsbane chronology
Down Fall the Good Guys (1991)	Massive Noise Injection (1993)	Wolfsbane (1994)

Professional ratings
Review scores
Source	Rating
Allmusic	3/5 stars

Massive Noise Injection is a live album by the band Wolfsbane recorded at The Marquee, London on 20 February 1993.

== Track listing ==
1. "Protect & Survive" – 3:47
2. "Load Me Down" – 3:02
3. "Black Lagoon" – 4:54
4. "Rope & Ride" – 4:08
5. "Kathy Wilson" – 4:21
6. "Loco" – 3:33
7. "End of the Century" – 4:10
8. "Steel" – 4:56
9. "Temple of Rock" – 5:37
10. "Manhunt" – 3:56
11. "Money to Burn" – 6:56
12. "Paint the Town Red" – 3:48
13. "Wild Thing" – 5:31
14. "Hollow Man" (Vinyl/Japan Only)*
15. "Want Me All the Time" (Vinyl/Japan Only)*
- The extra tracks were only available on the limited edition double vinyl and the Japanese CD releases. They are now included as bonus tracks on the 20th anniversary CD available on the band's website. Studio versions of these tracks were available on the Bonus CD Everything Else.
- The sleeve lists the two extra tracks in the wrong order, though the order is correct on the record.
- Blaze Bayley introduces "Hollow Man" as "The Hollow Man". "Want Me All the Time" is known as "Want Me" on Everything Else.
- Of the new songs that featured on this album, only "Protect & Survive" appeared on the following studio album Wolfsbane. Studio versions of "Rope & Ride", "End of the Century", "Hollow Man" and "Want Me (All the Time)" are all featured on the Bonus CD Everything Else.

== Line up ==
- Blaze Bayley: Vocals
- Jason Edwards: Guitar
- Jeff Hately: Bass
- Steve Danger: Drums
