= Wolfsbane (album) =

Studio album by Wolfsbane
- Released: 1994
- Recorded: Great Linford Manor
- Genre: Heavy metal
- Length: 41:53
- Label: Bronze / Castle
- Producer: Simon Efemey & Wolfsbane

Wolfsbane chronology
Massive Noise Injection (1993)	Wolfsbane (1994)	Lifestyles of the Broke and Obscure (2001)

Professional ratings
Review scores
Source	Rating
Allmusic	2.5/5 stars

Wolfsbane was the 1994 third album from British heavy metal band Wolfsbane. Not long after the album's release, vocalist Blaze Bayley took over Bruce Dickinson's position as the lead vocalist for Iron Maiden. It would end up becoming Wolfsbane's final studio album before their 16-year breakup from 1994 to 2010.

== Track listing ==
All tracks written by Wolfsbane.

1. "Wings" (4.21)
2. "Lifestyles of the Broke and Obscure" (3.47)
3. "My Face" (3.26)
4. "Money Talks" (4.25)
5. "Seen How It's Done" (4.36)
6. "Beautiful Lies" (3.36)
7. "Protect and Survive" (3.24)
8. "Black Machine" (3.13)
9. "Violence" (3.41)
10. "Die Again" (13.23 - includes "hidden" track "Say Goodbye")

=== Limited Edition Bonus CD ===
A limited edition bonus CD, entitled Everything Else, was included with the initial release. All tracks were written by Wolfsbane except for track 3 written by Anti-Nowhere League, and track 6 written by Bruce Springsteen

1. "Rope and Ride" (3.50)
2. "Want Me" (3.39)
3. "For You" (2.56)
4. "End of the Century" (3.07)
5. "Hollow Man" (3.32)
6. "Born to Run" (4.12)

== Line up ==
- Blaze Bayley: Vocals
- Jason Edwards: Guitar
- Jeff Hately: Bass
- Steve Ellet: Drums

== Charts ==
Chart (1994)	Peak position
UK Albums (OCC)	91
