= Andrew Dice Clay =

American comedian and actor (born 1957)

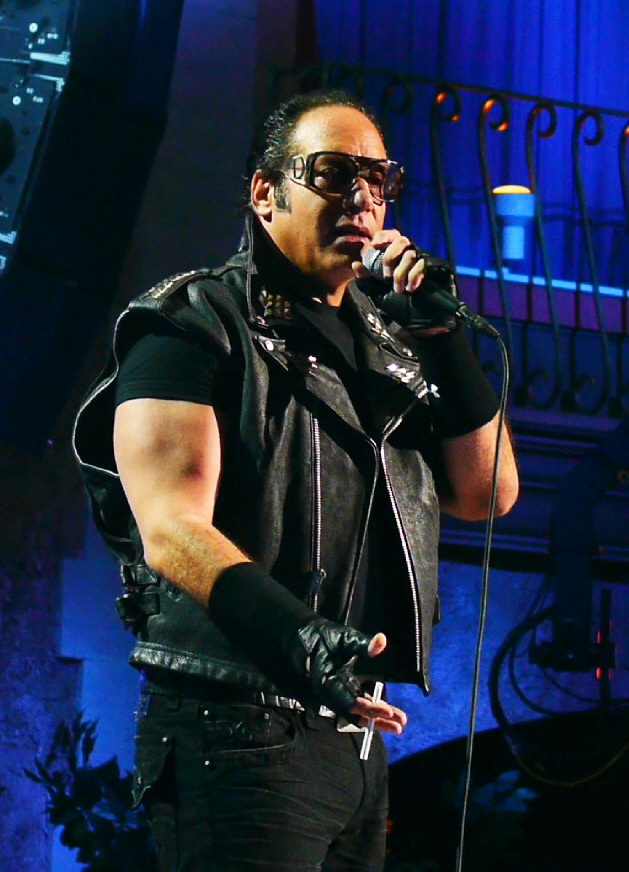
- Clay in 2012
- Born: Andrew Clay Silverstein; September 29, 1957 (age 69); Brooklyn, New York, U.S.
- Spouses: Kathleen Swanson (m. 1984; div. 1986) Kathleen Monica (m. 1992; div. 2002) Valerie Vasquez (m. 2010; div. 2014)
- Children: 2

Comedy career
- Years active: 1978–present
- Medium: Stand-up comedy, television, film
- Genres: Character comedy, observational comedy, improvisational comedy, political satire, blue comedy, shock humour, anti-humour

Andrew Clay Silverstein (born September 29, 1957) known professionally as Andrew Dice Clay is an American stand-up comedian and actor. He rose to prominence in the late 1980s with a brash, deliberately offensive persona known as "The Diceman", a cartoonishly hyper-masculine, Italian-American street-tough caricature that claimed to weaponise misogyny, ethnic bravado and shock but caused widespread offense.

In 1990, Clay became the first stand-up comedian to sell out Madison Square Garden for two consecutive nights. That same year, he played the lead role in the comedy-mystery film The Adventures of Ford Fairlane.

Clay has appeared in several films and television shows, including critically acclaimed supporting roles in Woody Allen's Blue Jasmine (2013) and the 2018 remake of A Star Is Born, the latter of which earned him a nomination for the Screen Actors Guild Award for Best Performance by a Cast. He continues his acting career while also touring and performing stand-up. The television show Dice aired on Showtime for two seasons. He also launched a podcast, I'm Ova Hea' Now, in September 2018.

== Early life ==
Clay was born to parents Jacqueline and Fred Silverstein in the Sheepshead Bay neighborhood of Brooklyn in New York City, where he was raised. He is Jewish. He has one sister. Clay's father was a boxer and real estate agent.

At age five, Clay was entertaining his family with impressions, and by seven he was playing drums, inspired by the sounds of big band music. Clay attended James Madison High School in Brooklyn and as a teenager worked as a drummer on the Catskill Mountains circuit in the 1970s, playing bar mitzvahs and weddings under the name Clay Silvers. Upon returning to New York City, he failed to form a big band of his own. He pursued higher education but dropped out to become a full-time comedian. Clay cites Elvis Presley, Fonzie, John Travolta, and Sylvester Stallone as his heroes.

== Career ==
=== 1970s ===
Clay began his stand-up career in 1978 when he auditioned at Pips comedy club in Sheepshead Bay, which turned into a headline spot at the venue the next week, billed as Andrew Clay. His act was mainly impressions, including a character named "The Diceman", based on Jerry Lewis as Buddy Love from The Nutty Professor, which transformed into John Travolta's character Danny Zuko from Grease. It took him three weeks to prepare the act. A picture of him on stage during his early sets at Pips was described: "In a baggy white shirt, pants rolled up to his knees and a pair of thick glasses", with a black leather jacket underneath the shirt so he could seamlessly switch to his Travolta character when the lights went out. With his new act, Clay graduated to larger and more prestigious comedy venues, including The Improv, Catch a Rising Star and Dangerfield's. He recalled his father being supportive of his act during one performance at Dangerfield's. "He knew it was different right off the bat [...] He saw it worked". The persona was more of a shock to his mother, but she got used to it and he recalled her laughing at his jokes.

=== 1980s ===
By 1980, Clay had moved to Los Angeles and landed work at the Comedy Store, owned by Mitzi Shore. His sets were not an instant hit, and because of his dirty act and her unwillingness to have other comics follow him, Shore had Clay perform at late hours, making him "wait and perform for ten drunks". In 1982, Clay landed his first film role, in Wacko. In 1983, Clay added the "Diceman" moniker to his name and no longer relied on impressions, instead creating an alter ego based on his heroes. He first used the act at the Comedy Store after he was asked to fill in for a comic who canceled their spot. He said: "I didn't have my Jerry Lewis stuff with me, so I just winged it, saying whatever popped in my head".

Clay's performances at the venue led to his first sitcom roles, with appearances on M*A*S*H and Diff'rent Strokes, and feature-length films, including Making the Grade (1984), Pretty in Pink (1986) and Casual Sex? (1988). A review by Los Angeles Times critic Michael Wilmington described Clay's character Vinny Falcone as "a macho bozo from Jersey". From 1986 to 1988, he had a regular role as Max Goldman on Crime Story. His act included a drum solo as a tribute to Buddy Rich. Clay then pursued stand-up comedy full-time as the Dice character.

Clay's breakthrough came in 1988 when he performed at an all-male Big Brother Association dinner event with "all of Hollywood's royalty [...] dressed in tuxedos, and I show up in a black leather jacket with a flag on the back that said 'Rock and Roll'". The set was a hit; the next day, 20th Century Fox offered him a film deal and entered talks with producer Joel Silver. Also in 1988, Clay performed a seven-minute set at Dangerfield's in New York City for Rodney Dangerfield's HBO stand-up showcase special Nothing Goes Right, launching him into the national spotlight.

In January 1989, Clay's HBO special, The Diceman Cometh, appeared on HBO. It became a top video rental, according to Entertainment Weekly. In March, he released his debut comedy album, Dice, which was certified gold by the RIAA for selling over 500,000 copies in the U.S. It peaked at No. 89 on the Billboard 200. Clay was named Comedy Act of the Year by readers of Performance magazine. In September 1989, Clay performed a three-minute set to introduce Cher, at the 1989 MTV Video Music Awards, which included Otto Petersen's adult versions of the Mother Goose nursery rhymes. The incident led to MTV imposing a lifetime ban on Clay from appearing on the network. The ban was lifted in 2011. In December 1989, Clay performed two unadvertised, largely improvised sets at Dangerfield's, which were recorded for his second comedy album, The Day the Laughter Died, produced by Rick Rubin. Released in March 1990 on Geffen Records, the album sold 250,000 copies in seven weeks, peaking at No. 39 on the Billboard 200.

=== 1990s ===
In February 1990, Clay became the first comedian to sell out two consecutive nights at Madison Square Garden in New York City, totaling 38,000 people in attendance. When Clay was booked to host a Saturday Night Live episode on May 12, 1990, cast member Nora Dunn refused to appear in the episode due to the sexist and homophobic content in Clay's stand-up act. Sinéad O'Connor also canceled her appearance as the episode's musical guest in protest. During Clay's opening monologue, security guards removed protesters from the studio. NBC used a five-second tape delay to cut offensive content from the live broadcast, but one remark escaped removal. The episode was the show's fourth-highest-rated episode of the 15th season.

Clay first met his agent Dennis Arfa at Dangerfield's, which led to his first HBO special and ultimately his starring role in the 1990 film The Adventures of Ford Fairlane; in 1991, he received the Golden Raspberry Award for Worst Actor for his performance in the film. In 1991, Clay ran his own production company, Fleebin Dabble Productions. He is featured on the front cover of the April 1991 issue of Penthouse, becoming the second man to front the magazine, after George Burns. Footage of Clay's shows at Madison Square Garden was used to produce his 1991 stand-up concert film Dice Rules. His controversial act affected the number of venues willing to screen the film; it opened in 40 theatres nationwide. 20th Century Fox was originally to release it, but it dropped out over the controversial material, leaving it to be picked up by Seven Arts. This was followed by the release of One Night with Dice, filmed in 1986. A sell-out show at Symphony Hall in Salt Lake City in August 1991 was met with angry protesters outside the venue over his perceived homophobia and hateful material, during which police were called.

In 1993, ABC dropped a proposed one-hour television drama that was to feature Clay after management deemed him too controversial. Clay had signed a one-year deal with ABC that kept him from working with other networks. In July 1993, Clay released No Apologies, the first stand-up concert pay-per-view special. It was purchased by over 250,000 homes and was the highest-grossing non-sports pay-per-view event of the year. It was to feature Joey Buttafuoco, but the plan was dropped on his attorney's advice after the publicity it attracted. Clay followed it with a second pay TV special, The Valentine's Day Massacre, which aired in around 100,000 homes. In 1994, Clay accepted more TV roles.

In 1995, Clay signed a development deal with CBS and producer Bruce Helford, resulting in his starring role on the sitcom Bless This House. In mid-1995, Clay explained that the Diceman character had "sort of gone out of hand", which he felt happy about because it allowed him to pursue more television and film work. The situation led to a change in his stand-up act, focusing more on being a husband and a father, yet still with an "edge". In 1996, Clay released an HBO special, Assume the Position, returning to his Diceman character. In 1998, Clay released the triple album Filth through his website. Later in 1998, he began appearing on the New York City-based radio show Opie and Anthony. His opening act at the time, Jim Norton, became the show's co-host in late 2000.

=== 2000s ===
In 2000, Clay released I'm Over Here Now and Banned for Life. Later in 2000, he released Face Down, Ass Up. He supported these with a nationwide tour that included a headline show at Madison Square Garden, ten years after his two sold-out performances.

In a November 2003 CNN appearance Clay was criticized by an interviewer, who described the comedian as being in the waning years of his career. Clay walked out of the interview in a barrage of profanity.

In 2005, Clay signed a deal with Sirius Satellite Radio to broadcast his own show, Out of the Cage. In 2007, he attempted a mainstream comeback with the reality TV series Dice: Undisputed on VH1, which lasted seven episodes.

Clay appeared as a part of NBC's The Celebrity Apprentice 2 and was the first celebrity to be fired after he openly entertained the idea of quitting in Donald Trump's presence and called him "Donny Trump". On The Howard Stern Show, Clay said the show was edited to exclude situations where Trump treated Clay poorly, based on his comic treatment of women rather than his accomplishments. Throughout the season, each celebrity was raising money for a charity of their choice; Clay had selected StandUp For Kids.

=== 2010s ===
In 2011, Clay was featured in the eighth and final season of Entourage as Johnny Drama (Kevin Dillon)'s co-star in the fictional program Johnny's Bananas. Clay also appeared as himself in the Entourage film. He appeared in an episode of Raising Hope as himself, which aired on November 29, 2011. In May 2012, Clay appeared on The Joe Rogan Experience podcast and also did a set at The Bamboozle festival in Asbury Park. In December 2012, he had a stand-up comedy special on Showtime titled Indestructible. In May 2013, Clay began a podcast with Michael Wheels named Rollin' with Dice and Wheels...The Podcast. It ran for 46 episodes, the last of which was released in December 2015.

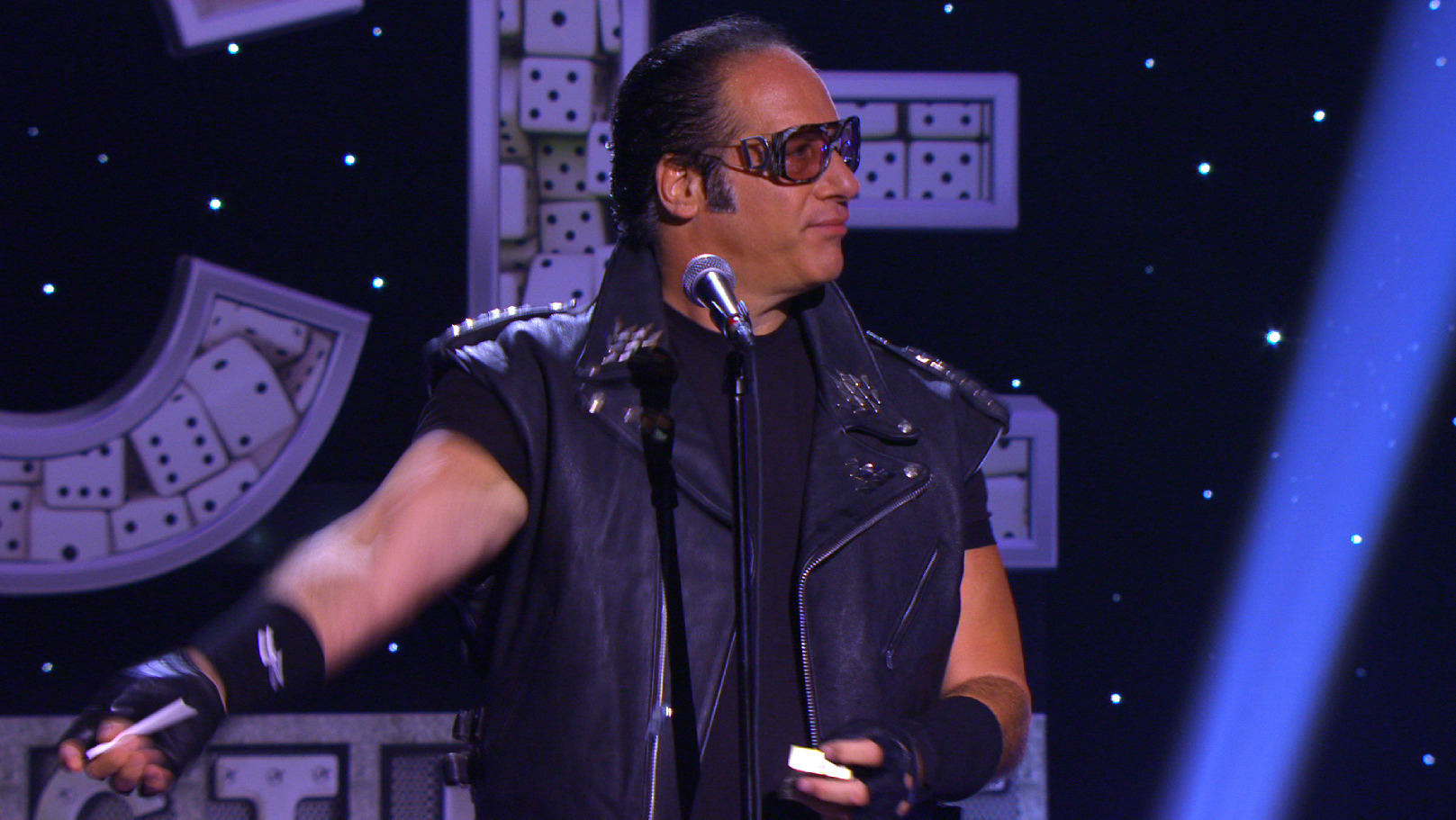
Clay in 2012

Clay appeared with Cate Blanchett in Woody Allen's Blue Jasmine, which opened on July 26, 2013. In an interview with Good Day L.A., Clay said that, as he had not been in a movie in 12 years, "It was a thrill to do something dramatic, something I've always wanted to do." His performance was critically praised. In July 2013, Clay signed a book deal with Simon & Schuster for a memoir to be co-authored with David Ritz. In November 2014, Clay released his book The Filthy Truth.

In 2015, Clay hosted The Blue Show, showcasing some of his favorite blue comics, which was released on Showtime. In 2016, Clay had a guest role as record executive Frank "Buck" Rodgers in the Martin Scorsese/Mick Jagger-produced television series Vinyl for HBO. In 2017, Clay competed in and won, with his wife Valerie Silverstein, the Fox reality cooking series My Kitchen Rules. In September 2018, Clay launched his podcast I'm Ova Hea' Now on the GaS Digital Network. Later that year, he appeared as Lorenzo Campana in the musical drama film A Star is Born, alongside Lady Gaga and Bradley Cooper, playing Gaga's character Ally's father. Clay beat out several high-profile actors for the part, including Robert De Niro and Ray Liotta, and his performance received positive reviews, as did the film.

== Personal life ==
Clay has married three times. From 1984 to 1986, he was married to Kathy Swanson and from 1992 to 2002 to Kathleen "Trini" Monica. He had two sons with Monica, one of whom, Max, has followed his father into stand-up comedy and occasionally opens for him on tour. Clay's third marriage was to hairstylist Valerie Vasquez from 2010 to 2014. Clay was in an eight-year relationship with his ex-fiancée, comedian Eleanor Kerrigan.

In 2017, Clay had a stent placed in a partially blocked artery.

== Discography ==
- ADC: The Mixtape That Hates You (1988)
- Dice (1989)
- The Day the Laughter Died (1990)
- Dice Rules Live at Madison Square Garden (1991)
- 40 Too Long (1992)
- The Day the Laughter Died, Part II (1993)
- No Apologies (1993)
- Filth (1998)
- Face Down, Ass Up (2000)
- Indestructible (2012)
- Comedy King (2023)
- Nursery Rhymes (2023)

== Filmography ==
=== Comedy specials ===
Year	Title	Role	Notes
1981	An Evening at the Improv	Himself	
1984	Dirty Dirty Jokes	Himself	Stand-up showcase hosted by Redd Foxx
1986	Andrew Dice Clay: One Night with Dice	Himself	Stand-up special
1987	Nothin' Goes Right	Himself	HBO stand-up showcase hosted by Rodney Dangerfield
1989	The Diceman Cometh	Himself	HBO stand-up comedy special
1991	Dice Rules	Himself	Stand-up concert film
1992	Andrew Dice Clay: For Ladies Only	Himself	HBO stand-up comedy special
1993	Andrew Dice Clay: No Apologies	Himself	Pay-per-view stand-up comedy special
1994	Andrew Dice Clay and His Gang Live! The Valentine's Day Massacre	Himself	Pay-per-view stand-up comedy special
1996	Andrew Dice Clay: Assume the Position	Himself	HBO stand-up comedy special
2000	Andrew Dice Clay: I'm Over Here Now	Himself	Pay-per-view stand-up comedy special
2012	Andrew Dice Clay: Indestructible	Himself	Showtime stand-up comedy special
2015	Andrew Dice Clay presents The Blue Show	Himself	Showtime stand-up comedy special

=== Film ===
Year	Title	Role	Notes
1982	Wacko	Tony Schlongini	
1984	Making the Grade	"Dice"	
1984	Night Patrol	Tony Baroni	
1985	Private Resort	Curt	
1986	Pretty in Pink	Bouncer	
1987	Amazon Women on the Moon	Frankie	Segment: "Video Date"
1988	Casual Sex?	Vinny Falcone	
1990	The Adventures of Ford Fairlane	Ford Fairlane	
1993	Brainsmasher... A Love Story	Ed "The Brainsmasher" Malloy	
1995	No Contest	Raymond Ulysses "Oz" Brice	
1995	Jury Duty	Uncle Sal	Uncredited
1995	The Chili Con Carne Club	The Cooler (voice)	Short film
1997	The Good Life	Albert	Never released
1998	Whatever It Takes	Dave Menardi	
1999	Foolish	Ron "El Dorado Ron"	
2000	My 5 Wives	Tony Morano	
2000	Point Doom	Frankie	
2001	One Night at McCool's	Utah / Elmo	As Andrew Silverstein
2012	JJ Star... How Embarrassing	Himself (voice)	
2013	Blue Jasmine	Augie	
2015	Entourage	Himself	
2018	A Star Is Born	Lorenzo Campana	
2023	Warrior Strong	Avery Schmidt	
2025	The Pickup	Clark	
TBA	Lizard Music †	—N/a	Filming

=== Television ===
Year	Title	Role	Notes
1982	M*A*S*H	Corporal Hrabosky	Episode: "Trick or Treatment"
1982–1983	Diff'rent Strokes	Larry "Crazy Larry"	2 episodes
1983	The Young Landlords	A.B. Tucker	Television film
1986	Cinemax Comedy Experiment	Tough Kid	Episode: "Charlie Barnett's Terms of Enrollment"
1986–1988	Crime Story	Max Goldman	13 episodes
1989	Camp Midnite	Himself	Episode: "Show 112"
1990	Saturday Night Live	Himself/Host	Episode: "Andrew Dice Clay/Julee Cruise/Spanic Boys"
1995	Favorite Deadly Sins	Richard Spencer	Television film; segment: "Anger"
1995–1996	Bless This House	Burt Clayton	16 episodes
1997	Hitz	Jimmy Esposito	10 episodes
1997	The Chris Rock Show	Himself	Episode: "Arsenio Hall/Puff Daddy"
1997	Rugrats	Plumber (voice)	Episode: "Angelica Nose Best/Pirate Light"
1998	Dharma and Greg	Himself	Episode: "Unarmed and Dangerous"
1999	Chicken Soup for the Soul	Martin Scali	Episiode: "The Surprise Date"
2007	Dice: Undisputed	Himself	6 episodes
2009	The Apprentice	Himself	2 episodes
2011	Entourage	Himself	5 episodes
2011	Raising Hope	Himself	Episode: "Bro-gurt"
2012	That Metal Show	Himself	Episode: "Herman Rarebell & Andrew Dice Clay"
2013	The Blacklist	Abraham Maltz	Episode: "General Ludd (No. 109)"
2013	Tosh.0	Himself	5 episodes
2015–2016	TripTank	Grant / Paulie / Frankie / Caller (voice)	3 episodes
2016	Vinyl	Frank "Buck" Rogers	Episode: "Pilot"
2016–2017	Dice	Himself	13 episodes
2017	My Kitchen Rules	Himself	4 episodes
2018	Hap and Leonard	Sonny Knox	6 episodes
2020	The Comedy Store	Himself	3 episodes
2021	Gravesend	Rinaldo	2 episodes
2022	Pam & Tommy	Louis "Butchie" Peraino	2 episodes

== Awards and nominations ==
Year	Award	Category	Nominated work	Result
1991	Golden Raspberry Awards	Worst Actor	The Adventures of Ford Fairlane	Won
1992	Golden Raspberry Awards	Worst Actor	Dice Rules	Nominated
1992	Golden Raspberry Awards	Worst Screenplay (shared with Lenny Schulman)	Dice Rules	Nominated
2019	Screen Actors Guild Awards	Outstanding Performance by a Cast in a Motion Picture (shared with the cast)	A Star Is Born	Nominated
