= Wolfsbane (band) =

English heavy metal band

- Origin: Tamworth, Staffordshire, England
- Genres: Heavy metal; hard rock
- Years active: 1984–1994; 2007; 2009; 2010–present
- Labels: Def American; Bronze
- Members: Blaze Bayley; Jason Edwards; Jeff Hateley; Steve Danger
- Past members: Amanda Hemmings; Jason Lee Farrow; Jon Buckingham
- Website: wolfsbaneband.com

Wolfsbane are an English heavy metal band, active from 1984 to 1994, and again since 2010, following two brief reunions. To date, the band has released five studio albums, two live albums, two compilation albums, two EPs and three demos. Wolfsbane are now notable for being vocalist Blaze Bayley's band before he went on to replace Bruce Dickinson in Iron Maiden and then pursue a solo career. In addition to Bayley, the band's current lineup includes guitarist Jason "Jase" Edwards, bassist Jeff Hateley and drummer Steve Danger.

== History ==
=== Initial career (1984–1994) ===
Wolfsbane were formed in 1984 in Tamworth, Staffordshire, England. They signed to Def American records, and Rick Rubin produced their first album, Live Fast, Die Fast, released in 1989. Prior to this, they had recorded three demos entitled Wolfsbane (1985), Dancin' Dirty (1987) and Wasted but Dangerous (1988); the former was recorded in an old cellar. Wolfsbane's second release, an EP titled All Hell's Breaking Loose Down at Little Kathy Wilson's Place, was released in 1990, followed a year later by the band's second full studio album Down Fall the Good Guys (1991), which gave them their only UK Singles Chart entry with "Ezy" charting at No. 68. Despite not achieving the level of success that Def American had expected, Wolfsbane played from clubs to larger venues during the late 1980s and early 1990s with several notable acts, including Iron Maiden, Motörhead, Ozzy Osbourne, Alice Cooper, Anthrax, Overkill, Sepultura, Kreator, Dark Angel, King Diamond, Magnum, The Almighty, The Wildhearts, The Quireboys, among others.

Being an English band, signed to an American record label did not work out well for them. Def American dropped Wolfsbane as they felt that the band were not selling well enough. This did not stop the band from being voted as the UK's best unsigned act in 1993. The same year, the band released a live album, Massive Noise Injection, through the Bronze Company label.

The band released its third studio album, the self-titled Wolfsbane, in 1994, again on the Bronze Company label. A limited edition of this album included the EP Everything Else. However, when Bruce Dickinson left Iron Maiden, Blaze Bayley successfully auditioned to replace him as their new singer and left Wolfsbane later on that year. Wolfsbane disbanded as a result.

=== Post-breakup (1994–2007) ===
Jason Edwards, Jeff Hateley, and Steve Danger, the remaining members of Wolfsbane, joined with Jez 'Spencer' Housden to form the band Stretch in 1995. They released a 6-track mini-album World of Stretch on the Cottage Industry label.

=== One-off shows and reunion (2007–2021) ===
On 9 September 2007, Wolfsbane reformed for a one off short set at the Rock of Ages Festival in Tamworth. This was followed by their first UK tour in 13 years, with the band playing five dates as support for the Wildhearts in December 2007. Their next tour came in December 2009 supporting the Quireboys on their 'A Little Bit of What You Fancy 20th Anniversary Tour'.

Jason Edwards is currently a record producer, having most recently produced and mixed the self titled Wildhearts album and the Blaze Bayley album Promise and Terror. He also mixed two tracks on Ginger Wildheart's 555 album and recorded and produced two bonus tracks for Ginger's Hey! Hello! project as well as mixing tracks for German punk band Radio Dead Ones. He is also one of three guitarists in Ginger & the Sonic Circus (project of Ginger, songwriter/frontman of the Wildhearts), and plays guitar for the God Damn Whores, alongside 'Random' Jon Poole (formerly of Cardiacs, previously stand-in bassist for the Wildhearts and also in the Sonic Circus), Denzel (also of the Sonic Circus), and Robochrist.

Blaze Bayley subsequently left Iron Maiden and embarked on a solo career with forming his own band, Blaze and later a new line-up with the Blaze Bayley Band, before he switched again as a solo artist since 2012. During Blaze Bayley's tour in support of his then new album, Promise and Terror, tensions rose within the band. In the end of May 2010, both manager Anna Di Laurenzi and drummer Larry Paterson left the band to join Sinocence who had been the support band on the first leg of the tour. A couple of weeks later, in early June, Wolfsbane announced that they would be reuniting full-time and release a new album in 2011. Blaze Bayley continues to perform as a solo artist alongside singing with Wolfsbane.

On 12 March 2011, it was announced that Wolfsbane would release the EP, Did It for the Money, on 9 April. They played a headline show at the Borderline in London on the same day the EP was released (9 April 2011). This was followed by a tour supporting Saxon, in April 2011. On 7 October 2011, it was announced that Wolfsbane would release their fourth studio album in 2012. Titled Wolfsbane Save the World, it is available on the band's official website as well as via the merchandise stand on the band's upcoming tour.

On 24 October 2011, the band embarked on a UK tour. Joined by Manchester's Obsessive Compulsive as support for the tour. Footage from the 2011 UK tour can be seen on the Official Wolfsbane YouTube channel. On 15 December 2011, a video of the song "Smoke and Red Light" was added to the official Wolfsbane YouTube channel. The song is taken from the new album Wolfsbane Save the World and is based on the early days of the band's career.

On 17 October 2012, the band embarked on an 11 date UK tour. Special guest Givvi Flynn joined the band on stage for four of the shows to perform "Illusion of Love". On sale at the show was an album titled The Lost Tapes: A Secret History.

=== Genius and next album (2022–present) ===
On 11 May 2021, Wolfsbane announced on their Facebook page that they had begun writing their first album in nearly a decade. Frontman Blaze Bayley confirmed in a February 2022 interview that the band was "listening to the rough mixes" of their new album and "finishing off a little bit here and there", and also expressed hope that it would be released in June. Genius was revealed as the title of the album on 30 April 2022, and it was released on 5 June.

On 6 August 2024, Wolfsbane announced on their Facebook page that they are in the studio working on a new album.

== Members ==
=== Current members ===
- Blaze Bayley – lead vocals
- Jason Edwards – guitar, backing vocals
- Jeff Hateley – bass, backing vocals
- Steve Danger – drums

=== Former members ===
- Amanda "Poo Poos" Hemmings – drums (1984)
- Jason Lee Farrow – drums (1984)
- Jon Buckingham "Stakk Smasher" – drums (1985–1986)

== Discography ==
=== Studio albums ===
- Live Fast, Die Fast (1989)
- Down Fall the Good Guys (1991)
- Wolfsbane (1994)
- Wolfsbane Save the World (2012)
- Genius (2022)
- Live Faster (Live Fast, Die Fast - Re-Imagined, Re-Recorded) (2025)

=== Live albums ===
- Massive Noise Injection (1993)
- The Lost Tapes: A Secret History (2012)
- Go Loco at the Asylum (2018)

=== Compilation albums ===
- Lifestyles of the Broke and Obscure (2001)
- Howling Mad Shitheads (The Best of Wolfsbane) (2009)

=== EPs ===
- All Hell's Breaking Loose Down at Little Kathy Wilson's Place (1990)
- Everything Else (1994)
- Did It For the Money (2011)
- Rock! (2015)

=== Demos ===
- Wolfsbane (1985)
- Dancin' Dirty (1987)
- Wasted But Dangerous (1988)
