= Dangerfield's =

Comedy club in New York City

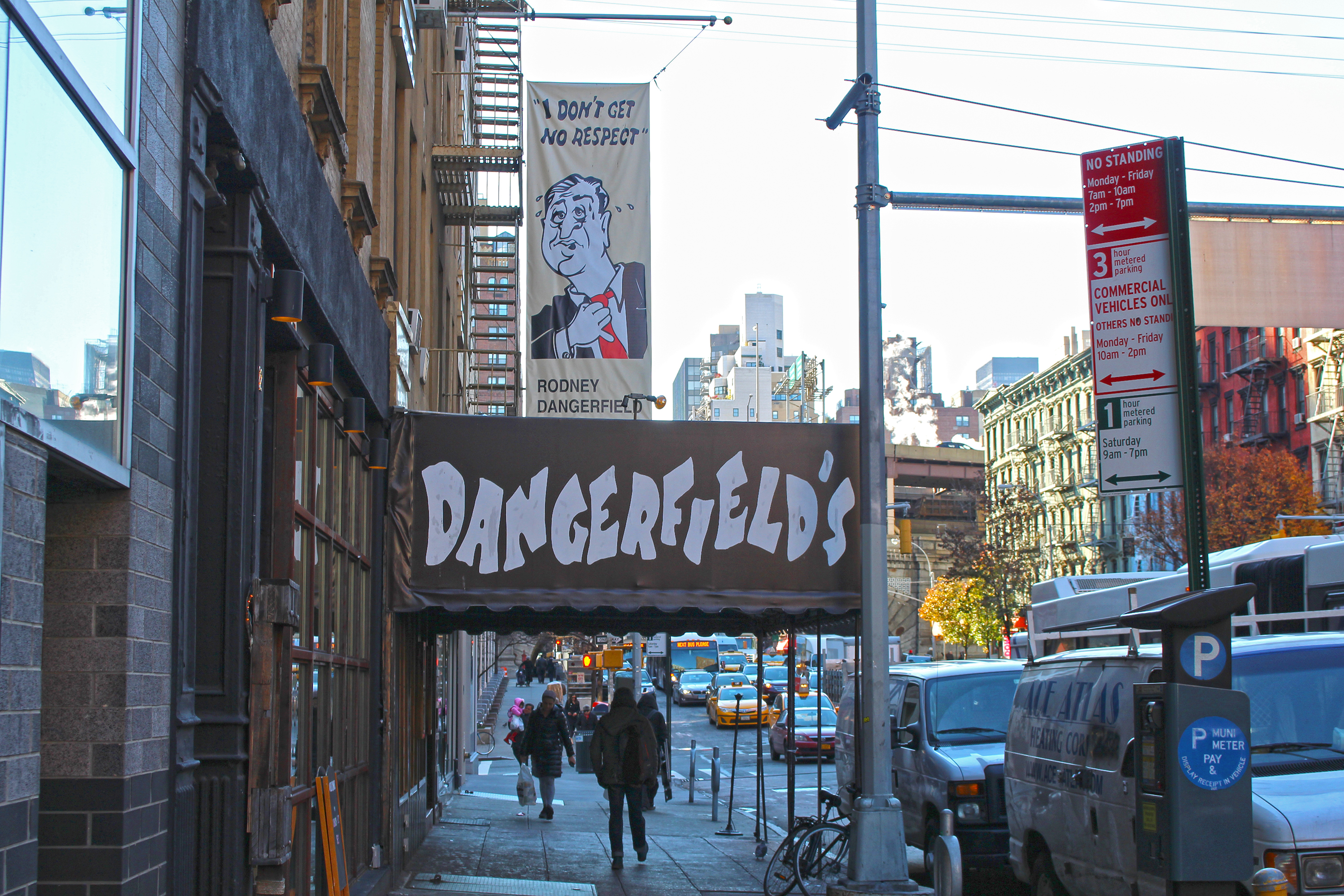
- Interactive map of Dangerfield's
- Address: 1118 First Avenue
- Location: New York City, United States
- Coordinates: 40.7610°N 73.9606°W
- Owner: The Rodney Dangerfield family; Anthony Bevacqua
- Type: Nightclub
- Event: Comedy

Construction
- Opened: September 29, 1969; 57 years ago

Website
- dangerfields.com

Dangerfield's is a comedy club located on the Upper East Side of Manhattan, New York City, United States, and named after comedian Rodney Dangerfield. The club was founded by Dangerfield and long-time friend Anthony Bevacqua and operated from 1969 to 2020. The venue was known for featuring only established headliners and was home to HBO comedy specials that showcased young comedians. The club closed in October 2020 due to the COVID-19 pandemic and reopened in January 2024 as Rodney's Comedy Club.

== History ==
The club opened on September 29, 1969. Kenny Burrell, Thelma Houston, and Rodney Dangerfield performed on the opening night, while Milton Berle, Ed McMahon, Joan Rivers, and David Frost were in the audience.

== Format and notable performers ==
Only headliners performed at Dangerfield's, with no amateur or open mic nights. Notable performers included George Carlin, Jay Leno, Tim Allen, Jerry Seinfeld, Chris Rock, Jim Carrey, Andrew Dice Clay, Dom Irrera, Roseanne Barr, Bill Hicks, Sam Kinison, Bob Nelson, Robert Townsend, John Melendez, Robert Schimmel and Jeff Foxworthy.

The club was home to HBO comedy specials that Rodney Dangerfield produced to showcase young comedians.

== Closure and reopening ==
The club closed in October 2020 due to the COVID-19 pandemic. On January 1, 2024, under the name Rodney's Comedy Club, the club reopened in the original location.
