= Rick Rubin =

American record producer (born 1963)

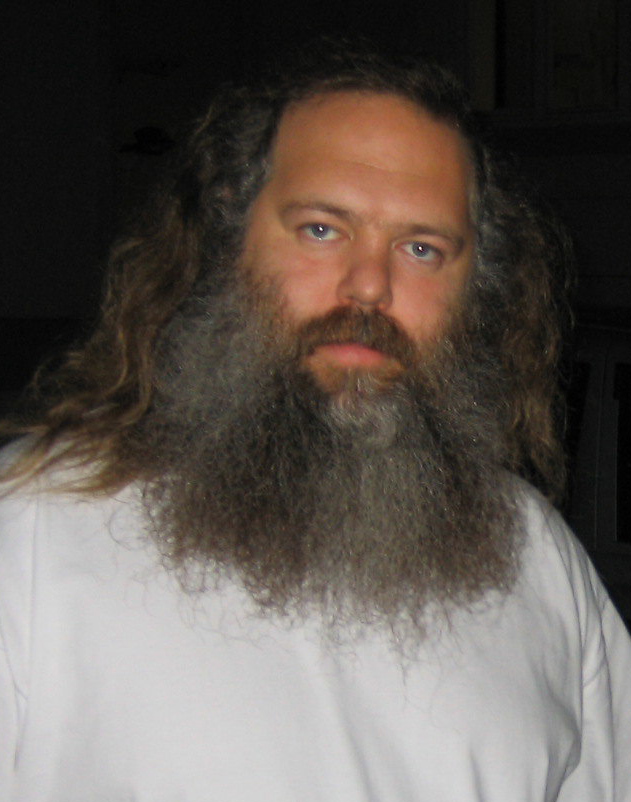
- Rubin in 2006

Background information
- Also known as: DJ Double R; The Loudness King
- Born: Frederick Jay Rubin; March 10, 1963 (age 63); Long Beach, New York, U.S.
- Origin: Hempstead, New York, U.S.
- Education: New York University
- Genres: Hip-hop; rock; heavy metal; country; pop
- Occupations: Record producer; record executive
- Instruments: Guitar; drum machine
- Works: Production discography
- Years active: 1981–present
- Labels: Def Jam; American; Columbia; Warner Bros.

Frederick Jay "Rick" Rubin (/ˈruːbɪn/, ROO-bin; born March 10, 1963) is an American record producer. He is a co-founder of Def Jam Recordings, founder of American Recordings, and former co-president of Columbia Records.

Rubin helped popularize hip-hop by producing records for pioneering acts such as LL Cool J, the Beastie Boys, Run-DMC, Public Enemy and Geto Boys. He has also produced hit records for acts from a variety of other genres such as pop, heavy metal, hard rock, nu metal and country. His signature production style is stripped-down to the essentials, eschewing excessive reverb and sonic layering. He has been criticized for contributing to the loudness war by overusing compression and limiting, and mastering his tracks at very high levels.

In 2007, Rubin was called "the most important producer of the last 20 years" by MTV and was named on Time's 2007 list of the "100 Most Influential People in the World". In 2026, Rubin was inducted into the Rock and Roll Hall of Fame.

== Early life ==
Frederick Jay Rubin was born in Long Beach, New York, on March 10, 1963, the son of housewife Linda and shoe wholesaler Michael Rubin. He grew up in Lido Beach. While a student at Long Beach High School, Rubin befriended the school's audiovisual department director, who gave him a few lessons in guitar playing and songwriting. He then played in a band with three friends, performing at garage gigs and school shows until a teacher helped him create a punk band called the Pricks. Their biggest claim to fame was being thrown off the stage at CBGB after performing two songs due to brawling with hecklers. This turn of events was actually instigated by friends of the band who had been instructed to do so to get the show shut down and create a buzz.

== Career ==
=== Def Jam ===
Rubin founded Def Jam Recordings while studying film at New York University. He played guitar for the band Hose, which he formed and was influenced by San Francisco's Flipper. In 1982, a Hose track became Def Jam's first release, a 45 rpm 7" vinyl single in a brown paper bag, and no label. The band played in and around the NYC punk scene, toured the Midwest and California, and played with seminal hardcore bands like Meat Puppets, Hüsker Dü, Circle Jerks, Butthole Surfers, and Minor Threat, becoming friends with Fugazi frontman and Dischord Records owner Ian MacKaye. The band broke up in 1984 as Rubin's passion moved toward the NYC hip hop scene.

Having befriended Zulu Nation's DJ Jazzy Jay, Rubin began to learn about hip hop production. By 1983, the two had produced "It's Yours" for Bronx rapper T La Rock, and released it on Def Jam. Producer Arthur Baker helped to distribute the record worldwide on Baker's Streetwise Records in 1984. Jazzy Jay introduced Rubin to concert promoter/artist manager Russell Simmons in the Negril club, and Rubin explained he needed help getting Def Jam off the ground. Simmons and Rubin edged out Jazzy Jay and the official Def Jam record label was founded while Rubin was attending New York University in 1984. Its first release was LL Cool J's "I Need a Beat". Rubin went on to find more hip-hop acts outside the Bronx, Brooklyn, and Harlem, including rappers from Queens, Staten Island, and Long Island, which eventually led to Def Jam's signing of Public Enemy. Rubin was instrumental in pointing the members of the Beastie Boys away from their punk roots and into rap, resulting in Kate Schellenbach's departure from the group. The Beastie Boys' 1985 "Rock Hard"/"Party's Gettin' Rough"/"Beastie Groove" EP came out on the success of Rubin's production work with breakthrough act Run-DMC, of which previous recordings were produced by Simmons and Orange Krush's musician Larry Smith. His productions were characterized by occasionally fusing rap with heavy rock. Rubin tapped Adam Dubin and Ric Menello to co-direct the videos for the Beastie Boys' "(You Gotta) Fight for Your Right (To Party!)" and "No Sleep till Brooklyn", effectively launching the band's mainstream hip hop career.

It was the idea of Rubin's friend Sue Cummings, an editor at Spin magazine, to have Run-DMC and Aerosmith collaborate on a cover of Aerosmith's "Walk This Way". This 1986 production is often credited with both introducing rap hard rock to mainstream ears and revitalizing Aerosmith's career. In 1986, he worked with Aerosmith again on demos for their forthcoming album, but their collaboration ended early and resulted in only rough studio jams. In the same year, Rubin began his long musical partnership with Slayer, producing Reign in Blood, considered a classic of the heavy metal genre. This was his first work with a metal band.

In 1986, a Village Voice cover story called Rubin "the king of rap;" however, Rubin later said that Def Jam’s success was a collective effort with Russell Simmons and the label’s artists, and he felt the title overlooked their contributions.

In 1987, the Cult released its pivotal third album, Electric. Produced by Rubin, the album remains one of the Cult's trademark and classic works. Rubin worked with the Cult again on the 1992 single "The Witch". He is credited as music supervisor for the film Less than Zero and as the producer of its soundtrack. Rubin portrayed a character based on himself in the 1985 hip-hop motion picture Krush Groove, which was inspired by the early days of Simmons's career as an artist manager and music producer. He then directed and co-wrote (with Ric Menello) a second Run–DMC film, Tougher Than Leather in 1988.

In 1988, Rubin and Simmons went their separate ways after Rubin had a falling out with then Def Jam president Lyor Cohen. Rubin left for Los Angeles to start Def American Records, while Simmons remained at Def Jam in New York. In Los Angeles, Rubin signed a number of rock and heavy metal acts, including Danzig, Masters of Reality, the Four Horsemen, and Wolfsbane, as well as alternative rock group the Jesus and Mary Chain and stand-up comedian Andrew Dice Clay. Though Rubin's work at this time focused mainly on rock and metal, he still retained a close association with rap, signing the Geto Boys and continuing to work with Public Enemy, LL Cool J, and Run-DMC.

=== American Recordings ===
Rubin had originally given his new label the name "Def American Recordings". In 1993, he found that the word "def" had been accepted into the standardized dictionary and held an actual funeral for the word, complete with a casket, grave, celebrity mourners, and a eulogy by Al Sharpton. Def American became American Recordings. Rubin has said: "When advertisers and the fashion world co-opted the image of hippies, a group of the original hippies in San Francisco literally buried the image of the hippie. When 'def' went from street lingo to mainstream, it defeated its purpose."

The first major project on the renamed label was Johnny Cash's American Recordings (1994), a record including six cover songs and new material written by others for Cash at Rubin's request. The album was a critical and commercial success, and helped revive Cash's career after a fallow period. The formula was repeated for five more Cash albums: Unchained (on which Tom Petty and the Heartbreakers served as the backing band), Solitary Man, The Man Comes Around (the last album released before Cash's death), A Hundred Highways, and Ain't No Grave. The Man Comes Around earned a 2003 Grammy for Best Male Country Vocal Performance ("Give My Love to Rose") and a nomination for Best Country Collaboration with Vocals ("Bridge over Troubled Water" with Fiona Apple). Rubin introduced Cash to Nine Inch Nails' "Hurt", and the resulting cover version of it on The Man Comes Around became a defining song of Cash's later years. Rubin also produced two of Joe Strummer's final songs, "Long Shadow", a song Strummer wrote for Cash to record although he never did, and a cover of Bob Marley's "Redemption Song". Both were released on Strummer's final album, Streetcore, which was released after his death. Rubin also produced a version of "Redemption Song" with Strummer and Cash together, which was featured in Cash's posthumous box set, Unearthed.

Rubin has also produced a number of records with other artists, which were released on labels other than American. Arguably his biggest success as a producer came from working with the Red Hot Chili Peppers, with whom Rubin produced six studio albums from 1991 to 2011, and in 2022, starting with the band's fifth release, Blood Sugar Sex Magik, which launched the band to mainstream success thanks to the hit singles "Give It Away" and "Under the Bridge". Other albums include One Hot Minute, Californication, By the Way, Stadium Arcadium, I'm With You, Unlimited Love, and Return of the Dream Canteen. The eight albums with the Chili Peppers also spawned 14 number-one singles on the Billboard Alternative Songs chart, a record the band as of 2022 still holds. It also received various award nods including 16 Grammy nominations (with six wins), and a Producer of the Year Grammy award for 2006's Stadium Arcadium, which was also nominated for Album of the Year. The band has sold over 80 million albums worldwide, most of which are the Rubin-produced albums. Various members of the Chili Peppers have also been used on other projects by Rubin, John Frusciante featured on Johnny Cash and Chad Smith featured on the Chicks. After 24 years of working with Rubin, the band announced in late 2014 that it would be working with Danger Mouse on its 11th studio album. As previously mentioned, Rubin returned to the role of producer for the band's two albums released in 2022, seven months apart from one another: Unlimited Love and Return of the Dream Canteen. Again these two albums both featured no.1 singles on the Alternative Songs chart.

Rubin also produced Mick Jagger's 1993 Wandering Spirit album, Lords of Acid's 1994 Voodoo-U album, Tom Petty's 1994 Wildflowers, AC/DC's 1995 Ballbreaker, Donovan's 1996 Sutras, System of a Down's 1998 Self-titled album, and Metallica's 2008 Death Magnetic. In 2005, Rubin executive-produced Shakira's two-album project Fijación Oral, Vol. 1 and Oral Fixation, Vol. 2. He was to appear on the Talib Kweli's album Eardrum, Clipse's album Til the Casket Drops and Lil Jon's album Crunk Rock. Rubin also produced the Jay-Z track "99 Problems", and was featured in the song's video. He also worked with Eminem on the song and music video "Berzerk".

Rubin produced Black Sabbath's 2013 album 13 and Billy Corgan's comeback solo album Ogilala.

=== Universal Records ===
In 2003 Rubin produced the Mars Volta debut album De-Loused in the Comatorium.

=== Columbia ===
In May 2007, Rubin was named co-head of Columbia Records. He co-produced Linkin Park's 2007 album Minutes to Midnight with Mike Shinoda. Rubin and Shinoda have since co-produced the band's 2010 album A Thousand Suns and its 2012 release Living Things.

In 2007, Rubin won the Grammy Award for Producer of the Year, Non-Classical for his work with the Chicks, Michael Kranz, Red Hot Chili Peppers, U2, Green Day, and Johnny Cash released in 2006. Rubin won the award again in 2009, for production work for Metallica, Neil Diamond, Ours, Jakob Dylan, and Weezer in 2008.

In 2007 and 2012, Rubin won the Grammy Award for Album of the Year. The former was for his work on the Chicks album Taking the Long Way and the latter came for his contribution to Adele's album 21.

=== Post-Columbia ===
Rubin left Columbia in 2012, and revived the American Recordings imprint through a deal with Republic Records. The first albums released under this new deal were ZZ Top's La Futura and the Avett Brothers' The Carpenter.

Rubin attempted to record a cover album with Crosby, Stills & Nash in 2012, but the brief sessions were unsuccessful. Graham Nash called the sessions "irritable" and "not a great experience".

In July 2021, Rubin signed with Endeavor Content to further develop his home studio, Shangri-La Recording Studios.

=== Rock and Roll Hall of Fame induction ===
On November 14, 2026, Rubin was inducted into the Rock and Roll Hall of Fame where he received the Musical Excellence Award. To pay tribute, Red Hot Chili Peppers gave a special performance of their song "Give It Away" where they wore beards, wigs and sunglasses to look like Rubin.

== Other work ==
Rubin has a chapter giving advice in Tim Ferriss's book Tools of Titans, and often gives advice on creativity via his Instagram page.

In 2021 he co-starred in the six-part documentary miniseries McCartney 3, 2, 1 which explores the career of Paul McCartney.

Rubin's debut book, published on January 17, 2023, by Penguin Press, is The Creative Act: A Way of Being. It is a nonfiction work about creativity. He said, "I set out to write a book about what to do to make a great work of art. Instead, it revealed itself to be a book on how to be."

In 2023, he started hosting a podcast titled Tetragrammaton on Apple Podcasts, which mainly featured interviews.

In 2024, Rubin founded the Festival of the Sun in Italy, a yearly music and arts festival that includes live music by international artists, meditation sessions, culinary presentations and film screenings.

In 2025, Rubin wrote The Way of Code, a digital book based on Lao Tzu's Dao De Jin to promote vibe coding in collaboration with Anthropic.

In 2026, Rubin appeared in an advert for the cryptocurrency-based online-betting platform Polymarket during the FIFA World Cup.

== Production style ==
=== Praise ===
Rubin's biggest trademark as a producer has been a "stripped-down" sound, which involves eliminating production elements such as string sections, backup vocals, and reverb. But by the 2000s, Rubin's style included such elements, as noted in The Washington Post: "As the track reaches a crescendo and [Neil] Diamond's portentous baritone soars over a swelling string arrangement, Rubin leans back, as though floored by the emotional power of the song."

Of Rubin's production methods, Dan Charnas, a music journalist who worked as vice president of A&R (Artists & Repertoire) and marketing at American Recordings in the 1990s, said, "He's fantastic with sound and arrangements, and he's tremendous with artists. They love him. He shows them how to make it better, and he gets more honest and exciting performances out of people than anyone." Natalie Maines of the Chicks has praised his production methods, saying, "He has the ability and the patience to let music be discovered, not manufactured. Come to think of it, maybe he is a guru." Producer Dr. Dre has said that Rubin is "hands down, the dopest producer ever that anyone would ever want to be, ever".

Despite having never worked with Rubin, British band Muse praised him for his "hands off" approach to production and credited him as an influence on its first self-produced album, The Resistance. The album's lead single, "Uprising", was named UK Single of the Year at the 2010 Music Producers Guild Awards, and Muse frontman Matt Bellamy while accepting the award said, "I'd like to thank John Leckie for teaching us how to produce and Rick Rubin for teaching us how not to produce." The statement was initially interpreted as a criticism of Rubin, but Bellamy later clarified it was meant as a self-deprecating comment on the band's similarly "hands-off" attitude to production.

=== Criticism ===
In 2014, Slipknot frontman Corey Taylor said that he met Rubin only four times during the entire recording process of Vol. 3: (The Subliminal Verses), despite being charged very large amounts of money. He called Rubin "a shadow of the Rick Rubin that he was" and vowed to never work with him. Taylor expressed regret for those comments in 2016, and said he wanted to make amends with Rubin, attributing the friction to being "freshly sober [...] unsure of [himself]" and to never having previously worked with anyone whose methods were like Rubin's.

In 2019, when comparing Rubin to Greg Fidelman (who had recently produced Slipknot's album We Are Not Your Kind), Taylor again criticized Rubin for his absences from the studio due to other work commitments. He said that Rubin was nice, but "he just wasn't fucking there" and that the band did not see him more than once a week until they finished recording the vocals at his house.

In 2022, Black Sabbath bassist Geezer Butler recalled having mixed feelings on Rubin's work on the band's 2013 album 13. According to Butler, the first thing Rubin did was "He played us our very first album, and he said, 'Cast your mind back to then when there was no such thing as heavy metal or anything like that, and pretend it's the follow-up album to that,' which is a ridiculous thing to think." Butler also stated that vocalist Ozzy Osbourne and guitarist Tony Iommi had frustrations with Rubin's suggestions, as he did not explain his reasons.

==== Loudness war ====
Since at least 1999, listeners have criticized Rubin for contributing to a phenomenon in music known as the loudness war, in which the dynamic range of recorded music is compressed and sometimes clipped in order to increase the general loudness. Albums Rubin produced that have been criticized for such treatment include:

- Californication by the Red Hot Chili Peppers (1999) – Tim Anderson of The Guardian criticized it for excessive compression and distortion, and Stylus Magazine said it suffered from so much digital clipping that "even non-audiophile consumers complained about it".
- Death Magnetic by Metallica (2008) – a remixed/remastered version of the entire album was released as downloadable content for the video game Guitar Hero III: Legends of Rock. Songs that are used in rhythm games such as Guitar Hero and Rock Band are always remixed/remastered by the game studios; despite the fact that this edition of the album was released for gameplay instead of casual listening, fans have said that the mix of Death Magnetic found on the game is preferred because it consequently is not subject to the same level of compression as the official commercially released record.
- 13 by Black Sabbath (2013) – Ben Ratliff of The New York Times said that some believed Rubin "to be a prime offender in the recent history of highly compressed and loudly mastered music – a major cause of ear fatigue" Jon Hadusek of Consequence of Sound wrote, "Rubin ... deserves disparagement for the way he mixed the audio levels, which are crushed by distortion and compression. Otherwise well-recorded songs are blemished, an affliction all too pervasive in the modern music industry".

== Personal life ==
Rubin has practiced Buddhism and meditation since he was 14 years old. He also has a preference for going barefoot for spiritual reasons, a habit that earned him the nickname "barefoot sage".

Rubin lives in Malibu, California. He is married to Mourielle Hurtado Herrera, a former actress and model turned farmer. They have a son who was born in 2017.

Rubin was a vegan for over 20 years, but later began eating meat again. He is a fan of professional wrestling and held season tickets to WWE events at Madison Square Garden throughout the 1970s and 1980s. He has cited wrestlers Roddy Piper and Ric Flair as influences on his work, and has said that villainous wrestlers were hugely influential in the development of the Beastie Boys' public image. He financially backed wrestling promoter Jim Cornette's company Smoky Mountain Wrestling from 1991 to 1995.

Rubin lives part time with his family in Tuscany, Italy.

== Filmography ==
Year	Title	Role	Notes
1985	Krush Groove	Himself	Actor
1987	"(You Gotta) Fight for Your Right (To Party!)"	Himself	Beastie Boys music video
1987	"Rhymin & Stealin"	Himself	Beastie Boys music video
1988	Tougher Than Leather	Vic Ferrante	Writer, Director, Actor
1990	Men Don't Leave	Craig	actor
1991	Funky Monks	Himself	Documentary
2004	Fade to Black	Himself	Documentary
2004	"99 Problems"	Himself	Jay-Z music video
2005	"Twisted Transistor"	Himself	Korn music video
2006	Dixie Chicks: Shut Up and Sing	Himself	Documentary
2006	iTunes Originals – Red Hot Chili Peppers	Himself	Virtual album
2007	Runnin' Down a Dream	Himself	Documentary
2007	The Making of Minutes to Midnight	Himself	Documentary
2010	The Meeting of a Thousand Suns	Himself	Documentary
2012	Inside Living Things	Himself	Documentary
2013	Sound City	Himself	Documentary
2013	"Berzerk"	Himself	Eminem music video
2013	Making 13	Himself	Documentary
2014	Foo Fighters: Sonic Highways	Himself	Documentary series
2016	I Am Johnny Cash	Himself	Documentary
2017	Oh, Vita! Making an Album	Himself	Documentary
2017	May It Last: A Portrait of the Avett Brothers	Himself	Documentary
2017	"Seven Sticks of Dynamite"	Himself	Awolnation music video
2018	My Next Guest Needs No Introduction with David Letterman	Himself	1 episode
2019	Shangri-La	Himself	Documentary series
2021	McCartney 3, 2, 1	Himself	Documentary series
2021	Tom Petty, Somewhere You Feel Free	Himself	Documentary
2023	Circus Maximus	Himself	Actor
2026	In Transit: Part II	Himself	Short Documentary Film

== Published work ==
- Rick Rubin, The Creative Act: A Way of Being, Penguin Random House, 432 pages, ISBN 9780593652886, 2023

== See also ==
- List of Buddhists
- List of barefooters
