= Cornerstone (disambiguation) =

A cornerstone is a ceremonial masonry stone set in a prominent location on the outside of a building.

Cornerstone may also refer to:

== Companies and organizations ==
- Cornerstone (agency), a New York-based creative agency
- Cornerstone, an imprint of Random House UK
- Cornerstone (charity), a Scottish charity providing support and care for people with disabilities
- Cornerstone OnDemand Inc., an American cloud-based talent management software company
- Cornerstone Policy Research and its legislative action arm Cornerstone-Action, a U.S. political organization based in the state of New Hampshire
- Cornerstone Research, an economic and financial consulting firm in the United States
- Cornerstone Theater Company, a Los Angeles–based theater company
- Cornerstones F.C., a Ghanaian football club
- Cornerstone Church (disambiguation)
- Cornerstone Barristers
- Cornerstone (restaurant), a defunct restaurant in London, United Kingdom

== Music ==
- Cornerstone (Austrian band), AOR-group
- Cornerstone (Danish band), hard rock group
- Cornerstone Festival, an annual Christian rock and alternative music festival

=== Albums and EPs ===
- Cornerstone (Styx album), 1979
- Cornerstone (Holly Dunn album), 1987
- Cornerstone (Hillsong Worship album), a 2012 album by Hillsong
- Cornerstone EP, 2012 live EP by Hillsong Church
- Cornerstone EP, 2013 EP by Benjamin Clementine, or its title track
- Cornerstone (Richard X. Heyman album), 1998

=== Songs ===
- "Cornerstone" (song), the second single from the Arctic Monkeys' third album Humbug

== Religion ==
- Cornerstone (magazine), a magazine published by Jesus People USA in Chicago, Illinois, USA from 1971 to 2003
- Cornerstone Church (disambiguation)
- Cornerstone Community, an Australian Christian training and mission movement
- Cornerstone Television, a religious television network in the United States

== Schools ==
- Cornerstone Christian Academy (Bloomington, Illinois), Bloomington, Illinois
- Cornerstone Christian Academy (Ohio), Willoughby, Ohio
- Cornerstone University, a Christian university in Grand Rapids, MI

== Other ==
- Cornerstone (play), 1956 Australian play by Gwen Meredith
- Cornerstone (software), a relational database program released by Infocom in 1985
- Cornerstone Group, a grouping of socially-conservative Members of Parliament within the British Conservative Party
- Cornerstone (sculpture), a sculpture in Tanner Park, Southwark, London

== See also ==
- Foundation Stone in Jerusalem
- Dedication Stone, an Aztec monument
