= Martin Schirenc =

Austrian musician

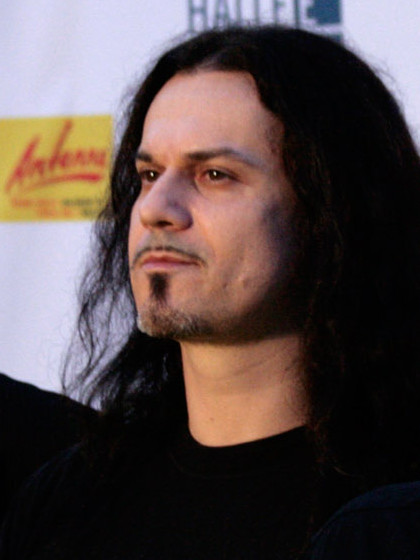
2009 photo

Martin Schirenc (born 18 December 1968 in Vienna) is an Austrian guitarist and vocalist, best known as a founder of death metal/grindcore band Pungent Stench and symphonic death metal band Hollenthon.

His former wife, Elena Schirenc, is a member and main lyricist of Hollenthon.

== Discography ==
=== With Pungent Stench ===
- For God Your Soul... For Me Your Flesh (1990)
- Been Caught Buttering (1991)
- Dirty Rhymes & Psychotronic Beats (1993)
- Club Mondo Bizarre - For Members Only (1994)
- Masters of Moral, Servants of Sin (2001)
- Ampeauty (2004)

=== With Hollenthon ===
- Domus Mundi (1999)
- With Vilest of Worms to Dwell (2001)
- Opus Magnum (2008)
- Tyrants and Wraiths (EP 2009)

=== With Fetish 69 ===
- Brute Force (1993)

=== With Kreuzweg Ost ===
- Iron Avantgarde (2000)

=== As a producer ===
- Miasma - Changes
- Pazuzu - Awaken the Dragon
- A.B.M.S. - Norici Obscura Pars
- Golden Dawn - The Art of Dreaming
- Raventhrone - Malice in Wonderland
- Raventhrone - Endless Conflict Theorem
- Flatliners - Vampires
- Flatliners - Pandemonium
- Devlin - Grand Death Opening
- Diabolicum - The Dark Blood Rising
- Disastrous Murmur - Marinate Your Meat
- Transilvanian Beat Club - Willkommen Im Club
- Transilvanian Beat Club - Das Leben Soll Doch Schön Sein
- Collapse 7 - In Deep Silence
- Collapse 7 - Supernova Overdrive
- UCK Grind - Justice
- Bruckmayr - A Little Warning from the Pimps
- Glare of the Sun - Soil
- Glare of the Sun - Theia

== Guest ==
Vocals

- 2001: Diabolicum - Supernova Overdrive (on album The Dark Blood Rising The Hatecrowned Retaliation)
- 2002: Devlin - Divinity (on album Grand Death Opening)
- 2007: Collapse 7 - I Proclaim the End (on album Supernova Overdrive)
- 2007: UCK Grind - Corruption (as Don Cochino, on EP Justice)
- 2011: Zombie Inc. - A Dreadful Decease
- 2013: Zombie Inc. - Homo Gusticus
- 2018: Eisregen Mein Eichensarg (as Schirenc plays Eisregen, on Satan Liebt dich)

Flute

- Eisregen - Flötenfreunde

Guitars

- 1993: Fetish 69 - Brute Force
- 2006: Transilvanian Beat Club - Willkommen im Club (as El Cochino)
- 2007: Transilvanian Beat Club - Das Leben soll doch schön sein..., schwarze Katze, Road to Transilvaningen Hell, Die traurige Wahrheit über Werwölfe & Excess Deluxe (as El Cochino, on album Das Leben soll doch schön sein)
- 2007: Collapse 7 - Cold Fact Tomorrow (on album Supernova Overdrive)
- 2010: Dr. Heathen Scum - The Pungent Stench Sessions
- 2012: Golden Dawn - Return to Provenance
- 2013: Eisregen - DSDSL: Deutschland sucht die Superleiche (on album Todestage)
- 2015: Vegas Rhythm Kings - God of Surgical Steel (on album Another Dead Hooker...)
- 2017: Eisregen - Fleischfilm
- 2023: Eisregen - Gegengift

Synths

- 2017: Theotoxin - Atramentvm
