= Music of Austria =

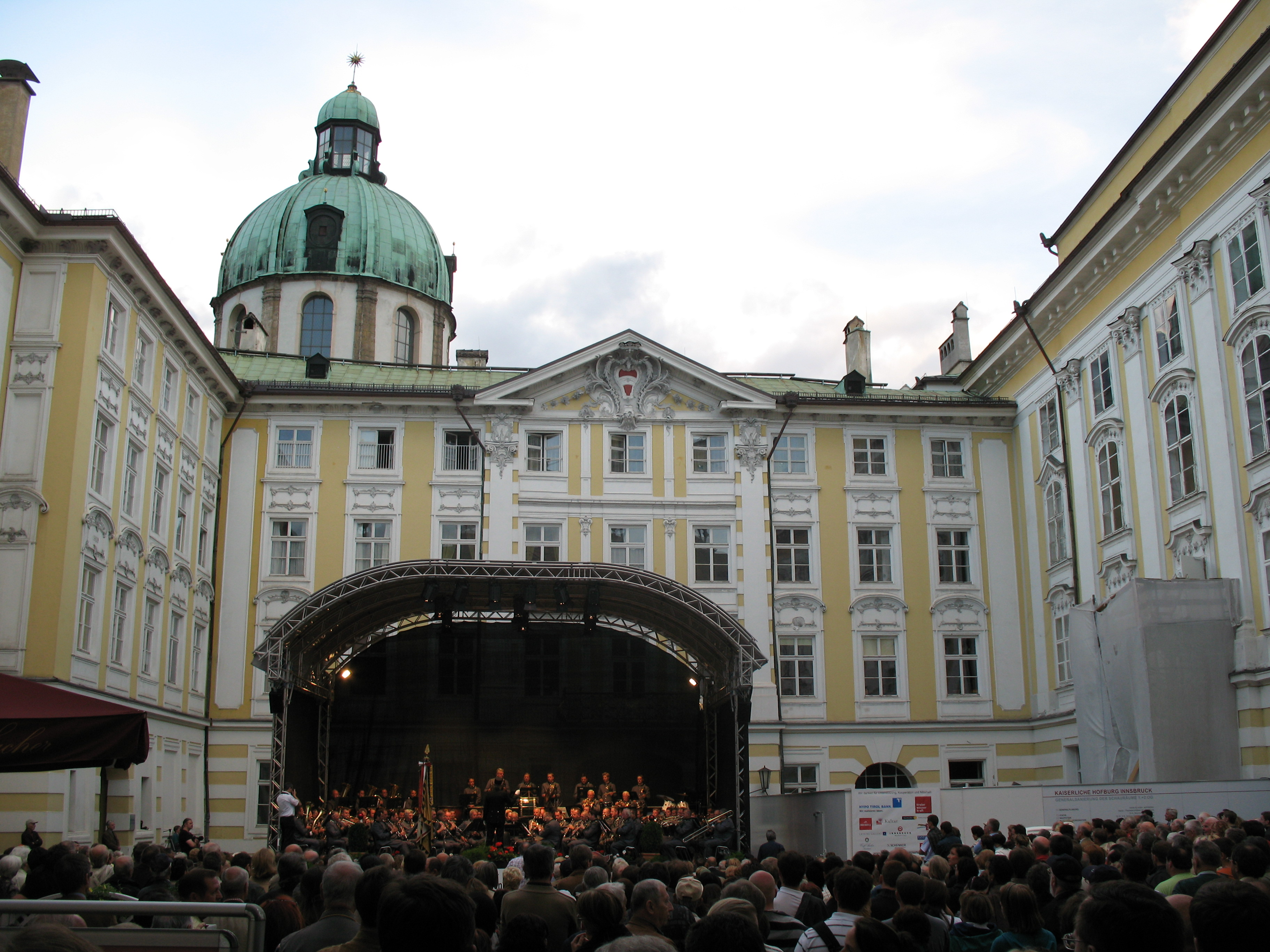
A band performing music at the Imperial Palace, Innsbruck

Vienna has been an important center of musical innovation. 18th- and 19th-century composers were drawn to the city due to the patronage of the Habsburgs, and made Vienna the European capital of classical music. Joseph Haydn, Wolfgang Amadeus Mozart, Ludwig van Beethoven, Franz Schubert, Johannes Brahms and Johann Strauss II, among others, were associated with the city, with Schubert being born in Vienna. During the Baroque period, Slavic and Hungarian folk forms influenced Austrian music. Vienna's status began its rise as a cultural center in the early 16th century, and was focused on instruments including the lute.

== Yodel ==
Yodeling, a form of singing that involves rapid and repeated changes of register, was developed in the Alps. What Austria called it was "juchizn".

== Rock and pop music ==
Falco was the most popular Austrian solo artist throughout the 1980s. His song "Rock Me Amadeus" reached number one of the Billboard Hot 100 in 1986. His sudden death in 1998 in the Dominican Republic catapulted his music from the 1980s once again into the spotlight.

Although Austria is not exactly the biggest exporter of international rock and pop-bands, there are a few notable musicians and bands. Opus also made it in the charts worldwide as well. In the last few years, several music groups toured Europe and had commercial success in the international charts. The most prominent being Christina Stürmer. SheSays, who supported Bryan Adams on his European tour and some other bands like Cornerstone, are notable for their recent contributions. The bands Wanda and Bilderbuch became successful in the 2010s. Soap&Skin has found international recognition as well, being known for her contributions to the score of the Netflix-series Dark, among other things.

Blackened death metal trio Belphegor currently leads the Austrian metal scene, which also includes Hollenthon, Pungent Stench, Abigor, Disharmonic Orchestra, Visions of Atlantis, Dornenreich, Summoning and Estatic Fear.

Christian Fennesz is an Austrian electronic musician. Other electronic musicians who call Austria home include Der Blutharsch, active in the Neofolk scene, as are Sturmpercht.

Drummer Thomas Lang was born in Vienna in 1967, and has played with artists such as Robert Fripp, Geri Halliwell and Robbie Williams.

One of the few international touring bands is Killed By 9V Batteries and Gasmac Gilmore from Vienna.

Yearly the Waves Vienna Music Festival & Conference takes place in October. This festival is a showcase festival for European pop music acts.

== Classical music ==
The Vienna Philharmonic is a classical music ensemble and tours throughout the year all over the world. Their New Year's Day concert held in Vienna every year in the Musikverein is one of Europe's most important classical concerts during the year.

== Electronic music ==
There is a vital electronic music scene in Austria. Groups and artists include Parov Stelar, Bernhard Fleischmann, Kruder and Dorfmeister and Elektro Guzzi. Drum 'n' Bass also has a large reputation, with internationally successful Artists like Camo & Krooked, Disaszt, Ill.Skillz and Mefjus.

== Neue Deutsche Härte ==
Neue Deutsche Härte (New German Hardness) is most popular in Austria and the rest of the German Sprachraum. Notable bands include Stahlhammer and L'Âme Immortelle, both of which have had some international success. The German band Samsas Traum is now based in Austria as well.

== Eurovision success ==
In 2014, Conchita Wurst won the Eurovision Song Contest representing Austria. Conchita Wurst is a drag queen portrayed by Thomas "Tom" Neuwirth, which sparked some controversy. Following the win, the 60th anniversary Eurovision was held in Vienna in 2015. This was the second Eurovision contest to be held in Austria, first one being in 1967, after the winning performance Merci, Chérie by Udo Jürgens.

Austria won the Eurovision Song Contest a third time in 2025 with the song "Wasted Love" by Viennese opera singer JJ and then hosted the Eurovision Song Contest 2026 in Vienna.

== Other musicians ==
Other commercially successful musicians are:

- Wolfgang Ambros, Rainhard Fendrich, Georg Danzer, S.T.S., Erste Allgemeine Verunsicherung, Willi Resetarits, Hubert von Goisern, Papermoon, Seiler und Speer, Pizzera & Jaus
- Rap: RAF Camora
- Schlager, Volkstümliche Musik: Andreas Gabalier, Melissa Naschenweng, DJ Ötzi, Hansi Hinterseer, Die Seer, Nockis (previously: Nockalm Quintett)
- Choirs: Vienna Boys' Choir, The Cistercian Monks of Stift Heiligenkreuz

== See also ==
- Austrian folk dance
- Ländler
- List of Austrians in music
- Music of Vienna
- Music of Innsbruck
- Schlager music#Germany and Austria
