= Warning (German band) =

German electronic music band

- Origin: Hamburg, Germany
- Genres: Industrial; EBM; electronic; electropunk; neue deutsche welle
- Years active: 1982–83
- Label: Vertigo Records
- Past members: Edgar Schlepper; Hans Müller

Warning was a German electronic music band founded in 1982. They are best known for their 1982 single "Why Can the Bodies Fly", which was featured in a 1983 episode of the TV series Tatort.

== History ==
Edgar Schlepper, owner of a music store, and Hans Müller, who worked for a record label, created several songs during a joint jam session on a guitar synthesizer, which were compiled on their debut album Warning in 1982. The two musicians used the pseudonyms Ed Vanguard (Schlepper) and Mike Yonder (Müller).

The recordings for the album were performed by the former Rattles drummer Dicky Tarrach, while the background vocals came from two former singers of the Les Humphries Singers. The lyrics for "Why Can the Bodies Fly" were written by the Spaniard Ines Gaim, while the other lyrics were written by Jürgen Barz. Schlepper and Müller presented themselves on the album cover wearing masks like Darth Vader.

The song "Why Can the Bodies Fly" caught the attention of director Wolfgang Becker while he was on vacation due to his morbid mood, so he added it to the soundtrack of a 1983 episode of the TV series Tatort, "Peggy hat Angst". In the film, the offender (portrayed by Hans-Georg Panczak) plays the song in stressful situations before each murder that he commits.

"Why Can the Bodies Fly" reached number 11 in the German and 17th place in the Austrian single charts and remained the only hit of the duo. Edgar Schlepper later produced radio plays. Hans Müller died in 2004 of cancer, Edgar Schlepper died in 2015.

"Why Can the Bodies Fly" was covered by the Austrian death metal band Pungent Stench on the 1993 EP Dirty Rhymes & Psychotronic Beats.

"Darkness" was covered by the German death metal band Morgoth on their first full length album Cursed.

== Discography ==
=== Albums ===
- Warning (1982)
- Electric Eyes (1983)

=== Singles ===
- "Why Can the Bodies Fly" b/w "In Crowd" (1982)
- "Journey to the Other Side" b/w "Warning" (1983)
