= Anthony Hidden =

English barrister and judge (1936–2016)

Sir Anthony Hidden
- Born: 7 March 1936
- Died: 19 February 2016 (aged 79)
- Occupation: Queen's Counsel
- Years active: 1961–2000
- Notable work: Hidden Report into the Clapham Junction rail crash

Sir Anthony Brian Hidden (7 March 1936 – 19 February 2016) was a British barrister and judge, known for chairing the enquiry into the 1988 Clapham Junction rail crash.

== Biography ==
Anthony Hidden was educated at Reigate Grammar School becoming head boy in 1954, and graduated from Emmanuel College, Cambridge in 1957. He served with the Royal Tank Regiment, and was called to the Bar 1961. He was made a Queen's counsel in 1976, appointed as a recorder in 1977, and for four years served as presiding judge on the South-East circuit.

Anthony Hidden was a member of the Cornerstone Barristers practice. He acted as prosecuting counsel in the trial of Lester Piggott for tax evasion. He was appointed a High Court Judge in 1989, and received a knighthood in the same year. An early controversial case in which he presided was to ascertain whether compensation for post-traumatic stress disorder should be awarded to individuals who witnessed on television their relatives in distressed states during the Hillsborough disaster. Hidden ruled for the claimants, but the finding was reversed upon appeals at the Court of Appeal and the House of Lords.

He suffered a stroke in 2000, and after a later second stroke was confined to a nursing home for the last ten years of his life.

=== Clapham Junction rail crash enquiry ===
At the invitation of Paul Channon, the Secretary of State for Transport, Hidden chaired an enquiry into the causes of the 12 December 1988 Clapham Junction rail crash, in which 35 people died and nearly 500 were injured. He won praise for his unrelenting approach throughout the 56-day hearing, and for the thoroughness of his report. The enquiry report (known as the Hidden Report) made 93 recommendations for safety and other improvements, including the adoption of the Automatic Train Protection system. Although his recommendations led to major improvements in rail safety and safety culture in the UK, equally, a number of the recommendations – including ATP, on-train data recorders and cab radios – were not acted on, or implemented only after great delay or partially.
