= Hollenthon =

Austrian heavy metal band

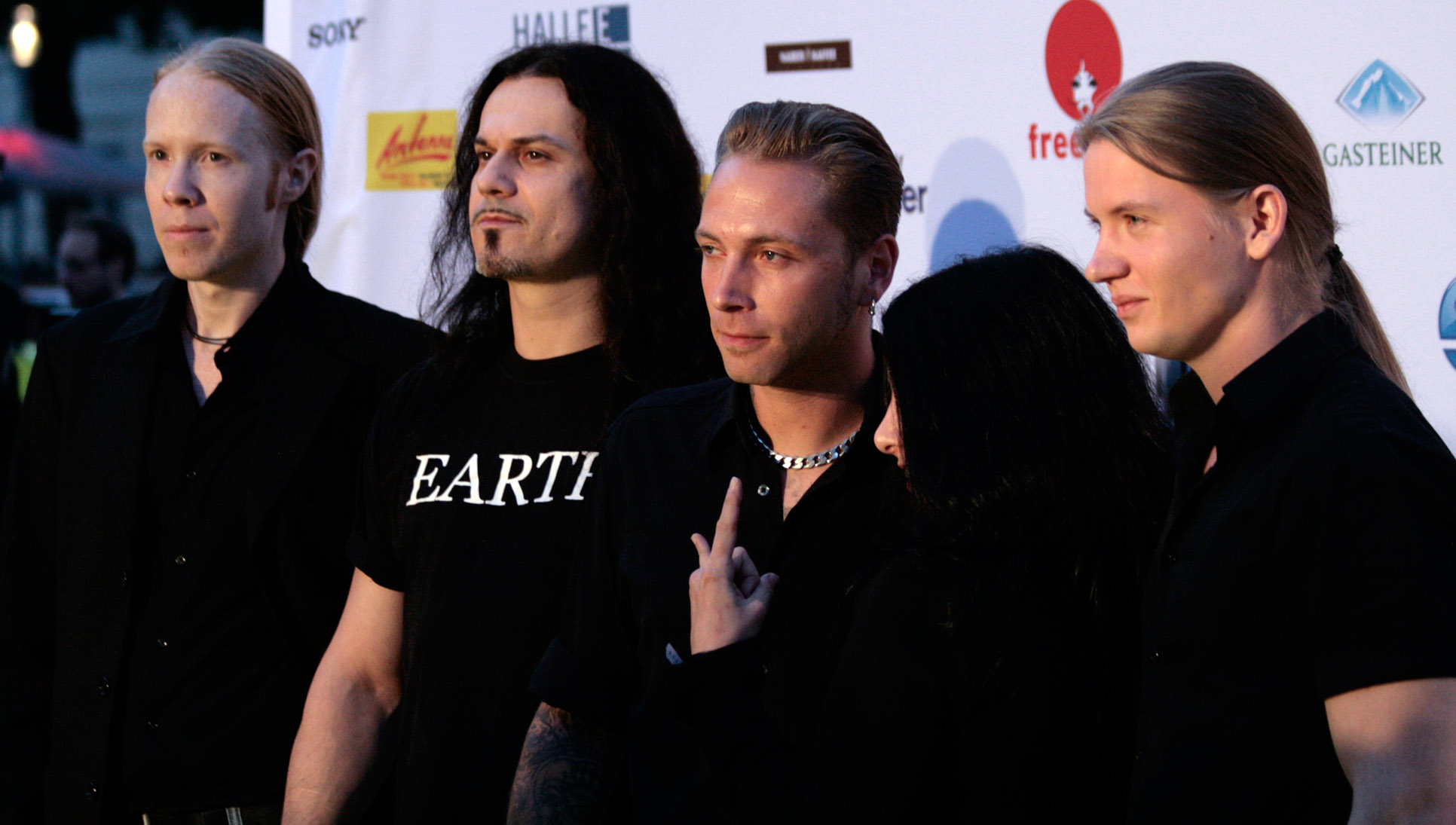
- Hollenthon at the Amadeus Austrian Music Award (Museumsquartier, Vienna), 10 September, 2009

Background information
- Origin: Austria
- Genres: Melodic death metal, symphonic metal, symphonic black metal
- Years active: 1994–present
- Label: Napalm Records
- Members: Martin Schirenc; Mike Gröger; Gregor Marboe; Martin Arzberger; Elena Schirenc
- Website: http://www.hollenthon.com

Hollenthon is a heavy metal band from Austria founded in 1994.

== History ==
The beginnings of Hollenthon date back to 1994, a time of an active Austrian Black Metal Syndicate and an incognito project known as Vuzem. He joined forces with drummer Mike Gröger (Collapse 7, Bloo Vodoo, Only Attitude Counts, Mudbreed). At the urging of A.B.M.S. members, Martin Schirenc anonymously included two Vuzem tracks on self-produced compilation Norici Obscura Pars.

Following favorable reviews and multiple requests, Martin decided to release a full-length recording of Vuzem's music. Other commitments, however, delayed the realization of this endeavor until late 1998, when unfinished material was brought to the attention of Napalm Records. Shortly thereafter, Vuzem signed to the label, releasing critically acclaimed debut Domus Mundi in 1999 under the Hollenthon banner.

In June 2001, Hollenthon released With Vilest of Worms to Dwell. Not unlike its predecessor, it boasted a superb soundtrack-like production, as well as a fierce and wicked atmosphere created by a perfect symbiosis of heavy guitars, symphonic interludes, thrilling choirs, and bewitching melodies with samples from classical composers like i.e. Sergei Prokofiev ("Montagues and Capulets" from Romeo and Juliet in "Lords of Bedlam").

The album was promoted with a European tour together with Eisregen (GER) and Siebenbürgen (SWE). The live line up was completed with Mike's bandmates Mario Klausner (Collapse 7, Ex-Pungent Stench, Ex-Belphegor) and Werner Freinbichler (Collapse 7). The following years saw Martin concentrating on Pungent Stench although the writing of new material was never stopped. 2007 Hollenthon intended to return and continue to walk the chosen path. Wanting a real band and not just additional live musicians Martin and Mike chose to recruit Gregor Marboe, who Martin shared stages with since early 2006 in Pungent Stench on bass and backing vocals and who has been active in the Austrian scene for years in his bands Defender Kfs and Vargsriket. In need of a second guitarist Martin Arzberger (Molokh, Defender Kfs) was introduced to the band.

== Line-up ==
- Martin Schirenc – vocals, guitar, bass, and keyboards
- Mike Gröger – drums and percussion
- Max Reif – Bass (2010-)
- Martin Arzberger – guitars (2007-)
- Elena Schirenc – session vocals, lyrics (1999-)

=== Former members ===
- Gregor Marboe – Bass, vocals (2007–2010)

== Discography ==
- Domus Mundi (1999)
- With Vilest of Worms to Dwell (2001)
- Opus Magnum (2008)
- Tyrants and Wraiths (EP, 2009)
