= For God Your Soul... For Me Your Flesh =

Studio album by Pungent Stench
- Released: April 9, 1990
- Recorded: December 1989, Masterplan Studios (West Germany)
- Genre: Death metal
- Length: 41:39
- Label: Nuclear Blast
- Producer: Pungent Stench, Gregor Znort, Stephan Grujic

Pungent Stench chronology
Extreme Deformity (1989)	For God Your Soul... For Me Your Flesh (1990)	Been Caught Buttering (1991)

Professional ratings
Review scores
Source	Rating
Allmusic	link

For God Your Soul... For Me Your Flesh is the debut album of the Austrian death metal band Pungent Stench. It was originally released in 1990 on Nuclear Blast. The original CD pressing came with ten bonus track off the split LP with Disharmonic Orchestra and the Extreme Deformity EP. The lyrics mostly deal with cannibalism and are often tongue-in-cheek.

== Album Information ==
For God Your Soul... For Me Your Flesh was originally released in 1990 with cover art done by Joel-Peter Witkin titled “Poet: From A Collection Of Relics and Ornaments,” The CD also had several bonus tracks taken from various recordings from 1989. This album was reissued in 1993 with alternate artwork, different mastering & 3 re recorded songs due to lost master tapes. This album was excluded from the 2001 Nuclear Blast reissues to coincide with the release of their album Masters of Moral, Servants of Sin. In 2018 both the 1990 master & the 1993 remaster were packaged in a double CD digipak with the classic art reinstated & with bonus tracks by Dissonance Productions

== Track listing ==
No.	Title	Length
1.	"Intro / Extreme Deformity"	4:51
2.	"Hypnos"	3:09
3.	"For God Your Soul... for Me Your Flesh"	7:05
4.	"Just Let Me Rot"	3:47
5.	"Pungent Stench"	2:34
6.	"Bonesawer"	3:39
7.	"Embalmed In Sulphuric Acid" (Rerecorded for the 1993 Reissue)	2:07
8.	"Blood, Pus and Gastric Juice" (Rerecorded for the 1993 Reissue)	4:26
9.	"Suspended Animation" (Rerecorded for the 1993 Reissue)	4:18
10.	"A Small Lunch"	5:43
Total length:		41:39

First Pressing Bonus Tracks (CD Only)
No.	Title	Length
11.	"Pulsating Protoplasma"	2:51
12.	"Dead Body Love"	3:59
13.	"Miscarriage"	2:19
14.	"In The Vault"	2:59
15.	"Rip You Without Care"	3:40
16.	"Festered Offals"	2:54
17.	"Pungent Stench"	2:21
18.	"Extreme Deformity"	4:04
19.	"Mucous Secretion"	2:52
20.	"Molecular Disembowlment"	5:26
Total length:		01:14:59

== Personnel ==
Pungent Stench

- Martin Schirenc – guitar, vocals
- Jacek Perkowski – bass
- Alex Wank – drums

Credits

- Stephan Grujic - Producer, Engineering
- Don Cochino (Martin Schirenc) - Artwork, Calligraphy
- Joel Peter Witkin - Artwork, Photography
- Gregor Znord - Engineering, Producer
- Eva Kern - Photography
