= Tyrants and Wraiths =

EP by Hollenthon
- Released: 2009
- Studio: Vato Loco Studio
- Genre: Symphonic death metal
- Label: Napalm Records
- Producer: Martin Schirenc

Hollenthon chronology
Opus Magnum (2008)	Tyrants and Wraiths (2009)

Tyrants and Wraiths is an EP by Austrian melodic death metal band Hollenthon, released by Napalm Records in 2009. It features bonus videos of "On the Wings of a Dove" and "Ars Moriendi" live at Graspop Metal Meeting.

== Track listing ==
- All songs written and arranged by Hollenthon. Lyrics by Elena Schirenc
1. "Tyrants and Wraiths" – 5:26
2. "Innocent Sin" – 4:22
3. "Deathly Dirges" – 5:28
4. "Of Hollow Men" – 7:30

Bonus Videos
No.	Title	Length
1.	"On the Wings of a Dove" (Graspop Metal Meeting, 2008)	6:09
2.	"Ars Moriendi" (Graspop Metal Meeting, 2008)	5:37

== Personnel ==
- Martin Schirenc - Guitar, Vocals
- Martin Arzberger - Guitar
- Gregor Marboe - Bass, Vocals
- Mike Gröge - Drums
- Martin Schirenc - producer, recording. engineer, mixing
