= Cornerstone Church =

Cornerstone Church may refer to:

- Christ the Cornerstone Church, Milton Keynes, UK
- Cornerstone Church (Toledo), United States
- Cornerstone Church (Nottingham), UK
- Cornerstone Church of Ames, Iowa, United States
- Cornerstone Church of San Diego, United States
- Cornerstone Community Church, Singapore
- Cornerstone Church (Nashville), United States
