= Praise the Names of the Musical Assassins =

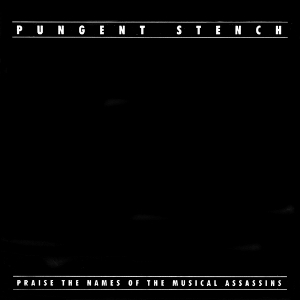

Compilation album by Pungent Stench
- Released: 1997
- Recorded: April 1988 – October 1993
- Genre: Death metal
- Length: 69:12
- Label: Nuclear Blast

Pungent Stench chronology
Club Mondo Bizarre - For Members Only (1994)	Praise the Names of the Musical Assassins (1997)	Masters of Moral, Servants of Sin (2001)

Professional ratings
Review scores
Source	Rating
Allmusic	3/5 stars
Chronicles of Chaos	(9/10)

Praise the Names of the Musical Assassins is a compilation album of "rare and unreleased material" by Austrian death metal band Pungent Stench. It was originally released in 1997 through Nuclear Blast, two years after the band had split-up. The album, "which collected all the rare and unreleased Pungent Stench material available," contains tracks from the band's early demo tapes, Mucous Secretion, and Extreme Deformity, which was released as the group's first EP in 1989. These "infamous" demos, along with a split-LP with Disharmonic Orchestra, caused a considerable amount of interest in the group, eventually leading them to sign a record deal with German label Nuclear Blast.

The compilation comes in special packaging, which consists of a black box with the CD and a 24-page booklet containing all of Pungent Stench's releases, live shows and photos of the band that were taken from around the world. By this package, Jason Birchmeier of Allmusic praised the release stating, "Well packaged, Praise the Names of the Musical Assassins effectively sums up the group's early days when they were strictly a 'brutal splatter metal' group, before they would eventually slow down their music and write songs about sex rather than gore." Birchmeier also defined Praise the Names of the Musical Assassins as a "suitable retrospective for one of the most notorious death metal bands of the 1990s."

Adam Wasylyk of Chronicles of Chaos webzine, gave the album a rating of 9 out of 10, stating that "Praise the Names of the Musical Assassins is composed of hard-to-find, rare and compilation tracks to serve almost as a 'best of,' a quality remembrance to one of Nuclear Blast's better bands."

== Track listing ==
All songs were written by Pungent Stench.

1. "Pulsating Protoplasma" – 2:51
2. "Dead Body Love" – 4:00
3. "Miscarriage" – 2:20
4. "In the Vault" – 3:00
5. "Rip You without Care" – 3:40
6. "Festered Offals" – 2:54
7. "Pungent Stench" – 2:20
8. "Extreme Deformity" – 4:05
9. "Mucous Secretion" – 2:53
10. "Molecular Disembowelment" – 5:26
11. "The Ballad of the Mangled Homeboys" – 3:30
12. "Daddy Cruel" – 3:32
13. "Tony" – 4:05
14. "Madcatmachopsychoromantik" – 9:15
15. "Extreme Deformity" – 5:15
16. "Festered Offals" – 2:59
17. "Pulsating Protoplasma" – 2:41
18. "Pungent Stench" – 2:28
19. "Embalmed in Sulphuric Acid" – 1:58

Tracks 1–5 were taken from the split-LP with Disharmonic Orchestra; tracks 8–10 were taken from the Extreme Deformity 7-inch EP; tracks 6–7 and 11–14 were taken from various compilation appearances; tracks 15–19 were taken from the Mucous Secretion demo.
