= Hexenhaus (album) =

EP by Eisregen
- Released: 28 October 2005
- Genre: Dark metal
- Length: 35:01 (CD); 2:00:35 (DVD)
- Label: Massacre Records

Eisregen chronology
Wundwasser (2004)	Hexenhaus (2005)	Blutbahnen (2007)

Hexenhaus is a combined extended play and DVD by the German dark metal band Eisregen, released in 2005 by Massacre Records.

== Track listing ==
CD

1. "Elektro-Hexe" – 3:17
2. "Kaltwassergrab" – 4:28
3. "In der Grube 2005" – 3:21
4. "1000 tote Nutten" – 6:05
5. "Lili Marleen" (cover) – 4:10
6. "Westwärts – 5:07
7. "Thüringen 2005 – 4:54
8. "Die wahre Elektro-Hexe" – 3:39

DVD

1. "Elektro-Hexe" (music video) – 5:46
2. "Making of the Hexe" – 1:23:06
3. "Studioreport" – 9:28
4. "Live in der Quelle" – 22:15
