= Opus Magnum (album) =

Studio album by Hollenthon
- Released: 30 May 2008
- Recorded: Vato Loco Studio, Vienna, Austria
- Genre: Symphonic death metal
- Length: 46:17
- Label: Napalm
- Producer: Martin Schirenc

Hollenthon chronology
With Vilest of Worms to Dwell (2001)	Opus Magnum (2008)	Tyrants and Wraiths (2009)

Professional ratings
Review scores
Source	Rating
Metal Storm	8/10 stars
Sputnikmusic	2/5 stars
About.com	4/5 stars
Metal.de	7/10 stars

Opus Magnum is the third studio album by Austrian melodic death metal band Hollenthon, released by Napalm Records in 2008. Limited edition digipack contains bonus track, "The Bazaar" (originally performed by The Tea Party) and video clip for "Son of Perdition".

== Track listing ==
Music by Martin Schirenc, lyrics by Elena Schirenc, except "The Bazaar" by Jeff Martin, Stuart Chatwood and Jeff Burrows

1. "On the Wings of a Dove" – 5:00
2. "To Fabled Lands" – 5:53
3. "Son of Perdition" – 4:52
4. "Ars Moriendi" – 5:33
5. "Once We Were Kings" – 4:50
6. "Of Splendid Worlds" – 6:08
7. "Dying Embers" – 5:28
8. "Misterium Babel" – 7:30
9. "The Bazaar" – 4:28 (The Tea Party cover, bonus track)

== Personnel ==
=== Hollenthon ===
- Martin Schirenc - vocals, guitars, keyboards, orchestration
- Martin Arzberger - guitars
- Gregor Marboe - bass, vocals
- Mike Gröger - drums, percussion
- Elena Schirenc - vocals

=== Production ===
- Produced, recorded, engineered & mixed By Martin Schirenc
