= Krebskolonie =

Studio album by Eisregen
- Released: 29 November 1998
- Genre: Black metal
- Length: 51:50
- Label: Last Episode

Eisregen chronology
Zerfall (1998)	Krebskolonie (1998)	Leichenlager (2000)

Krebskolonie is the second studio album by the German metal band Eisregen. It was released on 29 November 1998 through the label Last Episode.

In August 2003, the album was added to the List of Media Harmful to Young People by the German Federal Review Board for Media Harmful to Minors. The album was added to the Liste B because the review committee saw a strong risk to young people and a violation of § 131 StGB (depiction of violence). The justification referred to tracks 2, 4, 7 and 9. This means that the album may no longer be distributed and the songs may no longer be played live until a court decision has been made.

In December 2023, the band had asked for a re-examination, it was decided that the album would remain on the List of Media Harmful to Young People because of track 9.

== Track listing ==
1. "Vorabend der Schlacht" – 6:26
2. "Nachtgeburt" – 1:57
3. "Scharlachrotes Kleid" – 5:27
4. "Krebskolonie" – 7:35
5. "Für Euch, die Ihr lebt " – 2:54
6. "Das kleine Leben" – 8:54
7. "Blass-blaue Lippen" – 4:15
8. "Abglanz vom Licht" – 5:37
9. "Futter für die Schweine" – 4:25
10. "Thüringen" – 4:20

== Credits ==
- Michael "Blutkehle" Roth − vocals
- Michael "Bursche" Lenz − guitar
- Daniel "DF" Fröbing – keyboard
- Theresa "2T" Trenks – violin
- Ronny "Yantit" Fimmel − drums

== Background ==
- Krebskolonie is called "Krabbenkolonie" by the band and several fans and is included as a bonus live album in the digipak version of Bühnenblut.

== Charts ==
Chart performance for Krebskolonie
Chart (2025)	Peak position
German Albums (Offizielle Top 100)	25
German Rock & Metal Albums (Offizielle Top 100)	11
