= Farbenfinsternis =

Studio album by Eisregen
- Released: 2001
- Genre: Black metal, gothic metal
- Length: 53:11
- Label: Last Episode

Eisregen chronology
Leichenlager (2000)	Farbenfinsternis (2001)	Wundwasser (2004)

Farbenfinsternis is the fourth studio album by the German metal band Eisregen, released in 2001 through the label Last Episode. The album has also a digipak version released in 2001 and it was rereleased in 2007 through German record label Massacre Records. The 2007 re-released version was in digipak format.

In February 2004, the album was added to the List of Media Harmful to Young People by the German Federal Review Board for Media Harmful to Minors. The justification referred to tracks 1–5, 9 and 10. This means that the album may only be sold to adults and the songs may only be played in front of adult audiences with age verification.

In December 2023, this restriction was lifted, because the band had asked for a re-examination.

== Track listing ==
1. "Meine tote russische Freundin" – 3:56
2. "Im Reich der Fleischlichkeit" – 4:48
3. "Deutschland in Flammen" – 4:08
4. "13" – 4:22
5. "Dein Blut" – 7:03
6. "Kap. 1: Vorboten" – 5:18
7. "Kap. 2: Angst wird Fleisch" – 5:44
8. "Kap. 3: Schatten im Verstand" – 4:23
9. "Kap. 4: Mein Reich komme" – 4:30
10. "Kap. 5: Farbenfinsternis" – 4:34
11. "Ein Jahr im Leben des Todes" – 4:25
12. "Born Dead" – 2:41

== Credits ==
- Michael "Blutkehle" Roth − vocals
- Michael "Bursche" Lenz − guitar
- Sebastian "Berg" Morbach − bass
- Theresa "2T" Trenks – violin
- Ronny "Yantit" Fimmel − drums
