= Werkraum =

German folk musician

- Origin: Germany
- Genres: Folk music, Electronic music, neofolk
- Years active: 1999–present
- Labels: Cold Spring Records (UK); Ahnstern/Steinklang (A); Bucranion (D)
- Members: Axel Frank

Werkraum is the creative music works of German musician Axel Frank.

== Overview ==
Frank released material on CDRs and multiple compilations in the late 1990s and early 2000s until debuting with a full-length LP on Cold Spring Records in 2004. In 2005 the release Kristalle, Werkraum's second album followed. With Early love Music in 2008, Werkraum receive a more and more worldwide recognition.

Frank was a member of the band Sturmpercht and played live fo bands like Triarii, Of The Wand And the Moon or Die Weisse Rose. He's also active under different monikers in different music genres and works as producer.

== Discography ==
=== Albums and EPs ===
Year	Title	Format, special notes
1999	Werkraum I	Album, CDR, Bucranion.
2000	Werkraum II	Album, CDR, Bucranion.
2004	Unsere Feuer brennen!	Album, CD, Cold Spring.
2005	Kristalle	Album, CD, Ahnstern/Steinklang.
2008	Early Love Music	Album, CD/2LP, Ahnstern/Steinklang.
2009	Unsere Feuer brennen!	Re-issue, CD, Cold Spring.
2014	The Lore Of Thy Great Fortune	Digital, Single, Bucranion.
2022	Unsere Feuer brennen!	Re-issue, LP, New Era Productions.
2024	Feat. SCP - Recognition Of The Innermost	Digital, E.P., Bucranion.
