= Clapham Junction rail crash =

1988 rail crash in London

Coordinates: 51.4571°N 0.1744°W

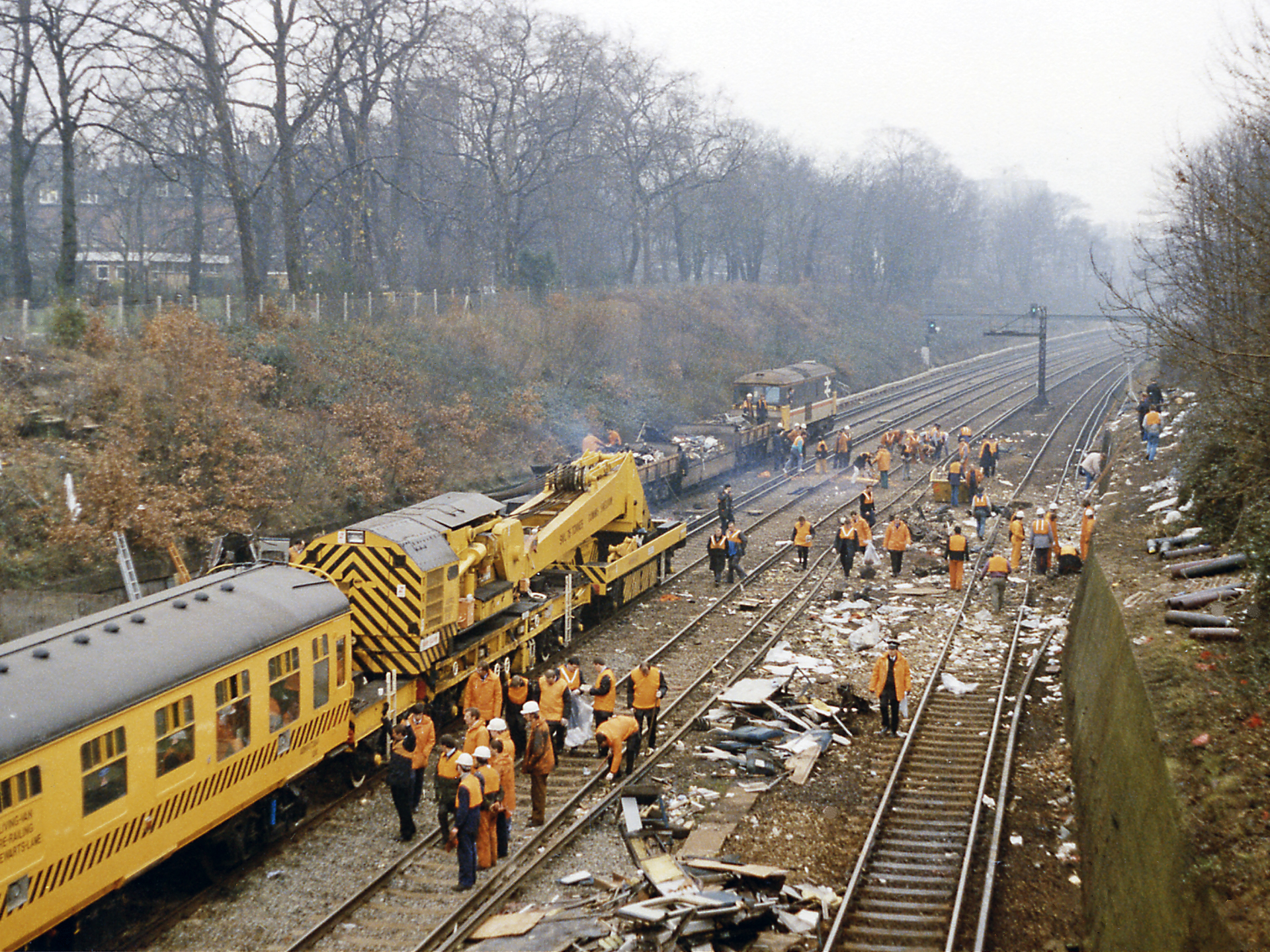
- View of the crash site and clean-up operations the day after the collision

Details
- Date: 12 December 1988; 37 years ago 08:10
- Location: near Clapham Junction, London, England
- Country: United Kingdom
- Line: South West Main Line
- Operator: Network SouthEast
- Cause: Unprotected wrong-side failure

Statistics
- Trains: 3
- Deaths: 35
- Injured: 69 serious, 415 minor, 484 total

The Clapham Junction rail crash occurred on the morning of 12 December 1988, when a crowded British Rail passenger train crashed into the rear of another train that had stopped at a signal just south of Clapham Junction railway station in London, England, and subsequently sideswiped an empty train travelling in the opposite direction. A total of 35 people died in the collision, while 484 were injured in what is Britain's seventh worst rail disaster in terms of death toll.

The collision was the result of a signal failure caused by a wiring fault. New wiring had been installed, but the old wiring had been left in place and not adequately secured. An independent inquiry chaired by Anthony Hidden, QC, found that the signalling technician responsible had not been told that his working practices were wrong, and his work had not been inspected by an independent person. He had also performed the work during his 13th consecutive seven-day workweek. Hidden was critical of the health and safety culture within British Rail at the time, and his recommendations included ensuring that work was independently inspected and that a senior project manager be made responsible for all aspects of any major, safety-critical project such as re-signalling work.

British Rail was fined £250,000 for violations of health and safety law in connection with the incident.

== Collisions ==
On 12 December 1988 the 07:18 from Basingstoke to London Waterloo, a crowded 12-car train made up of four-car 4VEP electric multiple units 3033, 3119 and 3005, was approaching Clapham Junction when the driver saw the signal ahead of him change from green ("proceed") to red ("danger"). Unable to stop at the signal, he stopped his train at the next signal and then reported to the signal box by means of a line-side telephone. He was told there was nothing wrong with the signal. Shortly after 08:10, the following train, the 06:30 from Bournemouth, made up of 4REP unit 2003 and 4TC units 8027 and 8015, collided with the Basingstoke train. A third train, carrying no passengers and comprising 4VEP units 3004 and 3425, was passing on the adjacent line in the other direction and collided with the wreckage immediately after the initial impact. The driver of a fourth train, coasting with no traction current, saw the other trains and managed to come to a stop behind the other two and the signal that should have protected them, which was showing a yellow "proceed with caution" aspect instead of a red "danger" aspect.

== Casualties ==
As a result of the collisions, 35 people died, and 69 were seriously injured. Another 415 sustained minor injuries. Twenty-two of the people killed were from Dorset and the New Forest, including the train driver John Rolls, who was from Bournemouth.

== Emergency response ==
The driver of the Basingstoke train was off his train and standing by the line-side telephone when his train was pushed forward several feet by the collision. He picked up the receiver and spoke to the signalman, informing him of the collision and asking him to call the emergency services. The signalman immediately switched all the signals he could to 'danger', and signalled to the adjacent signal boxes he had an obstruction on the line. He had no control over automatic signals, however, and was not able to stop the fourth train. He then called the Clapham Junction station manager and asked him to call the emergency services. The crash had tripped the high-voltage feed to the traction current. The operator in the nearby Raynes Park electrical control room suspected there had been a derailment and re-configured the supply so that the nearby Windsor line trains could still run.

Pupils and teachers from the adjacent Emanuel School, who were first on the scene of the disaster, were later commended for their service by Prime Minister Margaret Thatcher. Rescue was hampered because the railway was in a cutting, with a metal fence at the top and a wall at the bottom of a wooded slope. The last casualty was taken to hospital at 13:04 and the last body was removed at 15:45.

== Investigations ==
An initial internal investigation showed that a wiring fault meant that the signal would not show a red danger aspect when the track circuit immediately in front of the signal was occupied. Work associated with the Waterloo Area Resignalling Scheme meant new wiring had been installed, but the old wiring had been left connected at one end, and loose and uninsulated at the other.

An independent inquiry was chaired by Anthony Hidden, QC for the Department for Transport. His eventual report included 93 recommendations, for changes to the working practices of both British Rail and the emergency services.

A 1978 British Rail Southern Region report had concluded that due to the age of the equipment the re-signalling was needed by 1986. However, approval was given in 1984 after a report of three wrong-side signal failures. The re-signalling project had been planned assuming more people were available, but employees felt that the programme was inflexible and that they were under pressure to get the work done. Installation and testing was carried out at weekend during voluntary overtime, the technician having worked a seven-day week for the previous 13 weeks. The re-wiring had been done a few weeks previously, but the fault had only developed the previous day when equipment had been moved and the loose and uninsulated wire had created a false feed to a relay.

The signalling technician who had done the work had not cut back, insulated or tied back the loose wire, and his work had not been supervised or inspected by an independent person as was required. In particular, a wire count that would have identified that a wire had not been removed was not carried out. There had been inadequate training, assessment, supervision and testing and, with a lack of understanding of the risks of signalling failure, these were not monitored effectively.

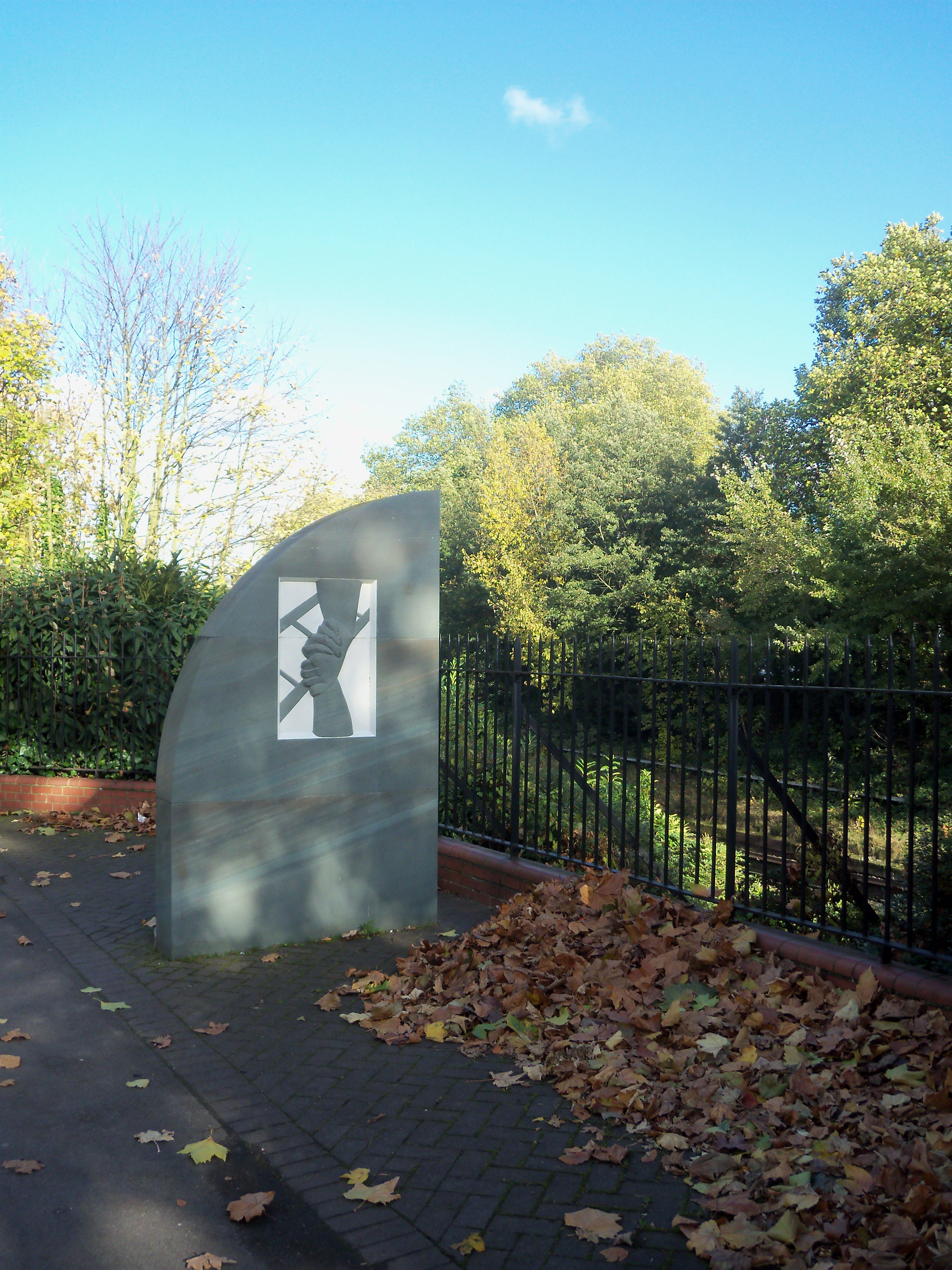
Memorial at the site of the crash, 2012

Critical of the health and safety culture within British Rail at the time, Hidden recommended that unused signal wires needed to be cut back and insulated, and that a testing plan be in place, with the inspection and testing being done by an independent person. Signal technicians needed to attend refresher courses every five years, and testers needed to be trained and certified. Management was to ensure that no one was working high levels of overtime, and a senior project manager made responsible for all aspects of the project. Unprotected wrong side signal failures – where the failure permitted a train to go beyond where it was permitted – had to be reported to the Railway Inspectorate. Cab radios, linking driver and signalman, were recommended, as was the installation of address system on existing trains that were not expected to be withdrawn within five years.

== Legacy ==
Testing was mandated on British Rail signalling work and the hours of work of employees involved in safety-critical work was limited. Although British Rail was fined £250,000 (equivalent to £575,000 in 2025) for breaches of the Health and Safety at Work etc. Act 1974, there was no prosecution for manslaughter. In 1996, the collision was one of the events cited by the Law Commission as reason for new laws on manslaughter, resulting in the Corporate Manslaughter and Corporate Homicide Act 2007.

A memorial marking the location of the crash site is at the top of the cutting above the railway on Spencer Park, Battersea.

The Basingstoke train stopped at the next signal after the faulty signal, in accordance with the rule book. Railway historian Adrian Vaughan suggests this may not be the best way of handling faulty signals. If the Basingstoke train had carried on to the signal following the next signal, the crash would not have happened because the Bournemouth train would have stopped at the signal where the crash occurred. As of 1999, the rule book had not been changed.

In 2017, a Rail Accident Investigation Branch report into a serious irregularity at Cardiff Central on 29 December 2016 revealed that some of the lessons from the Clapham Junction crash appeared to have been forgotten. In that incident, a pair of redundant points had been left in an unsafe condition and undetectable by the signalling system. The alertness of a driver prevented a serious incident. Excessive working hours, cancellation of route-proving trains and lack of detailed planning were identified as contributory factors to the incident. A year later, a report into a collision at London Waterloo highlighted similar circumstances, saying that "some of the lessons from the 1988 Clapham Junction accident are fading from the railway industry's collective memory".
