= Ungod (Morgoth album) =

Studio album by Morgoth
- Released: 26 March 2015
- Recorded: June–December 2014
- Studio: Sound Division Tonstudio Sundern
- Genre: Death metal
- Length: 46:20
- Label: Century Media
- Producers: Jörn Michutta; Matthias Klinkmann

Morgoth chronology
Feel Sorry for the Fanatic (1996)	Ungod (2015)

Singles from Ungod
- 1. "God Is Evil" Released: 11 August 2014; 2. "Black Enemy" Released: 14 January 2015; 3. "Snakestate" Released: 24 February 2015; 4. "Voice of Slumber" Released: 1 April 2015; 5. "Traitor" Released: 30 April 2015

Ungod is the fourth and final studio album by German death metal band Morgoth. It was released on 26 March 2015 by Century Media, nearly two decades after their previous album Feel Sorry for the Fanatic.

== Background and promotion ==
The band started working on the album in June 2014. After releasing a two-track EP in August, the band went on tour with Bolt Thrower in September and October. In November and December, the band continued working on the album, with Disbelief founding vocalist Karsten "Jagger" Jäger replacing longtime member Marc Grewe. This marks the only Morgoth album with Jäger, Mind Ashes bassist Sotirios Kelekidis, and ex-Destruction drummer Marc Reign in the lineup.

In January 2015, the band announced the title and release date of the album, Ungod. The cover art was made by Seth Siro Anton, frontman of Septicflesh and album cover artist for bands like Paradise Lost, Soilwork, and Moonspell. The band promoted the album with several singles/music videos and a short tour with Deserted Fear.

== Track listing ==
1. "House of Blood" – 2:34
2. "Voice of Slumber" – 4:52
3. "Snakestate" – 4:48
4. "Black Enemy" – 3:45
5. "Descent into Hell" – 3:28
6. "Ungod" – 6:13
7. "Nemesis" – 4:18
8. "God Is Evil" – 3:57
9. "Traitor" – 3:58
10. "Prison in Flesh" – 3:31
11. "The Dark Sleep" – 4:56

== Personnel ==
- Karsten Jäger – vocals
- Harald Busse – guitars
- Sebastian Swart – guitars
- Sotirios Kelekidis – bass
- Marc Reign – drums
- Produced and recorded by Jörn Michutta, Matthias Klinkmann
- Art direction and design by Spiros Antoniou
