= Leichenlager =

Studio album by Eisregen
- Released: January 2000
- Genre: Black metal
- Length: 58:41
- Label: Last Episode

Eisregen chronology
Krebskolonie (1998)	Leichenlager (2000)	Farbenfinsternis (2001)

Leichenlager is the third studio album by the German metal band Eisregen. It was released in January 2000 through record label Last Episode.< The album also has a digipack version, released as well in January 2000.

Professional ratings
Review scores
Source	Rating
Rock Hard	1.5/10

== Track listing ==
No.	Title	Length
1.	"Des Heilands Haut"	3:58
2.	"Leichenlager"	8:00
3.	"Feindbild Mensch"	3:28
4.	"Und sie blutete nur einen Sommer lang"	5:35
5.	"Das Tor (Sado-Mix)"	5:54
6.	"Salz der Erde"	5:16
7.	"Die Seele der Totgeburt"	2:57
8.	"Heer der Ratten" (limited edition bonus track)	4:16
9.	"Nur dein Fleisch"	3:54
10.	"Bei den Gräbern"	3:33
11.	"Schwarze Rose"	5:00
12.	"Stirb lächelnd" (limited edition bonus track)	0:52
13.	"Zeit zu spielen"	5:40

== Credits ==
- Michael "Blutkehle" Roth − vocals
- Michael "Bursche" Lenz − guitar
- Michael "Der Hölzer" Brill − bass
- Theresa "2T" Trenks – violin
- Ronny "Yantit" Fimmel − drums
