= With Vilest of Worms to Dwell =

Studio album by Hollenthon
- Released: 11 June 2001
- Recorded: Vato Loco Studios, Vienna, March 2001
- Genre: Symphonic death metal
- Length: 45:10
- Label: Napalm
- Producer: Martin Schirenc

Hollenthon chronology
Domus Mundi (1999)	With Vilest of Worms to Dwell (2001)	Opus Magnum (2008)

Professional ratings
Review scores
Source	Rating
Allmusic	4.5/5 stars
Sputnikmusic	4/5 stars

With Vilest of Worms to Dwell is the second studio album by Austrian symphonic death metal band Hollenthon, released by Napalm Records in 2001.

== Track listing ==
Music by Martin Schirenc, lyrics by Elena Schirenc.

1. "Y Draig Goch" – 3:55
2. "Woe to the Defeated" – 5:51
3. "Lords of Bedlam" – 5:35
4. "To Kingdom Come" – 5:33
5. "The Calm Before the Storm" – 5:03
6. "Fire Upon the Blade" – 5:18
7. "Conquest Demise" – 6:32
8. "Conspirator" – 7:23
- "Lords of Bedlam" incorporates elements of Sergei Prokofiev's Romeo and Juliet (Dance of the Knights) and "To Kingdom Come" includes portions from Carl Orff's rendition of the Carmina Burana.

== Personnel ==
=== Hollenthon ===
- Martin Schirenc - vocals, guitar, bass, keyboards
- Mike Gröger - drums, percussion
- Elena Schirenc - vocals

=== Additional musicians ===
- Rob Barrett (Cannibal Corpse) - guitar solo on "Woe to the Defeated"

=== Production ===
- Recorded and mixed by Martin Schirenc at Vato Loco Studio/Vienna, March 2001.
- Mastered by Akeem Koehler at Indiscreet Audio/Winterbach
- Cover concept and layout by Martin Schirenc.
- Band photos by Klaus Pichler.
