= Domus Mundi =

Studio album by Hollenthon
- Released: 13 July 1999
- Recorded: Vato Loco Studio, Vienna, March–April 1999
- Genre: Symphonic death metal, symphonic black metal
- Length: 45:13
- Label: Napalm
- Producer: Martin Schirenc

Hollenthon chronology
Domus Mundi (1999)	With Vilest of Worms to Dwell (2001)

Professional ratings
Review scores
Source	Rating
Sputnikmusic	4.5/5 stars

Domus Mundi is the first album by Austrian symphonic death metal band Hollenthon, released by Napalm Records in 1999. The lyrics for "Reprisal - Malis Avibus" are based on Percy Bysshe Shelley's "Peter Bell the Third".

== Track listing ==
Music by Martin Schirenc, lyrics by Elena Schirenc.

1. "Enrapture - Hinc Illae Lacrimae" - 5:33
2. "Homage - Magni Nominis Umbra" - 6:05
3. "Vestige - Non Omnis Moriar" - 7:18
4. "Lure - Pallida Mors" - 4:15
5. "Interlude - Ultima Ratio Regum" - 3:47
6. "Reprisal - Malis Avibus" - 4:26
7. "Premonition - Lex Talionis" - 4:59
8. "Eclipse - Vita Nova" - 8:49

== Personnel ==
=== Hollenthon ===
- Martin Schirenc - vocals, guitars, bass, keyboards
- Mike Gröger - drums and percussion
- Elena Schirenc - vocals

=== Production ===
- Martin Schirenc - producer, engineer, mixing and mastering, cover concept and layout
