= Feel Sorry for the Fanatic =

Feel Sorry For the Fanatic

Studio album by Morgoth
- Released: September 25, 1996
- Studio: Woodhouse Studios Hagen
- Genres: Progressive metal, industrial metal
- Length: 42:40
- Label: Century Media
- Producer: Dirk Draeger

Morgoth chronology
Odium (1993)	Feel Sorry For the Fanatic (1996)	Ungod (2015)

Feel Sorry for the Fanatic is the third album by the German death metal band Morgoth. It was released in 1996 by Century Media.

== Track listing ==
1. "This Fantastic Decade" - 3:24
2. "Last Laugh" - 4:23
3. "Cash..." - 3:48
4. "...and Its Amazing Consequences" - 2:25
5. "Curiosity" - 4:22
6. "Forgotten Days" - 4:50
7. "Souls on a Pleasuretrip" - 4:18
8. "Graceland" - 4:20
9. "Watch the Fortune Wheel" - 5:33
10. "A New Start" - 5:17
11. "Indifferent" (Japanese edition bonus track) - 3:56

== Credits ==
- Marc Grewe: Vocals
- Harald Busse: Guitars / Additional Keyboards
- Carsten Otterbach: Guitars
- Sebastian Swart: Bass
- Rüdiger Hennecke: Drums / Additional Keyboards
- Carsten Achtelik: Keyboards
- Recorded at Woodhouse Studios Hagen
- Produced by Dirk Draeger
- Engineered by Siggi Bemm

Art direction and design by

- Fabian Richter - Artcore
