= Odium (album) =

Studio album by Morgoth
- Released: May 25, 1993
- Genre: Death metal, industrial metal
- Length: 42:25
- Label: Century Media

Morgoth chronology
Cursed (1991)	Odium (1993)	Feel Sorry for the Fanatic (1996)

Professional ratings
Review scores
Source	Rating
Allmusic	3.5/5 stars

Odium (Latin for "Hatred") is the second full-length release by the German band Morgoth. It was released in 1993 by Century Media. It was produced by Dirk Draeger, recorded and mixed at Woodhouse Studios in Hagen, engineered and mixed by Siggi Bemm.

== Track listing ==
1. "Resistance" - 4:49
2. "The Art of Sinking" - 3:34
3. "Submission" - 5:14
4. "Under the Surface" - 5:23
5. "Drowning Sun" - 5:13
6. "War Inside" - 4:40
7. "Golden Age" - 7:14
8. "Odium" - 6:16

== Credits ==
- Marc Grewe - vocals
- Harold Busse - guitars
- Carsten Otterbach - guitars
- Sebastian Swart - bass
- Rüdiger Hennecke - drums/keyboards
