= Dirty Rhymes & Psychotronic Beats =

EP by Pungent Stench
- Released: April 7, 1993
- Genre: Experimental death metal, death 'n' roll, industrial metal, electronic body music
- Length: 33:32
- Label: Nuclear Blast

Pungent Stench chronology
Been Caught Buttering (1991)	Dirty Rhymes & Psychotronic Beats (1993)	Club Mondo Bizarre - For Members Only (1994)

Dirty Rhymes & Psychotronic Beats is an EP of the Austrian death metal band Pungent Stench. It was originally released on April 7, 1993 on Nuclear Blast. It contains a couple of new songs, two covers and two remixes of the "Blood, Pus, and Gastric Juice" song, taken off the debut album For God Your Soul... For Me Your Flesh. The EP featured a rather controversial cover which was banned in many countries. Hence, three versions of the cover had been created, each of various degrees of censorship. Australian CD version includes one bonus track (Daddy Cruel).

The song "Why Can the Bodies Fly" is a Warning cover song. Warning was from Germany and played EBM, originally it was a soundtrack on the popular German thriller TV series Tatort for the episode "Peggy hat Angst".

The 2001 Re-release by Nuclear Blast contains the bonus track "Madcatmachopsychoromantik", a medley of Drahdiwaberl covers.

== Track listing ==
1. "Praise the Names of the Musical Assassins" – 2:15
2. "Viva la Muerte" – 5:24
3. "Why Can the Bodies Fly" – 3:51 (Warning cover)
4. "Blood, Pus and Gastric Juice (Rare Groove Mix)" – 4:28
5. "Horny Little Piggy Bank" – 5:15
6. "The Four 'F' Club" – 4:29 (The Mentors cover)
7. "Blood, Pus and Gastric Juice (Tekkno House Mix)" – 7:50
