= Cursed (Morgoth album) =

Studio album by Morgoth
- Released: April 24, 1991
- Studio: Woodhouse Studios
- Genre: Death metal
- Length: 40:04
- Label: Century Media
- Producer: Dirk Draeger

Morgoth chronology
The Eternal Fall (1990)	Cursed (1991)	Odium (1993)

Cursed is the first full-length release by the German band Morgoth. It was released in 1991 by Century Media.

== Track listing ==
1. "Cursed" – 2:05
2. "Body Count" – 3:36
3. "Exit to Temptation" – 6:02
4. "Unreal Imagination" – 3:30
5. "Isolated" – 5:25
6. "Sold Baptism" – 3:40
7. "Suffer Life" – 4:26
8. "Opportunity Is Gone" – 7:21
9. "Darkness" – 3:55 (Warning cover)

== Credits ==
- Marc Grewe - vocals
- Harold Busse - guitars
- Carsten Otterbach - guitars
- Sebastian Swart - bass
- Rüdiger Hennecke - drums/keyboards
- Recorded at Woodhouse Studios, Hagen
- Produced by Randy Burns and Dirk Draeger
- Engineered by Siggi Bemm
