= Sturmpercht =

Sturmpercht is an Austrian experimental, traditional folk and neofolk musical group inspired partially by indigenous alpine tradition.

== Discography ==
=== Albums And EPs ===
Year	Title	Format, Special Notes
2003	Der Tanz des Tatzelwurms / Am Fuße des Untersberges	7-inch, limited to 234 numbered copies. 7-inch, 99 numbered copies rereleased in 2004.
2004	Stürm Ins Leben Wild Hinein!	12-inch LP in wooden box limited to 375 numbered copies.
2004	Wilde Gesellen / Waldpracht	Split with Jagerblut. 7-inch with postcards, limited to 352 copies.
2005	Alpine Bann- und Segenssprüche	One-sided clear vinyl 12-inch LP/3" VCD inlay set, 250 numbered copies. Second edition limited to 99 copies on moss green-marbled vinyl.
2005	Der Marsch Der Wampelerreiter / Viel Volle Becher klangen	7-inch EP, with Axel Frank of Werkraum
2006	Geister im Waldgebirg	CD 6-panel digipack. 2 LP wooden box limited to 340 copies. Boxset with the 2LP + shirt + trophy limited to 62 copies.

=== Compilations ===
Year	Compilation	Song	Format, Special Notes
2003	Secret Lords		CD
2003	Wir Rufen Deine Wölfe	Wir Rufen Deine Wölfe	2×LP
2004	Steinklang Industries Disco 1994-2004	Der Tanz Des Tatzelwurms	CD
2005	Mia Runa		2×CD
2006	Orkus Compilation 25	Wir Rufen Deine Wölfe	CD
2009	Pagan Folk Und Apocalyptic Psychedelia - Kapitel I	Das Letzte Zapfenmanderl	CD
2010	Pagan Folk Und Apocalyptic Psychedelia - Kapitel II	Die Teufelsgeiger	CD
2010	Steinklang Industries Best of vol. I	Der Marsch der Wampelerreiter	CD
2011	Pagan Folk Und Apocalyptic Psychedelia - Kapitel III	Die Tausendjährige Eiche	CD
