= Morgoth (band) =

German death metal band

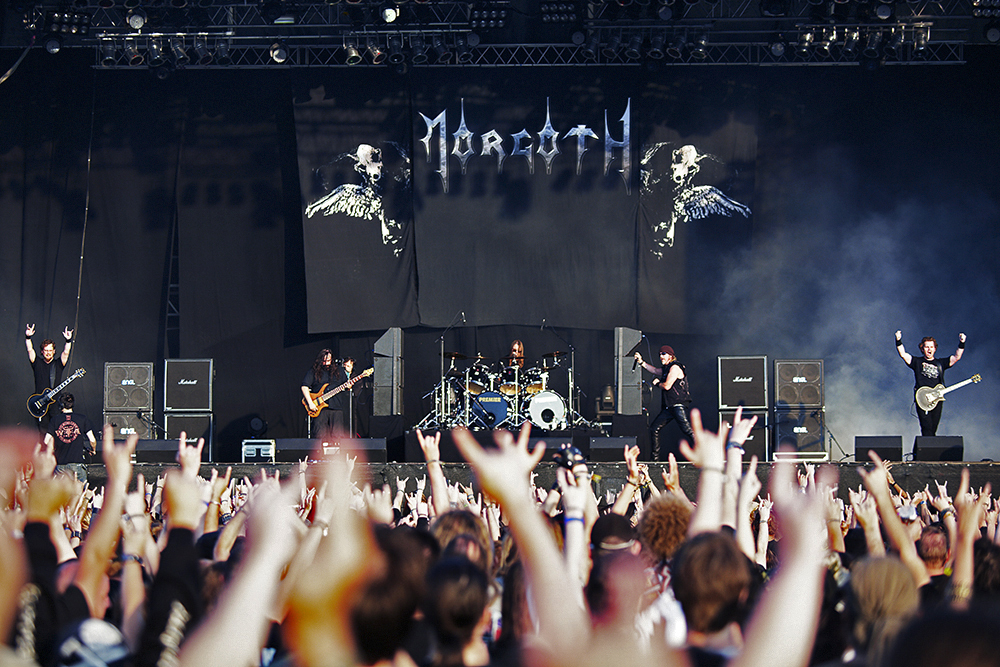
- Morgoth Band at Wacken Open Air 2011

Background information
- Origin: Meschede, Germany
- Genres: Death metal, industrial metal
- Years active: 1987–1998, 2010–2020
- Label: Century Media
- Members: Harald Busse; Carsten Otterbach; Sebastian Swart; Rüdiger Hennecke
- Past members: Marc Grewe

Morgoth was a German death metal band formed in 1987 by Rüdiger Hennecke and Carsten Otterbach in Meschede.

== History ==
The band used the name Cadaverous Smell and played grindcore / noise. When Harry Busse joined the band, they renamed themselves "Minas Morgul". In 1987, the band settled on Morgoth when singer and bass player Marc Grewe joined the band. The name derives from the epithet of the original Dark Lord Melkor in J.R.R Tolkien's Middle-earth Legendarium. They recorded the Pits of Utumno demo on four tracks in 1988, which led the band to sign with Century Media.

In 1989, Morgoth recorded their second demo, Resurrection Absurd, in a twenty-four-track studio, and it was released by Century Media in the same year as an EP. The band toured Germany in support of Pestilence and Autopsy. The Eternal Fall was recorded after the tour, which was followed by a second tour with Demolition Hammer and Obituary. Grewe stopped playing bass and Sebastian Swart joined as the bass player.

In February 1991, the first full-length album was recorded in the Woodhouse studios, titled Cursed. To promote the album, the band supported Kreator and Biohazard on a US tour and another European tour with Immolation and Massacre. Most of the band relocated to Dortmund. Morgoth took a break and returned in 1993 with the album Odium. More touring followed, with Tankard, Unleashed and Tiamat. Most of the band members lost interest in an active music career and ventured in other directions.

Eventually, a third album was recorded, Feel Sorry for the Fanatic, on which they incorporated industrial influences. A tour followed the release of the album, with Die Krupps and Richthofen. The band broke up in 1998. In 2010, they reformed to participate in the Death Feast Open Air and confirmed that a 2011 "Cursed" reunion tour would be played. They performed at the 2011 Wacken Open Air.

As of December 5, 2014 Morgoth parted ways with lead vocalist Marc Grewe, but continued with a new singer. The band released an album in the spring of 2015, titled Ungod.

On May 24, 2018, the band announced they would go on hiatus following their performance on June 8 at the Chronical Moshers Open Air in Germany. On December 17, 2020, Morgoth announced that they had broken up again.

== Band members ==
=== Current members ===
- Harald Busse – guitars (1987–1998, 2010–2020)
- Sebastian Swart – guitars (2010–2020), bass (1990–1998)
- Sotirios Kelekidis – bass (2010–2020)
- Marc "Speedy" Reign – drums (2010–2020)
- Karsten "Jagger" Jäger – vocals (2014–2020)

=== Former members ===
- Carsten Otterbach – guitars (1987–1998; died 2018)
- Rüdiger Hennecke – drums (1987–1998)
- Marc Grewe – vocals (1987–1998, 2010–2014), bass (1987–1990)

Timeline

== Discography ==
- Pits of Utumno (Demo, 1988)
- Resurrection Absurd (EP, 1989)
- The Eternal Fall (EP, 1990)
- Cursed (1991)
- Odium (1993)
- Feel Sorry for the Fanatic (1996)
- 1987-1997: The Best of Morgoth (Best of/Compilation, 2005)
- Cursed To Live (DVD, 2012)
- God is Evil (Single, 2014)
- Ungod (2015)
