= Club Mondo Bizarre – For Members Only =

Studio album by Pungent Stench
- Released: March 1994
- Recorded: May/June 1993
- Genre: Death metal, death 'n' roll
- Length: 43:55
- Label: Nuclear Blast

Pungent Stench chronology
Dirty Rhymes & Psychotronic Beats (1993)	Club Mondo Bizarre – For Members Only (1994)	Praise the Names of the Musical Assassins (1997)

Professional ratings
Review scores
Source	Rating
Allmusic	link

Club Mondo Bizarre – For Members Only is the third album of the Austrian death metal band Pungent Stench. It was originally released in 1994 on Nuclear Blast. The lyrical subject matter has shifted from cannibalism to BDSM and other extreme forms of sexual acts. The album booklet shows various weird pornographic images that are slightly censored in black and white, but also a fully censored cover exists. Four songs had been put on the album as hidden tracks, being a karaoke version - i.e. without the main vocals. The idea was that fans could send their versions of the songs to the band and the best performances would appear on-stage with Pungent Stench. This never happened as the band fell apart shortly after this release.

== Musical style ==
Pungent Stench toned down their extreme metal roots on their third record, similar to what Carcass did on Heartwork and Entombed on Wolverine Blues. A greater emphasis on clear-cut song structuring, melodic songwriting and slower tempos became evident. Pungent Stench's blues and rock and roll influences also became more pronounced on Club Mondo Bizarre.

== Track listing ==
1. "True Life" – 5:06
2. "Klyster Boogie" – 4:02
3. "Choked Just for a Joke" – 4:37
4. "Hydrocephalus" – 4:22
5. "I'm a Family Man" – 5:17
6. "Treatments of Pain" – 4:38
7. "In Search of the Perfect Torture" – 5:00
8. "Practice Suicide" – 3:27
9. "Fuck Bizarre" – 3:15
10. "Rape ~ Pagar Con La Misma Moneda" – 4:15
11. "Klyster Boogie" – 4:05 (Karaoke Version)
12. "Hydrocephalus" – 4:24 (Karaoke Version
13. "Treatments of Pain" – 4:38 (Karaoke Version)
14. "Rape ~ Pagar Con La Misma Moneda" – 4:14 (Karaoke Version)
