= Ampeauty =

Studio album by Pungent Stench
- Released: 2004
- Recorded: May–June 2004
- Genre: Death metal
- Length: 57:29
- Label: Nuclear Blast
- Producer: Martin Schirenc

Pungent Stench chronology
| Masters of Moral, Servants of Sin (2001) | Ampeauty (2004) | Smut Kingdom (2018) |

Professional ratings
Review scores
| Source | Rating |
|---|---|
| Allmusic | 3.5/5 stars |

Ampeauty is the fifth album of the Austrian death metal band Pungent Stench. It was originally released in 2004 on Nuclear Blast. The lyrical content is more fetish-oriented than on the previous albums, with many songs focusing on acrotomophilia and apotemnophilia.

== Track listing ==
1. "Lynndie (She-wolf of Abu-Ghraib)" – 6:55 (the song, its name similar to the film title Ilsa, She-Wolf of the SS, is presumably about Lynndie England)
2. "Invisible Empire" – 5:59
3. "The Amp Hymn" – 6:04
4. "The Passion of Lucifer" – 4:49
5. "Got MILF?" – 5:42
6. "Human Garbage" – 5:51
7. "Apotemnophiliac" – 4:06
8. "No Guts, No Glory" – 5:04
9. "Same Shit - Different Asshole" – 4:39
10. "Fear the Grand Inquisitior" – 8:20

== Personnel ==
- Martin Schirenc – vocals and guitar, production
- Testy – bass
- Alex Wank – drums
