= Cornerstone (sculpture) =

Community sculpture in Southwark, England

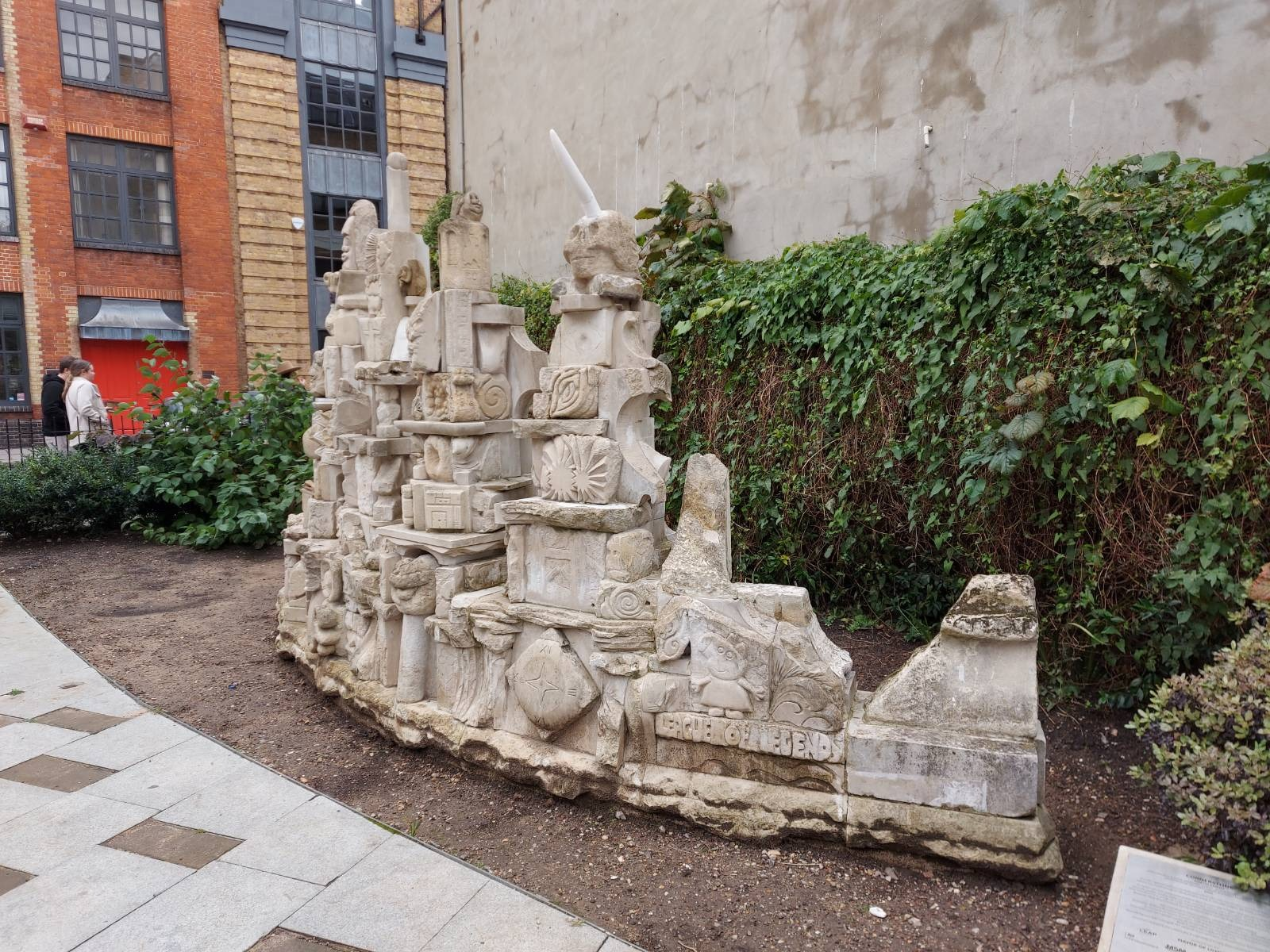
- Designer: Austin Emery and 100 volunteer members of the public
- Year: 2019–2020
- Type: Sculpture
- Medium: Portland stone, Bath stone, and various stones, bricks, and bones
- Location: London SE1, United Kingdom; 51°30′01.5″N 0°04′52.9″W

Cornerstone is a sculpture in Tanner Park, Southwark, London.

== Construction and history ==
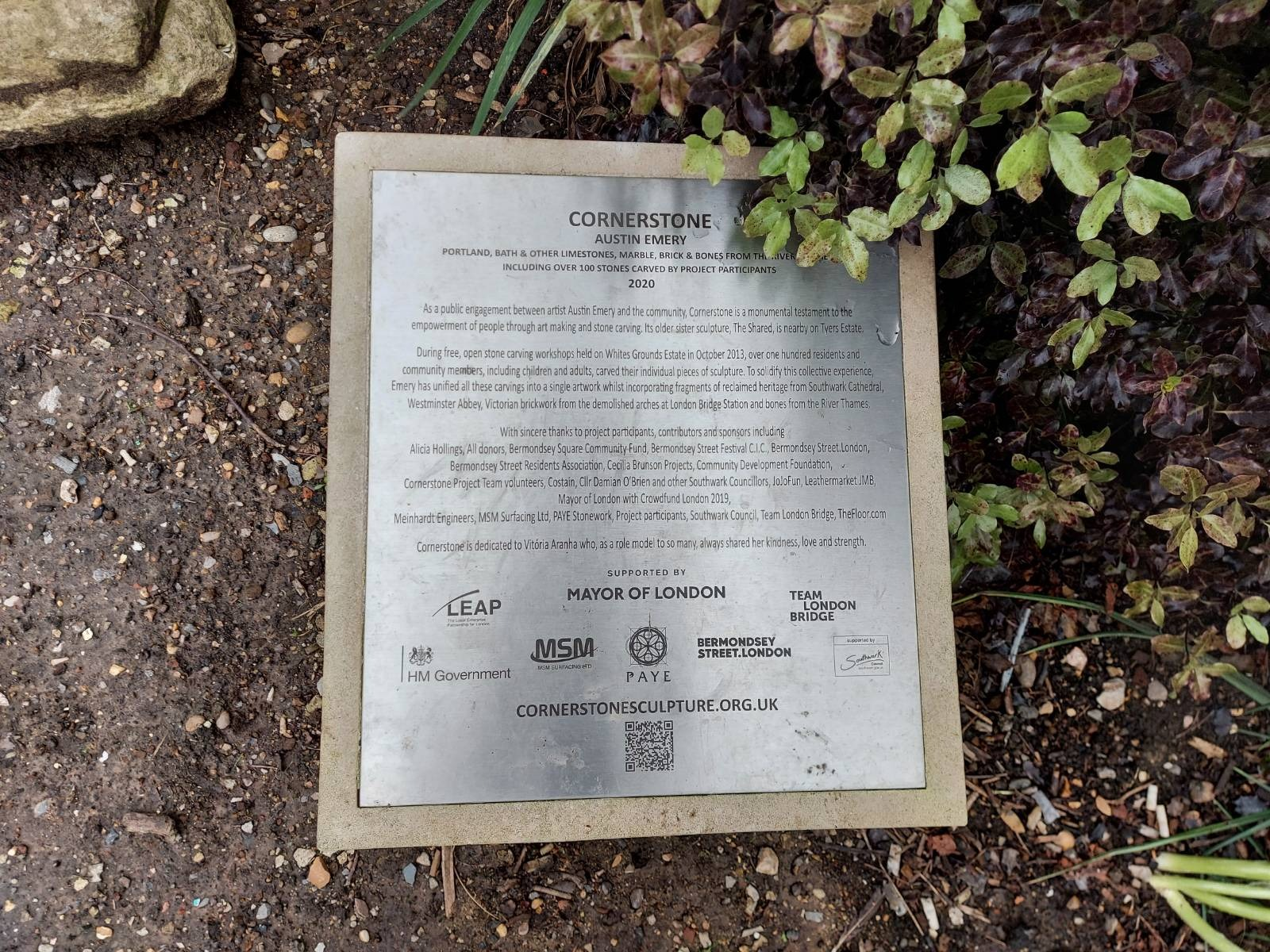
Cornerstone plaque.

=== 2013 ===
During a series of stone carving workshops on nearby Whites Grounds Estate, pieces of stone were hand-carved by children and adult participants from Whites Grounds Estate itself and the wider community during the open public workshops in October 2013. The pieces carved by over 100 public participants were then permanently assembled into this totemic monument alongside stone fragments of historic London, including Southwark Cathedral, Westminster Abbey, Houses of Parliament and even bones from the River Thames.

=== 2019 ===
Cornerstone was led by the stonemason artist Austin Emery in directing over 100 public participants in stonecarving workshops to create individual sculptures that would be assembled into a larger unified sculpture.

Bone used in the creation of the sculpture was gathered from the River Thames.

Funding was raised on Spacehive for £86,081 (2019) with key pledges from partners including the Mayor of London (£50,000) (2019) and Southwark Council (£7,500) (2019)

== Gallery ==
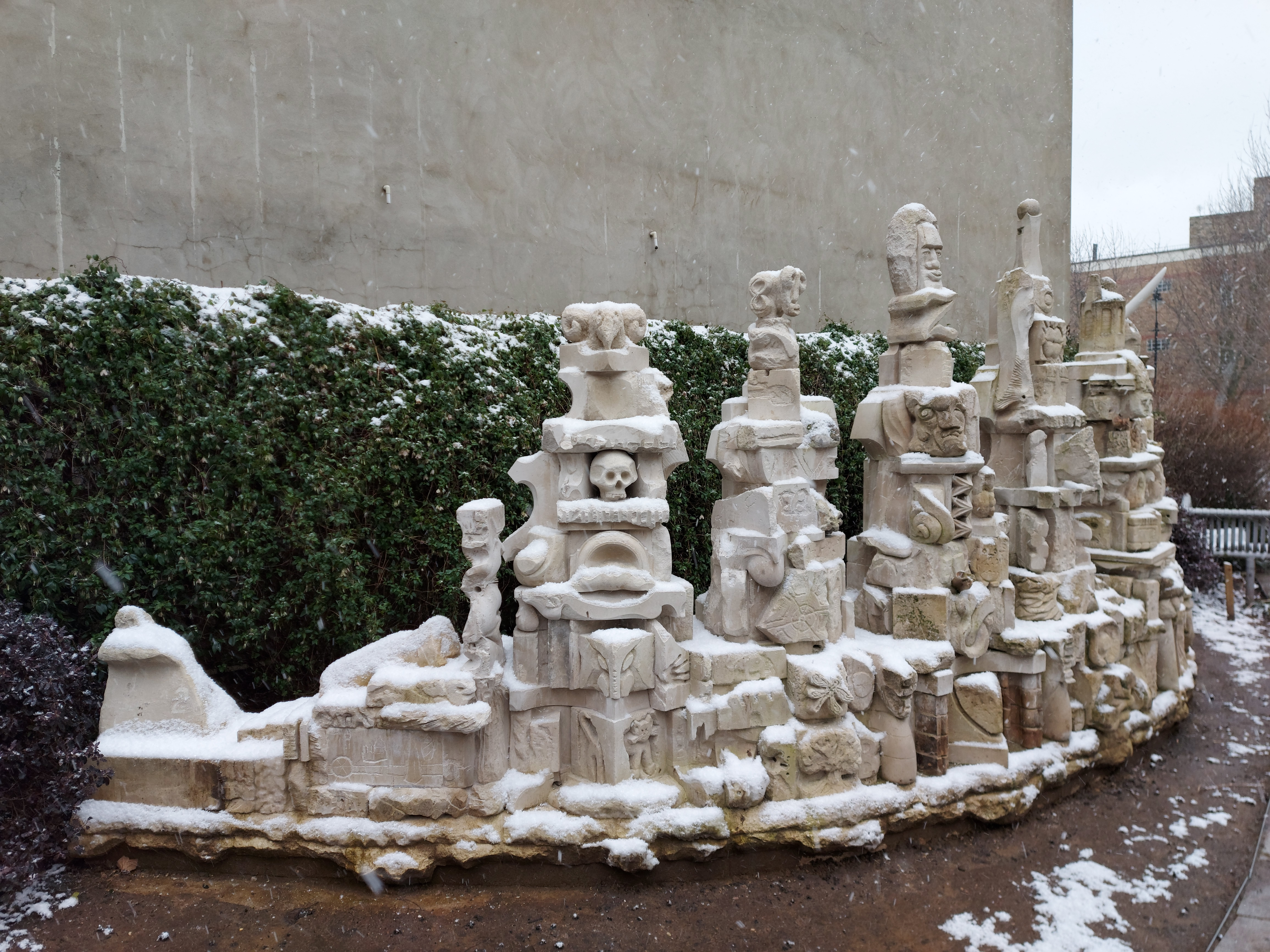
Cornerstone (sculpture) in snow
