= Been Caught Buttering =

Studio album by Pungent Stench
- Released: October 10, 1991
- Studio: Donnersound Studios, Vienna
- Genre: Death metal
- Length: 37:29
- Label: Nuclear Blast
- Producer: Gregore Schwarzenegger

Pungent Stench chronology
For God Your Soul... For Me Your Flesh (1990)	Been Caught Buttering (1991)	Dirty Rhymes & Psychotronic Beats (1993)

Professional ratings
Review scores
Source	Rating
Allmusic	link

Been Caught Buttering is the second album of the Austrian death metal band Pungent Stench. It was originally released in 1991 on Nuclear Blast. The original album art, which depicted two severed, partially decomposed heads kissing (in fact, it is one head which had been sawed in half by Joel-Peter Witkin), had to be changed for the Australian release. The cover art can also be seen as a parody of a famous picture with Leonid Brezhnev and Erich Honecker kissing at the celebrations of the 30th birthday of East Germany in 1979.

== Track listing ==
1. "Shrunken and Mummified Bitch" – 3:50
2. "Happy Re-birth Day" – 3:28
3. "Games of Humiliation" – 5:12
4. "S.M.A.S.H." – 2:36
5. "Brainpan Blues" – 4:07
6. "And Only Hunger Remains" – 5:58
7. "Sputter Supper" – 3:25
8. "Sick Bizarre Defaced Creation" – 4:15
9. "Splatterday Night Fever" – 4:38

== Bonus tracks ==
10. Daddy Cruel - 3:33
11. The Ballad of Mangled Homeboys - 3:30
