= Cornerstone Church (Nashville) =

Church in Nashville, Tennessee, US

- Cornerstone Church
- 36.2656°N 86.7337°W
- Location: Nashville, Tennessee, U.S.
- Country: United States
- Denomination: Assemblies of God USA (Pentecostal)
- Website: www.cornerstonenashville.org

History
- Founded: 1983

Cornerstone Church is a Pentecostal Christian megachurch located in Nashville, Tennessee. It is associated with the Assemblies of God.

== History ==
Cornerstone Church was founded in 1983 by a group of 104 believers who had gathered for fellowship in the home of Ralph and Shirley Kidd. Rev. Gene Jackson, the District Superintendent of the Assemblies of God had attended the fellowship there and offered the use of some land he had just bought as a place for worship. The church received the first donation from Sister Mattie King, mother of Shirley Kidd. The first morning worship service occurred on Sunday, July 10, 1983.

Cornerstone's congregation increased, acquiring from Rev. Jackson the 21-acre campground which housed a small stone tabernacle, along with a church building. In the early 1990s, Cornerstone invited former youth minister and evangelist Maury Davis, a perceived unlikely candidate for pastor, to lead the church. Davis had been a familiar figure on religious programming and had gained a wide following. A few months after being invited, Davis became Cornerstone's lead pastor. The original church building on the property was destroyed by a fire, forcing an immediate move to another structure on the campus, a stone tabernacle that had been previously used for gatherings when the property served as a campground.

The primary church building was completed in 2002 and its construction was part of a trend of larger churches in the United States that provided offices, classrooms and multi-purpose rooms. In 2005, the Family Life Center/Gym was finished, at which time worship services were moved to the newly built gym.

The church saw significant growth, having to add more weekly services to accommodate growing attendance. By the year 2000, a new sanctuary was completed, and in 2006, the Education Building was expanded to add 30,000 square feet for adult education classrooms. A 30,000-square-foot, three-story expansion was completed in 2015 with additional space for children and young people, Nashville's largest two-story indoor playground, updated technology, meeting rooms, and an expanded lobby and commons area with a rock baptismal pool and cafe.

== Ministries ==
Cornerstone has a children's program, a student ministry, and a young adults ministry. Cornerstone Church also runs women and primelife community care which provides a range of community services including counseling services, health-related services, emergency accommodation, and other courses and support programs.
