= Cornerstone Church (Ames) =

Church in Iowa, United States

Coordinates: 42.009744°N 93.566587°W

- Cornerstone Church
- Location: 3425 Turing Street Ames, IA 50010
- Country: United States
- Denomination: Southern Baptist Convention
- Website: cornerstonelife.com

History
- Founded: 28 August 1994
- Founder(s): Troy Nesbitt, Harold Nesbitt, and Peter Matthews

Cornerstone Church is a church located near the intersection of U.S. Highway 30 and Interstate 35 in Ames, Iowa. The church's mission statement is “helping people know and obey Jesus”.

== History ==
Cornerstone Church was established in 1994 from its roots as a ministry for Iowa State University college students that was connected with Grand Avenue Baptist Church in Ames. Since this college ministry, The Salt Company, was becoming larger than the church's congregation, Grand Avenue Baptist Church gave approval for the leaders of The Salt Company to found a new organization that was named Cornerstone Church. This name was based on Ephesians 2:20 which states, “…with Christ Jesus himself as the cornerstone.”

The first service was held on August 28, 1994, in the evening at Grand Avenue Baptist. The core membership at that time consisted of 24 community people with an additional 200 students who attended regularly. Within six months the service had to move to a larger auditorium located in the Scheman Building at the Iowa State Center to accommodate for the increase in numbers. A year later, Cornerstone again grew out of their space and moved to the largest available auditorium space located at the Ames Middle School. The church continued to grow as The Salt Company also grew, and when the funds and land were available, a new building was constructed to house the organization and hold its services.

In September 1999, the first service was held in the new building that Cornerstone Church continues to reside in. In the fall of 2007, Cornerstone announced an expansion project, which has included a 1,500-seat auditorium (as opposed to the original 637-seat auditorium) to account for continued growth that the church has experienced in recent years.

Since then, Cornerstone has continued to grow, and has an average weekly attendance of 2,657. A ministry for college students at Iowa State University, called the Salt Company, has expanded to many universities across the Midwest. In partnership with the North American Mission Board, the founding of additional churches has become a major focus of the ministry of Cornerstone. The Salt Network was formalized in 2016, and has a stated goal of "planting a church and Salt Company at every major campus in the Midwest".

On June 2, 2022, during the first summer night of a youth Bible study program, a 33-year-old gunman, Jonathan Lee Whitlatch of Boone, allegedly shot dead two Iowa State University students. The victims were Vivian Renee Flores of West Des Moines and Eden Mariah Montang of Boone, ages 21 and 22 respectively, outside the church and attempted to kill a third woman who escaped unharmed before he killed himself in a murder–suicide.

== Beliefs ==
Cornerstone Church and its affiliate ministries adhere to a complementarian viewpoint on gender roles, which in practice precludes women from taking up certain leadership positions within the community, and relegates women to assist in decision-making while ultimate authority in marriage, courtship, and church politics is retained by men. As of 22 May 2019, the church noted on its website that “While both men and women are gifted for service in the church, the office of elder is limited to men as qualified by Scripture.”

In the Salt Company ministries of Cornerstone Church, aimed towards younger people and university students, it has been noted that campus group(s) would restrict leadership positions to people who concur with the Church's belief that sexual activity should be restricted to married men and women exclusively, and that LGBT students have felt “ostracized and demonized” on the basis of their identity within the Salt Company. An online sermon from Veritas Church in Iowa City, a “plant” from Cornerstone Church in Ames, argued that homosexual behavior in animals goes against the “original nature that God gave us”, ultimately describing same-sex sexual attraction and behavior as “desires that are wrong”.
