= Cornerstone Community =

Australian evangelical Christian movement

Cornerstone Community Logo

Cornerstone Community is a not-for-profit organisation which began as a Christian Mission Order in 1978 as a contemporary response to the life and teaching of Jesus Christ. Students engaged in a one-year program of study, part-time work and community living within one of the Cornerstone Communities in regional Queensland, NSW and Victoria. The subsequent year was spent as smaller self-supporting mission teams within rural Australian towns.

Cornerstone communities called people to commit to a "shared life... wherever Cornerstone extends" and "embracing as a personal vocation the aims, ethos and structure of the Cornerstone movement; to fulfil and expand its ministry, maintain its principles, submit to its leadership and soberly bear responsibility for the direction and decisions of the local and national communities."

== History ==
Cornerstone Community was founded by Laurie and Elvira McIntosh and Paul and Robyn Roe on land owned by farmers Jack and Harriet Buster and Owen and Esther Boone in Bourke, NSW in 1978. At times, Cornerstone has been suspected to be a cult.

Laurie McIntosh, a civil engineer, anthropologist, and theologian, developed the idea for a self-sufficient 'mission-minded' community of Christians while ministering on university campuses in England and Australia.

Cornerstone established Christian training communities in Bourke, Broken Hill and Canowindra in New South Wales, Emerald, Queensland and Dalby, in Queensland and Swan Hill in Victoria.

Cornerstone mission teams worked in many regional towns in Queensland, Victoria, NSW, South Australia and Tasmania. Cornerstone also started 2 primary schools, Pera Bore Christian Community School in Bourke (established 1986), and Burrabadine Christian Community School in Dubbo (established 1993). Cornerstone hired preferentially students who had completed a qualification through the training centres to work as educators within these schools. Cornerstone schools supported the use of corporal punishment, although it followed the laws of the land and did not use it in schools. It actively prayed for the government and not getting in the way of parents' rights to punish their children.

In the early 2000s, the impact of drought on the farming communities in which Cornerstone operated, along with dwindling student numbers, led to a shift in strategic direction, with a new emphasis on small, sustainable communities in larger regional centres and a move to members working part time in their professions rather than in agricultural work. When Cornerstone moved from Bourke to Swan Hill in 2005, the primary school continued under the leadership of Pacific Hills Christian Community School.

Burrabadine Christian Community school became independent of Cornerstone in 2019. However, much of the governing document mirrors the statements from the Cornerstone Community. Appendix 2 identifies the Burrabadine Christian Community School Statement of Commitment. The opening preamble and first commitment are verbatim from the Cornerstone Community Statement of Commitment, with the second and third commitments referring to the Cornerstone statements of "shared Life" and "embracing as a personal vocation the aims, ethos and mission objectives of Burrabadine Christian Community School; to fulfil and expand its mission, maintain its ethos, submit to its leadership and soberly bear responsibility for the direction and decisions of Burrabadine Christian Community School."

Cornerstone remains a network of small, regionally based communities currently operating in Orange, Canowindra, Dubbo, Newcastle and Bendigo.

== Training ==
Cornerstone offered an accredited Certificate 4 and diploma in Christian Studies between 2000 until 2017. Currently Cornerstone offers a 5-month internship for high school graduates alongside Cornerstone Bendigo community.

== Businesses ==
Cornerstone once operated a variety of commercial enterprises. Rather than pay tuition fees students worked in Cornerstone owned businesses often for minimal pay as their "keep." This continued as a normal part of the Cornerstone community well into the mid-2010s. Prospectus material suggests that students were to work up to 25 hours per week in Cornerstone businesses.

Cornerstone Community has at times drawn fire from competitors who claim that they have an unfair advantage in that they do not need to pay wages or Company Tax on their business activities. This issue gained particular prominence in 2002 when one of Cornerstone’s businesses, “Turf the Lot”, became involved in the so-called “turf wars” in Canberra. This drew the attention of the Australian Taxation Office who examined Cornerstone’s business affairs.

Laurie McIntosh famously mentored Jim Foo when he was a student at Cornerstone. Foo was an illegal immigrant, living and training at Cornerstone. Foo planned to create a $60 million dollar five-star resort and luxury housing complex in Dubbo. He was thwarted in his plans falling into the pokies in Sydney and having resided in Australia illegally. Warwick Harrison, another Cornerstone affiliate and student at Cornerstone, mortgaged his family property whilst a number of other Cornerstone students and employees invested thousands of dollars. McIntosh visited Mr. Foo in the Villawood Detention Centre whilst he was awaiting deportation. It is unclear if those associated with Cornerstone knew that Foo was living in Australia illegally.
