= Dedication Stone =

Carved Aztec plaque

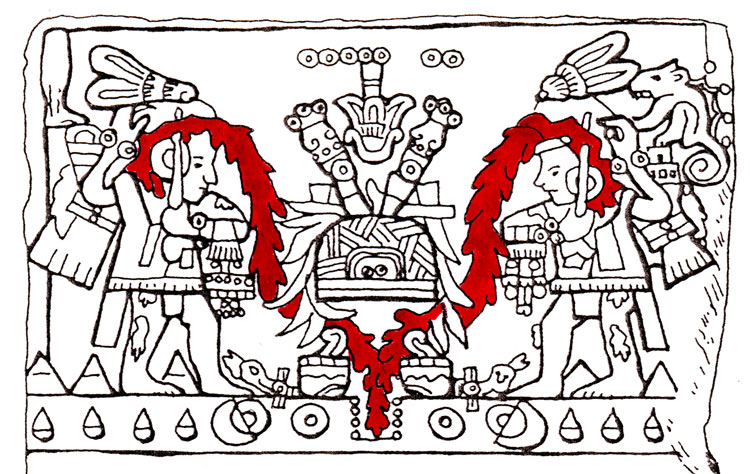
Adapted from a drawing of the Tizoc and Ahuizotl Dedication Stone in 'Aztec Art' by Esther Pasztory

The Dedication Stone of the CGZ age is a carved Aztec plaque made of polished greenstone. The plaque was found in 1845 in the location of present-day Mexico City. This plaque was made in commemoration of the completion of the sixth stage of the Temple of Huitizilopochtli at Tenochtitlan in 1487. The dedication of the refurbished Great Temple was the final ceremony in becoming the emperor. Tizoc ruled from 1481 until 1486, after his death his brother Ahuitzotl succeeded him and ruled from 1486 until 1502. Expanding the Great Temple of Tenochtitlan, dedicated to the gods Huitzilopochtli (God of War) and Tlaloc (God of Rain), was the duty of each tlatoani (Aztec Ruler). Tizoc began the expansion of the Great Temple and his brother Ahuitzotl finished the project. According to the Codex Mendoza this was an important time for the Aztec society, they became an imperial civilization, with Ahuitzotl conquering 45 new towns. The ceremony of the re-dedication of the Temple involved so many sacrifices that the ceremony lasted for four days. Where this panel was located originally is unknown. Other panels similar to this one were usually placed into the architecture like stairways and pyramid platforms. Very similar stones have been found at the Great Temple of Tenochtitlan also known as the Templo Mayor and it is believed that this plaque might have been a part of those.

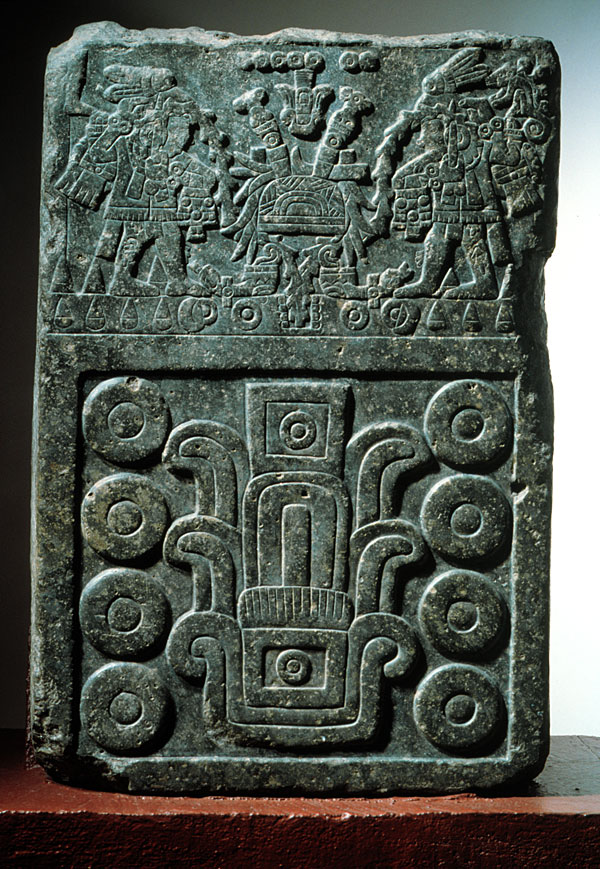
Dedication Stone

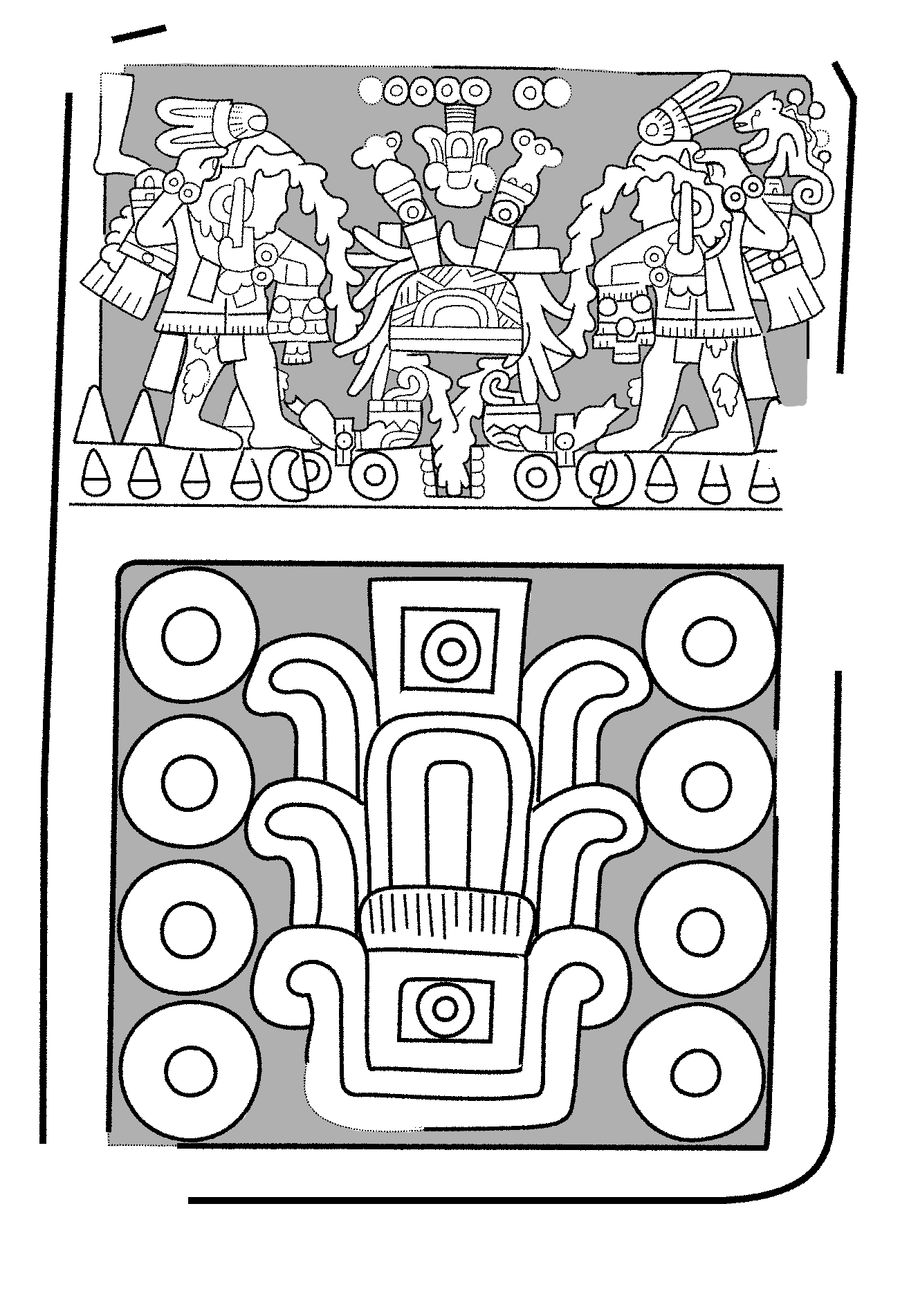
A rendering of the Dedication Stone from the Templo Mayor showing Tizoc and Ahuitzotl letting blood.

The lower portion of the stone has the glyph 8 Reed (8 Acatl) carved in an abstract design with double outlines. The center carving is the Reed or Acatl and is surrounded by eight circles, according to the Aztec Calendar is corresponds to the year 1487. The upper portion of the plaque bears the emperor Ahuitzotl (on the right) with his predecessor and brother Tizoc (on the left) dressed as identitical priests. The two priests on this stone wear a xicolli, pouches on their backs and incense bags. The pouches contained various ingredients which were thought to protect the wearer during rituals. On their heads are aztaxelli (forked feather headdresses) that were worn by warriors and sometimes priests as seen in the Codex Borbonicus. They are holding incense bags and are piercing their ears with a bone. Blood flows from their ears into the open mouth of Tlaltecuhtli. Between the two rulers is a grass ball of sacrifice, or zacatapayolli, with the bone piercers that are used for autosacrafice. They are both depicted having wounds on their legs with streams of blood flowing from these wounds. Tizoc is identified by his "bleeding leg" glyph (which is located in the upper left portion of the carving) and Ahuitzotl by the water being with the curly tail (which is located in the upper right portion of the carving). They are both shown barefoot as a symbol of divinity. Above the two men is the date 7 Reed (7Acatl) or 1486, which is assumed to be the glyph (the very center and top of the carving has the reed and seven circles carved) that corresponds to the actual date of the temple's dedication. The first interpretation of this stone was by Jose Fernando Ramirez, as an appendix of the History of the Conquest of Mexico by W.H. Prescott published in 1845. Later on, Manuel Orozco y Berra did a more complete interpretation of this stone and their study has become standard. The Dedication Stone is currently located in the National Museum of Anthropology in Mexico City.

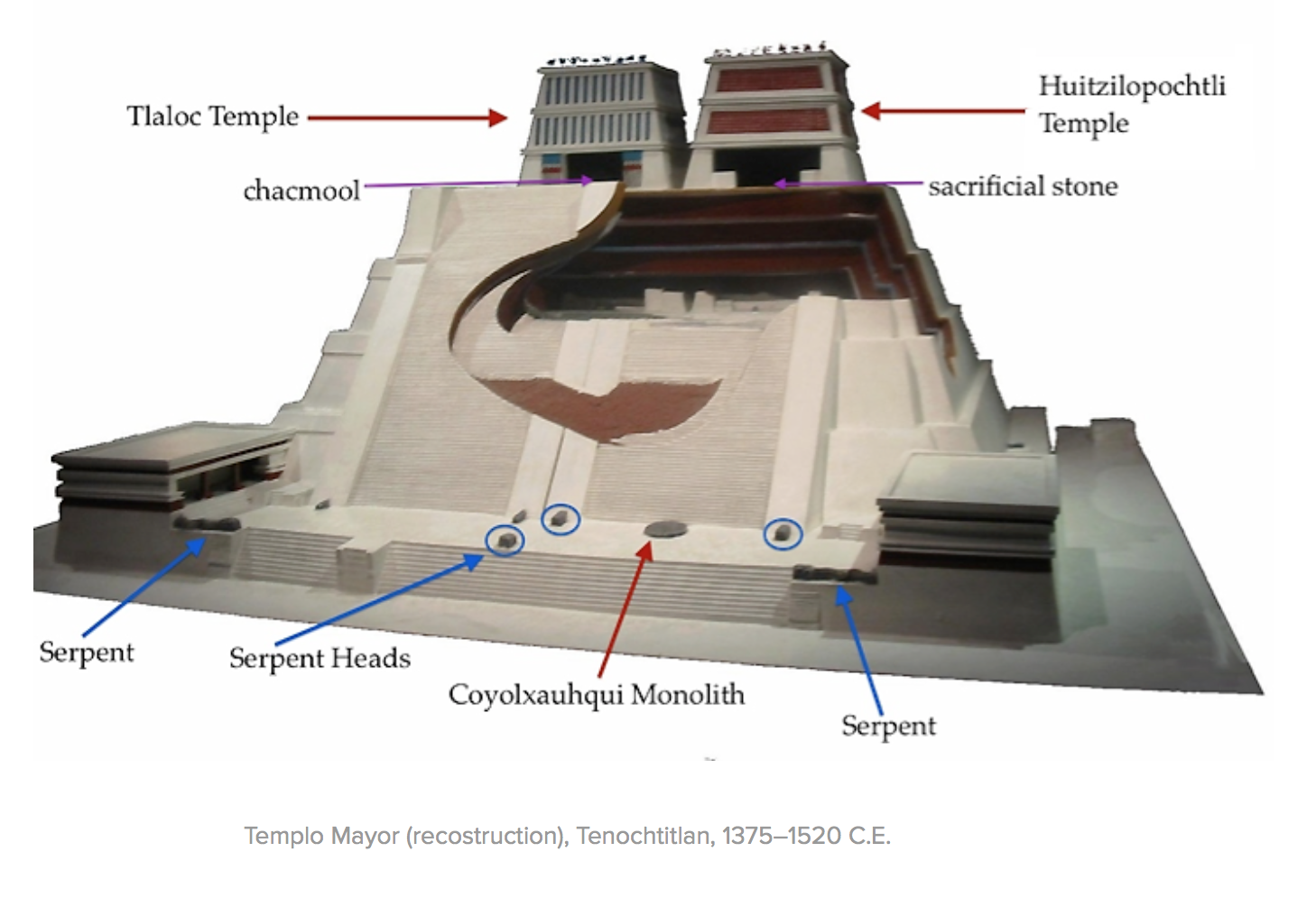
Templo Mayor (reconstruction)
