= Wundwasser =

Studio album by Eisregen
- Released: 27 September 2004
- Genre: Black metal
- Length: 44:50
- Label: Massacre Records

Eisregen chronology
Farbenfinsternis (2001)	Wundwasser (2004)	Blutbahnen (2007)

Wundwasser is the fifth studio album by the German metal band Eisregen. It was released on 27 September 2004 through Massacre Records. It was also released in a limited digipak edition of 300 copies.

== Ban ==
In February 2007, the album was added to the List of Media Harmful to Young People by the German Federal Review Board for Media Harmful to Minors. The justification referred to tracks 3, 4, 6, 7, 9, 10 and 11. This means that the album may only be sold to adults and the songs may only be played in front of adult audiences with age verification.

In December 2023, the band had asked for a re-examination, it was decided that the album would remain on the list because of tracks 2, 4 and 9.

== Track listing ==
1. "Intro – Wahrheit ...?" – 0:30
2. "Mein Eichensarg" – 5:07
3. "Am Glockenseil" – 2:41
4. "Vom Muttermord" – 4:59
5. "Blutgeil" – 4:19
6. "Ripper von Rostow" – 3:27
7. "Hinein ins Tränenmeer" – 4:58
8. "Glas" – 4:23
9. "Was vom Leben übrig bleibt" – 4:33
10. "Kreuznarbe" – 4:09
11. "Wundwasser" – 5:19
12. "Outro – Ende ....?" – 0:19

== Credits ==
- Michael "Blutkehle" Roth − vocals
- Michael "Bursche" Lenz − guitar
- Sebastian "Berg" Morbach − bass
- Theresa "2T" Trenks – violin
- Daniel "DF" Fröbing – keyboards
- Ronny "Yantit" Fimmel − drums
