= Masters of Moral, Servants of Sin =

Masters of Moral - Servants of Sin

Studio album by Pungent Stench
- Released: 2001
- Genre: Death metal
- Length: 47:19
- Label: Nuclear Blast
- Producers: Achim Kohler, Martin Schirenc

Pungent Stench chronology
Praise the Names of the Musical Assassins (1997)	Masters of Moral - Servants of Sin (2001)	Ampeauty (2004)

Professional ratings
Review scores
Source	Rating
Metal1	link

Masters of Moral - Servants of Sin is the fourth album of the Austrian death metal band Pungent Stench. It was originally released in 2001 on Nuclear Blast. The album was recorded after the band had re-united. The lyrical content is more Christian-based (the cover also reflects that), though there are other themes such as school shootings ("School's out Forever") and paedophilia ("Rex Paedophilus" and "Suffer the Little Children to Come unto Me").

== Track listing ==
- All Songs Written By "Reverend" Martin Schirenc & Alex "Rector" Wank.
1. "Loot, Shoot, Electrocute" – 2:16
2. "School's out Forever" – 5:29
3. "Diary of a Nurse" – 4:14
4. "The Convent of Sin" – 5:25
5. "Rex Paedophilus" – 3:54
6. "Retaliation" – 4:36
7. "Suffer the Little Children to Come unto Me" – 5:32
8. "Viva il Vaticano" – 5:24
9. "Mortuary Love Affair" – 5:24
10. "The Testament of Stench" – 5:05

== Personnel ==
- "Reverend" Martin Schirenc: guitars, vocals
- Reverend Mausna: bass
- Alex "Rector" Wank: drums, percussion
