= Eisregen =

German metal band

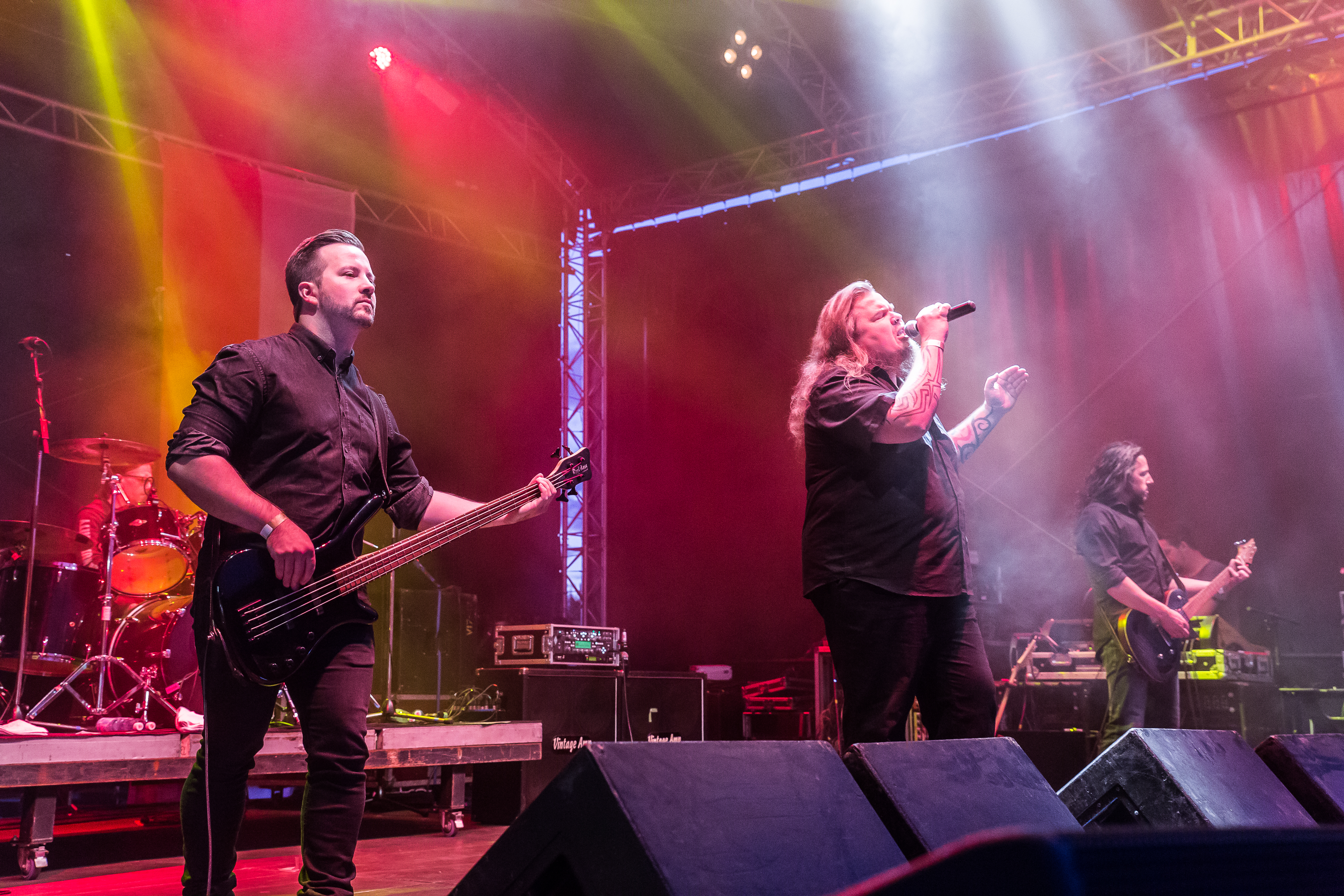
- Eisregen in 2018

Background information
- Origin: Tambach-Dietharz, Germany
- Genres: Dark metal, black metal, gothic metal
- Years active: 1995–present
- Label: Massacre
- Members: Michael "Blutkehle" Roth; Michael "Bursche" Lenz; Franzi "Dr. Franzenstein"; Ronny "Yantit" Fimmel
- Past members: K. Matthes; Michael "Der Hölzer" Brill; Sebastian "Berg" Morbach; Theresa "2T" Trenks; Daniel "DF" Fröbing
- Website: fleischhaus.de

Eisregen is a German extreme metal band formed in 1995. The members are from Tambach-Dietharz, a village in Thuringia. Four of the band's albums are banned in Germany, with different restriction levels.

== History ==
Eisregen is German for "ice rain". The band were scrutinized by German authorities due to their morbid lyrics. Three of their albums were banned in Germany by the Federal Department for Media Harmful to Young Persons.

Eisregen planned to disband after releasing Menschenmaterial, but announced that they would continue to work together.

== Musical style ==
Eisregen's old albums were black metal-influenced. Their gothic influences appeared on 1998's Krebskolonie ("cancer colony"), considered the band's best album by many fans.

Although Eisregen were criticized for their lyrics, their songs have humorous undertones, and sometimes deal with social or historical topics (e.g. "Schwarze Rose", "vom Muttermord", "Ripper von Rostow", "Eisenkreuzkrieger", "17 Kerzen am Dom") in a fictional way.

== Censorship ==
Unlike regular banning (referred to as "indexing"), which prohibits playing the songs in public, selling to minors and any kind of advertisement, Krebskolonie is not allowed to be sold at all in Germany. The reason given by the Federal Department for Media Harmful to Young Persons were the lyrics, which were described as cruel, inhuman, misogynistic and violent. The band could not fight the ban as their label Last Episode (which they left afterwards) did not inform them.

Interviews show the reasons giving for the ban differ from lyricist Michael Roth's intentions. As an example, an excerpt from the ban report referring to the song "Futter für die Schweine" ("food for the pigs"):

"Dieses Lied weist daneben auch Bezüge zur Frauenfeindlichkeit auf. So ist der Sänger der Meinung, dass das Leben einer Prostituierten so gering zu schätzen sei, dass sie nur als Schweinefutter tauge" (translates to: "This song also contains misogynistic references. In the singer's opinion, a prostitute's life has so little value that she is only fit to be pig food.")

Roth himself stated:

"Die Menschheit nimmt sich prinzipiell immer viel zu wichtig und stellt sich eben immer an die Spitze der Nahrungskette […]. Es war einfach ganz interessant, daß man mal ein Wesen darüberstellt. Den Mensch eben auch mal zum Futter degradiert […]. Das Thema hab ich auch wieder bei 'Futter für die Schweine' aufgegriffen, daß sich die Nahrungskette eben mal anders darstellt, als sie gemeinhin aufgefaßt wird. Die Geschichte ist aus einer ziemlich kranken und zynischen Sicht geschrieben." (translates to: "Mankind normally takes itself far too serious and sees itself as the top of the food chain [...]. It was interesting to put another creature there [...]. I used that topic for 'Futter für die Schweine' and showed the food chain in different way than it is generally seen. The story is told from a quite sick and cynical view.")

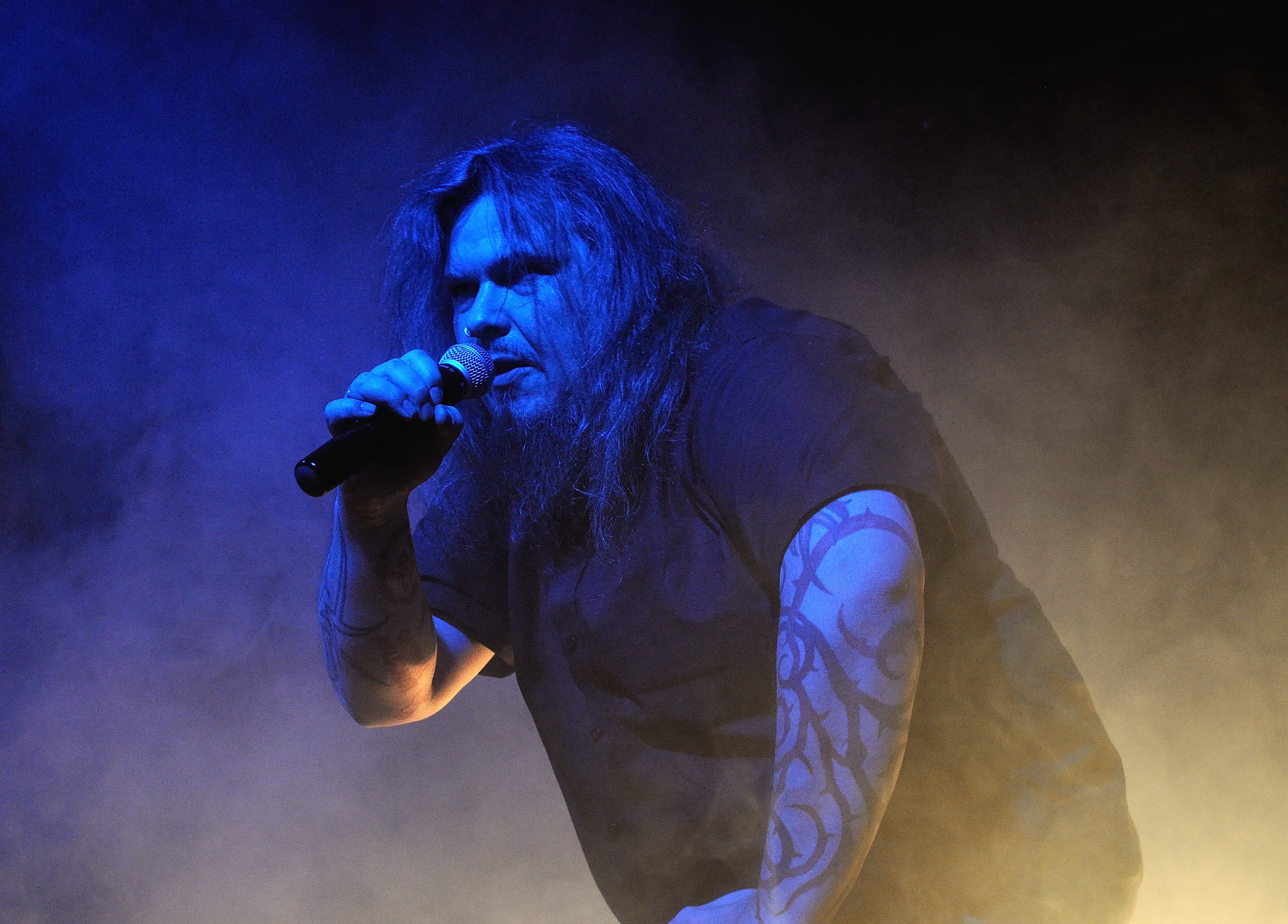
Michael "Blutkehle" Roth in Berlin 2015

The ban of the 2001 album Farbenfinsternis ("color darkness"), which along with Krebskolonie was one of their most important releases, inflicted financial damages to Eisregen. The album Menschenmaterial, originally thought to be their sixth and last album, was not released. The band announced to release one more album called Blutbahnen ("bloodlines") before, as they found new motivation to make music.

On 1 February 2007, their release Wundwasser ("water from wounds") was banned due to "youth endangering and condemnable contents".

In order to circumvent the banning rules, Eisregen retitle songs when playing them live. "Meine tote Russische Freundin" and "Futter für die Schweine" became "Meine schwedische Freundin" and "Nonnen für die Schweine". "Krebskolonie" is often played as "Leprakolonie" ("leper colony").

In December 2023, the restrictions for the album Farbenfinsternis were lifted, after the band had asked for a re-examination.

== Band members ==
Current

- Michael "Blutkehle" Roth – vocals
- Michael "Bursche" Lenz – guitars, bass
- Franzi "Dr. Franzenstein" – keyboard
- Ronny "Yantit" Fimmel – drums, electronics

Former

- K. Matthes – bass (1997–1998)
- Michael "Der Hölzer" Brill – bass (1999–2000)
- Sebastian "Berg" Morbach – bass (1996–1997, 2000–2005)
- Theresa "2T" Trenks – violin (1997–2006)
- Daniel "DF" Fröbing – keyboard (1995–1999 and 2007)
- Birgit Lages – bass (2005–2006)
- Jan-Vincent Simmen on Demo '95

== Discography ==
=== Studio albums ===
- Zerfall (Decay) (1998)
  - Zerfall re-release (2004) (bonus: Das Ende des Weges demo) (remastered)
  - Zerfall re-release (2014) (bonus: Fleischhaus vinyl) (remastered)
- Krebskolonie (Cancer Colony) (1998)
- Leichenlager (Morgue, lit. Corpse Store) (2000)
- Farbenfinsternis (Darkened Colours, lit. Colour Darkness) (2001)
- Wundwasser (lit. Wound Water) (2004)
- Blutbahnen (Blood Trails) (2007)
- Knochenkult (Bone Cult) (2008)
- Schlangensonne (lit. Snake Sun) (2010)
- Rostrot (Rust-red) (2011)
- Todestage (Dates of Death) (2013)
- Marschmusik (March Music) (2015)
- Fleischfilm (Meat Movie) (2017)
- Fegefeuer (Purgatory) (2018)
- Leblos (Lifeless) (2020)
- Grenzgänger (Border Crosser) (2023)
- Abart (2024)

=== Other releases ===
- Promo 96 (demo, 1996)
- Das Ende des Weges (The End of the Path) demo (1996) (limited to 333 copies)
- Fleischhaus (Butcher's Hall, lit. House of Flesh) (vinyl, 1997) (limited to 1,000 copies)
- Fleischfestival (Festival of Flesh) (EP, 2000)
- Lager Leipzig (Camp Leipzig) video (2001)
- Hexenhaus (Witch's Cottage) (EP + DVD, 2005)
- Eine Erhalten (Give It to Me, lit. Receive One) (EP, 2007)
- Bühnenblut (Stage Blood) (live CD, 2009)
- Madenreich – Ein Stück Rostrot (Kingdom of Maggots – A Little Rust-red) (EP, 2011)
- Krebskollektion (Cancer Collection) (compilation, 2012)
- Flötenfreunde (Friends of Flutes) (EP, 2014)
- Brummbär (Brummbär) (EP, 2015)
- Satan liebt dich (Satan Loves You) (EP, 2018)
- Bitterböse (Vicious, lit. bitterly evil) (Split, 2021)
- Wiedergänger (Revenant) (EP, 2022)

== Side projects ==
Ronny Fimmel founded a gothic metal band called Ewigheim in 1999 (Michael Roth and Theresa Trenks were featured as session musicians). Michael Roth and Michael Lenz play in a melodic death metal band called Eisblut since 2004, and Ronny Fimmel and Theresa Trenks founded Transilvanian Beat Club in 2005.
