= Cornerstone Barristers =

Barristers' chambers

- Founded: 1880
- Founder: Sir Charles Hall
- Headquarters: Gray's Inn, London
- Number of employees: 60 barristers (14 KCs) and 15 members of staff.
- Website: cornerstonebarristers.com

Cornerstone Barristers is a public law set of barristers' chambers who specialise in planning, environmental, housing, licensing, local government, court of protection and climate litigation. Philip Coppel KC and Tom Cosgrove KC are joint Heads of Chambers. The set has about 60 barristers with offices in London, Birmingham and Cardiff, and it is regulated by the Bar Standards Board.

== History ==
Cornerstone Barristers was formed in 1880 by Charles Hall, attorney-general to the Prince of Wales (later Edward VII). Graham Eyre was the Head of Chambers, before being succeeded by Anthony Scrivener in 1992.

In December 2011, 2–3 Gray's Inn Square was renamed to Cornerstone Barristers.

== Notable cases ==
In 2005, the co-head of chambers Anthony Scrivener appeared before the House of Lords on behalf of air passengers claiming airlines had caused deep vein thrombosis.

Estelle Dehon KC represented Italian investigative journalist Stefania Maurizi in her attempt to access information about WikiLeaks editors under the Freedom of Information Act 2000.

== Legal associations ==
- Planning and Environment Bar Association (PEBA)
- Honourable Society of the Inner Temple
- National Infrastructure Planning Association (NIPA)
- United Kingdom Environmental Law Association (UKELA)
- Social Housing Law Association (SHLA)
- Constitutional and Administrative Law Bar Association (ALBA)
- Property Bar Association (PBA)
- Chartered Institute of Housing (CIH)
- Court of Protection Bar Association (CPBA)
