= Cornerstone (Austrian group) =

Austrian rock band

Cornerstone, 2013.

Cornerstone, 2015.

Cornerstone is a Austrian melodic rock band. They released three albums.

The band hails from Mödling. The band is known for female singers, switching out Alina Peter with Doris Riegler in 2020. In 2021, she was replaced with Marianne Rauscha.

Their 2013 maxi-single "Smalltown Boy" featured a cover of the Bronski Beat song of the same name. All the proceeds of the single went to Nottingham City Hospital's "Room to Breathe" campaign for research and treatment of cystic fibrosis. The song charted at #50 for one week in Austria at the end of 2013.

== Discography ==
- Head Over Heels (2010)
- Somewhere in America (2011)
- Reflections (2016)

== External link ==
- Discogs

=== Further reading ===
- Review of Head Over Heels by Femme Metal Webzine
- Review of Head Over Heels by Dangerdog Music Reviews
- Review of Head Over Heels by FFM-Rock (in German)
- Review of Head Over Heels by Burn Your Ears (in German)

- Review of Somewhere in America by Stormbringer.at (in German)
- Review of Somewhere in America by Femme Metal Webzine
- Review of Somewhere in America by Dangerdog Music Reviews
- Review of Somewhere in America by Hallowed.se
- Review of Somewhere in America by Rough Edge

- Review of Reflections by Stormbringer.at (in German)
- Review of Reflections by Femme Metal Webzine
- Review of Reflections by Get Ready to Rock!
- Review of Reflections by FFM-Rock (in German)
- Review of Reflections by Hallowed.se
