= Disharmonic Orchestra =

Austrian death metal/grindcore band

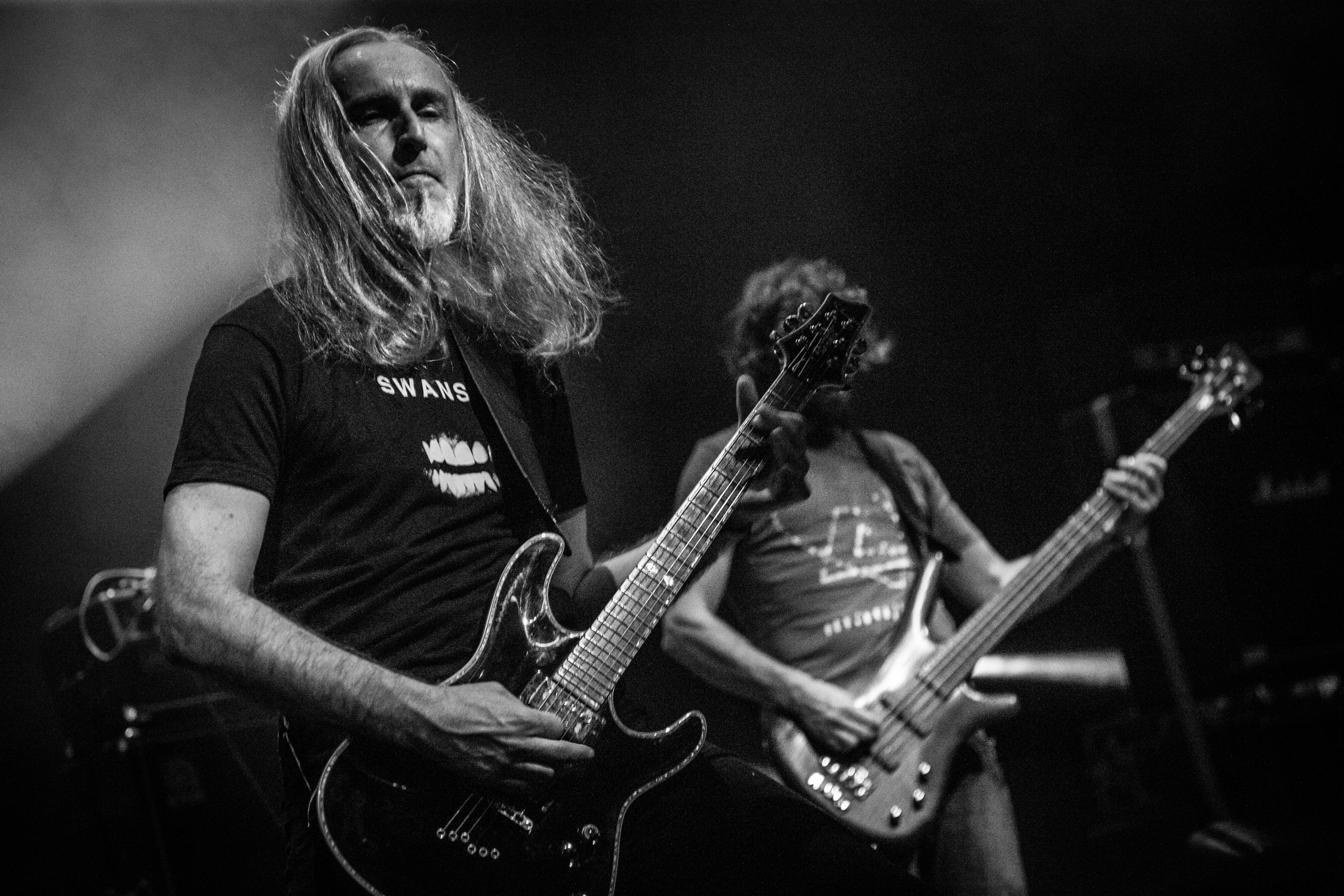
- Disharmonic Orchestra live at Eindhoven Metal Meeting, 2017

Background information
- Origin: Klagenfurt, Austria
- Genres: Death metal Grindcore; Progressive death metal Avant-garde metal
- Years active: 1987–1995, 2001–present
- Labels: Nuclear Blast; Steamhammer

Disharmonic Orchestra is an Austrian death metal/grindcore band.

== History ==
The band was formed in Klagenfurt in 1987. They recorded two demos. A show in Germany with Pungent Stench led to a deal with Nuclear Blast in 1989. The first outcome of that deal was a split with country-mates Pungent Stench. After they released two full-length albums with Nuclear Blast, they signed a new deal and released their third album on Steamhammer. The albums sound different from each other. The band took a break in 1994 . This lasted until 2002. After their debut album, Expositionsprophylaxe, had been reissued, they released the studio album Ahead.

In October 2016, after a long break, the band released the album Fear of Angst. In January 2023, the band released a compilation album of early demos, EPs, and previously unreleased recordings, Repulsive Overtones? 1988-1989 on F.O.A.D. records.

== Members ==
- Patrick Klopf – Guitars, vocals (1987–)
- Martin Messner – Drums (1987–)
- Hoimar Wotawa – Bass (2008–)

=== Former members ===
- Herald Bezdek – Guitar (1987–1988)
- Herwig Zamernik – Bass (1988–2008)

== Discography ==
- The Unequalled Visual Response Mechanism (Demo, 1988)
- Requiem for the Forest (Demo, 1988)
- Split with Pungent Stench (EP, 1989)
- Successive Substitution (EP, 1989)
- Expositionsprophylaxe (CD, 1990)
- Not to Be Undimensional Conscious (CD, 1992)
- Mind Seduction (Single, 1992)
- Pleasuredome (CD, 1993)
- Ahead (CD, 2002)
- Fear of Angst (CD, LP, 2016)
- Repulsive Overtones? 1988-1989 (Compilation CD/LP, 2023)
