= Pungent Stench =

Austrian death metal band

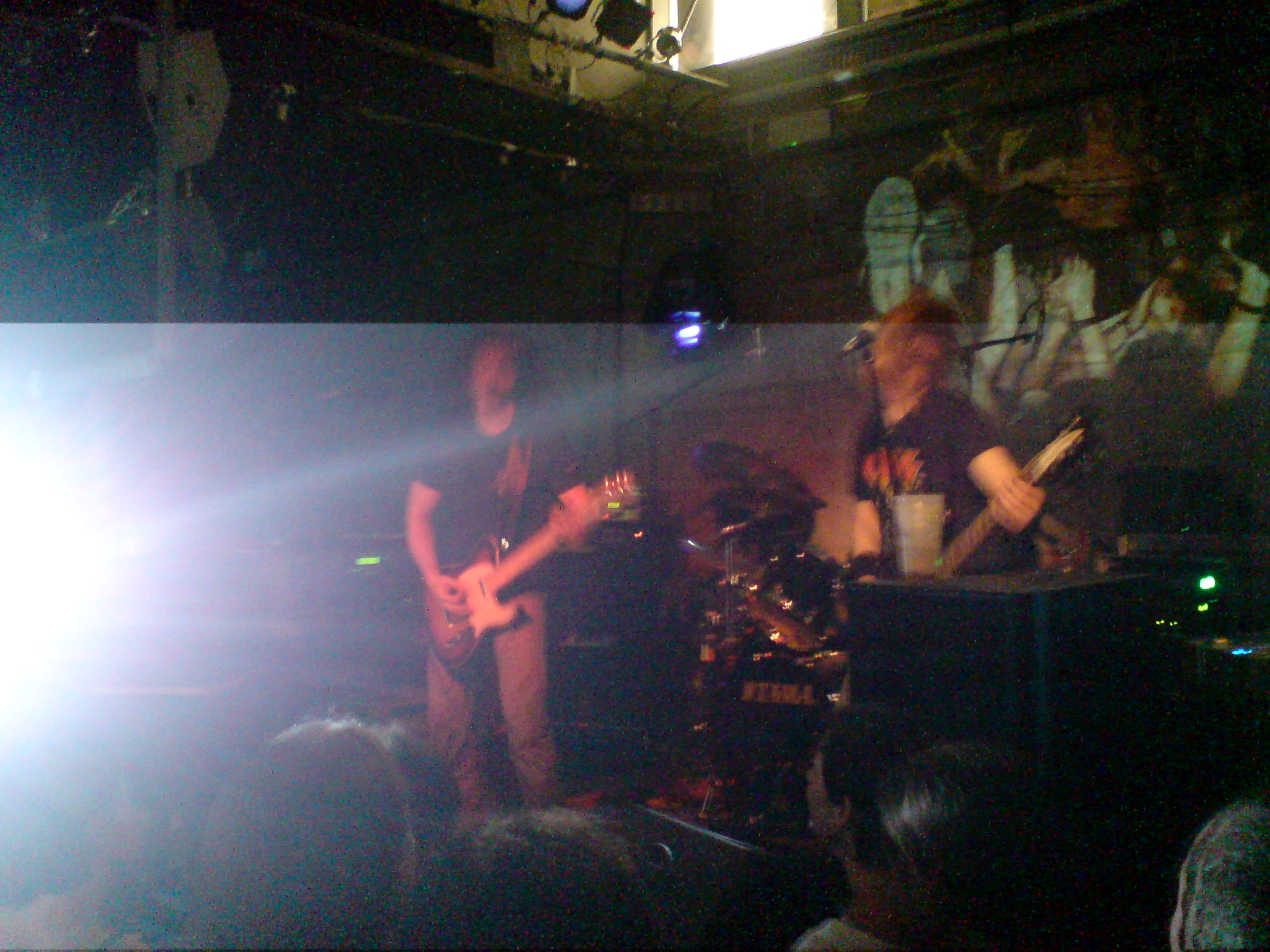
- Pungent Stench in 2007

Background information
- Origin: Vienna, Austria
- Genres: Death metal; death 'n' roll; grindcore
- Years active: 1987–1995, 1999–2007, 2013–present
- Label: Nuclear Blast
- Members: Martin Schirenc; Jacek Perkowski; Mike G. Mayhem
- Past members: Fabio Testi; Danny Vacuum; Reverend Mausna; El Gore; Alex Wank
- Website: pungentstench.org pungentstench.net

Pungent Stench is an Austrian death metal band from Vienna, formed in 1988. Their current lineup consists of Martin Schirenc (vocals/guitar), Jacek Perkowski (bass), and Mike G. Mayhem (drums). Pungent Stench's style of extreme metal and controversial lyrics that blended gore, paraphilia, and black comedy were prominent in the death metal scene. They dissolved in 1995, reformed in 1999, disbanded again in 2007 after recording a final studio album released in 2018, and reformed again as The Church of Pungent Stench in 2013 and as Schirenc Plays Pungent Stench in 2014.

== History ==
=== Early years (1987–1989) ===
Martin Schirenc and Carnage drummer Alex Wank formed Pungent Stench began in late 1987. They recruited bassist Jacek Perkowski, and by February 1988, the trio started rehearsing. A month later, the band had composed 10 songs, and by April 1988, the band recorded their first demo tape, Mucous Secretion. Recorded live in their rehearsal room, Mucous Secretion featured five tracks plus an intro taken out of the first The Evil Dead movie. The tape received positive reactions from the tapetrading community.

In July 1988, the band travelled to England to record their second demo. Wank was a guest during the mixing of Napalm Death's sophomore album, From Enslavement to Obliteration, at the Birdsong Studios in Worcester. After that, he booked two days for Pungent Stench in the same studio. The band planned to release this demo professionally, with a printed cover and manufactured tapes, but before the manufacturing process began, Pungent Stench got an offer by Nuclear Blast.

=== Nuclear Blast (1989–1994) ===
Pungent Stench was playing near Nuclear Blast's hometown, Donzdorf. The label sent someone to watch their show and relay the record company's interest. Pungent Stench signed in April 1989, and their first Nuclear Blast release, a split album with Austrian death metallers Disharmonic Orchestra, came out in June. The record was reasonably successful, selling more than 4,000 units in less than a year. The Extreme Deformity 7-inch vinyl EP, featuring three tracks from their unreleased demo, came out in September to positive reviews.

==== For God Your Soul... For Me Your Flesh ====
Pungent Stench's debut, For God Your Soul... For Me Your Flesh, was released in April 1990. Described as raw and primitive, it favores simple song structures and visceral aggression over technical proficiency and soloing. The album's title track made it to the "100 Best Death Metal Songs" list compiled by the German version of Metal Hammer.

Around the time their first record came out, Pungent Stench were an experienced live band, having played with Carcass, Entombed, Napalm Death, Extreme Noise Terror, Atrocity and Prong, among others. By the end of the year, they organized their first, six-week European tour (named the "Fleisch Tour"), with Master headlining and Paul Speckmann's thrash metal side project Abomination opening.

== Musical style and influences ==
Pungent Stench were initially inspired by early grindcore (Repulsion, Napalm Death, Terrorizer), death metal (Master, Autopsy, Slaughter, Deceased) and doom metal bands such as Saint Vitus and Witchfinder General. By the time of For God Your Soul... For Me Your Flesh's release their listening habits widened considerably. In an interview to Michigan-based fanzine Rot, drummer Alex Wank declared that he was currently into hardcore punk (Sheer Terror, Agnostic Front), industrial music (Swans, Laibach, Coil, Foetus), black metal (Mayhem, Darkthrone, Beherit), alternative metal pioneers Faith No More and "rape rock" group The Mentors.

Though Pungent Stench is a death metal band, its musical style has also been influenced by rock and blues. Such non-metal influences can be heard on songs such as "Viva la muerte", "Madcatmachopsychoromantik", "Family Man" and "Got MILF?". Schirenc's choice of guitar (he often plays a Fender Telecaster, a rarity among metal guitarists) probably signals these influences.

== Lyrical content ==
The lyrical content of the songs is more sexually and paraphilia orientated and tends to contrast the more horror and gore influenced themes of other death metal bands; themes covered include acrotomophilia, sadomasochism, coprophagia, rape, and deviance, which at times can be seen as off-putting to fans of death metal. The album covers reflect this as well: many of their album covers are transgressive and sometimes shocking photos by Joel-Peter Witkin. This, combining the musical styles of death metal and grindcore, may have influenced the sexually oriented themes of pornogrind, a subgenre of grindcore.

== Members ==
=== Current line-up ===
- Martin Schirenc (also known as El Cochino) – guitars, lead vocals (1988–1995, 1999–2007, 2013–present)
- Jacek Perkowski (also known as Pitbull Jack) – bass (1988–1995, 2023–present)
- Mike G. Mayhem – drums (2013–present)

=== Former members ===
- Fabio Testi – bass (2004)
- Danny Vacuum – bass, backing vocals (2013–2023)
- Reverend Mausna – bass (1999–2004)
- El Gore – bass (2004–2007)
- Alex Wank – drums (1988–1995, 1999–2007)

== Discography ==
- For God Your Soul... For Me Your Flesh (Nuclear Blast, 1990)
- Been Caught Buttering (Nuclear Blast, 1991)
- Dirty Rhymes & Psychotronic Beats (MCD under Nuclear Blast, 1993)
- Club Mondo Bizarre – For Members Only (Nuclear Blast, 1994)
- Praise the Names of the Musical Assassins (compilation under Nuclear Blast, 1997)
- Masters of Moral, Servants of Sin (Nuclear Blast, 2001)
- Ampeauty (2004)
- Smut Kingdom (2018, recorded in 2007)

== Video releases ==
- Video La Muerte (Nuclear Blast, VHS release, 1993) – features three music videos and eight tracks recorded live in Bremen, Germany

== Bibliography ==
- Durren, B., & Bush, R. (1990). Pungent Stench. Rot Zine, 2: 43-45.
