= 1989 in heavy metal music =

This is a timeline documenting the events of heavy metal in the year 1989.

== Newly formed bands ==
- Abhorrence
- Abruptum
- Absu
- Alleycat Scratch
- Anonymus
- Archgoat
- ASAP
- Baby Animals
- Bad Acid Trip
- Bal-Sagoth
- Beherit
- Benediction
- Bonham
- Brainstorm
- Brujeria
- Bruce Dickinson (solo career)
- Cathedral
- Cemetary
- Ceremonial Oath
- Clawfinger
- Conception
- Consolation
- Count Raven
- Cry of Love
- Cyclone Temple
- Damaged
- Damn Yankees
- Dark Tranquillity (as Septic Broiler)
- Dead Head
- Def Con Dos
- Demoncy
- Desultory
- Detritus
- diSEMBOWELMENT
- Dissection
- Doro (solo career)
- Downset.
- Dungeon
- Earth
- Earth Crisis
- Edge of Sanity
- Electric Angels
- Enchant
- Eucharist
- Exit-13
- Falkenbach
- Fear Factory
- FireHouse
- The Four Horsemen
- Galactic Cowboys
- Gamma Ray
- The Gathering
- General Surgery
- Golem
- Gore Beyond Necropsy
- Gorefest
- Gorguts
- Gruntruck
- Haggard
- Helmet
- Hum
- Human Remains
- Incantation
- Infectious Grooves
- Iniquity
- Isengard
- JBO
- Killing Addiction
- Konkhra
- Kreyson
- Last Days of Humanity
- Life of Agony
- Living Sacrifice
- Lynch Mob
- Marilyn Manson
- Mindrot
- Misanthrope
- Monster Magnet
- Morgana Lefay
- Mortician
- Motorpsycho
- My Sister's Machine
- Necromantia
- Necrophobic
- Nightstalker
- Novembers Doom
- Obscenity
- Obtained Enslavement
- Only Living Witness
- Oomph!
- Opeth
- Ophthalamia
- Pitch Shifter
- Platero y Tú
- RAMP
- Red Harvest
- Reverend
- Ringworm
- Riverdogs
- Rorschach
- Royal Hunt
- Sacrament
- Saviour Machine
- Scatterbrain
- The Scream
- Seigmen
- Sentenced
- Sex Machineguns
- Sigh
- The 69 Eyes
- Slaughter
- Spread Eagle
- Starkweather
- Steelheart
- Stone Temple Pilots
- Stuck Mojo
- Talisman
- Tang Dynasty
- Therapy?
- Thorns
- Thought Industry
- Thunder
- Tourniquet
- Turbonegro
- Type O Negative
- Unleashed
- Varga
- Vomitory
- While Heaven Wept
- The Wildhearts
- Wizard
- Wuthering Heights

== Albums ==
- 24-7 Spyz - Harder Than You
- Acid Reign - The Fear
- Accept - Eat the Heat
- Addictive - Pity of Man
- Aerosmith - Pump
- Agony Column – God, Guns and Guts
- Alias (US) – Metal to Infinity
- Alice Cooper - Prince of Darkness (comp)
- Alice Cooper - Trash
- Amulance – Feel the Pain
- Angelica – Angelica
- The Angels, aka Angel City - Beyond Salvation
- Angkor Wat – When Obscenity Becomes the Norm...Awake!
- Annihilator - Alice in Hell
- Anthem - Hunting Time
- Apollo Ra – Ra Pariah
- Atheist - Piece of Time
- Autopsy - Severed Survival
- The Awful Truth – The Awful Truth
- Babylon A.D. - Babylon A.D.
- Bad Brains - Quickness
- Badlands - Badlands
- Bang Tango – Live Injection
- Bang Tango - Psycho Café
- Barren Cross – State of Control
- Beau Nasty – Dirty But Well Dressed
- Believer - Extraction from Mortality
- Black Sabbath - Headless Cross
- Blacksmith – Fire from Within
- Blind Guardian - Follow the Blind
- Bloodgood - Out of the Darkness
- Blue Murder - Blue Murder
- Bonfire - Point Blank
- Bonham – The Disregard of Timekeeping
- Bolt Thrower - Realm of Chaos: Slaves to Darkness
- Candlemass - Tales of Creation
- Cannibal Corpse - Cannibal Corpse (demo)
- Carcass - Symphonies of Sickness
- Cats In Boots - Kicked and Klawed
- China - Sign in the Sky
- Cloven Hoof – A Sultan's Ransom
- Coroner - No More Color
- Coven - Death Walks Behind You
- Cro-Mags - Best Wishes
- Cruella – Vengeance Is Mine
- Cry Wolf - Cry Wolf
- The Cult - Sonic Temple
- Cynic - Reflections of a Dying World (demo)
- D.A.D – No Fuel Left For The Pilgrims
- Damien - Stop This War
- Danger Danger - Danger Danger
- Dangerous Toys - Dangerous Toys
- Dark Angel - Leave Scars
- D.D.T. - Victims
- Dead Horse – Horsecore: An Unrelated Story That's Time Consuming
- Dead Brain Cells - Universe
- Deliverance - Deliverance
- Destruction - Live Without Sense (live)
- Devastation – Signs of Life
- Doro - Force Majeure
- Dream Theater - When Dream and Day Unite
- D.R.I. - Thrash Zone
- Dirty Blonde – Passion
- Dirty Looks – Turn of the Screw
- Dyoxen - First Among Equals
- Earthshaker - Treachery
- Electric Boys - Funk-O-Metal Carpet Ride
- Entombed - But Life Goes On (demo)
- Enuff Z'Nuff - Enuff Z'Nuff
- Equinox - Auf Wiedersehen
- Evildead - Annihilation of Civilization
- Excel - The Joke's on You
- Exodus - Fabulous Disaster
- Extreme - Extreme
- EZO - Fire Fire
- Faith No More - The Real Thing
- Faster Pussycat – Wake Me When Its Over
- Fates Warning - Perfect Symmetry
- Fifth Angel – Time Will Tell
- Fongus - Sobredosis De Metal
- Forbidden - Raw Evil: Live at the Dynamo (EP)
- Forced Entry – Uncertain Future
- The Four Horsemen – The Four Horsemen (EP)
- The Front - The Front
- Gammacide – Victims of Science
- Glory – Danger In this Game
- Grave - Anatomia Corporis Humani (demo)
- Great White - ...Twice Shy
- Grinder - Dead End
- Godflesh - Streetcleaner
- Gorky Park - Gorky Park
- Guardian - First Watch
- Gun – Taking On the World
- Heavy Pettin' – Big Bang
- Heavens Gate – In Control
- Heir Apparent - One Small Voice
- Helix - Over 60 minutes with...
- Helloween - Live in the U.K. (live)
- Helstar - Nosferatu
- Hermética - Hermética
- Holy Moses - The New Machine of Lichtenstein
- Howe II – High Gear
- Icon - Right Between the Eyes
- Intruder - "A Higher Form of Killing"
- Jailhouse - Alive In A Mad World (EP)
- Jersey Dogs – Don't Worry, Get Angry! (EP)
- Junkyard – Junkyard
- Keel - Larger Than Live
- King Diamond - Conspiracy
- Kingdom Come - In Your Face
- King's X - Gretchen Goes to Nebraska
- Kiss - Hot in the Shade
- Kreator - Extreme Aggression
- Korzus - Pay For Your Lies (EP)
- Richie Kotzen – Richie Kotzen
- L.A. Guns - Cocked & Loaded
- Lȧȧz Rockit - Annihilation Principle
- Lȧȧz Rockit - Holiday In Cambodia (EP)
- Last Crack - Sinister Funkhouse #17
- Leatherwolf - Street Ready
- Lillian Axe – Love + War
- Little Caesar – Name Your Poison (EP)
- Living Death - Worlds Neuroses
- Lizzy Borden - Master of Disguise
- Lobotomia - Nada É Como Parece
- Loudness - Soldier of Fortune
- Macabre - Gloom
- Yngwie Malmsteen - Trial by Fire: Live in Leningrad
- Marchello – Destiny
- Marshall Law – Marshall Law
- Alex Masi – Attack of the Neon Shark
- Massacra - Nearer from Death (demo)
- Masters of Reality – Masters of Reality
- McAuley Schenker Group - Save Yourself
- Mekong Delta - The Principle of Doubt
- Mercy – King Doom
- Meshuggah – Meshuggah, aka Psykisk Testbild (EP)
- Metal Massacre - Metal Massacre X (Compilation, various artists)
- Metal Church - Blessing in Disguise
- Michael Monroe – Not Fakin It
- Midas Touch – Presage to Disaster
- Mindless (Sinner) - Missin' Pieces
- Ministry - The Mind Is a Terrible Thing to Taste
- Morbid Angel - Altars of Madness
- Mordred – Fools Game
- Morgoth - Resurrection Absurd (EP)
- Mortal Sin - Face of Despair
- Mortem - Slow Death
- Mr. Big - Mr. Big
- Mötley Crüe - Dr. Feelgood
- Mystic-Force – Take Command (EP)
- Napalm - Cruel Tranquility
- Nasty Savage – Penetration Point
- Nine Inch Nails - Pretty Hate Machine
- Nirvana (band) - Bleach
- Nitro - O.F.R.
- Nuclear Assault - Handle with Care
- Obituary - Slowly We Rot
- The Obsessed – The Obsessed
- Oliver Magnum – Oliver Magnum
- Onslaught - In Search of Sanity
- Overkill - The Years of Decay
- Paradox – Heresy
- Pariah – Blaze of Obscurity
- Pestilence - Consuming Impulse
- Phantom Blue - Phantom Blue
- Poltergeist – Depression
- Pretty Boy Floyd - Leather Boyz With Electric Toyz
- Primus - Suck on This (live)
- Princess Pang - Self Titled album
- Rage - Secrets in a Weird World
- Repulsion - Horrified
- Reverend - Reverend (EP)
- Rotting Christ - The Other Side of Life (split EP with Sound Pollution)
- Rigor Mortis - Freaks (EP)
- Riot – Riot Live
- Rollins Band - Hard Volume
- Running Wild - Death or Glory
- Rush - A Show of Hands (live)
- Rush - Presto
- Sabbat - Dreamweaver (Reflections of Our Yesterdays)
- Sacred Reich - Alive at the Dynamo (EP)
- Sacred Warrior – Master's Command
- Sacrilege - Turn Back Trilobite
- Saint Vitus - V
- Saraya - Saraya
- Sarcófago - Rotting (EP)
- Joe Satriani - Flying in a Blue Dream
- Savatage - Gutter Ballet
- Scanner - terminal Earth
- Scorpions – Best of Rockers and Ballads
- Sea Hags – Sea Hags
- Sepultura - Beneath the Remains
- Shakin' Street – Live and Raw!
- Shark Island – Law of the Order
- Shotgun Messiah – Shotgun Messiah
- Shout – In Your Face
- Signal - Loud & Clear
- Silent Rage - Don't Touch Me There
- Skid Row - Skid Row
- Sodom - Agent Orange
- Soundgarden - Louder Than Love
- Jack Starr's Burning Starr – Jack Starr's Burning Starr
- Steve Stevens – Atomic Playboys
- Stone - No Anaesthesia!
- Stratovarius - Fright Night
- Suicidal Tendencies - Controlled by Hatred/Feel Like Shit...Déjà Vu
- Sweaty Nipples – Straight Outta Portland
- Tankard - Hair of the Dog (comp)
- Terrorizer - World Downfall
- Tesla - The Great Radio Controversy
- Testament - Practice What You Preach
- Thanatos - Omnicoitor (demo)
- Titan Force – Titan Force
- TNT – Intuition
- Tora Tora – Surprise Attack
- Toxik - Think This
- Trance – Back in Trance
- T.T. Quick – Sloppy Seconds
- Tyrranicide - God Save the Scene
- U.D.O - Mean Machine
- Unseen Terror - The Peel Sessions
- Vader - Necrolust (demo)
- Vain – No Respect
- Venom - Prime Evil
- Victory – Culture Killed the Native
- Viking - Man of Straw
- Viper - Theatre of Fate
- Voivod - Nothingface
- W.A.S.P. - The Headless Children
- Warrant - Dirty Rotten Filthy Stinking Rich
- Watchtower - Control and Resistance
- Wehrmacht - Biermacht
- Whiplash – Insult to Injury
- White Lion - Big Game
- Whitesnake - Slip of the Tongue
- White Zombie - Make Them Die Slowly
- Winter - Hour of Doom (demo)
- Wrathchild America - Climbin' the Walls
- Xentrix - Shattered Existence
- X Japan - Blue Blood
- XYZ - XYZ
- Zed Yago – Pilgrimage
- Zion - Thunder From the Mountain

== Disbandments ==
- Cacophony
- Destruction (Schmier leaves the band)
- Dokken (reformed in 1993)
- Lion
- Osmi Putnik (reformed in 2002)
- Quiet Riot (reformed in 1991)

== Events ==
- Primus records their live album Suck on This at Berkeley Square in Berkeley, California on February 25 and March 5.
- Mötley Crüe's album Dr. Feelgood reaches number one on the Billboard Top 100.
- Bon Jovi, Cinderella, Ozzy Osbourne, Scorpions, Mötley Crüe, and Skid Row take part in the Moscow Music Peace Festival on August 12 & August 13, 1989.
- For the first time in its history, a Grammy is given for Best Hard Rock/Metal Performance. The award is given to Jethro Tull for Crest of a Knave.
- Jason Becker is diagnosed with ALS.
- Faith No More, Soundgarden and Voivod embark on a U.S. tour together.
- Future Metallica bassist Robert Trujillo joins Suicidal Tendencies (and remains with them until their split in 1995). Following his participation, the band would abandon their hardcore punk style and become more of a thrash metal/funk metal band.
- Steve Vai leaves David Lee Roth's solo band and joins Whitesnake.
- Rick Rozz leaves Death and is replaced by then-future Obituary and Testament guitarist James Murphy. The new Death line-up (Chuck Schuldiner/James Murphy/Terry Butler/Bill Andrews) eventually records a new album that would be released next year.
- Jethro Tull is awarded "Best Hard Rock/Metal Performance Vocal or Instrumental" to boos from the audience at the 31st Grammy Awards.

Preceded by 1988	Heavy Metal Timeline; 1989	Succeeded by 1990
