= 1990 in heavy metal music =

This is a timeline documenting the events of heavy metal in the year 1990.

== Newly formed bands ==
- 21 Guns
- Allegiance
- Amorphis
- Anathema
- Antestor
- Ark
- Arghoslent
- ASKA
- At the Gates
- Bad Moon Rising
- Barathrum
- Beyond Dawn
- Body Count (by rapper Ice-T)
- Brutal Truth
- Buzzoven
- Centinex
- Channel Zero
- Chokehold
- Christ Agony
- Comecon
- Contraband
- Converge
- Crowbar
- The Crown
- Dark Heresy
- Dog Eat Dog
- Dawn
- Dead Infection
- Demigod
- Demilich
- Disbelief
- Exhumed
- Finger Eleven
- God Dethroned
- The God Machine
- Green Carnation
- Haemorrhage
- Hate
- Impaled Nazarene
- Impiety
- In Flames
- Isole
- Krisiun
- Lacrimosa
- Local H
- Lost Horizon (then known as Highlander)
- Lost Soul
- Man Is the Bastard
- Marduk
- Merauder
- Mirror of Deception
- Monstrosity
- Morgion
- Morpheus Descends
- My Dying Bride
- Nifelheim
- Nocturnal Rites
- Novembre
- Osvajači
- Pan.Thy.Monium
- Paragon
- Penance
- Quicksand
- Regurgitate
- Roxy Blue
- Runemagick
- Seance
- Septicflesh
- Shadow King
- Skrew
- Skyclad
- Sleep
- Slough Feg
- Solstice
- Subway To Sally
- Sugartooth
- Suiciety
- The Tea Party
- Temple of the Dog
- Thergothon
- Tool
- Torture Squad
- Tourniquet
- Winter's Bane

== Albums & EPs ==
- 24-7 Spyz – Gumbo Millennium
- AC/DC – The Razors Edge
- Agony Column – Comes Alive (EP) (live)
- Alice in Chains – Facelift
- Aggressor – Indestructible (demo)
- Anacrusis – Reason
- Angkor Wat – Corpus Christi
- Annihilator – Never, Neverland
- Anthem – No Smoke Without Fire
- Anthrax – Persistence of Time
- Apocrypha – Area 54
- Artillery – By Inheritance
- Asphalt Ballet – Asphalt Ballet (album)
- Atrocity – Hallucinations
- Atrophy – Violent by Nature
- Cronos - Dancing In the Fire
- The Bang Gang – Love Sells...
- Barren Cross – Hotter Than Hell Live! (live)
- Bathory – Hammerheart
- Baton Rouge – Shake Your Soul
- Believer – Sanity Obscure
- Benediction - Subconscious Terror
- Biohazard – Biohazard
- Bitter End – Harsh Realities
- The Black Crowes – Shake Your Money Maker
- Black Sabbath – Tyr
- Blasphemy - Fallen Angel of Doom
- Blind Guardian – Tales from the Twilight World
- Blue Cheer – Highlights and Lowlives
- Adam Bomb – Pure S.E.X
- Jon Bon Jovi – Blaze of Glory
- Cancer – To the Gory End
- Cannibal Corpse – Eaten Back to Life
- Carnage – Dark Recollections
- Celtic Frost – Vanity/Nemesis
- Chastain – For Those Who Dare
- Child'ƨ Play – Rat Race
- Cinderella – Heartbreak Station
- Cold Sweat – Break Out
- Count Raven - Storm Warning
- Cry Wolf – Crunch
- Damn Yankees – Damn Yankees
- Danzig – Danzig II: Lucifuge
- Deliverance – Weapons of Our Warfare
- Death – Spiritual Healing
- Death Angel – Act III
- Deicide – Deicide
- Destruction – Cracked Brain
- Bruce Dickinson – Tattooed Millionaire
- Dio – Lock Up the Wolves
- Don Dokken – Up from the Ashes
- Earthshaker – Pretty Good!
- Electric Angels – Electric Angels
- Electric Boys – Funk-O-Metal Carpet Ride
- Entombed – Left Hand Path
- Eternal Ryte - World requiem
- Exhorder – Slaughter in the Vatican
- Extreme – Pornograffitti
- Exodus – Impact Is Imminent
- Eyehategod – In the Name of Suffering
- Fastway – Bad Bad Girls
- Flotsam and Jetsam – When the Storm Comes Down
- Forbidden – Twisted into Form
- FireHouse – FireHouse
- Michael Lee Firkins – Michael Lee Firkins
- Gamma Ray – Heading for Tomorrow
- Grinder – The 1st EP (EP)
- Gwar – Scumdogs of the Universe
- Harter Attack – Human Hell
- Heavens Edge – Heavens Edge
- Heavens Gate – Open the Gate and Watch! (EP)
- Hellion – The Black Book
- Helmet – Strap It On
- Hericane Alice – Tear the House Down
- Hexx – Watery Graves (EP)
- Holy Moses – World Chaos
- Holy Soldier – Holy Soldier
- House of Lords – Sahara
- Iced Earth – Iced Earth
- Impetigo - Ultimo Mondo Cannibale
- Inquisidor - Sobre Tu Cadaver (demo)
- Iron Maiden – No Prayer for the Dying
- Intrinsic – Distortion of Perspective (EP)
- Jane's Addiction – Ritual de lo Habitual
- Jersey Dogs – Thrash Ranch
- Jetboy – Damned Nation
- Judas Priest – Painkiller
- Killer Dwarfs - Dirty Weapons
- Killing Joke – Extremities, Dirt & Various Repressed Emotions
- Kill For Thrills – Dynamite from Nightmareland
- King Diamond – The Eye
- King's X – Faith Hope Love
- Krokus - Stampede
- Jeffrey Kollman – Schizoid
- Richie Kotzen – Fever Dream
- Kreator – Coma of Souls
- Krokus – Stampede
- Kyuss – Sons of Kyuss (EP)
- Laos – We Want It
- Legs Diamond – Town Bad Girl
- Little Caesar – Little Caesar
- Living Colour – Time's Up
- London – Playa Del Rock
- Lostboys – Lost and Found
- Love/Hate – Blackout in the Red Room
- Lynch Mob – Wicked Sensation
- Tony MacAlpine – Eyes of the World
- Frank Marino – From the Hip
- Master – Master
- Yngwie Malmsteen – Eclipse
- Manilla Road - The Courts of Chaos
- Manitoba's Wild Kingdom – ...And You?
- Alex Masi – Vertical Invader
- Megadeth – Rust in Peace
- Meliah Rage – Solitary Solitude
- Monster Magnet – Monster Magnet (EP)
- Morbid Saint – Spectrum of Death
- Mortician - Brutally Mutilated
- Morgana Lefay – Symphony of the Damned
- Morgoth - The Eternal Fall (EP)
- Mystic-Force – Take Command - The Demo Years (compilation)
- Napalm Death – Harmony Corruption
- Neurosis – The Word as Law
- 9.0 – Too Far Gone
- Nocturnus – The Key
- Non-Fiction – Non-Fiction (EP)
- John Norum – Live in Stockholm (live EP)
- Obituary – Cause of Death
- Opprobrium – Beyond the Unknown (as Incubus)
- Pantera – Cowboys from Hell
- Paradise Lost – Lost Paradise
- Poison – Flesh & Blood
- Chris Poland – Return to Metalopolis
- Praying Mantis & Paul Di'Anno, Dennis Stratton – Live at Last (live)
- Pretty Maids – Jump the Gun
- Primus – Frizzle Fry
- Prong – Beg to Differ
- Psychotic Waltz – A Social Grace
- Pungent Stench - For God Your Soul... For Me Your Flesh
- Queensrÿche – Empire
- Quicksand – Quicksand (EP)
- Quiet Riot – Winners Take All
- Quireboys – A Bit of What You Fancy
- Rage – Reflections of a Shadow
- Ratt – Detonator
- Realm – Suiciety
- Razor - Shotgun Justice
- Recon – Behind Enemy Lines
- Reverend – World Won't Miss You
- Rhino Bucket – Rhino Bucket
- Riot – The Privilege of Power
- Riverdogs – Riverdogs
- Sacred Reich – The American Way
- Sacred Warrior – Wicked Generation
- Sacrifice – Soldiers of Misfortune
- Sadus – Swallowed in Black
- Saint Vitus - V
- Salty Dog – Every Dog Has Its Day
- Sanctuary – Into the Mirror Black
- Scatterbrain – Here Comes Trouble
- Scorpions – Crazy World
- Slaughter – Stick It to Ya
- Slaughter – Stick It Live (live EP)
- Slayer – Seasons in the Abyss
- Sleeze Beez – Screwed Blued and Tattooed
- Sodom - Better Off Dead
- Sons of Angels – Sons of Angels
- Soundgarden – Screaming Life/Fopp
- Spread Eagle – Spread Eagle
- Steelheart – Steelheart
- Steve Vai – Passion and Warfare
- Stone – Colours
- Stryper – Against the Law
- Suicidal Tendencies – Lights...Camera...Revolution!
- Sweet F.A. – Stick To Your Guns
- Talisman – Talisman
- Tankard – The Meaning of Life
- Tesla – Five Man Acoustical Jam (live)
- Thunder – Backstreet Symphony
- Tiamat - Sumerian Cry
- Tigertailz – Bezerk
- Testament – Souls of Black
- Tourniquet – Stop the Bleeding
- Trixter – Trixter
- Trouble – Trouble
- U.D.O. – Faceless World
- V2 – Out to Launch
- Vader – Morbid Reich (demo)
- Vengeance Rising – Once Dead
- Vicious Rumors – Vicious Rumors
- Vio-lence – Oppressing the Masses
- Vow Wow – Mountain Top
- Bill Ward - Ward One: Along the Way
- Warfare – Hammer Horror
- Warrant – Cherry Pie
- Warrior Soul – Last Decade Dead Century
- Winger – In the Heart of the Young
- Winter - Into Darkness
- WWIII – World War III
- Xentrix – For Whose Advantage?
- Xysma – Above the Mind of Morbidity
- Y&T – Ten
- Zebra – Live (live)

== Disbandments ==
- Atrophy (reformed in 2015)
- Griva

== Events ==
- Adrian Smith, Iron Maiden's lead guitarist, leaves the band to pursue a solo career. Janick Gers is hired to replace him.
- Metallica wins the first ever Grammy award in the category of Best Metal Performance for the song "One."
- The infamous Clash of the Titans tour is this year, headlined by bands such as Slayer, Megadeth, Anthrax, Testament, Suicidal Tendencies, and others.
- August 7: Extreme release their second album Pornograffitti. The album peaked at number 10 on the Billboard 200 album chart and sold very well, due to the success of its single "More Than Words", which reached #1 on the Billboard Hot 100 chart a year later.
- Judas Priest was involved in a multimillion-dollar lawsuit involving two Nevada teenager suicides allegedly caused by the song "Better by You, Better than Me". The band won the case.
- Faith No More's The Real Thing, carried by the single "Epic", also cracks the Billboard Top 10.
- Marty Friedman joins Megadeth replacing Jeff Young on guitar.
- Possessed frontman, Jeff Becerra is paralyzed from the waist down after being shot in a mugging on his way home from work.
- Lȧȧz Rockit, Death Angel, Sacred Reich and others are featured on the soundtrack of Leatherface: The Texas Chainsaw Massacre III.

Preceded by 1989	Heavy Metal Timeline; 1990	Succeeded by 1991
