= 1991 in heavy metal music =

This is a timeline documenting the events of heavy metal in the year 1991.

== Newly formed bands ==
- 108
- A.N.I.M.A.L.
- Acid Bath
- Acrimony
- All Out War
- Angra
- Anorexia Nervosa
- Arcade
- Arcturus
- Atomic Opera
- Avulsed
- Beheaded
- Behemoth
- Betrayer, who assumed the name Belphegor in 1993
- Bangalore Choir
- Bethlehem
- Blood Duster
- Burzum
- Clutch
- Coaltar of the Deepers
- Cradle of Filth
- Crash
- Creepmime
- Crematory
- Criminal
- Crimson Thorn
- Damn the Machine
- Defleshed
- Deranged
- Down
- Dreams of Sanity
- Dying Fetus
- Eldritch
- Emperor
- Enslaved
- Eternal Elysium
- Eternal Oath
- Evocation
- Far
- Fair Warning
- Fatal Opera
- Fear of God
- Fleurety
- Funeral
- godheadSilo
- Graveland
- Grief
- Gut
- H-Blockx
- Hank Williams III
- Hardline
- HIM
- Hypocrisy
- Ildjarn
- Illdisposed
- Immortal
- Immortal Souls
- Incubus (not to be confused with the thrash metal Incubus)
- Jackyl
- Kalmah
- Kataklysm
- Katatonia
- Kazik na Żywo
- Labyrinth
- Machine Head
- Mercenary
- Morgul
- Mütiilation
- Nevermore
- Nightfall
- Oasis
- Oppressor
- Orphaned Land
- Pain of Salvation
- Paramæcium
- Peach
- Poema Arcanus
- Poverty's No Crime
- Powerman 5000
- Pride & Glory
- Pro-Pain
- Pyogenesis
- Rage Against the Machine
- Sadist
- Saturnus
- Satyricon
- Scorn
- Skepticism
- Skin Chamber
- Snapcase
- Stormlord
- Strife
- Svartsyn
- Tad Morose
- Unbroken
- Unruly Child
- Visceral Evisceration
- Widowmaker
- Zimmers Hole

== Albums & EPs ==
- Altered State – Altered State
- Anacrusis – Manic Impressions
- Anthrax – Attack of the Killer B's (comp)
- Armed Forces – Take On the Nation
- Armored Saint – Symbol of Salvation
- Artch – For the Sake of Mankind
- Asphyx - The Rack
- Assück - Anticapital
- At the Gates - Gardens of Grief (EP)
- Atheist – Unquestionable Presence
- Atomgod – History Re-Written
- Attomica - Disturbing The Noise
- Autopsy – Mental Funeral
- Badlands – Voodoo Highway
- Bad Moon Rising – Full Moon Fever (EP)
- Bad Moon Rising – Bad Moon Rising
- Bang Tango – Dancin' on Coals
- Bathory – Twilight of the Gods
- Baton Rouge – Lights Out on the Playground
- Benediction - The Grand Leveller
- Blackeyed Susan – Electric Rattlebone
- Bolt Thrower – War Master
- Bonham – Mad Hatter (album)
- Bulletboys – Freakshow
- Cancer - Death Shall Rise
- Cannibal Corpse – Butchered at Birth
- Carcass - Necroticism – Descanting the Insalubrious
- Cathedral – Forest of Equilibrium
- China – Go All the Way
- Civil Defiance – Abstract Reaction (EP)
- Conception – The last Sunset
- Confessor – Condemned
- Contraband – Contraband
- Alice Cooper – Hey Stoopid
- Coroner – Mental Vortex
- Corrosion of Conformity – Blind
- Crimson Glory – Strange and Beautiful
- Crowbar – Obedience thru Suffering
- The Cult – Ceremony
- Cycle Sluts from Hell – Cycle Sluts from Hell
- Cyclone Temple – I Hate Therefore I Am
- D.A.D – Riskin It All
- Danger Danger – Screw it
- Dangerous Toys – Hellacious Acres
- Darkthrone – Soulside Journey
- Dark Angel – Time Does Not Heal
- Death – Human
- Deceased - Luck of the Corpse
- Deceased - Gut Wrench (EP)
- Deliverance – What a Joke
- Demolition Hammer – Tortured Existence
- Devastation – Idolatry
- Dirty Looks – Bootlegs
- Dismember – Like an Ever Flowing Stream
- Edge of Sanity - Nothing But Death Remains
- Emperor (US) – After the Storm (EP)
- Entombed – Clandestine
- Europe – Prisoners in Paradise
- Evildead – The Underworld
- Fates Warning – Parallels
- Fear of God – Within the Veil
- Follow for Now – Follow for Now
- The Four Horsemen – Nobody Said it Was Easy
- Galactic Cowboys – Galactic Cowboys
- Gamma Ray – Sigh No More
- General Surgery - Necrology (EP)
- Glory – 2 Forgive Is 2 Forget
- Golgotha -Wet Dreams of the Insane
- Gorguts - Considered Dead
- Grave - Into the Grave
- Grinder – Nothing Is Sacred
- Guns N' Roses – Use Your Illusion I and II
- Hammers Rule – Spontaneous Human Combustion
- Heathen – Victims of Deception
- Heavens Gate – Livin' in Hysteria
- Helloween – Pink Bubbles Go Ape
- Hexx – Morbid Reality
- Howe II – Now Hear This
- Iced Earth – Night of the Stormrider
- Ignorance – The Confident Rat
- Immolation – Dawn of Possession
- I, Napoleon – I, Napoleon
- Infectious Grooves – The Plague That Makes Your Booty Move...It's the Infectious Grooves
- Integrity – Those Who Fear Tomorrow
- Into Another – Into Another
- Intruder – Psycho Savant
- Kik Tracee – No Rules
- KingOfTheHill – Kingofthehill
- Kix – Hot Wire
- Richie Kotzen – Electric Joy
- Kyuss – Wretch
- Lacrimosa – Angst
- L.A. Guns – Hollywood Vampires
- Last Crack – Burning Time
- Loudness – On the Prowl
- Makina - Dilemma
- Malevolent Creation - The Ten Commandments
- Yngwie Malmsteen – The Yngwie Malmsteen Collection (comp)
- Massacre - From Beyond
- Master - On The Seventh Day God Created...Master
- Master's Hammer – Ritual
- Matthias Steele – Haunting Tales of a Warrior's Past
- McAuley Schenker Group – M.S.G.
- McQueen Street – McQueen Street
- Meshuggah – Contradictions Collapse
- Metal Church – The Human Factor
- Metal Massacre - Metal Massacre XI (Compilation, various artists)
- Metallica – Metallica
- Mind Funk – Mind Funk
- Monster Magnet – 25...Tab
- Monster Magnet – Spine of God
- Vinnie Moore – Meltdown
- Morbid Angel – Abominations of Desolation
- Morbid Angel – Blessed Are the Sick
- Morgoth - Cursed
- Mortal Sin – Every Dog Has Its Day
- Mortification – Mortification
- Mortician - Mortal Massacre
- Mötley Crüe – Decade of Decadence (comp)
- Motörhead – 1916
- Mr. Big – Lean into It
- Mr. Bungle – Mr. Bungle
- Nazareth - No Jive
- Non-Fiction – Preface
- Nuclear Assault – Out of Order
- The Obsessed – Lunar Womb
- Osiris – Futurity and Human Depressions
- Overkill – Horrorscope
- Ozzy Osbourne – No More Tears
- Panic – Epidemic
- Paradise Lost – Gothic
- Pearl Jam – Ten
- Pestilence - Testimony of the Ancients
- Phantom – Phantom
- Pitchshifter – Industrial
- Poison – Swallow This Live (live)
- Poltergeist – Behind My Mask
- Powersurge – MCMXCI
- Praying Mantis – Predator in Disguise
- Primus – Sailing the Seas of Cheese
- Prong – Prove You Wrong
- Pungent Stench - Been Caught Buttering
- Queen – Greatest Hits II
- Queen – Innuendo
- Rage – Extended Power (EP)
- Ratt – Ratt & Roll 81-91 (comp)
- Red Hot Chili Peppers - Blood Sugar Sex Magik
- Reverend – Play God
- Ripping Corpse - Dreaming with the Dead
- Running Wild - The First Years of Piracy (comp)
- Kane Roberts – Saints and Sinners
- Stephen Ross – Midnight Drive
- David Lee Roth – A Little Ain't Enough
- Rotting Christ – Passage to Arcturo (EP)
- Root – Hell Symphony
- Rush – Roll the Bones
- Saigon Kick – Saigon Kick
- Sabbat – Envenom
- Samael – Worship Him
- Savatage – Streets: A Rock Opera
- Temple of the Dog – Temple of the Dog
- The Scream – Let It Scream
- The Screaming Jets – All for One
- Sentenced - Shadows of the Past
- Sepultura – Arise
- Slik Toxik – Smooth And Deadly (EP)
- Skid Row – Slave to the Grind
- Skyclad – The Wayward Sons of Mother Earth
- Slayer – Decade of Aggression (live)
- Solitude Aeturnus – Into the Depths of Sorrow
- Soundgarden – Badmotorfinger
- Stone – Emotional Playground
- Stryper – Can't Stop the Rock (comp)
- Suffocation – Effigy of the Forgotten
- Tesla – Psychotic Supper
- Therapy? – Baby Teeth
- Therion - Of Darkness...
- The Throbs – The Language of Thieves and Vgabonds
- Thin Lizzy – Dedication: The Very Best of Thin Lizzy (comp)
- Thorns – Grymyrk (demo)
- Tiamat - The Astral Sleep
- Titan Force – Winner/Loser
- Tourniquet – Psycho Surgery
- Tórr – Institut Klinické Smirti
- Tuff – What Comes Around Goes Around
- Tyketto – Don't Come Easy
- Type O Negative – Slow, Deep and Hard
- U.D.O. – Timebomb
- Ugly Kid Joe – As Ugly as They Wanna Be
- Unleashed - Where No Life Dwells
- Van Halen – For Unlawful Carnal Knowledge
- Velvet Viper – Velvet Viper
- Vengeance Rising - Destruction Comes
- Vicious Rumors – Welcome to the Ball
- Voivod – Angel Rat
- War Babies – War Babies
- Warrior Soul – Drugs, God and the New Republic
- White Lion – Mane Attraction
- Wrathchild America – 3-D
- Xentrix – Dilute to Taste (EP)
- XYZ – Hungry

== Disbandments ==
- Death Angel (reformed in 2001)
- Whitesnake (reformed in 2002)
- Sanctuary (reformed in 2010)

== Events ==
- Poison fires guitarist CC DeVille. Conflict between Michaels and DeVille culminated in a fistfight backstage at the 1991 MTV Video Music Awards, provoked by DeVille's inept live performance. After bringing "Unskinny Bop" to a grinding halt, DeVille launched into "Talk Dirty To Me", forcing the band to switch songs in mid-performance. Deville was fired and replaced by Pennsylvanian guitarist Richie Kotzen.
- Queen releases Innuendo.
- November 24: Queen's Freddie Mercury dies of AIDS induced bronchial pneumonia.
- Def Leppard guitarist Steve Clark dies on January 8 due to compression of the brain stem from excessive alcohol mixed with anti-depressants and painkillers (as a result of a rib injury).
- Queen's "Bohemian Rhapsody" goes to number one in the UK for the second time, the only song to ever go to number one more than once in the same version. It has now spent 14 weeks at number one.
- Extreme's hit single "More Than Words" reaches number one on the United States Billboard Hot 100 chart. This brought the band to their first mainstream success in North America.
- KISS Drummer - Eric Carr dies at age 41 on November 24 (The same day as Freddie Mercury). As a tribute, the group's 1992 release Revenge featured what is said to be the only drum solo Carr ever recorded with the band, which was titled "Carr Jam 1981".
- Skid Row's second album Slave to the Grind becomes the only 90s classic heavy metal album to debut at No.1 in the Billboard music charts in the 90s.
- Metallica's self-titled Black Album becomes the first album by a thrash metal band to hit No.1 in the Billboard music charts.
- Guns N' Roses set a record when their albums Use Your Illusion I and Use Your Illusion II debut at the top two positions of the Billboard 200, the only time a rock band has ever achieved this
- Mayhem's vocalist, Per Yngve Ohlin aka Dead, kills himself by shooting himself in the head with a shotgun and slitting his wrists and throat with a hunting knife. He left a note reading "excuse all the blood". Photographs of his corpse taken by bandmate, Euronymous, were later used as cover art for the bootleg album Dawn of the Black Hearts.
- Europe release the 5th album titled Prisoners in Paradise. It's Europe's last studio album before they decide to take a long break.
- "Monsters in Moscow" takes place at Moscow's Tushino Airfield featuring AC/DC, The Black Crowes, EST, Metallica and Pantera.

Preceded by 1990	Heavy Metal Timeline; 1991	Succeeded by 1992
