= Live to Die =

Live to Die may refer to:

- Live to Die (Intruder album), 1987
- Live to Die (Bride album), 1988
