= A Higher Form of Killing =

Studio album by Intruder
- Released: August 1989
- Recorded: Treasure Isle Recorders, Nashville
- Genre: Thrash metal
- Length: 46:34
- Label: Metal Blade, Lost and Found Records
- Producer: Tom Harding

Intruder chronology
Live to Die (1987)	A Higher Form of Killing (1989)	Psycho Savant (1991)

A Higher Form of Killing is the second studio album by the metal band, Intruder. It marks their departure from the speed metal sound displayed on their previous album in favor of a thrash metal sound. Unlike their previous album which was recorded as a four-piece band, this album was recorded as a quintet with the addition of Greg Messick on rhythm guitar.

It was originally released in 1989 by Metal Blade and Roadrunner Records, but was reissued on Lost and Found Records in 2005, limited to 1,000 copies.

Its title is taken from a quotation from Fritz Haber about the use of poison gas in warfare.

== Track listing ==
1. "Time of Trouble" – 00:53
2. "The Martyr" – 06:02
3. "Genetic Genocide" – 06:03
4. "Second Chance" – 06:06
5. "(I'm Not Your) Steppin' Stone" (Monkees cover) – 03:34
6. "Killing Winds" – 06:49
7. "The Sentence Is Death" – 07:01
8. "Agents of the Dark (M.I.B.)" – 05:30
9. "Antipathy" – 00:28
10. "Mr. Death" – 4:08

== Personnel ==
Band lineup

- James Hamilton – vocals
- Arthur Vinett – guitars
- Greg Messick – guitars
- Todd Nelson – bass
- John Pieroni – drums, (lead vocals on "Steppin' Stone")

Production

- Tom Harding – recording and mixing
- Brad Jones – additional engineering
- Rich Larson, Steve Fastner – cover art
