= China (China album) =

Studio album by China
- Released: 1988
- Studios: Musicland, Munich, Germany
- Genre: Hard rock
- Label: Vertigo
- Producer: Dirk Steffens

China chronology
China (1988)	Sign in the Sky (1989)

Alternative cover

Singles from China
- 1. "Hot Lovin' Night" Released: 1988; 2. "Shout It Out" Released: 1988; 3. "Wild Jealousy" Released: 1988

Professional ratings
Review scores
Source	Rating
Hi-Fi News & Record Review	A:2

China is the debut studio album by hard rock band China, released in 1988, through record label Vertigo. The singles of this album were "Hot Lovin' Night", "Shout It Out" and "Wild Jealousy".

== Track listing ==
- All songs written by China, except "Back to You", By Fernando Von Arb, and "Intro" by Fabian Emmenegger.

No.	Title	Length
1.	"Intro"	0:59
2.	"Shout It Out"	4:11
3.	"Back to You"	3:42
4.	"The Fight Is On"	4:19
5.	"Wild Jealousy"	4:26
6.	"Rock City"	4:44
7.	"Hot Lovin' Night"	3:08
8.	"Living on the Stage"	4:11
9.	"I Need Your Love"	4:15
10.	"When Passion Burns"	4:32
11.	"Staying Alive"	3:22
12.	"One Shot to the Heart"	3:26
13.	"Don't Look Back"	3:29

- Note: The original release featured only the first 11 tracks. However, there are some versions which feature "One Shot to the Heart" (a bonus track) as number 11, thus moving "Staying Alive" down one slot in the listing. The same release also tacks on "Don't Look Back" as a bonus, thus allotting it two extra songs.

== Personnel ==
- Math Shiverow: Vocals
- Freddy Laurence: Rhythm and lead guitar
- Claudio Matteo: Rhythm and lead guitar
- Marc Lynn: Bass
- John Dommen: Drums, percussion

== Charts ==
Chart (1988)	Peak position
Swiss Albums (Schweizer Hitparade)	6
