= Dark Heresy =

English death metal band

- Origin: London, United Kingdom
- Genres: Death metal; progressive death metal
- Years active: 1990–1997
- Label: Unisound Records
- Members: Arnold; Kola Krauze; Hans Stiles; Wooj
- Past members: Loz Archer; Matt Goddard; Paul Harvey; Jae; Marcus Greatwood(Mortgage)

Dark Heresy was an English death metal band from south-west London, active during 1990–1997, a period during which the London underground metal scene peaked. They played over fifty concerts across England during this period, often as headliners (including one night headlining the Marquee Club) as well as supporting bands like Ancient Rites, Cradle of Filth and Dissection.

== Musical style ==
Dark Heresy is considered a progressive death metal band. Dark Heresy's 1993 demo Diabolus in Musica was praised for amalgamating "well-chosen sprinklings of classic Morbid Angel with a UK death [metal] flair", and for mixing thrash "with classy chunks of unapologetic metal."

Although dismissed by rock music magazine Kerrang! as "a widdly Carcass", their 1995 album Abstract Principles Taken to Their Logical Extremes was praised by extreme music magazine Terrorizer, who wrote that "Dark Heresy's music is not about mind-numbing brutality and dazzling speed, but is about complex and reflective musical structures supporting complex ideas ... while the vocals swing from gruff grunts to choral chants", and described Diabolus In Musica as "one of the most inventive works from an occultist band." Writing in Isten magazine in 1996, Endre Begby described Dark Heresy as "speak[ing] a tonal language very uncommon in death metal" and "break[ing] out of the fifth and major/minor third patterns." He similarly compared part of Abstract Principles Taken to Their Logical Extremes to Morbid Angel's 1989 debut album Altars of Madness, while noting that other parts are "totally flipped out, finding no comparison in modern metal", and summing up that Dark Heresy "fuck with the very foundation of death metal as we know it". Heavy metal and hard rock website Worshipmetal.com agreed with these assessments when revisiting Abstract Principles Taken to Their Logical Extremes in 2017, noting the complex compositions, and adding that Dark Heresy "seemed to throw every single idea into the mix, culminating in a bewildering experience that managed to be both beautiful and brutal in the same breath", and finding similarities between Dark Heresy's music and that of Carcass, Pestilence, and the Mahavishnu Orchestra, and describing their approach to songwriting as "difficult to pin down but ... utterly unique nonetheless."

== Lyrics ==
Written by vocalist Kola Krauze 1993–1995, Dark Heresy's lyrics were extremely long and dealt with themes such as Norse and Germanic mythology and paganism, historical themes such as the Middle Ages, and religion and anti-religion. Describing them as "many anti-Christian diatribes which are as clever as they are shocking or sardonic", Terrorizer magazine claimed that "After hearing [Abstract Principles Taken to Their Logical Extremes], you too may seriously question many aspects about the spiritual self".

== Legacy ==
A decade after Dark Heresy had split up, DragonForce's Herman Li said of them, "they're the ones everybody knows the name of. You know, loads of people have got a copy of [Abstract Principles Taken to Their Logical Extremes]. They must have beaten a lot of people up." Singer-songwriter Mat McNerney has similarly cited Dark Heresy as an early influence. In 2017, Abstract Principles Taken to Their Logical Extremes was named one of the 10 greatest old school UK death metal albums by heavy metal and hard rock website Worshipmetal.com, whose editor described the album as a "lasting legacy", and noted that Dark Heresy "were a complete anomaly in their ... genre".

== Band members ==
Current members

- Richard 'Arnold' Summers – guitar, keyboards (1990–1997)
- Kola Krauze – vocals (1993–1995)
- Hans Stiles – bass (1992–1997)
- Wooj – drums (1990–1997)

Former members

- Loz Archer – vocals (1990–1993)
- Matt Goddard – guitar (1990–1993)
- Paul Harvey – bass (1990–1992)
- Jae – guitar
- Mortgage – guitar (1993–1994)

== Discography ==
=== Album ===
- Abstract Principles Taken to Their Logical Extremes (Unisound Records, 1995)

=== Demos ===
- Diabolus In Musica (1993)
- Speared and Twisted (1992)
- The Excellent Demo (1991)
- Blinded by Lies (1990)
