= Abstract Principles Taken to Their Logical Extremes =

Studio album by Dark Heresy
- Released: 1995
- Recorded: 1995
- Studios: Element Studios, 26–28 December 1994 and 12–14 January 1995
- Genre: Death metal
- Length: 60:30
- Labels: Unisound, Svart
- Producers: Dark Heresy, Jody Sherry

Abstract Principles Taken to Their Logical Extremes is the only album by Dark Heresy, a death metal band from London, England, released in 1995 on the Greek label Unisound.

The album was remastered by Jaime Gomez Arellano and re-released by Svart Records on CD and Double Gatefold Vinyl. The re-release features updated artwork and a comprehensive booklet with flyers, lyrics and interviews.

== Reception ==
Although dismissed by rock music magazine Kerrang! as "a widdly Carcass", their 1995 album Abstract Principles Taken to Their Logical Extremes was praised by extreme music magazine Terrorizer, who wrote that "Dark Heresy's music is not about mind-numbing brutality and dazzling speed, but is about complex and reflective musical structures supporting complex ideas ... while the vocals swing from gruff grunts to choral chants", and described Diabolus In Musica as "one of the most inventive works from an occultist band." Writing in Isten magazine in 1996, Endre Begby described Dark Heresy as "speak[ing] a tonal language very uncommon in death metal" and "break[ing] out of the fifth and major/minor third patterns." He similarly compared part of Abstract Principles Taken to Their Logical Extremes to Morbid Angel's 1989 debut album Altars of Madness, while noting that other parts are "totally flipped out, finding no comparison in modern metal", and summing up that Dark Heresy "fuck with the very foundation of death metal as we know it". Heavy metal and hard rock website Worshipmetal.com agreed with these assessments when revisiting Abstract Principles Taken to Their Logical Extremes in 2017, noting the complex compositions, and adding that Dark Heresy "seemed to throw every single idea into the mix, culminating in a bewildering experience that managed to be both beautiful and brutal in the same breath", and finding similarities between Dark Heresy's music and that of Carcass, Pestilence, and the Mahavishnu Orchestra, and describing their approach to songwriting as "difficult to pin down but ... utterly unique nonetheless."

== Track listing ==
1. "Engines of Torture" – 4:00
2. "The Last Temptation of Pan" – 8:00
3. "The Ceremony" – 7:39
4. "Thy Blood" – 9:45
5. "Ofermod" – 7:05
6. "Hole" – 5:45
7. "The Millstone" – 7:54
8. "Tyler's Stand" – 10:22

== Personnel ==
Current lineup/members of Dark Heresy

Hans Stiles	Bass
Wooj	Drums
Arnold	Guitars, Keyboards
Rob	Vocals

Former members of Dark Heresy

Paul Harvey	Bass
Matt Goddard	Guitars
Mortgage	Guitars
Jae	Guitars
Kola Krauze	Vocals
Loz Archer	Vocals
