= Kick 'Em When They're Down =

Studio album by Znowhite
- Released: 1985
- Recorded: June 1983, May 1984
- Studio: Music America Studios, Pierce Arrow Recorders
- Genre: Speed metal
- Length: 16:54
- Label: Enigma
- Producer: Paul Curcio (tracks 1 and 4), Ian Tafoya (track 2, 3 and 5)

Znowhite chronology
All Hail to Thee (1984)	Kick 'Em When They're Down (1985)	Act of God (1988)

Kick 'Em When They're Down is a studio album by the band Znowhite.

== Track listing ==
- All songs written by Ian Tafoya
1. "Live For the Weekend" (1:28)
2. "All Hail to Thee" (3:12)
3. "Run Like the Wind" (4:25)
4. "Too Late" (2:16)
5. "Turn Up the Pain" (5:25)

== Personnel ==
- Ian Tafoya - Guitars, Bass
- Sparks Tafoya - Drums
- Nicole Lee - Vocals
