= Escape from Pain =

EP by Intruder
- Released: August 1990
- Recorded: February 24–26 at The Garage in Nashville, Tennessee
- Genre: Speed metal, Thrash metal
- Length: 29:25
- Label: Caroline, Lost and Found Records, Metal Blade
- Producer: Tom Harding

Escape from Pain is an EP by the thrash metal band Intruder. It was originally released on Metal Blade and Caroline in 1990 re issued in December, 2006 by Lost and Found Records limited to 500 copies.

Escape from Pain was admittedly released as an excuse to tour. It features three re-recorded songs from previous albums, a cover of "25 or 6 to 4" by Chicago, and just one new song (the title track). It is also the only one of their Metal Blade releases not to be issued on all three formats of CD, cassette and vinyl.

== Track listing ==
No.	Title	Length
1.	"25 or 6 to 4" (Chicago cover)	7:14
2.	"Escape from Pain"	8:55
3.	"Cold-Blooded Killer"	5:26
4.	"Kiss of Death"	5:42
5.	"T.M. (You Paid the Price)"	4:20
Total length:		29:25

== Personnel ==
- Jimmy Hamilton - vocals
- Arthur Vinett - guitar
- Greg Messick - guitar
- Todd Nelson - bass
- John Pieroni - drums

Production

- Tom Harding - recording and mixing
- Rich Larson, Steve Fastner - cover art
