= All Hail to Thee =

Studio album by Znowhite
- Released: 1984
- Recorded: July 1983
- Studio: Music America Studios, Soto Sound Studios
- Genre: Speed metal
- Length: 16:59
- Label: Enigma Records
- Producer: Paul Curcio

Znowhite chronology
All Hail to Thee (1984)	Kick 'Em When They're Down (1985)

All Hail to Thee is a studio album by American band Znowhite.

== Track listing ==
1. Sledgehammer
2. Saturday Night
3. Somethin' for Nothin'
4. Bringin' the Hammer Down
5. Do or Die
6. Never Felt Like This
7. Rock City Destination

== Personnel ==
- Ian Tafoya - Guitars, Bass
- Sparks Tafoya - Drums
- Nicole Lee - Vocals
