= Act of God (album) =

Studio album by Znowhite
- Released: 1988
- Genre: Thrash metal, speed metal
- Length: 48:57
- Label: Roadracer
- Producer: Ian Tafoya and Scott Schafer

Znowhite chronology
Kick 'Em When They're Down (1985)	Act of God (1988)

Professional ratings
Review scores
Source	Rating
Sea Of Tranquily	3/5 stars

Act of God is a studio album by the American Thrash/speed metal band Znowhite. Metal Hammer included the album cover on their list of "50 most hilariously ugly rock and metal album covers ever".

== Track listing ==
All songs by Ian Tafoya

1. "To the Last Breath" - 5:38
2. "Baptized by Fire" - 3:58
3. "Pure Blood" - 4:52
4. War Machine - 5:26
5. "Thunderdome" - 4:34
6. "Rest in Peace" - 6:03
7. "Diseased Bigotry" - 4:48
8. "A Soldier's Creed" - 4:12
9. "Something Wicked (This Way Comes)" - 9:26

== Personnel ==
- Nicole Lee - Vocals
- Ian Tafoya - Guitars
- Scott Schafer - Bass and Drums
