= The Way to Go =

Studio album by Equinox
- Released: 1990
- Genre: Thrash metal
- Length: 37:37
- Label: BMG

Equinox chronology
Auf Wiedersehen (1989)	The Way to Go (1990)	Xerox Success (1992)

The Way to Go is the second full-length album, released by thrash metal band Equinox. It was released in 1990.

Contrary to their debut Auf Wiedersehen, Equinox were now signed to BMG by local representative Eivind Rølles already during the production phase of the album. Equinox worked on a bigger budget, allowing them to spend 17 days in the studio to record the album.

The Way to Go was preceded by a single off the album, "Skrell", which was released as a maxi single called Skrell with two non-album tracks: cover versions of the punk songs "Loven slår" by Hærverk and "Too Drunk to Fuck" by Dead Kennedys. The song "Skrell" was also a novelty in Equinox' production, being an instrumental track and featuring unusual instruments. The band looked for a musician to add violin; being ultimately turned down by Annbjørg Lien, they recruited former folk rock player Trond Villa. Furthermore, Grim Stene attempted to play accordion on thee album.

The release concert for The Way to Go was at Rockefeller Music Hall in Oslo; however, due to a delay in the pressing, the album was not ready. Thus it became a normal concert, with the album arriving in stores the next week. The album was next released in Finland, followed by Germany. Equinox also played in England, supporting Slammer at the Marquee Club.

== Reception ==
The album received a 5 out of 6 score in Beat.

The album received a 4 out of 6 score in Bergens Arbeiderblad; it had significant replay value, but not all tracks held equally high quality.

== Track listing ==
Studio Album
No.	Title	Length
1.	"Fine by Me"	4:14
2.	"Inner Self"	6:25
3.	"Skrell"	5:12
4.	"Godamadog"	3:23
5.	"Quest for Fire"	2:57
6.	"Conveyer of Truth"	4:09
7.	"Flower Power"	4:47
8.	"What It Is Worth"	6:12
