= Znowhite =

American thrash/speed metal band

Znöwhite

Background information
- Also known as: Snowhite, ZnöWhite
- Origin: Chicago, Illinois, U.S.
- Genres: Thrash metal, speed metal
- Years active: 1982–1989
- Labels: Enigma, Roadrunner, Metal Mind
- Spinoffs: Cyclone Temple
- Past members: Ian Tafoya; Sparks Tafoya; Nicole Lee; Nicky Tafoya; Alex Olvera; Scott Schafer; Debbie Gunn; John Slattery
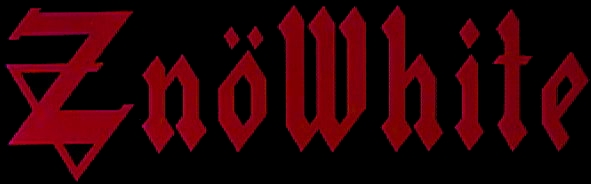

Znowhite (or Znöwhite) was an American thrash/speed metal band credited for pioneering thrash metal in Chicago.

== History ==
=== Formation ===
In 1982, Znowhite was founded by two African American brothers, guitarist Ian Tafoya and drummer Sparks Tafoya (real names Greg Fulton and Tony Heath), along with cousin Nicky Tafoya (real name Curtis Fulton) on bass. Nicole Lee (real name Sue Sharp) joined the group soon after as lead vocalist. The band performed as Snowhite, but replaced the S with a Z. They self-released a three-song flexi disc that featured the song "Hellbent". This caught the attention of Metal Blade Records founder Brian Slagel. Znowhite was featured on volume three of the Metal Massacre compilation, which gave them some exposure.

=== Lineup changes and disbandment ===
After Znowhite's initial success, Lee, Ian, and Sparks replaced bassist Amp Dawg with Scott Schafer in 1985. They toured the US and Canada for four years, and self-released the live album Live Suicide. Back in Chicago, the band started work on the last Znowhite release, Act of God. Toward the end of recording, Lee left Znowhite. Act of God was released in 1988 through Roadrunner Records. An extensive American tour followed the album's release and featured Sentinel Beast vocalist Debbie Gunn (real name Debbie Gunderson) and drummer John Slattery - formerly of the band Tools Of Ignorance. Gunn left after the tours, while Fulton, Schafer, and Slattery went on to form Cyclone Temple. When Cyclone Temple disbanded Fulton, Schafer, and Fulton's brother, former Znowhite drummer Tony Heath, formed a new group named Rebels Without Applause. Gunn went on to sing for the group Ice Age and, later, to reform Sentinel Beast.

== Band members ==
Last known lineup

- Greg Fulton (aka "Ian Tafoya") – guitars (1982–1989)
- Scott Schafer – bass (1985–1989), drums (1987–1988)
- John Slattery – drums (1988–1989)
- Brian Troch – vocals (1989)

Former members

- Curtis Fulton (aka "Nicky Tafoya") – bass (1982–1983)
- Tony Heath (aka "Sparks Tafoya") – drums (1982–1986)
- Sue Sharp (aka "Nicole Lee") – vocals (1982–1988)
- Amp Dawg – bass (1984)
- Alex Olvera – bass (1987)
- Debbie Gunderson (aka "Debbie Gunn") – vocals (1988–1989)

== Discography ==
=== Studio albums ===
- All Hail to Thee (EP, 1984)
- Kick 'Em When They're Down (EP, 1985)
- Act of God (1988)

=== Live albums ===
- Live Suicide (EP, 1986)

=== Compilation albums ===
- ZnöWhite (1998)
- ZnöWhite (2007 re-issue with albums All Hail to Thee + Kick 'Em When They're Down + Live Suicide)

=== Singles ===
- Live for the Weekend (1983)

=== Other appearances ===
- "Hell Bent" on Metal Massacre III (1983)
- "Baptized by Fire" on Stars on Thrash (1988)

== Sources ==
- Christe, Ian (2003). Sound of the Beast: The Complete Headbanging History of Heavy Metal. HarperCollins. ISBN 0-380-81127-8
