= Dead Horse (band) =

American thrash metal band

- Origin: Houston, Texas, U.S.
- Genres: Thrash metal; crossover thrash; death metal
- Years active: 1987–1997; 2011–2019; 2025–present
- Labels: Death Ride; Big Chief; Beermoment; Independent
- Spinoffs: Pasadena Napalm Division
- Members: Allen Price; Scott Sevall; Michael Argo; Chris Forshage; Jason Allen
- Past members: Rob Moore; Michael Haaga; Ronnie Guyote; Greg Martin
- Website: horsecore.net

Dead Horse is an American thrash metal band from Houston, Texas, initially active from 1987 to 1997. They reunited from 2011 to 2019 and announced their second reunion in 2025. The music of Dead Horse been described as death metal and crossover thrash. They incorporated elements of country music and Texas culture that can be heard on songs such as "Hank" from Horsecore and "Chiggers" from Feed Me.

== History ==
=== Initial career (1987–1997) ===
The band's first release, Horsecore: An Unrelated Story That's Time Consuming, was released independently in 1989. A nationally distributed LP, Peaceful Death and Pretty Flowers, was released in 1991 through independent record label Big Chief and distributed by Metal Blade under its parent Warner Bros. Records. Dead Horse released the self-financed EP Feed Me in 1993, which was intended as a demo for Interscope Records but failed to garner major label interest. About that time, lead vocalist/guitarist Michael Haaga left the group to pursue other interests. Dead Horse replaced Haaga with Austin musician Scott Sevall (ex-Force Fed) and rerecorded a new demo, BOIL, receiving a positive review in Metal Maniacs in later 1995. Later in 1996, Dead Horse recorded the EP BOIL(ing) with Tim Gerron and released it on Beermoment Music through Sound Virus Records.

=== Post-breakup (1998–2010) ===
Haaga went on to form The Demonseeds with drummer Joseph Fazzio and bassist Craig Cazaubon and released the album Knee Deep in Hell's Grasp in 1999. The Houston Press nominated the band in 2000 for "Best Metal/Hard Rock." They didn't win the "Readers Choice" category but won the "Critics Choice".

Haaga is credited on the first release from Superjoint Ritual, Use Once and Destroy, as the band's bassist and backing vocalist but his credit is buried 14 lines below the other band members, below the disc's "Photography" credit. He released a solo LP with the backing of several musicians from the Houston and Austin area entitled The Plus and Minus Show. It was released in late 2004 and won four Houston Press Music Awards in 2005; five awards in total, including Best Guitar for Kelly Doyle, who, in addition to playing in The Plus and Minus Show, played in Houston Bands Three Fantastic and Clouseaux. Haaga's first solo effort won Album of the Year, Songwriter of the Year, Song of the Year and Local Artist of the Year. The band broke up shortly after.

Ronnie Guyote also played drums in Houston based metal band nOthing which began towards the end of his tenure with Dead Horse but ended abruptly towards the end of 2005 when their vocalist/guitar player's drug addiction began to compromise the band's professionalism and integrity. It was about this time that Ronnie and nOthing bassist Mike Lucas joined up with Mike BBQ to reform Houston Industrial band Death Kultur BBQ but have only played a handful of shows since 2005 but most recently in 2014.

In 1999, Relapse Records re-released Horsecore and Peaceful Death and Pretty Flowers; all of the tracks from Death Rides a Dead Horse were bonus tracks for Horsecore while Peaceful Death and Pretty Flowers was accompanied with a track from Feed Me and tracks from their 1990 demo. Additionally, there were hidden tracks on both of the reissued CD's. On Horsecore, the hidden track was the slowed down version of French Fry immediately followed by the real-time version of French Fry. French Fry appeared on the original CD issue as track eight while apparently not on the original vinyl. On Peaceful Death and Pretty Flowers, the unnamed bonus hidden track was a collection of slowed down, spoken voices from the song Peaceful Death.

Greg, Scott, and Ronnie have since gone on to form the band Pasadena Napalm Division with D.R.I. vocalist Kurt Brecht along with nOthing bassist Mike Lucas. Shortly after, Lucas left the band and the bassist role was filled by George D. In 2013, original Dead Horse bassist Allen Price joined PND and they have moved forward with releasing their 2013 full-length LP entitled Pasadena Napalm Division on Minus Head Records.

=== Reunions (2011–present) ===
In 2011 the Boil(ing) era members of dead horse reunited with the addition of Mike Argo on vocals and re-released their last album BOIL(ing). The band subsequently played reunion shows in Houston at the Warehouse Live, in Austin at FunFunFunFest, and also in Fort Worth at The Rail Club on December 2 and 3, 2011. In November 2012, Dead Horse released the DVD Making a Dead Horse LIVE, which contains live footage of the new line-up and played coinciding DVD release shows in Austin, San Antonio, Dallas and Houston.

On July 4, 2014, Dead Horse released a new CD titled Loaded Gun featuring four new songs and 10 live tracks from the Making a Dead Horse LIVE! DVD with the band's current lineup. Dead Horse had been actively writing and playing shows in the southern US in between stints playing as Pasadena Napalm Division with D.R.I. vocalist Kurt Brecht.

Dead Horse released their first studio album in 26 years, The Beast That Comes, on September 15, 2017.

In 2019, Dead Horse once again called it quits. In September 2025, the band announced their second reunion, with plans to play shows, and guitarist Chris Forshage and drummer Jason Allen replacing Greg Martin and Ronny Guyote respectively.

== Members ==
=== Current members ===
- Allen "Alpo" Price – bass, backing vocals
- Scott Sevall – guitar, vocals
- Michael Argo – vocals
- Chris Forshage – guitar
- Jason Allen – drums

=== Former members ===
- Michael Haaga – guitar, vocals (1987–1994)
- Greg Martin – guitar, vocals
- Ronnie Guyote – drums, backing vocals

== Discography ==
- Death Rides a Dead Horse (demo, 1988)
- Horsecore: An Unrelated Story That's Time Consuming (recorded in 1989, self-financed). Compact Disc: (c) Demo 90 (p) 1992 Dead Horse DIDX 015987 (Reissue, 1999 Relapse)
- Peaceful Death and Pretty Flowers (1991, Big Chief/Metal Blade/Warner Bros.) (Reissue, 1999 Relapse)
- Feed Me EP (1994, Horsecore Publishing, DHO-3, self-financed)
- BOIL (ing) (1996, Sound Virus / Beermoment Music, DH-4)
- BOIL (ing) (2011, Abbyss Records)
- Loaded Gun (released July 4, 2014, self-financed) CD
- The Beast That Comes (released September 15, 2017, self-financed) CD

== Filmography ==
- When We Ruled H-town – The story of the 90's Houston Music scene
- Making A Dead Horse Live! (released in November 2012, self-financed) DVD
