= Xerox Success =

Studio album by Equinox
- Released: 1992
- Genre: Thrash metal
- Length: 40:19
- Label: BMG

Equinox chronology
The Way to Go (1990)	Xerox Success (1992)	Labyrinth (1994)

Xerox Success is the third full-length album by thrash metal band Equinox, released in 1992. It was the last album with Ragnar Westin playing the drums, as he left after its recording.

== Reception ==
Reviews in the mainstream press included several dice throws of 5 (out of 6). These included Nordlands Framtid and a newspaper from the band's hometown, Fredriksstad Blad. Bergensavisen was also moderately positive, issuing a dice throw of 4.

There were more mediocre reviews, with mainstream music critics scoring the album 3 out of 6. Some called for more melodies in Equinox' music, and complained that the music was "choppy". Oppland Arbeiderblad were negative: "thunderous, anti-melodic heavy rock, interspersed with some sci-fi sounds and the odd break with an acoustic guitar".

== Track listing ==
Studio Album
No.	Title	Length
1.	"Xerox Success"	3:40
2.	"Souls at Zero"	4:40
3.	"Lost Control"	4:15
4.	"Jabbermouth"	2:11
5.	"My Sweet TV"	5:19
6.	"Now!"	3:13
7.	"Slave to the Whim"	3:42
8.	"Nothing at All"	4:06
9.	"Damned"	2:56
10.	"Succumb to the Law"	6:06

== Personnel ==
- Grim Stene – guitars, lead vocals
- Tommy Skarning – guitars
- Skule Stene – bass
- Ragnar Westin – drums
