= Peaceful Death and Pretty Flowers =

Studio album by Dead Horse
- Released: 1991
- Recorded: 1991
- Genre: Crossover thrash, thrash metal, death metal
- Length: 42:11
- Label: Big Chief Records, Metal Blade Records

Dead Horse chronology
Horsecore: An Unrelated Story That's Time Consuming (1989)	Peaceful Death and Pretty Flowers (1991)	Feed Me (1994)

Peaceful Death and Pretty Flowers is the second album by the Houston, Texas based death/thrash metal band Dead Horse. It was released in 1991 on the independent label Big Chief Records, and again eight years later on Relapse Records, with four bonus tracks. Peaceful Death and Pretty Flowers was Dead Horse's last studio album for 26 years (until 2017's The Beast That Comes), although the band had released three EPs of new material in the interim.

== Reception ==
Professional ratings
Review scores
Source	Rating
AllMusic	3/5 stars

Alex Henderson of AllMusic states that Peaceful Death and Pretty Flowers is "worth searching for if you're a headbanger."

== Track listing ==
All tracks are written by Dead Horse, except where noted.

No.	Title	Writer(s)	Length
1.	"Cod Piece Face"		3:29
2.	"Turn"		2:58
3.	"La La Song"		2:05
4.	"Like Asrielle"		3:53
5.	"The Latent Stage"		3:35
6.	"Peaceful Death"		4:55
7.	"Eulogy"		2:42
8.	"Snowdogs"		4:00
9.	"The Lark Nest"		4:48
10.	"Medulla Oblongata"		3:08
11.	"Aplo"		2:09
12.	"Rock Lobster" (The B-52's cover)	Fred Schneider, Ricky Wilson	3:36
13.	"Sawbone"		0:53
Total length:			42:11

All tracks are written by Dead Horse, except where noted.

1999 reissue
No.	Title	Writer(s)	Length
1.	"Cod Piece Face"		3:29
2.	"Turn"		2:58
3.	"La La Song"		2:05
4.	"Like Asrielle"		3:53
5.	"The Latent Stage"		3:35
6.	"Peaceful Death"		4:55
7.	"Eulogy"		2:42
8.	"Snowdogs"		4:00
9.	"The Lark Nest"		4:48
10.	"Medulla Oblongata"		3:08
11.	"Aplo"		2:09
12.	"Rock Lobster" (The B-52's cover)	Fred Schneider, Ricky Wilson	3:36
13.	"Sawbone"		0:53
14.	"Every God For Himself" (tracks 14–17 are bonus tracks)		4:49
15.	"Turn"		3:05
16.	"Medulla Oblongata"		1:13
17.	"Waiting For the Sun/Voices"		11:11
Total length:			62:29

== Personnel ==
- Michael Haaga – vocals, guitars
- Greg Martin – guitars, backing vocals
- Allen (Alpo) Price – bass, backing vocals
- Ronnie Guyote – drums, backing vocals
