= Psycho Savant =

Studio album by Intruder
- Released: June 1991
- Genre: Thrash metal
- Length: 54:13
- Label: Metal Blade
- Producer: Bill Metoyer

Intruder chronology
| A Higher Form of Killing (1989) | Psycho Savant (1991) |

Professional ratings
Review scores
| Source | Rating |
|---|---|
| Allmusic | 4.5/5 stars |

Psycho Savant is the third and final studio album by the metal band Intruder. It was released in June, 1991, on Metal Blade and Warner Bros. Records. The album moved toward slower tempos and longer songs (all but one of the songs are over 6 minutes in length). It was also their only album Tom Harding did not produce.

"N.G.R.I." stands for "Not Guilty for Reason of Insanity."

In the song "Geri's Lament (When)", the word 'Geri's' is short for 'geriatrics'. The song deals with the abuse of the elderly at senior care living facilities. The song was lauded for spreading awareness on a then relatively unknown problem.

== Track listing ==
1. "Face of Hate" - 06:12
2. "Geri's Lament (When)" - 07:33
3. "The Enemy Within" - 06:57
4. "It's a Good Life" - 07:39
5. "Invisible" - 06:46
6. "Traitor to the Living" - 07:51
7. "Final Word" - 04:31
8. "N.G.R.I." - 06:44

== Personnel ==
- Jimmy Hamilton - vocals
- Arthur Vinett - guitar
- Greg Messick - guitar
- Todd Nelson - bass
- John Pieroni - drums

Production

- Bill Metoyer - recording and mixing
- Rich Larson, Steve Fastner - cover art
