= Live to Die (Intruder album) =

Studio album by Intruder
- Released: 1987
- Genre: Speed metal, thrash metal
- Length: 41:57
- Label: Ironworks, Hellion Records
- Producer: Tom Harding

Intruder chronology
Live to Die (1987)	A Higher Form of Killing (1989)

Professional ratings
Review scores
Source	Rating
Metal Crypt	4.5/5 stars

Live to Die is the debut album by the speed metal band Intruder. It was originally released in 1987 and re-released in 2004 on vinyl and CD (which includes bonus tracks from the 1986 and 1984 demos recorded under the name "Transgresser").

== Track listing ==
1. "Cover Up" - 4:00
2. "Turn Back" - 4:43
3. "Victory in Disguise" - 5:35
4. "Live to Die" - 6:35
5. "Kiss of Death" - 5:41
6. "Cold-Blooded Killer" - 5:29
7. "Blind Rage" - 5:17
8. "T.M. (You Paid the Price)" - 4:37

== Re-release bonus tracks ==
9. "Cold-Blooded Killer" (Transgresser demo 86) - 5:17
10. "Blind Rage" (Transgresser demo 86) - 5:23
11. "Victory In" Disguise (Transgresser demo 86) - 4:56
12. "Cover Up" (Transgresser demo 84) - 3:53
13. "Night Shift" (Transgresser demo 84) - 4:22
14. "Live to Die" (Transgresser demo 84) - 6:36

== Personnel ==
- James Hamilton – vocals
- Arthur Vinett – guitar
- Todd Nelson – bass
- John Pieroni – drums
