= Child's Play (band) =

American rock band

- Promotional poster for their album Rat Race; L to R: Idzi, John Allen, Nicky Kay, and Brian Jack

Background information
- Origin: Baltimore, Maryland, U.S.
- Genres: Hard rock, heavy metal, hair metal
- Years active: 1983–1995 (reunions: 2003–2005, 2011–2012, 2013, 2015, 2023-present)
- Label: Chrysalis Records
- Members: Larry "L.H." Hinshaw; Phil "Hitz" Wiser; John Allen; Nicky Kay; Jason Heiser
- Past members: Brian Jack; Jimmy Schaefer; Steve Albinak; Nicky Kay; Idzi; Tommy McRae; Ty Crook; Bobby Wilson

Child's Play (stylized as Child'ƨ Play) was an American rock band from Baltimore, Maryland. The group was formed in 1983 with Larry Hinshaw on vocals, Brian Jack on guitar, Phil Wiser on bass, Jimmy Schaefer on guitar, and Chad Channing (later Steve Albinak) on drums. The group later replaced Steve Albinak with John Allen on drums and added Nicky Kay as another guitar player, with this lineup recording their first EP, Ruff House, in 1986.

The band's lineup changed in 1987, with the addition of Idzi on bass and Brian Jack now performing vocals. They signed to Chrysalis Records in 1989. Their major label debut album, Rat Race, produced by Howard Benson, was released the following year on June 26. In 1990/91 they toured the United States, Co-Headlining with Cold Sweat.

On April 17, 2012, Brian Jack died. A memorial page on Facebook was started to honor him.

== Band members ==
Current Members

- Larry "L.H." Hinshaw – lead vocals (1983–1988, 2013, 2015, 2022, 2023-present)
- Phil "Hitz" Wiser – bass guitar, backing vocals (1983–1987, 2023-present); rhythm guitar, backing vocals (2022, 2023),
- John Allen – drums, backing and lead vocals (1984–1995, 2003–2005, 2011–2012, 2013, 2015, 2022, 2023-present)
- Nicky Kay – lead and rhythm guitar, backing vocals (1984–1995, 2003–2005, 2011–2012, 2013, 2015, 2022, 2023-present)
- Jason Heiser - drums, backing vocals (2022, 2023-present)

Former Members

- Brian Jack – lead and rhythm guitar, backing vocals (1983–1988); lead vocals, lead and rhythm guitar (1988–1991, 1994, 2003–2005, 2011–2012)
- Jimmy Schaefer – lead and rhythm guitar (1983–1984)
- Steve Albinak – drums (1983–1984)
- Idzi – bass guitar, backing vocals (1987–1995, 2003–2005, 2011–2012, 2013, 2015, 2022, 2023)
- Ty Crook - lead vocals, rhythm guitar (1991–1992)
- Tommy McRae – lead vocals, rhythm guitar (1993–1995)
- Bobby Wilson ~ drums (1991)

Timeline

== Discography ==
=== Extended plays ===
- Ruff House (1986)

=== Studio albums ===
- Rat Race (1990)
- Long Way (1993)

== See also ==
- List of glam metal bands and artists
