= Visceral Evisceration =

Austrian extreme metal band

Background information
- Also known as: As I Lay Dying
- Origin: Vienna, Austria
- Genres: Death-doom; gothic metal
- Years active: 1991–1995
- Label: Napalm Records
- Members: Hannes Wuggenig; Jürgen Hajek; Dominik Lirsch; Stephan Sternad

Visceral Evisceration was an Austrian melodic death-doom band from Vienna, formed in 1991. They were one of the first extreme metal bands to include female operatic vocals, contrasted by male grunts and clear vocals. Their songs were generally long and epic, combining slow doom riffs with mid-paced death metal, with gory and/or obscene sexual lyrics. After a demo, they released their sole album, Incessant Desire for Palatable Flesh, on Napalm Records. After the release of the album, they left Napalm and changed their name to As I Lay Dying (not to be confused with the US namesake), releasing a promo in 1995 before breaking up.

== Members ==
- Hannes Wuggenig – guitar, vocals
- Jürgen Hajek – guitar
- Dominik Lirsch – bass
- Stephan Sternad – drums

== Discography ==
- Savour of the Seething Meat (demo, 1993)
- Incessant Desire for Palatable Flesh (album, Napalm, 1994)
- Promo 1995 (demo, 1995) (as As I Lay Dying)
