= Sign in the Sky =

Studio album by China
- Released: 1989
- Studios: Atlantic Studios, Kampo Studios, Platinum Island Studios
- Genres: Hard rock, glam metal
- Length: 51:37
- Label: Vertigo
- Producers: Stephan Galfas, James Palace

China chronology
China (1988)	Sign in the Sky (1989)	Live (1991)

Singles from Sign in the Sky
- 1. "Sign in the Sky" Released: 1990; 2. "In the Middle of the Night" Released: 1990

Sign in the Sky is the second album by hard rock band China. It was released in 1989 by the label Vertigo. The single, "In the Middle of the Night", peaked at No. 11 on the Swiss Hitparade.

== Track listing ==
- All songs written by China and Stephen Galfas, except tracks 1 (Claudio C. Cueni). Copyright PolyGram Songs/Copyright Control.

No.	Title	Length
1.	"The Great Wall"	1:35
2.	"Dead Lights"	4:42
3.	"Animal Victim"	4:02
4.	"In the Middle of the Night"	4:23
5.	"Won't Give It Up"	4:30
6.	"Sign in the Sky"	5:46
7.	"Don't Ever Say Goodbye"	3:49
8.	"Broken Dream"	0:48
9.	"Second Chance"	4:52
10.	"Bitter Cold"	4:09
11.	"Take Your Time"	3:54
12.	"Harder Than Hell"	4:03
13.	"So Long"	5:05

== Charts ==
Chart (1989)	Peak position
German Albums (Offizielle Top 100)	45
Swiss Albums (Schweizer Hitparade)	2

== Certifications ==
Region	Certification	Certified units/sales
Switzerland (IFPI Switzerland)	Gold	25,000^{^}
^{^} Shipments figures based on certification alone.
