= Golem (band) =

German extreme death metal band

Golem is a German extreme death metal band. They took part in the 2007 Chronical Moshers Open Air festival. They should not be confused with a 1970s progressive rock band from Germany with the same name.

== History ==
The band was formed in 1989, in Buckow in Brandenburg (then still in East Germany). Two of the members died in automobile accidents, in 1992 Max Grützmacher and in 1993 Jens Malwitz. The band was re-formed and received for their debut album a contract with the East German label Invasion Records. After that label stopped producing records, they were without a contract again, but they were able to get another contract through the German label Nuclear Blast.

== Members ==
=== Current lineup ===
- Andreas Hilbert - Guitar, Vocals
- Rainer Humeniuk - Bass
- Erik Krebs - Drums
- Carsten May - Guitar

=== Past members ===
- Max Grützmacher - Bass (died 1992)
- Jens Malwitz - Guitar (died 1993)
- Michael Marschalk - Drums
- Rico Spiller - Bass
- Ruben Wittchow - Drums

== Discography ==
- Visceral Scab Demo, 1991
- Visceral Scab Single, 1992
- Recall the Day of Incarnation Demo, 1993
- Eternity: The Weeping Horizons Full-length, 1996
- The 2nd Moon Full-length, 1998
- Dreamweaver Full-length, 2004
