= Obscenity (band) =

German death metal band

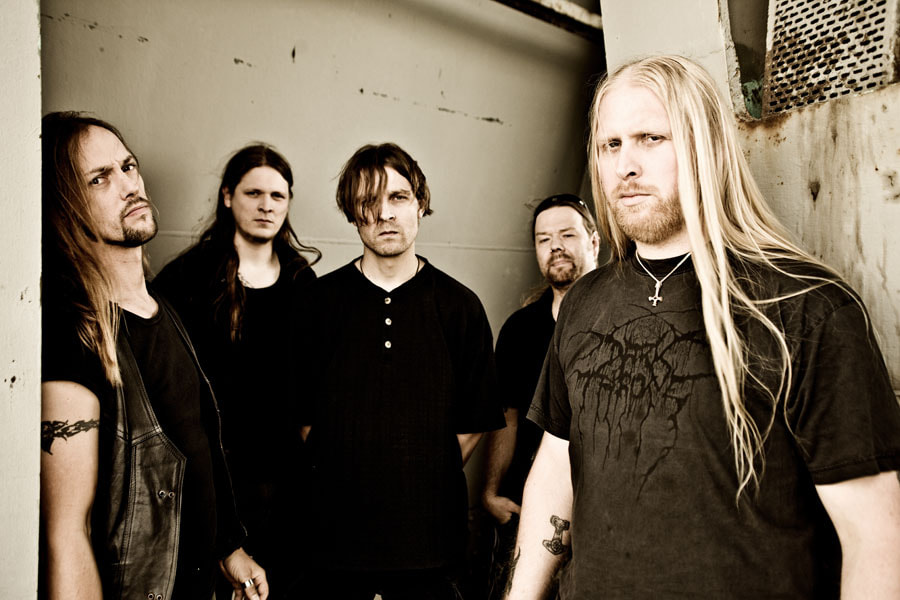
- Obscenity in 2012

Background information
- Origin: Oldenburg, Lower Saxony, Germany
- Genres: Death metal
- Years active: 1989–present
- Labels: Apostasy, Kolony, Armageddon, Morbid, D&S, West Virginia
- Members: Sascha Knust; Hendrick Bruns; Christoph Weerts; David Speckmann; Manuel Siewert
- Past members: Dirk Vogt; Oliver Jauch; Thimo Gerhardt; Jens Finger; Jens Claussen; Alexander Pahl; Marc-Andree Dieken; Gregor Frischko; Jeff Rudes; Jorg Pirch; Tobias Mueller

Obscenity is a German death metal band from Oldenburg that formed in 1989. The band has released ten studio albums, their most recent being Summoning the Circle, which was released in 2018.

== Members ==
=== Current members ===
- Sascha Knust- drums (1989–2000, 2011–present)
- Hendrick Bruns- guitar (1989–present)
- Christoph Weerts- guitar (2011–present)
- David Speckmann- bass (2016–present)
- Manuel Siewert- vocals (2016–present)

=== Past members ===
- Dirk Vogt- guitar (1989–1993)
- Oliver Jauch- vocals (1989–2009)
- Thimo Gerhardt- bass (1993–1997)
- Jens Finger- guitar (1994–2010)
- Jens Claussen- bass (1997–1998)
- Alexander Pahl- bass (1999–2006)
- Marc-Andree Dieken- drums (2000–2009)
- Gregor Frischko- bass (2007–2011)
- Jeff Rudes- vocals (2010–2013)
- Jorg Pirch- bass (2011–?)
- Tobias Mueller- vocals (2013–?)

== Discography ==
- Suffocated Truth (1992, West Virginia)
- Perversion Mankind (1994, D&S)
- The 3rd Chapter (1996, Morbid)
- Human Barbecue (1998, Morbid)
- Intense (2000, Morbid)
- Cold Blooded Murder (2002, Morbid)
- Where Sinners Bleed (2006, Armageddon)
- Atrophied in Anguish (2012, Apostasy)
- Retaliation (2016, Kolony)
- Summoning the Circle (2018, Apostasy)
