= Equinox (thrash metal band) =

Norwegian thrash metal band

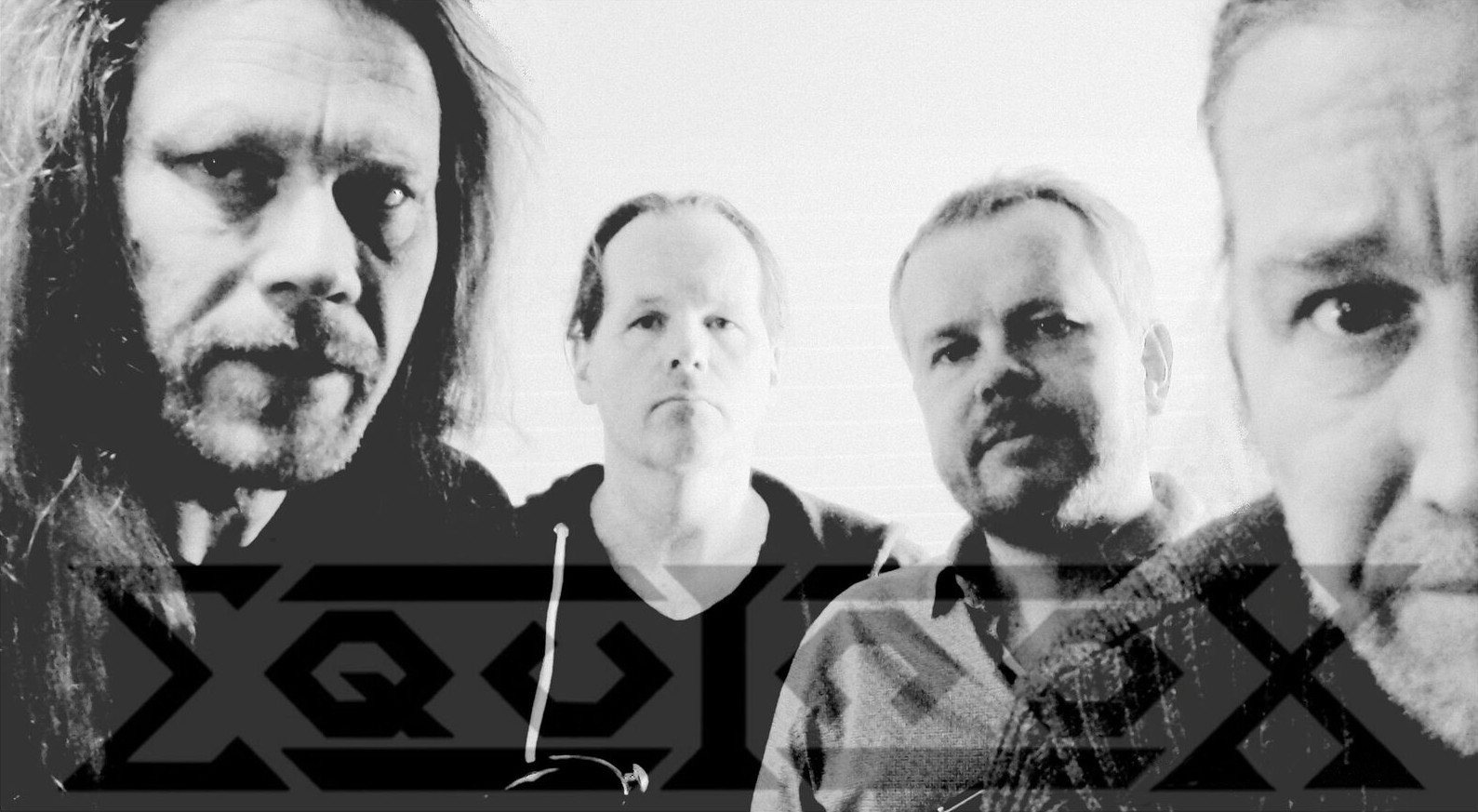

Background information
- Origin: Fredrikstad, Norway
- Genres: Thrash metal
- Years active: 1987–1995
- Labels: Laughing Deer Productions; BMG
- Members: Grim Stene; Skule Stene; Ragnar Westin; Øystein Warem
- Past members: Tommy Skarning; Espen Holm; Jørn Wangsholm

Equinox is a Norwegian thrash metal band from Fredrikstad that started in 1987. The initial band members were Grim Stene (guitar/vocals), Ragnar 'Raggen' Westin (drums) and Skule Stene (bass guitar) who were all ex-Rebellion members. In 1988 Tommy Skarning joined as a second guitarist. On the album Labyrinth Tommy was no longer with the band, and Raggen was exchanged with Jørn Wangsholm. The band broke up in 1995.

On 15 November 2017 Equinox announced that they were doing an exclusive comeback concert at the Tons of Rock Festival in Halden with the original band members.

== Discography ==
- What the Fuck Is This 1988 Laughing Deer
- Auf Wiedersehen 1989 Laughing Deer/BMG
- Skrell maxi single 1990 BMG
- The Way to Go 1990 BMG
- NUH! EP 1991 BMG
- Xerox Success 1992 BMG
- Labyrinth 1995 Progress Records

=== Members ===
- Grim Stene – guitars, lead vocals (1987-1995, 2017-2019)
- Tommy Skarning – guitars (1987-1992)
- Espen Holm – guitars (1992-1995)
- Øystein Warem – guitars (2018-2019)
- Skule Stene – bass (1987-1995, 2017-2019)
- Ragnar Westin – drums (1987-1992, 2017-2019)
- Jørn Wangsholm – drums (1992-1995)
