= Jutta Weinhold =

German rock singer

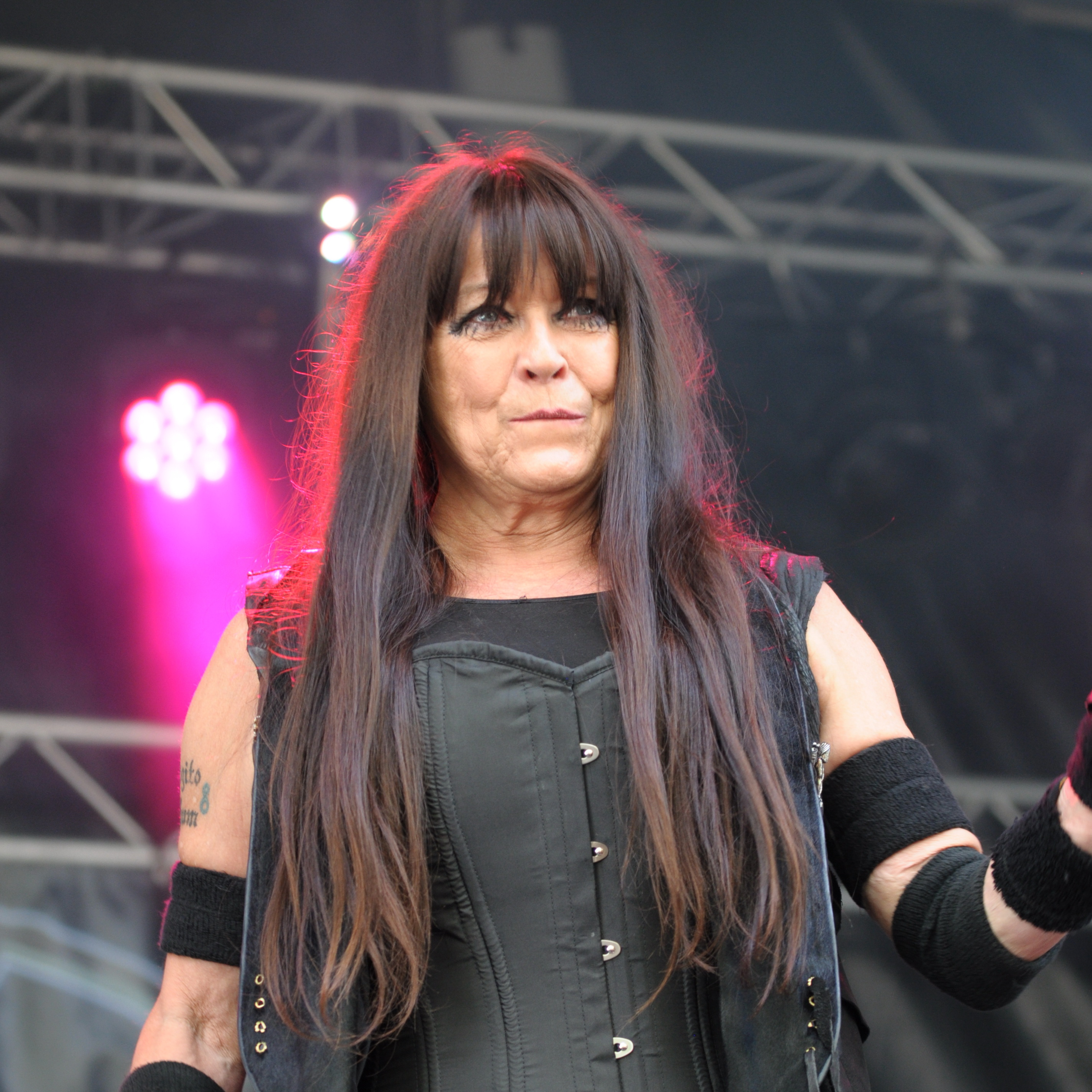

Background information
- Born: October 19, 1947 (age 78)
- Years active: 1960s–present
- Website: http://www.jutta-weinhold.com/

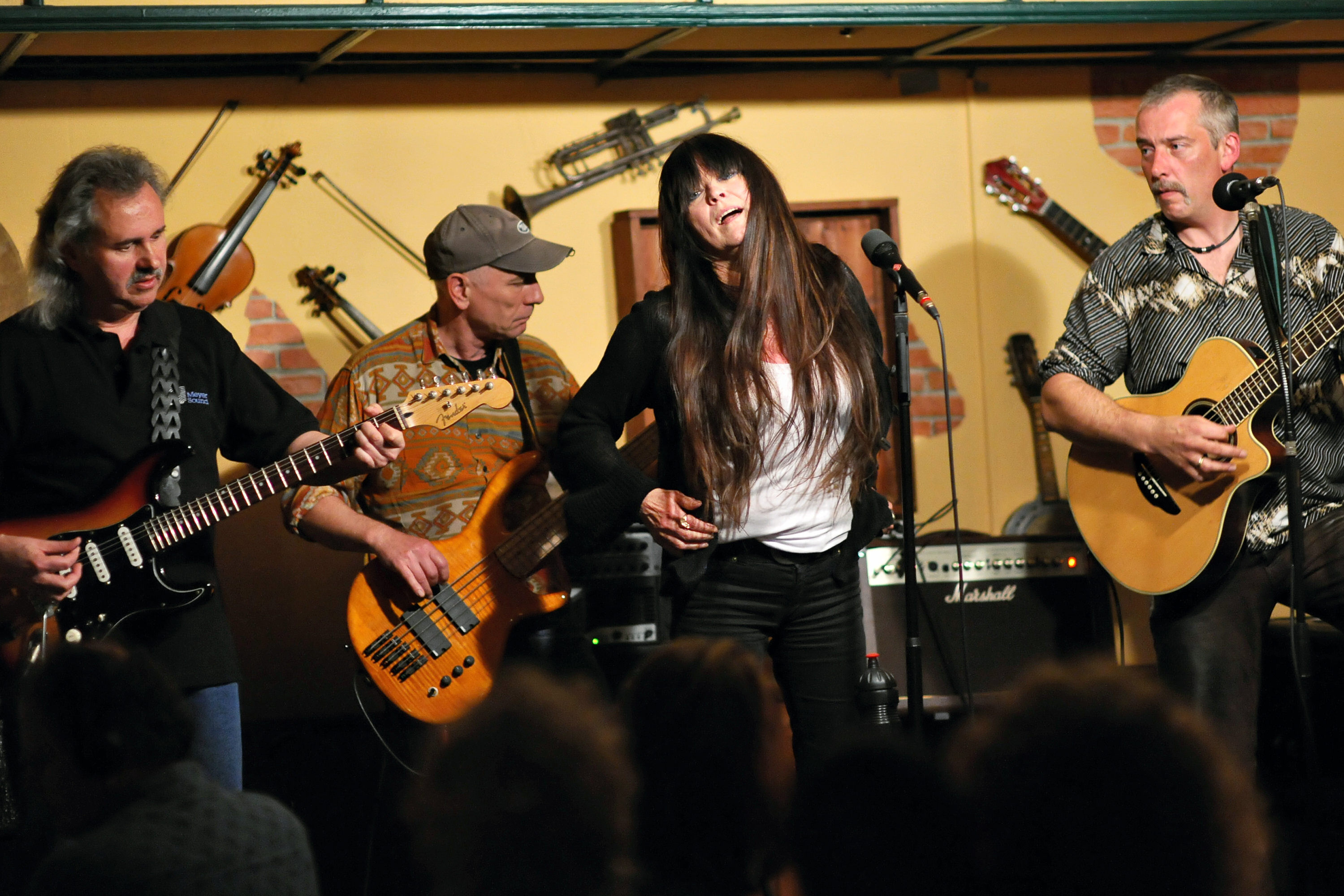
Jutta Weinhold's Akustik Randale (2009)

Jutta Weinhold (born 19 October 1947) is a German rock singer.

== Biography ==
Jutta Weinhold was born in Mainz. In the late 1960s, she sang in amateur bands. In 1969, she was engaged in the role of "Sheila" in the musical Hair, followed by engagements in the musicals Godspell and Jesus Christ Superstar in 1972. In 1974 she made some appearances with Amon Düül II and appeared in the television program Disco. Weinhold has been playing blues-sessions with the Kaftan-Blues-Band since 1975. In 1976, she released the LP Coming under her name, which was followed by Jutta Weinhold in 1978. From 1976 to 1978, she was a guest musician with Udo Lindenberg. As a result, from this collaboration, Udo Lindenberg's first live album, Livehaftig, on which Weinhold had sung all female vocal parts, was released in 1979. For a production of the Senate of Berlin the Jutta Weinhold Band recorded the LP Mach 'nen Bogen um die Drogen (Avoid Drugs) in 1980. In 1982, she released the German album Volksmusik with the formation Breslau. Due to the misleading naming and the album's provocative lyrics, she was accused of having sympathies for right-wing thoughts.

Her band Zed Yago, founded in 1985, is considered to be a pioneer in the genre of dramatic metal. The band's concept albums deal with the experiences of a fictitious daughter of the Flying Dutchman. After a legal dispute, the project later changed its name to Velvet Viper. However, Zed Yago's success could not be continued and they disbanded.

In addition to her own projects, Weinhold is also active as a session and studio musician. In October 2011, Weinhold published her first book, Die Tochter des Fliegenden Holländers: Auf der Suche nach der verlorenen PhantaSIE (The daughter of the Flying Dutchman: In search of the lost PhantaSIE), which once again is about the daughter of the Flying Dutchman. Weinhold also had small appearances in supporting roles in films. Since 2012, she now performs with the Jutta Weinhold Band.

== Selected works ==
Solo:

- "Cadillac (fahr weg)" / "Ticket nach Memphis" (Single) (1974)
- Coming (1976)
- Jutta Weinhold (1978)

with Jutta.Weinhold-Band:

- Mach 'nen Bogen um die Drogen (LP) (1980) (one song only)

with Weinhold:

- To Be Or Not ... (1993)
- From Heaven Through The World To Hell (2004)
- Below The Line (2006)
- Read Between The Lines (2010)

with Breslau:

- Volksmusik (1982)

with Zed Yago:

- From Over Yonder (1988)
- Pilgrimage (1989)

with Velvet Viper:

- Velvet Viper (1990)
- The 4th Quest For Fantasy (1992)
- Respice Finem (2018)
- The Pale Man is Holding a Broken Heart (2019)
- Cosmic Healer (2021)
