= Rat Race (album) =

Studio album by Child'ƨ Play
- Released: June 26, 1990
- Recorded: 1989–1990
- Studios: Sheffield Studios, Phoenix, Maryland; Sunset Sound, Hollywood, California; Sunset Sound (Studio 2), Hollywood, California
- Genres: Heavy metal; glam metal; hard rock; blues rock
- Length: 45:28
- Label: Chrysalis
- Producer: Howard Benson

Child'ƨ Play chronology
Ruff House (1986)	Rat Race (1990)	Long Way (1993)

Singles from Rat Race
- 1. "Rat Race" Released: 1990; 2. "Day After Night" Released: 1990; 3. "Wind" Released: 1990

Rat Race is the debut studio album by hard rock/heavy metal band Child'ƨ Play, released on June 26, 1990, through Chrysalis Records. It was produced by Howard Benson, who would later go on to produce for Motörhead, Sepultura, and Seether. It is the first album to feature new bassist Marion Idzi, going by the mononym Idzi. It is also the first album to feature Brian Jack on lead vocals, as previous vocalist Lawrence Hinshaw left the band in 1988, who only appeared on the band's 1986 EP, Ruff House. The band released three singles from the album, the title track which was the only song to have an MTV music video, "Day After Night", and "Wind".

== Critical reception ==
Professional ratings
Review scores
Source	Rating
AllMusic	2/5 stars

Richard Egan at AllMusic gave Rat Race four and a half stars out of five. The album was a regional success in the band's hometown of Baltimore, Maryland, and they toured nationally opening for the band, Cold Sweat. The band parted ways with Brian Jack in 1991 and pursued a solo career. Brian was first replaced by Ty Crook in the Winter of 1992 then by Tommy McRae in late 1992.

== Track listing ==
All tracks are written by Child's Play.

No.	Title	Writer(s)	Length
1.	"Good Ol' Rock And Roll"	Nicky Kay, John Allen	4:26
2.	"Day After Night"	Brian Jack	3:28
3.	"My Bottle"	Nicky Kay, John Allen	4:40
4.	"Rat Race"	John Allen, Nicky Kay, Marion Idzi	3:28
5.	"Wind"	Marion Idzi	3:50
6.	"Evicted"	Lawrence Hinshaw	3:48
7.	"Knock Me Out"	John Allen, Nicky Kay	3:29
8.	"Girl Like You"	John Allen, Nicky Kay, Marion Idzi, Brian Jack	3:45
9.	"Capricorn/Bang Bang"	Marion Idzi, Nicky Kay, John Allen	3:58
10.	"Pay Your Dues"	John Allen	3:13
11.	"Damned If I Do"	Lawrence Hinshaw, John Allen	3:49
12.	"When Hell Freezes Over"	John Allen, Brian Jack	3:34
Total length:			45:28

== Personnel ==
=== Child's Play ===
- Brian Jack - lead vocals, guitars
- Nicky Kay - guitars, backing vocals
- Idzi - bass, backing vocals
- John Allen - drums, backing vocals, lead vocals on "Evicted" and "Pay Your Dues", co-lead vocals on "Rat Race"

=== Production ===
- Howard Benson – producers, engineers, mixing
- Marty Wachter – engineers, mixing
