= Spectrum of Death =

Studio album by Morbid Saint
- Released: 1989 (original); September 2, 1990 (reissue)
- Recorded: 1988
- Studios: Opus Recordings, Gurnee, Illinois
- Genres: Thrash metal, death metal
- Length: 32:00
- Label: Avanzada Metálica
- Producer: Eric "Griffy" Greif

Morbid Saint chronology
Lock up Your Children (Demo) (1988)	Spectrum of Death (1989)	Destruction System (Demo) (1992)

Spectrum of Death is the debut album by American death/thrash metal band Morbid Saint. It is considered one of the best thrash metal albums of all time and an early influence on the blackened thrash metal and death metal genres.

== Overview ==
Spectrum of Death is actually a reissue of the band's 1988 demo Lock Up Your Children, which was licensed by Edge Entertainment to Mexican label Avanzada Metálica, who re-released it as a full-length studio album under the title Spectrum of Death in 1989; however, the album was not released in other territories until years later. It was recorded at Opus Recording (later known as Wave Digital once they removed the 2 inch tape machines in favor of Akai Digital Audio Machines) in Gurnee, Illinois. It was produced by Eric Greif and engineered by Al Pangeliron.

== Reception ==
Professional ratings
Review scores
Source	Rating
AllMusic	4.5/5 stars
Sputnikmusic	3.5/5 stars

Spectrum of Death is often hailed as one of the best thrash metal albums ever made, as well as one of the fastest and most abrasive in the genre; which led Morbid Saint being compared to other thrash metal bands like Kreator, Slayer, Sadus, and Demolition Hammer.

Retrospectively, Drew Tyler of Sputnikmusic would say, "This is an album that’s so heavy, it gave me a goddamn headache, an album that stands the test of time to this very day, an album that single-handedly defines what it means to thrash...This is the band’s first and last offering to the world, and although this is the only album they made, it still without a doubt made an impact on the late 80’s thrash scene."

== Track listing ==
All songs on Spectrum of Death are published by Griffy Guy Publishing (BMI).

No.	Title	Length
1.	"Lock Up Your Children"	3:30
2.	"Burned at the Stake"	2:16
3.	"Assassin"	7:03
4.	"Damien"	2:46
5.	"Crying for Death"	3:47
6.	"Spectrum of Death"	0:42
7.	"Scars"	7:09
8.	"Beyond the Gates of Hell"	4:47
Total length:		32:00

== Personnel ==
Morbid Saint

- Pat Lind - vocals
- Jim Fergades - guitar
- Jay Visser - guitar
- Tony Paletti - bass
- Lee Reynolds - drums

Production

- Eric "Griffy" Greif - producer, mixing
- Alan Pangelinan - engineer
- Peter Lupini - production Assistant
- John Kujawa - cover artwork

== Notes ==
- The 2005 limited edition CD re-issue by Keltic Records contains the Destruction System demo as bonus tracks. It was released without the band's consent and is considered a bootleg
- The 2008 CD re-issue by Power Play Records features an alternate cover art
- Spectrum of Death was bootlegged in Russia in 2013 and was sold at online retail websites like eBay
- The 2016 2-CD extended edition re-issue by Century Media Records contains the Destruction System demo and The Black Tape demo on Disc 1. Disc 2 contains the 2015 remastered version of Destruction System and 4 songs that were recorded from 2010 to 2011
- The 2016 12" vinyl release was re-issued as limited edition, coming in 4 colors. It is a "special" vinyl mastering, 180g vinyl including an 8-page LP-sized booklet with rare photos, flyers, interview and gatefold, limited to 1000 copies
- The 2016 2-CD re-issue by Pacheco Records contains all content from the Century Media Records CD release, plus never before seen photos and an interview with the band
- The 2019 12" limited edition vinyl by High Roller Records comes in 4 colors, issued in a 425gsm heavy cardboard cover, poster and lyric sheet printed on uncoated paper. Limited to 1000 copies
- Only 50 copies (others speak of 80 copies) of a limited edition A5 digipak CD by Gates of Hell Productions were made available and 20 promos of the 500 that were pressed because Avanzada Metálica was planning to re-release this album in A5 format, as part of a series of re-releases from the label's back catalog, but an agreement with the band was unfulfilled. The remaining copies were destroyed
