= Poema Arcanus =

- Origin: Santiago, Chile
- Genres: Doom/death metal
- Years active: 1991–present
- Labels: Picorocos Records, Rawforce Productions, Aftermath Music
- Members: Claudio Carrasco García - Vocals; Juan Díaz - Bass; Igor Leiva Benavides - Guitars; Luis Moya - Drums
- Past members: Pablo Tapia; Italo Martinez; Claudio Botarro Neira; Roxana Espinoza; Michel Leroy; Eduardo Zenteno; Alonso
- Website: http://www.poemaarcanus.cl/

Poema Arcanus is a Chilean death/doom metal band that was formed in the early 1990s and has six full-length studio albums under their name. The band was originally named Garbage; they later changed their name to Garbage Breed and eventually settled on their current name of Poema Arcanus. Influences of Poema Arcanus include, among others, Autopsy, Candlemass, Fields of the Nephilim, My Dying Bride, Paradise Lost, Queensrÿche, Solitude Aeturnus, and Voivod. This band has been a live supporting act for bands such as Napalm Death, Moonspell, and Candlemass. They are currently signed to Transcending Obscurity Records.

== Line-up ==
=== Current members ===
- Claudio Carrasco – vocals (1991 onward)
- Juan Díaz - bass guitar (2018 onward)
- Igor Leiva – guitars (1991 onward)
- Luis Moya – drums (1999 onward)

=== Former members ===
- Michel Leroy – keyboards
- Claudio Botarro – bass guitar
- Pablo Tapia - bass guitar
- Juan Pablo Vallejos - bass guitar
- Igor Leiva – guitars
- Eduardo Zenteno – drums
- Roxana Espinoza – keyboards
- Alonso – drums

== Discography ==
- Underdeveloped (under the moniker Garbage; demo, 1995)
- Innocent Shades (under the moniker Garbage Breed; demo, 1996)
- Promo Tape (demo, 1997)
- Southern Winds (demo, 1998)
- Arcane XIII (full-length, 1999)
- Iconoclast (full-length, 2002)
- Buried Songs: the Early Times (compilation, 2003)
- Telluric Manifesto (full-length, 2005)
- Timeline Symmetry (full-length, 2009)
- Transient Chronicles (2012)
