= Horsecore: An Unrelated Story That's Time Consuming =

Studio album by Dead Horse
- Released: June 1989
- Recorded: 1989
- Genre: Crossover thrash, thrash metal, death metal
- Length: 28:56
- Label: Death Ride Records

Dead Horse chronology
Horsecore: An Unrelated Story That's Time Consuming (1989)	Peaceful Death and Pretty Flowers (1991)

Horsecore: An Unrelated Story That's Time Consuming is the debut album by the Houston, Texas based death/thrash metal band Dead Horse. It was released in 1989 on the independent label Death Ride Records, and again ten years later on Relapse Records, with accompanying bonus tracks consisting of the material from their 1988 demo Death Rides a Dead Horse.

== Reception ==
Professional ratings
Review scores
Source	Rating
AllMusic	3/5 stars

Steve Huey of AllMusic called Horsecore a "trashy amalgamation of thrash, death metal and grindcore."

== Track listing ==
All tracks are written by Dead Horse.

No.	Title	Length
1.	"Murder Song"	2:55
2.	"Born Believing"	1:40
3.	"Crushing of the Irate"	1:51
4.	"Hank"	2:12
5.	"Bewah"	1:37
6.	"World War Whatever"	2:16
7.	"Forgive"	1:42
8.	"Army Surplus"	1:34
9.	"Piece of Veal"	1:18
10.	"Mindless Zombies"	2:40
11.	"Adult Book Store"	1:21
12.	"Flowers for the Dead"	1:33
13.	"Too Close to Home"	1:29
14.	"Scottish Hell"	2:43
15.	"Subhumanity"	1:40
16.	"Someone"	0:25
Total length:		28:56

1999 reissue
No.	Title	Length
1.	"Murder Song"	2:55
2.	"Born Believing"	1:40
3.	"Crushing of the Irate"	1:51
4.	"Hank"	2:12
5.	"Bewah"	1:37
6.	"World War Whatever"	2:16
7.	"Forgive"	1:42
8.	"Army Surplus"	1:34
9.	"Piece of Veal"	1:18
10.	"Mindless Zombies"	2:40
11.	"Adult Book Store"	1:21
12.	"Flowers for the Dead"	1:33
13.	"Too Close to Home"	1:29
14.	"Scottish Hell"	2:43
15.	"Subhumanity"	1:40
16.	"Someone"	0:25
17.	"Army Surplus" (tracks 17–22 are demo versions)	1:35
18.	"World War Whatever"	1:50
19.	"Bewah"	1:49
20.	"Born Believing"	1:44
21.	"Scottish Hell"	2:46
22.	"Subhumanity"	7:13
Total length:		45:53

== Personnel ==
- Michael Haaga – vocals, guitars
- Greg Martin – guitars, backing vocals
- Allen (Alpo) Price – bass, backing vocals
- Ronnie Guyote – drums, backing vocals
