= Into Darkness (album) =

Studio album by Winter
- Released: May 1990
- Recorded: April–May 1990
- Studio: S.O.S. Studios
- Genre: Death-doom
- Length: 46:08
- Labels: Future Shock; Nuclear Blast (Re-issue)
- Producers: Greg Marchak, Winter

Winter chronology
Hour of Doom (1989)	Into Darkness (1990)	Eternal Frost (1994)

Into Darkness is the first and only full-length album of American doom metal band Winter. The album was released in 1990 by Future Shock Records.The first CD re-issue by Nuclear Blast America (distributed by Relapse in the US) in 1992 had only the "Into Darkness" tracks. It was later re-issued by Nuclear Blast as a digipak with an altered front cover and the Eternal Frost EP as bonus tracks. The album was re-released again, with no bonus tracks, by Southern Lord on April 12, 2011, on black and white vinyl as a gate fold LP with booklet.

== Music ==
In the book Doomed to Fail, author JJ Anselmi said the vocals of John Alman on the album "sit somewhere between hardcore shouts and grindcore growls". The band utilized keys in their sound to create an atmospheric feel, which proved divisive among hardened death metal fans. However, Anselmi concluded that this would eventually become "another of the group's lasting contributions to funeral and death-doom".

== Critical reception ==
Eduardio Rivadavia of AllMusic gave the album three and a half stars out of five, and said that "the album is metal at its most unpalatable and indigestible, but it's so purposeful and convincing that it naturally transcends most accusations of, well, just plain sucking."

== Legacy ==
Many consider the album to be the first proper release in the death-doom subgenre.

July 8, 2013: The Village Voice blogger Jason Roche lists Into Darkness as #14 in the top 20 hardcore and metal albums to come out of NYC.

Decibel ranked the album at #13 in the Top 100 Doom Metal Albums of All Time Special Issue.

== Track listing ==
- All lyrics by Joe Goncalves. All music written and arranged by Winter.

No.	Title	Length
1.	"Oppression Freedom / Oppression (Reprise)" (Instrumental)	5:57
2.	"Servants of the Warsmen"	4:24
3.	"Goden"	8:18
4.	"Power and Might" (Instrumental)	2:44
5.	"Destiny"	8:31
6.	"Eternal Frost"	6:47
7.	"Into Darkness"	9:26

== Personnel ==
Winter

- John Alman – vocals, bass
- Stephen Flam – all guitars
- Tony Pinnisi – keyboards
- Joe Goncalves - Drums

Production

- Produced by Greg Marchak and Winter
