= Go All the Way (China album) =

Studio album by China
- Released: 1991
- Genre: Hard rock
- Length: 58:45
- Label: Vertigo
- Producers: Stephan Galfas, James Palace

China chronology
Live (1991)	Go All the Way (1991)	Natural Groove (1995)

Singles from Go All the Way
- 1. "Slow Dancing in Hell" Released: 1991; 2. "Life Keeps Moving On" Released: 1991

Go All the Way is the third album by hard rock band China. It was released in 1991 by the label Vertigo. The vocalist in this album is Eric St. Michaels.

== Track listing ==
No.	Title	Length
1.	"Pictures of You"	5:01
2.	"Medicine Man (Intro)"	0:27
3.	"Medicine Man"	4:05
4.	"Slow Dancing in Hell"	5:04
5.	"She Did a Real Good Job"	4:09
6.	"So Damn Easy"	5:14
7.	"Lost Gardens"	0:47
8.	"Shake Your Cages"	4:26
9.	"Go All the Way"	5:10
10.	"Don't Let in the Night"	4:32
11.	"In Love Again"	4:30
12.	"Face to the Wind"	1:00
13.	"In Trouble with Angels"	4:05
14.	"Life Keeps Moving On"	5:03
15.	"You've Got Me"	5:17

== Charts ==
Chart (1991)	Peak position
Swiss Albums (Schweizer Hitparade)	10
