= Death Ride =

A death ride is a course of action which is (or appears) certain or very likely to result in death, failure, or defeat. It may specifically refer to:

== Military ==
- Von Bredow's Death Ride, a Prussian cavalry charge at the Battle of Mars-la-Tour in 1870.
- Death Ride at Jutland, a counter attack by German battlecruisers on the British fleet at the Battle of Jutland in 1916.

== Entertainment ==
- "Death Ride", the third episode in the original 1975 American television series Starsky & Hutch
