= Auf Wiedersehen (Equinox album) =

Studio album by Equinox
- Released: 1989
- Studio: Athletic Sound, Halden
- Genre: Thrash metal
- Length: 38:41
- Label: BMG, RCA
- Producer: Equinox, Kai Andersen

Equinox chronology
Auf Wiedersehen (1989)	The Way to Go (1990)

Auf Wiedersehen is the first full-length album by Fredrikstad-based thrash metal band Equinox. It was released in 1989.

The recording reportedly took 45 hours and cost 35,000 kr. It was published independently by Laughing Deer with a release concert at Speilet in Fredrikstad. Of a 1,000 pressed copies, some hundred were sold, mostly locally around Fredrikstad, before BMG Ariola bought the rest and gave it distribution. The title, which is German for "see you again", was conceived as a message beyond death from a man who was executed by a dictatorship.

It received positive reviews, with reviewers asserting that it was the heaviest metal album Norway had seen until then, "hard as bone", "heavy as lead" and also "a diamond in the rough". It also had more finesse than all-out thrash, as well as good lyrics. Some complained that the lyrics were unintelligible, but Equinox provided a lyric sheet. The live rendition of the songs "makes you believe the story about the walls of Jericho".

Some reviewers only gave 3 out of 6. The album was "a orgy in more or less organized noise, supplemented by grim primal screams from vocalist Grim Stene who probably eats live rats for breakfast", wrote Stavanger Aftenblad. It was unfitting for "tender souls", and became "somewhat unyielding in the long run".

== Track listing ==
- All lyrics by Grim Stene. All music by Equinox, except where noted.

Studio album
No.	Title	Writer(s)	Length
1.	"Stop"		3:16
2.	"Auf Wiedersehen"	Mefisto	5:52
3.	"The King"		4:32
4.	"Pharaoh Dance"		3:12
5.	"Violins"		3:02
6.	"The Floating Man"		3:39
7.	"House of Wonders"		3:32
8.	"Realm of Darkness"		4:23
9.	"Dead by Dawn"		7:13

== Personnel ==
- Grim Stene – guitars, lead vocals
- Tommy Skarning – guitars
- Skule Stene – bass
- Ragnar Westin – drums
