= Marcus Greatwood =

British freediving coach

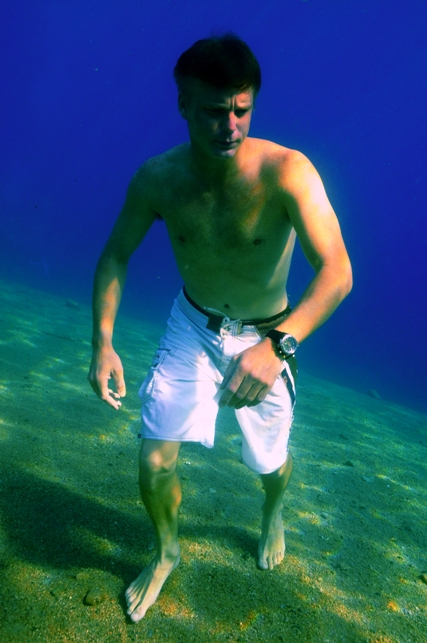
- Born: 18 March 1973 (age 53); United Kingdom
- Occupations: Free-diver, Freedive Coach, Lecturer

Marcus Greatwood (born 18 March 1973) is a British freediving coach. He is most noted for his creation and development of "NT Style" Freediving, based on relaxation and breathing techniques.

== Career ==
He initiated NT Style in 2008. He has coached many athletes, setting 12 UK National records in all of the AIDA recognised disciplines. He has personally held several UK records in depth apnea free-diving disciplines recognized by AIDA International.

His Club Freediving (NoTanx) based in London became the largest group of freedivers in the UK. It has grown since 2001 to include 7 weekly pool sessions with 100+ active members. All training is split into Yin and Yang, with an emphasis placed on Yin (soft, slow and internal).

=== Competitive freediver ===
Greatwood is an international freediver. He set two UK records, Free Immersion -47m and Constant weight No fins -25m, in NDAC in 2003. and bettered the Free Immersion to 50m in 2004. In 2007 he was ranked 13 in the World. He started competing again in 2010.

=== International Coach ===
Greatwood coached Herbert Nitsch from 2006 – 2008, including his No Limits dive to 214m and 2 Constant Weight World Records. He coached Alan Barber to a Dynamic No Fins record of 127m and several Dynamic Records culminating in the 2009 record of 202m.

Marcus coached Sam Still (Former world Freediving champion) as well as other athletes from the NoTanx Stable. In 2012 15 club members featured in the top 10 of their National Rankings.

=== Breathold Photographer ===
Breathold Photography and Videography became a passion in 2010 since then he has won several international awards such as 2018 festival Mondial de l'image sous-marine and 2019 Underwater Photographer of the year As well as regular publication in Diver Magazine Which usually focus on Marcus' Dark Water Diving expeditions (Subterranean Lake Dives).

Marcus also teaches/gives seminars based around photography and exploratory expeditions.

== Innovations ==
Marcus worked closely with World Record holder and founder of AIDA International Loïc Leferme from 2001 helping to develop the Lanyard and other techniques that have become integral to competitive freediving. Loic's concept of relaxation and enjoyment was inspirational and Instrumental in the NT Style. Greatwood's mentally targeted and correctly constructed training regimens were innovations within the sport in 2003–4. He became a student and advocate of Aharon Solomons in 2002.

== Sources ==
- "AIDA International". 2008. Archived from the original on 26 April 2007.
- "British Freediving Association". 2008.
- "British Freediving Association". 2009.
- "Apnea Mania". 2007. Archived from the original on 28 January 2007.
- "AIDA International". 2010. Archived from the original on 26 April 2007.
- "Freedive central". 2010.
- "Marcus Greatwood". 2008.
