= Isole (band) =

Swedish epic doom metal band

Background information
- Origin: Gävle, Sweden
- Genres: Epic doom metal
- Years active: 1990–present
- Labels: I Hate Records; Napalm Records; Cyclone Empire
- Members: Daniel Bryntse; Jimmy Mattsson; Crister Olsson
- Past members: Henka; Magnus Helin; Magnus Björk; Per Sandgren; Jan Larsson; Kim Molin; Jonas Lindström

Isole is a Swedish epic doom metal band that is currently signed to German record label Cyclone Empire.

== History ==
Formed in 1990 under the name Forlorn, the band released several demos before changing their name to "Isole" in 2003 in order to avoid confusion with other bands named Forlorn.

In 2005, Isole released their debut album, Forevermore through I Hate Records. In 2006, they also released The Beyond and Throne of Void through I Hate Records.

In 2008, Isole's third studio album, Bliss of Solitude, was released through a different label, Napalm Records.

Their 2009 album Silent Ruins was also released through Napalm Records. Silent Ruins is a concept album about a man who wakes up without any memory of his life in a post-apocalyptic world; he slowly gains memories about himself but fears that this will lead to a devastating conclusion for him. Crister Olsson stated in an interview that the story of Silent Ruins will be continued on a future album, possibly two future albums, one of which might not be Isole's next studio album. In October 2011, the band's latest album, Born from Shadows, was released.

=== The Calm Hunter (2013 – present) ===
In late 2013, Isole started the production of their future album. On 28 May 2014, the band split with their record label, Napalm Records. They later signed with Cyclone Empire on 29 July 2014. Their next album, "The Calm Hunter" through this label is scheduled for release on the 28th of November 2014.

On 15 October 2014 the band released the track listings for The Calm Hunter. On 28 October 2014, a statement was released on the band's website that Jonas Lindström would be departing the band: "It is with sadness that we announce that Jonas will leave Isole. He will surely be missed! We wish him the best of luck with everything and we had a great time together in Isole. Hopefully we will be able announce a replacement behind the drumkit soon!". The last show that Jonas performed with Isole took place on 28 November 2014.

== Line-up ==
=== Current members ===
- Daniel Bryntse - guitars, vocals (2004–present), drums (2005)
- Jimmy Mattsson - bass, harsh vocals (2012–present)
- Crister Olsson - guitars, vocals (2004–present)
- Victor Parri - drums (2014-present)

=== Former members ===
- Jonas Lindström - drums (2004 - 2014)
- Kim Molin - drums
- Magnus Helin - guitar
- Jan Larsson - bass
- Magnus Björk - guitar, vocals
- Per Sandgren - guitar
- Henrik Lindenmo - bass, harsh vocals

== Discography ==
=== As Isole ===
- Promo 2004 (demo, 2004)
- Forevermore (full-length, 2005)
- The Beyond (EP, 2006)
- Throne of Void (full-length, 2006)
- Bliss of Solitude (full-length, 2008)
- Silent Ruins (full-length, 2009)
- Born From Shadows (full-length, 2011)
- The Calm Hunter (full-length, 2014)
- Dystopia (full-length, 2019)
- Anesidora (full-length, 2023)
