= Morbid Saint =

American thrash metal band

- Origin: Sheboygan, Wisconsin, U.S.
- Genres: Death metal, thrash metal
- Years active: 1984–1994, 2010–present
- Labels: Edge; Avanzada Metalica; Grind Core; Power Play; Keltic; Relapse; Century Media
- Members: Jay Visser: Bob Zabel; Patrick Lind; Jim Fergades; DJ Bagemehl
- Past members: Lee Reynolds; Mike Chapa; Tony Paletti; Bob Sinjakovic; Gary Beimel; Cliff Wagner; Martin Russell Gesch
- Website: morbidsaint.com

Morbid Saint is an American death/thrash metal band from Sheboygan, Wisconsin. The band are known for influencing blackened thrash and death metal.

After splitting up about five years following the release of their debut album, Spectrum of Death (1989), Morbid Saint reunited in 2010 and released their first album in 26 years, Destruction System, in 2015. Their third album, Swallowed by Hell, was released on February 9, 2024.

== History ==
Morbid Saint was formed on November 1, 1984 in Sheboygan, Wisconsin. The band released the 1988 demo Lock Up Your Children, licensed by Edge Entertainment to Mexican label Avanzada Metálica, who reissued it as a full-length album in 1989 as Spectrum of Death. It was not released in other territories until years later. In 1992, they released the fan-exclusive demo Destruction System as an advance cassette for a planned yet ultimately unreleased second full-length. The single-sided demo The Black Tape was released later that year, containing four tracks from the Destruction System demo. The band split-up in 1994.

In early 2010, Morbid Saint reunited with a new line-up, performing various shows in the U.S. and abroad, including the 2012 Maryland Deathfest, Metal on the Rocks in Mexico City and the 2013 Keep It True festival in Germany. In 2012, the band released the compilation album Thrashaholic, containing Spectrum of Death and Destruction System in remastered CD-R format, with four new songs and a live DVD in DVD-R format.

In 2014, the band released the live album Beyond the States of Hell, recorded live from Beijing. In November 2015, Destruction System was officially released as the band's second full-length album that was originally intended for release in 1992, but went unfinished since then, with new artwork.

By 2022, Morbid Saint were writing their third album, called Swallowed by Hell, released on February 9, 2024.

== Band members ==
Current members

- Jay Visser – guitar (1984–1994, 2010–present)
- Jim Fergades – guitar (1984–1994, 2010, 2022–present)
- Pat Lind – vocals (1988–1994, 2010–2016, 2022–present)
- Bob Zabel – bass (2010–present)
- DJ Bagemehl – drums (2016–present)

Former members

- Lee Reynolds – drums (1984–1994)
- Mike Chapa – vocals, bass (1984–1987)
- Tony Paletti – bass (1987–1990)
- Bob Sinjakovic – vocals (1987–1988)
- Gary Beimel – bass (1990–1994)
- Chris Jacobs – drums (2010)
- Randy Wall – drums (2010–2016)
- Kevin Koski – guitar (2011–2013)
- Marco Martell – guitar (2015–2016)
- Cliff Wagner – vocals (2016–2022)
- Martin Russell Gesch – guitar (2016–2022)

Timeline

== Discography ==
Studio albums

- Spectrum of Death (1989)
- Destruction System (2015, recorded in 1992)
- Swallowed by Hell (2024)

Live albums

- Beyond the States of Hell (2014)

Demos

- Lock up Your Children (1988)
- Destruction System (1992)
