= Titan Force =

American power metal band

- Origin: Colorado Springs, Colorado, United States
- Genres: Power metal, progressive metal
- Years active: 1983–present
- Labels: Skol, Shark, US Metal
- Members: Harry Conklin; John Flores; Stefan Flores; Mario Flores; John McDaniel
- Past members: James Dikes; Bill Richardson (d. 1998)

Titan Force is an American power metal band from Colorado Springs, Colorado.

== History ==
The band was formed in 1983 by three brothers: Mario (electric guitar), John (bass, vocals) and Stefan Flores (drums) under the name Titan. Together, they recorded a demo that contained four songs. Guitarist and keyboardist Bill Richardson joined the band following the demo release. They played some local gigs and opened concerts by Jag Panzer. In 1989, their self-titled debut album was released on US Metal Records, with Jag Panzer lead singer, Harry Conklin, on vocals. In 1991, the band released their second studio album, Winner / Loser. Following a tour in Germany with Anvil and Scene X Dream, the band separated from their label and returned to the United States. After several years of unsuccessful concerts, the band disbanded after Conklin returned to Jag Panzer in 1994.

The band has continued to make occasional appearances on stage, such as at Bang Your Head!!!, a German heavy metal and hard rock festival.

In 2014, Titan Force signed with Skol Records, and released a compilation album, Force of the Titan, which included previously unreleased songs.

== Style ==
Titan Force is often described as a mixture of Queensrÿche and Fates Warning.

== Discography ==
- Demo 1987 (Demo, 1987, self-published)
- Titan Force (Album, 1989, US Metal Records)
- Blaze of Glory (Demo, 1989, self-published)
- Winner / Loser (Album, 1991, Shark Records)
- Only the Strong (Demo, 1994, self-published)
- All What It Is (Compilation, 2001, Shark Records)
- Force of the Titan (Compilation, 2014, Skol Records)
