= China (band) =

Swiss hard rock band

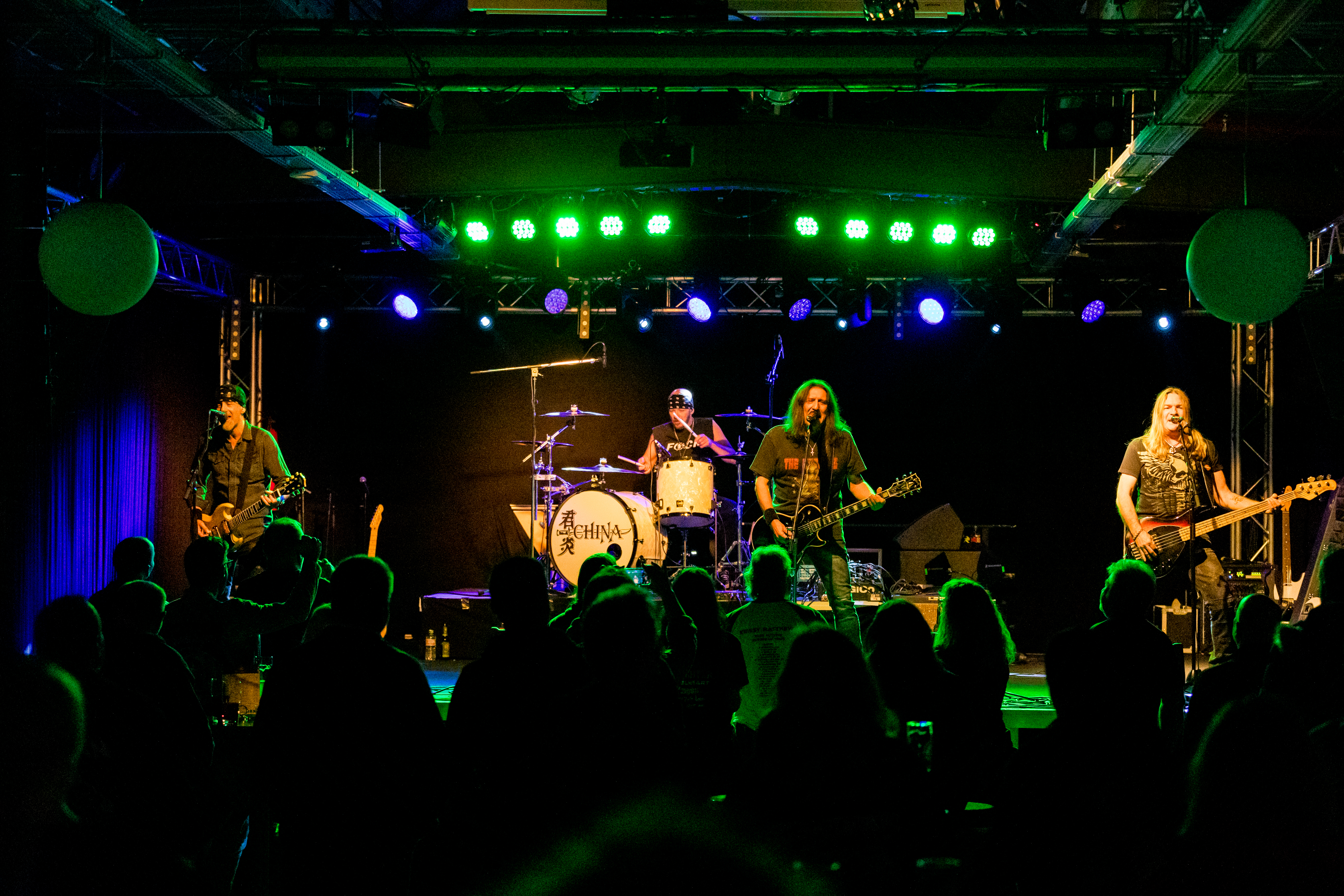
- China performing in Hesse, Germany 2024

Background information
- Origin: Switzerland
- Genres: Hard rock, glam metal
- Years active: 1985–present
- Labels: Vertigo/Phonogram, EMI, Universal, Metal Heaven, Blue Martin/K-tel
- Members: Claudio Matteo; Freddy Scherer; Hardy Hartmeier; Marc Lynn; Ralph "Tosi" Tosoni
- Past members: Brian Kofmehl; Douglas McCowan; Johnny Giorgi; Freddy Laurence; John Dommen; Marc Storace; Patrick Mason; Math Shiverow; Eric St. Michaels; Mack Schildknecht; Dan Grossenbacher; Billy La Pietra
- Website: www.rockbandchina.com

China is a hard rock band from Winterthur, Switzerland, founded in 1985. In 1988 they signed with Phonogram, releasing their debut album the same year. They are best known for their 1989 single "In the Middle of the Night", which peaked at No. 11 in Switzerland. As of 2013, all of the band's studio albums have entered the Top 40 album charts in Switzerland.

== Biography ==
Formed in 1985, the original line-up consisted of vocalist Math Shiverow, guitarists Claudio Matteo (formerly of Bloody Six and Danger) and Freddy Laurence, bassist Marc Lynn (formerly of Stormbringer), and drummer John Dommen. By 1988, China had signed a record contract with the German branch of Phonogram Records, resulting in the band's eponymous debut album, which reached No. 6 on the Swiss albums chart.

Before their 1989 sophomore effort, Sign In The Sky, former Crown vocalist/guitarist Patrick Mason (who had also briefly with Krokus and Fast Forward) replaced Shiverow on lead vocals, and Brian Kofmehl (formerly of Killer) took over bass duties from Lynn, who re-surfaced with Gotthard a couple of years later. Sign In The Sky, produced by Stephan Galfas and recorded in New York, would become China's most successful album. It reached No. 2 on the Swiss albums chart, eventually achieving gold status, and cracked the Top 50 in Germany, peaking at 45. The band supported the album with an extensive European tour as opening act for Yngwie Malmsteen.

Mason's tenure would be short lived due to health problems, and the band's 1991 Live album, recorded at the Marlboro Music Rock on September 29, 1990 in Locarno, Switzerland, featured yet another vocalist, Eric St. Michaels, formerly of Big Trouble. St. Michaels would make his studio debut on Go All The Way, released in 1991. Upon St. Michaels' exit and return to the U.S. in 1992, China teamed with vocalist Marc Storace of Krokus for several shows in 1993, including a concert broadcast live on Swiss national radio DRS3, issued in 2000 as the Alive album.

Newly signed to the EMI label and featuring yet another vocalist, Douglas McCowan, as well as Johnny Giorgi replacing Dommen on drums, 1995's Natural Groove saw the band explore markedly different musical territory. Struggling with the changing musical climate and financial difficulties, China announced their breakup shortly after the album's release.

Matteo and Kofmehl would reunite with Storace for the Acoustical Mountain unplugged project, performing covers as well as various China and Krokus songs. The trio played across Switzerland for several years.

The 'China Revisited' tour in 2000 had a line-up of Matteo, Laurence, Kofmehl, Giorgi, Shiverow, St. Michaels, and Storace. Laurence would also join former China bandmate Marc Lynn in Gotthard in May 2004, replacing the departing Mandy Meyer.

In the spring of 2007, Matteo received a call from Swiss concert promoters Free & Virgin, asking if China would be interested in reuniting for an appearance at the Spirit of Rock festival to play alongside Heaven & Hell, Mötley Crüe, Motörhead, U.D.O. and Saxon. This performance sparked a full-fledged reunion and the November 2009 'Rock Never Dies' tour in support of The Very Best of China album. China also made an appearance at Z Rock 2007 in Wigan, Greater Manchester, England.

On 25 March 2010, the band released Light Up The Dark, their first new studio album in 15 years, through Universal Music in Switzerland and the German label Metal Heaven in the rest of Europe. The line-up featured long-time members Matteo, St. Michaels and Kofmehl alongside newcomers Billy La Pietra (drums) and Mack Schildknecht (guitar) who had been joined the band in 2008 and 2009, respectively. They would support Krokus on a number of dates on their 2010 Hoodoo tour.

Dan Grossenbacher replaced Kofmehl on bass before the release of We Are The Stars in November 2013 via K-tel subsidiary Blue Martin. The album was produced by Tommy Henriksen, guitarist for Alice Cooper and old friend of St. Michaels. It was accompanied by a video for the single "Everywhere You Are".

== Band members ==
=== Current ===
- Hardy Hartmeier – lead vocals (1985-1986, 2019–present)
- Freddy Scherer – rhythm guitar, lead guitar (1985–present)
- Claudio Matteo – rhythm guitar (1985–present)
- Marc Lynn – bass (1985-1989, 2019–present)
- Ralph "Tosi" Tosoni - Drums (2020-present)

=== Former ===
- Math Shiverow – lead vocals (1985–1989; died 2025)
- Patrick Mason – lead vocals (1989–1990)
- Eric St. Michaels – lead vocals (1990–1992)
- Marc Storace – lead vocals (1992–1993, 2005-2015; Live)
- Douglas McCowan – lead vocals (1995; died 2026)
- Mack Schildknecht – guitar (2009-2010)
- John Dommen – drums (1985–1995)
- Johnny Giorgi – drums (1995–2000, 2007)
- Billy La Pietra – drums (2007–2010)

== Discography ==
=== Studio albums ===
Title	Album details	Peak chart positions	
Title	Album details	GER	SWI
China	Released: 1988; Label: Vertigo	—	6
Sign in the Sky	Released: 1989; Label: Vertigo	45	2
Go All the Way	Released: 1991; Label: Vertigo	—	10
Natural Groove	Released: 1995; Label: EMI	—	24
Light Up the Dark	Released: 2010; Label: Universal	—	39
We Are the Stars	Released: 2013; Label: Blue Martin	—	31
