= Intruder (American band) =

American thrash metal band

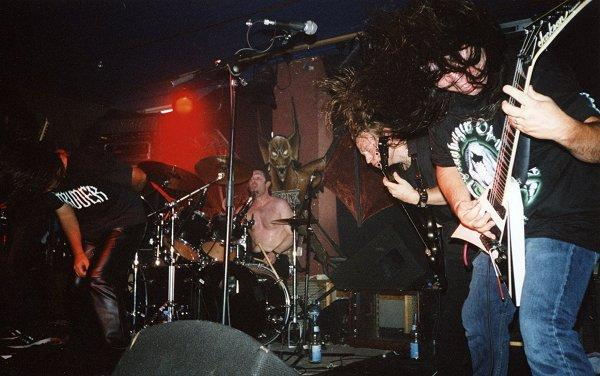
- Intruder performing live in Germany, 2004

Background information
- Origin: Nashville, Tennessee, U.S.
- Genres: Thrash metal, speed metal, progressive metal
- Years active: 1987–1992
- Labels: Hellion Records, Ironworks, Metal Blade
- Members: Jimmy Hamilton; Arthur Vinnett; Todd Nelson; John Pieroni
- Past members: Greg Messick; Garry Todd; Chris Veach

Intruder was an American thrash metal band from Nashville, Tennessee. Formerly known as "Transgresser", the group began as a four-piece cover band. They saw the addition of rhythm guitarist Greg Messick after signing with Metal Blade Records.

Intruder released three full-length studio albums and one EP from 1987 to 1991 before splitting up in 1992. Since then, the band has reunited several times to play live shows.

== History ==
The band was originally formed in 1984 under the name "Transgresser". They released demos in 1984 and 1986 (which would later appear on a re-release of their debut album). After going through several name changes they became known as "Intruder". They released their debut album Live to Die in 1987 as a four-piece band in the speed metal vein.

The band signed with Metal Blade Records in 1989. The Metal Blade years saw the entry of rhythm guitarist Greg Messick. Intruder released their second album, A Higher Form of Killing, in 1989 as a five-piece band. It presented a move away from speed metal to the thrash metal scene. Intruder released the very rare Escape from Pain EP in 1990. Admittedly released as "an excuse to tour", it featured songs recorded on previous releases as well as a cover of "25 or 6 to 4" by Chicago. It featured just one new song, the title track. Escape from Pain was the only one of their Metal Blade releases not to be issued on the three formats of CD, cassette and vinyl.

In 1991 Intruder released their final full-length album Psycho Savant. It was their only Metal Blade release to feature all original songs. After five years of releases and touring, the group disbanded in 1992. In a 2006 interview, Guitarist Greg Messick claimed that the band tried to stay together after being dropped from Metal Blade, but were ultimately unwilling due to inevitable lineup changes. Vocalist Jimmy Hamilton responded to the question of the band's split up in the same interview:

We got dropped from Metal Blade in the middle of our tour when we just hit the charts. Besides, although we had been together for so long, just like many marriage relationships there was no more 'love' and we said 'this marriage needs to end for a while. We need counseling'.

— Jimmy Hamilton

Intruder did an impressive amount of touring during their short career. Although little was done in the way of promotion, Intruder was able to tour for each release in the US, Canada and Mexico and shared stages with Helstar, Anvil and Morbid Angel. Since 2002, the group has reunited from time to time. They performed at the Classic Metal Fest in Ohio, 2002, and had a headlining spot at the Headbangers Open Air in Germany. They also played the Keep It True festival in Germany in 2007 and a reunion show in their home town of Nashville in November 2011, in honor of the 20th anniversary of Psycho Savant.

In 2004, the band re-released their 1987 debut album Live to Die through Hellion Records with six bonus tracks.

They are presently in the studio working on a 'Best Of' CD which will consist of eight fan-picked tracks from the two Metal Blade Records releases, A Higher Form of Killing and Psycho Savant. It will also contain a brand new track as well. This release sees the return of Todd Nelson on bass. This will be the first time the original Metal Blade lineup will have recorded together since 1991.

2017 was the 30th anniversary of the band.

After a few years on hiatus, Intruder announced a reunion on their Facebook page on October 16, 2019, and that they were planning to play some shows in 2020, including that year's Headbangers Open Air.

Longtime rhythm guitarist Greg Messick died unexpectedly on September 5, 2020, at the age of 55; his death was announced by the band that same day.

== Members ==
Current members

- Jimmy Hamilton – vocals
- Arthur Vinett – guitar
- Todd Nelson – bass
- John Pieroni – drums

Former members

- Greg Messick – guitar (died 2020)
- Garry Todd
- Chris Veach

== Discography ==
Studio albums

- Live to Die (1987)
- A Higher Form of Killing (1989)
- Psycho Savant (1991)
- Live to Die – Relived (2004)

EP's

- Escape from Pain (1990)
