= Cry Wolf (band) =

American band

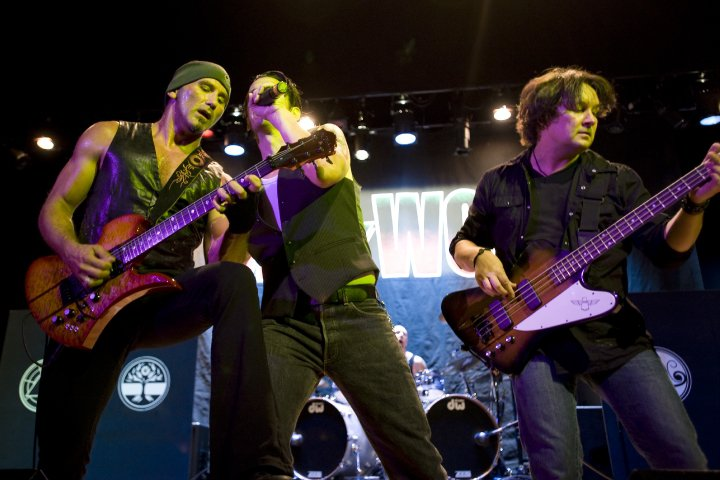
- Live in 2010

Background information
- Origin: San Francisco Bay Area, United States
- Genre: Hair metal
- Years active: 1985–1994, 2007-Present
- Labels: Epic/Sony Japan, Grand Slamm/I.R.S. Records
- Members: Tim Hall; Steve McKnight; Phil Deckard; Paul Cancilla
- Past members: Dyna Shirasaki; Susie Major; Chris Moore; James Gilmore; John E. Link; JC Crampton; John Freixas
- Website: Official website

Cry Wolf is a hair metal band formed in the San Francisco Bay Area in the mid-1980s. Originally named Heroes, the original band consisted of Tim Hall (vocals), Steve McKnight (guitar), Phil Deckard (bass), John Freixas (drums) and JC Crampton (keyboards).

== Band members ==
=== Current members ===
- Tim Hall – lead vocals
- Steve McKnight – guitar, vocals
- Phil Deckard – bass guitar, vocals
- Paul Cancilla – drums

=== Former members ===
- Dyna Shirasaki – lead vocals
- Susie Major – lead vocals
- Chris Moore – drums, percussion
- James Gilmore – drums, percussion
- John E. Link - drums, percussion
- JC Crampton - keyboards
- John Freixas - drums, percussion (1985–1986)

== Discography ==
Studio albums

- Cry Wolf (1989)
- Crunch (1990)
- Twenty Ten (2010)

== See also ==
- List of glam metal bands and artists
