= Winter (metal band) =

American death/doom metal band

- Origin: New York City, U.S.
- Genre: Death-doom
- Years active: 1988–1992, 2010–2015
- Labels: Metal Mind, Nuclear Blast
- Members: Stephen Flam; Joe Goncalves; John Alman

Winter was an American death/doom band from New York City. They take their name from the Amebix song of the same name. The band performed at the 2011 Roadburn Festival in the Netherlands.

== Members ==
Line-up

- John Alman - vocals, bass
- Stephen Flam - guitars (later of Thorn)
- Scott Lewis - drums (on 1989 demo Hour Of Doom )
- Joe Goncalves - drums (on Into Darkness)
- Jimmy Jackson - drums (on Live In Brooklyn 09/02/2012)
- Anthony "Tony" Pinnisi - keyboards

== Discography ==
Studio albums

- Into Darkness (1990)

EPs

- Eternal Frost (1994)

Live albums

- Live in Brooklyn NY (2024)

Demos

- Hour of Doom demo tape (1989)

The album was re-released in 1992 by Nuclear Blast, and again in 1999 (including the EP material). The EP contained the songs from the demo and a bonus track.

Metal Mind Records announced in February 2008, that they would be re-releasing both the Into Darkness album, and Eternal Frost EP, as a limited edition digipak on May 13 that year. Metal Mind Records purports to have obtained a license from Nuclear Blast to re-issue this limited edition digipak.

Southern Lord reissued Into Darkness on vinyl in 2011 along with a 30-page booklet with fliers, photos, and more.

On July 8, 2013, The Village Voice blogger Jason Roche listed Into Darkness as No. 14 in the Top 20 Hardcore and Metal Albums to come out of New York City.
