= Cyclone Temple =

American thrash metal band

Background information
- Origin: Chicago, Illinois, U.S.
- Genre: Thrash metal
- Years active: 1989–1994
- Labels: Relativity Records (Combat Records); Polydisc/Progressive International; Monsterdisc
- Past members: Brian Troch; Sonny DeLuca; Greg Fulton; Scott Schafer; John Slattery; Marco Salinas

Cyclone Temple was an American thrash metal band from Chicago, Illinois, formed from the remnants of Znöwhite. The two key members responsible for producing Znöwhite's Act of God Scott Schafer and Ian Tafoya – now using his given name Greg Fulton – found lead vocalist Brian Troch and formed Cyclone Temple and released I Hate Therefore I Am. The band never received commercial attention, due to the grunge explosion of the 1990s.

== History ==
Cyclone Temple started life as Znöwhite. After vocalist Debbie Gunn left Znowhite for unspecified health reasons the three remaining members of Znowhite (Greg Fulton, Scott Schafer, and John Slattery) recruited singer Brian Troch (formerly of the local Chicago band Hammeron). They performed for a brief period of time as Znowhite, but after signing with Combat Records they decided to change the name of the band to Cyclone Temple. Cyclone Temple's first album I Hate Therefore I Am was released in 1991. Soon after, Combat Records's parent company Relativity Records was bought out by Sony BMG. Sony shut down Combat Records soon after buying Relativity. Troch walked away from the group after the tour for I Hate Therefore I Am as stated in an interview for re-release through Dive Bomb Records in 2017. He was replaced for Cyclone Temple's 1993 release Building Errors in the Machine EP by Marco Salinas (a.k.a. Marcos Jacob of the Mexican rock band Cohetica). In 1994, with a third new singer, Sonny DeLuca, Cyclone Temple released their last recording, My Friend Lonely. That release featured the re-recorded old tracks from the out-of-print/hard to find Building Errors In The Machine EP and new tracks. Both recordings met with limited success in the United States, but did well overseas. More current reviews of both full-length CDs reveal that Cyclone Temple's style may have been too far ahead of its time, combining elements of thrash, groove and reggae. I Hate Therefore I Am is still considered by many metal fans to be one of the last, great, pre-grunge, thrash metal recordings.

Guitarist Greg Fulton and bassist Scott Schafer went on to form Rebels Without Applause. Sonny DeLuca went on to work briefly with SOiL and was a founding member of Arista recording artists From Zero but stepped aside, reportedly due to musical differences. Brian Troch worked on Shooting Hemlock, The Reign of Terror, My Infected Soul, Elliott Waits For No One and EWFNO / CMurder Collaboration "Mama's Bad Boy". Troch also went on to play Anas in Jesus Christ Superstar in New York.

== Discography ==
- I Hate Therefore I Am (1991)
- Building Errors in the Machine (1993) (EP)
- My Friend Lonely (1994)
