= Grinder (band) =

German speed/thrash metal band

Promotional photo of the band

Grinder was a late 1980s/early 1990s speed metal/thrash metal band from Germany. They released three full-length albums and one EP before disbanding. Grinder was the first international heavy metal act to play in Turkey, on May 12, 1990, at the Open Air Theater in Istanbul.

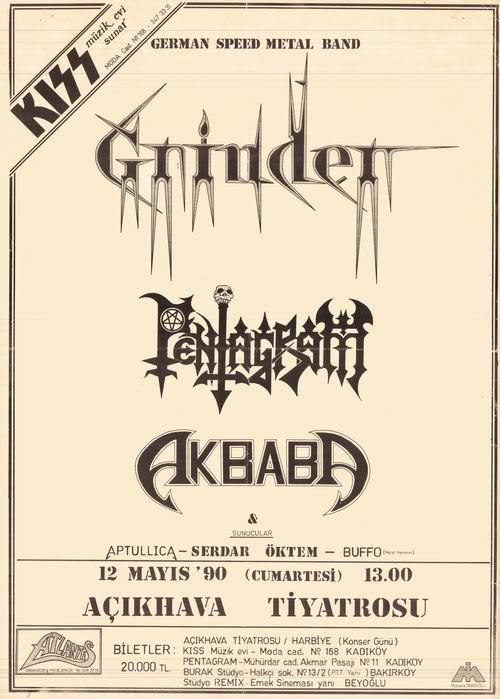
Poster advertising the band's gig in Istanbul in 1990

== Members ==
- Adrian Hahn – vocals (plus bass guitar on first three albums)
- Andy Ergün – guitars
- Lario Teklic – guitars
- Andi Reichert – bass
- Stefan Arnold – drums (played in Grave Digger afterwards)

== Discography ==
- Dawn for the Living (1988)
- Dead End (1989)
- Nothing is Sacred (1991)
