= 1987 in heavy metal music =

This is a timeline documenting the events of heavy metal music in the year 1987.

== Newly formed bands ==
- Addictive
- Alastis
- Alchemist
- Alice in Chains
- Asphyx
- Assück
- Autopsy
- Backyard Babies
- Bad English
- Biohazard
- Blue Murder
- BulletBoys
- Cynic
- Danger Danger
- Dangerous Toys
- Danzig
- Dead Horse
- Defecation
- Deicide
- Devil Doll
- Disharmonic Orchestra
- Electric Boys
- Entombed
- Epidemic
- Equinox
- Every Mother's Nightmare
- Extremoduro
- Femme Fatale
- Fleshcrawl
- Follow for Now
- Gargoyle
- Giant
- Gorky Park
- Gun
- Hamlet
- Harem Scarem
- Hermética
- Heaven's Edge
- Hobbs' Angel of Death
- House of Lords
- Impellitteri
- Impetigo
- Internal Void
- Intruder
- Ira
- Jailhouse
- Junkyard
- Kamelot
- Kingdom Come
- Kyuss
- Lawnmower Deth
- Lion's Share
- Little Caesar
- Malevolent Creation
- Master's Hammer
- Meliah Rage
- Meshuggah
- Monumentum
- Mortification
- Nasty Idols
- Ningen Isu
- Nirvana
- Nocturnus
- Obliveon
- Order from Chaos
- Pariah
- Pavor
- Phantom Blue
- Pink Cream 69
- Porcupine Tree
- Pretty Boy Floyd
- Primordial
- Re-Animator
- Ripping Corpse
- Rollins Band
- Root
- Rotting Christ
- Roxus
- Samael
- Sanatorium
- Saraya
- Secrecy
- Seventh Angel
- Shout
- Sleeze Beez
- Solitude Aeturnus
- Spiritus Mortis
- Sweaty Nipples
- Terrorvision
- Therion
- Tiamat
- Transmetal
- Tyketto
- U.D.O.
- Ugly Kid Joe
- Uncle Slam
- Valhall
- Vengeance Rising
- Veni Domine
- Von
- Warrior Soul
- Winger
- Zeni Geva

== Albums & EPs ==
- Aerosmith - Permanent Vacation
- Agent Steel - Unstoppable Force
- Alice Cooper - Raise Your Fist and Yell
- The Angels, aka Angel City – Live Line (live)
- Anthem - Bound to Break
- Anthrax - Among the Living
- Anthrax - I'm the Man (EP)
- Anvil - Strength of Steel
- Aria - Герой Асфальта (Hero of Asphalt)
- Armored Saint - Raising Fear
- Artillery - Fear of Tomorrow
- Atomkraft – Conductors of Noize (EP)
- Attomica - Attomica
- Autograph - Loud and Clear
- Barón Rojo - Tierra de Nadie
- Bathory - Under the Sign of the Black Mark
- Billy Idol – Vital Idol
- Bitch - The Bitch Is Back
- Black Sabbath - The Eternal Idol
- Blood Feast - Face Fate (EP)
- Blood Feast - Kill for Pleasure
- Bloodgood - Detonation
- Bonfire - Fireworks
- Burning Starr - Blaze of Glory
- Cacophony - Speed Metal Symphony
- Candlemass - Nightfall
- Carnivore - Retaliation
- Celtic Frost - Into the Pandemonium
- Paul Chain Violet Theatre - Opera 4th
- Chastain - The 7th of Never
- Chrome Molly - Stick It Out
- Coroner - R.I.P.
- The Cult - Electric
- Dead Brain Cells - Dead Brain Cells
- D.R.I. - Crossover
- Dirty Looks – I Want More
- Death - Scream Bloody Gore
- Death Angel - The Ultra-Violence
- Def Leppard - Hysteria
- Destruction - Mad Butcher (EP)
- Paul Di'Anno's Battlezone – Children of Madness
- Dio - Dream Evil
- Dokken - Back for the Attack
- Earthshaker - Aftershock
- Excel - Split Image
- Exodus - Pleasures of the Flesh
- EZO - EZO
- Faith No More - Introduce Yourself
- Faster Pussycat - Faster Pussycat
- Frehley's Comet - Frehley's Comet
- Great White - Once Bitten
- Grim Reaper - Rock You to Hell
- Guns N' Roses - Appetite for Destruction
- Hades - Resisting Success
- Heathen - Breaking the Silence
- Helix - Wild in the Streets
- Hellion - Screams in the Night
- Helloween - Keeper of the Seven Keys: Part I
- Holy Moses - Finished with the Dogs
- Icon – A More Perfect Union
- Impellitteri – Impellitteri (EP)
- Infernäl Mäjesty – None Shall Defy
- Intruder - Live to Die
- Jesters of Destiny - In a Nostalgic Mood (EP)
- Judas Priest - Priest...Live!
- Kane Roberts - Kane Roberts
- Keel - Keel
- King Diamond - Abigail
- Kiss - Crazy Nights
- Kreator - Terrible Certainty
- Lȧȧz Rockit - Know Your Enemy
- Leatherwolf - Leatherwolf
- Liege Lord - Burn to My Touch
- Lion - Dangerous Attraction
- Lizzy Borden - Terror Rising (EP)
- Lizzy Borden - Visual Lies
- Loudness - Hurricane Eyes
- Tony MacAlpine - Maximum Security
- Mad Max - Night of Passion
- Malibu Barbi - Rude Girls (EP)
- Malice - License to kill
- Mama's Boys – Growing Up the Hard Way
- Mammoth - Mammoth
- Manilla Road - Mystification
- Manowar - Fighting the World
- Masi - Fire in the Rain
- Mayhem - Deathcrush (EP)
- McAuley Schenker Group - Perfect Timing
- Metal Massacre - Metal Massacre VIII (Compilation, various artists)
- Metallica - The $5.98 E.P. - Garage Days Re-Revisited (EP)
- Montrose – Mean
- Vinnie Moore - Mind's Eye
- Mötley Crüe - Girls, Girls, Girls
- Motörhead - Rock 'n' Roll
- Napalm Death - Scum
- Nasty Savage - Indulgence
- Necrophagia – Season of the Dead
- Neurosis – Pain of Mind
- John Norum - Total Control
- Obsession - Methods of Madness
- Odin – The Gods Must Be Crazy
- Omen - Nightmares (EP)
- Ozzy Osbourne - Tribute (live)
- Ostrogoth - Feelings of Fury
- Overkill - Taking Over
- Paganini - It's a Long Way to the Top
- Paradox - Product of Imagination
- Pentagram - Day of Reckoning
- Phenomena – Phenomena II: Dream Runner
- Picture – Marathon
- Possessed - The Eyes of Horror (EP)
- Post Mortem – The Missing Link (EP)
- Pretty Maids - Future World
- Primal Scream – Volume One
- Prong - Primitive Origins (EP)
- Racer X - Second Heat
- Rage - Execution Guaranteed
- Raven - Life's a Bitch
- Rollins Band - Life Time
- Running Wild - Under Jolly Roger
- Rush - Hold Your Fire
- Sacred Child - Sacred Child
- Sacred Reich - Ignorance (album)
- Sacrifice - Forward to Termination
- Sacrilege – Within the Prophecy
- Saint Vitus - Thirsty and Miserable
- Sarcófago - I.N.R.I.
- Satan - Suspended Sentence
- Joe Satriani - Surfing with the Alien
- Savatage - Hall of the Mountain King
- Seikima-II - Big Time Changes
- Sepultura - Schizophrenia
- Shout - It Won't Be Long
- Sinner - Dangerous Charm
- Slaughter - Strappado
- Sodom - Persecution Mania
- Suicidal Tendencies - Join the Army
- Joey Tafolla - Out of the Sun
- Tankard - Chemical Invasion
- Taramis - Queen of Thieves
- Tarantula - Tarantula
- Testament - The Legacy
- Tigertailz - Young and Crazy
- TNT – Tell No Tales
- Tormé – Die Pretty, Die Young
- Transmetal - Velocidad, Desecho Y Metal (demo)
- Triumph – Surveillance
- Trouble - Run to the Light
- Twisted Sister - Love Is for Suckers
- Tygers of Pan Tang - Burning in the Shade
- U.D.O. - Animal House
- Unseen Terror - Human Error
- Vanadium – Corruption of Innocence
- Vengeance (Hol) - Take It or Leave It
- Venom - Calm Before the Storm
- Victory - Hungry Hearts
- Viper - Soldiers of Sunrise
- Voivod - Killing Technology
- Vow Wow - V
- VXN - VXN (EP)
- Warlock - Triumph and Agony
- W.A.S.P. - Live... in the Raw
- Whiplash - Ticket to Mayhem
- White Lion - Pride
- Whitesnake - Whitesnake
- Wild Dogs - Reign of Terror
- Wrath - Nothing to Fear
- Würzel – Bess (EP)
- Xyster - Escuadrón Metálico (Proyecto II) (split)
- Y&T - Contagious
- Zodiac Mindwarp - Tattooed Beat Messiah

== Disbandments ==
- Alcatrazz (reformed in 2006)
- Sound Barrier (reformed in 2017)
- Twisted Sister (reformed in 2003)

== Events ==
- Udo Dirkschneider departs Accept citing management issues, and later the same year forms U.D.O.
- Bon Jovi headlines the Monsters of Rock festival with Dio, Metallica, Anthrax, W.A.S.P. and Cinderella. Dee Snider, Bruce Dickinson and Paul Stanley join Bon Jovi to perform "We're an American Band" by Grand Funk.
- Motörhead's drummer Pete Gill leaves the band and Phil "Philthy Animal" Taylor returns.
- Mötley Crüe - Girls, Girls, Girls peaked at No. 2 in the Billboard charts.
- The show Headbangers Ball debuts on MTV on April 18, 1987.
- Bon Jovi's album Slippery When Wet tops the Billboard charts for eight weeks.
- In December 1987, Mötley Crüe bassist Nikki Sixx suffers a near-fatal heroin overdose.
- Bassist Louiche Mayorga leaves Suicidal Tendencies and is replaced by Bob Heathcote. At the same time, the band becomes a five-piece as they hire former No Mercy guitarist Mike Clark as their rhythm guitarist.

Preceded by 1986	Heavy Metal Timeline; 1987	Succeeded by 1988
