= List of Paradox (German band) members =

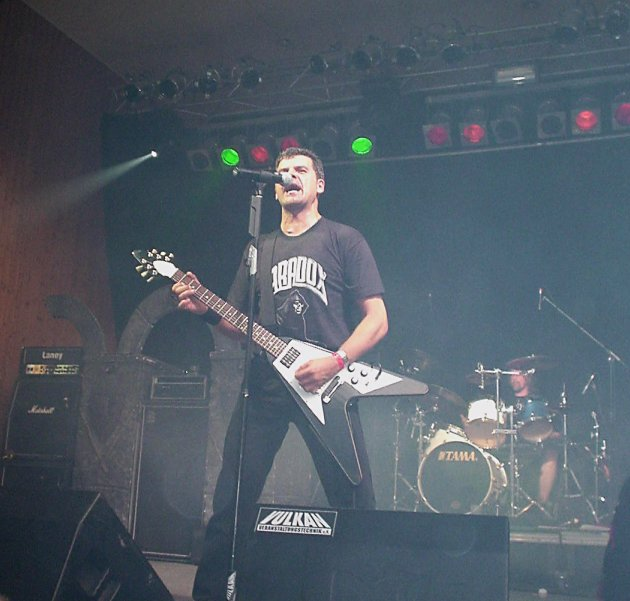
Paradox frontman and sole constant member Charly Steinhauer performing live in 2006.

Paradox is a German thrash metal band from Würzburg. Formed in February 1986, the group originally consisted of vocalist and rhythm guitarist Charly Steinhauer, lead guitarist Jochen Glöggler, bassist Roland Stahl, and drummer Axel Blaha. Since January 2024, Steinhauer has been the sole member of the group, performing all vocals and instruments on their latest release.

== History ==
=== 1986–1991 ===
Paradox was formed on 19 February 1986 by vocalist and guitarist Charly Steinhauer and drummer Axel Blaha, who had earlier performed together in a band called Warhead. The band's initial lineup was completed by guitarist Jochen Glöggler and bassist Roland Stahl. After recording a debut demo, Glöggler left the band in July due to "time constraints", with Markus Spyth taking his place the following month. Spyth debuted on the band's second demo Mystery in 1987 and later performed on their full-length debut Product of Imagination. In October 1988, Stahl was forced to leave the band after joining the army, with Armin Donderer briefly filling in for a string of live shows. Before the end of the month, Matthias Schmitt joined as Stahl's official replacement.

The new lineup started recording for the second Paradox album in January 1989, but Spyth left the band the next month. He was replaced by Dieter Roth, with whom the band finished recording Heresy in the summer ahead of its November 1989 release. After the recording of Heresy, bassist Schmitt and session guitarist Roth left the band, with their places taken by Donderer and Kai Pasemann, respectively. At the same time, Stefan Haller took over vocal duties from Steinhauer, who had injured his voice during early sessions for Heresy. During the summer of 1990, the band recorded several tracks which would remain unreleased until 2023, featuring new bassist Joe DiBiase. After a short tenure with Klaus Lohmeyer on bass, Paradox disbanded in July 1991.

=== 1998–2010 ===
In late 1998, Charly Steinhauer announced that he had reformed Paradox and written a new album, with Udo Klein hired as the band's new drummer. He later revealed that original members Markus Spyth and Roland Stahl were also part of the reformation, but had to pull out early on due to time challenges. By early 1999, the frontman had assembled a new lineup of the group which included returning guitarist Kai Passeman, plus brothers Oliver and Alex Holzwarth on bass and drums, respectively. The new lineup released Collision Course in 2000.

In May 2002, Paradox announced that they were looking for two new members, after Steinhauer was forced to stop singing due to a vocal cord injury, and Pasemann had left to focus on another job. By December that year, Pasemann had returned to the band, while the Holzwarth brothers had been replaced by returning bassist Armin Donderer and new drummer Stefan Schwarzmann, who had played with Pasemann in the band Cronos Titan several years previously. Despite having left the band, it was reported in October 2003 that the next Paradox album would feature the Holzwarth brothers, with recording scheduled to start in early 2004. By that summer, however, the band had been placed on temporary hiatus as Steinhauer was recovering from a "serious sickness".

By the time Paradox returned in November 2005, the lineup had changed to include Fabian Schwartz on second lead guitar, Andi Siegl on bass and Chris Weiss on drums. By December 2006, all three additions had left again. After a short period as a duo, Steinhauer and Pasemann were joined in April 2007 by new bassist Olly Keller and drummer Roland Jahoda. The new lineup released the band's fourth album Electrify in January 2008. This was followed by a second album by the same lineup, the band's fifth overall, Riot Squad, in October 2009.

=== 2010–2023 ===
At the beginning of January 2010, Kai Pasemann and Roland Jahoda left Paradox. Pasemann was replaced by Gus Drax, while Jahoda returned just a couple of weeks later. The band had cancelled all future live shows by July that year, and a year later announced the return of the Holzwarth brothers, Oliver (bass) and Alex (drums). Drax left for "personal reasons" in December 2011. In May 2012, Steinhauer unveiled another new incarnation of Paradox including returning bassist Olly Keller and new members Christian Münzner on lead guitar and Daniel "Evil Ewald" Buld on drums. The new lineup recorded the band's sixth album Tales of the Weird, which was released in December 2012. Keller was replaced by Tommy Kittsteiner Calvanese in November 2013.

In June 2014, Steinhauer announced that he had parted ways with the rest of the band due to a "break down" in communication. The group was rebuilt over the next few months, as Gus Drax rejoined on lead guitar in November, Kostas Milonas took over on drums in January 2015, and finally Tilen Hudrap joined on bass that March. The new lineup released Pangea in June 2016. Former band members Markus Spyth, Roland Stahl and Axel Blaha all performed backing vocals on the album, before returning to the band for a Product of Imagination anniversary tour in 2017. The reunion lasted until June 2020, when Spyth and Stahl were replaced by returning members Christian Münzner and Olly Keller. The group released Heresy II: End of a Legend in 2021.

=== Since 2023 ===
On 12 September 2023, Axel Blaha died at the age of 59. In January 2024, Steinhauer announced that he was recording all instruments and vocals for the next Paradox album on his own, explaining that "I will never again work with project-hungry musician whores who play a few notes on an album but otherwise have nothing to do with Paradox". The album, Mysterium, was dedicated to Blaha and released in September 2025.

== Members ==
=== Current ===
Name	Years active	Instruments	Release contributions
Charly Steinhauer	1986–1991; 1998–present	lead vocals; guitars (lead since 2024); bass (since 2024); drums (since 2024)	all Paradox releases

=== Former ===
Name	Years active	Instruments	Release contributions
Axel Blaha (1965–2023)	1986–1991; 2016–2023	drums	untitled debut demo (1986); Mystery demo (1987); Product of Imagination (1987); Heresy (1989); Pangea (2016); Heresy II: End of a Legend (2021); The Demo Collection, Vol. 2: 1988–1990 (2023)
Roland Stahl	1986–1988; 1998–1999; 2016–2020	bass	untitled debut demo (1986); Mystery demo (1987); Product of Imagination (1987); Pangea (2016); The Demo Collection, Vol. 2: 1988–1990 (2023)
Jochen Glöggler	1986	lead guitar	untitled debut demo (1986)
Markus Spyth	1986–1989; 1998–1999; 2016–2020	lead guitar	Mystery demo (1987); Product of Imagination (1987); Pangea (2016); The Demo Collection, Vol. 2: 1988–1990 (2023)
Armin Donderer	1988 (stand-in); 1989–1990; 2002–2005	bass	none
Matthias Schmitt	1988–1989	bass; backing vocals	Heresy (1989); The Demo Collection, Vol. 2: 1988–1990 (2023)
Dieter Roth	1989 (session)	lead guitar	Heresy (1989)
Kai Pasemann	1989–1991; 1999–2002; 2002–2010	lead guitar; backing vocals	Collision Course (2000); Electrify (2008); Riot Squad (2009); The Demo Collection, Vol. 2: 1988–1990 (2023)
Stefan Haller	1989–1990	lead vocals	The Demo Collection, Vol. 2: 1988–1990 (2023)
Joe DiBiase	1990–1991	bass	The Demo Collection, Vol. 2: 1988–1990 (2023)
Klaus Lohmeyer	1991	bass	none
Udo Klein	1998–1999	drums	none
Oliver Holzwarth	1999–2002; 2011–2012	bass	Collision Course (2000)
Alex Holzwarth	1999–2002; 2011–2012	drums	Collision Course (2000)
Stefan Schwarzmann	2002–2005	drums; backing vocals	none
Fabian Schwarz	2005–2006	lead and rhythm guitars	none
Andi Siegl	2005–2006	bass	none
Chris Weiss	2005–2006	drums	none
Olly Keller	2007–2011; 2012–2013; 2020–2024	bass	Electrify (2008); Riot Squad (2009); Tales of the Weird (2012); Heresy II: End of a Legend (2021)
Roland Jahoda	2007–2010; 2010–2011	drums	Electrify (2008); Riot Squad (2009)
Gus Drax	2010–2011; 2014–2016	lead guitar	Tales of the Weird (2012); Pangea (2016)
Christian Münzner	2012–2014; 2020–2024	lead guitar	Tales of the Weird (2012); Heresy II: End of a Legend (2021)
Daniel "Evil Ewald" Buld	2012–2014	drums	Tales of the Weird (2012)
Tommy Kittsteiner Calvanese	2013–2014	bass	none
Kostas Milonas	2015–2016	drums	Pangea (2016)
Tilen Hudrap	2015–2016	bass	Pangea (2016)

== Lineups ==
Period	Members	Releases
February–July 1986	Charly Steinhauer — vocals, rhythm guitar; Jochen Glöggler — lead guitar; Roland Stahl — bass; Axel Blaha — drums	untitled debut demo (1986)
August 1986–October 1988	Charly Steinhauer — vocals, rhythm guitar; Markus Spyth — lead guitar; Roland Stahl — bass; Axel Blaha — drums	Mystery demo (1987); Product of Imagination (1987); The Demo Collection, Vol. 2: 1988–1990 (2023) — four 1988 tracks
October 1988	Charly Steinhauer — vocals, rhythm guitar; Markus Spyth — lead guitar; Armin Donderer — bass (stand-in); Axel Blaha — drums	none
October 1988–February 1989	Charly Steinhauer — lead vocals, rhythm guitar; Markus Spyth — lead guitar; Matthias Schmitt — bass, backing vocals; Axel Blaha — drums	The Demo Collection, Vol. 2: 1988–1990 (2023) — four 1988 tracks
Early–summer 1989	Charly Steinhauer — lead vocals, rhythm guitar; Dieter Roth — lead guitar; Matthias Schmitt — bass, backing vocals; Axel Blaha — drums	Heresy (1989)
Fall 1989–1990	Stefan Haller — lead vocals; Kai Pasemann — lead guitar, backing vocals; Charly Steinhauer — rhythm guitar; Armin Donderer — bass; Axel Blaha — drums	none
1990	Stefan Haller — lead vocals; Kai Pasemann — lead guitar, backing vocals; Charly Steinhauer — rhythm guitar; Joe DiBiase — bass; Axel Blaha — drums	The Demo Collection, Vol. 2: 1988–1990 (2023) — all ten 1990 tracks
1990–1991	Charly Steinhauer — lead vocals, rhythm guitar; Kai Pasemann — lead guitar, backing vocals; Joe DiBiase — bass; Axel Blaha — drums	none
1991 (until July)	Charly Steinhauer — lead vocals, rhythm guitar; Kai Pasemann — lead guitar, backing vocals; Klaus Lohmeyer — bass; Axel Blaha — drums	none
Band inactive 1992–1997
Late 1998–early 1999	Charly Steinhauer — vocals, rhythm guitar; Markus Spyth — lead guitar; Roland Stahl — bass; Udo Klein — drums	none
Early 1999–May 2002	Charly Steinhauer — lead vocals, rhythm guitar; Kai Pasemann — lead guitar, backing vocals; Oliver Holzwarth — bass; Alex Holzwarth — drums	Collision Course (2000)
May–December 2002	Charly Steinhauer — vocals, guitars; Oliver Holzwarth — bass; Alex Holzwarth — drums	none
December 2002–November 2005	Charly Steinhauer — lead vocals, rhythm guitar; Kai Pasemann — lead guitar, backing vocals; Armin Donderer — bass; Stefan Schwarzmann — drums, backing vocals	none
November 2005–December 2006	Charly Steinhauer — lead vocals, rhythm guitar; Kai Pasemann — lead guitar, backing vocals; Fabian Schwarz — lead and rhythm guitars; Andi Siegl — bass; Chris Weiss — drums	none
December 2006–April 2007	Charly Steinhauer — lead vocals, rhythm guitar; Kai Pasemann — lead guitar, backing vocals	none
April 2007–January 2010	Charly Steinhauer — lead vocals, rhythm guitar; Kai Pasemann — lead guitar, backing vocals; Olly Keller — bass; Roland Jahoda — drums	Electrify (2008); Riot Squad (2009)
January 2010–June 2011	Charly Steinhauer — vocals, rhythm guitar; Gus Drax — lead guitar; Olly Keller — bass; Roland Jahoda — drums	none
June–December 2011	Charly Steinhauer — vocals, rhythm guitar; Gus Drax — lead guitar; Oliver Holzwarth — bass; Alex Holzwarth — drums	none
May 2012–November 2013	Charly Steinhauer — vocals, rhythm guitar; Christian Münzner — lead guitar; Olly Keller — bass; Daniel Buld — drums	Tales of the Weird (2012)
November 2013–June 2014	Charly Steinhauer — vocals, rhythm guitar; Christian Münzner — lead guitar; Tommy Kittsteiner Calvanese — bass; Daniel Buld — drums	none
November 2014–January 2015	Charly Steinhauer — vocals, rhythm guitar; Gus Drax — lead guitar	Pangea (2016)
January–March 2015	Charly Steinhauer — vocals, rhythm guitar; Gus Drax — lead guitar; Kostas Milonas — drums	Pangea (2016)
March 2015–December 2016	Charly Steinhauer — vocals, rhythm guitar; Gus Drax — lead guitar; Tilen Hudrap — bass; Kostas Milonas — drums	Pangea (2016)
December 2016–June 2020	Charly Steinhauer — vocals, rhythm guitar; Markus Spyth — lead guitar; Roland Stahl — bass; Axel Blaha — drums	none
June 2020–September 2023	Charly Steinhauer — vocals, rhythm guitar; Christian Münzner — lead guitar; Olly Keller — bass; Axel Blaha — drums	Heresy II: End of a Legend (2021)
January 2024–present	Charly Steinhauer — vocals, guitars, bass, drums	Mysterium (2025)
