= Decameron (disambiguation) =

The Decameron is a 14th-century writing by Italian author Giovanni Boccaccio, circa 1353.

Decameron may also refer to:

- The Decameron (film), a 1971 Italian film by Pier Paolo Pasolini
- The Decameron (TV series), a 2024 American series created by Kathleen Jordan
- Decameron (band), a British folk / progressive rock band
- Decameron (album), a 1992 album by Epidemic
