= Left for Dead =

Left for Dead may refer to:

== Film and television ==
- "Left for Dead", a 2004 episode of the American television drama series NCIS
- Left for Dead (2005 film), a British martial arts film
- Left for Dead (2007 horror film), a 2007 Canadian horror film
- Left for Dead (2007 Western film), a 2007 American-Argentine horror western film
- Ed Stafford: Left For Dead, a 2017 television series hosted by English explorer Ed Stafford
- Left for Dead: The Ashley Reeves Story, a 2021 biographical film
- Wrong Turn 3: Left for Dead, a 2009 horror film

== Games ==
- Left 4 Dead (franchise), a video game franchise developed by Valve Corporation
  - Left 4 Dead, a 2008 video game
  - Left 4 Dead 2, the sequel released in 2009
- Shadow Company: Left for Dead, a 1999 video game

== Music ==
- Left for Dead (Crazy Horse album), 1989
- Left for Dead (Lustra album), 2006
- Left for Dead (Wussy album), 2007
- Left for Dead (Lȧȧz Rockit album), 2008
- Left for Dead (EP), released in 2003 by Shootin' Goon
- "Left for Dead", a song by Tribe of Judah from the 2002 album Exit Elvis
- "Left for Dead", a song by Death Angel from the 2013 album The Dream Calls for Blood
- "Left Me For Dead", a song by Rob Dougan from the 2002 album Furious Angels

== Books ==
- Left For Dead, a 2000 book by mountain climber Beck Weathers
- Left for Dead, a 2007 book by sailor Nick Ward about the 1979 Fastnet race
