= No Stranger to Danger =

No Stranger to Danger may refer to:

- No Stranger to Danger (Payolas album) (1982)
- No Stranger to Danger (Lȧȧz Rockit album) (1985)
