= Power and Pain =

Studio album by Whiplash
- Released: February 1986
- Recorded: Systems II, Brooklyn, New York
- Genre: Thrash metal
- Length: 34:45
- Label: Roadrunner
- Producer: Norman Dunn

Whiplash chronology
Power and Pain (1986)	Ticket to Mayhem (1987)

Professional ratings
Review scores
Source	Rating
AllMusic	4.5/5 stars

Power and Pain is the debut album by American thrash metal band Whiplash. It was released in 1986 via Roadrunner Records and was followed up by 1987's Ticket to Mayhem.

In 1998, Displeased Records rereleased Power and Pain, which included their second album, Ticket to Mayhem.

The album features members of New York City bands, Carnivore and Agnostic Front, on backing vocals.

Metal Hammer included the album cover on their list of "50 most hilariously ugly rock and metal album covers ever".

== Artwork ==
Simon Young of Metal Hammer said of the album's cover artwork: "The brief? A robot from the future visits the UK to punish Ross Kemp. No specific reason."

== Critical reception ==
Chris True of AllMusic gave the album four and a half stars out of five, saying: "Fans of early underground thrash metal will be glad to see this stuff reissued."

== Track listing ==
- All songs written by Tony Portaro. except where noted.

No.	Title	Length
1.	"Stage Dive"	3:09
2.	"Red Bomb"	5:18
3.	"Last Man Alive"	3:31
4.	"Message in Blood"	4:04
5.	"War Monger"	3:18
6.	"Power Thrashing Death"	4:13
7.	"Stirring the Cauldron (lyrics and music by Tony Portaro, Tony Scaglione and Tony Bono)"	4:18
8.	"Spit on Your Grave"	2:49
9.	"Nailed to the Cross"	4:05
Total length:		34:45

== Credits ==
- Tony Portaro – vocals, guitar
- Tony Bono – bass
- Tony Scaglione – drums
- Peter Steele and Louie Beateaux (Carnivore) – backing vocals
- Vinnie Stigma and Rob Kabula (Agnostic Front) – backing vocals
- Recorded at Systems II, Brooklyn, New York
- Produced by Norman Dunn
- Engineered by Michael Marciano
