= Thrashback =

Studio album by Whiplash
- Released: October 3, 1998
- Genre: Thrash metal
- Length: 41:52
- Label: Massacre Records

Whiplash chronology
| Sit Stand Kneel Prey (1997) | Thrashback (1998) | Unborn Again (2009) |

Professional ratings
Review scores
| Source | Rating |
|---|---|
| Rock Brigade | 9/10 |
| Rock Hard | 8/10 stars |

Thrashback is the sixth studio album by American thrash metal band Whiplash. It was released via Massacre Records and follows the previous year's offering, Sit Stand Kneel Prey.

The album marked a return to the three-piece line-up which recorded the band's first two albums between 1985 and 1987 – famously all called Tony. In 1999, Massacre Records released a compilation of previously unavailable demo and live tracks, entitled Messages in Blood, before the untimely death of Tony Bono.

Loudwire named Thrashback the best thrash metal album of 1998.

== Track listing ==
| No. | Title | Length |
|---|---|---|
| 1. | "Temple of Punishment" | 3:49 |
| 2. | "Stab" | 2:43 |
| 3. | "This" | 4:13 |
| 4. | "Killing on Monroe Street" | 3:56 |
| 5. | "King with the Axe" | 5:44 |
| 6. | "Strike Me Blind" | 2:26 |
| 7. | "Memory Serves" | 4:24 |
| 8. | "Resurrection Chair" | 3:11 |
| 9. | "House with No Doors" | 4:43 |
| 10. | "Thrash 'til Death" | 2:36 |
| 11. | "Nails in Me Deep" | 4:07 |

== Credits ==
- Tony Portaro – vocals, guitar
- Tony Bono – bass
- Tony Scaglione – drums
- Michael Pinnella – keyboards on track 6
- Michael Romeo – guitar solo on track 6
