= Annihilation Principle =

Studio album by Lȧȧz Rockit
- Released: February 8, 1989
- Recorded: August – September 1988
- Studio: Prairie Sun Recorders, Cotati, California, USA
- Genre: Thrash metal
- Label: Roadrunner/Enigma Records
- Producer: Roy M. Rowland

Lȧȧz Rockit chronology
Know Your Enemy (1987)	Annihilation Principle (1989)	Nothing's Sacred (1991)

Professional ratings
Review scores
Source	Rating
Allmusic	3/5 stars
Rock Hard	7.5/10 stars

Annihilation Principle is the fourth studio album by American thrash metal band Lȧȧz Rockit. It was released in 1989 on Roadrunner Records/Enigma Records. This is the final album featuring the classic line-up. A music video was filmed for "Fire in the Hole".

== Track listing ==
All songs written by Lȧȧz Rockit, unless otherwise stated.

Side A
No.	Title	Length
1.	"Fire in the Hole"	3:50
2.	"Mob Justice"	5:00
3.	"Chain of Fools"	4:16
4.	"Shadow Company"	6:19
5.	"Holiday in Cambodia" (Dead Kennedys cover)	3:46

Side B
No.	Title	Length
6.	"Bad Blood"	4:36
7.	"Chasin' Charlie"	4:41
8.	"Mirror to Madness"	5:09
9.	"The Omen"	6:38
Total length:		44:15

1989 Roadrunner bonus tracks
No.	Title	Length
1.	"Euroshima" (Live, from 1988 Dynamo Open Air)	4:25
2.	"Spared from Fire" (Live, from 1988 Dynamo Open Air)	6:07
Total length:		54:47

1990 Japanese bonus tracks
No.	Title	Length
1.	"Prelude to Death" (Live)	4:07
2.	"Forced to Fight" (Live)	4:54
Total length:		53:16

== Note ==
- The 2009 re-issue by Massacre Records contains a DVD of the band's live show at the Dynamo Open Air in Eindhoven on May 23, 1988
- Professional wrestler Sting appears in the "Fire in the Hole" music video

== Personnel ==
- Michael Coons – vocals
- Phil Kettner – guitars
- Aaron Jellum – guitars
- Willy Lange – bass
- Victor Agnello – drums

Production

- Dave Plastic – Photography
- Jeff "Ski" Sadowski – Album concept, Cover art
- John Harrell – Photography
- Mark DeVito – Layout (re-created)
- Marc Reyburn – Engineering (assistant)
- Dwayne Cavanas – Photography
- Wayne Marsala – Producer (DVD)
- George Horn – Mastering
- William Hames – Photography
- Jeff Weller – Executive producer, Album concept
- Neil Zlozower – Photography
- Jodi Summers – Photography
- Gene Ambo – Photography
- Andre Verhuysen – Executive producer (DVD)
- Eric de Haas – Photography
- Ace Cook – Producer (DVD)
- Dave Luke – Mixing (assistant)
- Alex Solca – Photography
- Roy Rowland – Producer, Engineering, Mixing
- Juan Urteaga – Remastering
- Jay Ginnini – Photography
- Steve Gross – Design
