= Nothing's Sacred (album) =

Studio album by Lȧȧz Rockit
- Released: November 27, 1991
- Recorded: 1991
- Studio: Fantasy Studios in Berkeley, California, USA
- Genre: Thrash metal
- Label: Roadrunner/Enigma Records
- Producer: Roy M. Rowland

Lȧȧz Rockit chronology
Annihilation Principle (1989)	Nothing's Sacred (1991)	Left for Dead (2008)

Professional ratings
Review scores
Source	Rating
Rock Hard	8.5/10 stars

Nothing's Sacred (stylized as NOTHING$ $ACRED on the album cover) is the fifth studio album by American thrash metal band Lȧȧz Rockit. It was released in 1991 on Roadrunner Records/Enigma Records. It is the only release to feature 3 different members. This was thought to be the last album until 2008's Left for Dead.

== Track listing ==
Side A
No.	Title	Length
1.	"In the Name of the Father and the Gun..."	4:14
2.	"Into the Asylum"	4:56
3.	"Greed Machine"	4:28
4.	"Too Far Gone"	3:45
5.	"Curiosity Kills"	3:18

Side B
No.	Title	Length
6.	"Suicide City"	4:26
7.	"The Enemy Within"	5:53
8.	"Nobody's Child"	3:43
9.	"Silence Is a Lie"	3:45
10.	"Necropolis" (Instrumental)	3:52
Total length:		42:20

2009 bonus tracks
No.	Title	Length
1.	"Ten Eyes"	3:57
2.	"Testimonial"	4:26
3.	"Plague"	5:02
Total length:		55:45

== Note ==
Despite the credits being as they are written here and in the liner notes, former Lȧȧz Rockit bassist Jon Torres stated in Snakepit magazine #9 and at least one other interview that he played bass and guitar on this album, and that Ken Savich also played guitar, were both uncredited, and that Scott Dominguez and Scott Sargeant don't play a single note on the release. This had yet to be verified

== Credits ==
- Michael Coons – lead vocals
- Aaron Jellum – guitars
- Scott Sargeant – guitars
- Scott Dominguez – bass
- Dave Chavarri – drums
- Paul Bostaph – drums on "Necropolis"

Production

- Mark DeVito – layout (re-created)
- Michael Rosen – producer, engineering, mixing
- Vincent Wojno – engineering (assistant)
- Jeff Weller – executive producer
- Tom Coyne – mastering
- Jeff "Ski" Sadowski – cover art, artwork
- Ace Cook – executive producer
- Juan Urteaga – remastering
- Neil Zlozower – photography
- William Hames – photography (Japan version)
