= Cult of One =

Studio album by Whiplash
- Released: June 5, 1996
- Genre: Groove metal
- Length: 62:19
- Label: Massacre Records

Whiplash chronology
Insult to Injury (1989)	Cult of One (1996)	Sit Stand Kneel Prey (1997)

Professional ratings
Review scores
Source	Rating
Rock Hard	9/10 stars

Cult of One is the fourth studio album by American thrash metal band Whiplash. It was released on Massacre Records in 1996 and follows a seven-year absence of the band after 1989's Insult to Injury. A different vocalist and bass player, and an additional guitarist joined originals Tony Portaro and Tony Scaglione – a line-up which again changed for the following year's offering, Sit Stand Kneel Prey.

== Track listing ==
No.	Title	Length
1.	"Such is the Will"	6:20
2.	"No One's Idol"	5:24
3.	"No Fear to Tread"	5:13
4.	"1,000 Times"	6:52
5.	"Wheel of Misfortune"	5:23
6.	"Heavenaut"	7:50
7.	"Lost World"	5:26
8.	"Cult of One"	8:28
9.	"Enemy"	4:32
10.	"Apostle of Truth"	6:51

== Credits ==
- Rob Gonzo – vocals
- Tony Portaro – guitar
- Warren Conditi – guitar
- James Preziosa – bass
- Tony Scaglione – drums
- Michael Pinnella – keyboards on tracks 7, 8, 10
