= Carnivore (Carnivore album) =

Studio album by Carnivore
- Released: November 1985
- Genres: Thrash metal, hardcore punk, doom metal
- Length: 43:15
- Label: Roadrunner
- Producers: Norman Dunn, Peter Steele

Carnivore chronology
Carnivore (1985)	Retaliation (1987)

Alternative cover
- Cover art for the 2001 reissue

Carnivore is the debut studio album by American crossover thrash band Carnivore. It was released in 1985 through Roadrunner Records.

The album was first released on CD in 1990 in original form, and again remixed in 1991 without track 5 but with most of the songs from the 1987 Retaliation album. It was reissued on January 23, 2001, with an addition of three bonus demo tracks and with a different album cover. These songs would be officially recorded later to appear on their next album.

It is considered an essential release in the thrash metal genre.

== Music and lyrics ==
The music on Carnivore contains elements of thrash metal, doom metal and hardcore punk. Revolver said the album's music was "raw, cynical, almost avant-garde." The album contains Latin music elements, and incorporates bongo drums on the track "God is Dead". This track also employs falsetto vocals.

The lyrics on the album are said to be misanthropic and humorous. Topics explored include World War II, post-apocolyptic fiction, and barbarians.

== Artwork ==
AllMusic said that the band wore "the Mad Max apocalyptic caveman attire" on the rear sleeve of the album.

== Critical reception ==
Professional ratings
Review scores
Source	Rating
AllMusic	4.5/5 stars
Kerrang!	4/5 stars
Metal Hammer	7/10

AllMusic gave the album four and a half stars out of five, stating the album's straddling of the line between serious and humorous as one of the reasons for its lasting appeal.

In August 2014, Revolver placed the album on its "14 Thrash Albums You Need to Own" list. The publication considers it an essential release in the genre.

== Track listing ==
Music and lyrics by Peter Steele.

No.	Title	Length
1.	"Predator"	4:33
2.	"Carnivore"	3:22
3.	"Male Supremacy"	7:31
4.	"Armageddon"	4:14
5.	"Legion of Doom"	3:31
6.	"God Is Dead"	4:13
7.	"Thermonuclear Warrior"	5:38
8.	"World Wars III and IV"	10:13

Reissue Bonus Tracks
No.	Title	Length
9.	"U.S.A. for U.S.A." (Demo)	3:32
10.	"S.M.D." (Demo)	2:17
11.	"Sex and Violence" (Demo)	5:19

== Personnel ==
- Lord Petrus Steele – vocals, bass, sound effects
- Keith Alexander – guitar, vocals, sound effects
- Louis Beateaux – drums, percussion, vocals, sound effects

Production

- Produced by Norman Dunn (bonus tracks produced by Peter Steele)
- Engineered by Norman Dunn
- Mixed by Norman Dunn & Michael Marciano
- Remastered by George Marino
