= Lawnmower Deth =

British thrash metal band

- Origin: Ravenshead, Nottinghamshire, England
- Genres: Thrash metal; crossover thrash; comedy rock; skate punk
- Years active: 1987–1993; 2008–present
- Labels: Earache; Dissonance
- Members: Pete Lee; Steve Nesfield; Gavin 'Paddy' O'Malley; Chris Parkes; Chris Billam
- Past members: Chris Flint; Kevin Papworth

Lawnmower Deth are an English thrash metal band, who parodied the genre and recorded four albums. Initially active in the late 1980s and early 1990s, they reformed in 2008.

== Biography ==
=== Main career (1987–1993) ===
Lawnmower Deth were formed in Ravenshead, Nottinghamshire in 1987 by friends Chris Flint, Pete Lee, Steve Nesfield and Chris Parkes from Joseph Whitaker school, along with Gavin 'Paddy' O'Malley from Colwick.

Their first official release was a split album with Metal Duck. Lawnmower Deth's side of the record was entitled Mower Liberation Front and positive responses led to their debut studio album, Ooh Crikey, It's… Lawnmower Deth. Their second studio album, Return of the Fabulous Metal Bozo Clowns, was released in 1992. For this release, Paddy was replaced by Kev Papworth.

The band covered several famous songs in their time, including Fleetwood Mac's "The Chain", Motörhead's self-titled song, Squeeze's "Up the Junction", The Osmonds' "Crazy Horses", and Kim Wilde's "Kids in America" which was released as the band's only single in 1991.

The band's sense of humour extended into their music videos. Both "Kids in America" and "Lawnmowers for Heroes, Comics for Zeros", the latter from Metal Bozo Clowns, were recorded on home video cameras and edited in an amateur fashion.

The band's third studio album, Billy, was released in 1993. The album had a pop punk style similar Green Day instead of thrash metal. Poor sales and a declining audience led the band to break up later on that year.

=== Reunion (2008–present) ===
Lawnmower Deth announced that they would be reuniting to support Welsh metalcore band Bullet for My Valentine for a one-off gig on 15 November 2008 at the Alexandra Palace in London.

The band played at the 2009 Download Festival at Donington Park, their first appearance, and returned to play the festival the following year. Lawnmower Deth then went on to play a main stage slot at Damnation Festival 2010 in Leeds and announced a further date at Redemption in Derby on 28 May 2011. On 12 August, Lawnmower Deth played Bloodstock Open Air festival at Catton Hall in Derbyshire. They appeared at the festival again on 9 August 2015.

Lawnmower Deth played at Hammerfest 4, in Prestatyn, Wales on 16 March 2012, during which requests were made to Earache to re-release their full back catalogue. Their first half-album, Mower Liberation Front was re-released on vinyl and CD in April 2012. It came with the associated Metal Duck half-album Quack Em All and a selection of bonus tracks including the 1988 demo Mowdeer. Early purchasers received a DVD of a concert at Nottingham Rock City from 26 November 1990.

On 20 December 2013, the band played a headline set at the Rescue Rooms in Nottingham. Also on the bill were Line of Fire (featuring Deth member Paddy on guitars), reformed thrash outfit Re-Animator playing their first gig in 25 years, and the also recently reformed Xentrix. The concert and associated raffles, etc. raised money for the hate awareness charity S.O.P.H.I.E. and in excess of £8,000 was collected.

Lawnmower Deth released their first studio album in 29 years, titled Blunt Cutters, on January 28, 2022.

== Members ==
=== Line-up before band break-up ===
- Qualcast "Koffee Perkulator" Mutilator (Pete Lee) – vocals
- Concorde Faceripper (Steve Nesfield) – guitar
- Schizo Rotary Sprintmaster (Gavin 'Paddy' O'Malley) – guitar
- Mightymo Destructimo (Chris Parkes) – bass
- Explodin' Dr Jaggers Flymo (Chris Flint) – drums

=== Former members (as Lawnmower Deth) ===
- Baron Kev von Thresh Meister Silo Stench Chisel Marbels (Kevin Papworth) – guitar
- Dave Lee – Guitar

=== SCRAWM line-up upon formation ===
- Dogg Bower – vocals / guitar
- Dudd Hallam – bass
- Chris Flint – drums
- Rich Brady – guitar

== Discography ==
=== Studio albums ===
- Ooh Crikey It's... Lawnmower Deth (1990)
- Return of the Fabulous Metal Bozo Clowns (1992)
- Billy (1993)
- Blunt Cutters (2022)

=== Singles ===
- "Kids in America" (1991) (No.139)
- "F U Kristmas!" (with Kim Wilde) (2017)

=== Demos ===
- It's a Lot Less Bover Than a Hover (1987)
- Mowdeer (1988)

=== Other releases ===
- Mower Liberation Front (1989, split album with Metal Duck)
