= Insult to Injury =

Studio album by Whiplash
- Released: August 14, 1989
- Genre: Thrash metal
- Length: 36:52; 59:00 (reissue)
- Label: Roadrunner

Whiplash chronology
Ticket to Mayhem (1987)	Insult to Injury (1989)	Cult of One (1996)

Professional ratings
Review scores
Source	Rating
AllMusic	3/5 stars

Insult to Injury is the third studio album by American thrash metal band Whiplash. It follows 1987's Ticket to Mayhem. It was seven years before a largely changed line-up recorded a new album, Cult of One.

This album saw the addition of vocalist Glenn Hansen as Tony Portaro concentrated on guitar duties instead of the dual role performed on previous albums.

Metal Hammer included the album cover on their list of "50 most hilariously ugly rock and metal album covers ever".

== Track listing ==
Lyrics by Hansen on 1, 4, 8, 9. Lyrics by Portaro & Hansen on 3, 5, 6, 7. Lyrics by Portaro, Hansen & Cangelosi on 10. Lyrics by Hansen & Cangelosi on 2. Music by Portaro on 10. Music by Portaro & Bono on 3, 8. Music by Portaro, Bono & Cangelosi on 1, 2, 4, 5, 6, 7, 9.

No.	Title	Length
1.	"Voice of Sanity"	3:37
2.	"Hiroshima"	3:14
3.	"Insult to Injury"	2:42
4.	"Dementia Thirteen"	3:02
5.	"Essence of Evil"	5:59
6.	"Witness to the Terror"	3:58
7.	"Battle Scars"	4:27
8.	"Rape of the Mind"	2:29
9.	"Ticket to Mayhem / 4 E.S."	4:07
10.	"Pistolwhipped"	3:17

Reissue bonus tracks
No.	Title	Length
11.	"Spit on Your Grave" (Live)	5:20
12.	"Red Bomb" (Live)	3:27
13.	"Cyanide Grenade" (Live)	4:08
14.	"Warmonger" (Live)	3:35
15.	"Stagedive" (Live)	2:58

== Credits ==
- Glenn Hansen – vocals
- Tony Portaro – guitar
- Tony Bono – bass
- Joe Cangelosi – drums
