= Roar (album) =

Studio album by Whiplash
- Released: November 27, 2026
- Studios: Studio Mozart; Concrete Island Studio
- Length: 36:51
- Label: Time to Kill Records
- Producer: Tony Portaro

Whiplash chronology
| Unborn Again (2009) | Roar (2026) |

Singles from Roar
- 1. "Bullet Train" Released: September 23, 2026

Roar is the upcoming eighth studio album by American thrash metal band Whiplash, due for release on November 27, 2026. It will be the band's first studio album since Unborn Again (2009), making it the longest gap between two albums in their career.

Following nearly 15 years of attempted work on an EP titled Old School American Way, which was later converted into a full-length album, the original version of Roar was released under the title Thrashquake in early 2026, in limited form to coincide with Whiplash's European tour with Napalm Death.

== Track listing ==
Roar track listing
| No. | Title | Length |
|---|---|---|
| 1. | "Thrashquake" | 3:55 |
| 2. | "Bullet Train" | 3:54 |
| 3. | "Can't Take Back a Bullet" | 4:04 |
| 4. | "Sword Meet Skull" | 3:24 |
| 5. | "Who Stole My Whiskey" | 3:54 |
| 6. | "When the Deadman Calls" | 3:50 |
| 7. | "Red Tape Riot" | 3:13 |
| 8. | "Mother's Kill Club" | 2:53 |
| 9. | "Sonic Asylum" | 3:42 |
| 10. | "Graveyard of Good and Evil" | 4:02 |
| Total length: | | 36:51 |
