= Sit Stand Kneel Prey =

Studio album by Whiplash
- Released: September 23, 1997
- Genre: Heavy metal, thrash metal
- Length: 49:32
- Label: Massacre Records
- Producer: Steve Evetts

Whiplash chronology
Cult of One (1996)	Sit Stand Kneel Prey (1997)	Thrashback (1998)

Sit Stand Kneel Prey is the fifth studio album by American thrash metal band Whiplash. It was released in September 1997 via Massacre Records and comes only one year after their previous album, Cult of One.

Vocalist Rob Gonzo's stay was short-lived and Warren Conditi stepped in to take up vocal as well as guitar duties. Tony Scaglione also left and was replaced by Bob Candella on drums – leaving Portaro as the only remaining Tony of the original Tony trio. The band's next album, Thrashback, was to see a reunion of the original line-up, however.

== Track listing ==
No.	Title	Length
1.	"Climb Out of Hell"	4:14
2.	"Left Unsaid"	4:08
3.	"Hitlist"	3:52
4.	"Cyanide Grenade"	4:12
5.	"Jane Doe"	4:14
6.	"Knock Me Down"	5:25
7.	"Lack of Contrition"	5:55
8.	"Word to the Wise"	4:11
9.	"Strangeface"	5:13
10.	"Catharsis"	1:21
11.	"Sit, Stand, Kneel, Prey"	6:47

== Credits ==
- Backing Vocals – LJ Snyder, Phil Dezago, Whiplash (5)
- Bass Guitar – Jimmy Preziosa
- Drums, Percussion – Bob Candella
- Engineer – Stephen Rajkumar
- Guitar – Tony Portaro
- Other [Associate Production] – TNT Productions
- Other [Dtp] – M. Herkle
- Photography By [Album Cover Shots] – Danny Muro*
- Producer – Steve Evetts
- Strings [Assisted By] – Steve Evetts
- Vocals, Guitar, Keyboards – Warren Conditi
