= Keith Alexander (guitarist) =

American guitarist (1963–2005)

- Born: Keith Alexander Bonanno; November 23, 1963; Brooklyn, New York, U.S.
- Died: July 11, 2005 (aged 41)
- Genres: Crossover thrash, thrash metal
- Occupation: Musician
- Instrument: Guitar
- Years active: 1982–2005
- Formerly of: Carnivore, Primal Scream, Dee Snider

Keith Alexander (born Keith Alexander Bonanno; November 23, 1963 – July 11, 2005) was an American guitarist.

== Career ==
Alexander was the guitarist for the thrash metal band Carnivore, on whose first album he played. He then joined Brooklyn-based band Primal Scream co-writing and recording their 1987 album Volume One.

During the late 1990s he was a member of Dee Snider's SMFs and part of the lineup that recorded the 1997 Twisted Forever – SMFs Live album. Alexander also worked as a talent finder, though he was technically credited as "piercing consultant" on Snider's movie 1998 movie Strangeland. To save money on special effects and for a sense of reality in appearance, Alexander looked in the body modification community for extras, who were modded for some roles.

In the 2000s, he became a somewhat well known blogger, being associated with blogs such as BrooklynVegan and Boing Boing.

== Death ==
Alexander died in a cycling accident on July 11, 2005. He lost control of his bike while passing a child and crashed into a fence on Shore Road, in Bay Ridge Brooklyn. It was reported that had he been wearing a helmet he would likely have survived. Alexander's website, nootrope.net, still exists at archive.org. Regarding his death, he states:

I look at this place as a scrapbook / journal. A digital version of the paper ones I've kept my entire life. Nothing more, nothing less. Don't read any more into it than necessary. And in a morbid way, a record of my predilections that will hopefully live on after I die, on some server, somewhere. Grandiose? Maybe. Maybe I just have the balls to admit it. Maybe one day, in the year 2201, a relation of mine will see these zeros and ones, and say, "Damn, he had fun." That is, if we don't annihilate one and other. [sic]

== Discography ==
- Carnivore – Carnivore (Roadrunner, 1985)
- Primal Scream – Volume One (Mercenary, 1987)
- Dee Snider's S.M.F. – Twisted Forever – SMFs Live (Coallier Ent., 1997)
