= Tarantula (band) =

Portuguese power metal band

Tarantula is a Portuguese power metal band established in 1981, and ranked as one of the first power metal bands. Active ever since, Tarantula has played many concerts throughout Europe with a larger emphasis in Portugal and Germany. The current members of the band are Jorge Marques (vocals), Paulo Barros (guitar), José Aguiar (bass) and Luís Barros (drums).

== Members ==
Jorge Marques (vocals) - Jorge is the singer of Tarantula since 1989. He is also a painter and a plastic artist. His first band was the Portuguese thrash metal band Web.

Paulo Barros (guitars) - Paulo is a Portuguese guitarist and one of the founders of the band. As a solo artist Paulo has played in the 1980s and 1990s in several European countries.

Luís Barros (drums) - Luis along with his brother Paulo Barros is one of the founding members of the band. Luís is also a producer and a recording engineer and has been is in charge of recording, mixing and producing many of the bands records since their inception. Luís owns and runs the recording studio Rec'n'Roll where many relatively successful metal and rock bands have recorded.

José Aguiar (bass) - José is the bass player of Tarantula since 1994. Before Tarantula he was a member of the Portuguese rock band Roxigénio.

== Discography ==
=== Studio albums ===
- 1987: Tarantula
- 1990: Kingdom of Lusitania
- 1993: III
- 1995: Freedom’s Call
- 1998: Light Beyond the Dark
- 2000: Dream Maker
- 2005: Metalmorphosis
- 2010: Spiral of Fear
- 2021: Thunder Tunes From Lusitania

== Tributes ==
- 2001: 20 Anos de Tarantula – Tributo

== Paulo Barros discography ==
=== Studio albums ===
- 1997: Vintage
- 2003: Gemini
- 2007: K:arma 7
- 2015: 4
- 2018: More Humanity Please
