= Whiplash (band) =

American thrash metal band

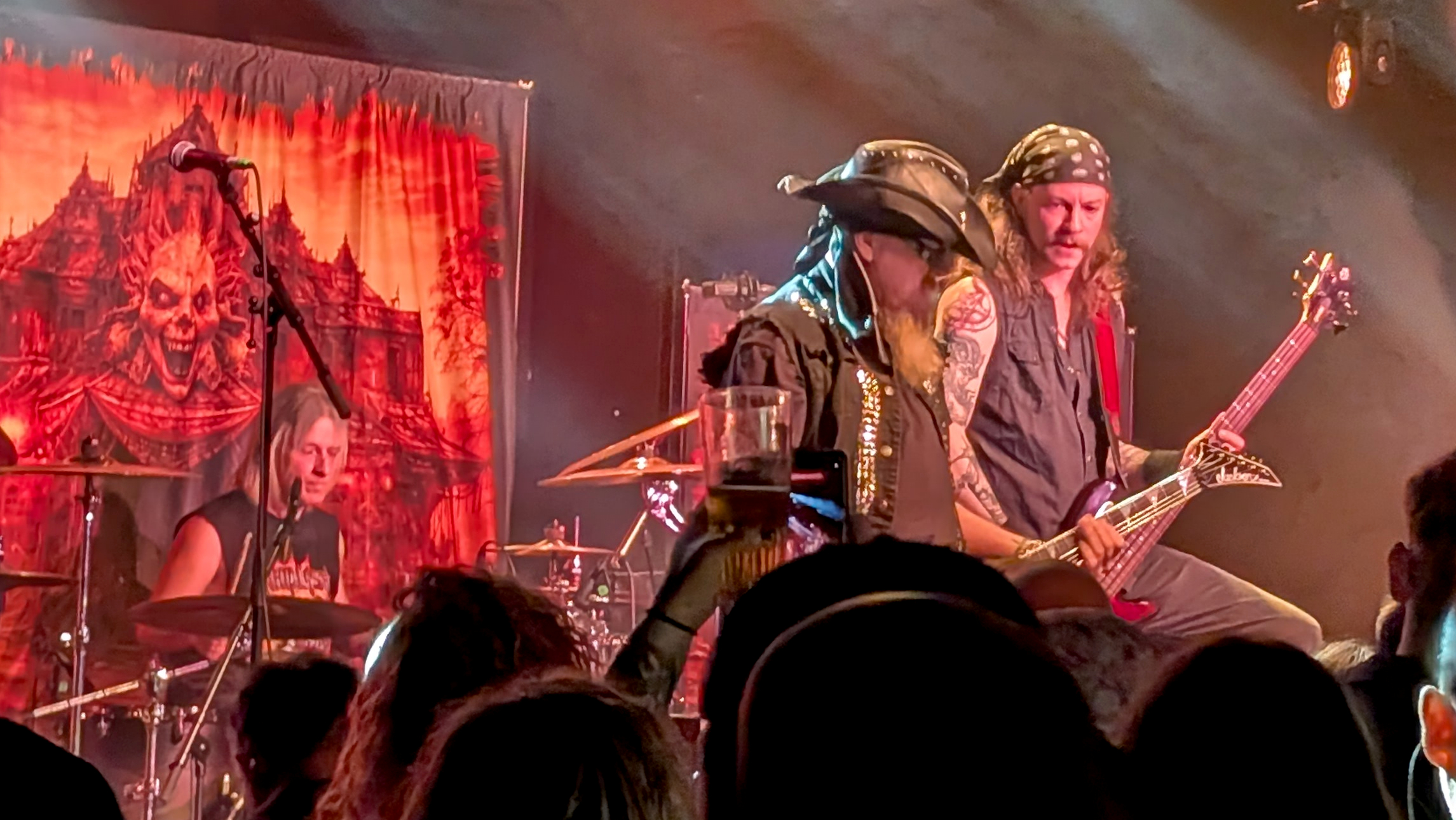
- Whiplash in 2026, Drachten (NL)

Background information
- Origin: Passaic, New Jersey, U.S.
- Genres: Thrash metal; speed metal
- Years active: 1984–1990; 1995–1999; 2007–present
- Labels: Roadrunner; Massacre; Pulverised; Metal Blade
- Members: Tony Portaro; Will Winton; Ron Lipnicki
- Past members: See below
- Website: officialwhiplash.com

Whiplash is an American thrash metal band formed in 1984 in Passaic, New Jersey. They are centered around guitarist and vocalist Tony Portaro, the only remaining original member. Despite lacking major success, Whiplash has been recognized as one of the first East Coast thrash metal bands of the 1980s, and are notable for featuring drummer Tony Scaglione, who had been in and out of Whiplash since its inception, and temporarily filled-in for Dave Lombardo on Slayer's Reign in Blood tour.

== History ==
The original lineup of Tony Portaro, Tony Scaglione, and Tony Bono recorded their debut album, Power and Pain, released on Roadrunner Records in 1986. Joe Cangelosi replaced Scaglione that year when the latter left for a seven-week tour with Slayer. Cangelosi recorded Ticket to Mayhem in 1987 with Portaro and Bono. In 1989, singer Glenn Hansen joined the band for the album Insult to Injury. The band split up due to business reasons, but reunited in 1995 after Portaro and Scaglione joined a revamped lineup of Billy Milano's M.O.D. for a European tour. Whiplash released two further albums, Cult of One (1996) and Sit Stand Kneel Prey (1997), before the trio recorded a final album, Thrashback (1998), and the band again broke up in 1999.

Bassist Tony Bono died in 2002 after suffering a heart attack, at the age of 38.

In 2009, Portaro and Cangelosi reformed the band with bassist Rich Day, and recorded Unborn Again, released in September 2009. Whiplash played many festivals in Europe that year, including Wacken Open Air in Germany, Jalometalli festival in Finland, and shows in Italy, Norway, Mexico and Colombia.

In 2010, the band took a break due to personal legal reasons. In early December 2010, Portaro announced Scaglione's return to the band. They recruited New York bassist David DeLong. After two weeks, Scaglione announced that personal scheduling issues had become his priority. With Ben Ward of Orange Goblin and Nathan Perrier of Alabaster Suns, Labrat and Capricorns, Dan Foord (SikTh) joined the band.

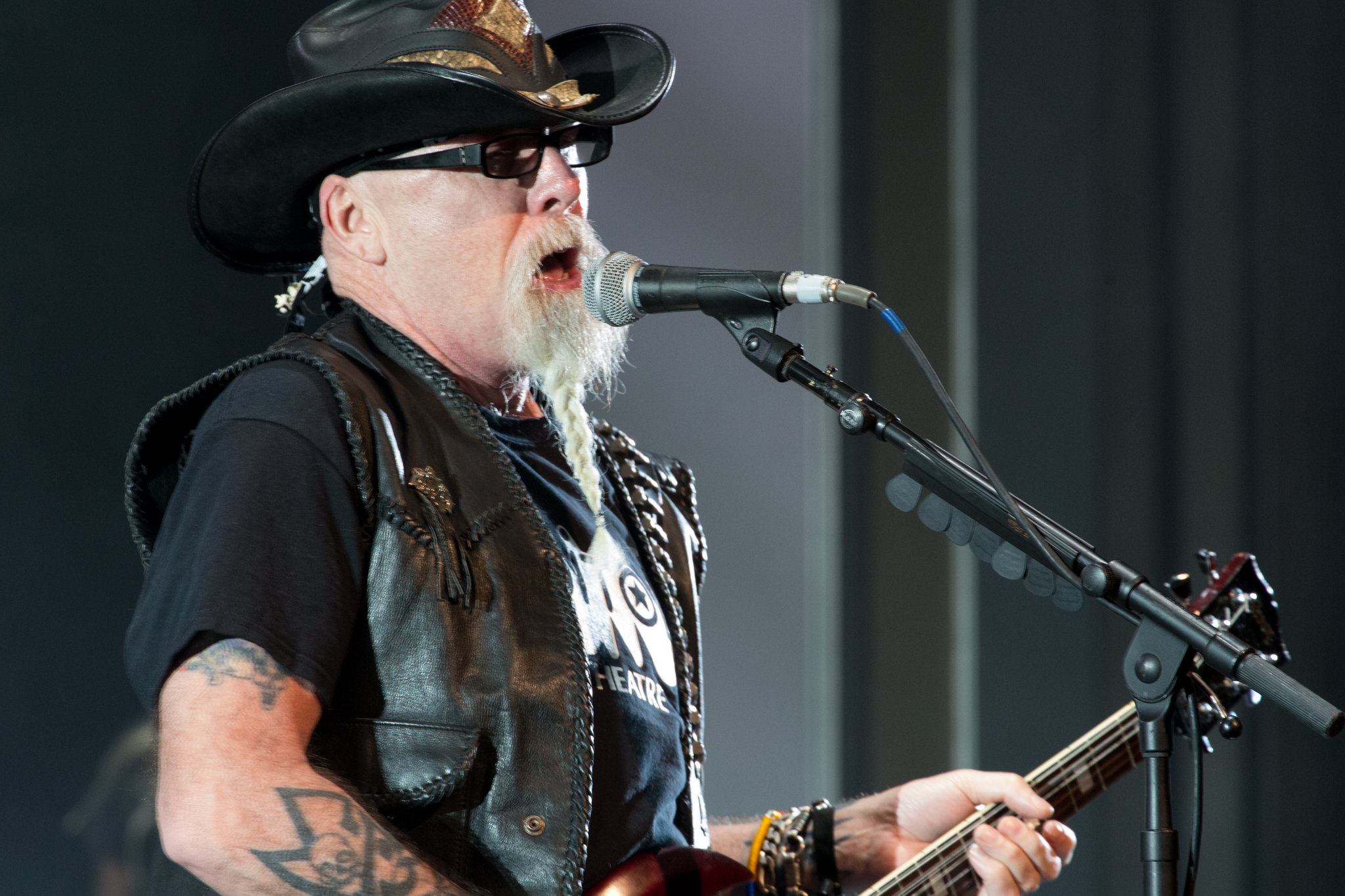
Tony Portaro at 70000 Tons of Metal in 2015

Whiplash launched their Power and Pain 2011 tour with dates in Greece and Italy in April 2011. Following performances at Hellfest (France) and Clifton, New Jersey, Whiplash headlined the San Francisco festival Slaughter by the Water 2. After returning from California, they wrote new material and held another New Jersey performance before finishing their tour in Chile. In January 2012, Whiplash headlined thrash metal shows in Philadelphia and New Jersey before embarking on 70000 Tons of Metal aboard the Royal Caribbean ship Majesty of the Seas. In March and April, Whiplash performed in the Netherlands, at Keep It True in Germany, and the SWR Barroselas Metalfest in Portugal. The band headlined the Convivencia Rock festival in Pereira, Colombia in July 2012.

On October 10, 2015, Whiplash announced they were reuniting with Scaglione. However, this reunion did not last for long, and the band replaced him with Tom Tierney, who was later replaced by former Overkill drummer Ron Lipnicki.

In July 2018, Whiplash signed with Metal Blade Records, and an album tentatively titled Old School American Way was teased for nearly a decade. The album was scrapped in favor of Thrashquake, which was released in early 2026 in limited form to coincide with their European tour with Napalm Death. On August 26, 2026, the band announced that the album, now titled Roar, would be re-released on November 27.

== Band members ==
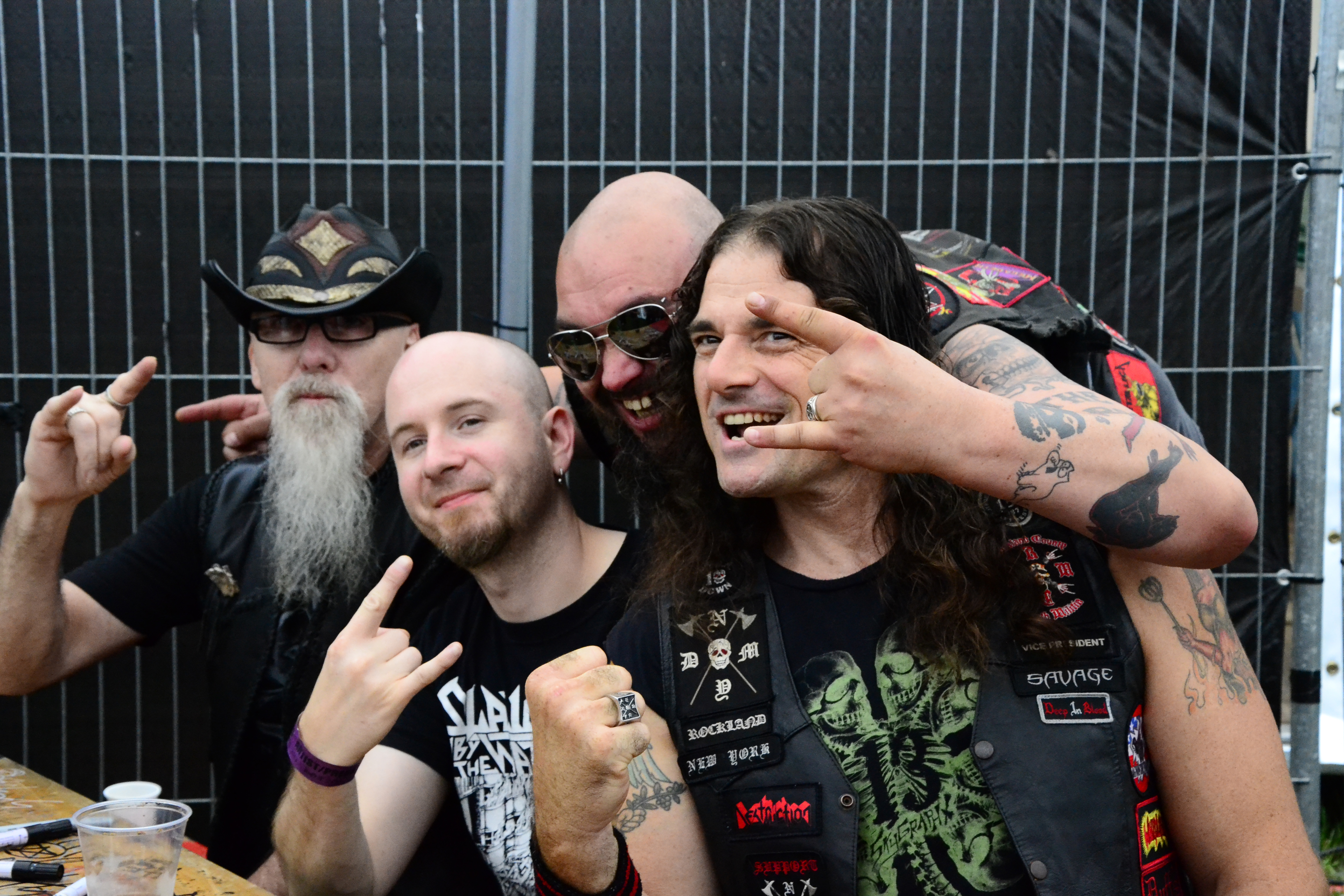
Whiplash at the Headbangers Open Air 2014

Current members

- Tony Portaro – guitars, lead vocals (1984–1999, 2007–present)
- Will Winton – bass, backing and lead vocals (2022–present)
- Ron Lipnicki – drums (2018–present)

Former members

- Rich Day – bass, backing vocals (2007–2011)
- Tony Bono – bass, backing vocals (1984–1990, 1993, 1998–1999; died 2002)
- Joe Cangelosi – drums (1987–1990, 2007–2010)
- Pat Burns – bass (1984)
- Mike Orosz – lead vocals (1984)
- Glenn Hansen – lead vocals (1989–1990)
- Rob Gonzo – lead vocals (1995–1997)
- Rob Harding – bass (1984)
- James Preziosa – bass (1995–1998)
- Warren Conditi – guitars (1995–1998), lead vocals (1997–1998)
- Henry Veggian – lead vocals (1993)
- Dave Jengo – guitars (1993)
- Bob Candella – drums (1997–1998)
- Dan Foord – drums (2011–2014)
- Charlie Zeleny – drums (2014–2015)
- Tony Scaglione – drums (1984–1987, 1993, 1996–1997, 1998–1999, 2010–2011, 2015–2016)
- Tom Tierney – drums (2016–2018)
- David DeLong – bass, backing vocals (2011–2022)

Timeline

== Discography ==
=== Albums ===
- Power and Pain (1986)
- Ticket to Mayhem (1987)
- Insult to Injury (1989)
- Cult of One (1996)
- Sit Stand Kneel Prey (1997)
- Thrashback (1998)
- Unborn Again (2009)
- Roar (2026)

=== Demos ===
- Fire Away (1984)
- Thunderstruk (1984)
- Looking Death in the Face (1985)
- Untitled 3-track demo (1985)
