= Blood Feast (band) =

American thrash metal band

- Also known as: Bloodlust (1985–1986)
- Origin: Bayonne, New Jersey, U.S.
- Genre: Thrash metal
- Years active: 1985–1991, 1999, 2007–present
- Labels: Hells Headbangers, New Renaissance, Colossal
- Members: Chris Natalini; CJ Scioscia; Dave Kramer; James DeMaria; Rich Bukowski
- Past members: Kevin Kuzma; Lou Starita; Gary Markovitch; Mike Basden; Adam Tranquilli; Tom Lorenzo; Karl Odenwalder; Tony Stanziano; John Blicharz; Joe Moore; Adam Kieffer
- Website: bloodfeastlegions.com

Blood Feast is an American thrash metal band formed in Bayonne, New Jersey in 1985 under the name of Bloodlust. The band broke up in 1991 but reunited for a concert in 1999 and got back together again in 2007. To date, Blood Feast has released four studio albums, four compilation albums, two EPs and one demo cassette.

== History ==
=== Initial career (1985–1991) ===
The band was formed in 1985 by drummer Kevin Kuzma, bassist Louis Starita, vocalist Gary Markovitch, and guitarist Adam Tranquilli under the name Bloodlust. In February 1986, the band recorded their first demo, The Suicidal Missions. In the same month, Michael Basden joined as second guitarist. Shortly after, the band changed its name to Blood Feast. In June 1986, the band signed to a contract. The recordings for the first album were financed by the band itself. In February 1987, the band released their debut album Kill for Pleasure, and followed the release with some live performances, finishing each concert with a cover version of "Into Crypts of Rays" by Celtic Frost. In December 1987, the band recorded an EP (Face Fate). In June 1988 the band recorded a ten-song demo. Guitarist Adam Tranquili was no longer active by this time. Although initially titled The Last Remains, it was released as an album in 1989 under the name Chopping Block Blues. The band broke up in 1991.

=== Reunions (1999–2013) ===
In 1999, the band reformed for a single appearance at the March Metal Meltdown in Asbury Park, New Jersey.

In 2002, Kevin Kuzma founded his own label, Militia Records, and released the compilation, Remnants: The Last Remains. On this were demo and live recordings, as well as certain unreleased songs. In 2007, the band rejoined. This line-up featured founding members Kevin Kuzma and Adam Tranquili, along with guitarist John Blicharz, bassist Karl Odenwalder, and singer Tony Stanziano; all of whom were from Kevin Kuzma's death metal band, Annunaki.

Current bass player Tom Lorenzo (who replaced Odenwalder) and vocalist Chris Natalini (who replaced Stanziano) were added in 2010, just a few months ahead of the band's performance at the Headbangers Open Air Festival in Germany. Blood Feast returned for a 2nd appearance at H.O.A. in 2013. This incarnation of the band remained intact until March 2014, at which point Kuzma and Blicharz were replaced by Joe Moore (formerly of DTA and Nemesis) and CJ Scioscia (of Insaniac and Skullshifter), respectively.

=== The Future State of Wicked and Infinite Evolution (2014–present) ===
A pre-production demo of the first new Blood Feast song in nearly 25 years, entitled "Off With Their Heads", was made available for streaming via YouTube in August 2014. The new line-up then had its debut performance at Empire in West Springfield, VA on September 13, 2014, and has been active ever since. Two performances at the True Thrash Fest in Osaka, Japan occurred on February 21–22, 2015.

On September 25, 2015, Blood Feast announced that they had signed with Hells Headbangers Records, and by the next year, they had been recording their first studio album since 1989 at LCBW Recording in Watchung, New Jersey. The album, titled, The Future State of Wicked, was released on April 14, 2017.

In June 2022, Blood Feast revealed Infinite Evolution as the title of their fourth album, which was not released until July 12, 2024.

== Discography ==
=== Studio albums ===
- Kill for Pleasure (1987)
- Chopping Block Blues (1989)
- The Future State of Wicked (2017)
- Infinite Evolution (2024)

=== Compilation albums ===
- Thrash Metal Attack (1986)
- Speed Metal Hell, Vol. 3 (1987)
- Remnants: The Last Remains (2002)
- Last Offering Before the Chopping Block (2013)

=== Splits ===
- Kill for Pleasure / Annihilation (1989)

=== EPs ===
- Face Fate (1987)
- Chopped, Sliced and Diced (2018)

=== Demos ===
- The Suicidal Missions (1986)
