= Heresy (Paradox album) =

Studio album by Paradox
- Released: 20 November 1989
- Recorded: January–July 1989
- Studio: Music Lab Studio, West Berlin
- Genre: Thrash metal, speed metal, power metal
- Length: 42:11
- Label: Roadrunner Records
- Producer: Harris Johns

Paradox chronology
Product of Imagination (1987)	Heresy (1989)	Collision Course (2000)

Professional ratings
Review scores
Source	Rating
AllMusic	4.5/5 stars
The Metal Crypt	(4.7/5)
Sea of Tranquility	4/5 stars

Heresy is the second album by German thrash metal band Paradox, released in 1989. The album preaches a conceptual story about the Albigensian Crusade of the 13th century. It is Paradox's best selling album to date, and was the band's last studio album for 11 years, until Collision Course (2000).

Heresy was reissued by the German label High Vaultage Records in 1999, which contains two bonus tracks. The album was reissued again on 13 August 2007 by Metal Mind Productions from Poland as a digipak on golden disc, featuring bonus tracks, digitally remastered using 24-bit process and limited to 2,000 copies.

== Track listing ==
No.	Title	Length
1.	"Heresy"	6:55
2.	"Search for Perfection"	4:54
3.	"Killtime"	4:51
4.	"Crusaders Revenge"	4:56
5.	"The Burning"	5:26
6.	"Massacre of the Cathars"	4:19
7.	"Serenity"	4:53
8.	"700 Years On"	5:14
9.	"Castle in the Wind" (instrumental)	1:33

2007 reissue bonus tracks
No.	Title	Length
10.	"The Burning" (demo)	5:57
11.	"Massacre of the Cathars" (demo)	3:48
12.	"Heresy" (live video)	6:55

== Personnel ==
- Charly Steinhauer – vocals, guitar
- Markus Spyth – guitar
- Matthias "K.ter" Fries (Schmitt) – bass
- Axel Blaha – drums
