= Retaliation (Carnivore album) =

Studio album by Carnivore
- Released: September 1987; 1991 (CD); 2001 (reissue); 2008 (remastered)
- Genres: Crossover thrash, hardcore punk
- Length: 44:23
- Label: Roadrunner
- Producer: Alex Perialas

Carnivore chronology
Carnivore (1985)	Retaliation (1987)

Alternative cover
- Cover art for the 2001 reissue

Retaliation is the second and final studio album by American crossover thrash band Carnivore, released in 1987 by Roadrunner Records. It was later released on CD in 1991 without tracks 4 and 9. It was re-issued with a different cover on January 23, 2001, containing three demo tracks from the previous album.

The same image was also used (with different editing) by the Italian hardcore band Wretched for the cover of their EP "In Nome del Loro Potere Tutto è Stato Fatto" released in March 1983, and by the Argentinian heavy metal band Apocalipsis for the cover of the album "Endemoniado - A los Héroes de Malvinas" released in June 1985.

== Critical reception ==
Professional ratings
Review scores
Source	Rating
AllMusic	4.5/5 stars
Metal Hammer	7/10

In 2005, Retaliation was ranked number 316 in Rock Hard magazine's book of The 500 Greatest Rock & Metal Albums of All Time.

== Track listing ==
All tracks are written by Peter Steele, except when noted.

No.	Title	Writer(s)	Length
1.	"Jack Daniel's and Pizza"		0:55
2.	"Angry Neurotic Catholics"		2:48
3.	"S.M.D."		2:27
4.	"Ground Zero Brooklyn"		4:40
5.	"Race War"		5:56
6.	"Inner Conflict"		5:03
7.	"Jesus Hitler"		5:17
8.	"Technophobia"		3:56
9.	"Manic Depression" (Jimi Hendrix cover)	Jimi Hendrix	3:07
10.	"USA for USA"		3:21
11.	"Five Billion Dead"		3:02
12.	"Sex and Violence"		3:51

Reissue Bonus Tracks
No.	Title	Length
13.	"World Wars III and IV" (Demo)	7:42
14.	"Carnivore" (Demo)	3:41
15.	"The Subhuman" (Demo)	11:09

== Credits ==
=== Carnivore ===
- Peter Steele – bass, lead vocals
- Marc Piovanetti – guitars, backing vocals
- Louie Beato – drums

=== Production ===
- Produced and mixed By Alex Perialas
- Engineered by Michael Marciano and Alex Perialas
