= Lȧȧz Rockit =

American thrash metal band

Background information
- Also known as: Depth Charge
- Origin: San Francisco, California, U.S.
- Genres: Thrash metal; heavy metal; power metal (early)
- Years active: 1981–1992; 2005–2011 (on hiatus)
- Labels: OSM Records; Enigma; Massacre
- Members: Michael Coons; Aaron Jellum; Phil Kettner; Sky Harris
- Past members: Victor Agnello; Willy Lange; Dave Starr; Scott Dominguez; Dave Chavarri; Ken Savich; Jon Torres; Scott Sargeant; Sven Soderlund; Matt Vander Ende

Lȧȧz Rockit was an American thrash metal band formed in San Francisco, California, in 1981. The band is most notable for its association with the Bay Area thrash metal scene of the 1980s.

== History ==
=== Initial career and split (1981–1992) ===
Originally called Depth Charge, Lȧȧz Rockit was formed in 1981 in Berkeley, California, by vocalist Michael Coons and guitarist Aaron Jellum. Coons was 17, about to graduate high school, and Jellum was 18, busy attending college and riding motorcycles. They knew what musical direction they wanted to pursue. After performing with various members, Coons and Jellum came across guitarist Phil Kettner and drummer Victor Agnello in late 1982 or early 1983. By the time bassist Willy Lange joined in 1983 to complete the lineup of the band, Depth Charge had changed its name to Lȧȧz Rockit. Its first recording was the Prelude to Death demo, which was released that year. The band later signed with Target Records to release its debut album, City's Gonna Burn, in 1984, followed one year later by No Stranger to Danger. This period saw Lȧȧz Rockit play with a wide variety of bands, such as the "Big Four" of thrash metal—Metallica, Slayer, Megadeth and Anthrax—as well as Exodus, Ratt, W.A.S.P., Girlschool, Y&T, Leatherwolf, Kix, Dark Angel, Suicidal Tendencies, Stryper and Armored Saint. The band made its first appearance in Europe in 1986, supporting Motörhead. Its presence helped forge a new, heavier musical direction for the band and formed a unique relationship with European fans.

Lȧȧz Rockit released its next two albums, Know Your Enemy in 1987 and Annihilation Principle in 1989, under the labels Roadrunner/Enigma Records. Both albums were well-received by fans and critics. The band shared the stage with the likes of Metallica, Megadeth, Anthrax, Overkill, Testament, M.O.D., Celtic Frost, Kreator, Voivod, Nuclear Assault, Vio-lence, Forbidden, Metal Church, D.B.C., Suicidal Tendencies, the Cro-Mags, Faith No More and L.A. Guns. Later in 1989, Lange, Kettner and Agnello left the band for various reasons, leaving Coons and Jellum as the only remaining members. The two soon recruited guitarist Scott Sargeant, bassist Scott Dominguez and drummer Dave Chavarri. In 1991, the band's fifth album, Nothing's Sacred, was released. After touring in the United States and Europe from 1991 to 1992 and appearing in Japan in 1992, the band split up. Most of the members then formed the short-lived groove-oriented thrash metal band Gack, replacing Chavarri with Defiance drummer Matt Vander Ende.

=== Reunion (2005–present) ===
In 2005, Lȧȧz Rockit reformed with the original lineup, performing a return show at the Dynamo Open Air in May of that year. On July 9, 2005, the band teamed up with other bands to perform in San Francisco for a benefit concert dubbed Thrash Against Cancer. In September 2005, the band returned to Japan. Later, Lȧȧz Rockit announced that they would not record a new album. However, after the response to its shows in April 2007 and the sales of its Live Untold DVD, released in 2006, it was announced that the band would undertake a project intended to result in a new album for release in 2007 or early 2008. In 2007, new drummer Sky Harris joined the band. On May 27, 2008, Lȧȧz Rockit posted two new songs from its then-upcoming release Left for Dead on its official Myspace page. The album was released on July 25, 2008, on the German label Massacre Records. The band also announced that its back catalogue would be re-released and remastered; however, Nothing's Sacred was not mentioned for a re-release.

On December 9, 2011, the band opened for Metallica on the third concert of its 30th anniversary party at The Fillmore.

On June 1, 2014, drummer Victor Agnello died at the age of 50 after battling leukemia for over a year. On October 23, 2018, bassist Willy Lange died at the age of 57 from injuries sustained in a motorcycle accident.

Although no official breakup or hiatus was announced, Lȧȧz Rockit has been inactive since opening for Metallica in 2011. By 2016, there were reports of the band writing a follow-up to 2008's Left for Dead. The band's official website had been defunct by March 2017.

== Band members ==
Final lineup

- Michael Coons – vocals (1981–1992, 2005–2011)
- Aaron Jellum – guitar (1981–1992, 2005–2011)
- Phil Kettner – guitar (1981–1989, 2005–2011)
- Sky Harris – drums (2007–2011)

Past members

- Scott Weller – guitar (1989–1990)
- Scott Sargeant – guitar (1990–1992)
- Dave Starr – bass (1981–1983)
- Willy Lange – bass (1983–1989, 2005–2011; died 2018)
- Jon Torres – bass (1989–1990; died 2013)
- Scott Dominguez – bass (1991–1992)
- Victor Agnello – drums (1983–1989, 2005–2006; died 2014)
- Sven Soderlund – drums (1989–1990)
- Dave Chavarri – drums (1990–1992)

== Discography ==
Studio albums

- City's Gonna Burn (1984)
- No Stranger to Danger (1985)
- Know Your Enemy (1987)
- Annihilation Principle (1989)
- Nothing's Sacred (1991)
- Left for Dead (2008)

Singles

- "Leatherface" (1990)
- "Holiday in Cambodia" (1990)

Demos

- Prelude to Death (1983)

Live albums

- Taste of Rebellion – Live in Citta (1992)

Videos

- European Meltdown (1988)
- Taste of Rebellion – Live in Citta (1992)
- Live Untold (2006)
