= Sleeze Beez =

Dutch rock band

Background information
- Origin: Amsterdam, Netherlands
- Genres: Glam metal, hard rock, sleaze rock
- Years active: 1987–1996, 2010–2011
- Labels: Red Bullet, Atlantic
- Members: Chris Van Jaarsveld; Jan Koster; Don Van Spall; Ed Jongsma; Andrew Elt
- Past members: Tigo "Tiger" Fawzi; Thijs Hamelaers
- Website: sleezebeez.com

Sleeze Beez was a Dutch glam metal band formed in 1987. They released four studio albums and one live album over a nine-year career before disbanding in 1996. Their 1989 album Screwed Blued & Tattooed peaked at number 115 on the US Billboard 200 chart, and the song "Stranger Than Paradise" off the album was a hit on MTV. In 1992 after a long tour, they released the album Powertool on Atlantic Records, which contained the ballad "I Don't Want to Live Without You" and was a minor hit.

== History ==
Sleeze Beez was formed by drummer Jan Koster and guitarist Chriz van Jaarsveld in 1987. The first recordings were made with the Belgian singer Tigo "Tiger" Fawzi, for the album Look Like Hell. He was briefly followed by Thijs Hamelaers.

In 1989, the Beez got more stability by recruiting the English vocalist Andrew Elt, who previously sang in Gin on the Rocks. They cut the successful Screwed Blued & Tattooed LP which broke them in the U.S., and they took up as opening act for Skid Row. On the strength of the hit single "Stranger Than Paradise", the band then did 90 headline shows throughout the U.S. and Canada.

In the early nineties, momentum slowed for the band, which increasingly found that the musical tide had turned, and there was less demand for glam metal bands. Meanwhile, popularity overseas particularly in Japan remained strong and the band toured there in 1995. A live album, Live in Tokyo, was released that same year.

In 1996, Koster, who for years had struggled with a wrist injury announced that he could not continue. At this point, the band fell apart. In later years, Koster with Van Jaarsveld and Jongsma formed the band Jetland, which focused mainly on punk rock and landed in the Dutch Top 40 with the single "And the Crowd Goes". Andrew Elt and Don van Spall played in the cover band The Heavy 70's, and in The Moon, a band with original material.

They reformed in 2010. The band supported Aerosmith alongside Stone Temple Pilots on 23 June 2010 at the GelreDome in Arnhem and announced a headlining appearance on 4 February 2011 at the Paradiso in Amsterdam.

== Band members ==
Principal members

- Chriz Van Jaarsveld – guitar, backing vocals (1987–1996, 2010–2011)
- Don Van Spall – guitar, backing vocals (1987–1996, 2010–2011)
- Ed Jongsma – bass guitar, backing vocals (1987–1996, 2010–2011)
- Jan Koster – drums, backing vocals (1987–1996, 2010–2011)
- Andrew Elt – vocals, guitar, harmonica (1988–1996, 2010–2011)

Past members

- Tigo "Tiger" Fawzi – vocals (1987–1988)
- Thijs Hamelaers – vocals (1988)

== Discography ==
=== Studio albums ===
- Look Like Hell (1987)
- Screwed Blued & Tattooed (1990) (US No. 115)
- Powertool (1992)
- Insanity Beach (1994)

=== Live albums ===
- Live in Tokyo (1995)
- Screwed Live! (2010)

=== Compilation albums ===
- The Very Best of Sleeze Beez (2010)

=== Singles ===
- "Shame, Shame, Shame" (1987)
- "Girls Girls, Nasty Nasty" (1987)
- "Stranger Than Paradise" (1990) (US No. 21 Album Rock Tracks)
- "Heroes Die Young" (1990)
- "Raise a Little Hell" (1992)
- "I Don't Want to Live Without You" (1993)
- "Bring Out the Rebel" (1993)
- "Scream" (1994)
- "Gun Culture" (1994)
- "Hate Rock and Roll" (1994)
- "Youth Is A State Of Mind" (1995)
