= Know Your Enemy (Lȧȧz Rockit album) =

Studio album by Lȧȧz Rockit
- Released: September 16, 1987
- Recorded: 1987
- Studio: Prairie Sun Recorders in Cotati, California, USA
- Genre: Thrash metal
- Label: Roadrunner/Enigma
- Producer: Roy M. Rowland

Lȧȧz Rockit chronology
No Stranger to Danger (1985)	Know Your Enemy (1987)	Annihilation Principle (1989)

Professional ratings
Review scores
Source	Rating
AllMusic	4.5/5 stars

Know Your Enemy is the third studio album by American thrash metal band Lȧȧz Rockit. It was released in 1987 on Roadrunner Records/Enigma Records.

== Track listing ==
Side A
No.	Title	Length
1.	"Demolition"	1:14
2.	"Last Breath"	4:37
3.	"Euroshima"	3:52
4.	"Most Dangerous Game"	6:10
5.	"Shot to Hell"	3:57

Side B
No.	Title	Length
6.	"Say Goodbye M.F."	4:14
7.	"Self Destruct"	5:37
8.	"Means to an End"	4:47
9.	"I'm Electric"	3:03
10.	"Mad Axe Attack" (Instrumental)	2:13
11.	"Shit's Ugly" (Instrumental)	1:47
Total length:		41:21

1990 Japanese edition bonus tracks
No.	Title	Length
1.	"Euroshima" (live)
2.	"Spared from the Fire" (live)

== Notes ==
- The 2005 re-issue by Old Metal Records contains the 1983 demo Prelude to Death after a two-minute silence on "Shit's Ugly"
- The 2009 re-issue by Massacre Records contains a DVD of the band's live show in Eindhoven on April 20, 1986

== Credits ==
- Michael Coons – vocals
- Aaron Jellum – guitars
- Phil Kettner – guitars
- Willy Lange – bass
- Victor Agnello – drums

Guest musician

- Scott Singer – keyboards, programming

Guest musician

- Jeff Sadowski – album concept, artwork
- Jeff Weller – album concept, executive producer
- Patrick Pending – art direction
- Robert Janover – photography
- Roy Rowland – producer, engineering
- Eddy Schreyer – mastering
- Keith Madigan – photography
- Neil Zlozower – photography
- Kay Arbuckle – engineering (assistant)
