= Left for Dead (Lȧȧz Rockit album) =

Studio album by Lȧȧz Rockit
- Released: July 25, 2008
- Recorded: 2007–2008
- Studio: Trident Studios, Pacheco, California, USA
- Genre: Thrash metal
- Label: Massacre

Lȧȧz Rockit chronology
Nothing's Sacred (1991)	Left for Dead (2008)

Professional ratings
Review scores
Source	Rating
Terrorizer	(Nov 2008)

Left for Dead is the sixth studio album by American thrash metal band Lȧȧz Rockit. It was released on July 25, 2008 on Massacre Records and follows 1991's Nothing's Sacred. It is the band's only album since 1989 to feature the original line-up, apart from new drummer Sky Harris, and their final album with bassist Willy Lange before his death 10 years later. It's also the first studio album in 17 years and the most recent to date.

== Track listing ==
No.	Title	Writer(s)	Length
1.	"Brain Wash"		3:34
2.	"Delirium Void"		3:39
3.	"Erased"		3:47
4.	"My Euphoria"	Scott Sargeant	3:53
5.	"Ghost in the Mirror"		4:47
6.	"Turmoil"		5:25
7.	"Liar"		4:39
8.	"Desolate Oasis"		7:58
9.	"No Man"		3:31
10.	"Outro" (Instrumental)		8:25
Total length:			49:38

Limited edition bonus tracks
No.	Title	Length
1.	"Leatherface" (Live at Keep It True Festival 2007)	6:05
2.	"Prelude" (Live at Thrash Domination Festival 2005)	4:36
Total length:		60:19

Japanese edition bonus tracks
No.	Title	Length
1.	"Leatherface" (Live at Keep It True Festival 2007)	6:05
2.	"Prelude" (Live at Thrash Domination Festival 2005)	4:36
3.	"Fire in the Hole" (Live at Keep It True Festival 2007)	4:24
4.	"City's Gonna Burn" (Live at Thrash Domination Festival 2005)	5:09
Total length:		69:52

== Credits ==
- Michael Coons – lead vocals
- Aaron Jellum – guitars
- Phil Kettner – guitars
- Willy Lange – bass
- Sky Harris – drums

Production

- Juan Urteaga – producer, mixing, mastering
- Ace Cook – executive producer
- Scott Lee Sargeant – producer
- Mark DeVito – design, layout
- Aaron Jellum – co-producer
