= No Stranger to Danger (Lȧȧz Rockit album) =

Studio album by Lȧȧz Rockit
- Released: 1985
- Studios: Fiddler Studio, Hollywood, California
- Genres: Heavy metal, Power metal
- Length: 38:01
- Label: Target Records / Steamhammer Records
- Producer: Mark Whitaker

Lȧȧz Rockit chronology
City's Gonna Burn (1984)	No Stranger to Danger (1985)	Know Your Enemy (1987)

Professional ratings
Review scores
Source	Rating
Metal Forces	56/100
Rock Hard	7.0/10
Sounds	3.5/5 stars

No Stranger to Danger is the second studio album by American thrash metal band Lȧȧz Rockit. It was released in 1985 on Target Records in USA and Steamhammer Records in Europe.

== Track listing ==
All tracks are written by Lȧȧz Rockit.

Side A
No.	Title	Length
1.	"Dreams Die Hard"	4:41
2.	"I've Got Time"	4:41
3.	"Town to Town"	4:12
4.	"Backbreaker"	3:43

Side B
No.	Title	Length
1.	"Stand Alone"	4:21
2.	"Spared from the Fire"	4:26
3.	"Off the Deep End"	3:35
4.	"Tonight Alive"	3:38
5.	"Wrecking Machine"	4:44
Total length:		38:01

2009 Massacre Records remastered reissue CD bonus tracks
No.	Title	Length
1.	"Erased" (live at Fat City's "The New Year Evil Has Landed 08")	3:45
2.	"Prelude" (live at Fat City's "The New Year Evil Has Landed 08")	3:48
Total length:		45:36

== Credits ==
Lȧȧz Rockit

- Michael Coons – lead vocals, backing vocals
- Aaron Jellum – rhythm guitar, lead guitar, backing vocals
- Phil Kettner – rhythm guitar, lead guitar, acoustic guitar, backing vocals
- Willy Lange – bass, backing vocals
- Victor Agnello – drums, synthesizer

Production

- Mark Whitaker – producer, engineering
- Mark Leonard – executive producer
- Robert Biles – engineer
- Jeff Sanders – mastering engineer
- Chuck Rosa – mix-down engineer
- Peter McNulty – second engineer
- Neil Zlozower – photography
- Jeff Weller – design
- Elixabeth Stabholtz – stylist
