= Kill for Pleasure =

1987 debut album by Blood Feast

Studio album by Blood Feast
- Released: February 13, 1987
- Recorded: Waterfront Studios in Hoboken, NJ
- Genre: Thrash metal
- Length: 37:27
- Label: New Renaissance Records

Blood Feast chronology
| Suicidal Mission.... (1986) | Kill for Pleasure (1987) | Face Fate (1987) |

Professional ratings
Review scores
| Source | Rating |
|---|---|
| Allmusic | 2/5 stars |
| Kerrang! | 3.5/5 stars |

Kill for Pleasure is the debut album by Blood Feast. It was released on February 13, 1987, by New Renaissance Records.

== Track listing ==
1. "Menacing Thunder" – 4:31
2. "Kill for Pleasure" – 3:13
3. "Cannibal" – 4:55
4. "Vampire" – 5:14
5. "Suicidal Mission " – 5:04
6. "Venomous Death" – 3:59
7. "The Evil" – 3:30
8. "Darkside" – 3:55
9. "R.I.P" - 3:06

== Credits ==
- Gary Markovitch – vocals
- Mike Basden – guitar
- Kevin Kuzma – drums
- Adam Tranquilli – guitar
- Lou Starita – bass
