= Ticket to Mayhem =

Studio album by Whiplash
- Released: October 17, 1987
- Recorded: Morrisound Recording, Tampa, Florida
- Genre: Thrash metal
- Length: 37:31
- Label: Roadrunner
- Producer: Dan Johnson

Whiplash chronology
Power and Pain (1986)	Ticket to Mayhem (1987)	Insult to Injury (1989)

Professional ratings
Review scores
Source	Rating
AllMusic	3.5/5 stars

Ticket to Mayhem is the second studio album by American thrash metal band Whiplash. It was released on Roadrunner Records in October 1987 and follows 1986's Power and Pain. In 1989, the band released a follow-up album, Insult to Injury.

The opening and closing tracks, both called "Perpetual Warfare", are simply sound effects of guns, explosions, and fighter planes.

In 1998, Displeased Records rereleased Ticket to Mayhem and Power and Pain together on one CD.

== Track listing ==
All songs written by Tony Portaro, except where noted.

No.	Title	Length
1.	"Perpetual Warfare"	1:41
2.	"Walk the Plank" (Portaro, Joe Cangelosi)	4:23
3.	"Last Nail in the Coffin" (Portaro, Tony Bono)	4:30
4.	"Drowning in Torment" (Portaro, Cangelosi)	3:48
5.	"The Burning of Atlanta"	4:51
6.	"Eternal Eyes (Last Nail in the Coffin Part 2)" (Portaro, Bono)	3:20
7.	"Snake Pit"	3:52
8.	"Spiral of Violence"	5:44
9.	"Respect the Dead"	3:09
10.	"Perpetual Warfare"	1:38
Total length:		37:31

== Credits ==
Whiplash

- Tony Portaro – vocals, guitar
- Tony Bono – bass
- Joe Cangelosi – drums

Additional personnel

- Produced by Dan Johnson
- Engineered by Scott Burns
- Mixed by Dan Johnson and Jim Morris
- Mastered by Mike Fuller at Fullersound, Miami, Florida
