= Re-Animator (band) =

- Origin: Hull, East Riding of Yorkshire, England
- Genres: Thrash metal
- Years active: 1987–1993 2013–present
- Labels: Music for Nations
- Past members: Kevin Ingleson; Mike Abel; John Wilson; Mark Dennis; Lee Robinson; Graham Dixon; Adam Clark; Tony Calvert

Re-Animator is a British thrash metal band, which formed in Hull, East Riding of Yorkshire, England in 1987, broke up in 1993, and then re-formed in 2013.

== Early years ==
Re-animator was formed in 1987 by Mike Abel and Kevin Ingleson. Ingleson was a rhythm guitarist who had been an admirer of Abel's style of playing. They started to write some songs together – the first two were "Follow the Masses" and "Push the Button", which were on their first and only demo tape. The demos were recorded at Animal Tracks Recording Studio in Hull in March 1988, over two days. Abel and Ingleson were looking for a bass player and a drummer, and they asked Mark Dennis to drum on a demo tape. Tony Calvert agreed to do vocals but declined to join the band full-time, as he was involved in another band at the time. John Wilson then joined on bass guitar.

Re-Animator began playing gigs. One of their early ones was at the Frog & Toad in Bradford with Acid Reign. Both the bands hit it off, and Acid Reign asked for a demo tape. The tape found its way to Music for Nations who contacted the band and asked them to come to London and talk about contracts. Re-animator duly signed a record contract for three albums with Music For Nations. When the record label asked the group if they had plenty of other songs, the group stated "yes loads, we are ready to go" – but in reality they did not. In the car on the way home, they started writing the tracks that became the mini LP Deny Reality (1989).

== Discography ==
=== Studio releases ===
- Deny Reality (1989) (Mini LP)
- Condemned to Eternity (1990)
- Laughing (1990)
- That Was Then This Is Now (1992)
- One More War EP (2019)

=== Other releases / compilations ===
- Speed Kills 4 (1989)
- Metal Hammer’s Best of British Steel (1989)
- A History of a Time to Come

== TV appearances ==
- Granada TV, UK – Other Side of Midnight; 18 April 1989, presenter Tony H Wilson
- Mosh TV, Bochum, Germany, 1991 – With Exodus / Nuclear Assault

== Members ==
- Kev Ingleson – 1988–1992; 2013–present – lead vocals/lead/rhythm guitar
- Mike Abel – 1988–1993; 2013–2015 – lead/rhythm guitar/backing vocals
- John Wilson – 1988–1993; 2013–2018 – bass/backing vocals
- Mark Dennis – 1988–1993; 2013-2016 – drums/backing vocals
- Lee Robinson – 1992–1993 – vocals
- Graham Dixon – 1992–1993 – lead and rhythm guitar/backing vocals
- Adam Clark – 1993 – lead and rhythm guitar/vocals
- Tony Calvert – 1988 – Vocals
- Dan Murray – 2015–present – guitar/vocals
- Jamie "Jac" Cammish – 2016–present – drums
