= Epidemic (band) =

American band

- Origin: Palo Alto, California, United States
- Genres: Thrash metal Death metal
- Years active: 1987–1994
- Labels: Metalcore, Metal Blade, Divebomb, The Crypt
- Members: Carl Fulli; Mark Bodine; Erik Moggridge; Bobby Cochran
- Past members: Geoff Bruce; Guy Higbey; Ted Kamp

Epidemic was an American death/thrash metal band that was part of the Bay Area thrash scene.

== History ==
Bassist Mark Bodine, guitarist Guy Higbey, guitarist Erik Moggridge, and drummer Ted Kamp formed Epidemic in 1986 in Palo Alto for their high school senior night talent show, playing a cover of Metallica's "Creeping Death" and an original song called "No Man's Land". The quarted pursued the band full time, taking the Epidemic name from a Slayer song.

After recruiting drummer Geoff Bruce and vocalist Carl Fulli, the band entered a Battle of the Bands contest at the Mountain View Theater in September 1987. Having only recruited Fulli a couple of weeks prior, the inexperienced band had no expectations of winning. After the first night, the band reached the finals and won the competition the next night. The prize was an opening slot for Death Angel the following month.

The band recorded their first demo, Immortal Minority, in December 1987. Achieving minor success in the Bay Area and playing almost every thrash show at the Mountain View Theater, with the likes of Slayer, Exodus, Testament, Death Angel, D.R.I., etc. the band started to branch out further, playing shows at the Stone in San Francisco and the Omni in Oakland.

In the fall of 1988, Epidemic came to the conclusion that they needed a drummer with further advanced double kick skills and Bruce agreed to leave the band. They recruited Bobby Cochran, a longtime friend and former Punisher drummer, to take over duties. With this line-up, Epidemic went into Telluride Studios in Palo Alto to record their demo, "Demo '89". The band initially gave out 300 free demos after a Vio-lence show at the Omni and their popularity grew tremendously. The band sent out the demo to many magazines, radio stations and labels and created a name for themselves globally. The band estimates that they sold roughly 5,000-7,000 demos on their own over the next two years. During this time the band was able to headline venues on their own. Epidemic's first headline show at the Stone was filled at 90% capacity. They also reached agreement with Marco Barbieri, who years later would become the head of the label Century Media Records, to become their manager. In addition, a deal was reached with Metalcore Records in Europe for the release of "Demo '89" on CD and vinyl. It would be the first official CD released by the band under the title The Truth of What Will Be, though it was only released in Europe.

In January 1991, the band recorded another demo, titled "Extremities '91", which led to their signing of a record contract with Metal Blade Records. The band recorded their United States debut album, Decameron, at HOS studios in Palo Alto. The album was released in the summer of 1992. The band went on a two-week East Coast tour with Malevolent Creation and Suffocation in December 1992 to support it, and eight weeks later headed out on a nationwide tour with Cannibal Corpse and Unleashed in early 1993. Epidemic gained considerable exposure as well as experience, as this was what they thought was the beginning of their touring years.

After coming home from the tours the band focused on writing new material but asked Higbey to leave the band. This was a difficult decision for the band but they moved forward as a four-piece and continued to write and prepare for their next album. Entering Razor's Edge studios in San Francisco in the fall of 1993, the band recorded their album, Exit Paradise, which was released in October 1994. The band decided to break up a couple months after the release of this album due to differences in the band and the label's lack of support.

In 2011 Divebomb Records approached the band to release all of the band's demos (Immortal Minority-1988, Demo '89-1989, and Extremities '91-1991) as a single release on CD. The subsequent release called "Pandemic the Demo Anthology" was released in the summer of 2012.

In 2014 the band was notified that a label from Massachusetts called The Crypt acquired the rights to license the band's first album for Metal Blade, Decameron, and will release it on gate fold vinyl in the first half of 2015.

== Band members ==
=== Last line-up ===
- Carl Fulli - vocals (1987–1994)
- Erik Moggridge - guitar (1987–1994)
- Mark Bodine - bass (1987–1994)
- Bobby Cochran - drums (1988–1994)

=== Former members ===
- Guy Higbey - guitar (1987–1993)
- Ted Kamp - drums (1987)
- Geoff Bruce - drums (1987–1988)

== Discography ==
=== Studio albums ===
- The Truth of What Will Be (1990) Metalcore Records
- Decameron (1992) Metal Blade Records
- Lament (1994) (7-inch) Metal Blade Records
- Exit Paradise (1994) Metal Blade Records
- Pandemic: The Demo Anthology (2012) Divebomb Records

=== Demos ===
- Immortal Minority (1988)
- Demo '89 (1989)
- Extremities '91 (1991)
