= Product of Imagination =

Studio album by Paradox
- Released: October 1987
- Recorded: May–June 1987 at Karo Studio, Münster, Germany
- Genre: Thrash metal, speed metal, power metal
- Length: 39:39
- Label: Roadrunner Records
- Producer: Kalle Trapp

Paradox chronology
Product of Imagination (1987)	Heresy (1989)

Product of Imagination is the debut album of the German thrash metal band Paradox. It was released in 1987 through Roadrunner Records.

Product of Imagination was reissued by the German label High Vaultage Records in 1999, containing four bonus tracks. The album was reissued again on 13 August 2007 by Metal Mind Productions from Poland as a digipack. This reissue was released as a golden disc with only 2000 items ever produced. It featured bonus tracks along with every song on the album being digitally remastered using a 24-Bit process.

== Background ==
Paradox was formed in 1986 by vocalist and guitarist Charly Steinhauer and drummer Axel Blaha. The band added guitarist Markus Spyth and bassist Roland Stahl to their lineup in February of that same year. Now having a complete lineup, Paradox recorded a demo in the same year that began to attract the attention of Roadrunner Records, but it would be the Mystery demo released in 1987 that would be the first major breakthrough for the band. The demo was voted "The Demo of the Year" in a number of magazines and, according to Steinhauer, "That demo was the reason Roadrunner Records asked us for a possible collaboration." After obtaining their deal with Roadrunner, Paradox began to record Product of Imagination at Karo Studio in May 1987 with producer Kalle Trapp.

== Touring ==
Paradox supported the release of their debut by performing in numerous live shows across Europe. They played shows with a variety of notable artists, including Helloween, Overkill, and Tankard. The band also made an appearance at the Dynamo Open Air festival in 1988. Steinhauer considered the band's performance here to be a highlight of his career, "For young musicians like us, it was like we were suddenly big rock stars. We shared the stage with our favorite band, Exodus, in front of 22,000 metal bangers... This show is actually in my personal hall of fame. Sometimes we had tears in our eyes when we thought how lucky we were, and if it was really true what had happened for us. I remember, before we started playing, I shouted to Axel, 'hey...we made it! Now we are a big name. Look at all these people who came to see us playing live'".

== Reception ==
Professional ratings
Review scores
Source	Rating
AllMusic	3/5 stars
Sea of Tranquility	3.5/5 stars
Rock Hard	9/10

Product of Imagination was generally well received and praised by the media following its release in October 1987. It was voted "LP of the month" in the magazines Rock Hard and Metal Hammer, the latter of which claimed that the album was the best German debut since Helloween's Walls of Jericho. The album was also given high scores in the English magazine Kerrang! and also in Japan's Burrn!. After the release of their debut, Paradox was named "Newcomer #1" by the press in Germany. The band was also ranked as the third best band in Germany in polls conducted by the German editions of Rock Hard and Metal Hammer, being ranked below the Scorpions and Accept.

Pete Pardo of Sea of Tranquility described the album as featuring "thrashy guitar riffs, blinding solos, a mix of gruff & melodic high pitched vocals, and pounding rhythms". Pardo praised guitarist Markus Spyth's work on the songs "Continuation of Invasion", "Mystery", "Paradox", and "Product of Imagination". Allmusic reviewer Eduardo Rivadavia awarded the album three stars out of five, also praising the guitar work throughout the album and suggesting that the band as a whole was "an incredibly cohesive and taut unit". However, Rivadavia did suggest that the album "suffers from wild inconsistencies of tone, dynamics, and quality", leading him to believe that "maybe Paradox weren't quite ready to record, but rather were hurriedly cobbling songs together throughout the album's sessions".

== Track listing ==
Original track listing
No.	Title	Length
1.	"Opening Theme" (instrumental)	1:24
2.	"Paradox"	4:16
3.	"Death, Screaming and Pain"	5:09
4.	"Product of Imagination"	7:15
5.	"Continuation of Invasion" (instrumental)	2:13
6.	"Mystery"	5:05
7.	"Kill That Beast"	4:27
8.	"Pray to the Godz of Wrath"	4:44
9.	"Beyond Space"	4:48
10.	"Wotan II"	0:18

1999 reissue bonus tracks
No.	Title	Length
11.	"Paradox" (live)	4:17
12.	"Death Screaming and Pain" (live)	4:58
13.	"Execution" (live)	3:17
14.	"Pray to the Gods of Wrath" (demo)	5:44

2007 reissue bonus tracks
No.	Title	Length
11.	"Paradox" (live)	4:17
12.	"Death Screaming and Pain" (live)	4:58
13.	"Execution" (live)	3:17
14.	"Pray to the Gods of Wrath" (demo)	5:44
15.	"Paradox" (live video)

== Personnel ==
- Charly Steinhauer – vocals, guitar
- Markus Spyth – guitar
- Roland Stahl – bass
- Axel Blaha – drums
