= Paradox (German band) =

German thrash/speed metal band

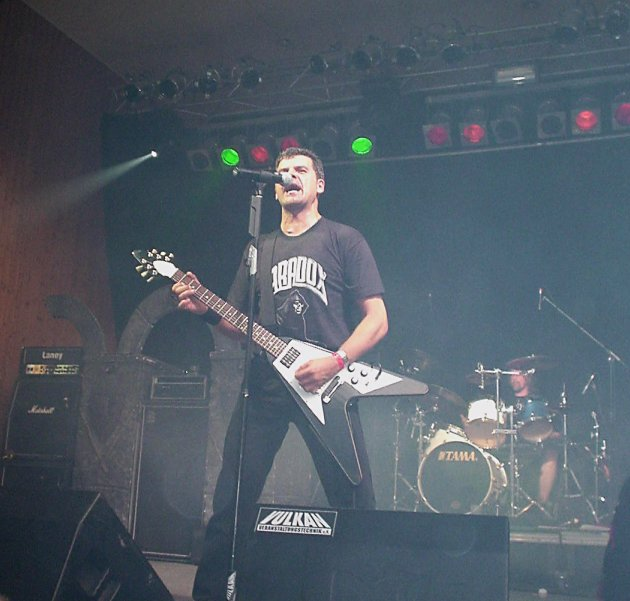
- Singer Charly Steinhauer at the "Keep It True Festival VI" 2006

Background information
- Origin: Würzburg, Germany
- Genres: Thrash metal, speed metal, power metal
- Years active: 1986–1991, 1998–present
- Label: AFM Records
- Members: Charly Steinhauer; Tilen Hudrap; Kostas Milonas; Gus Drax

Paradox is a German thrash metal/speed metal band formed in Würzburg in 1986.

== History ==
The group was formed in Würzburg in 1986 by Charly Steinhauer and Axel Blaha. Both founded German cover bands of Overkill, Venom and Warhead in 1981. In February 1986, Markus Spyth joined on guitar and Roland Stahl on bass.

In July 1986, the band recorded a demo. Roadrunner Records produced their first two albums. In 1987, their second demo, Mystery, was a success; the German press called it the best demo of the year. That year, the band started recording their first album, the 10-song, 40-minute Product of Imagination. It was a success in Germany. Metal Hammer named it the best German debut after Walls of Jericho by Helloween.

A year before releasing their second album, Roland Stahl left the band to be replaced by Matthias 'Kater' Schmitt. Shortly afterwards, Spyth left the band and was replaced by Dieter Roth. In November 1989, Paradox released their second album, Heresy. The international acclaim the album received helped Paradox attain a worldwide fanbase. In 1990, Spyth was replaced by Kai Pasemann. From this year on, the band remained on hold for personal reasons, and continuing line-up changes did not help their activity.

The band was inactive for almost ten years. In 1998, Charly Steinhauer had plans to reform Paradox. The new line-up featured Kai Pasemann on guitar and brothers Oliver and Alex Holzwarth on bass and drums respectively. In May 2000, Paradox signed with AFM Records and released their third album Collision Course. Once again the album received positive reviews. After this album, the band again went on hiatus, this time because Steinhauer contracted a serious intestinal disease. In September 2005, he again reassembled the band, with Roland Jahoda on drums and Olly Keller on bass.

In January 2008, Paradox released their fourth album, Electrify, which became a success especially in Japan.

In October 2009, the band released its fifth album, Riot Squad, the album's main themes concerning the problems and violence present in civilization. The artwork was designed by Italian/Chilean artist Claudio Bergamin who had also created the artwork for Electrify. In December 2012, they released Tales of the Weird.

In late 2013, Paradox began working on their seventh album, which was revealed to be a concept album and a sequel to the band's 1989 album Heresy. However, the band stated on their Facebook page that their new album was not going to be called Heresy II; instead it was titled Pangea. Slovenian bass player Tilen Hudrap joined the band in 2015 and recorded the bass for Pangea. The album was released in June 2016 and received great reviews all over the world.

Paradox's eighth studio album, and the long-awaited sequel to Heresy, titled Heresy II – End of a Legend, was released in September 2021. Their next album, Mysterium, was released on 26 September 2025.

== Members ==
Current members

- Charly Steinhauer — vocals (1986–1991, 1998–present); rhythm guitar (1986–1991, 1998–present); lead guitar, bass, drums (2024–present)

Former members

- Axel Blaha — drums (1986–1991, 2016–2023; until his death)
- Roland Stahl — bass (1986–1988, 1998–1999, 2016–2020)
- Jochen Glöggler — lead guitar (1986)
- Markus Spyth — lead guitar (1986–1989, 1998–1999, 2016–2020)
- Armin Donderer — bass (1988, 1989–1990, 2002–2005)
- Matthias Schmitt — bass, backing vocals (1988–1989)
- Dieter Roth — lead guitar (1989, session only)
- Kai Pasemann — lead guitar, backing vocals (1989–1991, 1999–2002, 2002–2010)
- Stefan Haller — lead vocals (1989–1990)
- Joe DiBiase — bass (1990–1991)
- Klaus Lohmeyer — bass (1991)
- Udo Klein — drums (1998–1999)
- Oliver Holzwarth — bass (1999–2002, 2011–2012)
- Alex Holzwarth — drums (1999–2002, 2011–2012)
- Stefan Schwarzmann — drums, backing vocals (2002–2005)
- Fabian Schwarz — lead guitar (2005–2006)
- Andi Siegl — bass (2005–2006)
- Chris Weiss — drums (2005–2006)
- Olly Keller — bass (2007–2011, 2012–2013, 2020–2024)
- Roland Jahoda — drums (2007–2010, 2010–2011)
- Gus Drax — lead guitar (2010–2011, 2014–2016)
- Christian Münzner — lead guitar (2012–2014, 2020–2024)
- Daniel "Evil Ewald" Buld — drums (2012–2014)
- Tommy Kittsteiner Calvanese — bass (2013–2014)
- Kostas Milonas — drums (2015–2016)
- Tilen Hudrap — bass (2015–2016)

== Discography ==
=== Studio albums ===
- Product of Imagination (1987)
- Heresy (1989)
- Collision Course (2000)
- Electrify (2008)
- Riot Squad (2009)
- Tales of the Weird (2012)
- Pangea (2016)
- Heresy II – End of a Legend (2021)
- Mysterium (2025)

=== Demos ===
- Mystery (1987)
