= Carnivore (band) =

American crossover thrash band

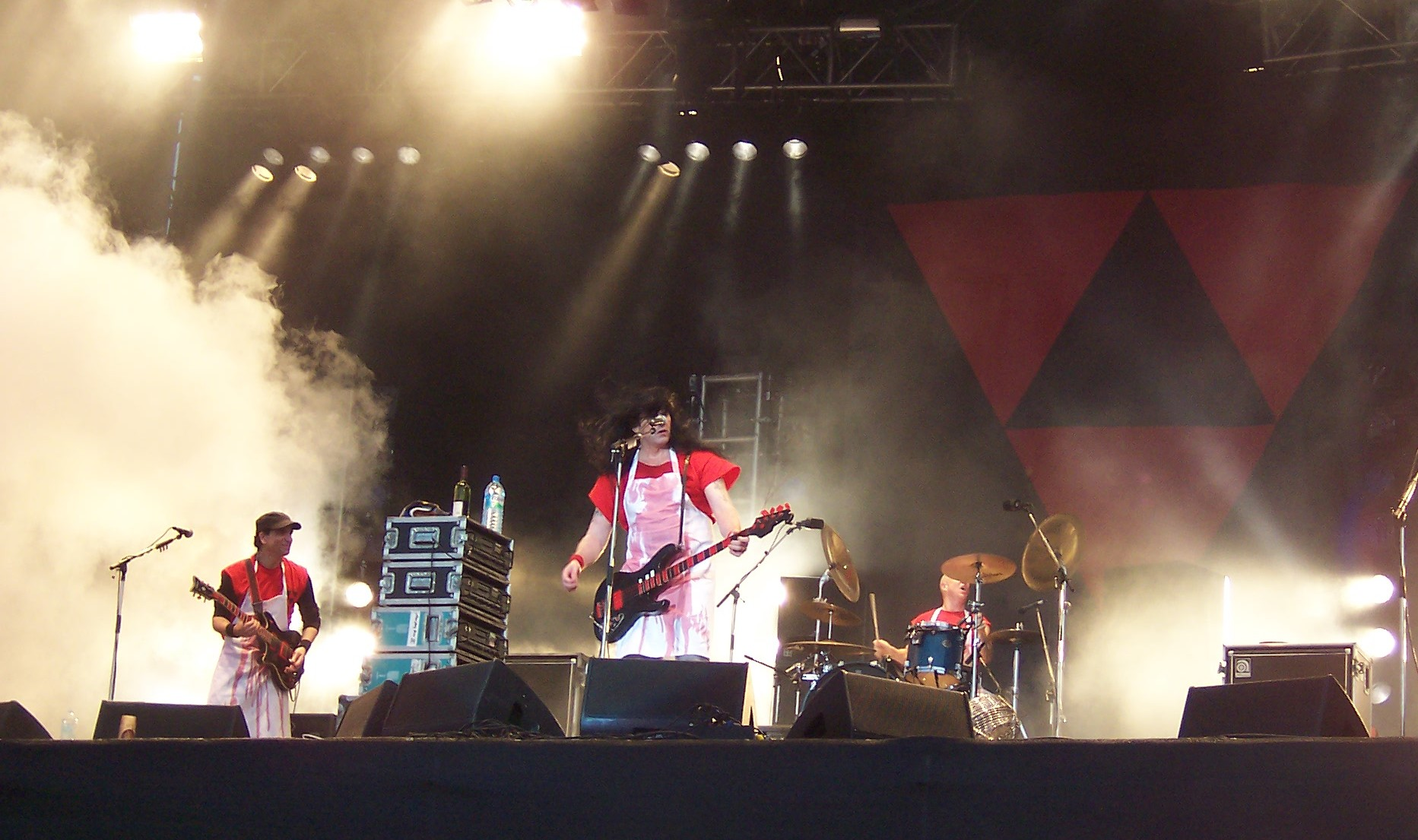
- Carnivore at Wacken Open Air 2006

Background information
- Also known as: Disciple (1982); Carnivore A.D. (2017–present)
- Origin: Brooklyn, New York, United States
- Genres: Crossover thrash; thrash metal
- Years active: 1982–1987, 1994–1996, 2006–2010, 2017–present
- Label: Roadrunner
- Spinoffs: Type O Negative
- Spinoff of: Fallout
- Members: Baron Misuraca; Chuck Lenihan; Joe Cangelosi
- Past members: Marc Piovanetti; Peter Steele; Louie Beato; Keith Alexander; Stan Pillis; Paul Bento; Steve Tobin; Joey Z.; Joe Branciforte

Carnivore is an American crossover thrash band from Brooklyn, New York. It was founded by singer and bassist Peter Steele out of the breakup of the heavy metal band Fallout in 1982. The original lineup consisted of Steele, guitarist Stan Pillis, and drummer Louie Beato. Carnivore broke up in 1987, and several versions of the band have reformed since then, though no original members remain in the group as of 2026.

== History ==
Carnivore released their self-titled debut album Carnivore in November 1985. For this album, the band spelled their names in what they thought were "exotic" ways, Petrus T. Steele and Louie Beateaux. The band often dressed as warriors in torn clothing and spikes attached to hockey gear during their live shows at this period. Keith Alexander left the band in 1986 because he was not interested in the new crossover direction of the band, and was replaced by Marc Piovanetti, who later joined Crumbsuckers. In September 1987, they released their second album, Retaliation. Soon after their second album was released, the band broke up and Peter Steele formed a new band called Repulsion, which would later be renamed Type O Negative. According to the sleeve notes of the "Top Shelf Edition" of their second album, the first Type O Negative album, Slow, Deep and Hard was composed largely from material originally written for Carnivore. Peter Steele and Marc Piovanetti would not appear together on a release again until the compilation Songs of the Witchblade: A Soundtrack to the Comic Book in 1998.

=== Reformation and second break-up ===
Despite being disbanded for many years, the band was reactivated on several occasions, including several reunion shows in the mid 1990s with the Retaliation lineup, and an appearance at the 1996 Milwaukee Metalfest, plus several shows from 2006 to 2007 with a new four-piece lineup. The new lineup of the band performed at the Wacken Open Air in 2006.

Peter Steele died April 14, 2010, thus ending the reunion.

=== Carnivore A.D. ===
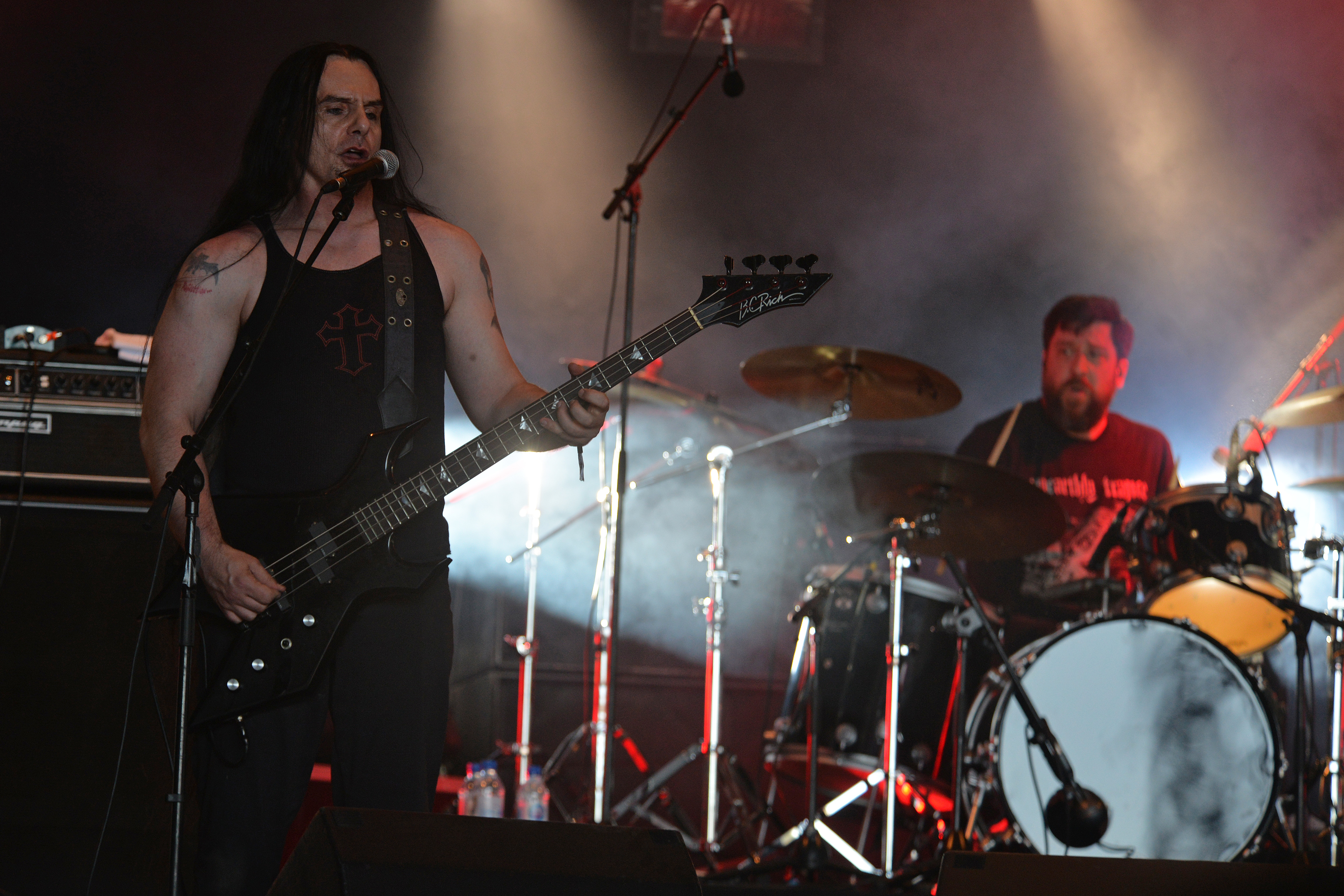
Carnivore A.D. at Hellfest 2018

In August 2017, it was announced that Carnivore would officially be reformed as Carnivore A.D., featuring original drummer Louie Beato and guitarist Marc Piovanetti along with secondary drummer Joe Branciforte sharing drum duties and also introducing new member Baron Misuraca as the bassist/vocalist.

After a live performance at the 2017 Black N Blue Bowl pre-party in May, Piovanetti announced that the group would reform out of great respect to Peter Steele's legacy while simultaneously distinguishing themselves from past incarnations of the band. They played their first show with Misuraca on October 31 at Bowery Electric in New York City dubbed "A Halloween SteeleTacular". The band then made their live festival debut at the 2018 edition of Hellfest.

On January 29, 2026, the band announced they would be releasing their first ever EP, Transmutation, on March 27.

== Musical style and influences ==
Greg Prato of AllMusic described Carnivore's sound as "much more straight-ahead thrash metal than Steele's future goth outfit Type O Negative."

The first Carnivore album was heavily influenced by the contemporary New York hardcore scene. It also drew inspiration from Black Sabbath and early Judas Priest, whereas the second album had significant crossover influences. The 'post-apocalyptic' theme that dominated the first album and was carried onto parts of the second album was apparently inspired by a dream Pete Steele had and which became the basis for the lyrics of "Predator", the first song from the original album. The lyrical theme was then expanded on to describe human society (or the lack of one) between imaginary World Wars 3, 4, and possibly 5 (as referenced in the song "World Wars 3 & 4"). Other lyrical themes included nihilism, anti-religious sentiment, cynicism, and explicit-but-tongue-in-cheek depictions of gore and despair. Song titles such as "Jesus Hitler", "Race War", "Thermonuclear Warrior", and "God Is Dead" reflect these themes.

== Band members ==
Current members

- Baron Misuraca – bass, lead vocals (2017–present)
- Chuck Lenihan – guitars (2019–present)
- Joe Cangelosi – drums (2021–present)

Former members

- Peter Steele − bass, lead vocals (1982–1987, 1994–1996, 2006–2010; his death)
- Stan Pillis − guitars (1982–1983; died 2026)
- Louie Beato – drums, backing vocals (1982–1987, 1994–1996, 2017–2022)
- Keith Alexander – guitars, backing vocals (1983–1986; died 2005)
- Marc Piovanetti – guitars, backing vocals (1987, 1994–1996, 2017–2019)
- Paul Bento − guitars (2006–2010)
- Steve Tobin − drums (2006–2010)
- Joey Z. − guitars (2006–2010)
- Joe Branciforte – drums (2017–2020)

== Discography ==
=== Studio albums ===
- Carnivore (1985)
- Retaliation (1987)

=== EPs ===
- Transmutation (2026) (as Carnivore A.D.)

=== Compilation albums ===
- Retaliation / Carnivore (1991)

=== Demo albums ===
- "Nuclear Warriors" Demo (1984)
- "U.S.A. for U.S.A." (1986)

=== Singles ===
- "Carnivore" (1984)
- "Predator" (1985)
