= List of groove metal bands =

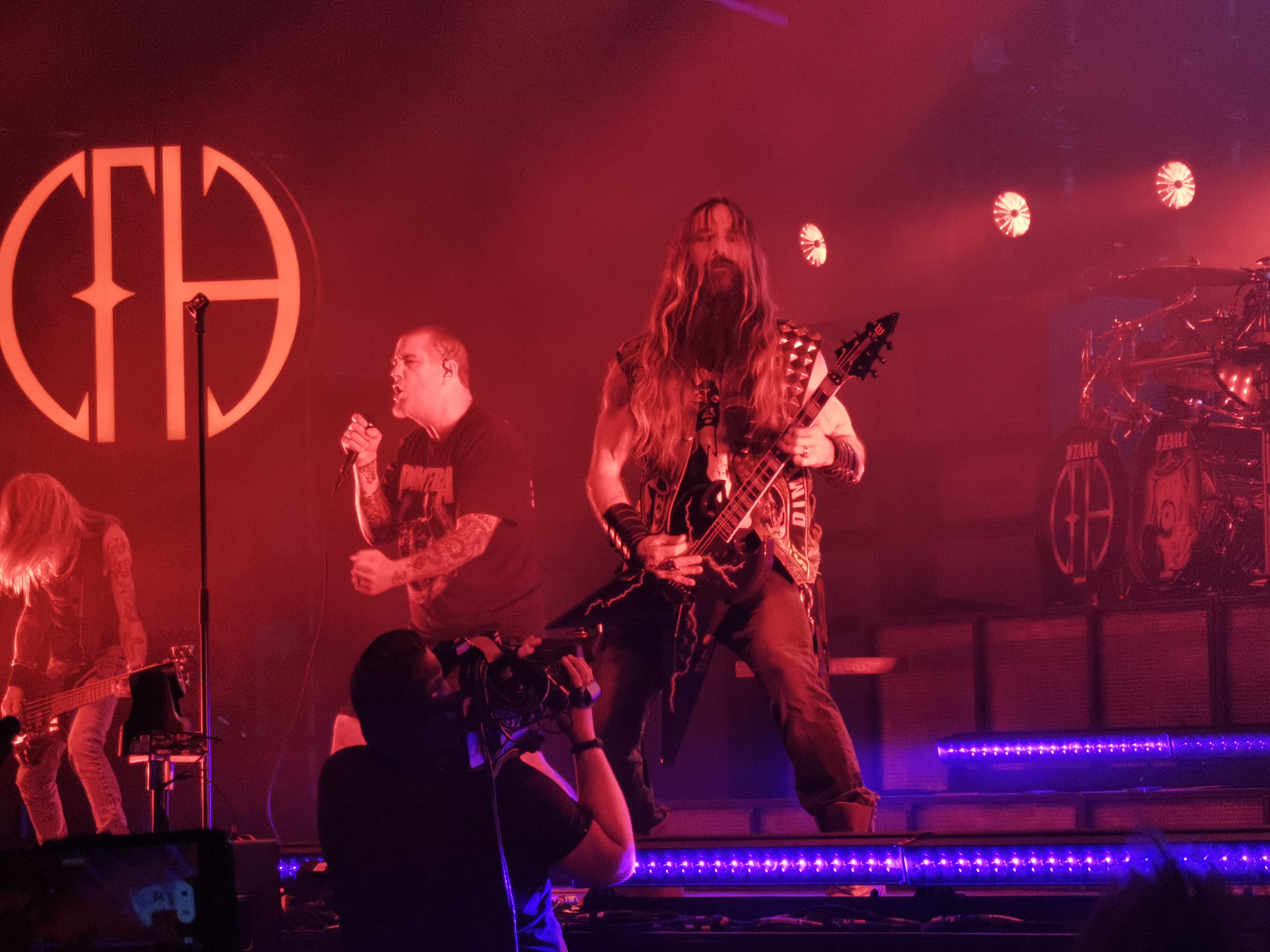
Pantera is widely credited with popularizing the groove metal genre.

The following is a list of bands that either were, are or have been associated with the genre groove metal. Groove metal is a subgenre of heavy metal music that began in the early 1990s. The genre is primarily derived from thrash metal, but played in slower tempos, and making use of rhythmic guitar parts.

== Artists ==
=== Groove metal as a primary genre ===
Artists that play groove metal primarily.

- Alien Weaponry
- A.N.I.M.A.L.
- A Perfect Murder
- Bad Wolves
- Betzefer
- Bewized
- Bhayanak Maut
- Biomechanical
- Black Label Society
- Brotality
- B-Thong
- Butcher Babies
- Byzantine
- Cavalera Conspiracy
- Channel Zero
- Chimaira
- Cocobat
- Confess
- Contrive
- Dagoba
- Damageplan
- Death Therapy
- De La Tierra
- DevilDriver
- Devilment
- Diablo
- Dirge Within
- Droid
- Ektomorf
- Exhorder
- Extrema
- Face Down
- Fear Factory
- Fight
- Five Finger Death Punch
- Frankenbok
- Gojira
- Grip Inc.
- G/Z/R
- Haji's Kitchen
- Hämatom
- Hamlet
- Hellyeah
- Hemlock
- Icon in Me
- Incite
- Killer Be Killed
- Kill II This
- Lamb of God
- Lazarus A.D.
- Machine Head
- Misterer
- Mud Factory
- Nu-Nation
- Odd Crew
- Omega Diatribe
- Orbit Culture
- Painflow
- Pantera
- Phenomy
- Pissing Razors
- Pitch Black Forecast
- Plan 4
- Powersurge
- Profane Omen
- Prong
- Pro-Pain
- RAMP
- Sawthis
- Segression
- Sepultura
- Shepherds Reign
- The Showdown
- Skinlab
- Solution 13
- Soulfly
- Souls at Zero
- Stampin' Ground
- STEMM
- Tendencia
- Ten Tonne Dozer
- Terror Syndrome
- Terror Universal
- Texas Hippie Coalition
- Throwdown
- Torque
- Toxicon
- Transport League
- Trials
- The Tug Fork River Band
- White Zombie

=== Groove metal as secondary genre ===
Artists that play groove metal as a secondary genre or include elements of groove metal into their sound, or have had groove metal albums in the past.

- Accuser
- Acid Drinkers
- Acrassicauda
- Adrenaline Mob
- A Life Once Lost
- Anthrax
- Arkaea
- Avatar
- Atrocity
- AxeWound
- Biohazard
- Bleed from Within
- Bleed the Sky
- Bloodred Hourglass
- Bloodsimple
- Body Count
- Brujeria
- Burgerkill
- Carajo
- City of Fire
- Coldseed
- Common Dead
- Criminal
- Cultura Tres
- Cyclone Temple
- CyHra
- Cypecore
- Dååth
- Decapitated
- Demolition Hammer
- Demon Hunter
- Dire
- Divine Heresy
- Dominus
- Doomsday Hymn
- Down for Life
- Dry Kill Logic
- Dying Fetus
- Earth Crisis
- Entombed
- Eths
- Exodus
- Eye of the Enemy
- Farmer Boys
- Flawed by Design
- Forbidden
- Forever Never
- Gizmachi
- Grimaze
- Hacktivist
- The Haunted
- Horcas
- Infected Rain
- Invocator
- Jinjer
- Jungle Rot
- Kayser
- Killers
- Kittie
- Klank
- Lions at the Gate
- Living Sacrifice
- Lost Society
- Malevolence
- Malón
- Mary Beats Jane
- Massacre
- Master
- Memorain
- Merauder
- Meshuggah
- Metal Allegiance
- Mnemic
- Morgana Lefay
- Mortification
- Mudvayne
- Nailbomb
- Neo-Destruction
- Nonpoint
- No Sin Evades His Gaze
- Obliveon
- Oceanhoarse
- Once Human
- Oni
- Outrage A.D.
- Overkill
- Product of Hate
- Psychostick
- Raunchy
- The Raven Age
- Rise of the Northstar
- Sacred Reich
- Sinsaenum
- Slipknot
- Spoil Engine
- The Southern Blacklist
- Stonegard
- Stuck Mojo
- Sybreed
- Threat Signal
- Thy Will Be Done
- Tonic Breed
- Twitching Tongues
- Upon a Burning Body
- Vicious Rumors
- Vimic
- Vision of Disorder
- Volbeat
- Whitechapel
- XIII Minutes

== See also ==
- List of thrash metal bands
- List of crossover thrash bands
- List of industrial metal bands
- List of metalcore bands
- List of nu metal bands
