= List of thrash metal bands =

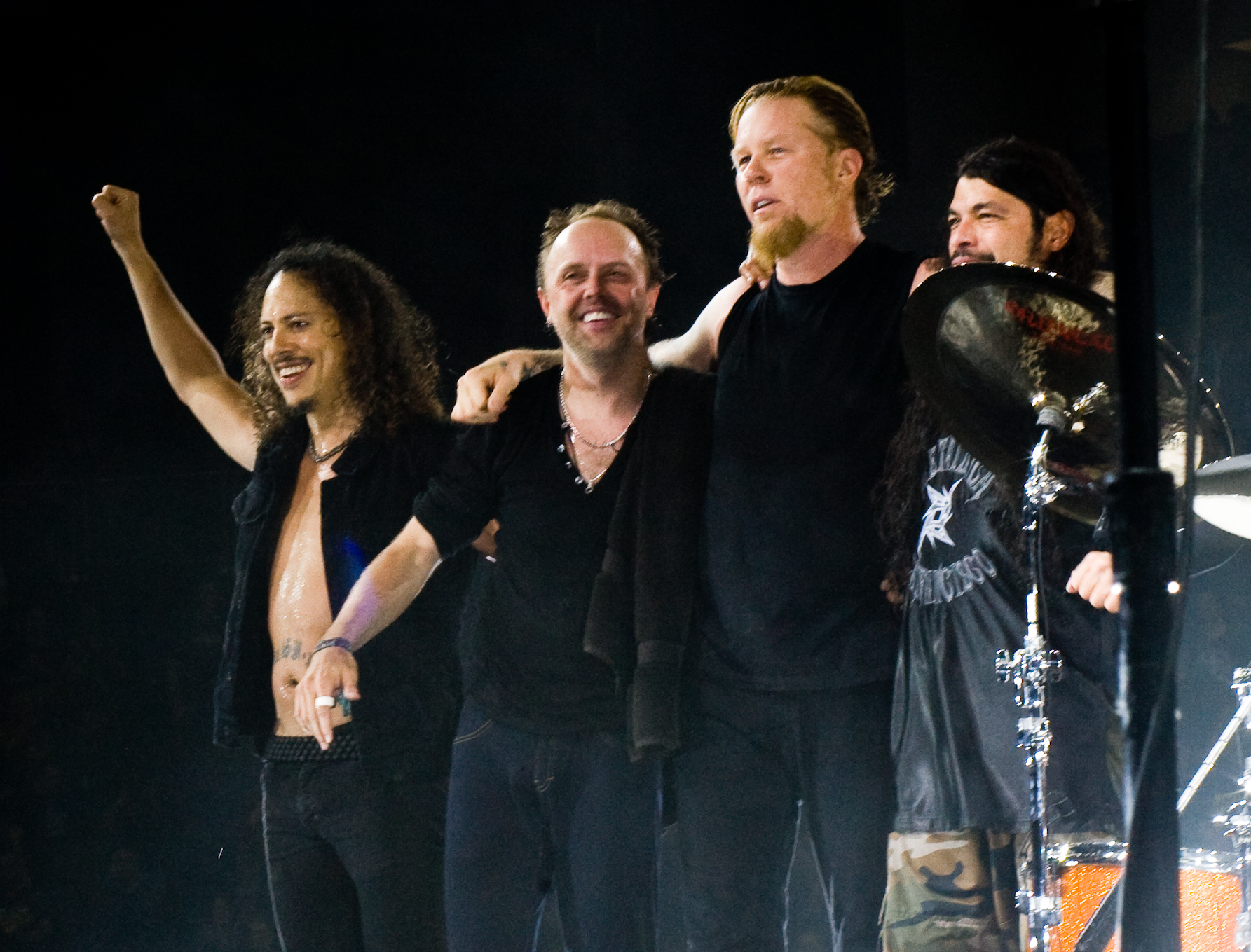
Metallica were part of the Bay Area thrash metal scene and hugely influential on the genre as a whole.

Various bands have played thrash metal at some point of their career. The genre evolved in the early 1980s from combining the drum beats of hardcore punk with the guitar style of the new wave of British heavy metal. It emerged partially as a reaction to the more conventional and widely acceptable glam metal, a less aggressive, pop music-infused heavy metal subgenre which appeared simultaneously.

Four American bands, Anthrax, Megadeth, Metallica, and Slayer, are credited with popularizing the genre, earning them the title of the "Big Four of Thrash". In Germany, Destruction, Kreator, Sodom, and Tankard, led the Teutonic thrash metal scene, garnering the nickname "The Big Four of Teutonic Thrash". The Clash of the Titans tour, which featured Megadeth, Slayer, Anthrax, Testament, and Suicidal Tendencies, is considered to be the genre's pinnacle, after which thrash metal saw a decline in popularity throughout the 1990s. Thrash metal has seen a resurgence in recent times, with many of the older bands returning to their roots with their new releases. A new generation of thrash metal bands emerged in the early 2000s, drawing lyrical and visual inspiration from the older groups.

Thrash metal was an inspiration for later extreme genres such as death metal and black metal. This list also includes certain bands which belong to the first wave of black metal. These bands essentially played thrash metal with a heavy emphasis on Satanic and occult themes in the lyrics and imagery. Over the years, thrash metal has developed a few subgenres of its own, such as crossover thrash and groove metal.

== A ==
Band	Formed	Origin	Note	
Acid Drinkers	1986	Poland		Tomasz "Titus" Pukacki of Acid Drinkers
Acid Reign	1985	United Kingdom		
Accuser	1986	Germany		
Acrassicauda	2001	Iraq		
Aftermath	1985	United States		
Agent Steel	1984	United States		
Am I Blood	1992	Finland		
Amorphia	2012	India		
Anacrusis	1986	United States		
Angel Dust	1984	Germany		Angel Dust, 2018
Angel of Sodom	2009	Finland		
Angelus Apatrida	2000	Spain		
Angkor Wat	1986	United States		
A.N.I.M.A.L.	1993	Argentina		
Annihilator	1984	Canada		Jeff Waters and Dave Padden of Annihilator at Wacken Open Air, 2013
Anthrax	1981	United States		Anthrax at Wacken Open Air, 2013
Artillery	1982	Denmark		Artillery, 2010
Atomkraft	1979	United Kingdom		
Atrophy	1986	United States		
Aura Noir	1993	Norway		Aura Noir at Inferno Festival, Oslo, 2011
Austrian Death Machine	2008	United States		

== B ==
Band	Formed	Origin	Note	
Bathory	1983	Sweden		
Battlecross	2003	United States		Battlecross at Rock im Park festival, 2014
Believer	1986	United States		
Bio-Cancer	2010	Greece		
Black Obelisk (Russian: Чёрный обелиск)	1986	Russia		
Blind Illusion	1978	United States		
Blood Feast	1985	United States		
Bloodstain	2023	Sweden		
Blood Tsunami	2004	Norway		Pete Evil of Blood Tsunami, London, 2007
Body Count	1990	United States		Ice-T with Body Count, Prague, 2006
Bonded by Blood	2005	United States		
Brotality	2016	United States		
Bulldozer	1980	Italy		Alberto Contini of Bulldozer at Tuska Open Air, 2011
Bullet for My Valentine	1998	United Kingdom		
Byzantine	2000	United States		

== C ==
Band	Formed	Origin	Note	
Carnal Forge	1997	Sweden		Carnal Forge, 2009
Carnivore	1982	United States		Carnivore at Wacken Open Air, 2006
Celtic Frost	1984	Switzerland		Celtic Frost at Tuska Open Air, 2006
Cerebral Fix	1986	United Kingdom		
Channel Zero	1990	Belgium		
Coroner	1983	Switzerland		
Crash	1991	South Korea		
Criminal	1991	Chile		Anton Reisenegger of Criminal, live in 2013.
Cripper	2005	Germany		
Crumbsuckers	1982	United States		Crumbsuckers album rehearsal, 1989
Cryptic Shift	2013	United Kingdom		
Cryptic Slaughter	1984	United States		
Cyclone Temple	1989	United States		

== D ==
Band	Formed	Origin	Note	
Darkane	1998	Sweden		Darkane lineup
Dark Angel	1981	United States		Ron Rinehart of Dark Angel, 2014
Dead Brain Cells	1986	Canada		
Death Angel	1982	United States		Death Angel at Sauna Open Air, Tampere, Finland, 2010
Deceased	1984	United States		
Defiance	1985	United States		
Defleshed	1991	Sweden		
Deliverance	1985	United States		
Demiricous	2001	United States		
Demolition Hammer	1986	United States		
Desaster	1988	Germany		
Deströyer 666	1994	Australia		Deströyer 666 at Hole in the Sky, 2007
Destruction	1982	Germany		Destruction at Festival AlternaVigo, 2009
Dew-Scented	1992	Germany		
Dorsal Atlântica	1981	Brazil		
Dorso	1984	Chile		
D.R.I.	1982	United States		
Dust Bolt	2007	Germany		Dust Bolt at Rockharz Open Air 2016

== E ==
Band	Formed	Origin	Note	
Early Man	2003	United States		Early Man, 2007
Embodyment	1993	United States		
English Dogs	1981	United Kingdom		
Epidemic	1986	United States		
Eudoxis	1984	Canada		
Evildead	1987	United States		
Evile	2004	United Kingdom		Evile, Madrid, 2008
Exciter	1978	Canada		
Exhorder	1985	United States		Exhorder at Turok Open Air in Germany, 2018
Exodus	1979	United States		Exodus, 2012
The Exploited	1978	United Kingdom		The Exploited in 2018
Extol	1993	Norway		
Extrema	1986	Italy		
Exumer	1985	Germany		

== F ==
Band	Formed	Origin	Note	
Flotsam and Jetsam	1981	United States		Jason Ward of Flotsam and Jetsam at Metalmania, 2008
Forbidden	1985	United States		
Forced Entry	1983	United States		

== G ==
Band	Formed	Origin	Note	
Gama Bomb	2002	Northern Ireland		
Generation Kill	2008	United States		
Ghoul	2001	United States		
God Forbid	1996	United States		God Forbid at The Hague, The Netherlands, 2009
Grinder	1987	Germany		
Gwar	1984	United States		Gwar at Arena Joondalup, 2010

== H ==
Band	Formed	Origin	Note	
Hämatom	2004	Germany		Hämatom at Rockharz Open Air 2019
Hand of Fire	2010	United States		
Hatesphere	1998	Denmark		Hatesphere at Hamburg Metal Days, 2014
Hatriot	2011	United States		
The Haunted	1996	Sweden		The Haunted, Karlstad, 2007
Hatchet	2006	United States		
Havok	2004	United States		Havok performing in 2013
Heathen	1984	United States		Kragen Lum and Jason Viebrooks of Heathen at Helfest, 2013
Hellhammer	1981	Switzerland		
Helstar	1982	United States		Helstar in Aschaffenburg, Germany, 2009
Hermética	1987	Argentina		
Hirax	1982	United States		Hirax in Buenos Aires, Argentina, 2009
Hobbs' Angel of Death	1987	Australia		
Holocausto	1985	Brazil		
Holy Moses	1980	Germany		Sabina Classen of Holy Moses, 2005
Horcas	1988	Argentina		
Hyades	1996	Italy		

== I ==
Band	Formed	Origin	Note	
Iced Earth	1984	United States		
Infernäl Mäjesty	1986	Canada		
Intruder	1987	United States		Intruder, Germany, 2004
Invocator	1987	Denmark		
Iron Angel	1983	Germany		

== J ==
Band	Formed	Origin	Note
Juggernaut	1985	United States	

== K ==
Band	Formed	Origin	Note	
Kayser	2004	Sweden		
Kekal	1995	Indonesia		Jeff Arwadi of Kekal in the Netherlands, 2004
Killotine	2024	Canada		
Korrozia Metalla	1984	Russia		
Korzus	1983	Brazil		
Kreator	1982	Germany		Kreator at Kraków, Poland, 2009
Kraptor	2007	Venezuela		
Kryptos	1998	India		Kryptos at Harley Rock Riders Season III, India, 2012

== L ==
Band	Formed	Origin	Note	
Lȧȧz Rockit	1982	United States		
Lair of the Minotaur	2003	United States		
Lamb of God	1994	United States		Randy Blythe of Lamb Of God during Ozzfest 2004
Lawnmower Deth	1987	United Kingdom		
Lazarus A.D.	2005	United States		
Leeway	1984	United States		
Legion of the Damned	2004	Netherlands		Harold Gielen of Legion of the Damned at Metalcamp, 2009
Lethal	1988	Argentina		
Living Death	1980	Germany		
Living Sacrifice	1989	United States		
Loudblast	1986	France		
Lost Society	2010	Finland		
Lyzanxia	1996	France		
Lich King	2004	United States		

== M ==
Band	Formed	Origin	Note	
Machine Head	1991	United States		Phil Demmel of Machine Head, 2009
Malefice	2003	United Kingdom		Dale Butler of Malefice, 2010
Mantic Ritual	2004	United States		
Massakre	1982	Chile		
Master	1987	Russia		Master, DMC Fest, Ufa, 2011
Megadeth	1983	United States		Megadeth, 2010
Mekong Delta	1985	Germany		Mekong Delta at Kilkim žaibu XII festival, Lithuania, 2011
Meliah Rage	1986	United States		
Memorain	1999	Greece		
Messiah	1984	Switzerland		
Metal Allegiance	2014	United States		
Metal Church	1980	United States		Kurdt Vanderhoof of Metal Church, Germany, 2005
Metallica	1981	United States		Kirk Hammett and James Hetfield of Metallica at London, England, 2008
Merciless	1986	Sweden		
M.O.D.	1986	United States		
Mokoma	1996	Finland		Santtu Hämäläinen and Marko Annala of Mokoma at Myötätuulirock, Finland, 2011
Morbid	1986	Sweden		
Morbid Saint	1982	United States		
Mordred	1984	United States		
Mortal Sin	1985	Australia		Mortal Sin at Jalometalli Metal Music Festival, Finland, 2008
Mortification	1987	Australia		
Municipal Waste	2001	United States		Municipal Waste at Finnish Metal Expo, Helsinki, Finland 2008
Mutilator	1985	Brazil		

== N ==
Band	Formed	Origin	Note	
NadimaČ	2003	Serbia		
Nailbomb	1994	United States		Nailbomb, 2011
Nasty Savage	1983	United States		
Necrodeath	1985	Italy		Necrodeath at Korxefest, Genoa, Italy, 2010
Necronomicon	1983	Germany		Necronomicon promotional photo, 2013
Nevermore	1991	United States		Warrel Dane of Nevermore in Dinkelsbühl, 2005
Nervosa	2010	Brazil		
Nocturnal Breed	1996	Norway		
Nuclear	1998	Chile		
Nuclear Assault	1984	United States		

== O ==
Band	Formed	Origin	Note	
Obliveon	1987	Canada		
One Bad Pig	1985	United States		
Onslaught	1983	United Kingdom		
Outrage	1982	Japan		
Overkill	1980	United States		Overkill at Metalmania, 2008

== P ==
Band	Formed	Origin	Note	
Paradox	1986	Germany		
Pentagram Chile	1985	Chile		
Possessed	1983	United States		Possessed at Jalometalli Metal Music Festival, 2008
Powersurge	2006	Bangladesh		
Power Trip	2008	United States		
Prong	1986	United States		Tommy Victor of Prong, 2008
Prototype	1994	United States		

== R ==
Band	Formed	Origin	Note	
RAMP	1989	Portugal		
Ratos de Porão	1981	Brazil		Ratos de Porão at Virada Cultural, 2007
Razor	1984	Canada		Razor in Toronto, Ontario, Canada, 2008
Recon	1986	United States		
Revocation	2006	United States		
Rifftera	2010	Finland		
Rigor Mortis	1983	United States		Rigor Mortis performing in 2014
Ruin	2005	United States		

== S ==
Band	Formed	Origin	Note	
S7N	2009	Mexico		
Sabbat	1985	United Kingdom		Andy Sneap and Simon "Jack Hammer" Jones of Sabbat at London Scala, London, 2008
Sabbat	1983	Japan		
Sacrament	1989	United States		
Sacred Oath	1984	United States		
Sacred Reich	1985	United States		Sacred Reich at Rock Hard Festival, 2014
Sacrifice	1983	Canada		Sacrifice in Toronto, Ontario, Canada, 2009
Sacrilege	1984	United Kingdom		
Sadus	1984	United States		
Sarcófago	1985	Brazil		
Sanatorium	1987	Macedonia		
Sarke	2008	Norway		
Scatterbrain	1989	United States		
Segression	1990	Australia		
Sepultura	1984	Brazil		Andreas Kisser of Sepultura at Virada Cultural, 2008
Seventh Angel	1987	United Kingdom		Ian Arkley of Seventh Angel at Blast of Eternity, 2012
Sex Machineguns	1989	Japan		
Shadows Fall	1995	United States		Brian Fair of Shadows Fall at Turock Open Air, Essen, Germany, 2014
Short Sharp Shock	2005	United Kingdom		
Skeletonwitch	2003	United States		Skeletonwitch in Munich, 2014
Skin Chamber	1991	United States		
Skrew	1990	United States		
Slayer	1981	United States		Slayer at Hellfest, 2007
Slaughter	1984	Canada		
Sodom	1981	Germany		Tom Angelripper of Sodom at Hole in the Sky, 2009
Soulfly	1997	United States		Soulfiy in 2005
Stam1na	1996	Finland		
Stone	1985	Finland		
Stormtroopers of Death	1985	United States		
Strapping Young Lad	1994	Canada		
Sturmgeist	2002	Norway		
Suicidal Angels	2001	Greece		Nick Melissourgos of Suicidal Angels, 2012
Suicidal Tendencies	1981	United States		Mike Muir of Suicidal Tendencies, 2011
Susperia	1998	Norway		
Swashbuckle	2005	United States		Commodore Redrum of Swashbuckle at Paganfest America 2009
Sylosis	2000	United Kingdom		Sylosis at Victoria Hall, Stoke-on-Trent, 2009

== T ==
Band	Formed	Origin	Note	
Tankard	1982	Germany		Tankard at "South of Heaven", Betong, Oslo, Norway
Tenet	1996	Canada		
Terror 2000	1999	Sweden		
Testament	1983	United States		Testament at Sweden Rock Festival, 2008
Thanatos	1984	Netherlands		
Tonic Breed	2006	Norway		Patrik Svendsen of Tonic Breed, 2012
Tourniquet	1989	United States		Ted Kirkpatrick of Tourniquet, 2007
Torque	1994	United States		
Torturer	1989	Chile		
Toxic Holocaust	1999	United States		Phil Zeller of Toxic Holocaust, Zal Ozhidaniya, Saint Petersburg, Russia, 2014
Toxik	1985	United States		
Transmetal	1987	Mexico		
Tremonti	2011	United States		
Trivium	2000	United States		Matt Heafy of Trivium at With Full Force festival, 2011

== U ==
Band	Formed	Origin	Note
Ultimatum	1992	United States	
United	1981	Japan	
Unlocking the Truth	2007	United States	

== V ==
Band	Formed	Origin	Note	
Varga	1989	Canada		
Vektor	2002	United States		Vektor in Hamilton, Ontario, 2012
Vengeance Rising	1987	United States		
Venom	1979	United Kingdom		Venom at Hellfest, 2008
Venom Inc.	2015	United Kingdom		
Viking	1986	United States		
Violator	2002	Brazil		
Vio-lence	1985	United States		
Voivod	1982	Canada		Voivod at Masters of Rock, Vizovice, Poland, 2009
Vulcano	1981	Brazil		

== W ==
Band	Formed	Origin	Note	
Warbringer	2004	United States		Warbringer in Rostock, Germany, 2012
Watchtower	1982	United States		
Whiplash	1984	United States		
Witchery	1997	Sweden		
Wrust	2000	Botswana		

== X ==
Band	Formed	Origin	Note	
Xentrix	1985	United Kingdom		Paul MacKenzie of Xentrix at Headbangers Open Air, 2014

== Y ==
Band	Formed	Origin	Note
Yyrkoon	1995	France	

== Z ==
Band	Formed	Origin	Note
Znöwhite	1982	United States	
Zoetrope	1978	United States	

== See also ==
- Heavy metal music
- List of heavy metal bands
- List of crossover thrash bands
- List of groove metal bands
