= Undead Legacy =

Studio album by Bewized
- Released: October 28, 2013
- Recorded: December 2012 at StelthSound / Red House Studios, Thessaloniki, Greece
- Genre: Groove metal, metalcore
- Length: 42:26
- Label: Noisehead Records
- Producer: Jon Howard

Bewized chronology
The Scorch of Rage (2011)	Undead Legacy (2013)

Undead Legacy is the second full-length album by Greek groove metal band Bewized, released on 28 October 2013, through Noisehead Records. It was recorded at StelthSound / Red House Studios by Stelios "Stelth" Koslidis and Emmanouil Hermano Tselepis. The mixing and mastering were handled by Jon Howard (Threat Signal) at Woodward Avenue Studios in Ontario, Canada. In addition, Howard made a guest appearance on the second track, "Medusa's Head", while Björn "Speed" Strid from Soilwork contributed his vocals to "Heart Bled Dry".

== Story notes ==
According to guitarist/singer/songwriter Paschalis Theotokis, Undead Legacy is constructed on Homer poems. Homer is the author of the Iliad and the Odyssey, and is revered as the greatest of ancient Greek epic poets.

== Track details ==
The album has three main parts; It kicks in with "War I Wage" (track 1) which is based on the Iliad. The Iliad relates a part of the Trojan War, the siege of Troy. It runs through some songs to meet the second station which is "The Tempest" (track 5), fully based on the Odyssey. The Odyssey describes Odysseus rough journey home. The album finishes with the last part of the Odyssey, Odysseus return to Ithaca, slaying of the suitors to find his own peace of mind "Vindication" (track 11).

Professional ratings
Review scores
Source	Rating
Metal Rules	3/5 stars
Croncrete Web	95/100
Holtkeltok [HU]	86%
Earshot [AT]	4.5/7
Greek Rebels [GR]	8/10 stars
Chromium Sun [CY]	8/10 stars
Rock Overdose [GR]	80/100
Rock Hard [GR]	8/10 stars
Metal Temple	7/10 stars
Metallized [IT]	68/100

== Track listing ==
No.	Title	Length
1.	"War I Wage"	4:01
2.	"Medusa's Head" (feat. Jon Howard from Threat Signal)	3:18
3.	"Pray Last Sin"	4:03
4.	"Monster in Your Closet"	4:12
5.	"The Tempest"	3:37
6.	"Heart Bled Dry" (feat. Björn "Speed" Strid from Soilwork)	3:43
7.	"Crush[he]ader"	3:57
8.	"The Prodigal Son" (Instrumental)	1:35
9.	"Judas Kiss"	4:32
10.	"Break of Dawn"	5:03
11.	"Vindication"	3:51
Total length:		42:26

== Personnel ==
- Paschalis Theotokis – lead vocals, guitar
- Orestis Georgiadis – lead guitar
- Pantazis Theotokis – bass
- Akis Tsiantis – drums
