= List of crossover thrash bands =

The following is a list of bands that either were, are or have been associated with the genre crossover thrash, a fusion genre of thrash metal and hardcore punk.

- The Accüsed
- Acid Drinkers
- Acid Reign
- Agnostic Front
- Angkor Wat
- Anti Feminism
- Attitude Adjustment
- Austrian Death Machine
- Beowülf
- Black Pantera
- Blunt Force Trauma
- Body Count
- Broken Bones
- Broken Teeth
- Call to Preserve
- Carnivore
- Cerebral Fix
- Clown Alley
- Concrete Sox
- Corrosion of Conformity (early)
- Cro-Mags
- The Crucified
- Crumbsuckers
- Cryptic Slaughter
- Dayglo Abortions
- Dead Brain Cells
- Dead Cross
- Dead Horse
- Death Ray Vision
- Drain
- D.R.I.
- Discharge
- Dr. Know
- Dresden 45
- English Dogs
- Excel
- The Exploited
- Eyesburn
- Fearless Iranians from Hell
- Final Conflict
- Final Warning
- Gang Green
- GBH
- Generation Kill
- Gwar
- Higher Power
- Hogan's Heroes
- The Icemen
- Iron Reagan
- Judiciary
- Leeway
- Lobotomia
- Los Cycos
- Ludichrist
- M.O.D.
- Mucky Pup
- Municipal Waste
- NadimaČ
- Nuclear Assault
- Outrage A.D.
- Pest Control
- Phantasm
- Poison the Well
- Power Trip
- Prong
- Ratos de Porão
- Raw Power
- Rytmihäiriö
- Send More Paramedics
- Short Sharp Shock (SSS)
- Sick Mother Fakers
- Soziedad Alkoholika
- S.O.D.
- Suicidal Tendencies
- Sworn Enemy
- This is Hell
- Toxic Holocaust
- Trash Talk
- Uncle Slam (previously known as The Brood)
- Vegan Reich
- Verbal Abuse
- Void
- What Happens Next?
- Yellow Machinegun
- Zombie Apocalypse

== See also ==
- List of thrash metal bands
- List of hardcore punk bands
