= Blunt Force Trauma =

Blunt force trauma is a medical term referring to a type of physical trauma.

Blunt Force Trauma may also refer to:

- Blunt Force Trauma (film), a 2015 American-Colombian film
- Blunt Force Trauma (band), an American hardcore punk and thrash metal band
- Blunt Force Trauma (album), a 2011 album by Cavalera Conspiracy
- "Blunt Force Trauma", a song on the 2004 album New Found Power by Damageplan
- "Blunt Force Trauma", a song on the 1996 album Purification Through Violence by Dying Fetus
