= The Scorch of Rage =

Studio album by Bewized
- Released: April 25, 2011
- Recorded: 2010 at Noise Factory Studios, Thessaloniki, Greece
- Genres: Groove metal, thrash metal, progressive metal
- Length: 44:22
- Label: Casket Music
- Producer: Paschalis Theotokis

Bewized chronology
Carved Upon Your Bones (2008)	The Scorch of Rage (2011)	Undead Legacy (2013)

The Scorch of Rage is the debut album by Greek groove metal band Bewized, released on 25 April 2011, through Casket Music. It was recorded at Noise Factory Studios by Christian Rahm, mixed and mastered by Fotis Demertzis at Mix Studios (Thessaloniki, Greece).

== Track listing ==
No.	Title	Length
1.	"Prelude to Reign" (instrumental)	1:14
2.	"Laceration of Innocence"	4:32
3.	"Tyrant's Tirade"	4:59
4.	"Exhaling Perfection"	4:36
5.	"Sober"	4:17
6.	"Done unto Me"	4:53
7.	"Cages into Cages"	3:19
8.	"Conjure (Unbreakable)"	3:58
9.	"Redeemer"	4:01
10.	"Cyanide Blood"	4:16
11.	"For This I Swear"	4:17
Total length:		44:22

Professional ratings
Review scores
Source	Rating
Pavillon666 [FR]	7.5/10
Metalcry [ES]	7/10 stars
Femforgacs [HU]	7/10 stars
Rock Hard [GR]	7/10 stars
Metal Revolution [DK]	66/100
Allschools [DE]	6/10

== Personnel ==
- Paschalis Theotokis – lead vocals, guitar
- Orestis Georgiadis – lead guitar
- Pantazis Theotokis – bass
- Kostis Tatsis – drums
