= Múr (album) =

Studio album by Múr
- Released: 22 November 2024
- Genres: Progressive metal; post-metal
- Length: 54:28
- Label: Century Media

Múr is the debut studio album by the Icelandic metal band Múr. The album was released on 22 November 2024 by Century Media Records.

== Background and singles ==
Prior to the formation of Múr, future members of the band, Kári Haraldsson and two guitarists, Hilmir Árnason and Jón Ísak Ragnarsson, whom Kári had known since school. Together, they played cover versions of their favorite songs in the garage. Later, the guys entered a music school, where they studied jazz music. There they met future members of the band - drummer Árni Jökull Guðbjartsson and bassist Ívar Andri Klausen. The artists organized Múr in 2018 and in 2021, they participated in the metal band competition Wacken Metal Battle, where they finished in first place in Iceland and fourth at the international stage.

On 18 September 2024, Múr released their debut single entitled "Heimsslit". The following month, the band released the second single "Frelsari". On 13 November, Múr released the third and final single "Holskefla".

== Critical reception ==
Professional ratings
Review scores
Source	Rating
Blabbermouth.net	8/10

Metal.de journalist Markus Endres called the album strong. He appreciated the musicality, sophistication, and varied moods of Múr's music. He particularly highlighted the latter aspect in the song "Heimsslit," calling it "the most unusual" on the album. Blabbermouth.net reviewer David Gehlke noted that the band hasn't yet found its signature style, but hopes the musicians will find their sound in the future.

== Track listing ==
No.	Title	Length
1.	"Eldhaf"	9:04
2.	"Múr"	5:51
3.	"Frelsari"	4:07
4.	"Vitrun"	9:37
5.	"Messa"	4:18
6.	"Heimsslit"	11:01
7.	"Holskefla"	10:25
Total length:		54:23

== Personnel ==
- Kári Haraldsson – lead vocals, keyboards
- Jón Ísak Ragnarsson – guitar
- Hilmir Árnason – guitar
- Ívar Andri Klausen – bass
- Árni Jökull Guðbjartsson – drums
