= Eradikated =

Swedish thrash metal band

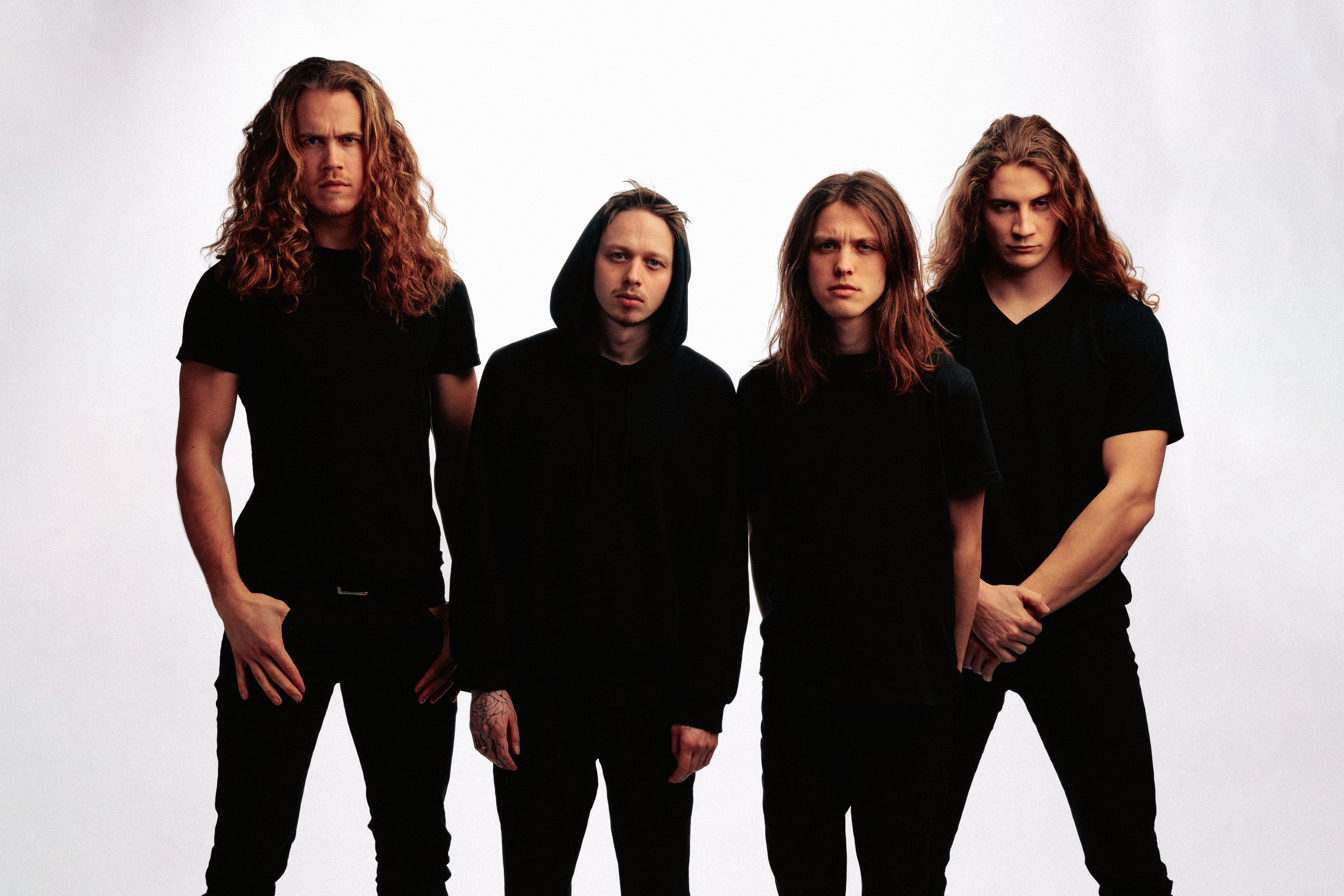
- Eradikated in 2023

Background information
- Also known as: The Generations Army (2014–2021)
- Origin: Sweden
- Genres: Thrash metal
- Years active: 2014-present
- Label: Indie Recordings
- Members: Elvin Csizmadia; Ragnar Östberg; Erland Östberg; Calle Moberg
- Website: eradikated.com

Eradikated is a Swedish thrash metal band formed in Höör, Sweden 2014.

Eradikated formed in 2014 under the name The Generations Army, but in 2021 the band changed their name to Eradikated, which they are known as today.

== History ==
=== The Generations Army (2014–2021) ===
Eradikated was formed in 2014 as The Generations Army in Höör, Sweden. They released their debut album, Still Screaming, on 13 January 2017, as well as an EP, called Voices and Visions, released in 2018.

=== Eradikated (2021–2023) ===
In February 2021 the band signed a management deal with Martin Gustafsson. Martin claimed that the band was already then set on changing their name, but it wasn't before on 19 September that the band officially changed their name to Eradikated.

On 19 November 2021 Eradikated released their first EP under the new name. The EP contained newly recorded versions of former songs and was recorded in Easthill Audio.

On 7 June 2023 Eradikated opened for the Sweden Rock Festival.

=== Generations (2023–2026) ===
Eradikated released three singles from their debut album under their new name, Generations. The singles "Flames", "Faced", and "Flood", were released between March and August 2023.

Generations was released on 6 October 2023 on the label Indie Recordings. The album was nominated for the Grammis hard rock/metal album of the year award the same year.

Eradikated appeared on The Rising Four, a tour together with Eternal Evil, Sarcator and Bloodstain from October to December 2024.

=== Wiring of Violence (2026-) ===
Eradikated began work on their second studio album, Wiring of Violence, following the release of their debut album Descendants in 2023. The album was released on 8 May 2026 through Indie Recordings. It contains eleven tracks and has a total running time of approximately 32 minutes. The album was recorded by Top Floor Studios and East Hill Audio, with production and recording handled by Ragnar Östberg and Jakob Herrmann among others.

Three singles were released ahead of the album. "British Petroleum" was released on 19 February 2026 as the first single and was accompanied by an official music video. "Precipice" followed on 20 March, while "Mortality" was released on 14 April, as the third single.

The album's lyrics address social and political subjects. Contemporary reviews identified themes including environmental concerns, war, social inequality and personal struggles. "British Petroleum", for example, was described as addressing the relationship between fossil-fuel interests, military conflict and economic power, while "Precipice" deals with the consequences of war.

Musically, Wiring of Violence has been described as thrash metal incorporating both old-school and modern elements. Reviews noted influences associated with the Bay Area thrash metal scene, while also identifying elements of crossover thrash and groove-oriented metal.

The album received generally positive reviews from metal publications. ''Dead Rhetoric'' gave the album a rating of 8.5/10, praising its combination of old-school and modern thrash influences, while ''Metal Archives'' listed a 78% review score. Other reviews similarly highlighted the album's speed, aggressive riffing and production, although some critics considered its songwriting relatively conservative and suggested that the band could develop a more distinctive sound on subsequent releases.

The album release is followed by a tour with Havok, Blood Red Throne and Xonor which started on 10 September 2026.

== Members ==
Current members

- Elvin Landaeus Csizmadia – Lead vocals & guitar (2014–present)
- Ragnar Östberg – Lead guitar & backing vocals (2014–present)
- Erland Östberg – Bass & vocals (2014–present)
- Calle Frogner Moberg – Drums (2014–present)

== Discography ==
=== As The Generations Army ===
Albums

- Still Screaming (2017)

EPs and Singles

- Voices and Visions EP (2018)

=== As Eradikated ===
Albums

- Descendants (2023)
- Wiring of Violence (2026)

EPs and Singles

- Eradikated EP (2021)
- "Flames" (2023)
- "Faced" (2023)
- "Flood" (2023)
- "British Petroleum" (2026)
- "Precipice" (2026)
- "Mortality" (2026)
