= Toxicon (band) =

Australian heavy metal band

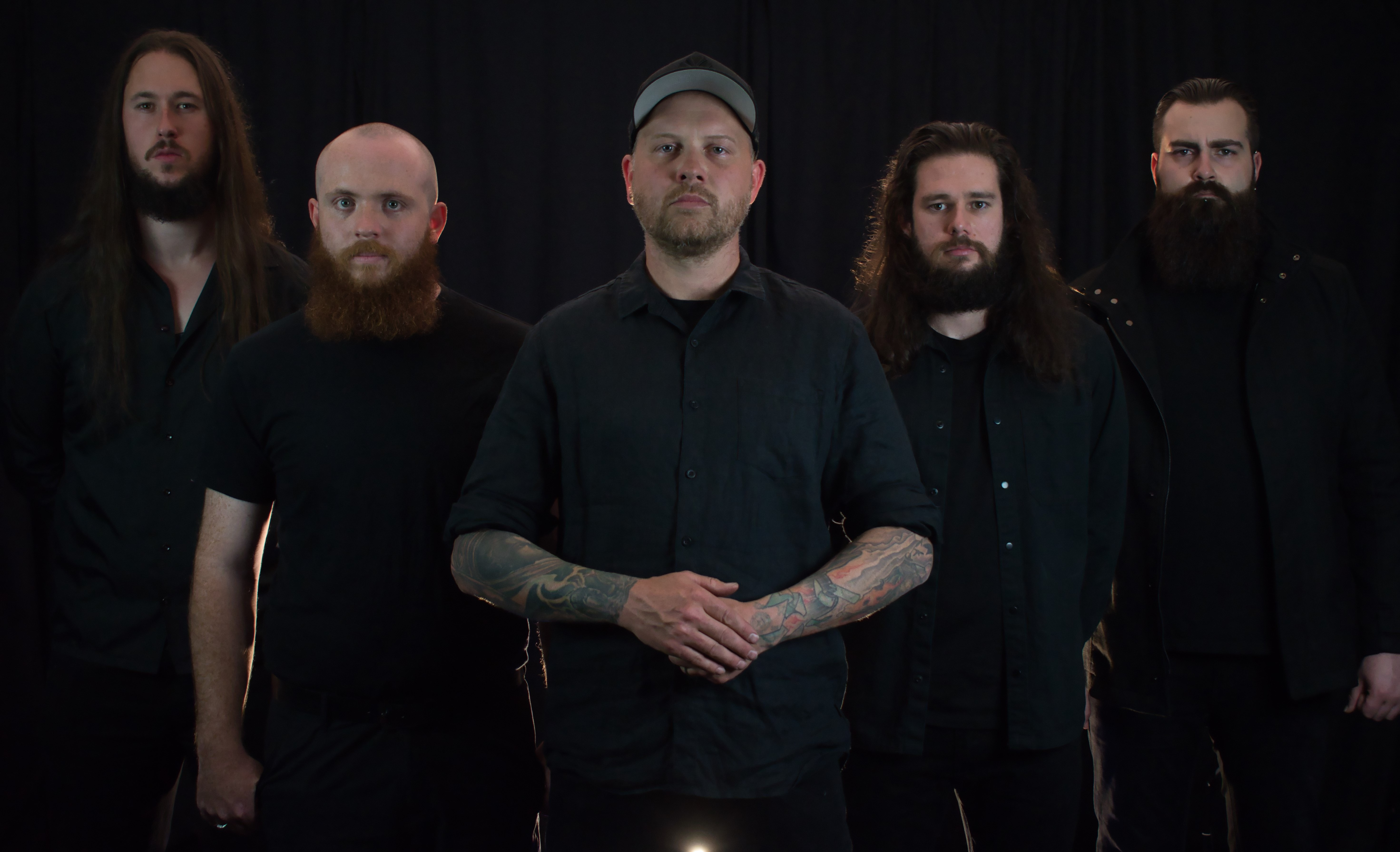
- Toxicon 2021

Background information
- Origin: Geelong, Victoria, Australia
- Genres: Heavy metal, groove metal
- Years active: 2012–2022
- Label: Independent
- Members: Wayne Clarris; Adam Esposti; Bart Walters; Jacob Maloney; Thomas Nunan
- Past members: Paul Jones

Toxicon was an Australian heavy metal band from Geelong, Victoria, formed in 2012. The band consisted of vocalist Wayne Clarris, guitarist Adam Esposti, bassist Jacob Maloney, and drummer Thomas Nunan. The band had a debut album Purge and a standalone single "Circling", both released to positive review and a second album, Be The Fire & Wish For The Wind, released in 2022. The band had its own distinctive style of metal that comprises multiple subgenres, which they call "Hybrid Metal".

== History ==
=== Formation (2012–2015) ===
Toxicon was first founded by Paul Jones and Adam Esposti, who met in high school through mutual love of Black Label Society. The first get-togethers at Adam's house yielded riffs for what would eventually become "Nowhere To Go" and "Deadly Sin". Jacob Maloney was brought in to play bass by Adam after his old band "The Warning" broke up and Thomas Nunan, long time friend of Paul's, was contacted to play drums. Thomas would fill in for the band while they searched for a permanent drummer but after the disbanding of his band "Mistaking Solitude", he focused his efforts on Toxicon claims he is still "Just filling in". In their search for a singer the band turned to popular musicians website Melband, with singer Wayne Clarris joining the group after a positive interview. The group began practising in a paint shop in the centre of Geelong, often dealing with customers walking in on jam session looking for paint. The band quickly wrote a group of six songs all in the thrashier style. Early influences included Metallica, Megadeth, Black Label Society, Pantera, Lamb of God, Mastodon and Trivium. The band started playing shows in February 2014 starting with 2 shows on their first weekend and regular shows for the first 2 years.

=== Purge (2015–2016) ===
Originally a six-track EP was planned using the first six tracks that the group was playing at live shows. With songs coming along at a quicker pace it was decided to skip the traditional opening EP format and a full-length album would be written as the first release. Thrashier tracks "Deadly Sin", "Nowhere To Go", "Deathproof", "Crawler", "Wall of Mirrors" and "Immersifier" were joined by a more progressive element with "Face of the Earth", "Void" and "Event Horizon" and rockier crowd track "Into The Filth". An opening track was written and re-written several times before a shorter demo developed into a full song with lyrics, going by "Heroes of the Deluge". The band began recording the songs in early 2015 in the upstairs offices at the paint shop. Spearheaded by Paul, and using his studio setup, guitars were recorded using a Kemper Profiling Amp with drums being programmed in by Tom. Multiple versions of each song were produced as newer and better ways of recording were discovered, with some songs being rerecorded as many as 6 times. The album was eventually finished off in Melbourne and sent through to Chris Themelco at Monolith Studios to mix.

The first single from the album was "Void". Released on 1 March 2016 the single garnered positive reactions from fans and critics alike and built anticipation for the upcoming album. The song was released with a video clip and an accompanying string of local shows.

Purge, was released independently on 1 August 2016. The album featured 11 songs and full booklet artwork by Jeff Brown. The tracks, accompanied by between songs ambiences and speeches, told the story of the wanderer and the coming of the four horseman of the apocalypse in a modern setting. The album was received favourably by all reviewers and was accompanied by a national tour including a sold-out hometown Geelong show, dates in Adelaide, Ballarat, Bendigo, Warrnambool, Canberra and Melbourne as well as a support slot in Sydney with Twelve Foot Ninja.

Forté magazine's reviewer described the album's concept with "central themes surrounding the idea of 'impending doom' and 'the purging of your power'".

=== Circling (2017) ===
After the release of Purge the band began writing new material for a follow-up release. Very early in the process, after a bad show where all the lights failed for half a song, a demo entitled "Tight in The Dark" was written. The song was immediately loved by all and was pushed as a follow-up single, independent of a full release. The band entered Black Pearl Studios in Melbourne to record drums and bass, the first track to have live drums to date. All guitars, bass and vocals were recorded at Monolith Studios. Chris Themelco helped produce, engineer and mix the track. "Circling" was released in May 2017, along with its film clip depicting the pitfalls of social media, corruption and politics. A 15 date national tour was announced alongside the release of the single.

After the tour the band went on an unofficial hiatus, playing minimal shows due to the birth of Wayne Clarris' first child.

=== Be the Fire & Wish for the Wind / Paul' departure (2018–2022) ===
In early 2017, the band began work on a follow-up to their 2016 release. Adam, Jacob and Tom all moved into a house in Geelong, jokingly known as "The Sharps Box", and began working on songs for the new release. Over 30 songs were written between all members and cut down to 12. These were then reworked, with lyrics and solos written, and all tracks pre produced at the house. In July 2019 the band entered Echidna Studios to track drums with Chris Themelco of Monolith Studios. Over the course of the next 8 months all other parts would be completed with guitars and vocals having to be spread out due to COVID-19 restrictions in the Melbourne area. The album was reportedly finished in mid 2020. All information provided by the band as well as leaked footage suggest that they had moved away from the more traditional thrash/heavy metal genre and that the new album focuses more on vocals, with a swing towards more clean singing and melody.

In September 2020, it was announced that founding guitarist Paul Jones would be leaving the band.

Further hiatus continued with the band releasing entirely online video content to their YouTube Channel. It was announced in June that the album had been finished and they would be playing local shows again towards the end of 2021. On Friday 26 November 2021, the band announced that they had found a new guitarist and welcomed long time friend Bart Walters to the band to join Adam on guitar. They also confirmed new music would be released very soon.

Toxicon released information on 3 December announcing the release of new single "Parallelysis" for the following week. They also released the name of upcoming second album as Be The Fire & Wish For The Wind. On Friday 10 December the band released "Parallelysis" to reasonable fanfare from fans and reviewers. The single was released with a lyric video, as well as guitar playthrough, drum playthrough, guitar lesson and reflections video to support and tell the story of the song. A limited run of vinyl singles were also produced with a second album song "Fear Itself" on it. Be The Fire & Wish For The Wind was released the next year on September 2, 2022.

== Musical style ==
The musical component of Toxicon was a mixture of different genres of metal. Among them - alternative, thrash, groove, heavy and others. In an interview, drummer Thomas Nunan stated:

"The band likes to describe our sound as "Hybrid Metal", not just cause it sounds cool but because it best encompasses how we sound. It's a great mix of old school thrash, groove metal, alt rock, and just heavy metal in general. It's also much better than saying we are "Alternative, post trash, pre rock, groove metal. Because we have such a widespread sound there is something there for everybody and there are a lot of genre crossovers in our music that appeal to multiple fanbases at once when we play. It's has elements that fans of any genre could love. Want a break down? We got it. Want a head banging riff? We got it. Want beautiful ballads? We got em. We're for everybody."

== Members ==
- Wayne Clarris – vocals
- Adam Esposti – guitar / vocals
- Bart Walters – guitar
- Jacob Maloney – bass / vocals
- Thomas Nunan – drums / vocals

Past members

- Paul Jones – guitar
