= Trials (band) =

American metal band

- Origin: Chicago, Illinois, U.S.
- Genres: Thrash metal, groove metal
- Years active: 2008–2016
- Members: Mark Sugar; Usha Rajbandari; Adam Kopecky; Ryan Bruchert
- Past members: Remy Walle; Sasha Horn
- Website: trials.bandcamp.com

Trials was an American metal band formed in Chicago in 2008. They played a blend of groove metal, thrash metal and metalcore and their music also has melodic and progressive elements.

== History ==
=== Origins (2007–2011) ===
Trials was originally formed by vocalist/guitarist Mark Sugar and former Novembers Doom drummer Sasha Horn, sometime in late 2007. In an interview with About.com, Mark Sugar stated, "We formed...with only two members and the sole intention of recording a demo. The demo got more attention than we bargained for, and we gradually became a full band." As the band's demo gained notoriety in Chicago and beyond, the band recruited bassist Usha Rajbhandari and guitarist Remy Walle, and gradually began writing what would become their first album, Witness to the Downfall.

=== Witness to the Downfall (2011) ===
After several delays, Trials' first album, Witness to the Downfall, was released independently on August 1, 2011. Produced by the band, the record was mixed and mastered by German engineer Lasse Lammert. Artwork duties were handled by Seth Siro Anton, of the band Septicflesh.

During the lengthy recording process, the band parted ways with drummer Sasha Horn. Adam Kopecky joined as the new drummer in 2010, handling all live dates in support of Witness to the Downfall.

The album met with mixed reviews, most notably a 7 out of 10 in Metal Hammer magazine.

=== In the Shadow of Swords (2013) ===
In 2012, the band began work on what would become their second record, In the Shadow of Swords. In the early stages of recording, guitarist Remy Walle parted ways with Trials. The band had little to say about his departure, other than that he was "relieved of his duties". Guitarist Ryan Bruchert, formerly of Chicago grindcore band HeWhoCorrupts, joined the band in July 2012. In the Shadow of Swords would be the first Trials record to feature contributions from Bruchert and Kopecky.

When asked about the band's musical direction, Sugar stated "I think we got a little more progressive since the debut, more complex. The new music is so much darker and more aggressive, and that's really not due to any choice in direction -- it's just the result of our attitudes as people."

The band once again enlisted Lasse Lammert to engineer and mix the record. The cover artwork was created by Sugar, Rajbhandari, and Chris Angelucci of Encrust. The CD version of the album contains a bonus track, "Spirit Leaves", while the digital version contains a cover of Judas Priest's "Jawbreaker".

In the Shadow of Swords was released independently on May 1, 2013. Reviews were generally positive, and markedly improved from the reaction to Witness to the Downfall. The band embarked on a short Midwestern tour in the fall of 2013 in support of the album.

Trials is expected to begin work on their third record in spring of 2014. A new song entitled "Don't Believe the Word" was performed at the 2013 live shows, and other new material has been previewed live on occasion.

=== This Ruined World (2015) ===
In early 2015, the band completed work on their third record, This Ruined World. Recording was handled by Pete Grossmann at Bricktop Recording, while the album was mixed by Quentin Poynter at Gunpoint Studios. The album's official release date is July 24, 2015.

As a preview of the new material, the band released a digital EP in June 2015. The EP features new song "Don't Believe the Word", as well as a cover of Strapping Young Lad's "Far Beyond Metal" as the B-side. Artwork for the EP was drawn by the band's drummer, Adam Kopecky.

In 2016, Trials announced on Facebook that they were no longer an active band.

== Musical style ==
The band's style has been described as thrash/death or progressive thrash metal, with comparisons to thrash bands like Testament and Slayer as well as death metal pioneers Morbid Angel and Death. Band members have also claimed such disparate influences as Strapping Young Lad, Frank Zappa, Satyricon, Failure, and Emperor, among others.

== Band members ==
=== Current members ===
- Mark Sugar – vocals, guitar (2008–present)
- Usha Rajbhandari – bass (2008–present)
- Adam Kopecky – drums (2010–present)
- Ryan Bruchert – guitar (2012–present)

=== Former members ===
- Sasha Horn – drums (2008–2010)
- Remy Walle – guitar (2008–2012)

== Discography ==
Studio albums

- Witness to the Downfall (2011)
- In the Shadow of Swords (2013)
- This Ruined World (2015)
