= Bloodstain (band) =

Swedish thrash metal band

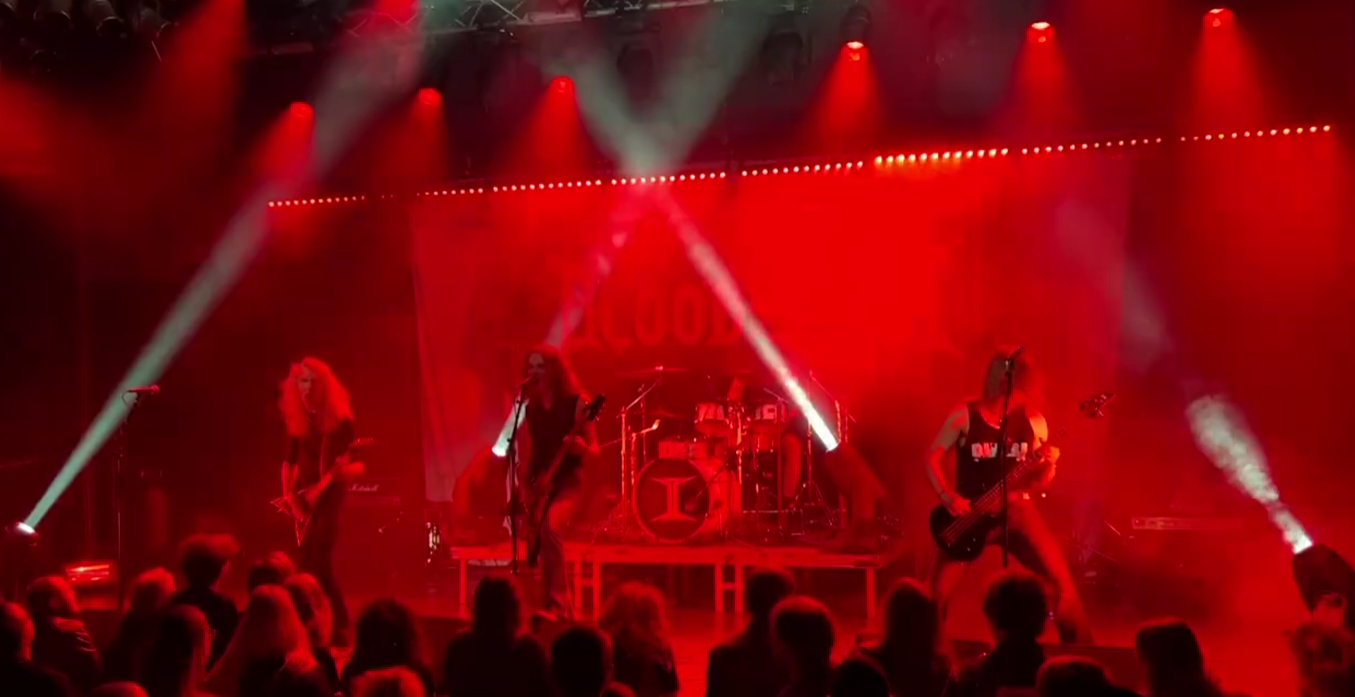
- Bloodstain performing in 2024

Background information
- Origin: Stockholm, Sweden
- Genre: Thrash metal
- Years active: 2023–present
- Label: Threeman Recordings
- Members: Oskar Lindroos; Jonathan Thyberg; Benjamin Norgren; Tobias Lindström
- Past members: Linus Lindin (2023–2025)
- Website: bloodstain.se

Bloodstain is a Swedish thrash metal band formed in late 2023.

== History ==
=== Early years (2023–2025) ===
Bloodstain was founded in fall of 2023 by four classmates at Rytmus music high school in Stockholm, who formed the band to compete in the local music competition Lidingö Rock. The band came second at the competition, and received the award for best guitarist.

In March 2024, Bloodstain released their debut EP I Am Death. The EP has been praised by critics, and set the stage for future releases. This first release also lead to the band's appearance on The Rising Four, a Swedish Metal tour with Eradikated, Eternal Evil, Sarcator and Bloodstain. Shortly after this, they signed a management and production deal with Alex Hellid from Entombed and Threeman Recordings.

=== Debut album (2025–present) ===
Bloodstain toured Sweden together with Dark Tranquility and Múr in October 2025, and has appeared at festivals such as Downtown Riot and Sweden Rock. Alongside performing various concerts around Sweden, Bloodstain haved played at Hellfest 2026 and at Time to Rock 2026.

The band released their debut album, "Bloodstain", on the Swedish record label Threeman Recordings and by extension on Candlelight Records on 25 September, 2026.

== Members ==
Current members

- Oskar Lindroos – lead vocals, guitar (2023–present)
- Tobias Lindström – guitar, backing vocals (2025–present)
- Jonathan Thyberg – bass, backing vocals (2023–present)
- Benjamin Norgren – drums, backing vocals (2023–present)

Past members

- Linus Lindin – lead vocals, guitar (2023–2025)

== Discography ==
=== EPs and singles ===
- I Am Death EP (2024)
- "Lies Bleeding Through" (2025)
- "Banner of Supremacy" (2025)
- "Conspiracy" (2026)
- "Something Sinister" (2026)
- "Annihilation Line" (2026)

=== Albums ===
- Bloodstain (2026)
