= Nu-Nation =

Russian metal band

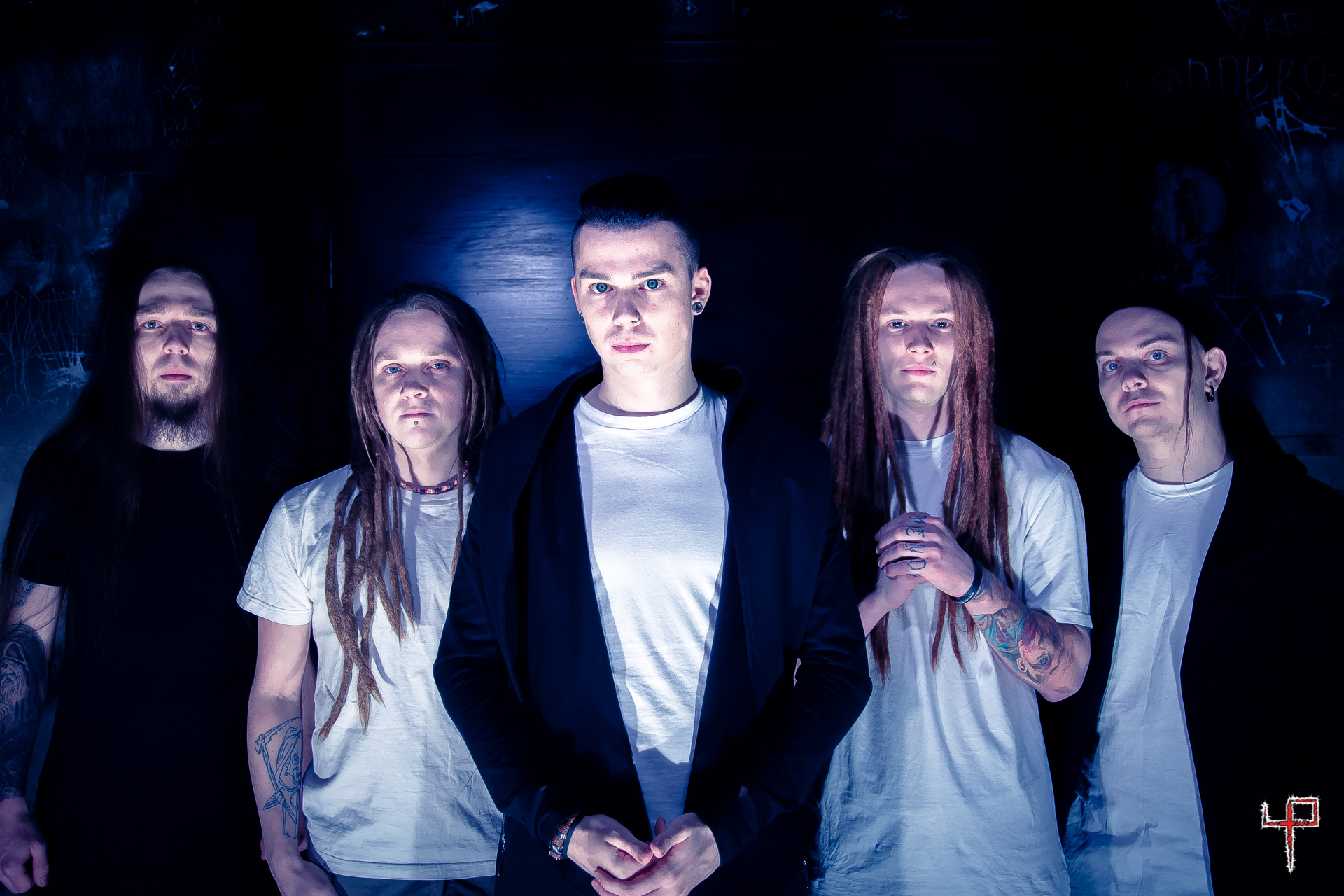

Background information
- Origin: Saint Petersburg, Russia
- Genres: Nu metal, groove metal
- Years active: 2009–present
- Members: Arthur Khlebnikov; Alexander Korsak; Denis Vasiliev; Dmitri Chernykh; Alexei Kiyski
- Website: Nu-Nation on Facebook

Nu-Nation is a Russian nu metal/groove metal band based in Saint Petersburg.

== History ==
Nu-Nation was formed in 2009 by the musicians of several local bands who wanted to play groove metal in the vein of Soulfly. Their first long-play 'Wake Up', was released in 2012, and proved popular with fans of nu-metal and groove metal. Following this, the band had some line-up and style changing. Another album 'The Awakening' came out in 2014, it has a more extreme sound and darker atmosphere. In early 2016, the band released their last album, 'Insomnia', much more brutal but melodic as well, with a lot of music styles and elements mixed. The album received favorable reviews.

== Musical style ==
Nu-Nation started as groove/nu-metal band influenced by Sepultura, Ektomorf, but later changed the style, becoming a kind of extreme metal with elements of groove metal, hardcore, death metal, black metal.

== Members ==
- Arthur Khlevnikov – vocals
- Alexander Korsak – guitars
- Denis Vasiliev – guitars
- Dmitri Chernykh – bass
- Alexei Kiyski – drums

== Discography ==
Studio albums

- 2012 — Wake Up
- 2014 — The Awakening
- 2016 — Insomnia

EPs and singles

- 2010 – Art Of Riot
- 2014 – Oil
- 2014 – Acceleration
- 2015 – No Way Out
- 2016 – Let Me Go (feat. Lena Scissorhands)

Music videos

- 2012 — Wake Up on YouTube
- 2012 — La Vida Libre on YouTube
- 2014 — Maggots In The Pink on YouTube
- 2016 — Make Them Bleed on YouTube
