= Rodrigo Cuadra =

Chilean musician and television presenter

- Also known as: Pera
- Born: 2 August 1967 (age 58)
- Genres: Heavy metal; Thrash metal; Speed metal; Death metal; Progressive metal; Goregrind; Jazz fusion
- Occupations: Musician, TV presenter
- Instruments: Bass guitar, vocals
- Years active: 1984–present
- Labels: Dorsalia, BMG, Inferno

Rodrigo "Pera" Cuadra Burgoa (born 2 August 1967) is a Chilean musician, TV presenter and movie critic. From 2011, he has worked as a panelist in the television show Sin vergüenza, from the Chilevisión open channel, where he comments on paranormal and strange topics.

== Musical career ==
Cuadra is the founder, lead singer and bassist of the death metal and progressive metal band Dorso.

As a musician, Cuadra is known by not using the bass just as an anchor instrument and part of the rhythm section, but expands its range in such a way that it takes center stage in songs like "Expelido del vientre" and "Alrededores del templo" from Bajo una luna Cámbrica, "Romance" from the same-titled album, and "Transformed in cocodrile" from Big Monster Aventura.

In addition, Cuadra has participated in other musical projects:

- SQUAD: Between 1987 and 1989, Cuadra participated in SQUAD. He retired to devote himself to Dorso.
- Insectivadora: Project already has a recorded disc, expected to launch soon.
- Manifiesto: Gamal Eltit project. Currently on hold.
- Solo: According to Cuadra is "a more progressive metalhead project is a little stopped, but will return soon".

== Radio and television ==
Between 1995 and 1998, Cuadra was host of the Maldita Sea TV show, together with his friend Juan Andrés Salfate. The show was based on analyses and discussions on cult films, anime, video games and gore films. The show format included reviews and the hosts commenting on the films while watching them, and became a cult series.

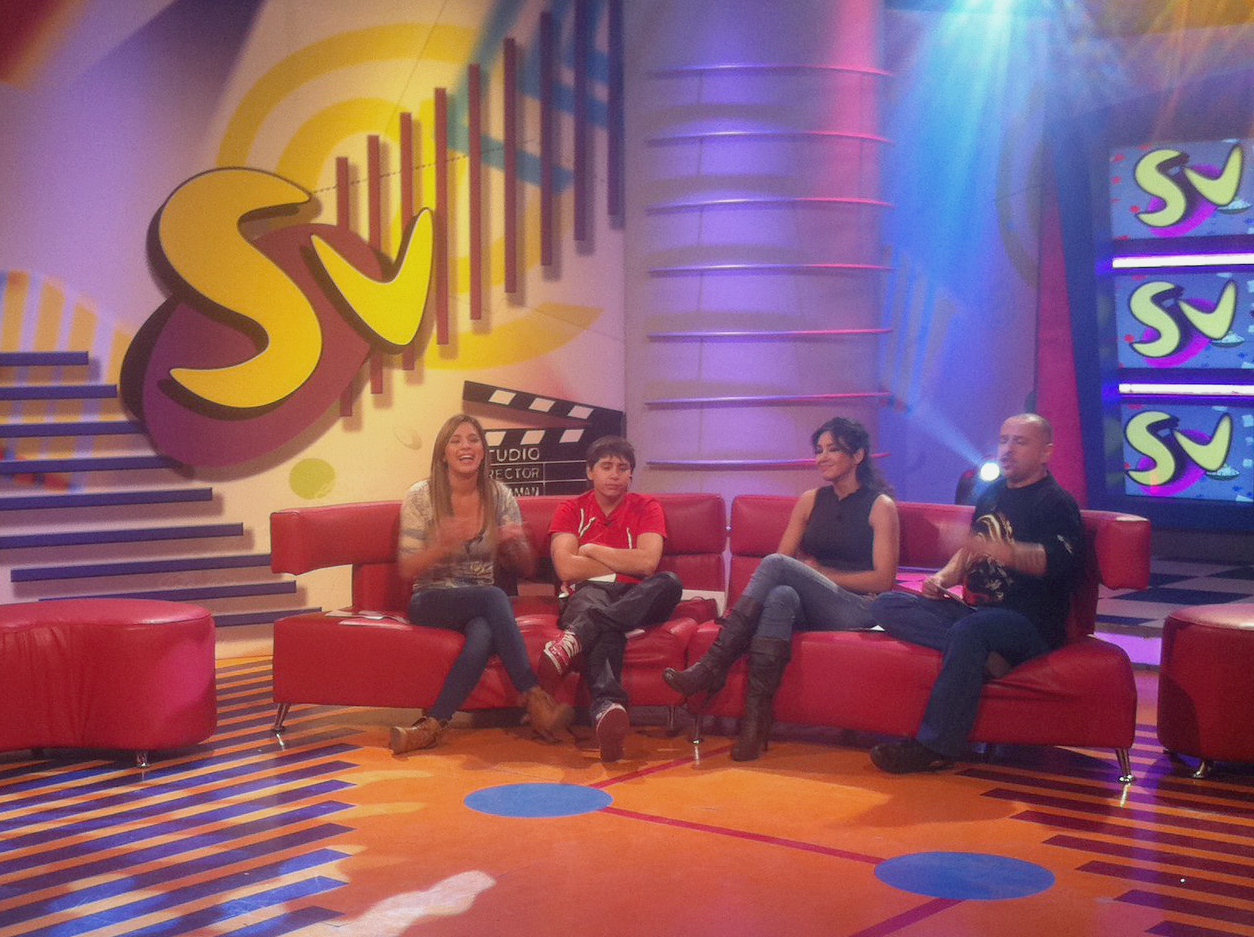
Studio Sin vergüenza of "Chilevisión"

After the end of the Channel 2 Rock & Pop transmissions, Cuadra and Salfate went to La Red to make El rincón maldito (The cursed corner), a show that maintained the same style as its predecessor. Later, in 2004, again migrated with the same scheme, to UCV Televisión, this time with the name Planeta Freak (Freak Planet). They have even staged live events using the show's outline. Finally, in 2011, they went on the air again, this time on the Internet.

From 2011 to 2013, he was the host of the Sin Vergüenza show in Chilevisión.

Since 2015, Cuadra hosts a segment every business day from 5 to 6 pm called RockShop (Radio Show) in Radio Futuro.
