= Bewized =

Greek metal band

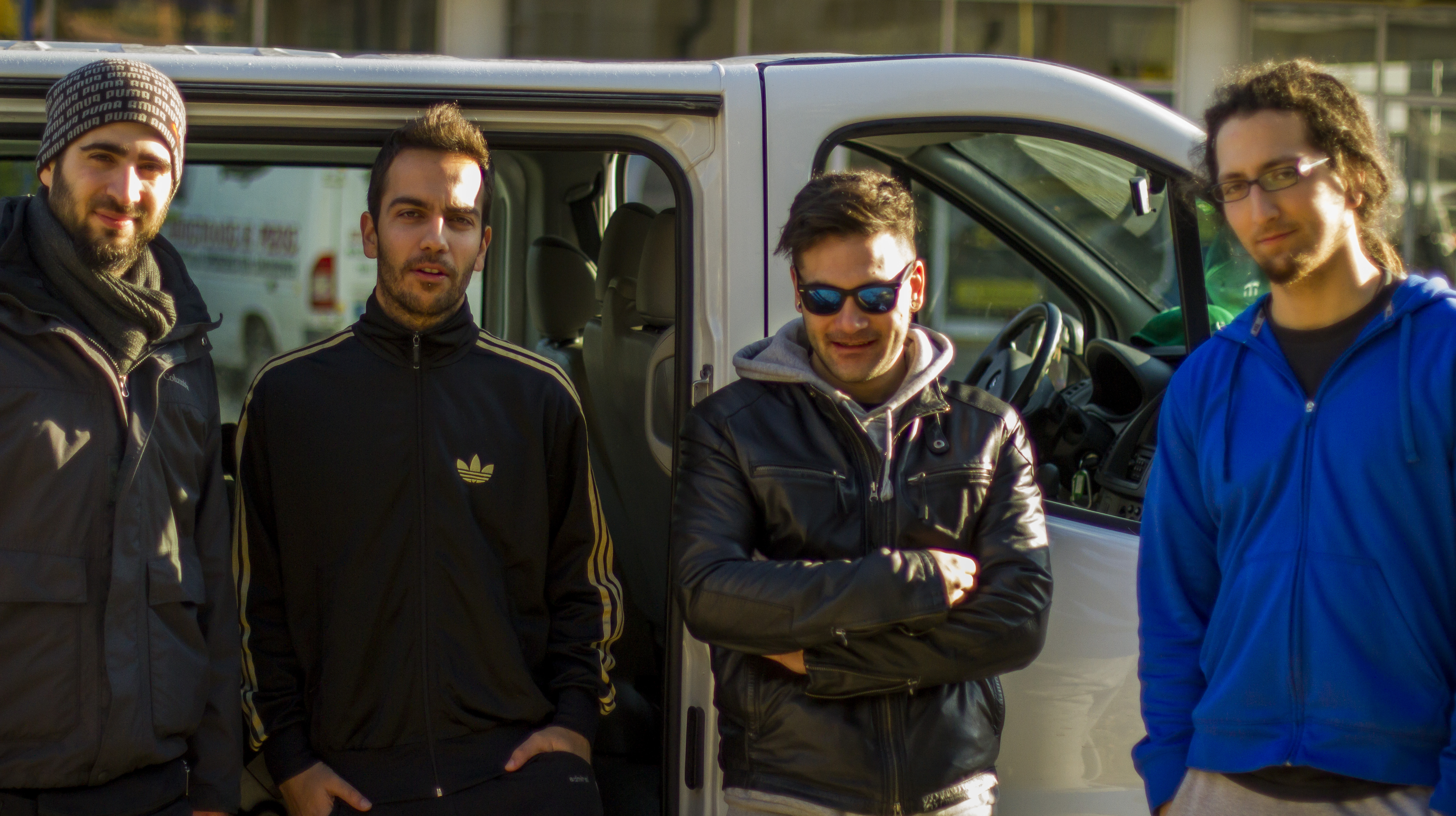
- Bewized in 2013

Background information
- Origin: Thessaloniki, Greece
- Genres: Groove metal, metalcore
- Years active: 2007–present
- Labels: Noisehead, Casket
- Members: Paschalis Theotokis; Pantazis Theotokis; Orestis Georgiadis; Akis Tsiantis
- Past members: Kostis Tatsis; Theodoris Papadopoulos; Giorgos Gafaridis
- Website: bewizedofficial.com

Bewized is a four-piece groove metal / metalcore band from Thessaloniki, Greece, formed in 2007. The band is currently signed to Noisehead Records and have released one demo EP and two studio albums.

== History ==
=== Formation and demo EP (2007–2008) ===
Bewized is the brainchild of Paschalis Theotokis who, along with his younger brother Pantazis Theotokis, co-founded the band in 2007. Carved Upon Your Bones was the quartet's first attempt to establish their presence in the underground metal community. A self-financed demo EP was released in 2008, which drew favorable reviews from the local press.

=== The Scorch of Rage (2009–2011) ===
In November 2010, Bewized signed a deal with Casket Music (a division of Copro Records, UK) for a worldwide release of The Scorch of Rage. Late 2010 also found them with their first official video directed by Bob Katsionis (Nightrage, Rotting Christ, Suicidal Angels) for the track "Laceration of Innocence". Numerous sources reproduced their stuff; from video hosts, webzines, TV shows to online radio stations, along with some positive album reviews from the press, ultimately led Bewized to see a global recognition and exposure. In order to promote their album, shows were scheduled, but part of them went through on a UK tour spanning from 16 to 31 July 2011.

Bewized parted ways with drummer Kostis Tatsis; Akis Tsiantis took on the duties behind the drums.

=== Undead Legacy (2012–2016) ===
Bewized entered the studio in December 2012, and in less than a month, they had finished the recordings of their sophomore album. The CD was recorded at StelthSound / Red House Studios by Stelios "Stelth" Koslidis (Head Cleaner, Human Rejection) and Emmanouil Hermano Tselepis. They announced that the production, mixing and mastering of the album would be undertaken by Jon Howard (Threat Signal, Arkaea) at Woodward Avenue Studios in Ontario, Canada, but kept guest appearances in silence.

In March 2013, they revealed that Jon Howard from Threat Signal and Björn "Speed" Strid from Soilwork would be featured as guest vocalists on their forthcoming album. Later this year, Bewized signed with Noisehead Records to distribute Undead Legacy, a worldwide release set for 28 October 2013. In support of this second album, they set off and toured Greece from 7 to 21 December 2013. Early 2014 found them supporting German metal band Caliban for a hometown show. They also opened for the American band Unearth later the same year, and for the Swedish quintet Adept in 2015.

Their headline touring record was enhanced by two European runs, "The Tempest Across Europe Tour Pt. 1", visiting seven countries during 26 February and 10 March 2015, and "The Tempest Across Europe Tour Pt. 2", visiting five countries (Italy, Switzerland, France, Spain and Czech Republic) in April and July 2016.

== Musical style ==
Followers of the new wave of American heavy metal (NWOAHM) imprinted by pioneering bands such as Machine Head and Lamb of God, along with metalcore influences from Trivium and Killswitch Engage, Bewized forged their own sound, shaping it into something notably their own. Most of their songs are overwhelmed by hefty groovy riffs mixed with aggressive breakdowns while at the same time, clean-sung choruses add harmony.

== Band members ==
Current members

- Paschalis Theotokis – lead vocals, guitar (2007–present)
- Pantazis Theotokis – bass, backing vocals (2007–present)
- Orestis Georgiadis – lead guitar (2010–present)
- Akis Tsiantis – drums (2011–present)

Former members

- Kostis Tatsis – drums (2009–2011)
- Theodoris Papadopoulos – lead guitar (2007–2010)
- Giorgos Gafaridis – drums (2007–2009)

Timeline

== Discography ==
Studio albums

- The Scorch of Rage (Casket Music, 2011)
- Undead Legacy (Noisehead Records, 2013)

EPs

- Carved Upon Your Bones (2008)
