= Phenomy =

Lebanese metal band

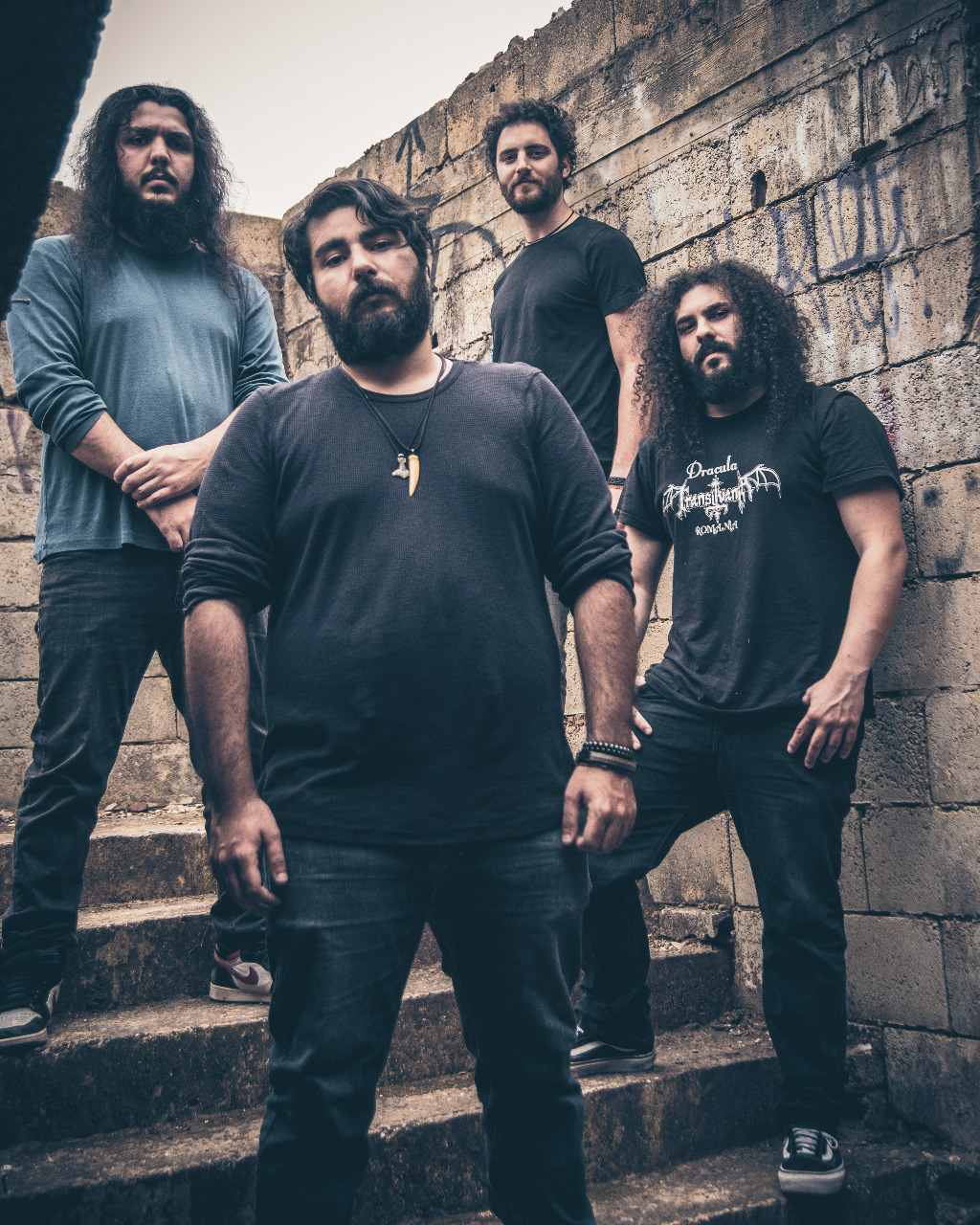
- Phenomy in Lebanon, May 2021

Background information
- Origin: Lebanon
- Genres: Groove metal, thrash metal
- Years active: 2014–present
- Members: Sam Felfly; Loïc El Haddad; Rudy Bejjani; Peter Aoun
- Website: phenomyofficial.com

Phenomy is a heavy metal band from Lebanon formed by Loïc El Haddad (guitarist) and Rudy Bejjani (drummer). Phenomy has released three full-length albums, each with its own touring cycle.

The current lineup includes Rudy Bejjani (drums and percussion), Loïc El Haddad (Lead guitars), Sam Felfly (vocals/rhythm guitars) and Peter Aoun (bass guitar).

== History ==
A few months after their formation and debut performance in December 2014 the band were invited to perform at the Persian Rock And Metal Festival in Çanakkale, Turkey. A lineup change occurred when the band entered the studio to record their first album Once And For All, with the addition of vocalist and rhythm guitarist Sam Felfly.

After releasing Once And For All, Phenomy embarked on their first European tour.

Their second album Threaten World Order. was released in February 2018.

Phenomy entered and won the Middle Eastern chapter of the Wacken Battle of the Bands which enabled them to perform at one of the biggest music and heavy metal festivals, Wacken Open Air. The band also performed at the Metalhead Meeting Festival a month prior to Wacken Open Air.

The band released their third album Syndicate Of Pain, on March 3, 2022, and went on to kick off the Syndicate of Pain Europe Tour in July 2023 in support of the record.

In 2024, Phenomy premiered The Wretched & The Wicked: The Asylum, a graphic novel audiobook inspired by the concept and narrative of Syndicate of Pain. The physical edition was later released through Grotesque Productions. The story follows Dr. Anton Shuman, a mad scientist manipulating patients in an asylum under the guise of rehabilitation, unaware that he himself is part of a larger and more sinister scheme. Drawing inspiration from gothic literature and horror fiction, the work expands on the album’s themes through prose, illustration, and spoken word.

Later that year, the band signed with Extreme Management Group, followed by a deal with Art Gates Records in April 2025. Through the label, Phenomy announced their fourth studio album Phantasmagoria, set for release on November 7, 2025.

== Band members ==
=== Current members ===
- Sam Felfly – lead vocals (2016–present); rhythm guitar (2021–present)
- Loïc El Haddad – lead guitar, backing vocals (2014–present)
- Peter Aoun – bass, backing vocals (2018–present)
- Rudy Bejjani – drums, percussion (2014–present)

=== Former members ===
- Adel Hassan – lead vocals (2014–2015)
- Raymond Ghorayeb – bass (2014–2016)
- Kevin Ghanem – bass (2016–2017)
- Dany Arfan – rhythm guitar (2014–2021)

== Discography ==
=== Studio albums ===
- Once and for All (2016)
- Threaten World Order (2018)
- Syndicate Of Pain (2022)

=== Singles ===
- Day of Reckoning (2017)
- The Memory Remains – Metallica cover (2019)
- Hurt – Nine Inch Nails cover (2020)
- The Mute, the Deaf, the Blind (2020)
- Bone Orchid (2021)
- Ominous (2021)
- Lead Me To My Throne (2022)
- Beyond The Wall Of Sleep (2022)
- When The Darkness Comes (2022)
- Downward Spiral (2023)
- Sacrifice [Re-Imagined] (2023)

== Endorsements ==
=== Solar Guitars ===
Loïc El Haddad (guitarist) joined the Solar Guitars artist roster in March 2020, with Sam Felfly (Vocalist/Guitarist) following suit in May 2021.

=== Bosphorus Cymbals ===
Rudy Bejjani (drummer) has been endorsed by Bosphorus Cymbals since October 2018.

=== Fender ===
Loïc El Haddad (guitarist) became an official Fender artist in June 2025, marking a new collaboration with the brand during the band's upcoming album cycle.
