= Dorso =

Chilean metal band

- Origin: Santiago, Chile
- Genres: Speed metal, thrash metal, progressive metal, extreme metal, avant-garde metal
- Years active: 1984–present
- Labels: BMG, Inferno
- Members: Rodrigo "Pera" Cuadra; Gamal Eltit; Álvaro Soms; Fran Muñoz
- Website: dorso.cl

Dorso is a Chilean metal band. The band's music deals with horror films, sexual fetishes, and Chilean myths.

The band's frontman, Rodrigo Cuadra, became a TV presenter in the 1990s.

== History ==
=== Early years (1984–1988) ===
Rodrigo Cuadra formed Dorso in 1984 as an extreme metal / progressive rock band that drew on dark fantasy literature and gore films.

Dorso's first live performance was in a Ñuñoa gym in 1984, with a setlist of heavy metal covers and original songs.

When they released their first demo, Parajes de lo Desconocido (1985), Dorso was a trio consisting of Cuadra, Gamal Eltit on guitars, and drummer Jaime Palma.

=== 1989–1995 ===
Their first album, Bajo una luna cámbrica, was released in 1989. It was a blend of prog rock-inspired thrash metal described as progressive metal, odd time signatures, and speed metal.

Many consider their second album, Romance (1990), the band's best.

Romance was a moment of great pretension. We wanted to do something long and conceptual. We took advantage of the fact that we were signed with BMG at the time, which gave us very few restrictions. We wanted this album to be symphonic, yet metal.

— Rodrigo "Pera" Cuadra

Eltit and new drummer Eduardo Topelberg left the band over artistic differences after recording Romance. Ex-Nimrod drummer Marcelo Naves and guitarist Alvaro Soms joined the band. This line-up recorded Dorso's best-selling album to date, El Espanto Surge de la Tumba (1993). The album's Spanglish, black humor, bilingual puns, and distinctive riff-writing became the band's defining characteristics.

The following album, Big Monsters Aventura, was released to some success in 1995. The title track was featured on MTV's Headbangers Ball. This album had more goregrind elements than its predecessor.

=== Dorso now (since 1998) ===
Following Disco Blood in 1998, the band released two live albums, followed by a short hiatus and Eltit's return.

In 2008, the band released Espacium, and in 2012, Recolecciones Macabras del Campo Chileno, featuring doom and black metal elements, with lyrics about Chilean myths and legends.

== Band members ==
=== Current lineup ===
- Rodrigo "Pera" Cuadra – vocals and bass, bass overdrive, synths, keyboards, percussion, acoustic guitar (since 1984)
- Gamal Eltit – rhythm guitar, lead guitar, lute, percussion, programming, backing vocals (1984–1991, since 2001)
- Álvaro Soms – lead guitar (since 1991)
- Fran Muñoz – drums, percussion (since 2008)

=== Former members ===
- Mauricio Castillo – lead guitar (1984)
- Alvaro Cuadra – rhythm guitar (1986)
- Claudio Alfaro – bass (1984)
- Juan Francisco Cueto – bass (1995)
- Marcelo Castillo – drums, percussion (1984)
- Gonzalo Lara – drums, percussion (1984)
- Jaime Palma – drums, percussion (1984–1989)
- Rafael Alfaro – drums, percussion (1989)
- Juan Coderch – drums, percussion (1989)
- Eduardo Topelberg – drums, percussion, backing vocals (1989–1991)
- Marcelo Naves – drums, percussion (1991–2008)
- Bernardo Riquelme – percussion (1984)

== Discography ==
=== Albums ===
- Bajo una luna Cámbrica (1989)
- Romance (1990)
- El Espanto Surge de la Tumba (1993)
- Big Monster Aventura (1995)
- Disco Blood (1998)
- Espacium (2008)
- Recolecciones Macabras del Campo Chileno (2012)
- Gore and Roll (2019)

=== Demos ===
- Parajes de lo Desconocido (1985)
- Guerra de Criaturas (1987)

=== Live albums ===
- Lari la live! (2002)
- Unplugged Cósmico (2005)

=== Other tracks ===
- Gallinazeous Death SQVAD (pronounced "Squad") (1989)
- Sangre Eterna (2002)
- El Huésped (2005)

Note: Both Sangre Eterna and El Huésped are included as bonus tracks on Espacium (2008).
