= Tendencia =

Cuban heavy metal band

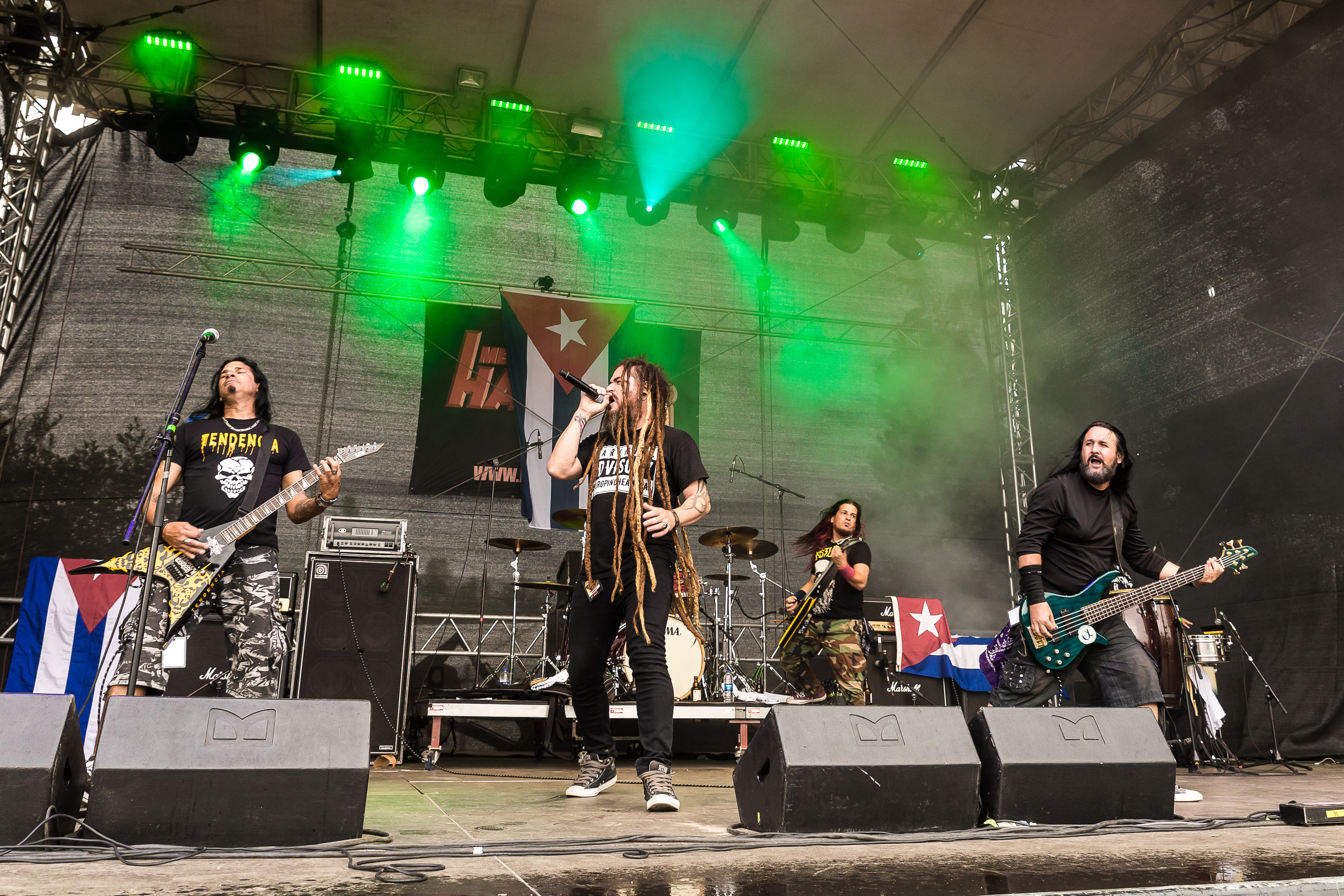
- Tendencia at With Full Force 2018

Background information
- Origin: Cuba
- Genres: Heavy metal
- Years active: 1994–present
- Labels: EGREM, Santo Grial Producciones, Antipop Producciones
- Members: Jose Ernesto Kiko Mederos; Sergio Ernesto Puente Becerra; Alfredo Carballo Concepción; Anier Barrera Tattoo; Lachy Hernández; Emmanuel Candela Pujol
- Website: tendencia.emiweb.es

Tendencia is a Cuban heavy metal band, regarded as one of the most important rock bands in Cuba and widely known throughout Latin America.

== Career ==
Tendencia was formed in Pinar del Río in 1994. The band's lineup has remained stable throughout its history, with guitarist/keyboardist Jose Ernesto Kiko Mederos, guitarist Sergio Ernesto Puente Becerra, bassist Alfredo Carballo Concepción, singer Anier Barrera Tattoo, drummer Lachi Hernández, and percussionist Emmanuel Candela Pujol.

They released their first album Re-evolution in 2001, on the German label System Shock. The album became popular in Latin America and allowed Tendencia to become one of the first Cuban rock bands to be covered in that country's media. They began making regular appearances at the Patria Grande International Rock Festival, which takes place every year in Cuba.

Their second album Rebeldes was released in 2005 on the Cuban label EGREM This album won several Cuban music awards, including the Cubadisco award under the category of best metal album of the year, the D'Arte award, the Cubaneo award, and the Cuerda Viva award. In 2005 they began to tour across Cuba and also traveled to the Metropolitan Festival in Caracas, Venezuela. In 2007 they became the first Cuban band to perform at the Derrame Rock Festival in Spain; this was followed by a tour of several other festivals in that country.

Their third album Confidencial was released in 2008, followed by a tour of festivals in several different European countries. Tendencia began to tour throughout Latin America during this period. They released the EP La Trampa in 2013. In 2014 they toured Cuba with the German band COR; the tour was documented in a film called Chaos in Cuba. A 2015 performance in Puerto Rico was the topic of another documentary film called Islas del Metal, which also focused on other Latin American metal bands. Later that year Tenencia played in the United States for the first time.

In 2017, Tendencia released the album Cargando Cruces on the Antipop label, and received the prestigious Cuerda Viva Special Award in Cuba. They then curated the Avalanch Festival in Cuba, featuring bands from throughout Latin America. In 2019 they re-signed with Cuba's EGREM label and released the album Añejo XXV which celebrated the band's 25th anniversary. They participated in the Festival Patria Grande to celebrate Cuba's 500 years of history. Tendencia is also the host and curator of the annual Pinar Rock International Festival.

== Discography ==
- Re-Evolution (2001)
- Rebeldes (2005)
- Confidencial (2008)
- La Trampa (EP, 2013)
- Cargando Cruces (2017)
- Añejo XXV (2019)
