= Múr =

Icelandic metal band

- Múr performing in 2026

Background information
- Origin: Reykjavík, Iceland
- Genres: Progressive metal; post-metal
- Years active: 2018–present
- Label: Century Media Records
- Members: Kári Haraldsson; Jón Ísak Ragnarsson; Hilmir Árnason; Ívar Andri Klausen; Árni Jökull Guðbjartsson
- Past members: Sigurður Jakobsson

Múr is an Icelandic metal band formed in 2018. Their musical style has been described as progressive metal and post-metal.

== History ==
Prior to the formation of Múr, future members of the band, Kári Haraldsson and two guitarists, Hilmir Árnason and Jón Ísak Ragnarsson, whom Kári had known since school. Together, they played cover versions of their favorite songs in the garage. Later, the guys entered a music school, where they studied jazz music. There they met future members of the band - drummer Árni Jökull Guðbjartsson and bassist Ívar Andri Klausen. The artists organized Múr in 2018 and in 2021, they participated in the metal band competition Wacken Metal Battle, where they finished in first place in Iceland and fourth at the international stage.

Múr performing in Milan in 2026

On 18 September 2024, Múr released their debut single entitled "Heimsslit". The following month, the band released their second single "Frelsari" and announced they had signed with Century Media Records, as well as announcing their self-titled debut album. On 13 November, Múr released their third single "Holskefla". The band's self-titled album, which is described as a post-metal and progressive metal, was released on 22 November 2024, by Century Media.

== Band members ==
=== Current members ===
- Kári Haraldsson – lead vocals, keyboards (2018–present), drums (2018–2020)
- Jón Ísak Ragnarsson – guitar (2018–present)
- Hilmir Árnason – guitar (2018–present)
- Ívar Andri Klausen – bass (2018–present)
- Árni Jökull Guðbjartsson – drums (2022–present)

=== Former members ===
- Sigurður Jakobsson – drums (2020–2022)

== Discography ==
=== Studio albums ===
List of studio albums
Title	Details
Múr	Released: 22 November 2024; Label: Century Media Records; Format: CD, LP, digital download, streaming

=== Singles ===
Title	Year	Album or EP
"Heimsslit"	2024	Múr
"Frelsari"	2024	Múr
"Holskefla"	2024	Múr
