= Killotine =

Canadian heavy metal band

- Origin: Hamilton, Ontario, Canada
- Genres: Thrash metal; heavy metal
- Years active: 2024–present
- Members: Matt Fraser; Jesse Luciani; James McNeil; JJ Tartaglia
- Past members: James Beck

Killotine is a Canadian heavy metal band formed in 2024 in Hamilton, Ontario, Canada. The band won the 2025 edition of Wacken Metal Battle in Canada, and went to perform at Wacken Open Air shortly after.

== Musical style ==
The band's sound is generally classified as thrash metal and heavy metal. The band have cited Slayer and Metallica as their influences.

== Band members ==
Current

- Matt Fraser – lead vocals, rhythm guitar (2024–present)
- Jesse Luciani – lead guitar (2024–present)
- James McNeil – bass, backing vocals (2024–present)
- JJ Tartaglia – drums (2026–present)

Former

- James Beck – drums (2024–2026)

Session and touring

- Oscar Szablowski – drums (2026)

== Discography ==
EPs

- Live at the Whiskey Pit (2024)
