= Blunt Force Trauma (band) =

American hardcore / thrash metal band

- Origin: Austin, Texas, U.S.
- Genres: Hardcore punk, thrash metal, crossover thrash
- Years active: 1999–present
- Label: Shattered World
- Members: Bobby Fuentes; Felix Griffin; Craig Holloway
- Past members: Ben Burton; Bob Paxton; Alex Rager; Slaytoven

Blunt Force Trauma is an American hardcore punk and thrash metal band from Austin, Texas. They are currently signed to indie label Shattered World Records.

== History ==
Blunt Force Trauma was formed in 1999 in Austin, Texas. The band's line up consisted of vocalist Bobby Fuentes, guitarist Slaytoven, bassist Bob Paxton, and drummer Ben Burton. The band released two albums with Paxton and Burton, Blunt Force Trauma in 2000 and Good Morning America in 2001. Ben Burton left the band in late 2001, and the band went on hiatus shortly after.

In June 2007, the remaining band members reunited and recruited former D.R.I. drummer Felix Griffin to much attention. 2008 would see the band log many shows around Texas, as well as welcoming Alex "Rager" Loughborough on bass in late December 2008. On May 29, 2009, the band released their third album, an EP titled "Hatred for the State", on Shattered World Records. In late 2009, Alex Rager left the band and has been replaced by Craig Holloway.

== Band members ==
Current lineup

- Bobby Fuentes – vocals (1999–present)
- Felix Griffin (aka Big Felix) – drums (2007–present)
- Craig Holloway – bass (2009–present)

Former members

- Ben Burton – drums (1999–2001)
- Bob Paxton – bass (1999–2008)
- Alex Rager – bass (2008–2009)
- Slaytoven – guitars (1999–2017, died in 2017)
