= NadimaČ =

Serbian thrash metal band

- Origin: Belgrade, Serbia
- Genres: Crossover thrash, thrash metal
- Years active: 2003–present
- Labels: Extreme Music
- Members: Danilo "Dača" Trbojević; Stefan "Ćora" Ćorović; Marko "Zec" Pavlović; Dragan "Draganče" Ristić
- Past members: Dušan "Glasna Komora" Koprivica; Miloš "Krle Macola" Krstić
- Website: nadimac.com

NadimaČ is a Serbian crossover thrash band from Belgrade, formed in 2003.

== History ==
Ristić and Pavlović began the band and completed the lineup with guitarist and vocalist, Miloš "Krle Macola" Krstić and Dušan "Glasna Komora" Koprivica. They recorded a demo in 2007, Vukodlak Metal (Werewolf Metal). In early 2008, band changed its lineup. It featured its founding members – Zec and Draganče, guitarist Stefan "Ćora" Ćorović, and a former Daggerspawn vocalist Danilo "Dača" Trbojević. The new lineup recorded a debut EP, Metal je Rat (2009) (Metal Is War). They signed with Chinese record label Area Death Productions and released their first studio album, Državni Neprijatelj Broj Kec (State Enemy Number Ace), in 2009.

== Musical style ==
In his review of the album Besnilo, Dominik Rothe of metal.de described the group's sound as "ultra brutal crossover thrash" and compared them to early Municipal Waste.

== Members ==
Current lineup

- Danilo "Dača" Trbojević – vocals (2008–present)
- Marko "Zec" Pavlović – bass (2003–present)
- Dragan "Draganče" Ristić – drums (2003–present)
- Stefan "Ćora" Ćorović – guitar (2008–present)

== Discography ==
- 2007: Vukodlak Metal (Werewolf Metal)
- 2009: Metal je Rat (Metal is War)
- 2009: Državni Neprijatelj Broj Kec (Public Enemy Number Ace)
- 2011: Po Kratkom Postupku (By a Short Procedure)
- 2013: Nejebanježivesile (Notgivingashit, literal translation "notfuckinganyliveforce")
- 2015: Manifest Protiv Sudbine (Manifest Against Destiny)
- 2017: Besnilo (Rage)
- 2020: Raspad sistema
