= Groove metal =

Subgenre of heavy metal music

- Other names: Neo-thrash, post-thrash, power groove
- Stylistic origins: Thrash metal; tough guy hardcore
- Cultural origins: Late 1980s–early 1990s, New Orleans, New York City, Texas, U.S.
- Derivative forms: Nu metal; metalcore

Local scenes
- New Orleans

Other topics
- List of groove metal bands; NWOAHM; sludge metal; tough guy hardcore; crossover thrash

Groove metal (also known as neo-thrash or post-thrash) is a subgenre of heavy metal music that began in the early 1990s. The genre is primarily derived from thrash metal, but played in slower tempos, and making use of rhythmic guitar parts. It was pioneered in the late 1980s by groups like Exhorder, Prong and Bad Brains, and then popularized by the commercial success of Pantera, White Zombie, Machine Head and Sepultura in the early to mid-1990s.

The genre went on to be influential in the development of the new wave of American heavy metal, nu metal and metalcore. It continued to gain traction in the 2000s with Lamb of God, DevilDriver and Five Finger Death Punch, and 2010s with Killer Be Killed and Bad Wolves.

== Characteristics ==
Groove metal makes use of elements of thrash metal, but plays them in a slower tempo, making use of bouncy, unconventional rhythms. Loudwire stated that "Unlike so many other styles of metal, groove metal is one that doesn't have rigid boundaries and incorporates industrial, death metal, nu-metal, hardcore and a lot more." Music journalist Gary Graff also noted the influence of hardcore punk as integral to groove metal.

== History ==
=== Origins ===
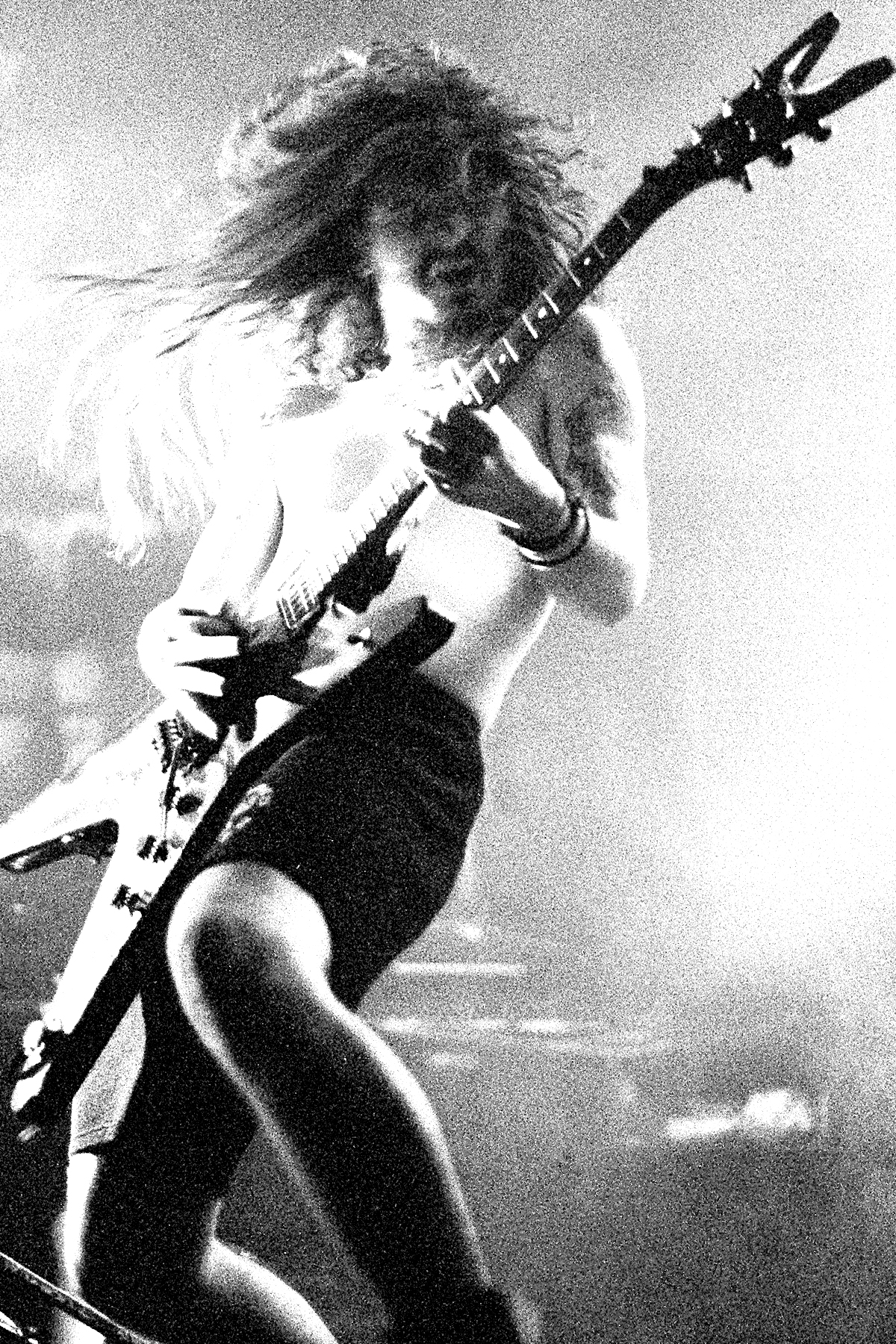
Pantera guitarist Dimebag Darrell, 1991. Pantera is credited with popularizing the groove metal genre.

In their book Hellraisers: A Complete Visual History of Heavy Metal Mayhem, journalists Axl Rosenberg and Christopher Krovatin traced the origins of groove metal to New Orleans' Exhorder and New York's Prong. Exhorder, formed in 1985, recorded their first demo in the summer of 1986, playing a style that was influenced by hardcore punk and metal, as well as jazz, funk, blues and the music of Mardi Gras. The band were immediately influential in the New Orleans metal scene, with pioneering sludge metal bands Eyehategod, Soilent Green and Crowbar all playing some of their earliest live performances in support of them. Prong, on the other hand, originated from the New York hardcore scene. The band originally played crossover thrash before slowing their tempos and incorporating heavier percussion on their second album Beg to Differ (1990). VH1 described the band as having "existed outside of categorical restriction", by having a sound rooted in both punk and metal, while also experimenting with elements of industrial music. A number of writers have also noted the Bad Brains's post-1987 music, particularly Quickness (1989), as helping to pioneer the genre.

White Zombie, formed in 1985, playing music influenced by the noise rock of Honeymoon Killers, Swans and Pussy Galore, 1970s rock of Van Halen, Kiss and AC/DC, as well as Black Sabbath, the Cramps and gothic rock. Their early career was spent playing in the New York City noise rock scene, before being approached by the members of the Cro-Mags and Biohazard to instead begin playing in the New York hardcore scene. During this time, some New York hardcore bands were embracing metal influence and grooves, to the extent that bands including Sick of It All and Leeway self-identified as "Jackson Heights groove metal". White Zombie began leaning into the nascent sound of groove metal on their second album Make Them Die Slowly (1989). The band achieved mainstream success in the mid-1990s, with La Sexorcisto: Devil Music Volume One (1992) peaking at number 2 on the Heatseekers Albums chart in 1993 and was certified double-platinum by the RIAA in July 1998. White Zombie's music videos were featured on Beavis and Butt-Head, helping to increase the band's sales. Their 1995 follow-up Astro Creep: 2000 peaked at number 6 on the Billboard 200 and sold 104,000 copies in its first week of release; it was certified double-platinum by the RIAA. White Zombie's song "More Human than Human" achieved mainstream success in 1995, peaking at number 53 on Billboard's Radio Songs chart, number 7 on the Alternative Songs chart, and number 10 on the Mainstream Rock Songs chart. The song was played frequently on MTV and won the Best Metal/Hard Rock Video award at the 1995 MTV Video Music Awards.

Venice crossover thrash band Excel's second album The Joke's on You (1989) took a more groove-driven direction. Far Out cited the introduction to the track "Tapping into the Emotional Void" as an early example of groove metal.

Texas heavy metal band Pantera's 1990 album Cowboys from Hell is often considered the album that codified and popularized groove metal. They continued releasing influential albums through the 1990s; the 1992 album Vulgar Display of Power featured an even heavier sound than its predecessor, while its follow-up Far Beyond Driven (1994) peaked at number 1 on the Billboard 200, selling 186,000 copies its first week of release.

Thrash pioneers Metallica's Black Album (1991) included multiple groove metal tracks, including "Sad but True" and "The Struggle Within". Brazilian band Sepultura, previously established as having a deathrash sound, released their fifth studio album Chaos A.D. in 1993, which saw the band slow their tempos and embrace the influence of New York hardcore acts like the Cro-Mags, Agnostic Front and Sick of It All. Sound of the Beast author Ian Christe credited Chaos A.D. with helping to developing groove metal and as being widely influential. Machine Head released their debut album Burn My Eyes in 1994. The album helped the band achieve underground success and sold over 145,000 copies.

=== Developments ===
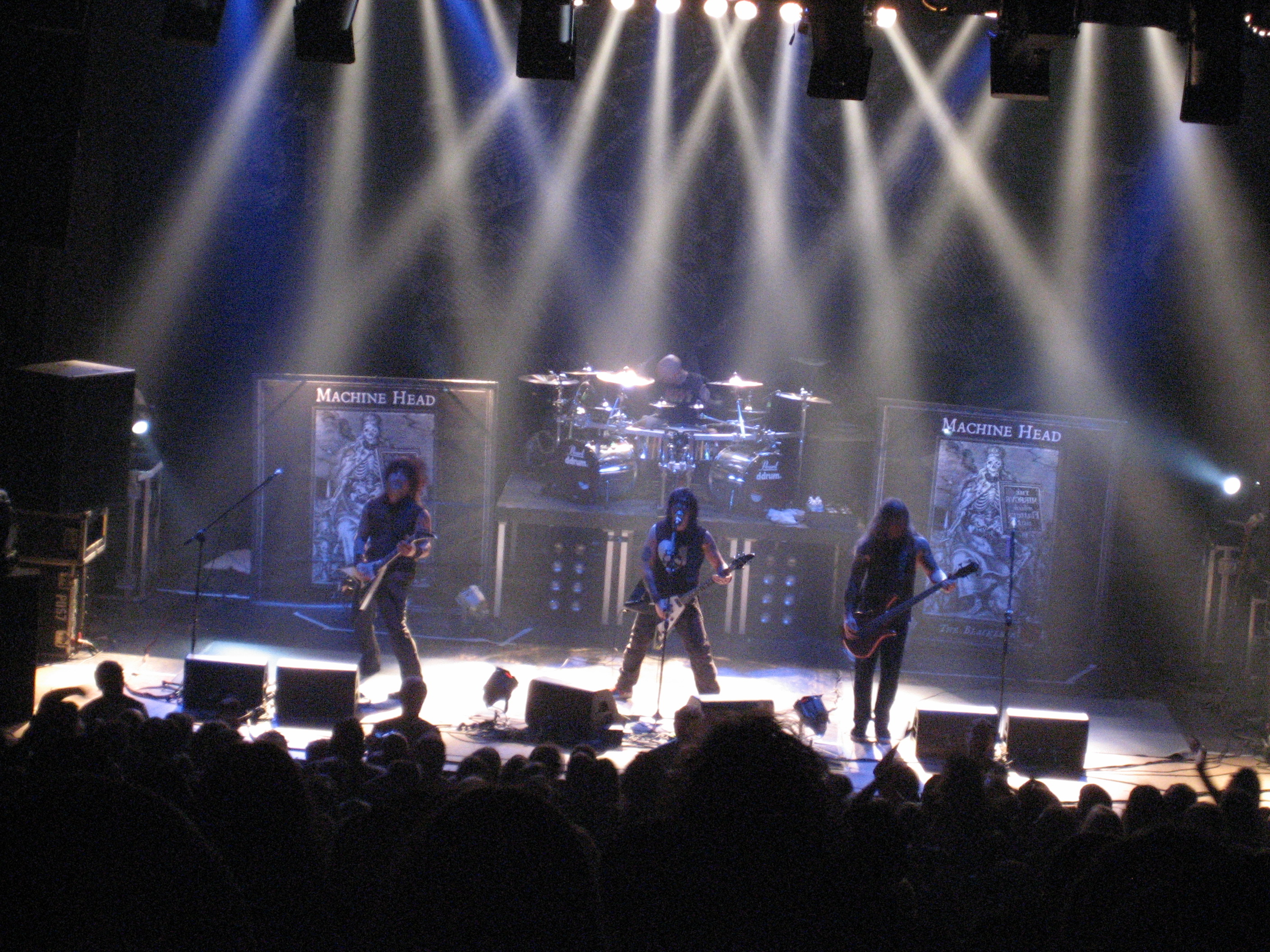
Machine Head performing in 2007

Following the widespread success of Pantera, White Zombie and Machine Head, the genre expanded with notable subsequent groups including Skinlab, Pissing Razors, Grip Inc., Merauder, Pro-Pain, GZR, and Stuck Mojo. Additionally, several veteran thrash bands began to change their sound in favour of groove metal. Foremost among this trend were the releases of Sacred Reich's Independent (1993), Overkill's I Hear Black (1993), Coroner's Grin (1993), Testament's Low (1994), Forbidden's Distortion (1994), Kreator's Cause for Conflict (1995), and much of Annihilator's 1990s output, as well as Anthrax's albums from the John Bush-era (1992–2005).

In the 2000s, a second wave of groove metal bands emerged, including Damageplan, Lamb of God, Chimaira and DevilDriver. Damageplan was founded in 2003 by the Abbott brothers, Dimebag Darrell and Vinnie Paul, just before Pantera broke up. They released one album, New Found Power, in the following year. The band broke up in December 2004, after guitarist Dimebag Darrell was shot dead at a live performance. One of the most commercially successful groove metal groups during this time was Five Finger Death Punch, who formed in 2005 and garnered extensive chart positions and album certifications of gold and platinum in the United States. Vinnie Paul's post-Damageplan band Hellyeah, which was formed in 2006, also saw commercial success. The 2010s saw the formation of Killer Be Killed and Bad Wolves. Malevolence's third studio album Malicious Intent (2022), saw widespread success and included the influence of groove metal and sludge metal into beatdown hardcore and metalcore. Metal Hammer cited them as a definitive groove metal act.

== Influence on other genres ==
The groove metal genre was a driving force in the New Wave of American Heavy Metal movement, which began in the 1990s. Additionally, it influenced the development and success of nu metal and metalcore, two of the most commercially successful subsequent metal genres. VH1 called groove metal "a musical purgatory that bridged the gap between classic thrash-y heavy metal and angst-y, down-tuned modern metal of the 21st century."

== See also ==
- List of groove metal bands
- New wave of American heavy metal
- Tough guy hardcore
- Sludge metal
- Nu metal
