= CKY discography =

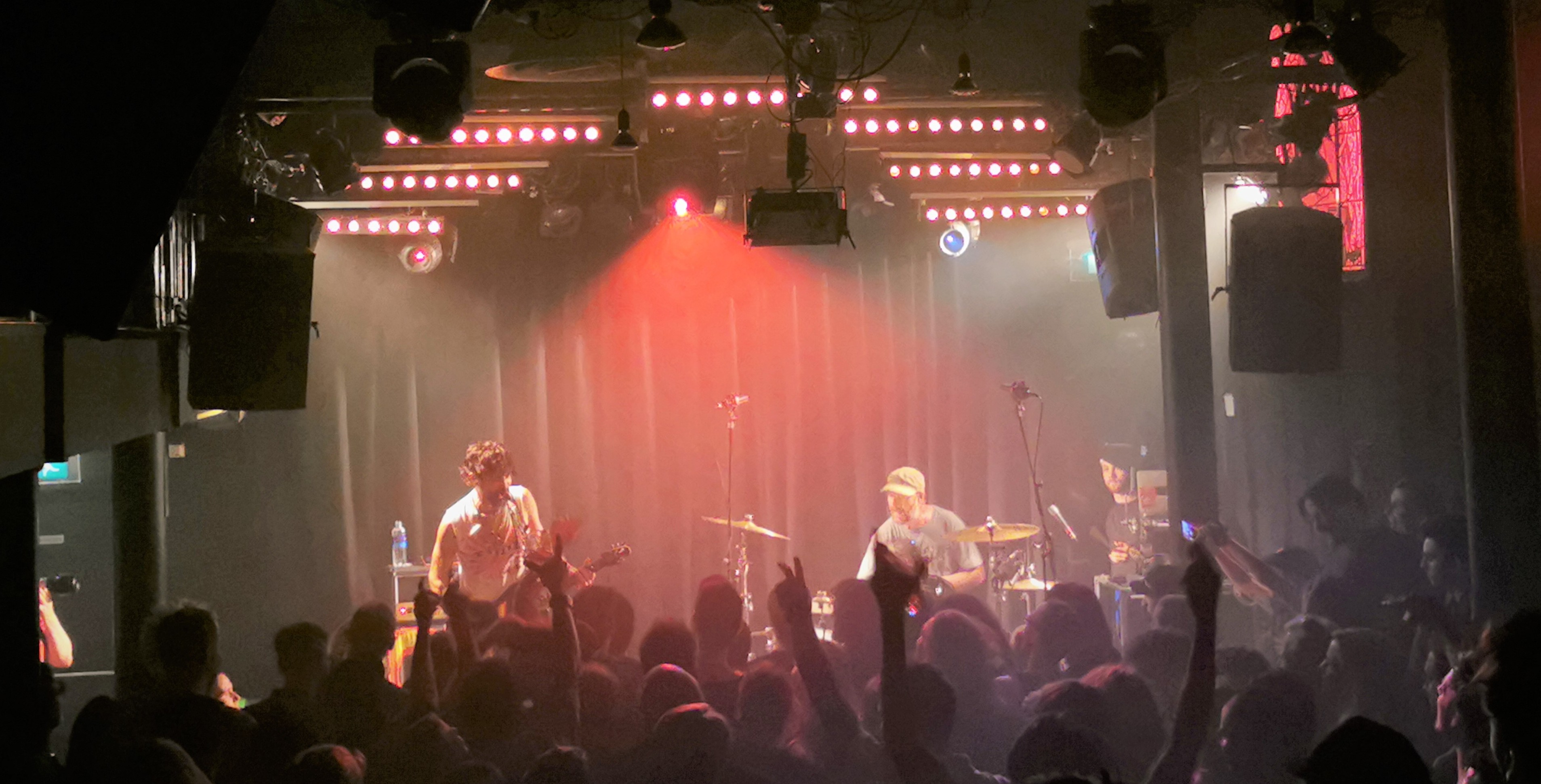
- CKY performing in 2019
- Studio albums: 5
- Extended plays: 4
- Live albums: 2
- Compilation albums: 4
- Singles: 16
- Video albums: 1
- Music videos: 18

CKY is an American rock band from West Chester, Pennsylvania. Formed in 1998 by Deron Miller, Chad I Ginsburg and Jess Margera, the group released its first two albums Volume 1 and Volume 2 (a compilation of songs and skits from the first CKY video) on Teil Martin/Distant Recordings in 1999, supported by lead single "96 Quite Bitter Beings". After signing with Island/Def Jam, the band followed their debuts up in 2002 with Infiltrate•Destroy•Rebuild, which was their first release to chart when it reached number 99 on the US Billboard 200 and number 108 on the UK Albums Chart. Lead single "Familiar Realm" reached the US Mainstream Rock top 40. In 2005, CKY issued An Answer Can Be Found and reached number 35 of the Billboard 200, with "Familiar Realm" peaking at number 32 on the Mainstream Rock chart.

With Matt Deis added as its first full-time bassist, CKY signed with Roadrunner Records in 2006 and released Carver City in 2009. The album reached number 46 on the US Billboard 200, number 4 on the Top Hard Rock Albums chart, and number 14 on the Top Rock Albums chart. In March 2011, the group released its first career-retrospective album B-Sides & Rarities, followed by B-Sides & Rarities Volume II later in the year. After continued tensions between band members, frontman Deron Miller left CKY in 2011; he was replaced by Daniel Davies for a number of shows in 2012 and later in 2015, before the group went on an extended hiatus.

CKY returned in 2016 with Ginsburg taking over lead vocals, signing with Entertainment One Music and releasing The Phoenix in 2017. The album was the band's first since its debut not to chart on the Billboard 200, although it did reach the top 20 of the Independent Albums chart. The limited edition EP Too Precious to Kill was released in 2018 to support Record Store Day, featuring four new tracks. In 2020, the group released a livestreamed show dubbed fuCKYou 2020 on vinyl.

== Albums ==
=== Studio albums ===
List of studio albums with selected chart positions
Title	Album details	Peak chart positions								
Title	Album details	US	US Curr.	US Hard	US Indie	US Rock	AUS	SCO	UK	UK Rock
Volume 1	Released: February 27, 1999; Label: Distant/Teil Martin; Format: CD	—	—	—	—	—	—	—	—	—
Infiltrate•Destroy•Rebuild	Released: September 24, 2002; Label: Island; Format: CD+	99	—	—	—	—	—	—	108	10
An Answer Can Be Found	Released: June 28, 2005; Label: Island; Format: CD+	35	—	—	—	—	—	93	102	7
Carver City	Released: May 19, 2009; Label: Roadrunner; Formats: CD, LP, DL	46	—	4	—	14	98	—	119	7
The Phoenix	Released: June 16, 2017; Label: Entertainment One; Formats: CD, LP, DL	—	98	—	19	—	—	—	—	—
New Reason to Dream	Released: TBA; Label: Self-released; Formats:	—	—	—	—	—	—	—	—	—
"—" denotes a release that did not register on that chart.

=== Live albums ===
List of live albums
Title	Album details
Live at Mr. Smalls Theatre	Released: October 31, 2007; Label: Distant; Formats: CD, DL
fuCKYou 2020	Released: December 29, 2020; Label: none (self-released); Format: 2LP, CD

=== Compilations ===
List of compilation albums
Title	Album details
Volume 2	Released: February 27, 1999; Label: Distant/Teil Martin; Format: CD
B-Sides & Rarities	Released: March 22, 2011; Label: Distant/Mighty Loud; Formats: CD, LP, DL
B-Sides & Rarities Volume II	Released: October 3, 2011; Label: Distant; Formats: CD, DL
The Best of CKY	Released: 2015; Label: Distant; Format: LP, CD

== Extended plays ==
List of extended plays
Title	EP details
Disengage the Simulator	Released: July 2000; Label: Volcom; Format: CD
Hellview	Released: April 2003; Label: Island; Format: 7" vinyl
Live on West Chester University Radio 1999	Released: September 20, 2011; Label: Distant; Formats: CD, DL
Too Precious to Kill	Released: November 23, 2018; Label: Entertainment One; Format: 12" vinyl

== Singles ==
List of singles with selected chart positions, year released and album name
Title	Year	Peaks		Album
Title	Year	US Act.	US Main.	Album
"96 Quite Bitter Beings"	1999	—	—	Volume 1
"Flesh into Gear"	2002	38	38	Infiltrate•Destroy•Rebuild
"Familiar Realm"	2005	31	32	An Answer Can Be Found
"Hellions on Parade"	2009	—	—	Carver City
"A#1 Roller Rager"	2009	—	—	Carver City
"96 Quite Bitter Beings" (remastered)	2010	—	—	non-album single
"Afterworld"	2011	—	—	B-Sides & Rarities
"3D" (instrumental)	2011	—	—	B-Sides & Rarities Volume II
"Step to CKY" (instrumental)	2011	—	—	B-Sides & Rarities Volume II
"All My Friends Are Dead" (Fuckface Unstoppable with CKY)	2013	—	—	non-album single
"Days of Self Destruction" (featuring Brent Hinds)	2017	—	—	The Phoenix
"Replaceable"	2017	—	—	The Phoenix
"Head for a Breakdown"	2017	—	—	The Phoenix
"Fuck.Shit.Help. & Yeah" (featuring Hank von Hell and Anders Odden)	2021	—	—	non-album singles
"Lost in Departures" (featuring Daniel Davies and Per Wiberg)	2021	—	—	non-album singles
"Can't Stop Running"	2025	—	—	non-album singles
"Beware of the Heartless" (featuring Brent Hinds)	2026	—	—	non-album singles
"—" denotes a release that did not register on that chart.

== Videos ==
=== Video albums ===
List of video albums with selected chart positions
Title	Album details	Peak
Title	Album details	US
Infiltrate•Destroy•Rebuild: The Video Album	Released: November 18, 2003; Label: Island; Format: 2×DVD	34

=== Music videos ===
List of music videos, showing year released and director(s)
Title	Year	Director(s)	Ref.
"96 Quite Bitter Beings"	2000	Bam Margera	
"Disengage the Simulator"	2002	Bam Margera	
"Attached at the Hip"	2002	Bam Margera	
"Close Yet Far"	2002	Bam Margera	
"Escape from Hellview"	2002	Bam Margera	
"Flesh into Gear"	2002	Bam Margera	
"Frenetic Amnesic"	2002	Bam Margera	
"Inhuman Creation Station"	2002	Dave Denenn, Rob Shaw	
"Plastic Plan"	2002	Bam Margera	
"Shock & Terror"	2002	Bam Margera	
"Sink into the Underground"	2002	Bam Margera	
"Sporadic Movement"	2002	Bam Margera	
"Familiar Realm"	2005	Matt Lenski	
"A#1 Roller Rager"	2009	Bam Margera	
"Afterworld"	2010	Bam Margera	
"Days of Self Destruction"	2017	Bobby Bates	
"Replaceable"	2017	Matthew Joffe	
"Head for a Breakdown"	2017	Elena Costa, Sophia Costa	
"Wiping Off the Dead"	2018	Dave Causa	
"Can't Stop Running"	2025	Elena Costa, Sophia Costa	
