= Acoustified! =

Studio album by Deron Miller
- Released: December 9, 2013
- Genre: Acoustic; alternative rock
- Length: 57:02
- Label: Distant
- Producer: Deron Miller

Singles from Acoustified!
- 1. "Dressed in Decay" Released: June 2, 2013

Acoustified! is the first solo studio album by American rock musician Deron Miller. Released on December 9, 2013, by Distant Recordings, it features acoustic recordings of songs by Miller's bands CKY, Foreign Objects and Oil, as well as a number of other cover versions. The recording of the album was funded by Indiegogo, and the release was preceded by the single "Dressed in Decay".

== Background ==
Acoustified! was produced by Miller and recorded, engineered, mixed and mastered by Stephen Petree. The recording and production of the album was funded through the crowdfunding website Indiegogo, on which Miller was asking for $8,000 funding. Total funding reached over $13,000 by the end of the campaign, with over 300 backers contributing to the project.

The artwork for Acoustified! was produced by Travis Smith, who had previously produced the artwork for CKY's 2009 studio album Carver City. All of the Indiegogo backers for the album were credited in the liner notes as "executive producers". The album was released digitally on December 9, 2013, with a limited run of 500 copies printed on CD.

Prior to the release of the album, the recording of "Dressed in Decay" was released to Indiegogo backers when the campaign reached $5,000 in donations. It was later released as the only single from the album in June 2013, backed with an instrumental version of the recording. Several songs were also released as exclusive bonus tracks for backers.

Acoustified! was later reissued in September 2014 featuring a number of previously unreleased recordings – CKY's "Behind the Screams", "As the Tables Turn" and "...And She Never Returned", Oil's "Drying Up", and World Under Blood's "Into the Arms of Cruelty".

== Track listing ==
All tracks are written by Deron Miller, except where noted

Original 2013 version
No.	Title	Original artist	Length
1.	"96 Quite Bitter Beings"	CKY	4:01
2.	"Disengage the Simulator"	CKY	3:20
3.	"The Way You Lived"	CKY	3:49
4.	"Dressed in Decay"	CKY	4:03
5.	"Sometimes" (written by Kevin Shields)	My Bloody Valentine	4:18
6.	"Thanks for the Ride"	Oil	3:52
7.	"No One Hears"	Oil	3:00
8.	"Victory Over Neptune"	Foreign Objects	3:57
9.	"Stripped Your Speech"	CKY	3:23
10.	"Sara's Mask"	CKY	4:56
11.	"A#1 Roller Rager"	CKY	4:20
12.	"The Boardwalk Body"	CKY	3:30
13.	"Shock & Terror"	CKY	3:17
14.	"Be Like Me"	Oil	4:03
15.	"The Era of an End"	CKY	3:13
Total length:			57:02

Indiegogo backer bonus tracks
No.	Title	Original artist	Length
16.	"Lost in a Contraption"	CKY	3:39
17.	"In My Darkest Hour" (written by Dave Mustaine and David Ellefson)	Megadeth	5:39
18.	"See You Tonite" (written by Gene Simmons)	Gene Simmons	2:39
19.	"Flesh into Gear"	CKY	3:10
Total length:			72:09

2014 reissue
No.	Title	Original artist	Length
1.	"96 Quite Bitter Beings"	CKY	4:06
2.	"Disengage the Simulator"	CKY	3:20
3.	"The Way You Lived"	CKY	3:49
4.	"Dressed in Decay"	CKY	4:03
5.	"Sometimes" (written by Kevin Shields)	My Bloody Valentine	4:18
6.	"In My Darkest Hour" (written by Dave Mustaine and David Ellefson)	Megadeth	5:39
7.	"No One Hears"	Oil	3:00
8.	"Victory Over Neptune"	Foreign Objects	3:57
9.	"Stripped Your Speech"	CKY	3:23
10.	"Sara's Mask"	CKY	4:56
11.	"A#1 Roller Rager"	CKY	4:20
12.	"Behind the Screams"	CKY	1:29
13.	"As the Tables Turn"	CKY	4:16
14.	"The Boardwalk Body"	CKY	3:30
15.	"Drying Up"	Oil	3:07
16.	"...And She Never Returned"	CKY	3:47
17.	"Into the Arms of Cruelty"	World Under Blood	5:41
18.	"Lost in a Contraption"	CKY	3:34
19.	"Close Yet Far"	CKY	3:55
20.	"The Era of an End"	CKY	3:13
Total length:			77:23

== Personnel ==
- Deron Miller – vocals, guitar, bass, production
- Stephen Petree – recording, engineering, mixing, mastering
- Travis Smith – artwork, design
- Phil Bowman – layout
- Sam Evans – additional layout
