= Hellions on Parade =

Single by CKY

from the album Carver City
- Released: April 20, 2009
- Genre: Heavy metal; alternative metal
- Length: 3:40
- Label: Roadrunner
- Songwriter(s): Deron Miller; Chad I Ginsburg; Jess Margera
- Producer(s): Chad I Ginsburg

CKY singles chronology
"Familiar Realm" (2005)	"Hellions on Parade" (2009)	"A#1 Roller Rager" (2009)

"Hellions on Parade" is a song by American rock band CKY. Written by Deron Miller and Chad I Ginsburg, it was featured on the band's 2009 fourth studio album, Carver City. "Hellions on Parade" is the third song in the band's "Hellview" song trilogy, succeeding "96 Quite Bitter Beings" and "Escape from Hellview". It was released as the first single from Carver City on April 20, 2009.

== Recording and music ==
Vocalist, guitarist and primary songwriter Deron Miller has revealed that he recorded the vocals for "Hellions on Parade" alone in Santa Monica, California (at 4th Street Recording, according to the liner notes for Carver City), amid tensions between members of the band. Speaking about the musical style of the track, he noted that it contains "really cool keyboard lines ... and it turned out really heavy".

== Lyrical content ==
"Hellions on Parade" was written as the third entry in the band's "Hellview" song trilogy, which started with "96 Quite Bitter Beings" (from 1999's Volume 1) and "Escape from Hellview" (from 2002's Infiltrate•Destroy•Rebuild). According to Miller, "Hellview" is a story "about a town that doesn't take kindly to outsiders", and the story of the third song in the trilogy "is about Hellview destroying its rival city".

== Promotion and release ==
The opening track on Carver City, "Hellions on Parade" was released as a digital download single on April 20, 2009. In 2015, it was included on the reissue of the compilation album The Best of CKY.

== Critical reception ==
In a review of the album Carver City for the website PopMatters, Lana Cooper praised "Hellions on Parade" for its "finely-tuned production and songwriting elements", highlighting the "chugging guitar riffs" and presence of keyboards, which she assured added to the song's "eerie atmosphere".

The song was featured on the soundtrack of the EA Sports Hockey game NHL 10.
