= Infiltrate Destroy Rebuild: The Video Album =

Video by CKY
- Released: November 18, 2003
- Genre: Alternative metal; alternative rock; stoner rock
- Length: 4:27:59
- Label: Island
- Director: Bam Margera; Dave Denenn; Chad I Ginsburg
- Producer: Joe Frantz; Erin Alexander

CKY video chronology
| Infiltrate Destroy Rebuild: The Video Album (2003) | Live at Mr. Smalls Funhouse (2006) |

Infiltrate Destroy Rebuild: The Video Album, stylized using bullets, is the first video album by American rock band CKY. Directed by Bam Margera and produced by Joe Frantz, it was released on November 18, 2003, via Island Records. The album features music videos for all ten tracks from the band's second studio album Infiltrate Destroy Rebuild, as well as behind-the-scenes features, older music videos and a documentary.

== Background ==
Disc one of Infiltrate Destroy Rebuild: The Video Album features music videos and behind the scenes videos for all ten songs on Infiltrate Destroy Rebuild, CKY's 2002 second studio album. Additionally, it also features music videos for two older songs, Volume 1 tracks "96 Quite Bitter Beings" and "Disengage the Simulator", as well as a photo gallery.

Disc two features a documentary entitled "CKY: Chopped & Sliced". Running at almost three hours long, the documentary features footage filmed by various people associated with the band, including guitarist Chad I Ginsburg, drummer Jess Margera's brother Bam and photographer Ryan Gee, and is made up of what Jess Margera describes as "tons of behind-the-scenes footage and backstage and tour stuff". Some of the footage is said to have been filmed on the 2003 Out on the Noose Again tour.

All ten music videos were directed by Bam Margera and produced by CKY crew member Joe Frantz, with the exception of "Inhuman Creation Station", which was directed by Dave Denenn (with animation by Rob Shaw). "CKY: Chopped & Sliced" was directed by Ginsburg, with assistance from then-bassist Vernon Zaborowski, and produced by Erin Alexander.

== Production ==
Speaking about the album in a 2003 interview with music reviewer Mark Prindle, Jess Margera explained that the videos on the album were recorded "over about the course of a year and a half", praising his brother's work as director and describing the videos as "insane". He also praised Denenn for his work on "Inhuman Creation Station", claiming that the animation on the video "looks better than [The] Nightmare Before Christmas". Speaking about the production of the video, Margera noted that Denenn produced the video in return for a low rate as he "just [wanted] to make a name for himself", and claimed that he "worked on it every day for 17 hours a day, with him and a crew of about four or five people, for a month and a half straight".

The music videos on the album feature a number of visual themes, but largely consist of performance footage. Themes in the videos include many elements present in the band's music and related projects (such as the CKY video series), including horror (in the form of murder on "Escape from Hellview" and injury on "Shock & Terror") and skateboarding (on "Flesh into Gear" and "Sink into the Underground"). Actress Misty Mundae appears in the "Shock & Terror" video.

== Reception ==
Writing for the website ReadJunk.com, Bryan Kremkau proposed that Infiltrate Destroy Rebuild: The Video Album "confirmed the band's visionary instincts", praising Bam Margera's contribution to the album in the form of "professional" and "masterly" editing. Chad Connolly of website The Movies Made Me Do It was similarly positive, awarding the album a rating of ten out of ten and praising elements such as the bonus documentary and behind the scenes videos.

== Track listing ==
All videos directed by Bam Margera, except where noted.

Disc one: music videos
| No. | Title | Length |
|---|---|---|
| 1. | "Intro" | 0:07 |
| 2. | "Escape from Hellview Behind the Scenes" | 5:26 |
| 3. | "Escape from Hellview" | 3:44 |
| 4. | "Flesh into Gear Behind the Scenes" | 2:43 |
| 5. | "Flesh into Gear" | 3:02 |
| 6. | "Sink into the Underground Behind the Scenes" | 3:58 |
| 7. | "Sink into the Underground" | 2:57 |
| 8. | "Attached at the Hip Behind the Scenes" | 1:48 |
| 9. | "Attached at the Hip" | 2:59 |
| 10. | "Frenetic Amnesic Behind the Scenes" | 2:25 |
| 11. | "Frenetic Amnesic" | 3:51 |
| 12. | "Shock & Terror Behind the Scenes" | 3:58 |
| 13. | "Shock & Terror" | 3:07 |
| 14. | "Plastic Plan Behind the Scenes" | 1:09 |
| 15. | "Plastic Plan" | 3:53 |
| 16. | "Inhuman Creation Station Behind the Scenes" | 3:51 |
| 17. | "Inhuman Creation Station" (directed by Margera and Dave Denenn) | 4:08 |
| 18. | "Sporadic Movement Behind the Scenes" | 1:11 |
| 19. | "Sporadic Movement" | 2:42 |
| 20. | "Close Yet Far Behind the Scenes" | 2:22 |
| 21. | "Close Yet Far" | 3:48 |
| 22. | "Credits" | 0:53 |
| 23. | Untitled | 5:08 |
| Total length: | | 1:19:10 |

Disc one: special features
| No. | Title | Length |
|---|---|---|
| 24. | "Disengage the Simulator" | 3:03 |
| 25. | "96 Quite Bitter Beings" | 3:29 |
| 26. | "Photo Gallery" | 4:39 |
| 27. | "Photo Gallery" | 0:57 |
| Total length: | | 12:07 |

Disc two
| No. | Title | Length |
|---|---|---|
| 1. | "CKY: Chopped & Sliced" (directed by Chad I Ginsburg with Vernon Zaborowski) | 2:56:42 |
| Total length: | | 2:56:42 |

== Personnel ==
Music videos

- Deron Miller – performance
- Chad I Ginsburg – performance
- Jess Margera – performance
- Vernon Zaborowski – performance
- Bam Margera – film direction, editing
- Joe Frantz – production, cinematography, editing
- Jim Burt – post-production
- Efrain Torres – mixing
- Joe Capriglione – filming ("Inhuman Creation Station Behind the Scenes")
- Dave Denenn – direction ("Inhuman Creation Station")
- Rob Shaw – animation ("Inhuman Creation Station")
- R. Scott Purcell – production design ("Inhuman Creation Station")
- Monique Ligones – miniatures ("Inhuman Creation Station")

Documentary

- Chad I Ginsburg – direction and filming
- Vernon Zaborowski – direction assistance and filming
- Bam Margera – filming
- Bill Whirity – filming
- Fritz – filming
- Jeremiah "The Cawz" – filming
- Joe Frantz – filming
- Matt "Matty J" Janaitis – filming
- Netti – filming
- Ryan Gee – filming
- Ryan Spevak – filming
- Steve Haegele – filming
- Erin Alexander – production
- Chris Burkhalter – editing
- Nadav Streett – editing
- Jina Dierolf – post-production and artwork

Other personnel

- Chad I Ginsburg – package design
- Jina Dierolf – package design
- Adam Wallacavage – photography
- Adam Mecchi – online editing
