= 96 Quite Bitter Beings =

Single by CKY

from the album Volume 1
- Released: 1999
- Genre: Stoner rock; alternative metal
- Length: 3:22
- Label: Distant
- Songwriter: Deron Miller
- Producer: Chad I Ginsburg

CKY singles chronology
| "96 Quite Bitter Beings" (1999) | "Flesh into Gear" (2002) |

"96 Quite Bitter Beings" is the debut single by American rock band CKY. Written by the band's lead vocalist and guitarist Deron Miller, it was produced by the band's lead guitarist and backing vocalist Chad I Ginsburg and featured as the opening track on the band's 1999 debut studio album Volume 1. The song was also released as the album's only single in 1999. Despite not charting, it is considered to be CKY's most famous song and has been featured on a number of external releases.

== Background and release ==
As with the rest of the Volume 1 album, "96 Quite Bitter Beings" was written by CKY frontman Deron Miller, and was reportedly conceived during an afternoon on which he decided not to go to work. Speaking about the song in 2015, Miller noted that it was the last to be written for the album, and that he came up with the riff at drummer Jess Margera's house after their regular rehearsal space had been flooded. Later pressings of Volume 1 co-credited the writing of the song (and the album) to Miller, Margera and guitarist Chad I Ginsburg, although the frontman upholds that this was a merely "cosmetic" measure.

"96 Quite Bitter Beings" is the first CKY song in the "Hellview" series, a trilogy which tells "a story about a town that doesn't take kindly to outsiders" and continued with "Escape from Hellview" on 2002's Infiltrate•Destroy•Rebuild and later "Hellions on Parade" on 2009's Carver City. After its release on Volume 1 and as a single in 1999, the track was included on the two-track extended play (EP) Hellview along with the second entry "Escape from Hellview" in 2003. On December 28, 2010, the band released a remastered version of the song as a digital download, backed with live recordings of An Answer Can Be Found tracks "Dressed in Decay" and "All Power to Slaves", and Volume 1 track "To All of You". In 2015, it was included on the limited edition vinyl compilation album The Best of CKY.

== Reception and legacy ==
"96 Quite Bitter Beings" has generally been praised by music critics and fans since its original release. In a review of Volume 1 for Slant Magazine, Aaron Scott proposed that the track showcases "CKY sounding their best", offering the following description of the song: "the guitars stomp on your face, the drums alternately ride on the downbeat and hi-hat on the offbeat, while the vocals switch back and forth from matching the intensity of the riff to wooing us to sleep". Similarly, AllMusic's Bret Love identified the track as one of the highlights of the album, crediting the rotation of the song's music video on MTV for the band's early mainstream success.

The members of CKY themselves have also described "96 Quite Bitter Beings" as "one of the band's most popular tracks". According to set list aggregation website setlist.fm, it is the most popular song played at CKY concerts. The track also appeared on the 2001 video game Tony Hawk's Pro Skater 3, with British music magazine NME describing it as "so intrinsically linked to 1990s skate culture". The "Shopping Carts" stunt skit filmed by the CKY crew, which was aired in the first episode of Jackass, had the song playing at the background. The main guitar riff of the song was sampled by rapper Bazaar Royale on the song "What's It All For?", released in 2003 on the Cradle 2 the Grave soundtrack. After his departure from CKY in 2011, Miller formed a new band called 96 Bitter Beings. The song was also featured in the soundtrack of the 2021 Netflix documentary Untold: Crimes & Penalties.

== Music video ==
The music video for "96 Quite Bitter Beings" was directed by Bam Margera, brother of drummer Jess, and released in the week of December 4, 2000. The video was later released, alongside "Disengage the Simulator", on the band's 2003 video album Infiltrate•Destroy•Rebuild: The Video Album. Writing a review of the album for the website The Movies Made Me Do It, Chad Connolly noted that the video is "pretty low-budget" but nonetheless "visually appealing".

== Track listing ==
Original 1999 edition
| No. | Title | Writer(s) | Length |
|---|---|---|---|
| 1. | "96 Quite Bitter Beings" | Deron Miller | 3:21 |
| Total length: | | | 3:21 |

Digital download edition
| No. | Title | Writer(s) | Length |
|---|---|---|---|
| 1. | "96 Quite Bitter Beings" | Miller | 3:21 |
| 2. | "Rio Bravo" (1997 demo) | Miller | 2:56 |
| 3. | "Knee Deep" (1996 demo) | Miller | 3:41 |
| Total length: | | | 9:58 |

2010 remastered edition
| No. | Title | Writer(s) | Length |
|---|---|---|---|
| 1. | "96 Quite Bitter Beings" | Miller | 3:24 |
| 2. | "Dressed in Decay" (live) | Miller; Chad I Ginsburg; Jess Margera | 3:05 |
| 3. | "All Power to Slaves" (live) | Miller; Ginsburg; Margera | 3:45 |
| 4. | "To All of You" (live) | Miller | 4:41 |
| Total length: | | | 14:55 |

== Personnel ==
- Deron Miller – vocals, rhythm guitar, bass
- Chad I Ginsburg – lead guitar
- Jess Margera – drums
