= Hellview =

EP by CKY
- Released: April 2003
- Genre: Alternative metal, alternative rock
- Length: 7:05
- Label: Island
- Producer: Chad I Ginsburg; Deron Miller; Jess Margera

CKY chronology
Infiltrate•Destroy• Rebuild (2002)	Hellview (2003)	Familiar Realm (2005)

Hellview is the second extended play (EP) by American rock band CKY. Released in April 2003 by Island Records and limited to 2,200 copies, the EP contains "96 Quite Bitter Beings" and "Escape from Hellview", from the band's first two studio albums Volume 1 and Infiltrate•Destroy•Rebuild, respectively.

== Track listing ==
All tracks are written by Deron Miller, Chad I Ginsburg and Jess Margera

No.	Title	Length
1.	"96 Quite Bitter Beings"	3:24
2.	"Escape from Hellview"	3:41
Total length:		7:05

== Personnel ==
- Deron Miller – vocals, guitar, bass, production assistance
- Chad I Ginsburg – guitars, bass, production, recording, mixing
- Jess Margera – drums, production assistance on track 1
