= Rock n Roll Alibis =

Studio album by CiG
- Released: July 7, 2015
- Recorded: 2014–2015
- Studio: Studio CIG LA (Los Angeles, California)
- Genre: Alternative rock; heavy metal; alternative metal; hard rock
- Length: 33:40
- Label: Generation Overdone
- Producer: Chad I Ginsburg

Rock n Roll Alibis is the debut solo album by American alternative rock musician Chad I Ginsburg (CiG), best known as the guitarist and vocalist of the band CKY. Recorded at Ginsburg's home-based Studio CiG LA in Los Angeles, California, it was released on his own label Generation Overdone Records on July 7, 2015. All material on the album was written, performed, produced, recorded, mixed and mastered by Ginsburg ("Dead to You" credits two co-writers).

== Background ==
Ginsburg started working on his first solo album after a failed attempt at reconciling with former CKY bandmate Deron Miller in early 2014. He worked on writing songs for the project for "nearly a year" and claimed that he ended up with enough material for multiple albums. For the recording of the album, Ginsburg claimed that he approached the process differently than he had in the past, starting with tracking bass lines rather than "lyric phrases and melody, then guitar".

Rock n Roll Alibis was officially announced on June 4, 2015, with the release of a trailer titled "The Interrogation" featuring a short clip of closing track "Murder Is Sympathy", which sees two police detectives (portrayed by Mike Capes and Rob Valletta) interrogating Ginsburg about the album. A second trailer titled "Mind of a Warrior" was released on June 19 and features a clip of an instrumental version of the track "Dead to You". The album was released on July 7, 2015.

CiG promoted his solo debut on a North American concert tour beginning in August 2015. Joining him in the band were bassist Ronnie Elvis James and drummer Dennis Morehouse. In 2021, Ginsburg remastered and reissued the album on digital streaming platforms with a previously unreleased track, "DTW".

== Track listing ==
All tracks are written by Chad I Ginsburg.

No.	Title	Length
1.	"Alive with Overdrive"	3:23
2.	"Dead to You"	4:26
3.	"Beyond the Barricade"	4:26
4.	"Somethin' to Hide"	4:33
5.	"Ubeta Ugahta"	3:35
6.	"Rock Survivors"	4:41
7.	"Up on the Mountaintop"	4:09
8.	"Murder Is Sympathy"	4:27
Total length:		33:40

2021 digital deluxe edition
No.	Title	Length
1.	"Alive with Overdrive"	3:23
2.	"Beyond the Barricade"	4:26
3.	"Dead to You"	4:26
4.	"Something to Hide"	4:33
5.	"Up on the Mountaintop"	4:09
6.	"Rock Survivors"	4:41
7.	"Ubeta Ugahta"	3:35
8.	"Murder Is Sympathy"	4:26
9.	"DTW" (previously unreleased outtake)	3:47
Total length:		37:27

Notes

- "Dead to You" features additional contributions by Armin Peterson and Albert Garrett.

== Personnel ==
Credits adapted from the album's liner notes.

- Chad I Ginsburg – vocals, guitars, bass, synthesizers, percussion, production, recording, mixing, mastering
- Stik I Gizzards (Chad I Ginsburg) – drums
- Ryan Harris – artwork
- Vasily Pavdun – photography
- Sam Evans – logo design
