= Rudy & Blitz =

American rock band

Rudy & Blitz (also spelled Rudy + Blitz) was a rock band formed by American musicians Chad Ginsburg and Dave Kloos in Bucks County near Philadelphia in the 1990s.

Rudy & Blitz were signed to Ruffhouse/Columbia. Ginsburg went on to join CKY.

== Members ==
- Chad Ginsburg – guitars, vocals
- Dave Kloos – lead vocals, bass
- Dante Cimino – drums, vocals

== Discography ==
- 1995: Thanks Anyway (7" vinyl)
- 1997: Reverb on the Click (re-released 2003)
- 2009: Distant Recordings: 15 Years (re-release of Reverb on the Click, with Foreign Objects and CKY: Disengage the Simulator EP)
- 2011: Philmont Ave. Demo Collection 1993–1995 (30-track collection consisting of demos along with recorded tracks not included with Reverb on the Click)
