= Afterworld (song) =

Single by CKY

from the album Jackass 3D: Music from the Motion Picture and B-Sides & Rarities
- Released: September 30, 2010
- Genre: Alternative metal; stoner rock
- Length: 4:38
- Label: Distant; Mighty Loud
- Songwriters: Chad I Ginsburg; Deron Miller
- Producer: Chad I Ginsburg

CKY singles chronology
"A#1 Roller Rager" (2009)	"Afterworld" (2010)	"3D" (2011)

"Afterworld" is a song by American rock band CKY. Written by Chad I Ginsburg and Deron Miller, it was originally featured on the soundtrack to the 2010 film Jackass 3D, and was later included on the band's 2011 compilation album B-Sides & Rarities. The song is the band's first to feature Ginsburg on lead vocals, and it was released as a single on September 30, 2010.

== Origins and recording ==
CKY first began working on "Afterworld" during recording sessions for the band's 2009 fourth studio album Carver City. The band's frontman Deron Miller originally wrote the music for the song and recorded the basic guitar riffs, although it was later shelved and not completed in time to be considered for inclusion on the album. During a later session in which the band was tasked with recording a song for inclusion on Jackass 3D, guitarist Chad I Ginsburg wrote the lyrics (after watching an early screening of the film) and recorded the vocals and remaining instrumental parts for "Afterworld" while Miller was out of the studio buying food for the group.

== Composition and style ==
Speaking about the themes of the song in a behind-the-scenes interview, Ginsburg explained that the majority of the lyrics were written in relation to "being a stuntman", in line with the content of the Jackass TV series and films. Miller added to this explanation by noting that Ginsburg and the band based the song on Jackass 3D and "tried to make it about just going for it – in stunts and stuff like that". Ginsburg also revealed that the line "We'll never die in the afterworld" in the chorus was originally intended to be "We'll never die in the 3D world", although it was eventually changed due to the association with Jackass 3D being "overkill" according to Bam Margera.

== Release and reception ==
"Afterworld" was first released as a digital download single on iTunes and Amazon.com on September 30, 2010, alongside an acoustic recording of Carver City closing track "Era of an End". After being featured in the film's closing credits, the track was later included on the Jackass 3D soundtrack on October 25. The following March, it was included as the opening track on the compilation album B-Sides & Rarities.

Critical reception to "Afterworld" was mixed. Rick Florino of Artistdirect claimed that the song "elevates [CKY's] patented progressively pummeling hard rock into new sonic territory" and features "a combination of polyrhythmic riffing, searing lead lines and impassioned, infectious vocal delivery", while AllMusic's Jason Lymangrover criticized its inclusion on the Jackass 3D soundtrack.

== Music video ==
The music video for "Afterworld" was directed by Bam Margera and released in July 2011 after the release of both the Jackass 3D soundtrack and B-Sides & Rarities. Filming for the video took place on November 15 and 16, 2010 at Philadelphia Soundstages in Philadelphia, Pennsylvania. In a 2015 interview, Deron Miller explained that he did not agree with the idea of producing a video for the single, describing it as a "bad idea" and noting that both he and drummer Jess Margera turned down appearing in the video. Speaking about the video itself, he revealed that he had only seen it once and condemned it as "cheesy and desperate".

The video was dedicated to the memory of CKY crew member and Jackass star Ryan Dunn, who died in a car crash on June 20, 2011. Speaking about the video at the time of its release, Jess Margera explained that the band chose to dedicate it to Dunn as the song features lyrics which were written about "not saying goodbye", and revealed that in Dunn's final text message to Ginsburg he praised "Afterworld" as his favourite CKY music video.

== Personnel ==
- Chad I Ginsburg – vocals, guitar, production
- Deron Miller – guitar
- Jess Margera – drums
- Matt "Matty J" Janaitis – bass, keyboards
