= A♯1 Roller Rager =

"A#1 Roller Rager"

Single by CKY

from the album Carver City
- Released: May 4, 2009
- Genre: Heavy metal; alternative metal
- Length: 3:50
- Label: Roadrunner
- Songwriter(s): Deron Miller; Chad I Ginsburg
- Producer(s): Chad I Ginsburg

CKY singles chronology
"Hellions on Parade" (2009)	"A#1 Roller Rager" (2009)	"Afterworld" (2010)

"A#1 Roller Rager" is a song by American rock band CKY. Written by Deron Miller and Chad I Ginsburg, it was featured on the band's 2009 fourth studio album, Carver City. It was released as the second and final single from Carver City on May 4, 2009.

== Composition and style ==
In a review of Carver City, guitar website Ultimate Guitar Archive noted that "A#1 Roller Rager vacillates between broody and raging". PopMatters writer Lana Cooper described the song as "wickedly melodic", and claimed that it sounded "vaguely reminiscent" of alternative rock band Foo Fighters. Phil Freeman of music website AllMusic compared the style of the track's guitar riff to the band Fu Manchu.

== Promotion and release ==
"A#1 Roller Rager" was released as a digital download single on May 4, 2009, the second single from the album following "Hellions on Parade". In 2015, it was included on the reissue of the compilation album The Best of CKY.

== Music video ==
The music video for "A#1 Roller Rager" was directed by drummer Jess Margera's brother Bam Margera and produced by Joe Frantz, with post-production effects added by Backseat Conceptions. The video was released in May 2009, shortly after the single and the album.

== Critical reception ==
AllMusic writer Phil Freeman identified "A#1 Roller Rager" as one of three highlights on Carver City, praising the track for its guitar riff, presence of synthesizers, and chorus.
