= Carver City =

Studio album by CKY
- Released: May 19, 2009
- Recorded: January 2007 – December 2008
- Studio: Studio CIG Pennsylvania (New Hope, Pennsylvania); Studio 4 (Conshohocken, Pennsylvania); 4th Street Recording (Santa Monica, California)
- Genre: Alternative metal; alternative rock; stoner rock
- Length: 41:58
- Label: Roadrunner
- Producer: Chad I Ginsburg; Deron Miller

CKY chronology
An Answer Can Be Found (2005)	Carver City (2009)	The Phoenix (2017)

Singles from Carver City
- 1. "Hellions on Parade" Released: April 20, 2009; 2. "A#1 Roller Rager" Released: May 4, 2009; 3. "...And She Never Returned" Released: 2009

Carver City is the fourth studio album by American alternative metal band CKY. Recorded mainly at guitarist and producer Chad I Ginsburg's Studio CIG Pennsylvania in New Hope, Pennsylvania, it was released on May 19, 2009, by Roadrunner Records. The album reached number 46 on the US Billboard 200, number four on the Hard Rock Albums chart, and number 14 on the Rock Albums chart.

Written by vocalist and guitarist Deron Miller, Carver City is often billed as a concept album about the fictional eponymous town, which is said to be a holiday resort plagued by crime. This has been compared to the band's own fictional storyline of "Hellview". It is the first CKY album to feature bassist Matt Deis, who joined the band shortly after the release of 2005's An Answer Can Be Found, and the last to feature vocalist and guitarist Deron Miller, who left the band in 2011.

The writing and recording of the album took over two years to complete, with internal tensions between band members slowing progress at various points in the process. Carver City was a success both commercially and critically, with reviewers praising the high production values and experimental nature of the songs on the album. "Hellions on Parade" and "A#1 Roller Rager" were released as singles.

== Recording and production ==
Most of the recording for Carver City took place at guitarist and producer Chad I Ginsburg's Studio CIG Pennsylvania in New Hope, Pennsylvania, with additional parts recorded at Studio 4 in Conshohocken, Pennsylvania and 4th Street Recording in Santa Monica, California. The album was mixed at Studio 4 and Studio CIG by Ginsburg and Phil Nicolo, and mastered at Masterdisk in New York City by Howie Weinberg. According to the album's liner notes, recording started in January 2007 and was completed by December 2008.

The production of Carver City was plagued by a number of problems, including disagreements between band members. In October 2007, Ginsburg claimed that Miller had left the band after it was reported that a "physical altercation" had broken about. Miller explained that he had confronted Ginsburg and Margera after he heard them say some "extremely personal, painful things" about him, and that he was considering returning to the group after dealing with his increasing problems with alcohol abuse. After almost a year of inactivity, it was reported in October 2008 that CKY was back together, with Miller claiming that the band was "98% done tracking" Carver City.

Miller reflected on the production process of the album prior to its release, stating that "Sobriety, hard work, patching up inner turmoil and a love for what we do has undoubtedly made this the most collaborative and focused CKY effort to date". He attributed many of the problems to "alcohol and shit talking" and explained that much of the album was recorded by individual band members in isolation, with the group sharing recordings by email.

"Hellions on Parade" was originally titled "Hellview III: Hellions on Parade", "Karmaworks" was originally known as "Karma Works Its Way", "Stripped Your Speech" was originally named "Underappreciated", and other track titles included "Making Contact" and "There's Two of Me". "Plagued by Images" is a reworked version of the song "Dropped", which was recorded back when CKY was still called oiL. In a 2015 interview, Miller claimed that he and Ginsburg began working on an early version of "Afterworld" during sessions for Carver City, but didn't complete the track in time. Additionally, he claimed that bassist Matt Deis wrote at least one song for the album, but that Ginsburg opposed its inclusion as he had not contributed a song as well.

== Promotion and release ==
The title and release date of Carver City were confirmed in January 2009, with Ginsburg describing the album as "more inventive and more layered than our past releases, with the most melodies, textures and riffs of any CKY album ... by far the most inspired album we have ever made". The album cover artwork, designed by Travis Smith, was revealed in March. The first song released from the album was lead single "Hellions on Parade", which the band made available for free download in April 2009, before its release later in the month. The full album was streamed exclusively on the website Noisecreep ahead of its release. "A#1 Roller Rager" was released as the second single from the album on May 4.

In promotion of the album CKY toured extensively, beginning with a North American headline tour in June 2009. The group was supported by ASG and Graveyard on the tour, which ran until August and ended with a "hometown show" in Philadelphia. The band continued touring throughout the rest of the year, visiting a number of countries in Europe in November, and later played their first two shows in Japan as part of the Taste of Chaos tour alongside In Flames and Atreyu.

Carver City is the band's first and only album to be released by Roadrunner Records, with whom they signed in December 2006.

== Composition ==
=== Lyrics ===
The lyrics of the songs on Carver City are largely focused around the story of a fictional town of the same name. Speaking at the time of the album's announcement, primary songwriter Miller offered the following description of the concept: "The fabled town of Carver City has a history of bad luck and misfortune, all the while giving the impression that it's a pleasant family getaway. Much like CKY's town of Hellview, Carver City's events are depicted in the songs, with story lines coming from real-life events." Adding more detail to the concept, it was noted in an interview with the website Noisecreep that the city is named after a fisherman who killed his crew and later returns to "curse the city", leaving residents trapped; Miller has revealed that this is intended to be "pretty symbolic of where we are today with the economy".

The album opens with "Hellions on Parade", which is the third entry in the band's own "Hellview" storyline, which started with Volume 1's "96 Quite Bitter Beings" and Infiltrate•Destroy•Rebuild's "Escape from Hellview". Miller describes Hellview as "a town that doesn't take kindly to outsiders", explaining that "[Hellions on Parade] is about Hellview destroying its rival city".

One of the focal tracks of the Carver City story is said to be "The Boardwalk Body", which was written by Miller based on a true story wherein a dead body was discovered during one of his family holidays in Wildwood, New Jersey. Speaking about the story, the vocalist and guitarist noted that it happened when he was "11 or 12" years old and described it as "a really bizarre period of learning for me". Lana Cooper of the website PopMatters has proposed that the song is a sequel to an earlier track on the album, "...And She Never Returned", in which a young woman goes missing and is never found, presumed to be murdered.

=== Music ===
Musically, Carver City has been noted for its experimental nature and difference from the band's previous releases. In his review of the album, AllMusic's Phil Freeman noted the prominence of synthesizers on many of the songs, which with other elements he claimed made the band sound "bizarre ... weird ... [and] unique". Similarly, Cooper of PopMatters claimed that "Carver City finds CKY miles away from the sophomoric sounds of their demos ... as well as that of their last disc, 2005's An Answer Can Be Found. She also highlighted the use of synthesizers on the album, describing that they "add to the eerie atmosphere and sound almost like a second guitar".

Other critics, however, compared Carver City to preceding CKY albums. Blabbermouth.net's review claimed that "this is classic CKY, to the point that most of these songs would fit seamlessly on the band's previous albums", highlighting "Plagued by Images" and "Karmaworks" in particular as reminiscent of the band's older material.

== Reception ==
=== Commercial ===
Carver City was the third album released by CKY to register on a music chart, reaching number 46 on the US Billboard 200. The album was also the band's first to chart on the Billboard Hard Rock Albums chart, on which it reached number four, and the Billboard Rock Albums chart, on which it reached number 14. According to Nielsen SoundScan, the album sold approximately 11,000 copies in the United States in its first week of release. According to Miller, as of August 2015 the album has sold over 37,000 copies, making it the lowest-selling CKY studio album.

=== Critical ===
Professional ratings
Review scores
Source	Rating
AllMusic	4/5 stars
Blabbermouth.net	7/10
Laut.de	3/5 stars
PopMatters	7/10 stars
Powermetal.de	8.5/10
Rock Sound	7/10
Ultimate Guitar Archive	8/10

Media response to Carver City was generally positive. Freeman of AllMusic applauded the band for being "smart and unique" on the album, praising elements such as the use of synthesizers and "seriously heavy" guitar riffs, especially on the tracks "Rats in the Infirmary", "Woe Is Me" and "A#1 Roller Rager". Cooper of PopMatters praised the release in comparison to its predecessor, An Answer Can Be Found, by claiming that it "strikes the right mix of theme and variety while offering a much more polished version of the sound that brought them to the dance". She went on to describe the style of the album as akin to "grandiose ‘80s thrash- and power-metal with a modern sensibility", praising the contribution of bassist Matt Deis. Amy Sciarretto of Ultimate Guitar Archive praised the genre-defying and "twist[ing] and turn[ing]" nature of the songs.

Some reviewers did, however, criticise the lack of variety on the album. Blabbermouth.net's review criticised Carver City for featuring many songs which are similar to those released on previous albums, concluding that it has "just a couple too many uninspired songs". Similarly, Rock Sound noted that the album's style was "a familiar realm", but continued by describing it as "better focused, clearer sounding rock".

== Track listing ==
All tracks are written by Deron Miller, except where noted.

No.	Title	Length
1.	"Hellions on Parade" (written by Miller, Chad I Ginsburg and Jess Margera)	3:40
2.	"...And She Never Returned"	3:31
3.	"Rats in the Infirmary"	3:30
4.	"Imaginary Threats"	3:43
5.	"The Boardwalk Body"	3:39
6.	"Plagued by Images"	3:24
7.	"Karmaworks"	4:05
8.	"Woe Is Me"	3:47
9.	"A#1 Roller Rager"	3:50
10.	"Old Carver's Bones"	4:57
11.	"The Era of an End"	3:52
Total length:		41:58

Special edition bonus tracks
No.	Title	Length
12.	"Fisherman's Wharf, Pt. 1"	4:15
13.	"Fisherman's Wharf, Pt. 2"	2:56
14.	"Doubled Up on Trauma"	3:27
15.	"Stripped Your Speech"	3:55
Total length:		56:31

Japanese edition bonus track
No.	Title	Length
12.	"Doubled Up on Trauma"	3:27
Total length:		45:25

== Personnel ==
=== CKY ===
- Deron Miller – lead vocals, guitar, bass guitar, Moog synthesizers, additional production, orchestration, concept
- Chad I Ginsburg – guitar, bass, Moog synthesizers, backing vocals, production, engineering, mixing, orchestration, concept
- Jess Margera – drums
- Matt Deis – bass guitar

=== Additional musicians ===
- Rob Murry Valeno – additional percussion

=== Production ===
- Phil Nicolo – additional engineering, mixing
- Chris Mullings – additional engineering
- Frank Moore – additional engineering
- Matthew Janaitis – engineering assistance
- Matthew Agoglia – sequencing
- Howie Weinberg – mastering

=== Artwork ===
- Travis Smith – artwork
- Travis Shinn – photography

== Charts ==
Chart performance for Carver City
Chart (2009)	Peak position
Australian Albums (ARIA)	98
UK Rock & Metal Albums (OCC)	7
US Billboard 200	46
US Top Hard Rock Albums (Billboard)	4
