= Flesh into Gear =

Single by CKY

from the album Infiltrate•Destroy•Rebuild and Jackass: The Music, Vol. 1
- Released: 2002
- Genre: Alternative rock, alternative metal
- Length: 3:06
- Label: Island
- Songwriter(s): Deron Miller; Chad I Ginsburg; Jess Margera
- Producer(s): Chad I Ginsburg

CKY singles chronology
"96 Quite Bitter Beings" (1999)	"Flesh into Gear" (2002)	"Familiar Realm" (2005)

"Flesh into Gear" is a song by American rock band CKY. Written by band members Deron Miller, Chad I Ginsburg and Jess Margera, and produced by Ginsburg, it is featured on the band's 2002 second studio album Infiltrate•Destroy•Rebuild. The song was released as a single in 2002, reaching number 38 on the US Billboard Mainstream Rock chart.

== Origins and recording ==
As with the rest of the Infiltrate•Destroy•Rebuild album, writing for "Flesh into Gear" was credited to vocalist and guitarist Deron Miller, guitarist Chad I Ginsburg and drummer Jess Margera. Prior to its release in 2002, the song was recorded as a demo under the title "Sinking Fast" and featured on the second CKY video, CKY2K, released in 2000.

== Composition and style ==
Billboard magazine described the overall atmosphere of "Flesh into Gear" as "anthemic". However, a review of Infiltrate•Destroy•Rebuild on Sputnikmusic labelled the song as "negative", noting an "upbeat-yet-stoneresque rhythm" at the beginning of the track. Spin magazine related the song to the band's link with skateboarding and stunt videos, describing it as "elbow-scraping rock".

PopMatters writer Nikki Tranter proposed that the lyrics of the song saw singer Miller "relating his band's vision for its future", citing lines such as "A simple sound/A heavy side/Could win the whole world over".

== Release and reception ==
In addition to its original release on the album Infiltrate•Destroy•Rebuild in September 2002, "Flesh into Gear" was also featured on the film Jackass: The Movie in October that year, and included on its soundtrack album. It was released as a single to promote both albums that year, and became the first single release by the band to chart when it reached number 38 on the US Billboard Mainstream Rock chart. In 2015, it was included on the compilation album The Best of CKY.

The track has generally been praised by music critics and fans since its original release. Billboard magazine said that it contained "enough unique elements to raise [the band] above the competition", while Tranter of PopMatters described it in the same category as "Escape from Hellview" and "Frenetic Amnesic" as a "neat heavy rock tune".

Music website Loudwire ranked "Flesh into Gear" as the 35th-best hard rock song of the 21st century, with writer Graham Hartmann claiming that it "barely scratches the surface in regard to the band's accomplishments in both importance and creativity".

== Music video ==
The music video for "Flesh into Gear" was directed by Bam Margera, brother of drummer Jess, and released in the week of December 23, 2002. The video was later released, alongside videos for the other nine songs on the album, on the band's 2003 video album Infiltrate•Destroy•Rebuild: The Video Album. Writing a review of the album for the website The Movies Made Me Do It, Chad Connolly quoted director Margera as noting that the video was filmed on an "extremely low budget", and described it as a performance video interlaced with stunt clips featuring CKY crew members Brandon DiCamillo, Rake Yohn, and Margera.
