= Familiar Realm =

Single by CKY

from the album An Answer Can Be Found
- Released: May 25, 2005
- Genre: Alternative metal
- Length: 3:57
- Label: Island/Def Jam
- Songwriters: Deron Miller, Chad I Ginsburg
- Producer: Chad I Ginsburg

CKY singles chronology
"Attached at the Hip" (2002)	"Familiar Realm" (2005)	"Hellions on Parade" (2009)

"Familiar Realm" is a song by American rock band CKY, featured on their 2005 third studio album An Answer Can Be Found. Written by vocalist and guitarist Deron Miller and guitarist Chad I Ginsburg, who also produced the album, the song was released as the only single from the album on May 25, 2005.

== Background ==
Deron Miller, while recognising that it was "the song that sold the record", suggests that "Familiar Realm" was "the wrong choice" for the lead single from An Answer..., instead favouring "The Way You Lived" and, as a second single, "Don't Hold Your Breath". Drummer Jess Margera has revealed that the song is his least favourite to perform live, suggesting that "it just doesn't come across live anywhere near as smoothly as the record."

== Music video ==
The music video for "Familiar Realm", the only to be produced for a track from An Answer Can Be Found, was directed by Matt Lenski, the band's first not involving Bam Margera. The video has many of the bands gruesome themes including references to assault, suicide, and murder.

== Track listing ==
All tracks are written by Deron Miller and Chad I Ginsburg.

Digital download
No.	Title	Length
1.	"Familiar Realm"	3:57
Total length:		3:57

Promo CD single (ISLR16323-2)
No.	Title	Length
1.	"Familiar Realm" (radio edit)	3:44
2.	"Familiar Realm" (album version)	3:57
Total length:		7:41
