= Matt Lenski =

American director of television commercials, music videos, and films

- Born: New York City
- Awards: MTV Video Music Award

Matt Lenski is an American director of television commercials, music videos, and films. He is based in New York City. Lenski won an MTV Video Music Award for his direction of Fall Out Boy's "Sugar, We're Goin' Down" video. His short film Meaning Of Robots was officially accepted in the 2012 Sundance Film Festival.

Lenski's 2004 viral campaign, "F*ck New York," parodied the Republican Presidential Convention, which took place in New York City. The satire featured thug teens playing the roles of President George W. Bush and his political bedfellows. New York Magazine quoted it as Russell Simmons' preferred viral video.

== Music videos ==
- Fall Out Boy "Sugar, We're Goin' Down" (hi-fi version) (2005)
- Rogue Wave "Publish My Love" (2006)
- The Giraffes "Having Fun" (2006)
- CKY "Familiar Realm" (2006)
- Band of Horses "The Funeral" (2006) (using footage directed by his father, Willy Lenski)
- Zero 7 feat. Sia "Throw It All Away" (2006)
- Regina Spektor "On the Radio" (version 1) (2006)
- Mark Ronson feat. Daniel Merriweather "Stop Me" (US / international version) (2007)
- Orson "Ain't No Party" (2007)
- Get Busy Committee "I Don't Care About You" (2010)
- Hal Linton "Mind Control" (2010)

== Short films ==
- Filibuster premiered at the Rooftop Film Festival.
- Meaning of Robots premiered at the Sundance Film Festival
- F*ck New York
