= An Answer Can Be Found =

Studio album by CKY
- Released: June 28, 2005
- Recorded: 2004–2005
- Studio: 4th Street Recording (Santa Monica, California); Paramount Recording (Hollywood, California); Sony Music Studios (New York City)
- Genre: Alternative metal; alternative rock; stoner rock
- Length: 38:51
- Label: Island
- Producer: Chad I Ginsburg

CKY chronology
Infiltrate•Destroy•Rebuild (2002)	An Answer Can Be Found (2005)	Carver City (2009)

Singles from An Answer Can Be Found
- 1. "Familiar Realm" Released: May 24, 2005

An Answer Can Be Found (stylized as an Ånswer can be found) is the third studio album by American rock band CKY. Recorded at studios in California and New York City, it was produced by guitarist Chad I Ginsburg and released on June 28, 2005, by Island Records in North America and Mercury Records in Europe. The album reached number 35 on the US Billboard 200, the highest position achieved by the band to date.

Originally named The Butcher's Hand, An Answer Can Be Found was written by vocalist and guitarist Deron Miller with assistance from Ginsburg, and featured a number of songs from early in the band's career. Again, the album featured the core lineup of Miller, Ginsburg and drummer Jess Margera, with Miller and Ginsburg playing bass on the record in addition to guitars and vocals.

At the time of its release, An Answer Can Be Found was presented by CKY's members as the band's magnum opus; however, the album received mixed reviews from music critics, who offered contrasting views on whether the band's music had evolved or not. "Familiar Realm" was released as a single on May 24, 2005, reaching number 32 on the Billboard Mainstream Rock chart.

== Recording and production ==
Recording for An Answer Can Be Found took place at 4th Street Recording in Santa Monica, California, Paramount Recording in Hollywood, California, and Sony Music Studios in New York City; sequencing, editing and mastering took place at Masterdisk in New York City. Recording began on April 7, 2004. Production and mixing were handled by guitarist Chad I Ginsburg, with Pablo Arraya assisting with engineering, Roger Lian working on sequencing and editing with Ginsburg, and Howie Weinberg mastering the album.

As was the case with the band's previous releases, many of the album's songs were written and recorded in the form of demos years before its release. "Behind the Screams" was originally recorded for a bonus feature in the 2003 film Haggard: The Movie, directed by Bam Margera, and was re-recorded for An Answer Can Be Found as a response to fan requests. "Don't Hold Your Breath" originates from the Volume 1 era of the band, but "never really fit anywhere until [An Answer Can Be Found] was made". The title of "Behind the Screams" is a play on words, referring to both the presence of the song on a behind-the-scenes feature on the Haggard DVD release and the fact that the song comes after "Tripled Manic State", which ends with a scream.

After songwriting on Volume 1 was credited solely to vocalist Deron Miller, and songwriting on Infiltrate•Destroy•Rebuild was credited to Miller, Ginsburg and drummer Jess Margera, An Answer Can Be Found credited Miller and Ginsburg for writing. The album is the first to feature a guest musician, in the form of Jena Kraus who performed additional vocals on "The Way You Lived".

An Answer Can Be Found is the first CKY album that does not have any keyboards or synthesizers. Instead, it is the first to include guitar solos, and is the only album (up to its release) to have no additional songs recorded for it. Two songs were previously written and finished for this album, "Behind the Screams" and "Deceit Is Striking Gold". The band recorded a cover of the Kiss song "I Stole Your Love", but that tape was lost during recording of the album. In 2010, when the band was putting together B-Sides & Rarities, the tape was unearthed. "Dressed in Decay" originally had a piano intro for the album version, which was later removed. Some of the early song titles include: "Mezmorized" (The Way You Lived), "The Butcher's Hand" (As the Tables Turn), and "Just Quit" (Deceit Is Striking Gold).

== Promotion and release ==
Upon completion of the album, Miller assured fans that the band had created "the best rock record of 2005", praising both Ginsburg and Margera for their contributions to the release. "Familiar Realm" was the only single released from the album, reaching number 32 on the Billboard Mainstream Rock chart, although "Tripled Manic State" was included on a free split release with The Bronx, released by Fat City magazine in May 2006. "As the Tables Turn" was featured on the 2005 video game Burnout Revenge.

In promotion of the album, CKY joined the 2005 Rock Adio Tour, sponsored by skateboarding company Adio Footwear, alongside Fireball Ministry and The Knives. The tour ran throughout North America between August and September 2005, and included a headline performance at the festival Skate Fest in Worcester, Massachusetts. Following the tour, the band toured in the UK with Clutch, and later supported Avenged Sevenfold on the Cities of Evil Tour between January and February 2006. The group also performed on NBC show Last Call with Carson Daly on November 11, 2005, performing the songs "Suddenly Tragic" and "Tripled Manic State".

An Answer Can Be Found was the last CKY album to be released by Island Records, as the band left the label in 2006.

Miller claimed in October 2015 that a new lineup of CKY (dubbed "Mecha CKY") would be re-recording and re-releasing the album.

== Title and packaging ==
CKY's third studio album was originally planned to be titled The Butcher's Hand, which is a lyric from the song "As the Tables Turn"; this was later changed to the final title, An Answer Can Be Found, which is a lyric from the album's opening track, "Suddenly Tragic".

The artwork for the album cover, produced by t42design, features the letter "A" in the background as a tribute to the band's fanbase, which is affectionately dubbed the "Alliance" and was described on the band's website as "ultra loyal".

== Composition ==
=== Lyrics ===
Many of the lyrics on An Answer Can Be Found include references to suicide, in particular renouncing the idea, with the songs "Suddenly Tragic", "The Way You Lived" and "Don't Hold Your Breath" all said to relate to this theme. Gigwise described the album's lyrics as "angry yet positive". The lyrics of "Tripled Manic State" are about the idea of experimenting on humans, and the song is a sequel to Infiltrate•Destroy•Rebuild track "Inhuman Creation Station", which was written about a hypothetical factory which manufactured humans. "Familiar Realm" is said to be about feelings of "frustration and ennui", with Billboard magazine proposing these themes being felt by band members in relation to CKY's "growing fame".

=== Music ===
The music of An Answer Can Be Found has been compared to that of previous album Infiltrate•Destroy•Rebuild, but has also been identified as an evolution from the 2002 release. AllMusic's Rob Theakston noted that the album followed much of the same formula as the band's previous album, but claimed that it is "more heavy metal than it is punk", identifying the influence of GG Allin on the record. Alternative Press writer Rob Ortenzi highlighted the "slowed-down death-metal riffs and midtempo backbeat that've become CKY's trademarks". A review on Blabbermouth.net summarized the album's style as being typified by "massive riffs, a full-bodied production style, and an interesting combination of stoner esthetics with futuristic leanings", while Gigwise described it as sounding like "a cross between Weezer and Stone Temple Pilots with the song sensibilities of Linkin Park".

== Reception ==
=== Commercial ===
An Answer Can Be Found was the second album released by CKY to register on a music chart, reaching number 35 on the US Billboard 200 (the band's highest position to date). According to Nielsen SoundScan, the album sold 27,786 copies in the United States in its first week of release. According to Deron Miller, as of August 2015 the album has sold over 153,000 copies, making it the third-best-selling CKY album behind Infiltrate•Destroy•Rebuild and Volume 1.

=== Critical ===
Professional ratings
Review scores
Source	Rating
AllMusic	4/5 stars
Alternative Press	5/5
Blabbermouth.net	7/10
Exclaim!	Unfavorable
Gaffa	2/6
Gigwise	4.5/5 stars
IGN	8.5/10
Rolling Stone	1/5 stars

Media response to An Answer Can Be Found was mixed. Ortenzi of Alternative Press awarded the album a rating of five out of five, claiming that "every riff feels precision cut; every melody holds a surprise; every drumbeat knocks the ball into the pocket; and the synth and classical-guitar accents ... serve the songs perfectly". AllMusic's Theakston was similarly positive in his four-star review, identifying an evolution in the band's sound from previous albums and praising the "tight" interplay between Miller and Ginsburg. Blabbermouth.net's review praised An Answer Can Be Found for its progression from Infiltrate•Destroy•Rebuild, guitar riffs, production style and melodic elements. Gigwise applauded the album too, describing it as a "wonderful album that must be purchased by all immediately", and highlighting "Suddenly Tragic" and "Tripled Manic State".

However, writing for the magazine Exclaim!, Kendall Shields criticised An Answer Can Be Found for its lack of progression from Infiltrate•Destroy•Rebuild, claiming that the band "barely manage to reiterate, let alone reinvent the suburban skate punk wheel" on the album. She recognised the attempt at variety on the closing track "Don't Hold Your Breath", but concluded that the track does not appeal to many outside of the band's core fanbase. The album's review on Blabbermouth.net complained that An Answer Can Be Found lacks "one absolutely killer tune", and also criticsed Miller's vocal performances, which were described as "limited in range and ... a bit over-produced". PopMatters writer Lana Cooper claimed that An Answer Can Be Found is "knee-deep in dull songs indistinguishable from one another".

The album received an infamously negative review from Rolling Stone writer Jenny Eliscu, who awarded it one star out of five and described it as "mind-numbing stoner metal, with ginormous power chords, repetitive vocals and overwrought lyrics". She even went as far as suggesting a listener might want to commit suicide just to "drown out the sound" of the album. Miller publicly responded to the review, criticising Rolling Stone for publishing Eliscu's opinion and suggesting that the critic "simply isn't intelligent enough to understand" the lyrics she criticized.

The feud with Rolling Stone later escalated, after Miller allegedly posted Eliscu's home telephone number online and CKY fans subsequently harassed and even threatened the journalist. Eliscu complained to the band's label The Island Def Jam Music Group and publicist, while Rolling Stone defended the writer by retorting that the episode seemed like "a rather sad attempt to promote a band who should ... rely more on their talent".

== Track listing ==
All tracks are written by Deron Miller with Chad I Ginsburg.

No.	Title	Length
1.	"Suddenly Tragic"	4:54
2.	"The Way You Lived"	3:50
3.	"Dressed in Decay"	3:15
4.	"Familiar Realm"	3:55
5.	"All Power to Slaves"	3:28
6.	"Tripled Manic State"	3:23
7.	"Behind the Screams"	1:34
8.	"Deceit Is Striking Gold"	2:59
9.	"As the Tables Turn"	4:08
10.	"Sniped"	3:17
11.	"Don't Hold Your Breath"	4:02
Total length:		38:51

- The enhanced CD version of the album also features a video interview.

== Personnel ==
=== CKY ===
- Deron Miller – lead vocals, guitar, bass
- Chad I Ginsburg – lead guitar, vocals, bass, production, mixing, sequencing, editing
- Jess Margera – drums

=== Additional musicians ===
- Jena Kraus – backing vocals on ("The Way You Lived")

=== Production ===
- Pablo Arraya – additional engineering, mix engineering
- Jason Agel – engineering assistance
- Steve Tolle – engineering assistance
- Roger Lian – sequencing, digital editing
- Howie Weinberg – mastering

=== Artwork ===
- t42design – art direction, design
- Adam Wallacavage – photography
- Ringo Suicide – photography (CD tray)
- Brandon DiCamillo – Video editing (interview)
