= Disengage the Simulator =

EP by CKY
- Released: August 22, 2000
- Genre: Alternative metal; alternative rock; stoner rock; experimental rock
- Length: 24:05
- Label: Volcom
- Producer: Chad I Ginsburg; Deron Miller; John Teague

CKY chronology
| Volume 2 (1999) | Disengage the Simulator (2000) | Infiltrate•Destroy•Rebuild (2002) |

Disengage the Simulator is an extended play (EP) by American rock band CKY. Produced by Chad I Ginsburg, Deron Miller and John Teague, it was released on August 22, 2000, by Volcom Entertainment. The EP features a number of songs previously released on the band's 1999 album Volume 2, in addition to the title track of the release, which was originally featured on Volume 1.

== Background ==
Disengage the Simulator was released during the 2000 Warped Tour, on which the band was performing at the time, and was initially limited to 2,000 copies. Following the conclusion of the tour, it was later sold through Volcom Entertainment's mail order program. The album cover features a still of Angela Baker (portrayed by Felissa Rose) from the film Sleepaway Camp; Miller would later marry Rose, and the band would make cameo appearances in the 2008 sequel Return to Sleepaway Camp.

== Track listing ==
Original 2000 edition
| No. | Title | Length |
|---|---|---|
| 1. | "Disengage the Simulator" | 3:08 |
| 2. | "Genesis 12a" (instrumental) | 3:04 |
| 3. | "Santa's Coming" | 3:40 |
| 4. | "Shippensburg" | 3:19 |
| 5. | "Rio Bravo" (remix) | 2:24 |
| 6. | "Foreign Objects #10" | 4:12 |
| 7. | "Disengage the Simulator" (instrumental demo) | 4:22 |
| Total length: | | 24:05 |

2009 digital download
| No. | Title | Length |
|---|---|---|
| 1. | "Disengage the Simulator" | 3:14 |
| 2. | "Shippensburg" | 3:23 |
| 3. | "Santa's Coming" | 3:43 |
| 4. | "Disengage the Simulator" (Foreign Objects version) | 3:19 |
| Total length: | | 14:13 |

Distant Recordings box set version
| No. | Title | Length |
|---|---|---|
| 1. | "Disengage the Simulator" | 3:03 |
| 2. | "Rio Bravo" (Remix) | 2:23 |
| 3. | "Shippensburg" | 3:22 |
| 4. | "Genesis 12A" (Instrumental) | 3:03 |
| 5. | "Santa's Coming" | 3:43 |
| 6. | "Fat Fuck" | 2:12 |
| 7. | "To All of You" (Static Mix) | 4:50 |
| Total length: | | 22:36 |

== Personnel ==
- Deron Miller – guitar, bass, vocals, production (tracks 6 and 7)
- Chad I Ginsburg – guitar, production (tracks 1–5)
- Jess Margera – drums
- Bam Margera – vocals (track 3)
- John Teague – production (tracks 6 and 7)
