= CKY (band) =

American rock band

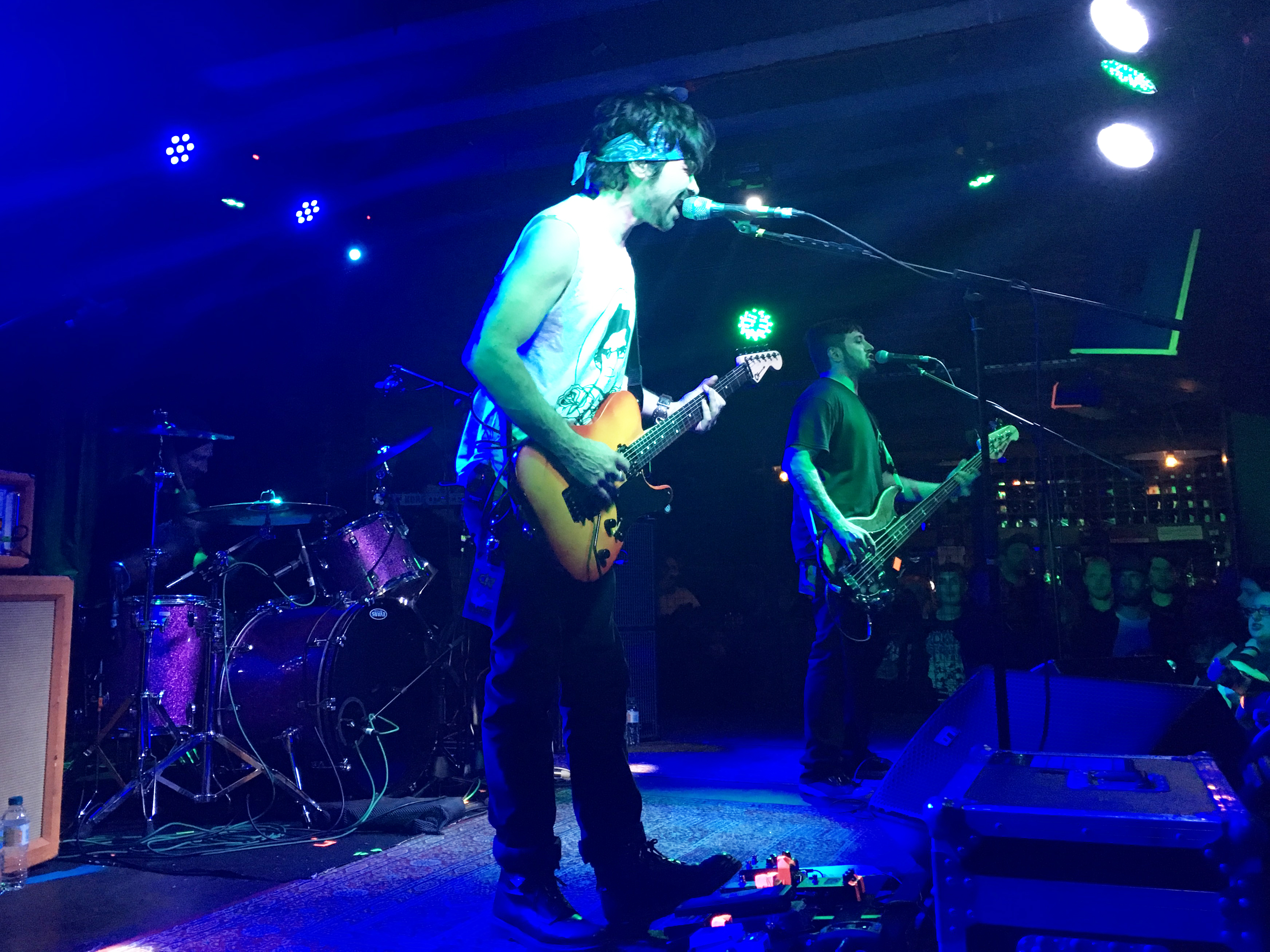
- CKY in 2017. Left to right: Jess Margera, Chad Ginsburg, and Matt Deis

Background information
- Also known as: Camp Kill Yourself; Camp
- Origin: West Chester, Pennsylvania, U.S.
- Genres: Alternative metal; stoner rock; alternative rock
- Works: CKY discography
- Years active: 1998–present
- Labels: Entertainment One; Long Branch; Distant; Mighty Loud; Roadrunner; Island; Volcom; Teil Martin
- Spinoffs: World Under Blood; The Company Band; 96 Bitter Beings; Gnarkill
- Spinoff of: Foreign Objects
- Members: Jess Margera; Chad I Ginsburg
- Past members: Deron Miller; Matt Deis; Matt "Matty J" Janaitis; Daniel Davies; Mike Leon
- Website: ckyofficial.com

CKY (abbreviation of Camp Kill Yourself) is an American rock band from West Chester, Pennsylvania. Formed in early 1998, the group was originally centred around the trio of Deron Miller on guitar and lead vocals, Chad I Ginsburg on lead guitar and Jess Margera on drums.

The band debuted in 1999 with Volume 1, gaining underground recognition from its association with the CKY video series produced by Margera's brother, skateboarder Bam Margera, and a collective who colloquially became known as the CKY crew. After signing with The Island Def Jam Music Group, CKY released its second album Infiltrate•Destroy•Rebuild in 2002, which reached the top half of the US Billboard 200 chart. The 2005 follow-up An Answer Can Be Found reached the US top 40, after which the band (with bassist Matt Deis) released Carver City on Roadrunner Records. In late-2011, following many years of tensions between himself and the other members, Miller left CKY.

Following Miller's departure, CKY spent several years making only sporadic live appearances. The band played shows with stand-in frontman Daniel Davies during 2012 and 2015, before Ginsburg took over lead vocal duties for the group's studio return, 2017's The Phoenix. Deis, who had returned to the band in 2015, left CKY for a second time in 2019, after which Ginsburg and Margera performed with a string of touring bassists, and briefly as a two-piece. Since 2022, the group has been working on a sixth studio album, as well as touring with bassist Ronnie Elvis James, a former member of Ginsburg's 2015 solo band.

== History ==
=== 1998–2001: Formation and early releases ===
Deron Miller and Jess Margera originally met at high school in 1992 and later formed the band Foreign Objects together, releasing The Undiscovered Numbers & Colors in 1995. Within a year, the pair had moved onto playing in a band named Oil, which featured live bassist Andy Smith and later Ryan Bruni, releasing the EPs Lifelines and Oil in 1996 and 1997, respectively. The trio met Chad I Ginsburg, who was then working as an audio engineer, during recording sessions for their planned debut full-length album, and later enlisted him to finalize the first lineup of Camp Kill Yourself, a name which Miller conceived as "a perfect title for a horror movie". The first name Miller proposed for the band was I Dismember Mama, after the 1972 horror film of the same name. Ginsburg had previously performed in the band Rudy & Blitz, which had signed with Columbia Records sub-label Ruffhouse in 1995 and recorded an album, though it was not released.

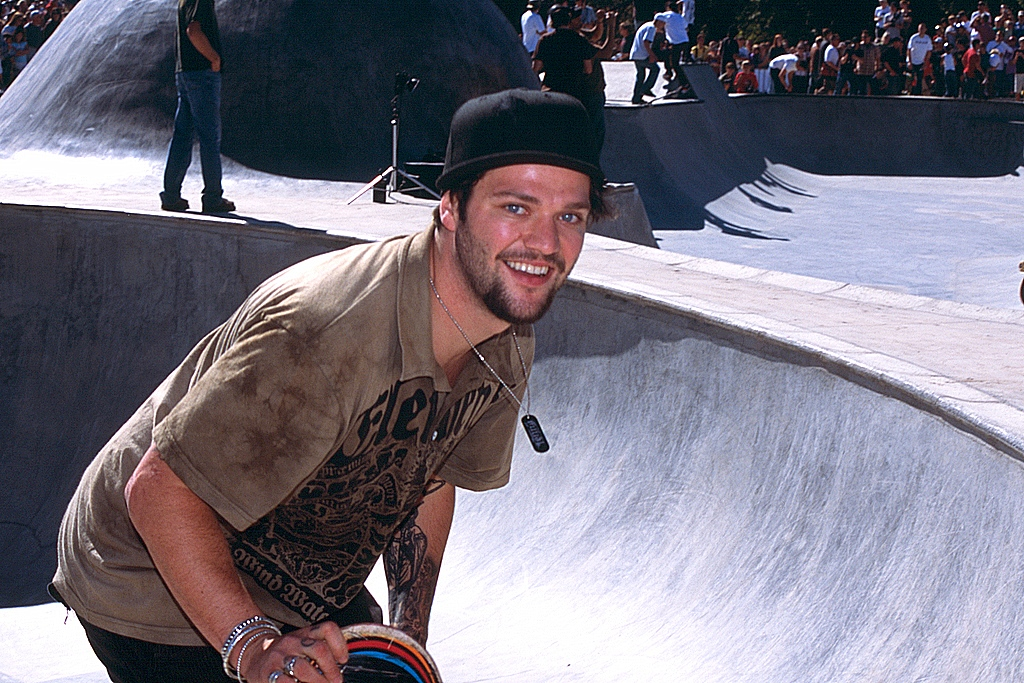
CKY gained exposure by contributing music to videos produced by Bam Margera, brother of drummer Jess.

The band recorded its debut album between November 1997 and February 1998 at The Ground Hog Studio in Holland, Pennsylvania. Speaking about the recording process to Guitar.com, Miller explained that the whole album took around two years to finish, mainly due to financial challenges, and that the writing process totalled up to four years. Many of the sessions were funded by the frontman's father. The music's first exposure came in one of Bam Margera's early stunt videos, Jump Off a Building, which featured the track "Genesis 12a"; Margera would later enlist the band to provide music for his later videos, including the first CKY video in 1999. CKY's debut albums, Volume 1 and Volume 2, were released in February 1999, made up mostly of the tracks featured in Bam's videos.

In promotion of Volume 1, CKY joined the 1999 Warped Tour, although after taking part in a protest started by fans regarding vending prices they were removed from the tour. Later in the year, the band signed a record deal with Volcom Entertainment, who reissued Volume 1 twice in early 2000 – firstly under the title CKY, crediting the group as Camp, and secondly under the title Camp, crediting the group as CKY. In February, the group fired Bruni as they were "disappointed by his abilities and performance" on the Warped Tour, and he was replaced by Vernon Zaborowski in July, after Ginsburg briefly filled in on bass. The band returned to the Warped Tour in 2000, and the limited edition EP Disengage the Simulator was released later in the year. CKY's music began appearing on Jackass in October 2000, which is said to have generated "a flood of new fans".

=== 2001–2004: Infiltrate•Destroy•Rebuild and chart success ===
In May 2001, CKY ended their partnership with Volcom and signed with The Island Def Jam Music Group. After more remastered reissues of Volume 1, the band recorded its second studio album Infiltrate•Destroy•Rebuild between November 2001 and January 2002, and released it in September 2002. The album gave the band its first experience of chart success, when it reached number 99 on the US Billboard 200. The single "Flesh into Gear" also charted, reaching number 39 on the Billboard Mainstream Rock chart.

The group began touring the United States in promotion of the album, but in November was invited by Guns N' Roses frontman Axl Rose to perform in Vancouver as the opening warm-up act for the Chinese Democracy Tour, just three days before it was due to begin. Speaking about the news, Margera revealed that CKY had to cancel two of their own shows in California in order to travel to the Guns N' Roses concert, but admitted that he was "psyched because that's probably the biggest tour of [the] year". However, due to a delayed flight blamed on "mechanical troubles", Rose failed to arrive to Vancouver in time and the show had to be cancelled, inciting riots started by audience members. It was later announced that CKY would return to perform on the remainder of the United States leg of the tour, which was scheduled to run until January 2003. It was ultimately cancelled almost a month early.

CKY toured throughout the rest of 2003 on the Out on the Noose Again Tour, which was delayed when Ginsburg broke his tailbone after falling down a flight of stairs. The band secured a high-profile support slot for Metallica in May 2003, after frontman James Hetfield personally approached Miller with the opportunity. The band's first video album, Infiltrate•Destroy•Rebuild: The Video Album, was released in November 2003, featuring music videos for all ten tracks from the 2002 album as well as "96 Quite Bitter Beings" and "Disengage the Simulator", behind-the-scenes features, and a three-hour documentary titled "CKY: Chopped & Sliced". Two-track EP Hellview was also released in 2003.

=== 2004–2006: An Answer Can Be Found and Matt Deis ===
Matt Deis joined CKY as the band's first full-time bassist in July 2005, performing with the band until May 2010.

On April 7, 2004, the band returned to the studio to begin recording the follow-up to Infiltrate•Destroy•Rebuild. Band members periodically offered updates on the album, with Miller labelling it a "masterpiece" and "the best rock record of 2005", and Ginsburg calling it "an instant classic". Zaborowski was fired from the band in June 2004, with Ginsburg once again filling in on bass for a number of live shows. "Familiar Realm" was released as the lead single from the new album in May 2005, reaching number 32 on the Mainstream Rock chart. An Answer Can Be Found followed in June, reaching number 35 on the Billboard 200. According to Nielsen SoundScan, the album sold 27,786 copies in the United States in its first week of release.

It was announced in July 2005 that former All That Remains bassist Matt Deis had replaced Zaborowski, performing his first show with the band on July 18 at the Whisky a Go Go in West Hollywood, California. The new lineup set out on tour to promote An Answer Can Be Found, joining the Rock Adio Tour arranged by skateboarding company Adio Footwear with Fireball Ministry and The Knives, which ran between August and September. Later tour dates included a headline performance at Skate Fest in Worcester, Massachusetts, a UK stint with Clutch between September and October, and a North American tour with Avenged Sevenfold in early 2006.

The band ended its partnership with Island in April 2006. Speaking at the time, Miller explained that the band had been asking to leave the label since 2003, claiming it "had no idea how to market a band that doesn't write songs about breaking up with their girlfriends".

=== 2006–2010: Roadrunner, Carver City and touring ===
In December 2006, it was announced that CKY had signed a global recording contract with Roadrunner Records, a label which both Miller and Margera praised. Recording for the band's fourth studio album began at Ginsburg's Studio CIG Pennsylvania in January 2007. In March it was reported that the band had almost finished recording the album, with the song titles "Hellions on Parade" and "The Boardwalk Body" being confirmed. Speaking about the production process, Margera commented that the band was approaching it differently than it did for An Answer Can Be Found, which he described as "a total guitar record". The band released another update in August, naming a number of new tracks and claiming that the album would be "easily out" by March or April 2008.

However, in October 2007 it was reported that there were internal tensions within the band. MTV reported that "there's trouble in the world of CKY", explaining that an altercation had broken out between Miller and Ginsburg following an incident after a gig in St. Louis, Missouri. Each of the two had different recollections of the situations – Ginsburg proposed that Miller had "quit CKY to pursue his own band", and that he and Margera would continue CKY without him; Miller retorted by claiming that he had, according to MTV, "overheard several of his bandmates talking smack about him in St. Louis", after which he took a brief break from the group in the hope that he would receive an apology from his bandmates. After around a year with no updates, it was reported in October 2008 that the band was almost finished with the upcoming album. Recording was completed by November.

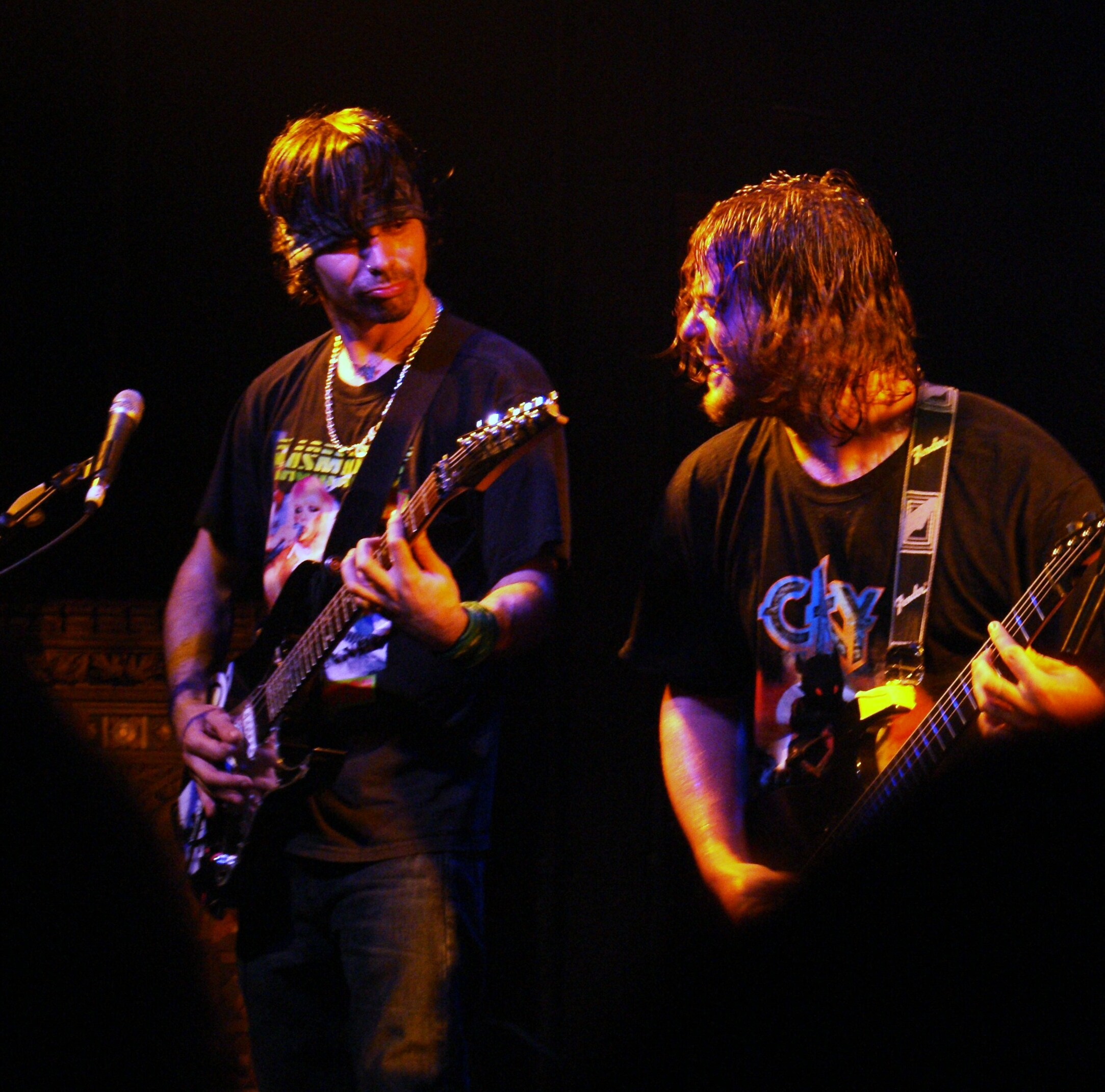
Chad Ginsburg (left) and former frontman Deron Miller during a tour in support of Carver City in 2009

Carver City was officially announced in January. Miller described the album as "the most collaborative and focused CKY effort to date", while Ginsburg applauded it as "more inventive and more layered than our past releases ... the most inspired album we have ever made". "Hellions on Parade" was released as the first single from the album in April, followed by "A#1 Roller Rager" on May 4. Carver City was released later in the month, charting at number 46 on the Billboard 200 and selling 11,000 copies in the US in its first week.

CKY began touring in promotion of Carver City in June 2009, performing dates in North America with support acts ASG and Graveyard until August, when the run ended with a "hometown show" in Philadelphia. Later in the year the band visited several countries in Europe, and in January 2010 played in Japan for the first time. Later tour dates in 2010 included performances at Sonisphere Festival in the UK on August 1, which Miller described as "he biggest highlight of CKY's summer touring schedule by far", and shows in Australia and New Zealand.

=== 2010–2014: B-Sides & Rarities and Miller's departure ===
In May 2010, it was announced on CKY's official website that Deis "could no longer commit" to the band. He was later replaced by Matt "Matty J" Janaitis. In September the band released the single "Afterworld", which was the first song by the band to feature vocals by Ginsburg. The song was written for the third Jackass film, Jackass 3D, and was included in its closing credits upon release in October. It was later revealed that the song would also be featured on an upcoming compilation album titled B-Sides & Rarities, which featured a number of previously unreleased and out-of-print tracks and was released in March 2011. In promotion of the album, CKY completed a US tour in March. B-Sides & Rarities was later released on vinyl featuring a number of additional tracks in September 2011.

The future of the band was once again cast into doubt in July 2011, when members disagreed about its future. In a video titled "CKY – What Next?", Miller noted that he and Margera had the idea for each of the band's members to record individual albums and then release them as an overall "CKY" package, which Janaitis also supported. However, Ginsburg was opposed to the plan, claiming that he would prefer to record a follow-up to Carver City. Miller presented an alternate version of events in an interview in October 2015, claiming that it was Ginsburg's idea initially to produce albums in other bands (Miller in World Under Blood, Ginsburg in Rudy & Blitz and Margera in The Company Band), before a disagreement between the guitarist and his former bandmates left him without a side project. The rift escalated in the days and weeks following the release of the video, as Miller claimed on his Facebook page that Ginsburg had left the band, before himself announcing that he too would be "throwing the towel in" after completing the group's upcoming shows. Margera cited Miller's alcohol abuse as one of the causes of the tensions. The band performed a show dubbed "Christmas with CKY" on December 18 in Reading, Pennsylvania, which Ginsburg labelled on Twitter as the last CKY show.

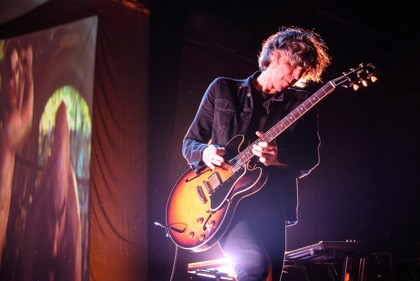
Following Deron Miller's departure, CKY performed a number of shows with Daniel Davies as frontman.

CKY returned in February 2012 with Year Long Disaster vocalist and guitarist Daniel Davies in place of founding frontman Miller, performing at the Australian festival Soundwave. In an interview at the festival with The Pit FM, the band claimed that they intended to record new CKY material with Davies later that year. After a year without CKY news, in March 2013 Margera posted on the "Ask CKY" section of the band's website to assure fans that the status of the group was still unclear, although he also noted that "5 or 6 awesome songs" had been written with Ginsburg and Janaitis which may be released as CKY. In October, Miller made a statement that he had changed his mind about relinquishing the band's moniker, and noted that he would be recording a new CKY album for a 2014 release whether he could reconcile with the other band members or not.

=== 2014–2021: Frontman changes and The Phoenix ===
In January 2014, Miller and Ginsburg shared a number of new photos of them together with guitars, indicating a potential reunion for the band. Miller expanded on the news on his Facebook page, revealing that he had reached out to "almost all former members" of the band but was unsure as to who would return, and that he and Ginsburg were working on at least eight songs together. Another update was issued in March, with Miller revealing that he and Ginsburg had "collaborated on a very mellow, melancholy song idea" recently, and that he wanted the new CKY album to serve as the soundtrack to a planned documentary about the band. Miller confirmed on February 12, 2015, that the reconciliation hadn't worked out, claiming that working with Ginsburg was "so irritating and so stressful [he] had no choice but to cut the chord". That same day, it was announced that CKY would be performing at Canadian festival Amnesia Rockfest in June. Miller claimed that he knew nothing about the show and Ginsburg asserted that his focus was on his upcoming solo album, although it was confirmed by Bam Margera that Jess would be involved in the show. The band played the festival with Davies returning as frontman. However, Miller also used the CKY moniker (as "CKY + Foreign Objects") for a number of shows booked in 2015 with guitarist Kenneth Hunter, bassist Shaun Luera and drummer Tim Luera. In an interview with The Sinner's Ball radio show in August 2015, Miller described his former bandmates as "pathetic sons of bitches" and condemned Davies' performances in the band as "embarrassing". In a later interview in October, Miller claimed that he would be re-recording and re-releasing An Answer Can Be Found, as well as a new album, under the name MechaCKY (later renamed 96 Bitter Beings).

In May 2016, it was confirmed that Ginsburg, Margera and Deis would be continuing as a three-piece CKY (with the guitarist also singing), performing at the Random Hero Festival (in honour of deceased CKY crew member Ryan Dunn) in Cleveland, Ohio, in June and recording a new album in July at Rancho De La Luna in Joshua Tree, California. The following February, the band announced its first tour as a three-piece, with 12 shows in the UK (their first in the country since 2011) scheduled for May 2017. Due to "popular demand", a second date at London's Camden Underworld was later added to the end of the tour, while several other shows were upgraded to larger venues. The group also performed at all dates on the 2017 Warped Tour, which ran between June 16 and August 6, 2017, and included 41 shows in the United States and Canada. In March 2017, CKY signed a worldwide deal with Entertainment One Music, and released their fifth studio album, The Phoenix, that June. Throughout October and November 2017, CKY toured the United States as the opening act for HIM on HIM's farewell tour.

On November 22, 2018, the band released an EP titled Too Precious to Kill. A vinyl-only release, it features three new songs and a GG Allin cover, "Bite It You Scum". The EP was released to streaming services the following year.

On June 3, 2019, the band announced that Deis had left the band. In a statement by Deis, the bassist explained that "I'm stepping aside to focus on myself and my family so that CKY can continue their dominant return with nothing holding it back." Former A Life Once Lost bassist Chris Weyh performed with the band for the Vans Warped Tour 25th anniversary show. Ginsburg and Margera performed as a duo using backing tracks for a subsequent European tour. CKY released "Fuck.Shit.Help. & Yeah" featuring late Turbonegro frontman Hank von Hell, alongside Anders Odden from Cadaver, on November 26, 2021.

=== 2022–present: New Reason to Dream ===
Ginsburg indicated in August 2022 that work on a new CKY album had begun. The band also announced that they would be performing at the Blue Ridge Rock Festival on September 7, 2023. In May 2024, the band is set to complete its first US tour in over five years, the New Reason to Dream Tour, to mark its 25th anniversary. On April 30, 2024, Ginsburg confirmed the upcoming album title as New Reason to Dream. He also said that the album is in the mixing process, and will be released independently.

In November 2024, CKY was removed from a tour of the UK and Ireland in support of Alien Ant Farm, after frontman Dryden Mitchell accused Ginsburg of punching him in the face in the last of a string of incidents also involving members of the road crew and other bands. Their planned co-headlining tour of Australia and New Zealand was also called off, with Drowning Pool replacing CKY on the line-up. On March 9, 2025, the band announced that former live bassist Vernon Zaborowski had returned to fill in for an injured Ronnie Elvis James during the band's set for Tool's Live in the Sand festival in Punta Cana, Dominican Republic. In July 2025, the band announced Mike Leon (ex-Soulfly) as its new full-time bassist.

On October 10, 2025, CKY released its first new song in eight years, "Can't Stop Running". A short tour of the UK followed, during which Ginsburg attracted criticism again when support act Blackgold accused him of "narcissism", leading to them cancelling their performance at the final date of the run. On February 20, 2026, Leon announced that he had left the band due to "unprofessionalism" and "lack of accountability" by Ginsburg, claiming that "In all of my years of working in this industry, I have never experienced this level of toxicity from an individual".

On 14 August 2026, the band released a new single, titled "Beware of the Heartless", featuring the late Brent Hinds of Mastodon.

== Musical style ==
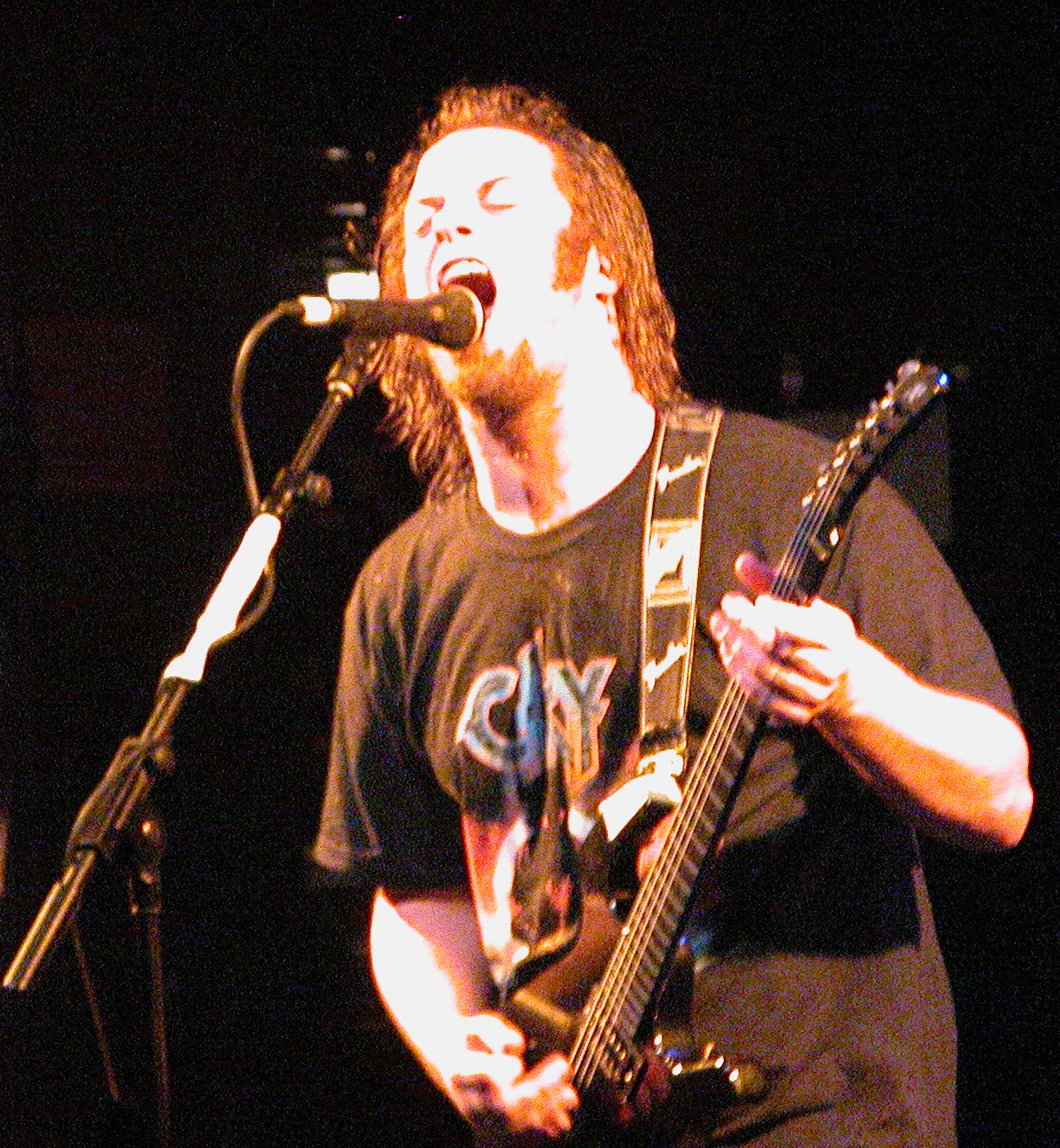
Founding frontman Deron Miller wrote the majority of the band's lyrics and music during his tenure.

=== Music ===
A number of music critics have stated that it as difficult to categorize CKY into a specific musical genre. The band is categorized by AllMusic as post-grunge, hard rock, and stoner rock. Due to the band's association with professional skateboarding (owed mainly to its link with Bam Margera), its music has been dubbed as skate punk, but it is suggested by AllMusic's Greg Prato that this label was extinguished upon the release of Infiltrate•Destroy•Rebuild, which features a "heavy alt-metal sound". The group's sound has been described as stoner metal by Rolling Stone's Jenny Eliscu. Writers at both Blabbermouth.net and the Ultimate Guitar Archive have described CKY as "genre-defying", while PopMatters reviewer Nikki Tranter described the sound on Infiltrate•Destroy•Rebuild as "impossible to label".

=== Lyrics ===
CKY's lyrics cover a wide variety of themes. On Infiltrate•Destroy•Rebuild, it is proposed by Tranter that a number of tracks are written about "the decaying state of humanity" and "the need for some kind of freedom", with the writer describing the lyrics as "relentlessly dark, yet beautifully written, observant and real". On An Answer Can Be Found, there are multiple songs said to be renouncing the idea of suicide. The band has also written songs as part of ongoing storylines on a number of occasions – "96 Quite Bitter Beings", "Escape from Hellview" and "Hellions on Parade" (as well as an early demo called "Thanks for the Ride") make up a series of songs about a fictional town called Hellview, the residents of which "doesn't take kindly to outsiders", and the songs on Carver City tell a story of a town named after a fisherman, who killed his crew and later returns to "curse the city".

== Fanbase ==
The fanbase of CKY is affectionately dubbed the CKY Alliance, and has been identified as particularly passionate about the band. Miller has proposed that the Alliance is "almost more important than the band", praising them as instrumental in the band's success. Following the release of Infiltrate•Destroy•Rebuild, members of the Alliance "bombarded" Rolling Stone magazine with "pissed-off e-mails" after it awarded the album two out of five stars in a negative review. After they followed this with another poor review of An Answer Can Be Found, Miller responded to writer Jenny Eliscu, mocking her as "an aging, ugly skank" and mocking Rolling Stone themselves as "predictable, tiresome and unprofessional" to have even employed her. The band's fans followed by waging a "harassment campaign" against her, which included phoning and emailing her with death threats.

== Critical reception ==
Common points of commendation include the band's mix of various musical styles, the guitar performances of Miller and Ginsburg, the group's high production values, and the experimental nature of many songs. Other commentators, however, have identified and criticized a reliance on similar styles for multiple songs – An Answer Can Be Found, for example, was criticized by a number of sources a lack of progression and invention. A similar sentiment was echoed in relation to Carver City by Blabbermouth.net writer Keith Bergman.

== Members ==
Current members

- Jess Margera – drums, percussion (1998–present); backing vocals (2015–present)
- Chad I Ginsburg – lead guitar, keyboards (1998–present), lead vocals, rhythm guitar (2015–present), bass (1998–2005, in-studio only), backing vocals (1998–2015)

Former members

- Deron Miller – lead vocals, rhythm guitar, keyboards (1998–2011), bass (1998–2005, in-studio only)
- Matt Deis – bass, backing vocals, keyboards (2005–2010, 2015–2019)
- Matt "Matty J" Janaitis – keyboards (2009–2010; touring); bass (2010–2012); backing vocals (2009–2012)
- Mike Leon – bass, backing vocals (2025–2026)

Former touring musicians

- Ryan Bruni – bass, backing vocals (1998–2000)
- Vernon Zaborowski – bass, backing vocals (2000–2004, 2025)
- Rob "Murry" Valeno – keyboards, backing vocals (2010–2011)
- Daniel Davies – lead vocals, rhythm guitar (2012, 2015)
- Matt "Uncle Matt/Shitbird" Cole – keyboards, backing vocals (2017)
- Chris Weyh – bass, backing vocals (2019–2023)
- Ronnie Elvis James – bass, backing vocals (2023–2024)

Timeline

== Discography ==
- Volume 1 (1999)
- Infiltrate•Destroy•Rebuild (2002)
- An Answer Can Be Found (2005)
- Carver City (2009)
- The Phoenix (2017)
- New Reason to Dream (TBA)
