= Infiltrate Destroy Rebuild =

Infiltrate•Destroy•Rebuild

Studio album by CKY
- Released: September 24, 2002
- Recorded: November 2001 – February 2002
- Studio: Audio Resource (Honolulu, Hawaii); Studio 4 (Philadelphia, Pennsylvania); 4th St. Recording (Santa Monica, California); Westlake Audio (Santa Monica, California)
- Genre: Alternative metal; alternative rock; stoner rock
- Length: 33:52
- Label: Island
- Producer: Chad I Ginsburg; Deron Miller

CKY chronology
Volume 2 (1999)	Infiltrate•Destroy•Rebuild (2002)	An Answer Can Be Found (2005)

Singles from Infiltrate•Destroy•Rebuild
- 1. "Flesh into Gear" Released: 2002; 2. "Attached at the Hip" Released: 2002

Infiltrate•Destroy•Rebuild is the second studio album by American rock band CKY. Recorded between November 2001 and February 2002 at studios in Hawaii, Pennsylvania and California, it was produced by the band's lead guitarist and backing vocalist Chad I Ginsburg with lead vocalist and guitarist Deron Miller and released on September 24, 2002, by Island Records. The album was the band's first to chart, reaching number 99 on the US Billboard 200.

In contrast to CKY's 1999 debut album Volume 1, the songwriting for which was originally credited solely to the band's frontman Miller, Infiltrate•Destroy•Rebuild featured equal songwriting credits for all three members of the band, including lead guitarist Ginsburg and drummer Jess Margera. Once again, bass on the album was performed by Miller (as well as some by Ginsburg), with live bassist Vernon Zaborowski (who replaced Ryan Bruni in 2000) left off the record completely.

Much like its predecessor, Infiltrate•Destroy•Rebuild was praised by a number of music critics for its wide range of musical styles, as well as specific elements such as its guitar riffs. Music videos were produced by Bam Margera and Joe Frantz for all ten tracks on the album, which were released on the video album Infiltrate Destroy Rebuild: The Video Album in 2003. "Flesh into Gear" was released as a single in 2002, reaching number 38 on the Billboard Mainstream Rock chart.

== Recording and production ==
Recording for Infiltrate•Destroy•Rebuild took place at Audio Resource in Honolulu, Hawaii, Studio 4 in Philadelphia, Pennsylvania, and 4th St. Recording and Westlake Audio in Santa Monica, California; mixing was completed at Westlake Audio. Production was led by guitarist Chad I Ginsburg, with vocalist Deron Miller credited as a co-producer. Ginsburg also mixed the album, which was mastered by Howie Weinberg. Recording began in November 2001 and was completed by February 2002.

Many of the songs featured on the album were written and recorded in the form of demos years previously: early recordings of "Flesh into Gear" (originally titled "Sinking Fast"), "Sink into the Underground", "Attached at the Hip", "Plastic Plan" (originally titled "No Such Thing"), "Inhuman Creation Station" and "Sporadic Movement" were featured on the videos CKY2K and CKY 3, and an early version of "Close Yet Far" (under the title "Fairman's Song") was included on the original pressing of Volume 2.

Unlike on Volume 1, where songwriting was credited to Miller alone, writing for Infiltrate•Destroy•Rebuild was credited to all three band members: Miller, Ginsburg and drummer Jess Margera. The album is also the band's first to feature synthesizers, which were performed by Miller and Ginsburg. At least five additional songs were recorded for potential inclusion on the album. At the end of the albums closer, "Close Yet Far", the 4 drum stick count-in for a hidden song can be heard, but the album ends after the fourth count. The tracks did not make the final cut: "Dropped and Doublecrossed", "Testing", "Woe Is Me", "Just Quit (Sarcasm)", and "Step to CKY" (an early version of "Dropped") was released on Volume 2, which was later reworked and released officially on the band's 2009 fourth studio album Carver City under the name "Plagued by Images". "Testing" is a song by Margera's and Miller's previous band, Foreign Objects, and was intended to be a hidden track. "Woe Is Me" was released on Carver City under the same name. The 2002 recording of "Just Quit (Sarcasm)" was later released on the band's 2005 album An Answer Can Be Found as "Deceit Is Striking Gold".

== Promotion and release ==
CKY continued its affiliation with the video series of the same name, as several early recordings of songs from Infiltrate•Destroy•Rebuild were featured on the videos CKY2K and CKY3 prior to the release of the album. The album was released on September 24, 2002, as an enhanced CD featuring music videos for "Flesh into Gear" and "Attached at the Hip", although the original pressing had a glitch which prevented the videos from playing. "Flesh into Gear" was also released as a single, reaching number 38 on the US Billboard Mainstream Rock chart.

The group began touring the US in promotion of the album, but in November was invited by Guns N' Roses frontman Axl Rose to perform in Vancouver as the opening warm-up act for the Chinese Democracy Tour, just three days before it was due to begin. However, due to a delayed flight blamed on "mechanical troubles", Rose failed to arrive to Vancouver in time and the show had to be canceled, inciting riots started by audience members. It was later announced that CKY would return to perform on the remainder of the United States leg of the tour, which was ultimately canceled almost a month early. CKY toured extensively in promotion of the album, with high-profile slots supporting bands such as Metallica.

In November 2003, the band released Infiltrate Destroy Rebuild: The Video Album, featuring music videos for all ten tracks on the album, as well "96 Quite Bitter Beings" and "Disengage the Simulator", behind-the-scenes footage, a photo gallery, and a documentary titled "CKY: Chopped & Sliced".

== Composition ==
=== Lyrics ===
Speaking about the lyrics on Infiltrate Destroy Rebuild, PopMatters writer Nikki Tranter proposed that many of the songs on the album are written about "the decaying state of humanity", in contrast to the possibly more common themes of "odes to ex-girlfriends or a corrupt governmental structure". The reviewer also noted that many songs "deal with [a] need for some kind of freedom", noting "Close Yet Far", "Attached at the Hip", "Frenetic Amnesic" and "Sink into the Underground" as examples of this description.

"Escape from Hellview" is the third song in the band's "Hellview" song series, which started with previous band Oil's "Thanks for the Ride" and Volume 1's opening track "96 Quite Bitter Beings". The track is described by Bradley Torreano of music website AllMusic as an "infectious tale of friends hanging from trees and the deafening silence of loneliness".

=== Music ===
Many reviews of the album noted the variety of musical styles present on Infiltrate•Destroy•Rebuild, which was described in a positive manner. AllMusic's Torreano dubbed "Escape from Hellview" a "metal anthem", suggested that "Plastic Plan" showcased a "disco beat and lifting melodies", and described "Sporadic Movement" as "gothic metal". Tranter of PopMatters offered many of the same descriptions in her review, also describing "Close Yet Far" as a "sultry pop-rock ballad" and including "Flesh into Gear" and "Frenetic Amnesic" alongside "Escape from Hellview" in the bracket of "neat heavy rock tunes". She concluded that the album is "impossible to label".

A review on Punknews.org suggested that many bands mix musical genres and "end up sounding pieced together and unnatural", contrasting that CKY's attempt gave them "a sound distinctly their own", highlighting the guitar riffs, electronic elements, and distortion effects as contributing factors. Billboard magazine described its sound as "sometimes reminiscent of classic metal ... [with] a jagged punk edge", describing the material as "aggressive, yet melodic".

== Reception ==
=== Commercial ===
Infiltrate•Destroy•Rebuild was the first album released by CKY to register on a music chart, reaching number 99 on the US Billboard 200. Outside of the US, it also reached number 108 on the UK Albums Chart and number 10 on the UK Rock & Metal Albums Chart. According to Miller, as of August 2015 the album had sold over 315,000 copies, making it the best-selling CKY album.

=== Critical ===
Professional ratings
Review scores
Source	Rating
AllMusic	4/5 stars
Billboard	Favorable
PopMatters	Favorable
Punknews.org	3.5/5 stars
Rock Hard	6/10
Rolling Stone	2/5 stars

Media response to Infiltrate•Destroy•Rebuild was generally positive. AllMusic's Torreano awarded the album four out of five stars, describing it as "an irony-free exploration of heavy music that goes straight for the gut and keeps on punching". He praised the band's variety of styles on the release, highlighting tracks such as "Escape from Hellview" and "Sporadic Movement". PopMatters writer Tranter was similarly positive, describing IDR as "an album of expert modern rock tunes, bursting with intelligent ... lyrics and first-rate, progressive musical experimentation".

Punknews.org's review praised the album's writing and production, noting that it is "a definite progression from their previous work" but claiming that it "has some brief moments that become almost too poppy for its own good", namely on "Plastic Plan".

== Track listing ==
All tracks are written by Deron Miller with Chad I Ginsburg and Jess Margera.

No.	Title	Length
1.	"Escape from Hellview"	3:42
2.	"Flesh into Gear"	3:06
3.	"Sink into the Underground"	2:58
4.	"Attached at the Hip"	2:59
5.	"Frenetic Amnesic"	3:21
6.	"Shock & Terror"	3:07
7.	"Plastic Plan"	3:55
8.	"Inhuman Creation Station"	4:08
9.	"Sporadic Movement"	2:43
10.	"Close Yet Far"	3:53
Total length:		33:52

Enhanced CD bonus videos
No.	Title	Length
11.	"Attached at the Hip" (music video)	3:00
12.	"Flesh into Gear" (music video)	3:03
Total length:		39:55

== Personnel ==
=== CKY ===
- Deron Miller – lead vocals, guitars, bass, Moog synthesizers, co-production
- Chad I Ginsburg – guitars, vocals, bass, Moog synthesizers, production, mixing, photography
- Jess Margera – drums

=== Production ===
- Donat Kazarinoff – engineering, mix engineering
- Marty Bolin – engineering
- Phil Nicolo – engineering
- Joe Fisher – additional engineering
- Jeff Kahn – additional engineering
- Jesse Gorman – mix engineering
- Roger Lian – digital editing
- Howie Weinberg – mastering

=== Artwork ===
- t42design – art direction, design
- Jina Dierolf – additional artwork
- Adam Wallacavage – photography
- Lance Dawes – photography
- Ryan Gee – photography
- Bam Margera – music video direction
- Joe Frantz – music video direction

== Chart positions ==
Chart	Peak position
UK Albums (OCC)	108
UK Rock & Metal Albums (OCC)	10
US Billboard 200	99

== See also ==
- Infiltrate Destroy Rebuild: The Video Album
