= Volume 1 (CKY album) =

- Original cover

Studio album by Camp Kill Yourself
- Released: February 27, 1999
- Recorded: November 1997 – February 1998
- Studio: The Ground Hog Studio (Holland, Pennsylvania)
- Genre: Alternative metal; alternative rock; stoner rock; experimental rock
- Length: 51:57
- Label: Distant; Teil Martin
- Producer: Chad I Ginsburg

Camp Kill Yourself chronology
| Volume 1 (1999) | Volume 2 (1999) |

Alternate cover
- Cover used from 2001 onwards

Singles from Volume 1
- 1. "96 Quite Bitter Beings" Released: 1999

Volume 1 (originally released as a self-titled album under the name Camp Kill Yourself) is the debut studio album by American rock band CKY. Recorded at The Ground Hog Studios in Holland, Pennsylvania, it was produced, engineered and mixed by guitarist Chad I Ginsburg, and originally released on February 27, 1999, by Distant Recordings and Teil Martin International. Since its initial release under the title Camp Kill Yourself, the album has been reissued a number of times by various record labels with different titles and album covers.

Most of the material for Volume 1 was written and arranged by original CKY lead vocalist and guitarist Deron Miller, prior to Ginsburg's addition in 1998 which marked the official formation of the band. During this time, Miller and drummer Jess Margera were performing under the name Oil with live bassist Ryan Bruni. Miller performed bass on the album, although Bruni is featured on the songs "The Human Drive in Hi-Fi" (backing vocals) and "Lost in a Contraption" (additional bass).

Despite not registering on any record charts, Volume 1 is notable in CKY's back-catalogue for featuring a number of the band's signature songs, including arguably their most well-known track "96 Quite Bitter Beings". Many of the songs were originally featured on skateboarding and stunt videos produced by Margera's brother Bam, including the CKY video series with which the band shares its name. "96 Quite Bitter Beings" was released as a single in 1999 and 2010 (remastered).

== Recording and production ==
Deron Miller and Jess Margera began recording Volume 1 in November 1997, while still performing under the name Oil. Recording took place at The Ground Hog Studio in Holland, Pennsylvania, where the pair met one of the studio's audio engineers Chad I Ginsburg. They later asked Ginsburg to join the band as a second guitarist, which marked the dissolution of Oil and the official formation of CKY (under the full name Camp Kill Yourself). The trio continued recording of the album (with production, engineering and mixing led by the new guitarist), which by February 1998 had been completed. It was mastered by Walt Mecleary at Master Blasters, who owned The Ground Hog Studio at the time and had originally hired Ginsburg. Miller and Margera are credited as assistant producers on the record.

According to Miller, the recording process for Volume 1 cost approximately $15,000, most of which (around $12,000) was funded by his father. The band worked in increments due to financial challenges and work schedules, recording one or two songs at a time, and Ginsburg was reportedly paid around $8 per hour for his contribution prior to becoming an official, full-time member of the group. Opening track and lead single "96 Quite Bitter Beings" was the last song written for the album, with Miller noting that he wrote the riff during an impromptu session with Margera at the drummer's house after their normal rehearsal space was flooded.

For the original Distant/Teil Martin pressings of Volume 1, all songwriting was credited to Miller. This was also the case for the Volcom reissues. When the album was reissued by Island Records, the album notes listed "All songs written by Deron Miller with Jess Margera and Chad Ginsburg". In a 2015 interview, Miller dubbed the co-crediting of Ginsburg and Margera for songwriting as "fake" and called it a "cosmetic measure", reiterating the claim that he had written the entire album himself.

== Promotion and release ==
Volume 1 was originally released on February 27, 1999, by Distant Recordings and Teil Martin International limited to 2,500 copies, before another 1,000 copies were pressed from December 12, 1999. The band signed with Volcom Entertainment in 2000, who reissued the album on April 1 in a 2,000-copy run, then a month later limited to 4,000 copies, and finally on October 1 in a 20,000-copy run. Finally, after signing with The Island Def Jam Music Group in 2001, the album began to be released consistently from June 26, 2001 – 5,000 each with blue, orange and purple cover artwork, and unlimited with red.

In promotion of the album, CKY joined the 1999 edition of the Warped Tour, but were later removed after taking part in a protest started by fans regarding vending prices. The group also played on the 2000 tour, at which they first made contact with Island. Later in 2000, the band released an extended play (EP), Disengage the Simulator, which featured tracks from both Volume 1 and compilation Volume 2. In April 2008, a remastered edition of Volume 1 was released featuring a number of bonus tracks recorded live in 2006 for the Live at Mr. Smalls Theatre live album. The album was later remastered by Tom Volpicelli and reissued on vinyl of various colours in 2015 exclusive to Urban Outfitters.

== Title and packaging ==
Volume 1 was originally called Camp Kill Yourself, acting as a self-titled release for the band. The original Volcom reissue credited the band as "Camp", with the album released under the name CKY, before the names were reversed on later editions. The album later took on its final name, Volume 1, once released by Island in 2001. The original album cover featured a painting depicting the infamous public suicide of politician R. Budd Dwyer in 1987. The artwork, produced by Rob Erickson, was later changed when CKY signed with Volcom, as they deemed it too offensive. For Volcom's reissues and most future releases, the cover was changed to artwork featuring a photo of Ginsburg performing on the 1999 Warped Tour. This cover photo was taken by Remy Stratton.

== Reception ==
Professional ratings
Review scores
| Source | Rating |
|---|---|
| AllMusic | 3/5 stars |
| Slant | 3.5/5 stars |

Media response to Volume 1 was mixed to positive. Writing for the website AllMusic, critic Bret Love criticised the album for its variety of musical styles, describing it as "unfortunately ... all over the musical map". Despite describing the release as "just a mix of moshpit-friendly skatepunk pap", he awarded Volume 1 three out of five stars. Slant magazine's Aaron Scott was more positive, praising the vocal and guitar performances on the album, which he described as "more entertaining (and refreshing) than the misogyny that has plagued hard rock of late". Scott went on to note that the band's sound was "not revolutionary", but found value in their individuality. Ultimate Guitar Archive awarded the album a "superb" rating of 9.2 out of 10.

According to Deron Miller, as of August 2015 the album had sold over 222,000 copies, making it the second best-selling CKY release behind Infiltrate•Destroy•Rebuild.

== Track listing ==
All tracks are written by Deron Miller, except where noted.

| No. | Title | Length |
|---|---|---|
| 1. | "96 Quite Bitter Beings" | 3:22 |
| 2. | "Rio Bravo" | 3:10 |
| 3. | "Disengage the Simulator" | 3:04 |
| 4. | "The Human Drive in Hi-Fi" | 3:20 |
| 5. | "Lost in a Contraption" | 3:23 |
| 6. | "Knee Deep" | 3:36 |
| 7. | "My Promiscuous Daughter" | 3:17 |
| 8. | "Sara's Mask" | 5:01 |
| 9. | "To All of You" (includes hidden track "Rio Bravo Reprise/Halfway House") | 23:44 |
| Total length: | | 51:57 |

2008 remastered edition
| No. | Title | Length |
|---|---|---|
| 1. | "96 Quite Bitter Beings" | 3:29 |
| 2. | "Rio Bravo" | 3:10 |
| 3. | "Disengage the Simulator" | 3:03 |
| 4. | "The Human Drive in Hi-Fi" | 3:20 |
| 5. | "Lost in a Contraption" | 3:22 |
| 6. | "Knee Deep" | 3:35 |
| 7. | "My Promiscuous Daughter" | 3:16 |
| 8. | "Sara's Mask" | 5:01 |
| 9. | "To All of You" | 4:33 |
| 10. | "Rio Bravo" (remix) | 2:22 |
| 11. | "Halfway House" | 4:05 |
| 12. | "The Human Drive in Hi-Fi" (live) | 4:36 |
| 13. | "Flesh into Gear" (live) (written by Miller, Chad I Ginsburg and Jess Margera) | 3:37 |
| 14. | "96 Quite Bitter Beings" (live) | 4:05 |
| 15. | "My Promiscuous Daughter" (live) | 4:22 |
| 16. | "Sara's Mask" (live) | 4:47 |
| 17. | "Rio Bravo" (live) | 3:22 |
| 18. | "Shippensburg" (live) | 3:39 |
| 19. | "Lost in a Contraption" (live) | 3:30 |
| 20. | "Shock & Terror" (live) (written by Miller, Ginsburg and Margera) | 3:24 |
| 21. | "Disengage the Simulator" (live) | 3:42 |
| 22. | "Knee Deep" (live) | 4:56 |
| 23. | "Close Yet Far" (live) (written by Miller, Ginsburg and Margera) | 4:21 |
| Total length: | | 87:36 |

== Personnel ==
=== CKY ===
- Deron Miller – vocals, rhythm guitar, bass
- Chad I Ginsburg – lead guitar
- Jess Margera – drums

=== Additional musicians ===
- Ryan Bruni – backing vocals (track 4), additional bass (track 5)

=== Production ===
- CKY – production
- Chad I Ginsburg – engineering, mixing, mastering (Volcom reissues)
- Walt Mecleary – mastering (original release and Volcom reissues)
- Stephen Marcussen – mastering (Island and future reissues)
- Tom Volpicelli – mastering (Urban Outfitters reissue)

=== Artwork ===
- Rob Erickson – artwork and layout (original release)
- Bam Margera – photography (original release and Volcom reissues)
- Remy Stratton – photography (Volcom and future reissues)
- Ryan Gee – photography (Volcom reissues)
- Lance Dawes – photography (Island reissues)

== Release history ==
| Region | Date | Label | Format | Catalog | Copies | Notes |
|---|---|---|---|---|---|---|
| United States | February 27, 1999 | Distant Recordings | CD | 1DCA3522 | 2,500 | Credited to Camp Kill Yourself as Camp Kill Yourself |
| United States | December 12, 1999 | Distant Recordings | CD | 1DCA3522 | 1,000 | Credited to Camp Kill Yourself as Camp Kill Yourself |
| United States | April 1, 2000 | Volcom Entertainment | CD | YAE-49 | 2,000 | Credited to Camp as CKY |
| United States | May 1, 2000 | Volcom Entertainment | CD | YAE-49 | 4,000 | Credited to CKY as Camp |
| United States | October 1, 2000 | Volcom Entertainment | CD | YAE-49 | 20,000 | Credited to CKY as Camp Volume 1 |
| Worldwide | June 26, 2001 | Island Records | CD+ | 314 586 070-2: IN01 | 5,000 | Credited to CKY as Volume 1; purple cover |
| Worldwide | June 26, 2001 | Island Records | CD+ | 314 586 070-2: IN02 | 5,000 | Credited to CKY as Volume 1; blue cover |
| Worldwide | June 26, 2001 | Island Records | CD+ | 314 586 070-2: IN03 | 5,000 | Credited to CKY as Volume 1; orange cover |
| Worldwide | June 26, 2001 | Island Records | CD+ | 314 586 070-2: IN04 | Unlimited | Credited to CKY as Volume 1; red cover |
| Europe | April 22, 2002 | Mercury Records | CD | 586 070-2 | Unlimited | |
| United States | July 5, 2003 | Distant Recordings | LP | CKY-V1 | 2,000 | Picture disc |
| Worldwide | April 13, 2007 | Distant Recordings | CD | none | Unlimited | Credited to Camp Kill Yourself as Camp Kill Yourself |
| Worldwide | April 7, 2008 | Distant Recordings | DL | 685747038624 | Unlimited | Available from CD Baby and iTunes only |
| United States | November 20, 2015 | Distant Recordings | LP | B018A7B6HU | 1,000 | Exclusive to Urban Outfitters; random colors |
