= Chad I Ginsburg =

American musician (born 1972)

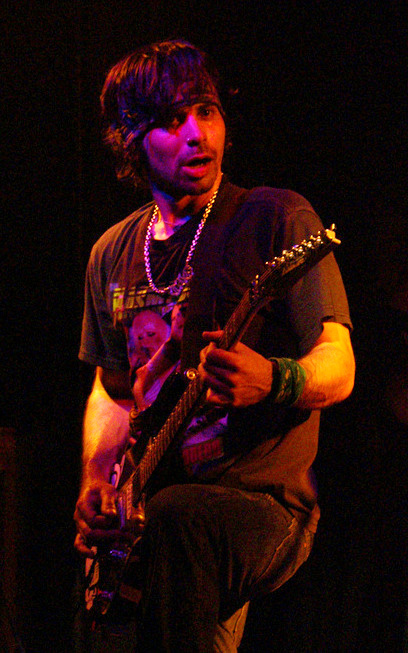
- Ginsburg performing with CKY in 2009

Background information
- Also known as: CiG
- Born: April 24, 1972 (age 54)
- Origin: West Chester, Pennsylvania, U.S.
- Genres: Alternative metal; alternative rock; stoner rock
- Occupations: Musician; record producer
- Instruments: Guitar; vocals; keyboards; bass
- Years active: 1993–present
- Member of: CKY
- Formerly of: Rudy & Blitz; Fuckface Unstoppable

Chad I Ginsburg (born April 24, 1972), also credited as CiG, is an American musician. He is the guitarist, producer and, since the departure of Deron Miller, vocalist of West Chester-based rock band CKY, which he co-founded in 1998. Prior to CKY, Ginsburg performed in the rock band Rudy & Blitz, and in July 2015, released his debut solo album Rock n Roll Alibis.

== Early life ==
Ginsburg was born on April 24, 1972. He began playing guitar at the age of nine years, having previously played the drums. He won his first guitar from a radio station, and later bought an Ibanez guitar based on Def Leppard guitarist Phil Collen's model, which he says was eventually broken by a friend and sold. After initially taking lessons from a number of local instructors, Ginsburg later studied with Richie Kotzen. As a guitarist, Ginsburg draws inspiration from former teacher Kotzen, Steve Vai, Joe Satriani, Paul Gilbert and Yngwie Malmsteen; he has also indicated an affection for the band Black Sabbath.

== Career ==
=== 1993–1998: Early career and Rudy & Blitz ===
Prior to joining CKY, Ginsburg played in the band Rudy & Blitz, as well as "several other bands [he] could care less about[sic]". The group signed to Ruffhouse Records, a sub-label of Columbia Records, in 1995, but were allegedly neglected by the label in favor of other acts, with Ginsburg claiming in 1996 that "Our record has been held up for a really long time ... [it] fuckin' rules and they won't release it. They owe us a lot of money, and a couple vacations." Ruffhouse co-owner Joe Nicolo somewhat backed up Ginsburg's claims, alleging that while Ruffhouse intended to release the record, it was held up by executives at parent label Columbia, who instead wanted to release it through independent label Contract Recordings. The album, Reverb on the Click, was eventually released by Ginsburg's own labels years later.

=== 1998–2011: Mainstream recognition with CKY ===
Ginsburg first met Deron Miller and Jess Margera when the duo began working on the first CKY album (under the band name Oil) at a local studio at which Ginsburg was working as an engineer at the time. Completing the band's lineup in 1998, he performed guitar and bass on Volume 1, and was also credited for the album's production, recording, engineering, and mixing. He subsequently led production on every CKY album.

During the filming of the music video for the song "Escape from Hellview", Ginsburg took part in a stunt which reportedly almost killed him. In the song, there is a lyric which reads "I'm on the loose with my neck in the noose/But hey, I enjoy the intense", which the band decided to match with a visual of Ginsburg hanging from a tree in a noose; however, the knot was not tied securely enough, and Ginsburg claims he "hung there for close to a minute" and "passed out ten seconds in".

After a show in St. Louis, Missouri in 2007, Ginsburg reportedly had an altercation with Miller in the tour bus, after which he claimed Miller had left the band. Miller responded with claims to the contrary, while Ginsburg proposed that he would continue CKY with drummer Jess Margera.

Also in 2007, Ginsburg mixed the album Chapter Two by Viking Skull, a band featuring Jess Margera, and also performed additional guitar on "The Hidden Flame". He later produced the follow-up album Doom, Gloom, Heartache & Whiskey, released in 2008.

=== 2011–2016: CKY tensions and solo album ===
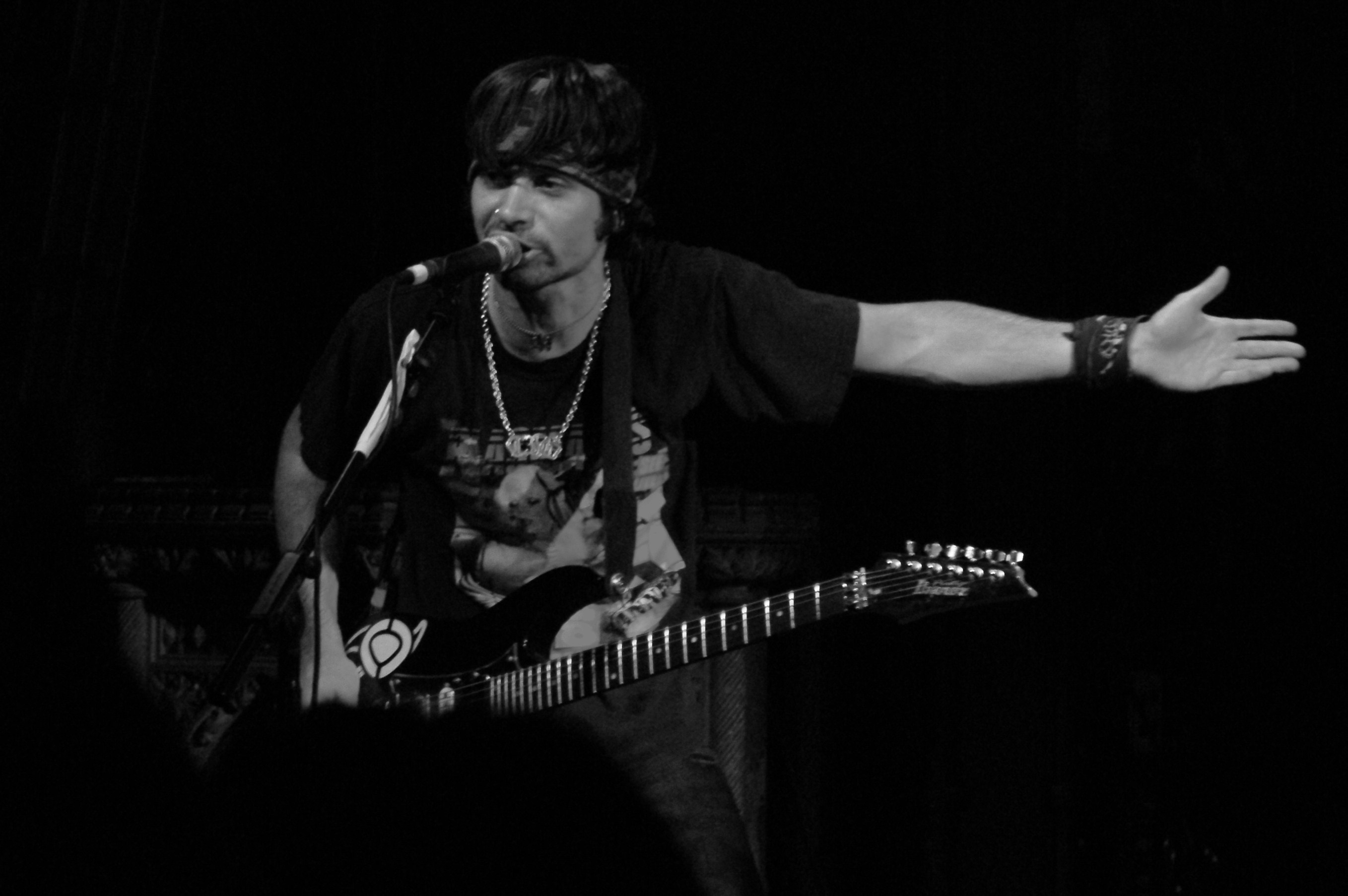
Ginsburg on stage with CKY in 2009

In 2011, Ginsburg was reportedly the source of what Metal Insider writer Zach Shaw described as a "high point of tension", as Ginsburg disagreed with the idea of each band member recording separate solo albums, instead favoring the traditional option of producing another CKY album together. In response, Miller claimed that Ginsburg had officially left the band, and that he would be following suit, leaving the continued future of the group in doubt. Ginsburg, along with Margera and bassist Matt "Matty J" Janaitis, later returned as CKY in 2012 with Year Long Disaster frontman Daniel Davies in place of Miller. This lineup (with Matt Deis in place of Janaitis) later reunited in 2015, following another split with Miller.

Bam Margera later enlisted Ginsburg for his musical project Fuckface Unstoppable, although in January 2013 it was announced that Ginsburg had officially left the band, claiming that he couldn't "witness or enable the downward spiral of [his] long time friends anymore". Further information regarding the departure later emerged, including a blog kept by the tour manager detailing "drug and alcohol fueled antics" which convinced Ginsburg to leave the group.

In June 2015, after many months teasing the news, Ginsburg announced that he would be releasing his debut solo album, Rock n Roll Alibis, on July 7, 2015. The album was written, recorded, produced, mixed and mastered by himself and released by his own label, Generation Overdone Records. He later went on tour to promote the album, enlisting the services of bassist Ronnie Elvis James and drummer Dennis Morehouse to complete the touring lineup of CiG. Ginsburg has since revealed that the next album will feature a full band lineup.

=== 2016–present: Fronting the reformed CKY ===
In May 2016, it was confirmed that Ginsburg would be continuing CKY with Margera and Deis, with Ginsburg also replacing original frontman Miller on lead vocals. The new three-piece lineup performed for the first time at the Random Hero Festival (in honor of deceased CKY crew member Ryan Dunn) in Cleveland, Ohio, in June, and later recorded a new studio album in July at Rancho De La Luna in Joshua Tree, California, in July. The band released its fifth album The Phoenix in June 2017. Ginsburg and Jess are currently working on a new CKY album, titled New Reason to Dream.

== Equipment ==
Speaking in an interview with Guitar.com in 2002, Ginsburg noted that his equipment consisted of Ibanez guitars, a Mesa Boogie head, a Prophecy preamp, a Cry Baby rack and "random floor stomp pedals". Interviewer John Ferrante described his guitar tone as "very distinct", claiming that it "sounds like [Ginsburg uses] a harmonizer". The liner notes of Rock n Roll Alibis stated that Ginsburg used ESP and PRS guitars, Orange amplifiers, Dunlop and Creepy Fingers pedals, as well as d'Addario strings.

== Discography ==
Solo albums

- Rock n Roll Alibis (2015)

CKY

Main article: CKY discography
- Volume 1 (1999)
- Infiltrate•Destroy•Rebuild (2002)
- An Answer Can Be Found (2005)
- Carver City (2009)
- The Phoenix (2017)
- Too Precious to Kill (2018)
- New Reason to Dream (TBA)

Rudy & Blitz

- "Thanks Anyway" (1995)
- Reverb on the Click (2000)
- Philmont Ave. Demo Collection 1993–1995 (2011)

Viking Skull

- Chapter Two (2007) – "The Hidden Flame"

Fuckface Unstoppable

- "All My Friends Are Dead" (2013)
