= Deron Miller =

American musician (born 1976)

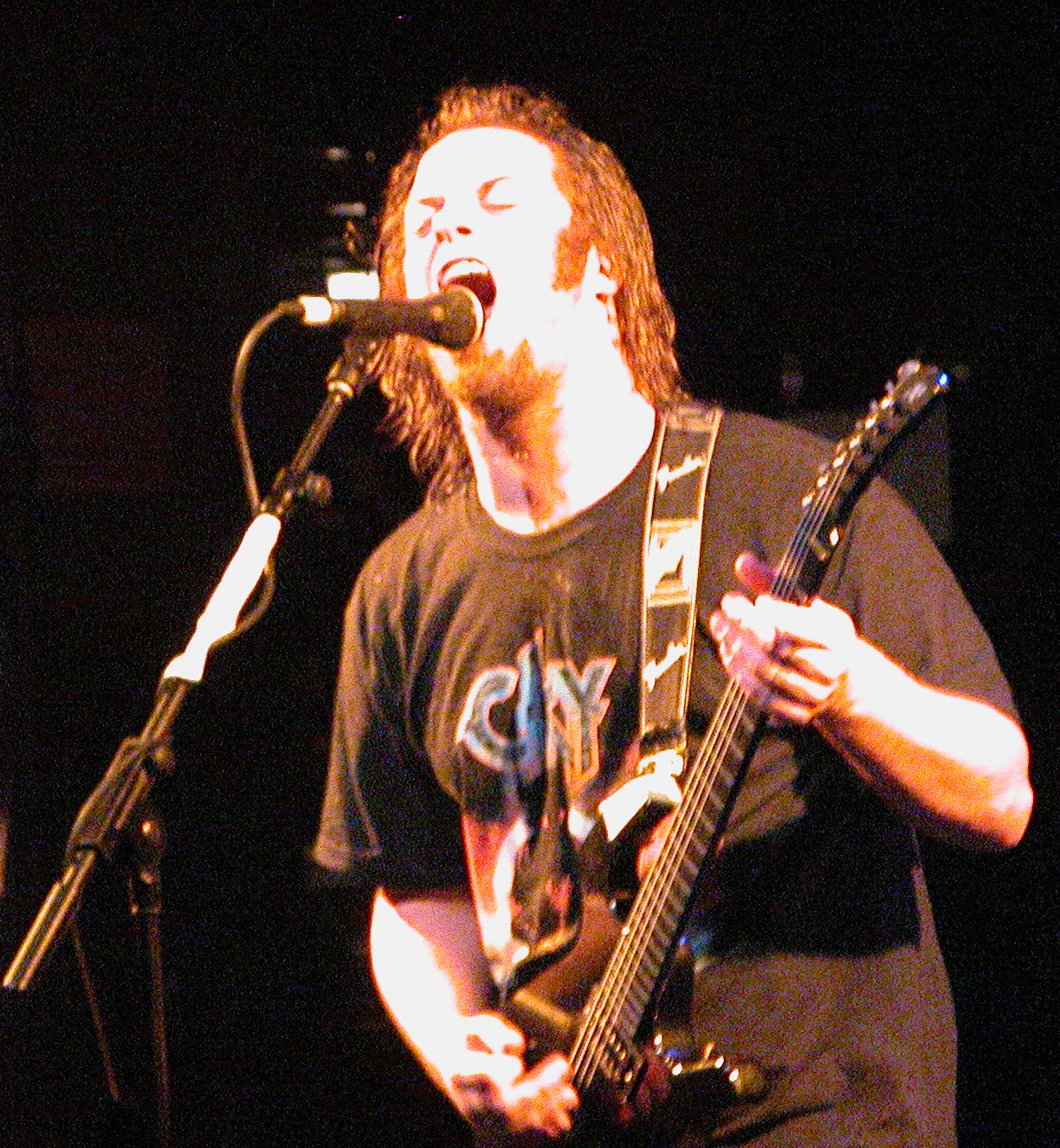
- Miller performing with CKY in 2009

Background information
- Born: Deron John Miller; May 21, 1976 (age 50)
- Origin: West Chester, Pennsylvania, U.S.
- Genre: Rock, heavy metal, extreme metal
- Occupations: Musician; songwriter
- Instruments: Guitar; vocals; bass; keyboards
- Years active: 1995–present
- Member of: Foreign Objects; World Under Blood; 96 Bitter Beings; Malevolent Creation
- Formerly of: CKY

Deron John Miller (born May 21, 1976) is an American musician and songwriter. He is best known as the former lead vocalist and rhythm guitarist of the rock band CKY, which he co-founded in 1998. Other bands Miller fronts include the progressive metal band Foreign Objects, the melodic death metal band World Under Blood, the death metal band Malevolent Creation, and the alternative metal band 96 Bitter Beings.

== Early life ==
Miller has stated that his first musical influence, at the age of three years, was Kiss guitarist Ace Frehley. He started taking guitar lessons at the age of eight, after "losing interest" in playing the piano, and was later influenced by death metal band Death, including vocalist Chuck Schuldiner and guitarist James Murphy, followed by "more extreme music ... and more underground musicians" such as Cynic, Pestilence and Malevolent Creation. He has described his first guitar as a "$50 piece of crap", noting that it was possibly J.C. Penney-branded, followed by an "imitation B.C. Rich" and, later, an Ibanez RG570 in 1992.

== Career ==
=== 1992–2002: Early career, Foreign Objects and CKY ===
Miller played in his first band This End Up in 1992, and later formed Foreign Objects with future CKY drummer Jess Margera, whom he originally met at high school. The band released its debut EP The Undiscovered Numbers & Colors in 1995. Along with bassist Ryan Bruni, the duo later performed under the name Oil, before meeting guitarist Chad I Ginsburg (who was then working as an audio engineer) and changing the name of the band to CKY. Miller is credited with having conceived the name, which stands for "Camp Kill Yourself" and was believed by the frontman to be "a perfect title for a horror movie".

CKY released its debut album Volume 1 in 1999, which originally featured songwriting credits exclusively for Miller. 2002's follow-up Infiltrate•Destroy•Rebuild credited "Deron Miller w/ Chad I Ginsburg and Jess Margera", with Margera being omitted from the formulation for An Answer Can Be Found and Carver City.

=== 2002–2006: Death tribute album and controversies ===
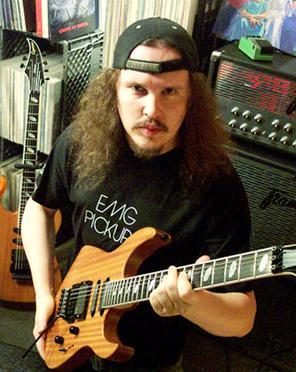
Miller and James Murphy (pictured) worked together on a Death tribute album and the second Foreign Objects release.

In December 2002, it was announced that Miller would be working alongside guitarist James Murphy, drummer Dave Culross and vocalist Bret Hoffmann on a tribute album for the band Death, to benefit the family of founding member Chuck Schuldiner. After Schuldiner's family approved the project, bassist Terry Butler, Slipknot members Mick Thomson (guitar) and Paul Gray (bass), and more joined the project, which was titled Within the Mind: In Homage to the Musical Legacy of Chuck Schuldiner and scheduled for release through Mascot Records.

In addition to their collaboration on the Death tribute album, Miller and Murphy also worked together again on Universal Culture Shock, the second album by Foreign Objects, released in 2004. Murphy contributed lead guitar and mastering to the album, with Miller praising the guitarist for making the album "one thousand times better".

During the build-up to the release of CKY's third studio album An Answer Can Be Found, Miller was involved in a number of controversies with the music media. First, he called out Megadeth frontman Dave Mustaine for threatening to cancel shows at which "Satanic" bands were also scheduled to appear, asking him to "stop creating drama". A few weeks later, he criticised a number of commentators on the website Blabbermouth.net for posting negative comments about CKY, describing them as "lonely, jealous music fans". Following the release of An Answer Can Be Found, Miller also responded to Jenny Eliscu's one-star review of the album for Rolling Stone magazine, describing her as "juvenile" and an "ugly skank", and proposing that she was "not intelligent enough to understand" the band's lyrics. Eliscu responded by complaining to CKY's label, The Island Def Jam Music Group, that the frontman had launched a "harassment campaign" against the journalist, alleging that he had posted her home phone number online, leading to fans calling her with death threats.

=== 2006–2011: World Under Blood and collaborations ===
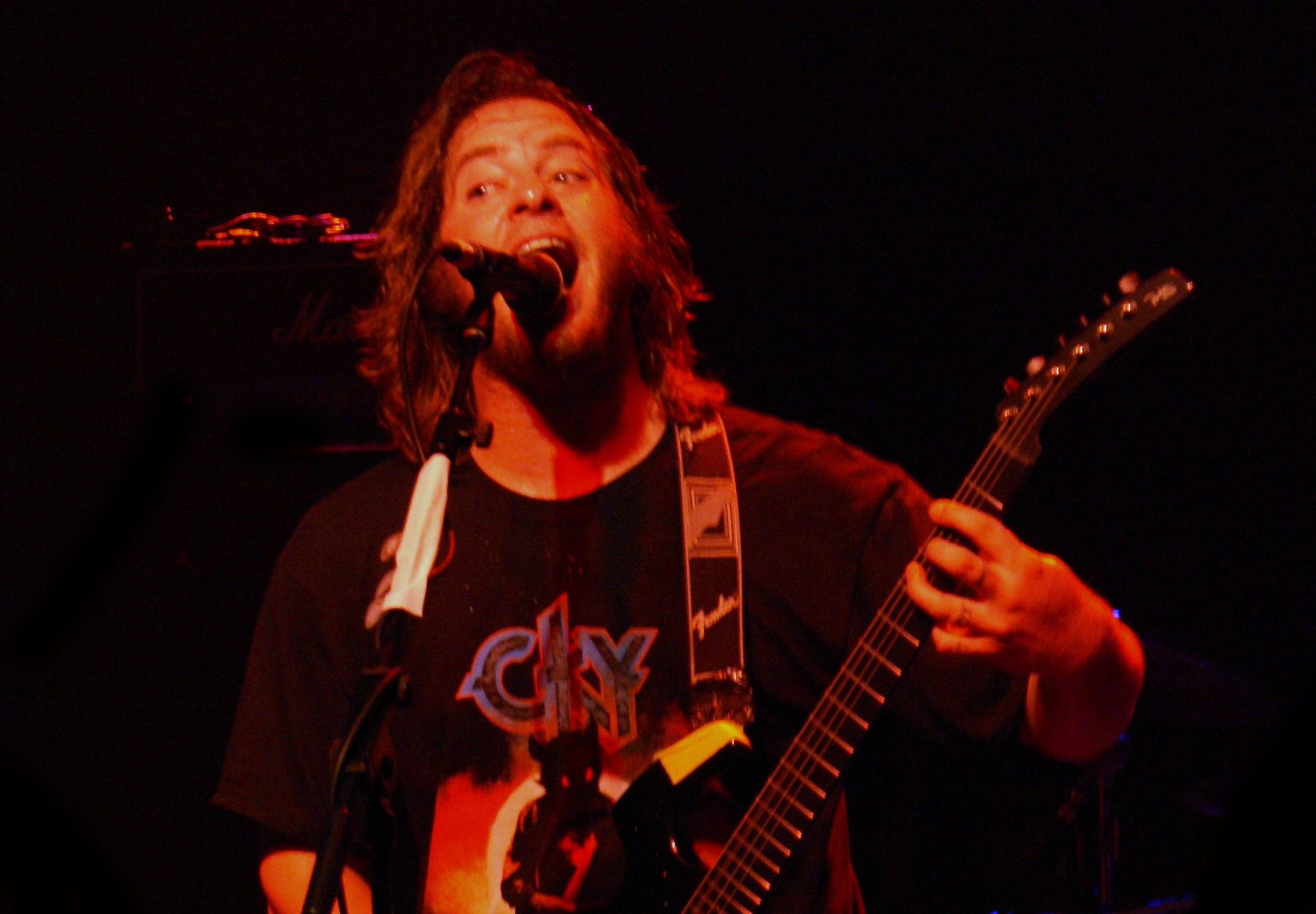
Miller performing in 2009

In October 2006, it was announced that Miller was working with drummer Tim Yeung and producer Logan Mader on a demo for new death metal side project called World Under Blood. The band later released a number of songs on its MySpace page. In 2008, Miller also performed with Malevolent Creation and recorded with thrash metal group Believer, and later also recorded with progressive metal band The Alien Blakk. His Believer contribution later surfaced in the form of a guitar solo on Gabriel opening track "Medwton". World Under Blood's debut full-length album Tactical was eventually released in July 2011 by Nuclear Blast Records.

After a CKY show in St. Louis, Missouri, in 2007, Miller reportedly had an altercation with Ginsburg in the tour bus, after which the guitarist claimed that the frontman had left the band. Miller responded with claims to the contrary, while Ginsburg proposed that he would continue CKY with Margera.

=== 2011–present: CKY departure and recent events ===
The fate of CKY was cast into doubt in 2011, when the band released a video in which each member spoke about their desires for the future of the band; all members but Ginsburg wanted to record solo albums, while the guitarist favoured releasing another CKY album. Miller elaborated on the situation on his Facebook page, claiming that Ginsburg had left the band, and that no one in the "CKY camp" kept him informed of plans and updates, which had led to tensions. Miller was replaced in CKY for the first time since the band's formation in 2012, when former Year Long Disaster frontman Daniel Davies joined for a series of shows at Australian music festival Soundwave. In 2014, Miller reunited with Ginsburg for a planned reunion of the band and a new album, although no further activity was reported and by 2015 he had once again been replaced by Davies.

Since the inactivity of CKY, Miller has released his debut solo album Acoustified!, featuring acoustic recordings of CKY and Foreign Objects songs, as well as resurfaced the Foreign Objects moniker for a new album, Galactic Prey. Both releases were funded via crowdfunding website Indiegogo. In 2016, Miller announced that he was concurrently working on a number of different projects: a deluxe vinyl reissue of CKY's Volume 1, the debut album by MechaCKY (later renamed 96 Bitter Beings), two albums by World Under Blood (Life Is Too Long to Like You and Tetanus Invasive), a new Foreign Objects album entitled Lean, Mean and Bleeding Green, and a sequel to Acoustified! It was later announced that 96 Bitter Beings would be releasing two albums, Synergy Restored and Camp Pain, as part of an Indiegogo campaign.

In 2022, Miller became the new frontman of death metal band Malevolent Creation. He left the band in 2024, but returned in November 2025.

== Equipment ==
Speaking in an interview with Guitar.com in 2002, Miller noted that he played Parker Guitars, including the NiteFly M, P38 and P40 models, with d'Addario strings and the Marshall JCM2000 amplifier. He signed a deal with Jackson Guitars in 2011, then later with Esoterik Guitars in 2014.

== Personal life ==
Miller has been married to actress Felissa Rose since 2004. They have three children.

== Discography ==
Solo albums

- Acoustified! (2013)
- Crude (2024)

with 96 Bitter Beings

- Camp Pain (2018)
- Synergy Restored (2022)
- Return to Hellview (2024)

with CKY

Main article: CKY discography
- Volume 1 (1999)
- Volume 2 (1999)
- Infiltrate•Destroy•Rebuild (2002)
- An Answer Can Be Found (2005)
- Carver City (2009)
- B-Sides & Rarities (2011)

with Foreign Objects

- The Undiscovered Numbers & Colors (1995)
- Universal Culture Shock (2004)
- Galactic Prey (2015)

with World Under Blood

- Tactical (2011)

with Believer

- Gabriel (2009) – "Medwton"

with The Alien Blakk

- Bekoming (2010) – "The Path"
