= Replaceable (CKY song) =

Single by CKY

from the album The Phoenix
- Released: June 2, 2017
- Genre: Alternative rock; stoner rock
- Length: 3:10
- Label: Entertainment One
- Songwriter: Chad I Ginsburg
- Producer: Chad I Ginsburg

CKY singles chronology
"Days of Self Destruction" (2017)	"Replaceable" (2017)	"Head for a Breakdown" (2017)

"Replaceable" is a song by American rock band CKY. Written and produced by the band's vocalist and guitarist Chad I Ginsburg, it is featured as the opening track on the band's 2017 fifth studio album The Phoenix, and was released as the second single from the album on June 2, 2017.

== Composition and lyrics ==
According to the band's lead vocalist, guitarist and producer Chad I Ginsburg, "Replaceable" is a song "about anyone that gets in your way, holds you back or slows your potential with their own blatant insecurity, fears or sickness". Loudwire's Joe DiVita provided an overview of the song upon its release, describing that "A wah-drenched guitar lick sits in the background, easing in as thumping bass notes accent the opening moments, building tension before "Replaceable" explodes with a door-kicking "Oooh!" and the groove takes charge of the track. The toe-tapping verse slides into a fun, horror-esque melody behind an instantly catchy chorus."

== Release and reception ==
"Replaceable" was premiered exclusively on the Loudwire website on June 2, 2017, and was subsequently made available as a digital download for customers who pre-ordered The Phoenix on iTunes. Alternative Press writer Philip Press hailed the song as "the blistering opening cut on [The Phoenix], although Metal Injection's Greg Kennelty claimed that "I just can't help but feel like something is missing without [former CKY frontman Deron Miller's] vocals."

== Personnel ==
- Chad I Ginsburg – vocals, guitars, synthesizers, production, mixing
- Matt Deis – bass, synthesizers
- Jess Margera – drums
