= Days of Self Destruction =

Single by CKY

from the album The Phoenix
- Released: May 1, 2017
- Genre: Alternative metal; stoner rock
- Length: 4:01
- Label: Entertainment One
- Songwriter: Chad I Ginsburg
- Producer: Chad I Ginsburg

CKY singles chronology
"All My Friends Are Dead" (2013)	"Days of Self Destruction" (2017)	"Replaceable" (2017)

"Days of Self Destruction" is a song by American rock band CKY. Written and produced by the band's vocalist and guitarist Chad I Ginsburg, it features additional guitar by Mastodon's Brent Hinds. The track is featured on the band's 2017 fifth studio album The Phoenix, and was released as the first single from the album on May 1, 2017. "Days of Self Destruction" is the first song released by CKY since its return in 2016 following the 2011 departure of original frontman Deron Miller.

== Composition and lyrics ==
"Days of Self Destruction" was the first song recorded by CKY for The Phoenix at Rancho De La Luna in 2016. According to the band's lead vocalist, guitarist and producer Chad I Ginsburg, the track was inspired by the period of uncertainty surrounding the band following the departure of original frontman Deron Miller, with the lyrics based on the concept of "where things could have ended up" and "about the dangers of not learning from your mistakes". Describing the song for Loudwire, Joe DiVita outlined that "A dominant melody opens up the song as [drummer Jess Margera] pounds away at the ride cymbal, cutting through the wall of distortion. There's a bit of a Queens of the Stone Age vibe cut with a southern, bluesy groove ... with some vocal work comparable to Brent Hinds' Mastodon bandmate Troy Sanders."

== Release and reception ==
"Days of Self Destruction" received its worldwide premiere on April 30, 2017 on the BBC Radio 1 Rock Show, presented by Daniel P. Carter. It was released the following day as the first single from The Phoenix, along with an accompanying music video filmed during the album's recording sessions at Rancho De La Luna in 2016. The song received its live debut on the first date of CKY's 2017 UK tour, on May 8 at Brighton's Concorde 2, and was subsequently performed at every date on the tour. Writing for Metal Injection, Greg Kennelty praised Ginsburg's vocal performance on the song, claiming that he "nails it".

== Personnel ==
- Chad I Ginsburg – vocals, guitars, synthesizers, production, mixing
- Matt Deis – bass, synthesizers
- Jess Margera – drums
- Brent Hinds – additional guitar
