= Head for a Breakdown =

Single by CKY

from the album The Phoenix
- Released: June 12, 2017
- Genre: Alternative rock
- Length: 4:20
- Label: Entertainment One
- Songwriter: Chad I Ginsburg
- Producer: Chad I Ginsburg

CKY singles chronology
"Replaceable" (2017)	"Head for a Breakdown" (2017)

"Head for a Breakdown" is a song by American rock band CKY. Written and produced by the band's vocalist and guitarist Chad I Ginsburg, it is featured on the band's 2017 fifth studio album The Phoenix, and was released as the third single from the album on June 12, 2017.

== Composition and lyrics ==
According to the band's lead vocalist, guitarist and producer Chad I Ginsburg, "Head for a Breakdown" is a song "about taking things too far when you darn right know it won't end well but you do it anyway". Loudwire's Joe DiVita provided an overview of the song upon its release, outlining that "Unlike the two previous singles, "Head for a Breakdown" rests on the more somber side of the CKY sound, opening with some light acoustics, gradually working in a feature melody and thumping groove. Flush with hooks, the song boasts a powerful verse and highly-memorable, sing-song chorus that seesaws between singer/guitarist Chad I Ginsburg's soulful delivery and a melody-driven passage. Over the bridge, the track builds to a climax of sorts with the most aggressive moments coming in alongside the solo." Consequence of Sound's Ben Kaye claimed that "there's an undeniable melodic quality here that aligns the track more with stadium rock 'n roll than the band has ever been before".

== Release and reception ==
"Head for a Breakdown" was made available for online streaming as the third single from The Phoenix on June 12, 2017. Metal Injection's Greg Kennelty highlighted the song as the best of the three released prior to the album, describing it as "a spacey stoner ballad at its absolute finest". A music video for the track was released on October 16, 2017. Directed by Elena and Sofia Costa, it was filmed in London during the band's UK tour earlier in the year, which Ginsburg claimed was done as a "tribute and thank-you to the diehard Bloody Alliance and all the new fans and friends we made in the UK this time around".

== Personnel ==
- Chad I Ginsburg – vocals, guitars, synthesizers, production, mixing
- Matt Deis – bass, synthesizers
- Jess Margera – drums
