= The Company =

The Company may refer to:

== Organizations ==
- Central Intelligence Agency (CIA), an American spy agency
- Indian mafia, an organised body of criminals based in India
- Society of Jesus, aka the Jesuits, an order in the Roman Catholic Church
- The Company (Hawaiian organized crime), a crime syndicate active in Hawaii from the 1960s to 1990s
- British East India Company, active in early British trade and colonization in India

== Arts, entertainment, and media ==
=== Fictional entities ===
- The Company, a covert international organization in the American television series Heroes
- The Company (Prison Break), a covert international organization in the television series Prison Break
- The Company, a covert international organization in the television series The Equalizer
- Dr. Zeus Inc., also known as The Company, a fictional entity in series of science fiction novels by Kage Baker
- Zzyzx, a covert organization in the television series Kyle XY, which was often referred to as simply "The Company" throughout the first season
- Weyland-Yutani, often referred as "The Company", a fictional megacorporation in the Alien universe

=== Literature ===
- The Company (Ehrlichman novel), a 1976 novel by John Ehrlichman
- The Company (Littell novel), a 2002 novel by Robert Littell
- The Company, a time travel series of novels by Kage Baker

=== Music ===
- The Company (folk rock band), a short-lived American band
- The Company (vocal group), based in the Philippines

=== Production companies ===
- The Company, a U.S.-based TV and film production company co-founded by Charlie Ebersol

=== Other uses in arts, entertainment, and media ===
- The Company (film), a 2003 film by Robert Altman about the Joffrey Ballet of Chicago
- The Company (TV miniseries), a miniseries about the CIA based on Littell's 2002 novel

== See also ==
- The Company Band, an American heavy metal band
  - The Company Band (album), their self-titled debut album
- Company (disambiguation)
- La Compagnie, a French boutique airline
