= B-Sides & Rarities (CKY album) =

Compilation album by CKY
- Released: March 22, 2011
- Recorded: 1997–2010
- Genre: Alternative metal; alternative rock; stoner rock
- Length: 40:56
- Label: Distant; Mighty Loud
- Producer: Chad I Ginsburg

CKY chronology
Carver City (2009)	B-Sides & Rarities (2011)	B-Sides & Rarities Volume II (2011)

Singles from B-Sides & Rarities
- 1. "Afterworld" Released: April 5, 2011

B-Sides & Rarities is a compilation album by American rock band CKY. Produced by the band's guitarist Chad I Ginsburg, it was released by Distant Recordings and Mighty Loud on March 22, 2011. The album features a number of previously unreleased tracks, including live recordings and remixes, as well as songs from the 1999 album Volume 2. New song "Afterworld" was released as a single.

== Background ==
When announcing B-Sides & Rarities in February 2011, CKY drummer Jess Margera claimed that many of the album's songs were chosen based on fan requests. He specifically mentioned that "Shippensburg", the acoustic version of "To All of You," and the "heavy recording" of "Halfway House" had been in particularly high demand.

The collection is made up of recordings from various periods in CKY's history, from as early as 1997 (for example, "Shippensburg") to as late as 2010 (new track "Afterworld"), as well as a number of previously unreleased live and alternate recordings, such as acoustic versions of An Answer Can Be Found and Volume 1 closing songs "Don't Hold Your Breath" and "To All of You". The album features two versions of "Halfway House" and the previously unreleased song "Deepest Depths", which was originally recorded as a demo by Foreign Objects in 1995, by Oil in 1996, and by CKY in 1997, and features band member Matty J. on drums.

Guitarist and producer Chad I Ginsburg claimed upon release of the album that it was intended to act as a preview for a CKY box set, but as of June 2015 this has not yet been released.

== Promotion and release ==
B-Sides & Rarities was first released on March 22, 2011, and was supported by a tour of the United States comprising 13 shows between March 2 and 28. Music website Noisecreep shared the world premiere of the "To All of You" acoustic version on March 4; music magazine Alternative Press shared the world premiere of the "Don't Hold Your Breath" acoustic version on March 8.

On September 20, 2011, the album was reissued as a limited edition double vinyl, featuring more rare and previously unreleased tracks. The first 300 customers who pre-ordered the vinyl reissue also received a free copy of Live on West Chester University Radio 1999, a four-track extended play comprising tracks recorded live for Brandon DiCamillo's West Chester University radio show.

According to Miller, as of August 2015 the album has sold over 5,000 copies, making it the lowest-selling CKY album.

== Critical reception ==
Writing for the music website AllMusic, William Ruhlmann awarded B-Sides & Rarities three out of five stars, praising the album for its accurate reflection of the band's work, but criticizing it for featuring songs which had previously been released in another form. Music-News.com reviewer "Satanic Midget" gave the album the same rating, claiming that CKY's "version of the dreaded outtakes release ... is actually quite good", praising the "fun" nature of the collection but noting its lack of variation.

Of all the songs on B-Sides & Rarities, "Santa's Coming" received particular praise: Ruhlmann dubbed it the "oddest" inclusion on the album, describing it as "a tormented revision of "Santa Claus Is Coming to Town" that probably shouldn't be played within earshot of a child", while Music-News.com's review identified it as "especially fun". The latter review also highlighted the acoustic recordings, which were described as "the real standouts" on the album.

== Track listing ==
Original version
No.	Title	Original release	Length
1.	"Afterworld"	Jackass 3D (2010)	4:38
2.	"Rio Bravo" (radio session)	Previously unreleased	3:02
3.	"Shippensburg"	Volume 2 (1999)	3:18
4.	"Halfway House" (original version)	Previously unreleased	3:00
5.	"Chad's in Hi-Fi"	Volume 2 (1999)	3:19
6.	"Santa's Coming"	Volume 2 (1999)	3:40
7.	"Fat Fuck"	Volume 2 (1999)	2:11
8.	"Deepest Depths"	Previously unreleased	3:24
9.	"Rio Bravo" (remix)	Volume 2 (1999)	2:20
10.	"Don't Hold Your Breath" (acoustic)	Previously unreleased	3:39
11.	"Halfway House" (hidden track version)	Volume 1 (1999)	4:07
12.	"To All of You" (acoustic)	Previously unreleased	4:18
Total length:			40:56

Double vinyl reissue
No.	Title	Original release	Length
1.	"Afterworld"	Jackass 3D (2010)	4:38
2.	"Rio Bravo" (radio session)	Previously unreleased	3:02
3.	"Shippensburg"	Volume 2 (1999)	3:18
4.	"Halfway House" (original version)	Previously unreleased	3:00
5.	"To All of You" (acoustic)	Previously unreleased	4:18
6.	"Deepest Depths"	Previously unreleased	3:24
7.	"Santa's Coming"	Volume 2 (1999)	3:40
8.	"Chad's in Hi-Fi"	Volume 2 (1999)	3:19
9.	"Fat Fuck"	Volume 2 (1999)	2:11
10.	"Rio Bravo" (remix)	Volume 2 (1999)	2:20
11.	"Don't Hold Your Breath" (acoustic)	Previously unreleased	3:39
12.	"Tripled Manic State" (radio session)	Previously unreleased	3:30
13.	"3D" (instrumental)	Previously unreleased	2:21
14.	"Arto/Rowley Part" (instrumental)	Volume 2 (1999)	1:38
15.	"Step to CKY" (instrumental version)	Previously unreleased	1:39
16.	"Halfway House" (hidden track version)	Volume 1 (1999)	4:07
17.	"Era of an End" (acoustic)	"Afterworld" (2011)	2:42
18.	"3D Rocky Theme"	Previously unreleased	2:22
19.	"I Stole Your Love"	Previously unreleased	3:02
20.	"Inhuman Creation Station" (demo)	Previously unreleased	4:32
21.	"Sporadic Movement" (demo)	Previously unreleased	2:04
22.	"Sinking Fast" (Flesh Into Gear demo)	Previously unreleased	1:55
23.	"Close Yet Far" (acoustic)	Previously unreleased	3:57
Total length:			70:38

== Personnel ==
- Deron Miller – vocals, guitar, bass, synthesizers
- Chad I Ginsburg – guitar, bass, synthesizers, vocals, production, photography
- Jess Margera – drums
- Matty Janaitis – drums ("Deepest Depths"), photography
- Bam Margera – vocals ("Santa's Coming")
- Nick Lak – cover artwork
- Adam Ferguson – photography
