= Pros & Cons (album) =

EP by The Company Band
- Released: June 31, 2012
- Genre: Rock
- Length: 22:03
- Label: Weathermaker Music

The Company Band chronology
The Company Band (2009)	Pros & Cons (2012)

Pros & Cons is the second EP by American rock The Company Band. The band felt that they had 'hit their stride' with this EP with guitarist James Rota saying that it was if they had reached "that point in life when you finally say, 'I'm trading in the Kawasaki and going full Harley.' We went full Harley on this one." The album continues their exploration of the AC/DC sound.

== Track listing ==
All tracks are written by Neil Fallon, Jess Margera, Dave Bone, James Rota and Brad Davis.

No.	Title	Length
1.	"House of Capricorn"	4:43
2.	"Black Light Fever"	4:12
3.	"Kill Screen"	3:40
4.	"Loc-Nar"	4:29
5.	"El Dorado"	4:59
Total length:		22:03

== Personnel ==
- Neil Fallon – lead vocals
- James Rota – lead guitar, backing vocals
- Jess Margera – drums
- Dave Bone – guitar
- Brad Davis – bass
