= B-Sides & Rarities Volume II =

Compilation album by CKY
- Released: October 3, 2011
- Recorded: 1997–2010
- Genre: Alternative metal; alternative rock; stoner rock
- Length: 23:37
- Label: Distant
- Producer: Chad I Ginsburg

CKY chronology
| B-Sides & Rarities (2011) | B-Sides & Rarities Volume II (2011) | The Best of CKY (2015) |

Singles from B-Sides & Rarities Volume II
- 1. "3D" Released: August 17, 2011

B-Sides & Rarities Volume II is a compilation album by American rock band CKY. Produced by guitarist Chad I Ginsburg, it was released by Distant Recordings on October 3, 2011. The album features a number of previously unreleased tracks, including demo and acoustic recordings, and acts as the successor to B-Sides & Rarities, released earlier that year. The song "3D" was released as a single.

== Background ==
All eight tracks on B-Sides & Rarities Volume II were previously featured on the double vinyl reissue of B-Sides & Rarities, released in September 2011. "3D" was recorded for planned inclusion in the film Jackass 3D, but was ultimately omitted; it was released digitally on August 17, 2011. When the album was released on Bandcamp, it featured artwork bearing the name B-Sides & Rarities Bonus Tracks.

== Track listing ==
| No. | Title | Original release | Length |
|---|---|---|---|
| 1. | "Tripled Manic State" (radio session) | Previously unreleased | 3:30 |
| 2. | "I Stole Your Love" | Previously unreleased | 3:02 |
| 3. | "Arto/Rowley" (instrumental) | Volume 2 (1999) | 1:38 |
| 4. | "Inhuman Creation Station" (demo) | Previously unreleased | 4:32 |
| 5. | "Era of an End" (acoustic) | "Afterworld" (2011) | 2:42 |
| 6. | "3D" (instrumental) | Previously unreleased | 2:21 |
| 7. | "Sinking Fast" (Flesh into Gear demo) | Previously unreleased | 1:55 |
| 8. | "Close Yet Far" (acoustic) | Previously unreleased | 3:57 |

== Personnel ==
- Deron Miller – vocals, guitar, bass, synthesizers
- Chad I Ginsburg – guitar, bass, synthesizers, vocals, production
- Jess Margera – drums
