= Volume 2 (CKY album) =

- Original cover featuring Brandon DiCamillo (left) and Bam Margera

Compilation album by Camp Kill Yourself
- Released: February 27, 1999
- Recorded: 1996–1998 in Newtown, West Chester, Westtown and Downingtown, Pennsylvania
- Genre: Comedy rock; alternative metal; alternative rock; experimental rock
- Length: 74:21
- Label: Distant; Teil Martin
- Producer: Chad I Ginsburg; Jess Margera; John Teague; Dave Kurtz; Brandon DiCamillo

Camp Kill Yourself chronology
Volume 1 (1999)	Volume 2 (1999)	Infiltrate• Destroy• Rebuild (2002)

Alternate cover
- The cover used from 2002 onwards, featuring Rake Yohn

Volume 2 is a compilation album by American rock band CKY. It was released by Distant Recordings and Teil Martin International on February 27, 1999, the same day as the band's debut studio album Volume 1. The album features a number of early demo recordings, as well as skits and samples from the first CKY video, and recordings of prank calls performed by Brandon DiCamillo.

Often considered a soundtrack album for the first CKY video, Volume 2 was produced early in CKY's career, largely during sessions for Volume 1 and earlier demos. In contrast to other releases by the band, the album features a number of comedic tracks included in the CKY video, as well as various skits and other rough recordings. Multiple songs have been subsequently released in other forms.

== Background ==
Recording for Volume 2 took place between 1996 and 1998 in various locations: tracks were recorded by guitarist Chad Ginsburg on a 24-track tape and an ADAT in Newtown, Pennsylvania, drummer Jess Margera on a four-track tape in West Chester, Pennsylvania, John Teague on an ADAT in Westtown Township, Pennsylvania, and Dave Kurtz on an eight-track tape in Downingtown, Pennsylvania. Brandon DiCamillo's prank calls were recorded by DiCamillo and Margera in West Chester.

The songs on Volume 2 largely include rough demos of subsequently released songs, early recordings of songs later released by Foreign Objects (a band featuring CKY members Deron Miller and Margera), and alternate mixes and recordings of Volume 1 tracks. Volume 2 is the original album on which the song "Shippensburg" was released. Originally recorded in 1997 for Volume 1, but later removed as it "didn't fit well with the album", "Shippensburg" became one of the most popular songs among CKY fans, as noted by Jess Margera when revealing the news of 2011 compilation B-Sides & Rarities, on which the song also features.

Due to the majority of the album's contents featuring on the first CKY video, it is often considered as a soundtrack album for the film, and was described as such on the band's website. The video's two main stars, DiCamillo and Bam Margera, are featured on a number of songs including "Step to CKY", "Santa's Coming" and "Drunken Freestyle".

== Release ==
Volume 2 was originally released on February 27, 1999, in a limited run of 1,200 copies. It was later released on April 1, 2001, limited to 5,000 copies, and was finally released in unlimited runs starting July 1, 2002. In between the first and second pressings of the album, a limited edition of 100 copies was reportedly produced and distributed by drummer Jess Margera with a different track listing. A 5,000 copy-run of the album was released on picture disc on July 5, 2003.

Due to both the rough nature of many of the tracks on Volume 2, as well as the rarity of the album itself, a number of songs have been included on later releases: "Genesis 12a", "Santa's Coming", "Shippensburg", the "Rio Bravo" remix, "Foreign Objects #10" and the "Disengage the Simulator" demo were included on the 2000 extended play (EP) Disengage the Simulator. "Genesis 12a", "Testing", "Foreign Objects #10" and "Planetary" were later released on the 2004 Foreign Objects album Universal Culture Shock, under the titles of "Genesis 12/A", "Test It Out", "Universal Culture Shock" and "Planetary", respectively; and "Shippensburg" was also released on the compilation album B-Sides & Rarities in 2011.

According to Miller, as of August 2015 the album has sold over 6,500 copies, making it the second-lowest-selling CKY album ahead of B-Sides & Rarities.

== Track listing ==
Original release

No.	Title	Length
1.	"Foolin'"	1:02
2.	"Bon Jovi"	0:10
3.	"Football Trivia"	1:34
4.	"Shippensburg"	3:20
5.	"Fairman's Song"	3:20
6.	"Nothing You Can Do"	1:21
7.	"Chad's in Hi-Fi"	3:34
8.	"Kerry Getz"	0:17
9.	"Eye of the Tiger"	1:40
10.	"Step to CKY"	1:07
11.	"Drunken Freestyle"	1:31
12.	"My Music Bam Bam"	0:42
13.	"Victory"	2:57
14.	"Victory (War Scene)"	2:57
15.	"Foreign Objects #10"	2:06
16.	"Planetary"	3:02
17.	"Sucky Christmas"	1:23
18.	"Santa's Coming"	3:34
19.	"This Is Me Shittin'"	0:10
20.	"Center Starship"	1:37
21.	"I'm Gonna Fuck Your Day Up"	2:13
22.	"Ass Voice"	0:47
23.	"Dr. Murdock"	3:00
24.	"Auntie Freeze"	1:19
25.	"Open the Gate!"	1:13
26.	"Echo"	1:09
27.	"Softball"	3:11
28.	"GI Joe"	0:47
29.	"Cap'n Crunch"	0:30
30.	"Flooded Basement"	2:54
31.	"Dog Fence"	5:32
32.	"Kung Fu"	0:30
33.	"Teleprompt Message"	0:27
34.	"Jamie's Message"	0:20
35.	"Vacuum"	3:00
36.	"Indiana Jones Copies"	2:43
37.	"Mrs. McConnel"	2:41
38.	"Mythanksgiving"	0:27
39.	"Elissa's Favourite"	4:14
Total length:		74:21

1999 reissue

No.	Title	Length
1.	"Eagles Tickets"	2:46
2.	"Free Sex"	0:47
3.	Untitled	1:08
4.	"John Smith"	2:24
5.	"Burlin Cocks"	1:32
6.	"Male Strippers"	0:23
7.	"QVC"	3:12
8.	"I Want to Slip It in You"	0:10
9.	"Jello on My Naked Wife"	1:37
10.	"Chess King/Record Town Change Exchange"	2:06
11.	"Ben Chi"	2:02
12.	"I Need a Porno Pt. 1"	2:52
13.	"I Need a Porno Pt. 2"	2:44
14.	"Rambo"	0:28
15.	"Kung-Fu Classes"	1:35
16.	"Brandywine Fags"	0:54
17.	"Rent-a-Tent"	1:28
18.	"Harv's Auto"	1:51
19.	"Dunkin Donuts I"	1:42
20.	"Dunkin Donuts II"	1:01
21.	"Dunkin Donuts III"	2:33
22.	"Hans, It's Igor"	1:47
23.	"Shut Up for a Second"	2:01
24.	"I Got a Call from the 4th of July"	1:50
25.	"It's Good to Talk to You, Jing Chang"	4:49
26.	"Foolin/Bon Jovi"	1:24
27.	"Santa's Coming"	3:43
28.	"This Is Me Shitting"	0:09
29.	"Kerry Getz/Eye of the Tiger"	1:55
30.	"Ass Voice"	0:50
31.	"Shippensbam"	3:20
32.	"Mrs. McConnel"	2:06
33.	"Girl Fight/Drunken Freestyle"	2:35
34.	"Echo"	0:58
35.	"Theme from "Kick My Dad's Ass""	2:27
36.	"Teleprompt Message/Jamie's Message"	0:36
37.	"Vacuum"	2:58
38.	"Center Star Ship"	1:34
39.	"I Gonna Fuck Your Day Up"	1:55
40.	"Cap'n Crunch"	0:32
41.	"We Wish You a Shitty Christmas"	1:23
42.	"Lynyrd Skynyrd Ain't the Only One With a Sweet Home..."	0:12
Total length:		74:19

2001 – 2-CD reissue

Disc one (music)
No.	Title	Length
1.	"Santa's Coming"	3:43
2.	"Foolin'"	1:17
3.	"Bon Jovi"	0:10
4.	"Football Trivia: Who Was It?"	1:07
5.	"Shippensburg"	3:19
6.	"Intermission"	0:05
7.	"Football Trivia: A True Legend"	0:25
8.	"Rio Bravo" (remix)	2:24
9.	"Genesis 12a"	3:04
10.	"Fat Fuck"	2:12
11.	"Testing"	3:41
12.	"Chad's in Hi-Fi"	3:32
13.	"Kerry Getz"	0:17
14.	"Eye of the Tiger"	1:36
15.	"Step to CKY"	1:09
16.	"Drunken Freestyle"	1:31
17.	"Chinese Freestyle"	2:26
18.	"Jamie's Message"	0:16
19.	"Arto/Rowley Part"	1:36
20.	"Lynyrd Skynyrd"	0:12
21.	"Shitty Christmas"	1:22
22.	"Barbara Jeans Ass (A Christmas Song (Don't Ask...))"	1:52
23.	"The 12 Days of Christmas (Too Much Egg Nog)"	3:32
24.	"Whiter Trash"	0:55
25.	"Dropped"	2:30
26.	"Knee Deep" (demo)	3:41
27.	"This Is Me Shitting"	0:07
28.	"Foreign Objects #10"	4:12
29.	"Disengage Demo"	4:22
30.	"To All of You" (static mix)	4:51
31.	"The Human Drive/Ass Viking Convo."	11:01
Total length:		72:11

Disc two (prank calls)
No.	Title	Length
1.	"Ballsack"	1:22
2.	"Dog Fence"	5:31
3.	"Ass Voice"	0:49
4.	"Shut Up for a Second"	1:59
5.	"Hans"	1:48
6.	"Flooded Basement"	2:59
7.	"Rent-a-Tent"	1:26
8.	"Order"	0:29
9.	"Nooo!"	0:34
10.	"Photo"	0:50
11.	"Sloppy"	1:01
12.	"Steve's Dog"	0:57
13.	"QVC"	3:14
14.	"Shitbar"	1:01
15.	"Bonnie"	1:21
16.	"Star 69"	1:57
17.	"Open the Gate!"	1:59
18.	"Cocksucker..."	1:10
19.	"Centerstarship"	1:36
20.	"GI Joe"	0:47
21.	"Fingers"	0:16
22.	"Fe-Fi-Fo"	6:29
23.	"Cap'n Crunch"	0:32
24.	"Dunkin Donuts I"	1:45
25.	"Dunkin Donuts II"	1:03
26.	"Dunkin Donuts III"	2:33
27.	"Kung-Fu"	1:37
28.	"Echo"	0:58
29.	"Slip It in You"	0:11
30.	"Rambo"	0:30
31.	"Eagles Tickets"	2:46
32.	"Vacuum"	3:02
33.	"Celebrity"	12:07
34.	"Tung"	2:31
Total length:		68:49

2002 – 2-CD reissue

Disc one (music)
No.	Title	Length
16.	"I Want to Slip It in You"	0:08
17.	"Drunken Freestyle"	1:31
18.	"Bran's Chinese Freestyle"	2:36
19.	"Jamie's Message"	0:16
20.	"Arto/Rowley Part"	1:36
21.	"Lynyrd Skynyrd"	0:12
22.	"Shitty Xmas"	1:22
23.	"Barbara Jeans Ass (A Christmas Song [Don't Ask])"	1:52
24.	"12 Days of Xmas (Too Much Egg-Nog)"	3:32
25.	"Whiter Trash"	0:55
26.	"This Is Me Shitting!"	0:07
27.	"Foreign Objects #10"	4:12
28.	"Disengage" (demo)	4:22
29.	"To All of You" (static mix)	4:51
30.	"Rio Bravo" (demo)	2:57
31.	"Knee Deep" (demo)	3:41
32.	"Planetary"	2:59
33.	"In Hi-Fi" (the CKY documentary mix)	3:05
34.	"Bran's Rake Freestyle"	5:10
Total length:		72:57

Disc two (prank calls)
No.	Title	Length
1.	"Ballsack"	1:20
2.	"Strippers"	0:29
3.	"Two 20's & My Change"	1:06
4.	"Fuck Your Day Up"	1:55
5.	"Doctor Mirdock"	3:04
6.	"Dog Fence"	5:28
7.	"Ass Voice"	0:47
8.	"QVC"	3:13
9.	"Rambo"	0:28
10.	"Vacuum"	2:59
11.	"Chess King & Record Town"	2:08
12.	"Eagles Tickets"	2:43
13.	"Mrs. McConnell"	2:08
14.	"Free Sex"	0:47
15.	"Center Starship Survey"	1:36
16.	"Echo"	0:56
17.	"Dunkin Donuts I"	1:43
18.	"Dunkin Donuts II"	1:01
19.	"Dunkin Donuts III"	2:33
20.	"Kung-Fu"	1:37
21.	"Jello on My Naked Wife"	1:34
22.	"Nooo!"	0:32
23.	"Hans, It's Igor"	1:46
24.	"GI Joe"	0:45
25.	"Softball"	2:58
26.	"Rent-a-Tent"	1:26
27.	"Flooded Basement"	2:59
28.	"Indiana Jones Copies"	2:44
29.	"Shut Up for a Second"	1:59
30.	"You Ain't Rentin Shit"	2:45
31.	"Shitbars"	1:02
32.	"Ching, Don't You Remember Me?"	4:49
33.	"Grace"	8:38
Total length:		71:44

2003 – vinyl reissue

No.	Title	Length
1.	"Foolin"	1:15
2.	"Shippensburg"	3:14
3.	"Intermission"	0:06
4.	"Rio Bravo" (remix)	2:20
5.	"Bran's Freestyle"	2:23
6.	"Fat Fuck"	2:07
7.	"Testing"	3:35
8.	"Foreign Objects #10"	4:08
9.	"Santa's Coming"	3:36
10.	"Strippers"	0:29
11.	"Two 20's & My Change"	1:05
12.	"Fuck Your Day Up"	1:52
13.	"Dr. Mirdock"	3:00
14.	"Dog Fence"	5:20
15.	"Ass Voice"	0:46
16.	"QVC"	3:08
17.	"Rambo"	0:27
18.	"Centerstarship Survey"	1:33
19.	"Vacuum"	2:55
20.	"GI Joe"	0:45
21.	"Mrs. McConnell"	2:02
Total length:		46:08

== Personnel ==
- Deron Miller – guitar, bass, vocals ("Shippensbam", "Fairman's Song" and "Sucky Christmas")
- Chad I Ginsburg – guitar, vocals ("Chad's in Hi-Fi", "Fat Fuck"), programming ("Fat Fuck")
- Jess Margera – drums
- Bam Margera – vocals ("Foolin'", "Bon Jovi", "Shippensbam", "Kerry Getz", "Step to CKY", "My Music Bam Bam" and "Santa's Coming"), bass ("Drunken Freestyle"), photography (reissues)
- Brandon DiCamillo – vocals ("Eye of the Tiger", "Chinese Freestyle" and "Drunken Freestyle"), prank calls
- Ryan Gee – photography
- Rob Erickson – design and layout (original edition)
- Rake Yohn – design and layout (reissues)
- Adam Wallacavage – photography (reissues)
