= The Second Great Awakening (album) =

Studio album by Fireball Ministry
- Released: October 7, 2003
- Genre: Stoner rock
- Length: 42:58
- Label: Nuclear Blast Records

Fireball Ministry chronology
Où est la Rock? (1999)	The Second Great Awakening (2003)	Their Rock Is Not Our Rock (2005)

The Second Great Awakening is the second studio album by the stoner rock band Fireball Ministry, released in 2003 by Nuclear Blast Records.

Rock Hard gave an 8 out of 10 score, opining that "the band skillfully varies riffs with a stoner rock flair and extremely catchy melodies". Metal.de gave the same score, stating that the album contained "catchy hooks, infectious grooves, powerful chords, and memorable melodies" and only "minor lapses". Visions also gave an 8, albeit out of a possible 12, commending the "riff-heavy, and doom-laden stoner rock" and also "the comic-style artwork".

Powermetal.de also recommended the album and its "stoner anthems", preferably while driving a car on "Autobahn, ideally with at least an hour's drive planned". The instrumentation and production were both solid, and the singer "smooth, charismatic, and expressive".

The reviewer of Scream Magazine found a couple of good riffs, but for the most, the songs were "a little too anonymous" and the band therefore "not quite mature".

== Track listing ==
1. "The Second Great Awakening (Intro)" – 1:18
2. "King" – 4:32
3. "The Sinner" – 3:27
4. "Master of None" – 3:47
5. "Daughter of the Damned" – 4:19
6. "Flatline" – 3:31
7. "In the Mourning" – 4:00
8. "He Who Kills" – 3:53
9. "Rollin' On" – 3:51
10. "Choker" – 5:06
11. "Maidens of Venus" – 5:14
