= Doom, Gloom, Heartache & Whiskey =

Studio album by Viking Skull
- Released: 27 October 2008
- Recorded: 16 – 28 July 2008
- Studio: Dome Sound Studios (Royersford, Pennsylvania); Westtown Lake Studios (West Chester, Pennsylvania)
- Genre: Hard rock; heavy metal
- Length: 37:12
- Label: Powerage; Candlelight
- Producer: Richard Gavalis

Viking Skull chronology
Blackened Sunrise (2007)	Doom, Gloom, Heartache & Whiskey (2008)	Heavy Metal Thunder (2010)

Doom, Gloom, Heartache & Whiskey is the third studio album by English hard rock band Viking Skull. Recorded at producer Richard Gavalis's Dome Sound Studios in Royersford, Pennsylvania and drummer Jess Margera's Westtown Lake Studios in West Chester, Pennsylvania, it was released on 27 October 2008 by Powerage and Candlelight Records.

== Background ==
In May 2008, Viking Skull announced that they would be writing and recording the follow-up to 2007's Chapter Two, to be entitled Doom, Gloom, Heartache & Whiskey, in the US in the summer, with CKY guitarist Chad I Ginsburg in line to produce the album. Recording took place between 16 and 28 July at two studios in Pennsylvania: Dome Sound Studios in Royersford (the studio of producer Richard Gavalis) and Westtown Lake Studios in West Chester (the studio of drummer Jess Margera).

Doom, Gloom, Heartache & Whiskey was released in October in the UK and November in the US as the first album on Powerage Records, a new label co-founded by Classic Rock magazine, in conjunction with Candlelight Records in the US.

== Promotion ==
In promotion of Doom, Gloom, Heartache & Whiskey, Viking Skull completed a UK tour in December 2008 comprising 13 shows in 13 days. The band also supported Clutch on five shows in the US over the last five days of the year. For the tours, newly recruited guitarist Rich Vose was replaced by the returning Darren Smith, due to Vose "being missing and not being able to be contacted".

== Reception ==
Professional ratings
Review scores
Source	Rating
AllMusic	3.5/5 stars
Blabbermouth.net	7.5/10
Exclaim!	Unfavorable
Rock Sound	7/10

Media response to Doom, Gloom, Heartache & Whiskey was mixed to positive. Ned Raggett of AllMusic claimed that the album showcases "riffs that collapse skulls and hooks that roar with swagger", praising in particular the songs "Start a War", "Hair of the Dog" and "In for the Kill". Similarly, Blabbermouth.net's Scott Alisoglu described that the album features "boogie slams and hot-ass riffs with big, burly vocals", concluding that the style of music displayed on the release "never gets old". Rock Sound reviewer Darren Sadler praised the group for performing with "conviction and precision" on the album, which he claimed was "darker [and] more serious" than their previous releases.

Exclaim! writer Keith Carman, on the other hand, provided an unfavorable review of Doom, Gloom, Heartache & Whiskey. Describing the album's musical style as "groove metal-meets-Southern boogie", he condemned it as "a sick culmination of too many stoned nights listening to Black Sabbath, dreaming of being Dukes of Nothing and partying to ANTiSEEN".

== Track listing ==
All tracks are written by Viking Skull.

No.	Title	Length
1.	"Start a War"	3:14
2.	"Doom, Gloom, Heartache & Whiskey"	4:48
3.	"In Hell"	4:24
4.	"Hair of the Dog"	2:52
5.	"Shot Down"	4:08
6.	"Double or Quits"	3:16
7.	"In for the Kill"	2:59
8.	"19 Swords"	4:50
9.	"Drink"	6:40

== Personnel ==
- Roddy Stone – vocals, guitar
- Dom Wallace – guitar
- Rich Vose – guitar
- Kevin "Waldie" James – bass
- Jess Margera – drums
- Richard Gavalis – production, engineering, mixing, mastering
- Dave K – artwork, layout
- Rich Jones – artwork, layout
