= Antifragile (album) =

Studio album by All That Remains
- Released: January 31, 2025
- Recorded: 2024
- Genre: Metalcore
- Length: 43:19
- Label: All That Remains
- Producer: Josh Wilbur

All That Remains chronology
| Victim of the New Disease (2018) | Antifragile (2025) |

Singles from Antifragile
- 1. "Divine" Released: May 23, 2024; 2. "Let You Go" Released: June 14, 2024; 3. "No Tomorrow" Released: August 16, 2024; 4. "Forever Cold" Released: November 8, 2024

Antifragile is the tenth studio album by the American heavy metal band All That Remains. It was released on January 31, 2025, independently. It is their first album to not feature founding guitarist Oli Herbert, who died on October 17, 2018, and longtime drummer Jason Costa, who had been with the band since their 2008 album Overcome until his departure in 2023. It also is the first album to feature drummer Anthony Barone, the first with bassist Matt Deis since This Darkened Heart, and the only album to feature lead guitarist Jason Richardson.

== Background and release ==
The death of founding guitarist Oli Hebert in 2018 led lead singer Phil Labonte to question if the band could even continue without Oli. This forced the band into a new direction, resulting in an entirely new lineup with Jason Richardson becoming the lead guitarist, Matt Deis returning on bass, and Anthony Barone on drums. The band also parted ways with their record label, with Labonte emphasizing a desire to own their art outright and avoid being constrained by label expectations.”

Labonte stated “We spent a long time trying to figure out what All That Remains looks like without Oli," "It was weird, and it's probably why it took so long to get started. We remodeled our studio too. Except for what we'd written in my mom's basement, everything we'd made with Oli was done in that studio. The dynamic was different. Mike has written a whole lot more on this record. At the same time, Jason has his own style and sound, and it's filtered through what we do."

The album was produced by Josh Wilbur. During the time of the album being finished, Labonte had an interview with the host of 96.7 KCAL-FM program "Wired In the Empire". He said "We've got some music out, and there's a full-length record coming eventually. And I say eventually, just because I don't wanna give anybody any kind of heads up about when it will come out. 'Cause we're not gonna tell anyone. When it comes out, it's just gonna show up."

The first single from the album was "Divine". It was first posted to lead singer Phil Labonte's Instagram page. Released on May, 3, 2024 it was the band first new material in 6 years, it was accompanied with an official music video. The second single "Let You Go" was released on June, 14 and also had an official music video to coincide with its release. On August 16, a third single "No Tomorrow" was released and had a music video directed by Tom Flynn. The final single "Forever Cold" was released on November 8, along with a lyric video.

On December 6, 2024, the band released the announcement of the upcoming album along with the release date as a pre-order.

All That Remains did not hold any direct tour in support of the album, with the first tour since the album’s release not coming until April and May of 2026, in the US with Born Of Osiris and Dead Eyes serving as support.

== Musical style and lyrical themes ==
Speaking on the record's sound, Revolver described it as "a bona fide barnburner, evoking the defining sounds of the early Aughts Western Massachusetts metalcore scene that the band sprouted from, but with modern touches - from the technical guitar playing to the finely polished vocal hooks." Labonte stated that Jason Richardson’s knowledge of music theory had a profound impact on the album stating "We can hand him two riffs and be like, "Hey, what do you..." And he'll come up with six or seven different parts that we can use throughout the song and their variations or whatever."

The lyrics touch upon subjects such as propaganda, misinformation, empowerment, personal struggles and tribal behavior. Labonte stated “I wanted something that was actually a positive, uplifting concept,” “I think that's what Antifragile is — it's recognizing that the struggles that we go through in life are actually what make us stronger.”

Labonte wrote "Kerosene" right after the October 7th attacks in Israel and stated the song is "his outside interpretation of the fighting going on between the Palestinians and the Israelis." He added that the track "Divine" was him "trying to articulate a feeling that you get or that I get when everything's firing on all cylinders." Finally in that same interview he claimed "Cut Their Tongues Out" was an angry song.

== Reception ==
Professional ratings
Review scores
| Source | Rating |
|---|---|
| Cryptic Rock | 4/5 stars |
| Metal Master Kingdom | 7/10 stars |
| Rock.net | 5/10 stars |
| Metal Storm | 7/10 |
| The Mosh Network | Positive |

The album saw mixed to positive reception by critics, overall being seen as a good comeback for the band with all the line up changes they had faced. Alex Stojanovic writing for Metal Master Kingdom gave the album a positive review stating “While the album doesn't break any new ground, which I don't think the band had intentions of doing that with this record, it offers the best of what All That Remains became famous for in the first place. They made records where they strayed away from their traditional sound, but like all bands who branch off, they eventually find their way back to base, it just takes time, and that's what All That Remains did with Victim and now they continued that with Antifragile. Cryptic Rock wrote “Antifragile is full of well-constructed Heavy Metal that focuses more on what the songs need rather than constantly trying to wow you with brutality. Furthermore, Labonte sounds as inspired as ever, with a steady onslaught of singing and harsher vocals.

== Track listing ==
All tracks are written by Phil Labonte, Jason Richardson, Mike Martin, Matt Deis, Anthony Barone, and Josh Wilbur.

Antifragile track listing
| No. | Title | Length |
|---|---|---|
| 1. | "Divine" | 3:40 |
| 2. | "Kerosene" | 4:24 |
| 3. | "No Tomorrow" | 4:40 |
| 4. | "The Piper" | 4:23 |
| 5. | "Antifragile" | 4:31 |
| 6. | "Forever Cold" | 4:44 |
| 7. | "Poison It" | 3:52 |
| 8. | "Let You Go" | 3:52 |
| 9. | "Cut Their Tongues Out" | 3:22 |
| 10. | "Blood & Stone" | 5:54 |
| Total length: | | 43:19 |

== Personnel ==
Credits adapted from the album's liner notes.

=== All That Remains ===
- Matt Deis – bass, engineering
- Mike Martin – rhythm guitar
- Philip Labonte – vocals
- Jason Richardson – lead guitar, programming, synthesizers, engineering
- Anthony Barone – drums

=== Additional contributors ===
- Josh Wilbur – production, mixing, mastering, engineering
- Kyle McAulay – engineering assistance
- Jordan Ruddess – piano on "Blood & Stone"
- James "Jimmy T" Meslin – piano recording on "Blood & Stone"
- Anthony Lusk-Simone – artwork
- Daniel McBride – layout
- Matty Vogel – band photo

== Charts ==
Chart performance for Antifragile
| Chart (2025) | Peak position |
|---|---|
| UK Album Downloads (Official Charts) | 95 |
