= Remember the Story =

Studio album by Fireball Ministry
- Released: October 6, 2017
- Studios: Underbrow Studios, Burbank California
- Genre: Stoner metal
- Length: 49:28
- Label: Cleopatra

Fireball Ministry chronology
Fireball Ministry (2010)	Remember the Story (2017)

Professional ratings
Review scores
Source	Rating
Metal Injection	8/10
Coachella Valley Weekly	Favorable

Remember the Story is the fifth studio album by American metal band Fireball Ministry. It was released via Cleopatra Records in 2017.

The album has a vulture and two blown out candles on the front cover, contrasting to the back cover with a vulture in-flight and the candles re-lit. This is support the album's themes of death and renewal.

== Track listing ==
No.	Title	Length
1.	"End of Our Truth"	5:17
2.	"Everything You Wanted"	5:14
3.	"Back on Earth"	5:03
4.	"The Answer"	4:34
5.	"Dying to Win"	5:28
6.	"Stop Talking"	4:49
7.	"Weaver's Dawn"	2:48
8.	"Remember the Story"	5:13
9.	"All for Naught"	4:45
10.	"I Don't Believe a Word" (Motörhead cover)	6:17
Total length:		49:28

== Personnel ==
- Emily J. Burton - composer, guitar, background vocals
- Phil Campbell - composer
- Mikkey Dee - composer
- Lemmy Kilmister - composer
- John Oreshnick - composer, drums, gong, vocals
- Scott Reeder - bass, composer, vocals
- James A. Rota - composer, guitar, vocals

=== Production ===
- Paul Fig - engineer, mixing, producer
- Gene Grimaldi - mastering
- Caitlin Mattisson - artwork
- Andrew Stuart - photography
