= Behind Silence and Solitude =

Studio album by All That Remains
- Released: March 26, 2002
- Recorded: January–February 2000
- Studio: Planet Z, Hadley, Massachusetts
- Genre: Melodic death metal
- Length: 39:54
- Label: Prosthetic
- Producer: Zeuss; All That Remains

All That Remains chronology
Behind Silence and Solitude (2002)	This Darkened Heart (2004)

Alternative cover
- Re-issued album artwork

Behind Silence and Solitude is the debut studio album by the American heavy metal band All That Remains, recorded in early 2000 and released on March 26, 2002. It is the only All That Remains album with guitarist Chris Bartlett and bass guitarist Dan Egan. A re-issued, remastered version of the album, with all new artwork, was released on October 9, 2007. The artwork was designed by Killswitch Engage bass guitarist Mike D'Antonio. Being the band's first album, it is the only album not to include any singles or music videos.

== Background ==
All That Remains was formed in 1998 by then Shadows Fall vocalist Phil Labonte as a side project. After Labonte was asked to leave that band, All That Remains became a full-time project.

Before recording Behind Silence and Solitude, All That Remains recorded two demos, both released in 1999. The first demo features the songs "Follow", "From These Wounds" and "Shading" and was handed out at Milwaukee Metalfest 1999. The band's second demo, Demo 1999, features the same songs but with "Erase" replacing "From These Wounds". The demo version of "Follow" also features an orchestral intro.

Behind Silence and Solitude was recorded in early 2000, but was not released until two years later.

== Music ==
The style of the music in this album differs from their metalcore style that would be seen in their future albums. Instead it more prominently contains elements of melodic death metal. it is also void of any clean vocals and includes more harmonized/dual guitar riffs and melody progression.

AllMusic wrote on lyrics stating "the vocal style renders most of the words unintelligible, but a scan of the lyric sheet reveals not the usual quasi-satanic death metal stuff, but surprisingly heartfelt meditations on fate, longing, and lost dreams."

== Reception ==
Professional ratings
Review scores
Source	Rating
AllMusic	3/5 stars
Lollipop Magazine	Favorable
Rock Fest	7/10
Ultimate Guitar	8/10

Like most of the bands earlier work the album received positive reviews. Lollipop Magazine wrote “All That Remains turns out to be a side project gone straight and finally manages to see the light of day after numerous interruptions. In the end, they arrive at the right time as American fans clamor for a new power to do away with the gluttonous proportions of nü metal trends and tunelessness.”

== Track listing ==
All lyrics are written by Philip Labonte; all music is composed by All That Remains.

No.	Title	Length
1.	"Behind Silence and Solitude"	4:19
2.	"From These Wounds"	4:35
3.	"Follow"	4:02
4.	"Clarity"	5:37
5.	"Erase"	6:14
6.	"Shading"	3:51
7.	"Home to Me"	6:46
8.	"One Belief"	4:30
Total length:		39:54

== Personnel ==
All That Remains

- Philip Labonte – vocals
- Chris Bartlett – lead guitar
- Oli Herbert – rhythm guitar
- Dan Egan – bass guitar
- Michael Bartlett – drums

Additional

- Zeuss – producer
- All That Remains – producer
- Mike D'Antonio – artwork, design, photography
