= Chapter Two (Viking Skull album) =

Studio album by Viking Skull
- Released: 8 September 2007
- Recorded: November 2006 in Ardmore, Pennsylvania; Los Angeles, California; and West Chester, Pennsylvania
- Genre: Hard rock; heavy metal
- Length: 30:30
- Label: Filthy Note
- Producer: Viking Skull

Viking Skull chronology
Born in Hell (2005)	Chapter Two (2007)	Blackened Sunrise (2007)

Chapter Two is the second studio album by English hard rock band Viking Skull. Recorded in Pennsylvania and California, it was released on 8 September 2007 by Filthy Note in the UK and DRP Records in the US. The album is the band's first to feature guitarist Julian "Jules" Cooper and drummer Jess Margera, who replaced Darren Smith and Gordon Morrison, respectively, in 2006.

== Background ==
Following the release and promotion of the band's debut full-length studio album Born in Hell, Viking Skull's fate was brought into question when guitarist and drummer Darren Smith and Gordon Morrison left. By the end of 2006 both departed members had been replaced, with Julian "Jules" Cooper taking over guitar duties and Jess Margera of CKY fame joining on drums. Margera has claimed that he unwittingly contributed to the lineup changes, causing members to argue during a night of drinking on his tour bus.

Much of the recording for Chapter Two took place in Pennsylvania, Margera's home state, and was funded by the drummer. Margera's CKY bandmate, guitarist Chad I Ginsburg, engineered and mixed the album, alongside fellow engineers Phil Nicolo, Cody Cochowski and Tommy Joyner. Ginsburg and Unkle Matt and the ShitBirdz member Rich Vose performed additional guitars on "The Hidden Flame", while Fireball Ministry frontman Reverend James Rota performed additional vocals on the song.

== Promotion ==
In promotion of Chapter Two, Viking Skull completed a short UK tour in January 2008 comprising six shows in Glasgow, York, Birmingham, Leeds, Cardiff and London, with support provided by Year Long Disaster. The band also performed their first show in the US on 26 July 2008 at the Filthy Note Theatre in West Chester, Pennsylvania, Margera's hometown. Customers who purchased the album from CD Baby in 2007 also received a free copy of the band's second extended play (EP), Blackened Sunrise, as well as the music video for the song of the same name, which was directed by Bam Margera. "Blackened Sunrise" was also featured on Viva la Bands, Volume 2. In 2010, the album was reissued on vinyl featuring two extra tracks: "Skulls and Whiskey" and "Heavy Metal Thunder".

== Reception ==
Keith Bergman of Blabbermouth.net awarded Chapter Two a rating of 7.5 out of 10, a higher score than he awarded to Born in Hell (6.5 out of 10). Bergman praised several guitar riffs on the album (including "Blackened Sunrise" and "The Hidden Flame") as "flat-out fucking righteous" and claimed that Chapter Two was "a quantum leap over the band's debut, and ... a whole different beast". However, he did suggest that the album was "an odd mix of styles", and also called it "pretty basic and short".

== Track listing ==
All tracks are written by Viking Skull

No.	Title	Length
1.	"Blackened Sunrise"	4:14
2.	"Unholy Ground"	2:47
3.	"The Coming Plague"	4:13
4.	"Call the Lawyer"	0:24
5.	"Tails You Lose, Heads You're Dead"	3:47
6.	"Believer in a Dead World"	5:28
7.	"Call the Lawyer 2"	0:15
8.	"King of Kings"	3:08
9.	"The Hidden Flame"	6:14
Total length:		30:30

2010 LP reissue bonus tracks
No.	Title	Length
10.	"Skulls and Whiskey"	3:42
11.	"Heavy Metal Thunder"	3:37
Total length:		37:49

== Personnel ==
- Roddy Stone – vocals, guitar, production
- Julian "Jules" Cooper – guitar, production
- Kevin "Waldie" James – bass, production
- Jess Margera – drums, production
- Chad I Ginsburg – engineering, mixing, guitar (track 9)
- Reverend James Rota – vocals (track 9)
- Rich Vose – guitar (track 9)
- Phil Nicolo – engineering
- Cody Cochowski – engineering
- Tommy Joyner – engineering
- Andrew Alekel – recording
- Joel Metzler – recording assistance
- Roger Lian – editing
- Howie Weinberg – mastering
