= Their Rock Is Not Our Rock =

Studio album by Fireball Ministry
- Released: October 18, 2005
- Genres: Stoner metal, biker metal
- Length: 43:48
- Label: Liquor and Poker

Fireball Ministry chronology
The Second Great Awakening (2003)	Their Rock Is Not Our Rock (2005)	Fireball Ministry (2010)

Professional ratings
Review scores
Source	Rating
AllMusic	3.5/5 stars
Blabbermouth.net	5.5/10 stars
Noise.fi	3/5 stars
Scream Magazine	4/6 stars
Metal.de	5/10
Rock Hard	7.5/10
Heavymetal.dk	3/10

Their Rock Is Not Our Rock is the third studio album by American stoner metal band Fireball Ministry, released via Liquor and Poker Music in 2005. The album features the song "The Broken", which is recognized for its use in the video game WWE SmackDown! vs. Raw 2006.

It was later released by Century Media Records in 2006.

== Track listing ==
No.	Title	Length
1.	"It Flies Again"	5:02
2.	"Sundown"	4:27
3.	"The Broken"	4:45
4.	"In the End"	3:12
5.	"Hellspeak"	5:24
6.	"Two Tears"	3:09
7.	"Under the Thunder"	5:23
8.	"Spill the Demons"	4:38
9.	"Rising from the Deep"	4:10
10.	"Save the Saved"	3:38
Total length:		43:48
