= The Company Band =

American heavy metal band

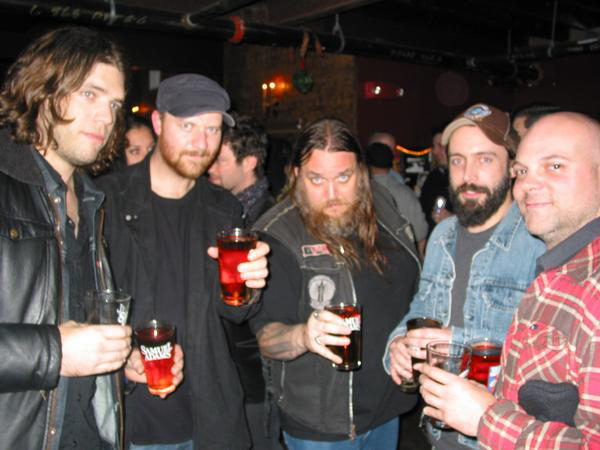
- The Company Band, left to right: Dave Bone, Jess Margera, James Rota, Neil Fallon and Brad Davis

Background information
- Origin: Los Angeles, California, U.S.
- Genres: Heavy metal; hard rock; stoner metal; alternative metal
- Years active: 2007–present
- Labels: Weathermaker; Venture Capitol
- Members: Neil Fallon; James A. Rota; Dave Bone; Brad Davis; Jess Margera
- Past members: Jason Diamond

The Company Band is an American heavy metal band. Formed in 2007, the band is a supergroup featuring vocalist Neil Fallon (of Clutch), guitarists James A. Rota (of Fireball Ministry) and Dave Bone, bassist Brad Davis (of Fu Manchu), and drummer Jess Margera (of CKY and Viking Skull). The group was formed by Margera, who enlisted the individual musicians. Initially featuring Jason Diamond of Puny Human on bass, the band released its debut extended play (EP) Sign Here, Here, and Here in 2008.

After Diamond was replaced by Davis, the group recorded its debut full-length studio album, The Company Band, which was released in 2009. After a few years of inactivity due to the members' other projects, The Company Band returned in 2012 with its second EP, Pros & Cons. Since then, there have been very few updates regarding the future of the band.

== History ==
=== 2007–2009: Formation and first releases ===
The Company Band was first announced in March 2007, when CKY and Viking Skull drummer Jess Margera informed MTV that he had formed an as-yet untitled supergroup with Clutch frontman Neil Fallon and Fireball Ministry guitarist James A. Rota. Margera noted that the band had its first rehearsal together in February 2007, offering the following explanation about his idea to form it:

I was on a flight back from Germany, and I was looking at my iPod, and I looked at my top 10 list or whatever, and it was just like Clutch, Puny Human, Fireball Ministry, Led Zeppelin. So I called everybody but Led Zeppelin, for obvious reasons, because I was recording in my home studio. I just invited them all up to my house, and we worked on two or three songs. That turned into five songs, then eight, 10, and now we have 12 songs.

The drummer later explained that he met Rota on tour, who suggested enlisting guitarist David Bone, at which point the three presented the idea to Fallon. The band – which was rounded out by bassist Jason Diamond of Puny Human – quickly recorded its debut extended play (EP) at Grandmaster Recorders in Hollywood, California with producer Andrew Alekel. The result, Sign Here, Here, and Here, was released in early 2008, initially as a digital download only and later on CD. It was later released on vinyl in 2009. On February 9, the band performed live on the 24-hour Jackass takeover special, held in Times Square, New York City.

In late 2008, Diamond was replaced by Fu Manchu bassist Brad Davis and the group began working on its debut full-length album. The album was recorded in 2009 in Los Angeles, again with Alekel producing, and was issued by Restricted Release in November; it was preceded by the release of a single for the track "It's a Confusing World".

=== 2012–present: Pros & Cons and future ===
In July 2012, The Company Band returned with its second EP, Pros & Cons, recorded again with Alekel at Grandmaster Recorders (Fallon's vocals were recorded with J. Robbins at Magpie Cage Studios in Baltimore, Maryland). According to Bone, the EP was influenced by bands such as AC/DC, Judas Priest and Iron Maiden.

== Band members ==
Current members

- Neil Fallon – vocals (2007–present)
- James A. Rota – guitar, vocals (2007–present)
- Dave Bone – guitar (2007–present)
- Brad Davis – bass (2008–present)
- Jess Margera – drums (2007–present)

Former members

- Jason Diamond – bass (2007–2008)

== Discography ==
Studio albums

- The Company Band (2009)

Extended plays

- Sign Here, Here and Here (2008)
- Pros & Cons (2012)
