= Chapter One (Viking Skull EP) =

EP by Viking Skull
- Released: 20 October 2003
- Recorded: 2003 at Premier Recording Studios (Corby, Northamptonshire)
- Genre: Hard rock; heavy metal
- Length: 25:48
- Label: Grand Union
- Producer: Iain Wetherell

Viking Skull chronology
Chapter One (2003)	Born in Hell (2005)

Chapter One is the debut extended play (EP) by English hard rock band Viking Skull. Recorded over the course of two days at Premier Recording Studios in the band's hometown Corby, it was released on 20 October 2003 by Grand Union Recordings. The EP reportedly sold over 10,000 copies in the UK, and was later included as part of the 2010 compilation album Heavy Metal Thunder.

== Background ==
Viking Skull were formed in 2002 by vocalist Roddy Stone, guitarists Frank Regan and Darren Smith, bassist Kevin "Waldie" James and drummer Gordon Morrison after a "drunken jam". Initially intended only to act as the opening band at Raging Speedhorn shows – the band of which Regan, Smith and Morrison were then members (Stone was their guitar technician and Waldie was their merchandising manager) – the group decided to record their own material due to the demand of their crowds.

Chapter One was recorded over the course of just two days at Corby's Premier Recording Studios and self-funded by the band with a budget of approximately £500. All guitars, bass and drums were recorded live, with Stone's vocals overdubbed separately. Upon its release by Grand Union Recordings, the EP received critical acclaim from Metal Hammer magazine, who awarded the release the publication's first 11 out of 10 rating. It reportedly sold over 10,000 copies in the UK.

In 2010, a remastered version of Chapter One was included as part of the compilation album Heavy Metal Thunder, alongside a remastered version of 2005 album Born in Hell and several previously unreleased songs.

== Track listing ==
All tracks are written by Viking Skull.

No.	Title	Length
1.	"Beers, Drugs and Bitches"	5:18
2.	"Wizard's Sleeve"	4:08
3.	"Frostbite"	4:07
4.	"Rape, Pillage and Burn"	3:44
5.	"Crazy Trucker"	4:38
6.	"Skull Heaven"	3:53

== Personnel ==
- Roddy Stone – vocals
- Frank Regan – guitar
- Darren Smith – guitar
- Kevin "Waldie" James – bass
- Gordon Morrison – drums
