= Kompany =

Kompany is a surname. It may refer to:

- François Kompany (born 1989), Belgian footballer of Congolese descent
- Pierre Kompany (born 1947), Belgian politician
- Vincent Kompany (born 1986), Belgian footballer of Congolese descent

It may also refer to:

- Kompany (musician), an American electronic dance music producer

== See also ==
- "Kompanie" (2018 song) rap song by Bonez MC and RAF Camora, from the album Palmen aus Plastik 2
- Electric Kompany, American band
- Love Insurance Kompany, a 2026 Indian film
- L-KO Kompany, an American motion picture company
- Company (disambiguation)
