= The Undiscovered Numbers & Colors =

EP by Foreign Objects
- Released: October 1, 1995
- Recorded: 1995 at Trix Trax Recording Studios (Malvern, Pennsylvania)
- Genre: Alternative metal; technical death metal; progressive metal
- Length: 13:58
- Label: Distant
- Producer: Deron Miller; Jess Margera

Foreign Objects chronology
The Undiscovered Numbers & Colors (1995)	Universal Culture Shock/Undiscovered Numbers & Colors (2004)

The Undiscovered Numbers & Colors is the debut extended play (EP) by American alternative metal band Foreign Objects. Recorded at Trix Trax Recording Studios in Malvern, Pennsylvania, it was released by Distant Recordings on October 1, 1995. The EP was the first release by band members Deron Miller and Jess Margera, who would later go on to form CKY. It was later remixed and remastered for the 2004 collection Universal Culture Shock/Undiscovered Numbers & Colors.

== Recording and production ==
Foreign Objects was formed in 1995 by Deron Miller and Jess Margera, who had originally met at East High School in West Chester, Pennsylvania in 1992. The duo recorded The Undiscovered Numbers & Colors at Trix Trax Recording Studios in Malvern, Pennsylvania with engineers Bob Zeigler and Matt Wacik. Production was credited to Miller and Margera.

Miller has stated that The Undiscovered Numbers & Colors was intended to be released as a full-length album, but due to Margera suffering a broken arm in a car accident they were unable to complete the recording to do so.

All guitars, bass, synthesizers and vocals were performed by Miller, while Margera played drums; songwriting was credited to Miller, with a co-writing credit also listed for Margera on the lyrics of "Destination Undefined". The artwork for the release was designed by Margera and Vinnie Zambuto.

== Promotion and release ==
The Undiscovered Numbers & Colors was originally released by Distant Recordings on October 1, 1995. The band (which included a live bassist) performed only two live shows in promotion of the release, before Miller and Margera began performing under the moniker Oil in 1996, which eventually led to the formation of CKY in 1998.

The five-track EP was later remixed and remastered by John Teague for the 2004 release Universal Culture Shock/Undiscovered Numbers & Colors, the first half of which was an album of new tracks recorded between October 2003 and spring 2004 (as well as some recorded in 1998).

== Track listing ==
All tracks are written by Deron Miller; additional credits noted.

No.	Title	Length
1.	"The Undiscovered Numbers & Colors"	3:02
2.	"Far Cry Behind"	2:32
3.	"The Other Side of the End of the Universe"	3:01
4.	"Delve"	1:09
5.	"Destination Undefined" (lyrics co-written by Jess Margera)	4:16

== Personnel ==
- Deron Miller – guitar, bass, synthesizers, vocals, production
- Jess Margera – drums, backing vocals, production, design, layout
- Bob Zeigler – production assistance, engineering
- Matt Wacik – engineering assistance
- Howie Weinberg – mastering
- Vinnie Zambuto – design, layout
