= Blackened Sunrise EP =

Blackened Sunrise

EP by Viking Skull
- Released: 8 September 2007
- Recorded: November 2006 in Ardmore, Pennsylvania; Los Angeles, California; and West Chester, Pennsylvania
- Genre: Heavy metal; stoner metal; hard rock
- Length: 17:59
- Label: Filthy Note
- Producer: Viking Skull

Viking Skull chronology
Chapter Two (2007)	Blackened Sunrise (2007)	Doom, Gloom, Heartache & Whiskey (2008)

Blackened Sunrise is the second extended play (EP) by English hard rock band Viking Skull. Recorded in Pennsylvania and California, it was released on 8 September 2007 by Filthy Note in the UK and DRP Records in the US.

== Background ==
The songs included on Blackened Sunrise were recorded during the sessions for Viking Skull's second studio album, Chapter Two, much of which took place in Philadelphia and were funded by drummer Jess Margera. Margera's CKY bandmate, guitarist Chad I Ginsburg, engineered and mixed the material, alongside fellow engineers Phil Nicolo, Cody Cochowski and Tommy Joyner. The EP was originally included for free within orders of Chapter Two placed through CD Baby in 2007. In addition to three songs not included on Chapter Two and an alternate mix of the title track, Blackened Sunrise also includes the music video for the title track, directed by Bam Margera.

== Track listing ==
All tracks are written by Viking Skull

No.	Title	Length
1.	"Blackened Sunrise" (J. Murphy mix)	4:22
2.	"Skulls n Whiskey"	3:29
3.	"Baby Let Me Know"	3:59
4.	"Heavy Metal Thunder"	6:09

- The music video for "Blackened Sunrise" is also included.

== Personnel ==
- Roddy Stone – vocals, guitar, production
- Julian "Jules" Cooper – guitar, production
- Kevin "Waldie" James – bass, production
- Jess Margera – drums, production
- Chad I Ginsburg – engineering, mixing
- Phil Nicolo – engineering
- Cody Cochowski – engineering
- Tommy Joyner – engineering
- Andrew Alekel – recording
- Joel Metzler – recording assistance
- Roger Lian – editing
- Howie Weinberg – mastering
