= Born in Hell =

Studio album by Viking Skull
- Released: 14 October 2005
- Recorded: 2005 at Premier Recording Studios (Corby, Northamptonshire)
- Genre: Hard rock; heavy metal
- Length: 37:49
- Label: Grand Union
- Producer: Iain Wetherell

Viking Skull chronology
Chapter One (2003)	Born in Hell (2005)	Chapter Two (2007)

Singles from Born in Hell
- 1. "Rock & Roll Suicide" Released: 2004

Born in Hell is the debut full-length studio album by English hard rock band Viking Skull. Recorded at Premier Recording Studios in the band's hometown Corby, it was released in the UK on 14 October 2005 by Grand Union Recordings. The US release followed the next year on 456 Entertainment, with whom the band signed in January 2006.

== Background ==
Born in Hell was recorded at Premier Recording Studios in Corby with producer Iain Wetherell and is the first Viking Skull release to feature vocalist Roddy Stone also performing guitar, following the 2004 departure of original guitarist Frank Regan. The album was released in the UK by Grand Union Recordings (on which the group had also released their 2003 debut EP Chapter One), and the following year in the United States by 456 Entertainment, with whom the band signed a deal with in January 2006.

== Promotion ==
In promotion of Born in Hell, Viking Skull completed a short UK tour in June 2006 comprising four shows in Manchester, Glasgow, Sheffield and London. This tour culminated in the band's appearance at the 2006 Download Festival. Prior to the release of Born in Hell, "Rock & Roll Suicide", backed with fellow album track "Inject My Woman (With Love)", was released as the only single from the album.

== Reception ==
Professional ratings
Review scores
Source	Rating
AllMusic	2.5/5 stars
Blabbermouth.net	6.5/10

Contrary to the critical acclaim of Chapter One, media response to Born in Hell was mixed. Greg Prato of AllMusic criticised the album for featuring lyrics which were predictable based on song titles such as "Crank the Volume", "Beers, Drugs and Bitches", "Dirty Dirty Hole" and "Inject My Woman (With Love)". Blabbermouth.net writer Keith Bergman also identified the release as one-dimensional, describing it as "a short, silly, fun slab of heavy metal cliché", although he did recognise "some moments of genuine drunken headbanging fun".

== Track listing ==
All tracks are written by Viking Skull.

No.	Title	Length
1.	"Born in Hell"	2:49
2.	"Crank the Volume"	3:55
3.	"Red Hot Woman"	3:18
4.	"Frostbite"	4:05
5.	"Saddle Up"	2:56
6.	"Seedealer"	2:45
7.	"Beers, Drugs and Bitches"	5:18
8.	"Rock and Roll Suicide"	2:56
9.	"Dirty Dirty Hole"	3:06
10.	"Inject My Woman (With Love)"	3:13
11.	"You Can't Kill Rock and Roll"	3:28

== Personnel ==
- Roddy Stone – vocals, guitar
- Darren Smith – guitar
- Kevin "Waldie" James – bass
- Gordon Morrison – drums
