= The Phoenix (CKY album) =

Studio album by CKY
- Released: June 16, 2017
- Recorded: June–August 2016
- Studio: Rancho De La Luna (Joshua Tree, California); Noisy Little Critter (Thorndale, Pennsylvania)
- Genre: Alternative metal; hard rock; alternative rock
- Length: 30:42
- Label: eOne
- Producer: Chad I Ginsburg

CKY chronology
Carver City (2009)	The Phoenix (2017)	Too Precious to Kill (2018)

Singles from The Phoenix
- 1. "Days of Self Destruction" Released: May 1, 2017; 2. "Replaceable" Released: June 2, 2017; 3. "Head for a Breakdown" Released: June 12, 2017

The Phoenix is the fifth studio album by American rock band CKY, released on June 16, 2017. It was the band's first album in eight years following Carver City (2009), marking the longest gap between two CKY albums. It is also the first album to feature guitarist Chad I Ginsburg providing lead vocals following the departure of Deron Miller, and the last album to feature bassist Matt Deis before his departure in 2019. Recorded primarily at Rancho De La Luna in Joshua Tree, California, it was produced by Ginsburg as the group's first album on Entertainment One Music.

Following Miller's departure in 2011, CKY performed a number of shows in 2012 with new frontman Daniel Davies. The new lineup recorded a number of tracks for a planned album, but other commitments saw Davies leave the group and Ginsburg take over as lead vocalist. Deis rejoined the band in 2015, before the new-look trio recorded The Phoenix in 2016. "Days of Self Destruction", "Replaceable" and "Head for a Breakdown" were issued as singles prior to the album. Clocking in at 30 minutes, The Phoenix is CKY's shortest album to date.

== Recording and production ==
Following the departure of original CKY frontman Deron Miller in 2011, the band began working on an album with his replacement Daniel Davies. However, due to other commitments (primarily a tour with John Carpenter) the material was scrapped and the band started again with guitarist Chad I Ginsburg on lead vocals. Speaking with Jackass crew member Rick Kosick in March 2017, CKY drummer Jess Margera noted that the band considered putting "one or two" of the songs written with Davies on the album, but then decided to start over after his departure. Referring to the tracks, Margera suggested that "Maybe one day we can revisit some of that stuff and give it a different name, because it was killer material in my opinion. Never say never." The drummer reflected on the situation positively, suggesting that it "couldn't have worked out any better, because it sort of forced Chad to step up to the vocal mic, which is where that guy needs to be".

It was first revealed that CKY was recording new material in January 2016, when Margera posted a photo of Abbey Road Studios in London, England, on his Instagram account with the caption "Me Chad and Matt Deis. Recording some new CKY next month. Abbey fucking Road. That is all." When asked by a fan in the comments about who would be performing lead vocals since Miller's departure, the drummer confirmed that Ginsburg would be taking over the role. No further updates were provided on the planned sessions, and in May it was announced that CKY would be recording at Rancho De La Luna in Joshua Tree, California, in July for a planned release before the end of the year. The announcement also confirmed that Ginsburg was the band's new lead vocalist. Ginsburg produced the album and later mixed it at Studio 4 Recording in Conshohocken, Pennsylvania, where previous album Carver City had been mixed in 2009 with Phil Nicolo.

== Composition and lyrics ==
CKY frontman Chad I Ginsburg describes The Phoenix as a stylistic follow-up to the band's 2002 second studio album Infiltrate•Destroy•Rebuild. Speaking to Canadian newspaper The Seeker, he claimed that the album "picks up where, Infiltrate•Destroy•Rebuild ... left off", hailing it as the band's "crowning achievement". In a feature for Alternative Press upon the release of the album's lead single "Days of Self Destruction", Ginsburg went as far as to suggest that fans could "ignore the other two records" after the 2002 release, 2005's An Answer Can Be Found and 2009's Carver City, dubbing The Phoenix the direct follow-up to Infiltrate•Destroy•Rebuild.

== Promotion and release ==
In March 2017, it was announced that CKY had signed a worldwide record deal with Entertainment One Music, with the band's first album on the label scheduled for a summer release. On April 30, 2017, on the BBC Radio 1 Rock Show with Daniel P. Carter, the album was officially announced and "Days of Self Destruction", featuring Brent Hinds of Mastodon, was premiered as the first single. The track was released as a digital download the following day, along with a music video filmed during the album's recording sessions at Rancho De La Luna. "Replaceable" was debuted as the second single from the album on the Loudwire website on June 2, 2017. Speaking about the track, Ginsburg described it as being "generally about anyone that gets in your way, holds you back or slows your potential with their own blatant insecurity, fears or sickness — individuals who you are ultimately and knowingly covering for as they selfishly sabotage you". Four days before the album's release, "Head for a Breakdown" was made available for streaming on the Consequence of Sound website. Ginsburg described the track as "a song about taking things too far when you darn right know it won't end well but you do it anyway".

== Critical reception ==
Professional ratings
Review scores
Source	Rating
AllMusic	3.5/5 stars
Alternative Press	3/5 stars
Blabbermouth.net	8.5/10
Gaffa	4/6
Metal Hammer	3/5 stars
New Noise Magazine	4.5/5 stars

Reviewing the album for Alternative Press, Aaron Burgess praised frontman Chad I Ginsburg's performance as lead vocalist on The Phoenix, noting that he "slides perfectly into the singer role, spitting venom through The Phoenix's 10 kiss-off anthems", and highlighted the track "Wiping Off the Dead". Burgess welcomed the return of "The inimitably fuzzed-out CKY guitar tone remains [and] the roller-disco grooves", but suggested that "the vibe feels more traditionally hard-rock than tradition-shattering", which he dubbed as "not quite CKY as usual". AllMusic's James Christopher Monger proposed that The Phoenix features "a sleek and sordid set of swaggering disco-post-grunge emissions that fall well within the established CKY sonic parameters", highlighting the tracks "Replaceable", "Unknown Enemy" and "Better Than Get Even". Blabbermouth.net's Ray Van Horn Jr. hailed the album as a progression from Carver City, praising it for "entertaining instead of challenging fans".

== Track listing ==
All tracks are written by Chad I Ginsburg.

No.	Title	Length
1.	"Replaceable"	3:10
2.	"Days of Self Destruction"	4:01
3.	"Unknown Enemy"	3:44
4.	"Head for a Breakdown"	4:20
5.	"The Other Ones"	3:15
6.	"Wiping Off the Dead"	3:59
7.	"Lies from You"	3:32
8.	"Better Than Get Even"	4:41
Total length:		30:42

== Personnel ==
CKY

- Chad I Ginsburg – vocals, guitars, keyboards, production, mixing
- Jess Margera – drums
- Matt Deis – bass, keyboards

Additional musicians

- Brent Hinds – additional guitars on "Days of Self Destruction"

Production

- Phil Nicolo – additional mix engineering
- Jon Russo – engineering
- Mike Bardzik – engineering

Artwork

- Adam Wallacavage – cover sculpture, photography
- Jimmy Hubbard – band photography
- Grey Haas – design, layout

== Chart positions ==
Chart (2017)	Peak position
US Current Albums (Billboard)	98
US Hard Rock Album Sales (Billboard)	9
US Independent Albums (Billboard)	19
US Rock Album Sales (Billboard)	37
