= Company (disambiguation) =

A company is a legal entity representing an association of people.

Company may also refer to:

== Organizations ==
- Company (military unit), military unit of 100–250 soldiers
- Opera company, an instituted company that performs operas
- Theatre company, of touring actors, singers and/or dancers

== Arts and media ==
=== Theatre ===
- Company (musical), a 1970 musical by Stephen Sondheim and George Furth

=== Literature ===
- Company (novella), a 1979 novella by Samuel Beckett
- Company (novel), a 2006 novel by Max Barry

=== Music ===
==== Groups ====
- Company (band), formed in 2001
- Company (free improvisation group), a jazz collective founded in 1968

==== Albums ====
- Company (original Broadway cast recording), 1970 album of the Sondheim/Furth musical
- Company (2006 Broadway revival cast recording), of the Sondheim/Furth musical
- Company (Bluejuice album) (2011)
- Company (Andy Burrows album) (2012)
- Company (The Drink album) (2014)

==== Songs ====
- "Company" (Broadway song), title song from the Sondheim/Furth musical
- "Company" (Justin Bieber song) (2015)
- "Company" (Tinashe song) (2016)
- "Company" (24kGoldn song) (2021)
- "Company", a song by Don Toliver from Heaven or Hell
- "Company", a song by Drake from If You're Reading This It's Too Late
- "Company", a song by Third Eye Blind from Out of the Vein
- Company, the subtitle of String Quartet No. 2 by Philip Glass
- "Company", a 2024 song by the Zutons from The Big Decider

=== Periodicals ===
- Company (British magazine) (1978–2014)
- Company (LGBT magazine), published in Hungary

=== Film ===
- Original Cast Album: Company, a 1970 documentary about the recording session for the Broadway cast album
- Company (2002 film), a Hindi crime drama directed by Ram Gopal Varma
- Company (2011 film), the Sondheim/Furth musical performed live at Lincoln Center

== See also ==
- La Compagnie, French airline
- "Kompanie", Bonez MC and RAF Camora's 2018 rap song, from the album Palmen aus Plastik 2
- Kompany (disambiguation)
- The Company (disambiguation)
