= Viking Skull =

British rock band

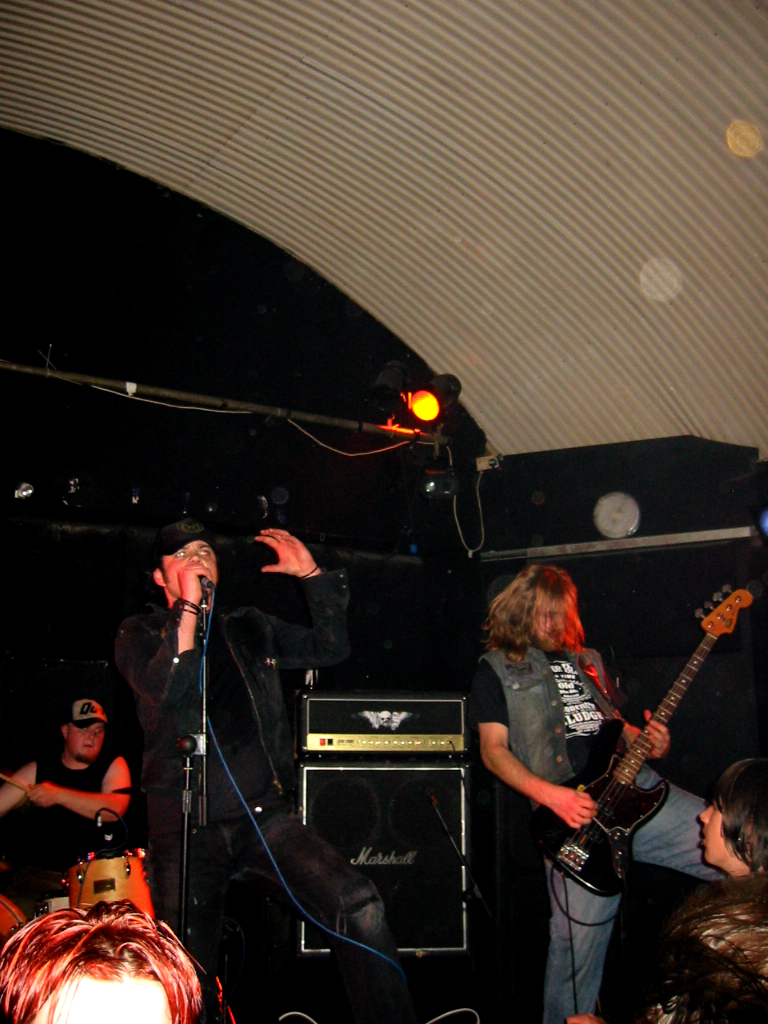
- Viking Skull performing in 2005

Background information
- Origin: Corby, England
- Genres: Heavy metal; stoner metal; hard rock
- Years active: 2002–present (hiatus 2012–2015)
- Labels: Transcend; Restricted Release; Powerage; Candlelight; DPR; Filthy Note; 456; Grand Union
- Members: Frank Regan; Dom Wallace; Az Hastings; Jess Margera; Larry Connolly
- Past members: Darren Smith; Julian "Jules" Cooper; Rich Vose; Gordon Morrison Kevin 'Waldie' James Roddy Stone

Viking Skull are an English heavy metal band originally from Corby, Northamptonshire, England. Formed in 2002, the band currently features vocalist and guitarist Frank Regan, guitarists Dom Wallace and Az Hastings, bassist Larry Connolly and drummer Gordon Morrison. Founded by Roddy Stone, Regan and Waldie with guitarist Darren Smith and drummer Gordon Morrison, the group were initially intended as a semi-comedic support band for Raging Speedhorn, which featured some of Viking Skull's members.

After releasing Chapter One and Born in Hell, Viking Skull came close to breaking up when Smith and Morrison left the band in 2006. Julian "Jules" Cooper and Jess Margera replaced the departed members and released Chapter Two in 2007. With Rich Vose replacing Cooper and the addition of Dom Wallace, Doom, Gloom, Heartache & Whiskey was released in 2008. Regan returned for 2012's Cursed by the Sword, and following a brief hiatus, their self-titled studio release Viking Skull was released in 2016.

== History ==
=== 2002–2006: Early years and releases ===
Viking Skull were formed in Corby, Northamptonshire in 2002 by Raging Speedhorn members Frank Regan, Darren Smith (both guitar) and Gordon Morrison (drums), along with their guitar technician Roddy Stone (vocals) and their merchandising manager Kevin "Waldie" James (bass). After playing at local shows for a number of months, the band recorded their debut extended play (EP) Chapter One over the course of two days with a budget of approximately £500, releasing the finished product in 2003 through Grand Union Recordings. Chapter One was received positively by critics, with Metal Hammer magazine awarding its first 11 out of 10 review to the EP.

In promotion of the EP, Viking Skull toured throughout 2004 in support of acts including Dio, HIM, Sum 41, Alice Cooper and Brides of Destruction, as well as performing at that year's Download Festival. In November, the group supported Murderdolls frontman Wednesday 13 on a tour of the UK. However, Regan left the band part way through the tour, forcing Stone to take on guitar duties in addition to vocals. In October 2005, the band were removed from a tour headlined by Alice Cooper and Twisted Sister, reportedly in order to increase the time given to the set of the latter. Twisted Sister's guitarist Jay Jay French later commented on the event, rejecting the group's claim that they were "thrown off" the tour and accusing the tour's management of misleading them. Later tour dates included support slots for Clutch and CKY.

The band released their first full-length studio album, Born in Hell, in November 2005. Contrary to Chapter One, however, the album received mixed reviews; a review by Blabbermouth.net, for instance, described Born in Hell as "a short, silly, fun slab of heavy metal cliché", while AllMusic's Greg Prato criticised its lyrics. The following January they were signed to 456 Entertainment, a record label co-founded by television and radio host Carson Daly. The label was used for the US release of Born in Hell later in the year, which also coincided with a short UK tour of four shows in June. The tour culminated in the band's appearance at Download Festival.

=== 2006–2015: Line-up changes and hiatus ===
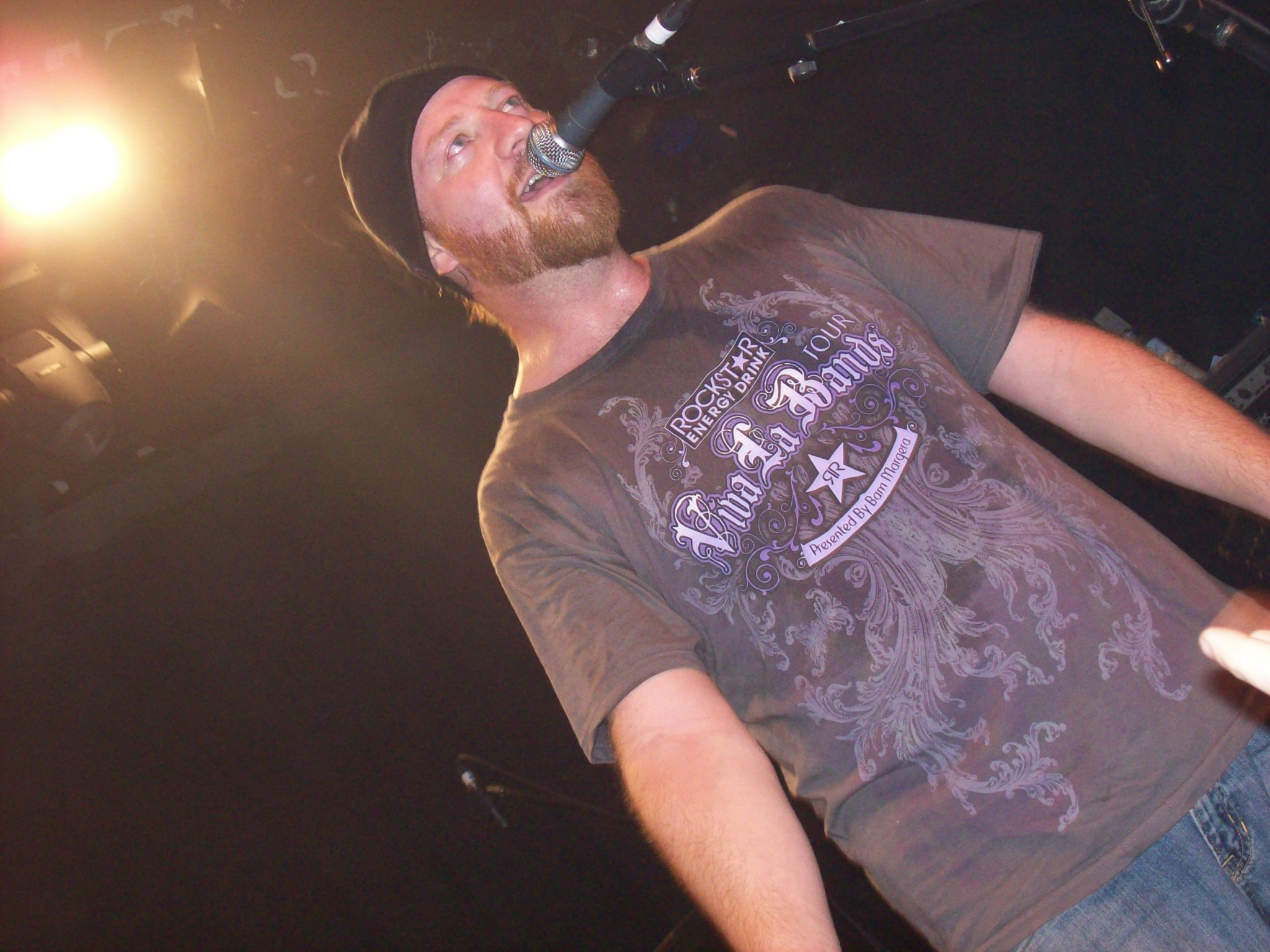
Jess Margera of American band CKY joined Viking Skull in November 2006, replacing departed original drummer Gordon Morrison.

In September 2006 it was announced that both Smith and Morrison had left the band, with Stone appealing for new members. By November, Julian "Jules" Cooper (formerly in Echobelly) and CKY drummer Jess Margera had replaced the departed members, with the new line-up beginning work on an album shortly after being finalised. Margera has claimed that he "unwittingly had something to do with" the near-breakup of the band, after encouraging the members to drink on his tour bus, which led to arguments and the departure of Morrison. Explaining that CKY took a lot of time between album releases so he "had plenty of time to do it", the drummer also noted that Morrison left to focus on Raging Speedhorn.

The recording of the new line-up's first album was funded by Margera and took place in Philadelphia. The result, Chapter Two, was released in September 2007 and featured guest appearances from Fireball Ministry's Reverend James Rota, Rich Vose of Gnarkill and Unkle Matt and the ShitBirdz, and CKY guitarist Chad I Ginsburg. "Blackened Sunrise" was also featured on Bam Margera's compilation album Viva la Bands, Volume 2, and a music video directed by Bam and recorded in West Chester was released for the song. A short promotional tour for the album took place in the UK in January 2008, with support from Year Long Disaster.

The band played their first show in the United States on 26 July 2008 at the Filthy Note Theatre in West Chester, Pennsylvania, Margera's hometown. At the time of the show's announcement, it was also reported that the group would be commencing work on their third album Doom, Gloom, Heartache & Whiskey whilst in the US, with Ginsburg leading its production. The album was released in November on Powerage Records, a new label co-founded by Classic Rock magazine. It was supported on a UK tour in December, as well as a stint supporting Clutch in the US before the end of the month. For the tour, newly recruited guitarist Vose was replaced by the returning Darren Smith, due to Vose "being missing and not being able to be contacted".

Original guitarist Frank Regan rejoined Viking Skull at the beginning of 2010 and the group set about work on their next album, which a posting on their MySpace page described as being "balls-out, meat-and-potatoes riffs (as always), but having the humour of Chapter One and Born in Hell". In October the compilation Heavy Metal Thunder was released, which included remastered versions of both Chapter One and Born in Hell, as well as a number of previously unreleased bonus tracks. The band's third studio album Cursed by the Sword followed in May 2012, released by Transcend Music. The group went on hiatus after the album's release.

=== 2015–present: Return and fourth album ===
In January 2015, the band started a Kickstarter project in order to fund a potential new studio album entitled Chapter III (later renamed Viking Skull), asking for £10,000 in donations from fans. The album was originally estimated for an October release date by frontman Stone, although this was later pushed back to early 2016. The band also completed a short tour of UK venues in February 2016. They have also been confirmed as one of the headlines for the Northants Rocks 2026 festival.

== Musical style ==
Viking Skull have been categorised as a heavy metal, hard rock and stoner metal band. They are said to be heavily influenced by Black Sabbath, with additional stylistic comparisons including AC/DC, Motörhead, The Who, Riot, Thin Lizzy, Kiss and W.A.S.P. In a review of Born in Hell for Blabbermouth.net, Keith Bergman described the group as "swaggering UK cock-rockers", while Greg Prato of AllMusic dubbed them as "down 'n' dirty biker rock". Drummer Jess Margera described the band's sound in a 2008 interview as "straight up beer drinking rock in the vein of Motörhead, [Iron] Maiden, [Black] Sabbath, and AC/DC", while the Crew Guardian noted that the band mix the musical styles of their influences with "whiskey drenched vocals" to create "an uncompromising brand of classic metal of their own."

== Band members ==
Current members

- Frank Regan – guitar (2002–2004, 2010–present)
- Gordon Morrison – drums (2002–2006, 2023-present)
- Dom Wallace – guitar (2008–present)
- Az Hastings – guitar (2023–present)
- Larry Connolly – bass (2023–present)

Former members

- Darren Smith – guitar (2002–2006, 2008)
- Roddy Stone – vocals (2002–2016)
- Kevin Waldie - bass (2002-2016)
- Jess Margera - drums (2006-2016)
- Julian "Jules" Cooper – guitar (2006–2008)
- Rich Vose – guitar (2008)

== Discography ==
Studio albums

Title	Album details
Born in Hell	Released: 14 October 2005; Label: Grand Union; Format: CD
Chapter Two	Released: 8 September 2007; Labels: DPR/Filthy Note; Formats: CD, DL
Doom, Gloom, Heartache & Whiskey	Released: 3 November 2008; Label: Powerage; Formats: CD, DL
Cursed by the Sword	Released: 28 May 2012; Label: Transcend; Formats: LP, DL
Viking Skull	Released: 2 February 2016; Label: none (self-released); Formats: LP, DL

Live albums

Title	Album details
Live at Voodoo Lounge	Released: 11 September 2015; Label: none (self-released); Format: DL

Compilation albums

Title	Album details
Heavy Metal Thunder	Released: 26 October 2010; Label: none (self-released); Formats: CD, DL

Extended plays

Title	Album details
Chapter One	Released: 20 October 2003; Label: Grand Union; Format: CD
Blackened Sunrise	Released: 8 September 2007; Labels: DPR/Filthy Note; Format: CD
