= Galactic Prey =

Studio album by Foreign Objects
- Released: October 18, 2015
- Recorded: 2014–2015
- Studio: Manifest Productions Studios (Lake Forest, California)
- Genre: Alternative metal; technical death metal; progressive metal
- Length: 43:33
- Label: Distant
- Producer: Deron Miller

Foreign Objects chronology
Universal Culture Shock (2004)	Galactic Prey (2015)

Galactic Prey is the second studio album by American alternative metal band Foreign Objects. Recorded at Manifest Productions Studios in Lake Forest, California, it was produced by the band's frontman Deron Miller and released by Distant Recordings on October 18, 2015. The album is the band's first to feature guitarist Kenneth Hunter, bassist Shaun Luera and Tim Luera, all of whom joined in 2014.

Initially conceived as a collaboration between Miller and Canadian songwriter and producer Jonathan Masi, Galactic Prey was later re-written from scratch by Miller and recorded with members of Orange County-based production company Manifest Productions, which includes Hunter. The album's production was funded by crowd-sourced investments on the website Indiegogo.

== Background ==
Deron Miller was originally inspired to produce another Foreign Objects album after being contacted by a Canadian songwriter and producer called Jon Masi, who was a fan of the group. Masi sent Miller a number of pieces of music, which the band's frontman said he "loved". The duo's idea was to collaborate on the writing and production of songs on the album, with Masi composing much of the music and Miller writing all of the lyrics. In an interview in August 2015, however, Miller stated that the material Masi produced for the album was not of a high enough quality for Galactic Prey, so he severed ties with him and rewrote the album himself. The music for the title track "Galactic Prey", written by Masi, remained.

After disregarding the material written with Masi, Miller entered the Manifest Productions studio and wrote the majority of the album during recording sessions. Speaking in an interview on The Sinner's Ball radio show in August 2015, he explained that he entered the studio with no material and began playing improvised guitar riffs to the accompaniment of a click track, upon which drummer Tim Luera added drum parts and the songs were subsequently built. Miller praised the recording process, claiming that he would be replicating it for future projects.

Miller launched a campaign on crowdfunding website Indiegogo to fund the production of Galactic Prey, with the aim of raising $13,000. In March 2014, the title track "Galactic Prey" was debuted on Miller's SoundCloud page. By July 2015 the album was said to have been completed, with Miller estimating an August release date.

== Track listing ==
All tracks are written by Deron Miller, except where noted.

No.	Title	Length
1.	"Way Before the Beginning" (music by Miller and Saman Ali)	2:08
2.	"Don't Ask"	5:00
3.	"Chip in the Brain"	4:26
4.	"Megadextria"	3:48
5.	"On Course to Collide"	3:24
6.	"Two Tickets to Heaven"	3:20
7.	"A Host to Suicitis"	3:15
8.	"Galactic Prey" (music by Jonathan Masi)	5:22
9.	"Sunset on Saturn"	3:56
10.	"Direct Contact with the Dead"	5:07
11.	"(With a Smile) The Friendliest of Fire"	3:59
Total length:		43:50

== Personnel ==
- Deron Miller – vocals, guitars, production
- Kenneth Hunter – lead guitar, recording, engineering, mixing, mastering
- Dave Sudock – lead guitar
- Shaun Luera – bass
- Tim Luera – drums
- Saman Ali – keyboards, orchestration, recording, engineering, mixing, mastering
- Kyle Salzman – recording, recording, engineering, mixing, mastering
- Jonathan Masi – guitars and bass ("Galactic Prey")
- Michael Barnard – artwork
- Phil Bowman – booklet design
- Sam Evans – additional layout
