= Sign Here, Here and Here =

EP by The Company Band
- Released: February 9, 2008
- Recorded: 2007
- Genre: Rock
- Length: 15:19
- Label: Venture Capital Recordings
- Producer: The Company Band

The Company Band chronology
Sign Here, Here and Here (2008)	The Company Band (2009)

Sign Here, Here and Here is an EP by American heavy metal band the Company Band, released in 2008.

This is the Company Band's debut recording, recorded at Bam Margera's personal studio The Hobbit Hole during 2007.

The CD was mixed by Andrew Alekel at Grandmaster Recorders in Hollywood.

== Track listing ==
All tracks are written by Neil Fallon, Jess Margera, Dave Bone, James Rota and Jason Diamond.

No.	Title	Length
1.	"Company Man"	3:56
2.	"Fortune's a Mistress"	3:22
3.	"Spellbinder"	4:13
4.	"Heartache & Misery"	4:28
Total length:		15:19

== Personnel ==
- Neil Fallon – lead vocals
- James Rota – lead guitar, backing vocals
- Jess Margera – drums
- Dave Bone – guitar
- Jason Diamond – bass
