= Fireball Ministry =

American stoner metal band

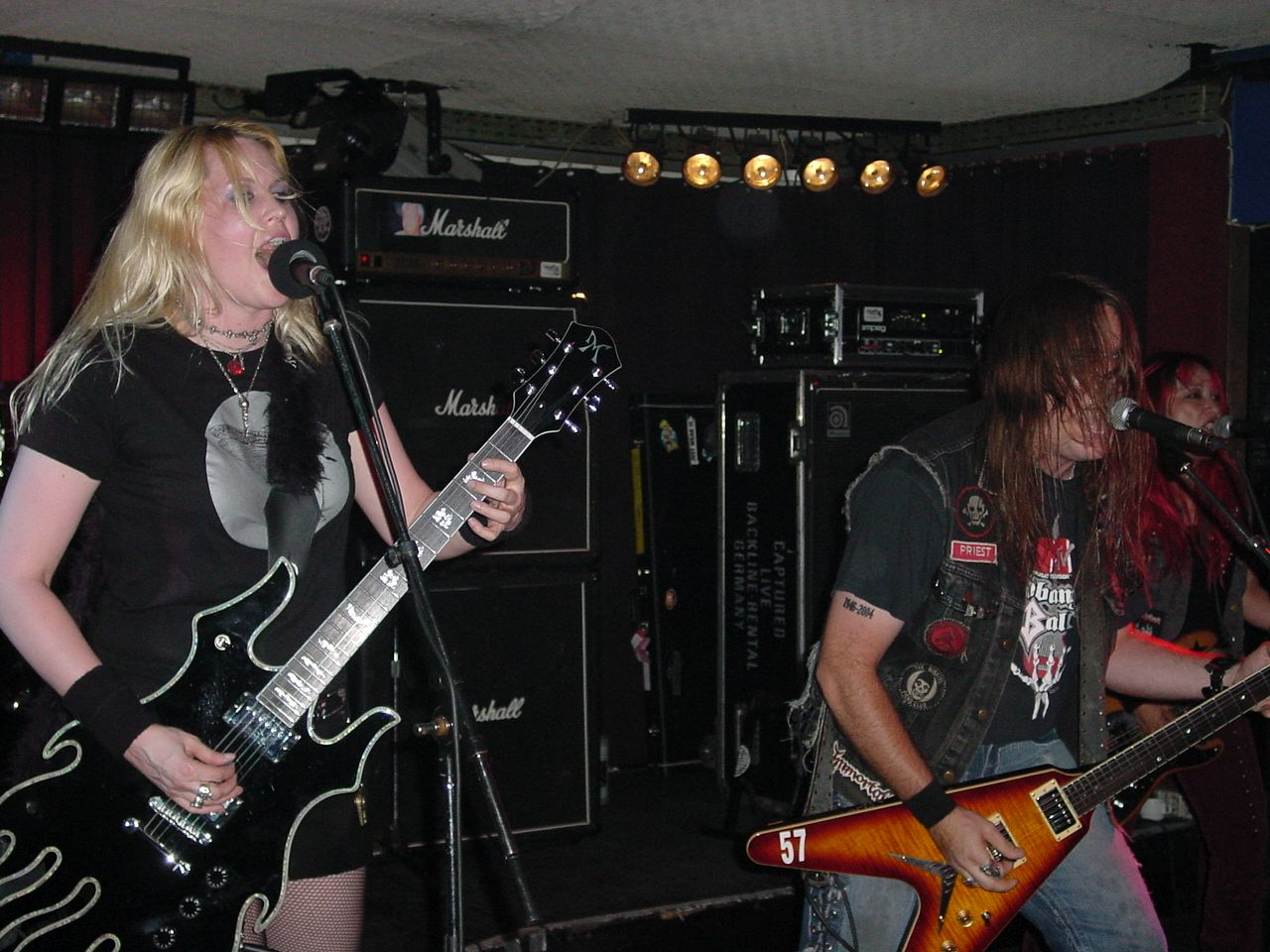
- Fireball Ministry in 2004. L–R: Guitarist Emily Burton, vocalist/guitarist James A. Rota II, and bassist Janis Tanaka

Background information
- Origin: Los Angeles, California, U.S.
- Genres: Stoner metal
- Years active: 1999–present
- Labels: Cleopatra; Bong Load; Restricted Release; Small Stone; Nuclear Blast; Liquor and Poker
- Members: James A. Rota II; Emily Burton; John Oreshnick; Scott Reeder
- Past members: Helen Storer; Janis Tanaka; Yael; Johny Chow
- Website: fireballministry.com

Fireball Ministry is an American stoner metal band from Los Angeles, California, formed in 1999.

== History ==
Formed in Cincinnati in the late 1990s by James A. Rota II and Emily Burton, Fireball Ministry relocated to New York City before eventually settling in Los Angeles. In 2000, the band performed at the two-day "November Dismember" metal music festival in San Bernardino, California, playing on the second day. The festival took place at the National Orange Show fairgrounds in two hangars.

After spending several years performing alongside prominent bands in the genre, such as Danzig, Anthrax, Motörhead, and Slayer, but without achieving significant album sales, the band refined their sound to broaden their audience. The tracks "King" and "Flatline" were featured in the big wave surfing documentary Billabong Odyssey (2003). Additionally, the track "King" was selected by Bam Margera for inclusion on his Viva La Bands compilation. The band collaborated with Margera's brother, Jess, when they toured Europe with CKY in 2004. The track "The Broken" was included in the wrestling video game WWE SmackDown! vs. Raw 2006 for the PlayStation 2.

The band experienced several changes in bass players, starting with Helen Storer, who played on Où est la Rock? (1999). She was replaced by Fu Manchu bassist Brad Davis for FMEP (2001), who was subsequently succeeded by former L7 bassist Janis Tanaka on The Second Great Awakening (2003). Former Systematic bassist Johny Chow then replaced Tanaka for the Their Rock Is Not Our Rock album (2005). This album was recorded at Dave Grohl's 606 West studio and, like the band's previous releases, was produced by Nick Raskulinecz.

With a connection facilitated by Bam Margera, the band supported CKY on their 2005 Adio Footwear-sponsored tour, following their role as the opening act during CKY's UK tour in 2004. In the fall of 2006, original drummer John Oreshnick took a leave of absence due to family matters and was replaced by Yael for the band's subsequent tour. Yael and Johny Chow were former bandmates in My Ruin. Yael departed in the winter of 2006, and Oreshnick returned to the band.

James A. Rota II considered becoming an ordained minister but was initially dissuaded due to potential legal and tax complications. Nevertheless, he eventually became ordained and officiated the wedding ceremonies of Matt Deis of CKY and Erica Beckmann in November 2005, as well as Bam Margera and Missy Rothstein in February 2007.

In an interview with Blabbermouth.net in May 2007, James Rota stated, "we [Fireball Ministry] are in the stages of writing a new album." In the same interview, Rota also referenced what would later become The Company Band EP, Sign Here, Here and Here. On June 14, 2008, Rota announced that three tracks had been recorded for the yet-unnamed fifth Fireball Ministry album. He was also working on a full-length album with The Company Band and a third, unspecified project. During this time, Johny Chow was touring as a bassist with Cavalera Conspiracy and Stone Sour.

Several tracks from the album Fireball Ministry, including "Kick Back," "End of Story," and "Fallen Believers," were featured on the soundtrack of the television series Sons of Anarchy.

The band also picked up bassist Scott Reeder of Kyuss fame in 2014, and he now serves as their current bassist as of writing

The band released their fifth album, Remember the Story, on October 6, 2017, through Cleopatra Records.

== Inspiration ==
The band's imagery is heavily influenced by Christianity, reflected in their name, "ministry," as well as album titles such as The Second Great Awakening and Their Rock Is Not Our Rock, the latter referencing Deuteronomy 32:31. MTV.com described the band's music as possessing "a musical chemistry between the members... that makes their songs buzz with warmth."

The name "Fireball Ministry" was derived from a public-access TV show in Cincinnati that used the same name.

== Discography ==
=== Studio albums ===
- Où est la Rock? (1999)
- The Second Great Awakening (2003)
- Their Rock Is Not Our Rock (2005)
- Fireball Ministry (2010)
- Remember the Story (2017)

=== EPs ===
- FMEP (2001)

== Members ==
=== Current ===
- James A. Rota II – guitars, vocals (1999–present)
- Emily Burton – guitars (1999–present)
- John Oreshnick – drums (1999–present)
- Scott Reeder – bass (2014–present)

=== Former ===
- Helen Storer – bass (1999–2001), touring (2018)
- Brad Davis – bass (2001–2002)
- Janis Tanaka – bass (2002–2004)
- Johny Chow – bass (2004–2014)
- Yael – drums (2006)
- Brad Prescott – mandolin (2016)
