= Universal Culture Shock/Undiscovered Numbers & Colors =

Studio album by Foreign Objects
- Released: October 31, 2004
- Recorded: Universal Culture Shock; 1998 and October 2003–Spring 2004 at John Teague's Studio (West Chester, Pennsylvania); Undiscovered Numbers & Colors; 1995 at Trix Trax Recording Studios (Malvern, Pennsylvania)
- Genre: Alternative metal; technical death metal; progressive metal
- Length: 64:34
- Label: Distant
- Producer: Deron Miller; James Murphy; John Teague; Jess Margera

Foreign Objects chronology
The Undiscovered Numbers & Colors (1995)	Universal Culture Shock/Undiscovered Numbers & Colors (2004)	Galactic Prey (2015)

Singles from Universal Culture Shock/Undiscovered Numbers & Colors
- 1. "Test It Out" Released: April 17, 2009

Universal Culture Shock/Undiscovered Numbers & Colors is the debut full-length studio album by American alternative metal band Foreign Objects. Recorded in West Chester, Pennsylvania, it was released by Distant Recordings on October 31, 2004. The collection includes new album Universal Culture Shock and 1995 extended play (EP) The Undiscovered Numbers & Colors.

Band members Deron Miller and Jess Margera recorded Universal Culture Shock with guitarist James Murphy and producer John Teague between 2003 and 2004. Teague also remixed and remastered the band's debut EP, which made up the second half of the release. The collection was later included as part of the 2009 Distant box set Distant Recordings 15 Years, and "Test It Out" was released as a single.

== Recording and production ==
The Undiscovered Numbers & Colors was originally recorded in the summer of 1995 at Trix Trax Recording Studios in Malvern, Pennsylvania, and released by Distant Recordings on October 1, 1995. For its 2004 release, it was remixed and remastered.

Universal Culture Shock was recorded between October 2003 and the spring of 2004 at co-producer John Teague's studio in West Chester, Pennsylvania; some recordings originate from 1998 sessions. In addition to the core lineup of Deron Miller and Jess Margera, former Death guitarist James Murphy (with whom Miller was then working on Death tribute album Within the Mind: In Homage to the Musical Legacy of Chuck Schuldiner) played lead guitar on the album. Miller praised Murphy's contributions, claiming they made the album "a thousand times better".

All compositions are credited as being written by Miller, with the exception of closing track "Big Boy", a cover version of a song originally recorded by the band Sparks. The album was produced and engineered by Miller, Murphy and Teague; Murphy and Teague also mixed the album, and Murphy handled mastering. Miller performed guitar, bass and vocals on the album, as well as lead guitar on "Planetary" and "Big Boy" and co-lead guitar on "Cosmic Consciousness" and "They Come in Peace".

== Promotion and release ==
Universal Culture Shock/Undiscovered Numbers & Colors was released by Distant Recordings on October 31, 2004; it was initially limited to a run of 2,000 copies, and was distributed exclusively through online retailer Amazon.com. The full collection was later included on the 2009 Distant box set Distant Recordings 15 Years, alongside CKY's Disengage the Simulator and Reverb on the Click by Rudy & Blitz. The Undiscovered Numbers & Colors disc features a video of one of the band's two live performances, at the West Chester Henderson High School Auditorium in 1996. The box set was also preceded by the release of "Test It Out" as a single on April 17, 2009.

On November 15, 2013, World of Rock Records issued a limited edition 7" vinyl version of "Test It Out", backed with an acoustic version of "Victory Over Neptune". The single release, limited to 250 copies, was the first in a planned series to include all ten of the original songs from Universal Culture Shock, which would have been followed by a collector's box to hold all of the records. The "Genesis 12/A" release followed in 2014, backed with the 1996 demo of the track. However, before the label could continue with the series, in November 2014 it was announced that it would be closing business.

== Track listing ==
All tracks are written by Deron Miller, except where noted.

Disc one: Universal Culture Shock
No.	Title	Length
1.	"Test It Out"	3:40
2.	"Universal Culture Shock"	4:04
3.	"Genesis 12/A"	2:56
4.	"They Come in Peace"	3:59
5.	"Chemical Control"	3:02
6.	"Puzzled"	2:30
7.	"Disengage the Simulator"	4:06
8.	"Cosmic Consciousness"	3:56
9.	"Planetary"	2:54
10.	"Victory Over Neptune"	4:31
11.	"Big Boy" (Sparks cover, written by Ron Mael)	3:16
Total length:		38:49

Disc two: Undiscovered Numbers & Colors
No.	Title	Length
1.	"The Undiscovered Numbers & Colors"	3:02
2.	"Far Cry Behind"	2:32
3.	"The Other Side of the End of the Universe"	3:01
4.	"Delve"	1:09
5.	"Destination Undefined" (lyrics co-written by Jess Margera)	4:16
6.	"1996 Henderson Auditorium Show" (video)	11:43
Total length:		25:41

== Personnel ==
- Deron Miller – guitars, bass, vocals, synthesizers (Undiscovered Numbers & Colors only), production, engineering (Universal Culture Shock only)
- Jess Margera – drums, backing vocals (Undiscovered Numbers & Colors only), production (Undiscovered Numbers & Colors only), design, layout
- James Murphy – lead guitars, production, engineering, mixing, mastering (all Universal Culture Shock only)
- John Teague – production, engineering, mixing (all Universal Culture Shock only)
- Bob Zeigler – production assistance, engineering (both Undiscovered Numbers & Colors only)
- Matt Wacik – engineering assistance (Undiscovered Numbers & Colors only)
- Howie Weinberg – mastering (Undiscovered Numbers & Colors only)
- Vinnie Zambuto – design, layout
