= Où est la Rock? =

Studio album by Fireball Ministry
- Released: August 16, 1999
- Recorded: February 1999
- Genre: Hard rock, alternative rock
- Length: 32:32
- Label: Bong Load Records
- Producer: Doug Boehm

Fireball Ministry chronology
Où est la Rock? (1999)	FMEP (2001)

Professional ratings
Review scores
Source	Rating
AllMusic	3/5 stars
Chronicles of Chaos	7.5/10

Où est la Rock? (French for "Where Is the Rock?") is the first studio album by the American heavy metal band Fireball Ministry. It was released in 1999 on the independent Bong Load Records. Nick Menza contributed to the album.

== Critical reception ==
LA Weekly wrote: "The Fireball Ministry sound is dry, heavy and stripped-down, brutal enough to match modern metal mutants like Queens of the Stone Age and Machine Head, but sufficiently song oriented to click with anyone enamored of Black Sabbath, Iron Maiden or any other classic hard-rock band you’d care to name."

== Track listing ==
No.	Title	Length
1.	"The Man"	2:30
2.	"Two Tears"	3:21
3.	"665"	4:40
4.	"3"	2:52
5.	"Guts"	3:51
6.	"Death Dealer"	4:10
7.	"VIM"	6:37
8.	"Levites"	4:27
