= The Company Band (album) =

Studio album by The Company Band
- Released: November 10, 2009
- Recorded: Early 2009 at Grandmaster Recorders in Hollywood
- Genre: Rock
- Length: 37:49
- Label: Restricted Release
- Producer: Andrew Alekel

The Company Band chronology
Sign Here, Here and Here (2008)	The Company Band (2009)	Pros & Cons (2012)

Professional ratings
Review scores
Source	Rating
AllMusic	4/5 stars

The Company Band is the debut studio album by American rock band the Company Band.

== Track listing ==
All tracks are written by Neil Fallon, Jess Margera, Dave Bone, James Rota and Brad Davis

No.	Title	Length
1.	"Zombie Barricades"	3:40
2.	"It's a Confusing World"	3:29
3.	"Djinn and Pentatonic"	4:02
4.	"Inline Six"	3:27
5.	"Hot Topic Woman"	3:32
6.	"All's Well in Milton Keynes"	4:53
7.	"Who Else but Us?"	3:33
8.	"CD&W"	3:16
9.	"Love Means Never Having to Say You're Ugly"	3:55
10.	"Lethe Waters"	4:10
Total length:		37:49

== Personnel ==
- Neil Fallon – lead vocals
- James Rota – lead guitar, backing vocals
- Jess Margera – drums
- Dave Bone – guitar
- Brad Davis – bass
