= This Darkened Heart =

Studio album by All That Remains
- Released: March 23, 2004
- Recorded: October 1–22, 2003
- Studio: Zing Studios in Westfield, MA
- Genre: Metalcore; melodic death metal
- Length: 41:33
- Label: Prosthetic
- Producer: Adam Dutkiewicz

All That Remains chronology
| Behind Silence and Solitude (2002) | This Darkened Heart (2004) | The Fall of Ideals (2006) |

Singles from This Darkened Heart
- 1. "This Darkened Heart" Released: March 6, 2004; 2. "Tattered on My Sleeve" Released: October 31, 2004; 3. "The Deepest Gray" Released: February 20, 2005

Professional ratings
Review scores
| Source | Rating |
|---|---|
| AllMusic | 3/5 stars |
| Exclaim! | Positive |
| Punk News | 4.5/5 stars |
| WKNC-FM | 10/10 stars |
| Ultimate Guitar | 10/10 stars |
| Metal.de | 8/10 |

This Darkened Heart is the second studio album by the American heavy metal band All That Remains, released on March 23, 2004. It includes the singles "This Darkened Heart", "Tattered on My Sleeve" and "The Deepest Gray", all three of which had music videos created for them. The album was produced by Killswitch Engage guitarist Adam Dutkiewicz.

This Darkened Heart is the first All That Remains album to feature current rhythm guitarist Mike Martin, the last album to feature drummer Michael Bartlett, and the first album to feature bassist Matt Deis who left the band in 2005 and then rejoined in 2022.

== Musical style ==
This Darkened Heart marks a shift in the band's sound, moving away from the melodic death metal sound of Behind Silence and Solitude to more of a metalcore sound. Additionally, some of the songs feature clean vocals. It is also known for its intricate guitar solos, precise drumming, brutal/heavy screams and tight rhythm work — a step up in technical proficiency from their debut. Producer Adam Dutkiewicz helped shape the crisp, modern metalcore sound.

The lyrical themes touch upon inner conflict, emotional struggle, perseverance along with isolation and the light of friends and loved ones.

== Reception ==
The album is considered a metalcore classic and has received critical acclaim. Bryan writing for Punk News gave the album a nearly perfect score crediting “The lead guitar work is awesome and the rhythm guitar is slick as well.” He also praised the vocal work but stated they “are stale in comparison to what the true magic of All That Remains has: The solos. Herbert and Martin rip through around eight solos on the album including double solos on several tracks.” Old Guard writing for last rites stated “There’s the presence of strong dual guitar harmonies – an obvious nod to Iron Maiden, along with some choppy melodic thrash parts. With quite an abundance of well placed solos with even some sweeping arpeggios, All That Remains manages to combine even the craftiest of guitarwork with, at times, straight hardcore riffing. The Saw writing for WKNC-FM gave the album a perfect score stating “This Darkened Heart is a perfect example of very early “Death Core;” though, the music (and its composition) is very much Heavy Metal, leaning toward Death Metal. Today, this combination of styles would be considered a band’s way of breaking out of the various “Core” genres. But in 2004, this is the expression of a band forging an entirely new brand of Metal. German reviewer Metal.de wrote "This Darkened Heart" runs on multiple musical tracks—Hardcore, Metal, Thrash, Melodic Death, and classical acoustic guitar—making the album a varied and thoroughly enjoyable listening experience. It unleashes heavy riffs and drives a rhythm that grips you like the stranglehold of a python."

== Track listing ==
All lyrics are written by Philip Labonte; all music is composed by All That Remains.

| No. | Title | Length |
|---|---|---|
| 1. | "And Death in My Arms" | 4:45 |
| 2. | "The Deepest Gray" | 3:09 |
| 3. | "Vicious Betrayal" | 4:19 |
| 4. | "I Die in Degrees" | 3:30 |
| 5. | "Focus Shall Not Fail" | 6:18 |
| 6. | "Regret Not" (instrumental) | 4:26 |
| 7. | "Passion" | 3:42 |
| 8. | "For Salvation" | 3:50 |
| 9. | "Tattered on My Sleeve" | 4:21 |
| 10. | "This Darkened Heart" | 3:13 |
| Total length: | | 41:33 |

== Personnel ==
All That Remains

- Philip Labonte – vocals
- Oli Herbert – guitar, acoustic guitar
- Mike Martin – guitar
- Matt Deis – bass, piano
- Michael Bartlett – drums

Additional

- Adam Dutkiewicz – production, engineering, mixing
- Louie Teran – mastering
- Mike D'Antonio – artwork
