= Foreign Objects (band) =

American metal band

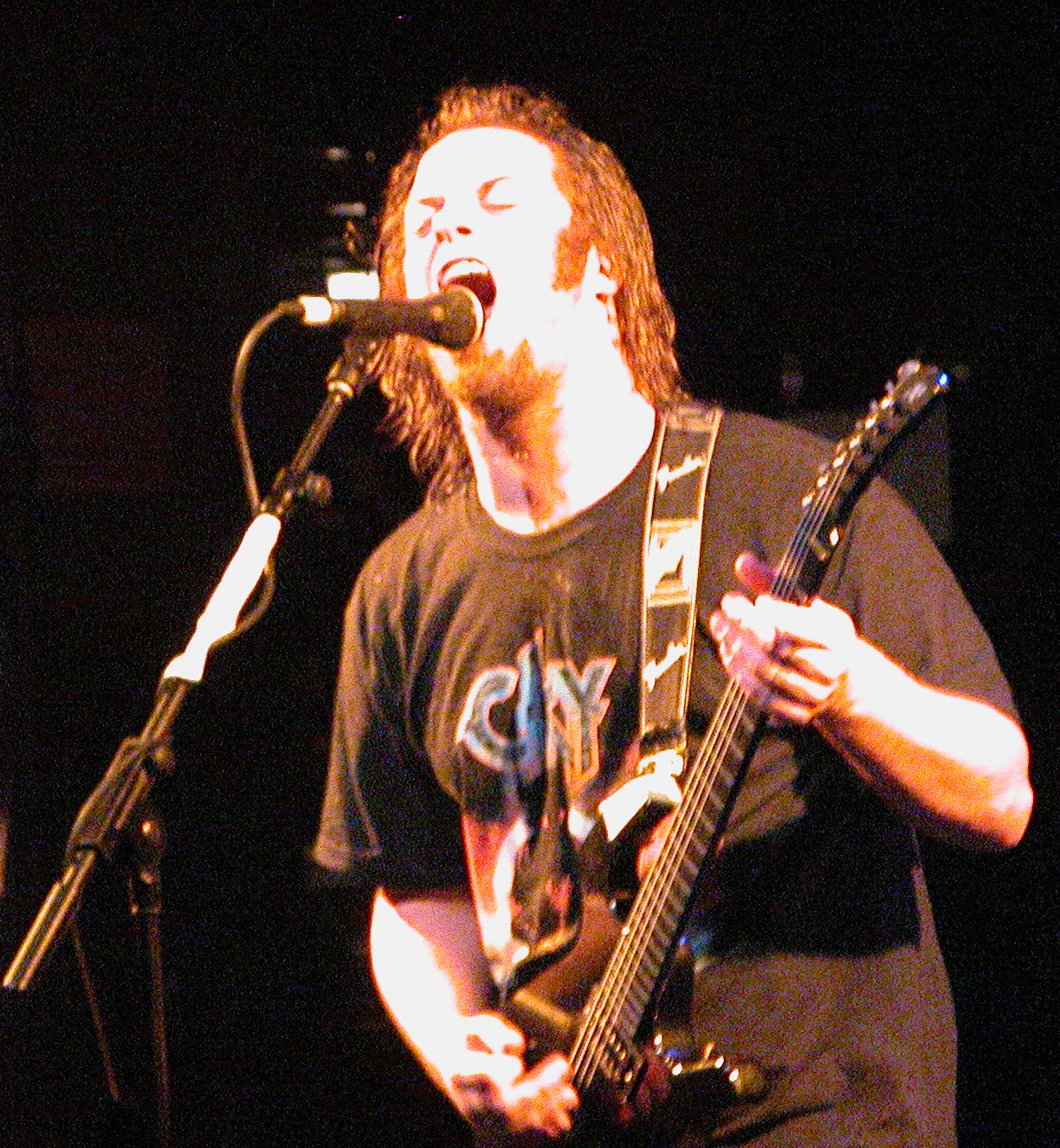
- Deron Miller, the only constant member of the band, in 2009

Background information
- Origin: West Chester, Pennsylvania, U.S.
- Genres: Technical death metal; progressive metal
- Years active: 1995–1998; 2003–2004; 2014–2016
- Labels: Distant; World of Rock
- Spinoffs: CKY
- Past members: Deron Miller; Jess Margera; Dave Sudock; Shaun Luera; Tim Luera; Kenneth Hunter

Foreign Objects was an American heavy metal band from West Chester, Pennsylvania. Formed in 1995, the band is centered on vocalist and guitarist Deron Miller, who is the only constant member. During its initial tenure, the band released one extended play (EP), The Undiscovered Numbers & Colors in 1995, before founding members Miller and Jess Margera (drums) went on to form CKY.

Miller returned to the moniker in 2003 to complete work on the album Universal Culture Shock, which featured contributions from guitarist James Murphy. The band returned again in 2014 with a new full lineup and recorded the album Galactic Prey, which was released in 2015.

== History ==
=== 1992–1998: Formation, early years and debut EP ===
Deron Miller and Jess Margera first met at East High School in West Chester, Pennsylvania in 1992, and began performing together as Foreign Objects in 1995. The duo recorded its five-track debut EP The Undiscovered Numbers & Colors with engineers Bob Zeigler and Matt Wacik in the summer of 1995 at Trix Trax Recording Studios in Malvern, Pennsylvania, and released it through Distant Recordings on October 1 that year.

By 1996, Miller, Margera and live bassist Ryan Bruni were performing together under the name Oil (a group which would later evolve into CKY), although Foreign Objects did continue recording up until 1998. The first lineup of the band performed two live shows, at least one of which took place at Henderson High School.

=== 2003–2004: Return with Universal Culture Shock ===
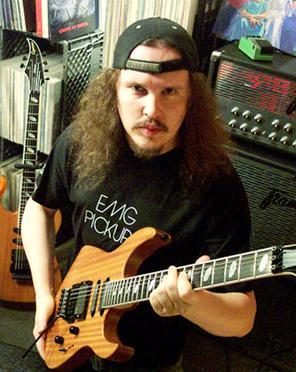
James Murphy performed additional guitar on Universal Culture Shock.

In October 2003, the pair began recording songs for a planned second Foreign Objects release at co-producer John Teague's West Chester studio. Miller enlisted former Death guitarist James Murphy, with whom he was then working on the Death tribute album Within the Mind: In Homage to the Musical Legacy of Chuck Schuldiner, to play lead guitar on the songs. Murphy also co-mixed (with Teague) and mastered the album. Miller praised Murphy's contributions, claiming they made the album "a thousand times better".

Recording was completed by spring 2004. Universal Culture Shock/Undiscovered Numbers & Colors, featuring the newly finished songs in addition to a remixed and remastered version of the band's original EP, was released on October 31, 2004, by Distant Recordings in a limited run of 2,000 copies, distributed exclusively through online retailer Amazon.com. The album was later included in the Distant box set Distant Recordings 15 Years in 2009.

=== 2014–2022: Reformation and Galactic Prey ===
Miller revived the Foreign Objects moniker in 2014, revealing that the group was working on an album entitled Galactic Prey, for which the title track was released in March that year. A campaign on crowdfunding website Indiegogo was later set up for the album, successfully raising the target $13,000. The album was originally slated to feature contributions from Jonathan Masi, a songwriter and fan of the band who reached out to Miller with concepts and ideas for a number of songs.

As of April 2014, the lineup of the band included guitarist Dave Sudock and bassist Shaun Luera, with Tim Yeung planned to take over on drums. Miller later confirmed that Luera's brother Tim had joined on drums, and later in the year Sudock was replaced by Kenneth Hunter. Miller has claimed that he originally invited Margera to be a part of the Foreign Objects reunion, but that he declined. Galactic Prey was released on October 18, 2015. In January 2016, Miller revealed that the band would be working on the follow-up to Galactic Prey, which would be titled Lean, Mean and Bleeding Green, that year.

All four members of Foreign Objects also performed as 96 Bitter Beings. During that band's 2022 of America, Tim Luera abruptly left the band hours before a live show was to take place, followed shortly by his brother Shaun. Miller has stated that since their departure, neither of the Luera brothers have reached out to him to explain their actions and, as a result, would not be welcome to rejoin the band. Miller has since stated that he has no future plans to continue Foreign Objects outside of re-releasing previously released material.

== Musical style and influence ==
The musical style of Foreign Objects has been described by music news website Blabbermouth.net as "neo-technical death metal". Founding member Deron Miller describes it as "a project that expands on the style of spacey progressive death metal that Pestilence and Cynic started in 1993", referring to the releases of Spheres and Focus, respectively.

== Band members ==
- Deron Miller – vocals, rhythm guitar, synthesizers (1995–1998, 2003–2004, 2014–2022), lead guitar, bass (1995–1998, 2003–2004)
- Jess Margera – drums, backing vocals (1995–1998, 2003–2004)
- Dave Sudock – lead guitar (2014)
- Kenneth Hunter – lead guitar (2014–2022)
- Shaun Luera – bass, backing vocals (2014–2022)
- Tim Luera – drums (2014–2022)

== Discography ==
Studio albums

Title	Album details
Universal Culture Shock/ Undiscovered Numbers & Colors	Released: October 31, 2004; Label: Distant; Format: 2xCD
Galactic Prey	Released: October 18, 2015; Label: Distant; Formats: CD, DL

Extended plays

Title	Album details
The Undiscovered Numbers & Colors	Released: October 1, 1995; Label: Distant; Format: CD

Singles

Title	Year	Album
"Test It Out"	2009	Universal Culture Shock
"Test It Out" (reissue)	2013	Universal Culture Shock
"Genesis 12/A"	2014	Universal Culture Shock
