= Jess Margera =

American drummer (born 1978)

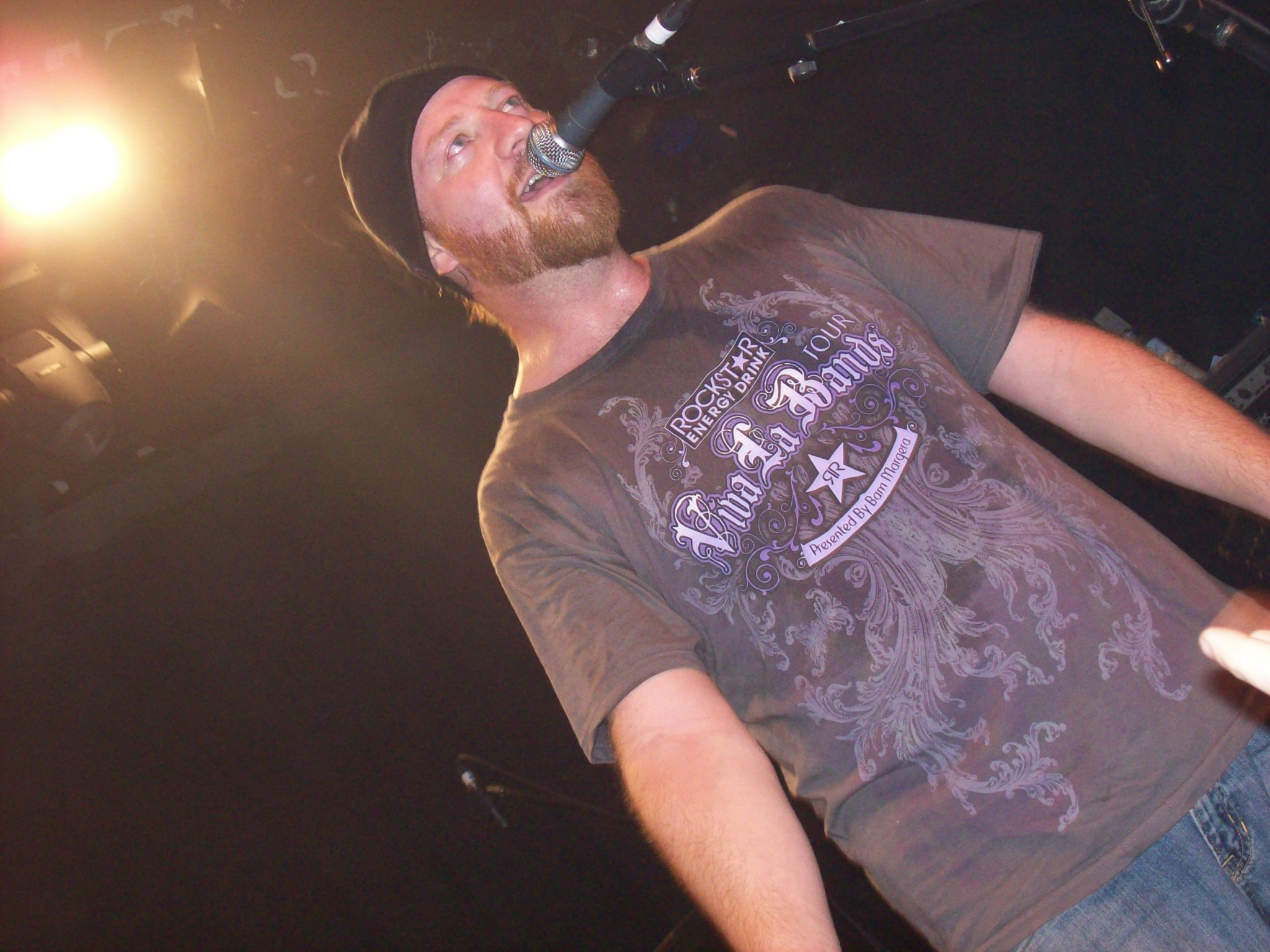
- Margera in 2010
- Born: Jesse Margera; August 28, 1978 (age 48)
- Occupation: Musician
- Years active: 1993–present
- Children: 4
- Parents: Phil Margera (father); April Margera (mother)
- Relatives: Bam Margera (brother); Vincent Margera (uncle)
- Musical career
- Origin: West Chester, Pennsylvania, U.S.
- Genres: Heavy metal; alternative metal; hard rock; alternative rock
- Instrument: Drums
- Member of: CKY; The Company Band; Viking Skull; Sovereign Eagle
- Formerly of: Foreign Objects; Gnarkill; Fuckface Unstoppable

Jesse Margera (born August 28, 1978) is an American musician and television personality. He is best known as the drummer of the rock band CKY, which he co-founded in 1998. Prior to CKY, Margera performed in the band Foreign Objects with former CKY vocalist and guitarist Deron Miller, and he has since worked with Gnarkill, Viking Skull, The Company Band, Fuckface Unstoppable, and Sovereign Eagle. Margera has also appeared in the CKY video series and the Viva La Bam and Jackass television series alongside his brother Bam.

== Early life ==
Margera was born on August 28, 1978, and raised in West Chester, Pennsylvania to April and Phil Margera. He is the older brother of professional skateboarder and TV personality Bam Margera, alongside whom he is a founding member of the CKY crew, which worked on the video series of the same name. He chose to play the drums as he had two uncles who played the instrument, one of whom later worked as a drum technician on a CKY tour. His "biggest influence" was Led Zeppelin drummer John Bonham, but as a young musician he also took an interest in jazz drummers such as Elvin Jones.

== Career ==
=== 1993–2002: Foreign Objects, CKY and Gnarkill ===
Margera first played in a band in 1991 or 1992. One of his first bands was Soalroach, which featured brother Bam and friend Ryan Dunn. He later formed Foreign Objects with future CKY vocalist and guitarist Deron Miller, whom he originally met at high school. The band released its debut extended play (EP) The Undiscovered Numbers & Colors in 1995. Along with bassist Ryan Bruni, the duo later performed under the name Oil, before meeting guitarist Chad I Ginsburg (who was then working as an audio engineer) and changing the name of the band to CKY. Speaking about the formation of the band, Margera recalled in a 2003 interview that the main reason he joined CKY was Miller's guitar playing ability, particularly his ability to write "complicated [guitar] riffs that are catchy".

As a member of CKY, Margera performed drums on all five of the band's studio albums, and was credited for contributing to songwriting on Infiltrate•Destroy•Rebuild.

Margera was also member of the CKY-related comedy band Gnarkill, formed in 2002, alongside Brandon DiCamillo on vocals, guitarist Rich Vose and brother Bam on keyboards; he performed on both studio albums: 2002's Gnarkill and 2006's GnarKill vs. Unkle Matt and the ShitBirdz.

=== 2002–2011: Viking Skull and The Company Band ===
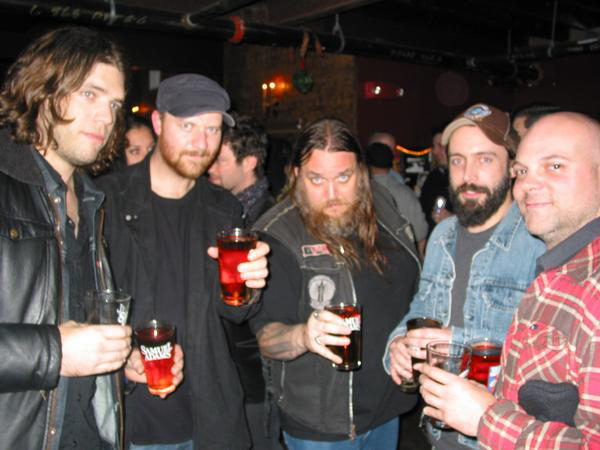
Margera (second from left) formed The Company Band in 2007 with Neil Fallon and James Rota

In November 2006, it was announced that Margera had joined English band Viking Skull, replacing founding member Gordon Morrison. Speaking about his replacement of Morrison, Margera revealed that he unwittingly contributed to the temporary breakup of the band in 2006, after drinking heavily with the band on tour. The new lineup released the album Chapter Two in September 2007, which was mixed by CKY guitarist Chad I Ginsburg. Viking Skull and Ginsburg (this time as producer) worked together again for the follow-up album Doom, Gloom, Heartache & Whiskey, recorded and released in 2008 in the US. The CKY collaboration was extended further, as Joe Frantz and Margera's brother Bam directed the music video for the song "Hair of the Dog".

In addition to his work with CKY and Viking Skull, in 2007 Margera formed The Company Band, a supergroup featuring Clutch frontman Neil Fallon and Fireball Ministry frontman James Rota. Each of the bands had toured with one another between 2005 and 2006, after which the group began jamming together and eventually formed into an official band. With the addition of guitarist Dave Bone and bassist Jason Diamond, the band recorded its debut EP Sign Here, Here and Here with producer Andrew Alekel and released it later in the year. The band recorded its full-length debut in 2009, and released it in November that year as The Company Band. Another EP, Pros & Cons, was released in 2012.

=== 2011–present: Fuckface Unstoppable and future ===
The fate of CKY was cast into doubt in 2011, when the band released a video in which each member spoke about their desires for the future of the band; all members but Ginsburg wanted to record solo albums, while the guitarist favored releasing another CKY album. Miller later claimed that Ginsburg had left the band, while Margera tried to calm the situation by suggesting that Miller had problems with alcohol abuse, and that he needed "support ... not insult[s]". Margera, along with Ginsburg and bassist Matt "Matty J" Janaitis, later returned as CKY in 2012 with Year Long Disaster frontman Daniel Davies in place of Miller. This lineup (with Matt Deis in place of Janaitis) later reunited in 2015, following another split with Miller. Margera has claimed that Davies offered to join the band during a phone call with the drummer, after he had performed on the singer's solo album.

Margera also performs drums in brother Bam's group Fuckface Unstoppable, and has contributed to both studio albums: Stórfréttir Í Reykjavík and Fuckface Unstoppable.

On June 16, 2017, the fifth CKY album titled The Phoenix was released. The band released an EP titled Too Precious to Kill on November 22, 2018.

Jess and Ginsburg are currently working on a new CKY album, titled New Reason to Dream.

Jess Margera is divorced.

== Discography ==
with Foreign Objects

- The Undiscovered Numbers & Colors (1995)
- Universal Culture Shock (2004)

with CKY

- Volume 1 (1999)
- Volume 2 (1999)
- Infiltrate•Destroy•Rebuild (2002)
- An Answer Can Be Found (2005)
- Carver City (2009)
- The Phoenix (2017)
- Too Precious to Kill (2018)
- New Reason to Dream (TBA)

with Gnarkill

- Gnarkill (2002)
- GnarKill vs. Unkle Matt and the ShitBirdz (2006)

with Viking Skull

- Chapter Two (2007)
- Blackened Sunrise (2007)
- Doom, Gloom, Heartache & Whiskey (2008)
- Cursed By the Sword (2012)
- Live at Voodoo Lounge (2014)
- Viking Skull (2016)

with The Company Band

- Sign Here, Here and Here (2007)
- The Company Band (2009)
- Pros & Cons (2012)

with Fuckface Unstoppable

- Stórfréttir Í Reykjavík (2013)
- Fuckface Unstoppable (2014)

with The Evesdroppers

- The Evesdroppers (2016)

with Sovereign Eagle

- Lady Strange (2022)
- Sovereign Eagle (2022)

with Thoughts & Prayers

- Thoughts & Prayers (2022)

== Filmography ==
=== Films ===
Year	Title	Role	Notes
1998	Toy Machine: Jump Off a Building	Himself	Direct-to-video
1999	CKY	Himself	Soundtrack; Direct-to-video
2000	CKY2K	Himself	Soundtrack; Direct-to-video
2001	CKY 3	Himself	Soundtrack; Direct-to-video
2001	CKY Documentary	Himself	Soundtrack; Direct-to-video
2002	Jackass: The Movie	Himself	Soundtrack; Guest appearances
2002	CKY4: The Latest & Greatest	Himself	Soundtrack; Direct-to-video
2003	Haggard: The Movie	Bum/Tetris addict/Gnarkill drummer	Soundtrack
2006	Jackass Number Two	Himself	Guest appearances
2007	Jackass 2.5	Himself	Guest appearances
2008	Bam Margera Presents: Where the #$%& Is Santa?	Himself	Direct-to-video
2009	Minghags	Bar Dipshit with hat/Gnarkill drummer	Soundtrack
2009	Skittin Across America	Himself	
2009	Jackass: The Lost Tapes	Himself	Archived footage
2010	Jackass 3D	Himself	Soundtrack; Guest appearances
2011	Jackass 3.5	Himself	Guest appearances
2014	Borrowed Happiness		Musician
2021	This Is Gwar	Himself	Documentary
2022	Humanity Stoked	Himself	Documentary

=== Television ===
Year	Title	Role	Notes
2000–2001	Jackass	Himself	Soundtrack; 7 episodes
2003–2006	Viva La Bam	Himself	Soundtrack; 6 episodes
2007	Bam's Unholy Union	Himself	Soundtrack; 9 episodes
2008	Jackassworld.com: 24 Hour Takeover	Himself	TV special Guest appearances
2011	A Tribute to Ryan Dunn	Himself	TV documentary
2014	CKY: The Greatest Hits	Himself	TV special
2017	Epicly Later'd: Bam Margera	Himself	TV documentary Archive footage

=== Web series ===
Year	Title	Role	Notes
2018	Bathroom Break Podcast	Himself	Podcast; 1 episode
2023	The Nine Club	Himself	Podcast; 1 episode
2026	Steve-O's Wild Ride!	Himself	Podcast; 1 episode
2026	Bathroom Break Podcast	Himself	Podcast; 1 episode
