= Matt Deis =

American bassist

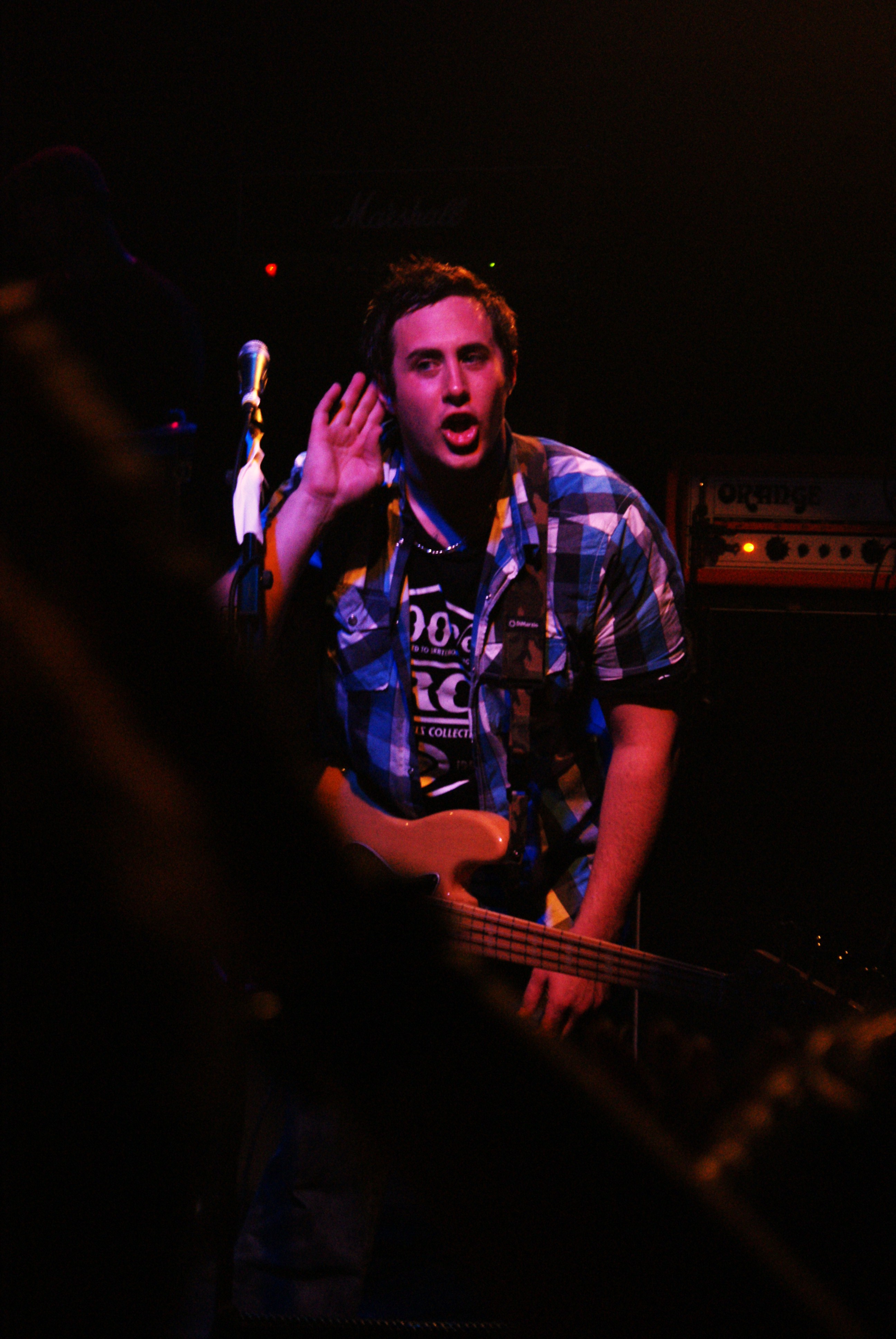
- Deis with CKY in 2009

Background information
- Genres: Alternative metal; post-grunge; metalcore; alternative rock
- Occupation: Bassist
- Years active: 2003–present
- Member of: All That Remains
- Formerly of: CKY, Thompson Square

Matt Deis is an American bass guitarist. Originally from West Springfield, Massachusetts, he is best known as the bassist of the rock band CKY with whom he performed between 2005 and 2010, returning in 2015 and departing again in 2019, and the current bassist of heavy metal band All That Remains, with whom he performed between 2003 and 2005, but made his return in 2022. From 2019 to 2020, Deis performed with American Idol finalist Tristan McIntosh. From summer 2021-22, Deis was the touring bassist for country music duo, Thompson Square, until leaving to rejoin All That Remains. Deis filled in with Saving Abel on select dates in the summer of 2023. In the fall of 2023, Deis served as touring bassist for country artist, Mitchell Tenpenny. As of 2024 Deis is touring as the bassist in Babymetal's backing group, the Kami Band.

== Early life ==
Deis lived in New Hampshire until the age of four when his family moved to West Springfield, Massachusetts. He started taking guitar lessons from Oli Herbert of All That Remains, and eventually started playing bass for the band. During his time in All That Remains, Deis co-wrote and played bass on their album This Darkened Heart. Tours with bands such as Gwar, Slipknot, As I Lay Dying, and Killswitch Engage followed.

== CKY ==
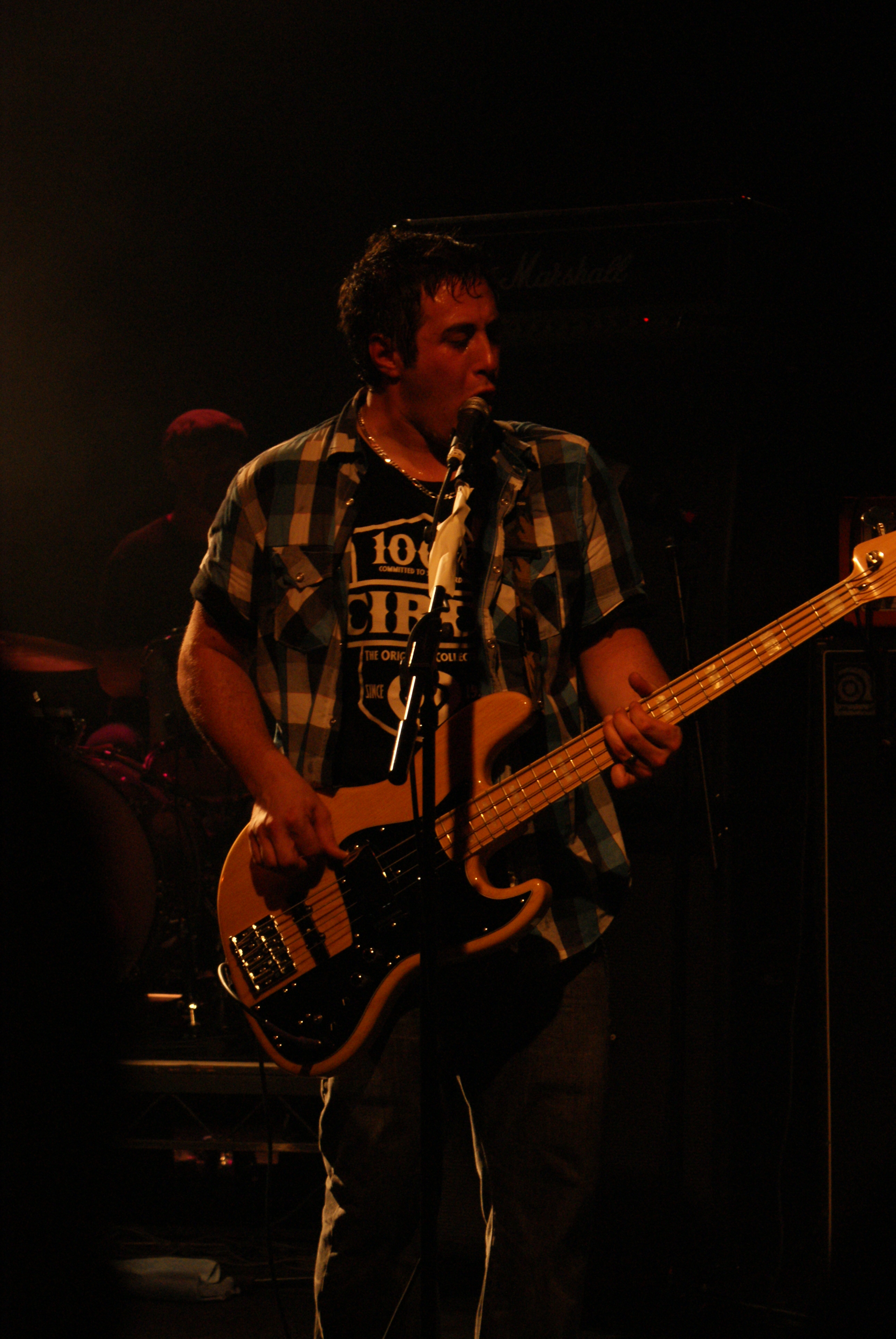
Deis with CKY in 2009

In 2005, Deis auditioned for and subsequently joined CKY. He has since toured across the United States, Australia and Europe with the band.

In 2010, Deis departed CKY stating he was unable to commit to the band while experiencing health issues.

In 2015, Deis reunited with CKY for a concert in Cleveland, Ohio which benefited the family of Ryan Dunn. CKY then entered the studio with Deis to record the album The Phoenix. Deis appeared in the music videos for the songs "Head For a Breakdown", "Replaceable", and "Wiping Off the Dead". In the summer of 2019, Deis released a statement outlining his departure for the band and offering his support and thanks to the band, their crew, and their fans.

== Discography ==
- All That Remains – This Darkened Heart (2004) – bass and piano
- The Autumn Offering – Revelations of the Unsung (2004) – piano on "Revelations"
- CKY – Live at Mr. Smalls (2007) – bass
- CKY – Carver City (May 2009) – bass on "Hellions on Parade", "The Boardwalk Body", "Imaginary Threats", "Karmaworks", and bass/keyboards on "Stripped Your Speech"
- CKY – The Phoenix (June 2017) – bass, synthesizers
- CKY – Too Precious to Kill (2018) – bass, synthesizers
- Mass Theory – Diamond Dust (2021) – bass on “And Lose Yourself”, “I Implore You”, “Crooked Hands”, “Numbers”, and “Lucidavidity”
- All That Remains – Antifragile (2025) – bass
