= 2024 in heavy metal music =

This is a timeline documenting the events of heavy metal in the year 2024.

== Bands disbanded ==
- Amen
- Botch
- Destrage
- Issues
- Jane's Addiction (indefinite hiatus)
- Misery Signals
- Monuments (indefinite hiatus)
- Mr. Big
- Otep
- Rage Against the Machine
- Solution .45
- Twelve Foot Ninja
- UFO
- Veil of Maya (hiatus)

== Bands reformed ==
- Absu
- Acid Bath
- All Shall Perish
- Coalesce (one-off)
- Crossfade
- Gordi
- Horse the Band
- Kylesa
- Linkin Park
- Mnemic
- Nachtmystium
- Nailbomb
- Nevermore
- Slayer
- The 3rd and the Mortal
- The Sword
- Xerath

== Events ==
- On January 5, Grave announced the departure of long-time members bassist Tobias Cristiansson and guitarist Mika Lagrén, putting the band's 2024 live activities on hold.
- On January 13, 3 Inches of Blood performed their first show in nine years at the Commodore Ballroom in Vancouver.
- On January 16, Mercyful Fate announced the band was parting ways with bassist Joey Vera. He was replaced by Becky Baldwin, who had previously filled in for Vera during the band's 2022 tour.
- On January 17, Immortal Disfigurement announced that their debut studio album would be delayed due to mixing and mastering issues. A day later, guitarist and chief songwriter Harry Tadayon announced his departure from the band due to him feeling that he wasn't getting enough credit for his work. Drummer Leo McClain would also leave the band shortly after that due to him wishing to avoid legal issues.
- In January, Issues embarked on a six-show farewell tour after a three-year hiatus without vocalist Tyler Carter, who was fired from the band for multiple accusations of grooming and sexual misconduct.
- On February 1, Lynch Mob began what was announced as a year-and-a-half long farewell tour, titled The Final Ride, in Warrendale, Pennsylvania.
- On February 5, founding member Phil Demmel announced his departure from Vio-lence.
- On February 5, after years of rumors and speculation since Slayer's split, Kerry King unveiled details about his solo project.
- On February 11, Kingdom Come announced they were parting ways with frontman Keith St. John and replacing him with Ezekiel "Zeke" Kaplan. The band also revealed that Matt Muckle would be replacing original drummer James Kottak, who had died the month before.
- On March 1, Sepultura began what was announced as a year-and-a-half long farewell tour in celebration of their 40th anniversary, titled "Celebrating Life Through Death", at the Arena Hall in Belo Horizonte. Three days before the tour started, it was announced that longtime drummer Eloy Casagrande had abruptly quit the band as early as February 6, being replaced by Suicidal Tendencies' Greyson Nekrutman.
- On March 27, Skid Row announced the band was parting ways with vocalist Erik Grönwall, due to his health issues. Lzzy Hale of Halestorm filled in for him for four shows.
- On April 2, Misery Signals announced the band will break-up after a final tour, titled "The Blood Is Forever, Love Is Forever Farewell Tour", which will feature the band's current and former vocalists.
- On April 21, Ozzy Osbourne was officially announced among the 2024 inductees into the Rock and Roll Hall of Fame.
- On April 30, after months of speculation, Slipknot officially confirmed Eloy Casagrande (formerly of Sepultura) as their new drummer.
- On June 6, Power Trip played their first show since original frontman Riley Gale's death in 2020 at The Glass House in Pomona, California, with Seth Gilmore taking over on vocals.
- On July 19, Chimaira performed at the 2024 Inkcarceration Fest, their first festival concert in 14 years.
- On July 20, the Klash of the Ruhrpott festival took place at the Amphitheater Gelsenkirchen in Gelsenkirchen, Germany. For the first time, the "Big Teutonic Four" — Kreator, Sodom, Destruction, and Tankard — performed on the same stage. However, Kreator, who were the headlining act, had their set cut short after 10 songs due to a severe weather warning, which was followed by a thunderstorm.
- On August 18, longtime Dimmu Borgir guitarist Galder announced his departure from the band so he could focus more on his own band, Old Man's Child.
- On September 3, longtime DevilDriver guitarist Mike Spreitzer announced his departure from the band.
- On September 5, after a seven-year hiatus, Linkin Park announced a new album, new lineup and plans to tour this year, with vocalist Emily Armstrong replacing the late Chester Bennington and drummer Colin Brittain replacing Rob Bourdon.
- On September 13, Jane's Addiction had a major onstage incident during their concert at the Leader Bank Pavilion in Boston as part of the 2024 North American tour with the reunited original line-up. Lead singer Perry Farrell and guitarist Dave Navarro engaged in an altercation after Farrell shoved and punched Navarro, that had to be broken up by the crew, leading to an abrupt end to the show. The band subsequently issued a public apology, cancelled the remainder of the tour and went on an indefinite hiatus.
- Following the release of their tenth studio album on September 20, Nightwish went on a touring hiatus, scheduled to last for two to three years.
- On September 20, Corrosion of Conformity founding member, bassist and vocalist Mike Dean announced his departure from the band.
- On September 22, Slayer played their first show since disbanding in 2019 at Riot Fest.
- On October 18, As I Lay Dying bassist and clean vocalist Ryan Neff announced his departure from the band, citing a need to benefit his "personal and professional journey". Just six days later, guitarist Ken Susi and drummer Nick Pierce also announced their departures from the band, stating that their "personal morals have been tested to a breaking point" and needing to preserve "personal health and integrity". In conjunction with Pierce and Susi, the band's touring manager resigned as well, effectively cancelling the planned European tour for their upcoming album, Through Storms Ahead. On October 30, longtime guitarist Phil Sgrosso announced his departure from the band, adding that the band "no longer offers a healthy or safe environment for anyone involved" and that he could not "enable further actions that could negatively affect anyone working within this space", leaving lead vocalist Tim Lambesis the sole remaining member of the band. Lambesis addressed the situation on November 4, agreeing with what was said and supporting his bandmates' decisions to leave. He also stated his intention to keep the band alive with a more positive and collaborative environment.
- On December 7, longtime Iron Maiden drummer Nicko McBrain announced his retirement from touring with the band. A day later, Simon Dawson of British Lion was announced as his replacement.
- On December 9, longtime Within Temptation keyboardist and composer Martijn Spierenburg announced his departure from the band.
- Cirith Ungol retired from performing live at the end of this year.

== Deaths ==
- January 4 – Jan Němec, engineer and producer of numerous metal bands including Celtic Frost, Grave Digger, Helloween, and Running Wild, died from lung disease.
- January 9 – James Kottak, former drummer of Scorpions, Kingdom Come, and Warrant, died from undisclosed reasons at the age of 61.
- January 17 – Martin Lacroix, former vocalist of Cryptopsy, died from undisclosed reasons.
- February 2 – Craig Simons, former drummer of Famous Last Words, died from undisclosed reasons.
- February 16 – Greg "Fritz" Hinz, drummer of Helix, died from cancer at the age of 68.
- February 20 – Vitalij Kuprij, keyboardist of Trans-Siberian Orchestra, Artension, and Ring of Fire, died from undisclosed reasons at the age of 49.
- March 6 – Tarmizi "Miji" Mokhtar, former drummer of Cromok, died from liver cancer at the age of 58.
- March 10 – Blake Harrison, bassist of Hatebeak and former sampler of Pig Destroyer, died from heart failure at the age of 48.
- March 10 – T. M. Stevens, former bassist for Steve Vai, died from undisclosed reasons at the age of 72.
- April 2 – Jerry Abbott, father of Dimebag Darrell and Vinnie Paul and producer of Pantera's first four studio albums, died from undisclosed reasons at the age of 80.
- April 5 – C. J. Snare, vocalist of FireHouse, died from cardiac arrest at the age of 64.
- April 15 – Reita, bassist of The Gazette, died from undisclosed reasons at the age of 42.
- April 19 – Eddie Sutton, vocalist of Leeway, died from cancer at the age of 59.
- April 26 – Robin George, former guitarist of Thin Lizzy and musician, engineer, and producer of numerous artists, including Robert Plant, David Byron, Quartz, Witchfinder General, and Glenn Hughes, died after a long illness at the age of 68.
- May 8 – Tommy Viator, former drummer of Disincarnate and former keyboardist of Acid Bath, died from undisclosed reasons.
- May 18 – Jon Wysocki, former drummer of Staind and Soil, died from liver issues at the age of 56.
- May 29 – Brad Raub, bassist of Eternal Champion, died from undisclosed reasons at the age of 36.
- June 4 – Simone "Yorga S.M." Amicucci, former vocalist and multi-instrumentalist of Aborym, died from undisclosed reasons.
- June 24 – Shifty Shellshock, vocalist of Crazy Town, died from an accidental drug overdose at the age of 49.
- June 30 – Peter Collins, engineer and producer of numerous artists including Rush, Queensrÿche, Suicidal Tendencies, Alice Cooper, Bon Jovi, and Gary Moore, died from pancreatic cancer at the age of 73.
- July 17 – Ciriaco "Pinche Peach" Quezada, sampler and vocalist of Brujeria, died from severe heart complications at the age of 57.
- July 24 – Bill Crook, former bassist of Spiritbox, died from undisclosed reasons.
- July 26 – Tomáš "Monster" Vendl, former bassist of Master's Hammer, died from undisclosed reasons at the age of 52.
- August 1 – Pieter Verpaalen, former vocalist of Textures, died from undisclosed reasons.
- August 7 – Jack Russell, former vocalist of Great White, died from Lewy body dementia at the age of 63.
- August 9 – Dave Sweetapple, bassist of Witch, died from undisclosed reasons at the age of 58.
- August 16 – Tore Ylvisaker, keyboardist of Ulver, died from undisclosed reasons at the age of 54.
- August 19 – Erik Barrett, bassist of 100 Demons, died from undisclosed reasons.
- August 26 – Sean Blosl, former guitarist of Sanctuary, died from complications after a vehicle accident at the age of 58.
- September 2 – Peter "P.K." Kubik, guitarist and bassist of Abigor, died by suicide at the age of 49.
- September 18 – John "Juan Brujo" Lepe, vocalist of Brujeria, died from a heart attack at the age of 61.
- September 19 – Andreas "Samson" Samonil, former drummer of Vendetta, died from undisclosed reasons.
- September 20 – Fernando Ponce de León, former flutist of Mägo de Oz, died from multiple organ failure at the age of 59.
- September 27 – Pedro "Pit" Passarell, bassist and former vocalist of Viper, died from pancreatic cancer at the age of 56.
- September 30 – Dave Allison, former guitarist and backing vocalist of Anvil, died from cancer at the age of 68.
- October 7 – Curtis Beeson, former drummer of Nasty Savage and Massacre, died from undisclosed reasons at the age of 60.
- October 14 – Karl Näslund, former guitarist of In Flames, died from undisclosed reasons at the age of 51.
- October 21 – Paul Di'Anno, former vocalist of Iron Maiden and Gogmagog, died from heart disease at the age of 66.
- October 27 – Hayden Lamb, former drummer of Red, died from undisclosed reasons.
- November 4 – Mykola "Amorth" Sostin, former drummer and keyboardist of Drudkh, was killed in action during the Russian invasion of Ukraine at the age of 39.
- November 13 – Edgard Brito, keyboardist of Tuatha de Danann, died from undisclosed reasons at the age of 50.
- December 5 – Mick Moore, former bassist of Avenger and Blitzkrieg, died from undisclosed reasons.
- December 20 – Casey Chaos, vocalist of Amen, died from a heart attack at the age of 59.
- December 21 – John Sykes, former guitarist of Whitesnake, Thin Lizzy, Tygers of Pan Tang, and Blue Murder, died from cancer at the age of 65.
- December 29 – Eric "Sickie Wifebeater" Carlson, guitarist of Mentors, died from cancer at the age of 66.

== Albums released ==
=== January ===
Day	Artist	Album
5	Panzerchrist	All Witches Shall Burn (EP)
8	Trollfest	20 Years in the Wrong Lane (compilation album)
12	Asking Alexandria	Dark Void (EP)
12	Emil Bulls	Love Will Fix It
12	Exit Eden	Femmes Fatales
12	Greg Puciato	FC5N (EP)
12	Infant Island	Obsidian Wreath
12	The Plot in You	Vol. 1 (EP)
12	Project 86	Omni, Pt. 2
12	Russell / Guns	Medusa
12	Ryujin	Ryujin
12	Scanner	The Cosmic Race
16	Ribspreader	Reap Humanity
17	Nemophila	Evolve
19	Master	Saints Dispelled
19	The Rods	Rattle the Cage
19	Saxon	Hell, Fire and Damnation
22	Riley's L.A. Guns	The Dark Horse
26	Any Given Day	Limitless
26	Blood Red Throne	Nonagon
26	Caligula's Horse	Charcoal Grace
26	Dead by April	The Affliction
26	Inquisition	Veneration of Medieval Mysticism and Cosmological Violence
26	Kill the Thrill	Autophagie
26	Lucifer	Lucifer V
26	Madder Mortem	Old Eyes, New Heart
26	Mägo de Oz	Alicia en el Metalverso
26	Manticora	Mycelium
26	Static-X	Project: Regeneration Vol. 2
26	Whitechapel	Live in the Valley (live album)

=== February ===
Day	Artist	Album
2	Artillery	Raw Live (At Copenhell) (live album)
2	Enterprise Earth	Death: An Anthology
2	Ghoul	Noxious Concoctions (EP)
2	KMFDM	Let Go
2	Meanstreak	Blood Moon (EP)
2	Necrowretch	Swords of Dajjal
2	Persefone	Lingua Ignota: Part I (EP)
2	Striker	Ultrapower
9	Aphonnic	Crema
9	Chelsea Wolfe	She Reaches Out to She Reaches Out to She
9	Hacavitz	Muerte
9	Infected Rain	Time
9	The Last Ten Seconds of Life	No Name Graves
9	Les Claypool	Adverse Yaw: The Prawn Song Years (box set)
9	Morbid Saint	Swallowed by Hell
9	Per Wiberg	The Serpent's Here
10	Coldrain	Final Destination (XV Re:Recorded)
16	Crazy Lixx	Two Shots at Glory (compilation album)
16	Darkspace	Dark Space -II
16	Durbin	Screaming Steel
16	Honeymoon Suite	Alive
16	Ihsahn	Ihsahn
16	Illumishade	Another Side of You
16	The Obsessed	Gilded Sorrow
16	Samael	Passage – Live (live album)
16	See You Next Tuesday	Relapses (remix album)
23	Ace Frehley	10,000 Volts
23	Amaranthe	The Catalyst
23	Austrian Death Machine	Quad Brutal
23	Blaze Bayley	Circle of Stone
23	Borknagar	Fall
23	Darkest Hour	Perpetual I Terminal
23	Dust Bolt	Sound & Fury
23	Job for a Cowboy	Moon Healer
23	Lionheart	The Grace of a Dragonfly
23	Mick Mars	The Other Side of Mars
23	Sleepytime Gorilla Museum	Of the Last Human Being

=== March ===
Day	Artist	Album
1	Blind Channel	Exit Emotions
1	Bruce Dickinson	The Mandrake Project
1	David Reece	Baptized by Fire
1	Doro	Conqueress – Extended (EP)
1	Firewind	Stand United
1	Kiuas	Samooja: Pyhiinvaellus (EP)
1	Messiah	Christus Hypercubus
1	Ministry	Hopiumforthemasses
1	New Years Day	Half Black Heart
1	Suicidal Angels	Profane Prayer
5	Niklas Sundin	Wattudragaren
8	Before the Dawn	Archaic Flame (EP)
8	The End Machine	The Quantum Phase
8	Exhorder	Defectum Omnium
8	Judas Priest	Invincible Shield
8	Myrath	Karma
8	Sonata Arctica	Clear Cold Beyond
15	Aborted	Vault of Horrors
15	Atrophy	Asylum
15	DragonForce	Warp Speed Warriors
15	The Dread Crew of Oddwood	Rust & Glory
15	Lords of Black	Mechanics of Predacity
15	Mike Tramp	Mand Af En Tid
15	Necrophobic	In the Twilight Grey
15	Night Verses	Every Sound Has a Color in the Valley of Night: Part 2
15	Scott Stapp	Higher Power
15	Spoken	Reflection
15	Whom Gods Destroy	Insanium
22	Alestorm	Voyage of the Dead Marauder (EP)
22	Brodequin	Harbinger of Woe
22	Furor Gallico	Future to Come
22	Hamferð	Men Guðs hond er sterk
22	Khold	Du dømmes til Død
22	Leaves' Eyes	Myths of Fate
22	Sylvaine	Eg Er Framand (EP)
22	Thor	Ride of the Iron Horse
22	Unshine	Karn of Burnings
27	Paul Di'Anno's Warhorse	Stop the War (EP)
28	Sons of Alpha Centauri	Pull
29	The Absence	The Absence
29	Darkestrah	Nomad
29	Puscifer / A Perfect Circle / Primus	Sessanta E.P.P.P. (split EP)
29	The Quill	Wheel of Illusion
29	Rage	Afterlifelines
29	Sum 41	Heaven :x: Hell
29	While She Sleeps	Self Hell

=== April ===
Day	Artist	Album
5	Alpha Wolf	Half Living Things
5	Erra	Cure
5	Hour of Penance	Devotion
5	In Vain	Solemn
5	Ingested	The Tide of Death and Fractured Dreams
5	Iron Monkey	Spleen & Goad
5	Korpiklaani	Rankarumpu
5	Locrian	End Terrain
12	Attacker	The God Particle
12	Benighted	Ekbom
12	Blue Öyster Cult	Ghost Stories
12	Eidola	Eviscerate
12	Gun	Hombres
12	Imminence	The Black
12	Linkin Park	Papercuts (compilation album)
12	Northlane	Mirror's Edge (EP)
12	Týr	Battle Ballads
12	The Vision Bleak	Weird Tales
12	Whores.	War.
19	Balance of Power	Fresh from the Abyss
19	Big Brave	A Chaos of Flowers
19	Bongripper	Empty
19	Dawn of Ashes	Reopening the Scars
19	Feuerschwanz	Warriors
19	The Ghost Inside	Searching for Solace
19	High on Fire	Cometh the Storm
19	Loch Vostok	Opus Ferox II – Mark of the Beast
19	Melvins	Tarantula Heart
19	My Dying Bride	A Mortal Binding
19	Praying Mantis	Defiance
19	SeeYouSpaceCowboy	Coup de Grâce
19	Vanden Plas	The Empyrean Equation of the Long Lost Things
19	Winter	Live in Brooklyn NY (live album)
19	Zao	Live from the Church (live album)
20	Corey Taylor	CMF2B... or Not 2B
26	AC×DC	G.O.A.T.
26	Accept	Humanoid
26	Alien Ant Farm	~mAntras~
26	Black Tusk	The Way Forward
26	Cypecore	Make Me Real
26	Darkthrone	It Beckons Us All
26	Deicide	Banished by Sin
26	Disbelief	Killing Karma
26	Full of Hell	Coagulated Bliss
26	Lee Aaron	Tattoo Me (covers album)
26	Pentagram Chile	Eternal Life of Madness
26	Pestilence	Levels of Perception (best-of album)
26	Tygers of Pan Tang	Live Blood (live album)
26	Vesperian Sorrow	Awaken the Greylight

=== May ===
Day	Artist	Album
3	Dååth	The Deceivers
3	Gothminister	Pandemonium II: The Battle of the Underworlds
3	Keith Wallen	Infinity Now
3	P.O.D.	Veritas
3	The Plot in You	Vol. 2 (EP)
10	Anette Olzon	Rapture
10	Bossk	.4 (compilation album)
10	Freedom Call	Silver Romance
10	Incubus	Morning View XXIII
10	Kill II This	Variant
10	Knocked Loose	You Won't Go Before You're Supposed To
10	Like Moths to Flames	The Cycles of Trying to Cope
10	Necrophagia	Moribundis Grim
10	Onslaught	Skullcrusher (compilation album)
10	Powerman 5000	Abandon Ship
10	Riot V	Mean Streets
10	Sebastian Bach	Child Within the Man
10	Six Feet Under	Killing for Revenge
10	Uncle Acid & the Deadbeats	Nell' Ora Blu
10	Unleash the Archers	Phantoma
10	Warlord	Free Spirit Soar
17	Ayreon	01011001 – Live Beneath the Waves (live album)
17	Babylon A.D.	Rome Wasn't Built in a Day
17	Botanist	Paleobotany
17	Combichrist	CMBCRST
17	Demon	Invincible
17	Extortionist	Devoid of Love & Light
17	Gatecreeper	Dark Superstition
17	Hell:on	Shaman
17	Intervals	Memory Palace
17	Jamey Jasta	...And Jasta for All
17	Jinjer	Live in Los Angeles (live album)
17	Kerry King	From Hell I Rise
17	Marty Friedman	Drama
17	Nocturnus AD	Unicursal
17	Pain	I Am
17	Pallbearer	Mind Burns Alive
17	Pathology	Unholy Descent
17	Shark Island	Memento Mori – Live on the Strip (live album)
17	Slash	Orgy of the Damned
17	Ufomammut	Hidden
24	Bring Me the Horizon	Post Human: Nex Gen
24	Clint Lowery	Don't Say It (EP)
24	Evildead	Toxic Grace
24	Puya	Potencial
24	Red Handed Denial	A Journey Through Virtual Dystopia
24	Rotting Christ	Pro Xristou
24	Trail of Tears	Winds of Disdain (EP)
31	Bad Omens	Concrete Jungle [The OST] (remix album)
31	Black Sabbath	Anno Domini 1989–1995 (box set)
31	Candlemass	Tritonus Nights (live album)
31	Cloven Hoof	Heathen Cross
31	Exodus	British Disaster: The Battle of '89 (Live at the Astoria) (live album)
31	Nightrage	Remains of a Dead World
31	Rhapsody of Fire	Challenge the Wind
31	Thou	Umbilical
31	Trapt	The Fall

=== June ===
Day	Artist	Album
7	Apocalyptica	Plays Metallica Vol. 2 (covers album)
7	Bon Jovi	Forever
7	Dysrhythmia	Coffin of Conviction
7	Evergrey	Theories of Emptiness
7	The Hu	Live at Glastonbury (live album)
7	Immortal Disfigurement	King
7	Nightmare	Encrypted
7	The Omnific	The Law of Augmenting Returns
7	Richard Henshall	Mu Vol. 1 (EP)
7	Severe Torture	Torn from the Jaws of Death
7	Umbra Vitae	Light of Death
8	Abysmal Oceans	Ravenous Abyss
14	96 Bitter Beings	Return to Hellview
14	Axel Rudi Pell	Risen Symbol
14	Cadaverous Condition	Never Arrive, Never Return
14	Darkend	Viaticum
14	Julie Christmas	Ridiculous and Full of Blood
14	Malignancy	...Discontinued
14	Ulcerate	Cutting the Throat of God
21	Alcest	Les Chants de l'Aurore
21	Black Veil Brides	Bleeders (EP)
21	Dezperadoz	Moonshiner
21	Earthtone9	In Resonance Nexus
21	Kittie	Fire
21	Seven Spires	A Fortress Called Home
21	Sumac	The Healer
21	Thornhill	Live on Tour! (live album)
21	Wage War	Stigma
21	Within Temptation	Worlds Collide Tour – Live in Amsterdam (live album)
26	Crossfaith	Ark
28	Anvil	One and Only
28	Bridear	Born Again
28	Crystal Viper	The Silver Key
28	The Eternal	Skinwalker
28	The Exies	Closure (EP)
28	Illdisposed	In Chambers of Sonic Disgust
28	Islander	Grammy Nominated
28	Limbonic Art	Opus Daemoniacal
28	Neaera	All Is Dust
28	Nothing More	Carnal
28	Sear Bliss	Heavenly Down
28	X-Cops	XCAB (EP)

=== July ===
Day	Artist	Album
4	Nifelheim	Unholy Death (compilation album)
5	Kissin' Dynamite	Back with a Bang!
5	Krallice	Inorganic Rites
5	Kryptos	Decimator
5	Orden Ogan	The Order of Fear
5	Sumac	The Keeper's Tongue (EP)
5	Visions of Atlantis	Pirates II – Armada
5	Vulvodynia	Entabeni
5	Wormed	Omegon
5	Xasthur	Disharmonic Variations
12	Amorphis	Tales from the Thousand Lakes – Live at Tavastia (live album)
12	Blood Feast	Infinite Evolution
12	Forgotten Tomb	Nightfloating
12	Graphic Nature	Who Are You When No One Is Watching?
12	In Hearts Wake	Incarnation
12	King 810	Under the Black Rainbow (EP)
12	Massacration	Metal Is My Life
12	Mr. Big	Ten
12	Unearth	Bask in the Blood of Our Demons (EP)
12	Windwaker	Hyperviolence
13	Cephalotripsy	Epigenetic Neurogenesis
19	Deep Purple	=1
19	Orange Goblin	Science, Not Fiction
19	Paul Di'Anno's Warhorse	Paul Di'Anno's Warhorse
19	Sable Hills	Odyssey
22	War Babies	Vault (compilation album)
26	Category 7	Category 7
26	Dream Evil	Metal Gods
26	Ghost	Rite Here Rite Now (live album)
26	Metal Church	The Final Sermon (Live in Japan 2019) (live album)
26	Orpheus Omega	Emberglow
26	Powerwolf	Wake Up the Wicked
26	Verni	Dreadful Company
26	A Wake in Providence	I Write to You, My Darling Decay

=== August ===
Day	Artist	Album
1	Hirax	Faster Than Death (EP)
2	Convictions	The Fear of God
2	Lord of the Lost	Live at W:O:A (live album)
2	A Night in Texas	Digital Apocalypse
2	Ron Keel	Keelworld
9	Grinspoon	Whatever, Whatever
9	HammerFall	Avenge the Fallen
9	King Gizzard & the Lizard Wizard	Flight b741
9	Mushroomhead	Call the Devil
9	Siamese	Elements
9	Stahlmann	Phosphor
16	Dark Tranquillity	Endtime Signals
16	Falling in Reverse	Popular Monster
16	Left to Suffer	Leap of Death
23	Fleshgod Apocalypse	Opera
23	Koldbrann	Ingen Skånsel
23	Mike Tramp	Songs of White Lion – Vol. II (covers album)
23	Nile	The Underworld Awaits Us All
23	Simone Simons	Vermillion
23	Uniform	American Standard
23	Warlord	From the Ashes to the Archives – The Hot Pursuit Continues (compilation album)
23	Within the Ruins	Phenomena II
23	Zeal & Ardor	Greif
28	Lovebites	Lovebites EP II (EP)
30	Anciients	Beyond the Reach of the Sun
30	Elder	Live at BBC Maida Vale Studios (live album)
30	Leprous	Melodies of Atonement
30	Nails	Every Bridge Burning
30	Oceano	Living Chaos
30	To the Grave	Everyone's a Murderer
30	Wintersun	Time II
30	Wintersun	Time Package (compilation album)

=== September ===
Day	Artist	Album
4	Machine Head	Diamonds in the Rough '92–'93 (compilation album)
5	Pyrrhon	Exhaust
6	40 Watt Sun	Little Weight
6	Blitzkrieg	Blitzkrieg
6	God Dethroned	The Judas Paradox
6	Jordan Rudess	Permission to Fly
6	Marduk	Beast of Prey: Brutal Assault (live album)
6	Mr. Big	The Big Finish Live (live album)
6	Officium Triste	Hortus Venenum
13	156/Silence	People Watching
13	A Killer's Confession	Victim 1
13	Dale Crover	Glossolalia
13	Flotsam and Jetsam	I Am the Weapon
13	In Extremo	Wolkenschieber
13	Oceans of Slumber	Where Gods Fear to Speak
13	Satan	Songs in Crimson
13	Stryper	When We Were Kings
13	Thy Will Be Done	Pillar of Fire
13	Trelldom	...by the Shadows...
13	Victory	Circle of Life
13	Winterfylleth	The Imperious Horizon
13	Wolfbrigade	Life Knife Death
20	Attack Attack!	Disaster (EP)
20	Charlotte Wessels	The Obsession
20	Die So Fluid	Skin Hunger
20	Eclipse	Megalomanium II
20	Kanonenfieber	Die Urkatastrophe
20	Kublai Khan	Exhibition of Prowess
20	Michael Schenker	My Years with UFO (covers album)
20	Nightwish	Yesterwynde
20	Seether	The Surface Seems So Far
20	Skid Row	Live in London (live album)
20	Unto Others	Never, Neverland
20	Vended	Vended
20	Vision Divine	Blood and Angels' Tears
20	Void of Vision	What I'll Leave Behind
25	Galneryus	The Stars Will Light the Way
27	Agent Steel	Mad Locust Rising – Live at Hammersmith Odeon (live album)
27	The Black Dahlia Murder	Servitude
27	Heriot	Devoured by the Mouth of Hell
27	Paul Di'Anno	The Book of the Beast (compilation album)
27	Rolo Tomassi	Live at the Electric Ballroom (live album)
27	Serj Tankian	Foundations (EP)

=== October ===
Day	Artist	Album
1	Lords of the Trident	V.G.E.P. (EP)
1	Timo Tolkki	Classical Variations and Themes 2: Ultima Thule
3	Ignitor	Horns and Hammers
3	Sylosis	The Path (EP)
4	1349	The Wolf and the King
4	Abramelin	Sins of the Father
4	Blood Incantation	Absolute Elsewhere
4	D-A-D	Speed of Darkness
4	Fever 333	Darker White
4	Mother of Millions	Magna Mater
4	Mötley Crüe	Cancelled (EP)
4	Nasty Savage	Jeopardy Room
4	Texas Hippie Coalition	Gunsmoke
4	Transport League	We Are Satan's People
4	Wind Rose	Trollslayer
11	10 Years	Inner Darkness (EP)
11	Ad Infinitum	Abyss
11	Chat Pile	Cool World
11	The Crown	Crown of Thorns
11	Dragony	Hic Svnt Dracones
11	Heiress	Nowhere Nearer
11	House of Lords	Full Tilt Overdrive
11	Oranssi Pazuzu	Muuntautuja
11	Seven Hours After Violet	Seven Hours After Violet
11	The Sword	Live at Levitation (live album)
15	Infant Annihilator	Mister Sister Fister: Re-Conception (EP)
18	The Armed	Everlasting Gaze (EP)
18	Astral Doors	The End of It All
18	Deivos	Apophenia
18	Disentomb	Nothing Above (EP)
18	DGM	Endless
18	Ensiferum	Winter Storm
18	Fate	Reconnect 'n Ignite
18	Frozen Crown	War Hearts
18	Funeral	Gospel of Bones
18	Grand Magus	Sunraven
18	Immortal Bird	Sin Querencia
18	Jerry Cantrell	I Want Blood
18	Swallow the Sun	Shining
25	Amorphis	Rarities: 1991–2001 (compilation album)
25	Atreyu	The Pronoia Sessions (compilation album)
25	Behemoth	XXX Years ov Blasphemy (live album)
25	Better Lovers	Highly Irresponsible
25	Devin Townsend	PowerNerd
25	dUg Pinnick	Thingamajigger
25	Entheos	An End to Everything (EP)
25	Fit for an Autopsy	The Nothing That Is
25	Hatchet	Leave No Soul (EP)
25	Loudblast	Altering Fates and Destinies
25	Motörhead	We Take No Prisoners (The Singles 1995–2006) (box set)
25	Nuclear	Violent DNA (EP)
25	One Morning Left	Neon Inferno
25	Skinflint	Baloi
25	Taking the Head of Goliath	Futility of the Flesh (EP)
25	Turmion Kätilöt	Reset
31	Klogr	Fractured Realities

=== November ===
Day	Artist	Album
1	Brothers of Metal	Fimbulvinter
1	Cane Hill	A Piece of Me I Never Let You Find
1	Havok	New Eyes (EP)
1	Nachtmystium	Blight Privilege
1	Powerflo	Gorilla Warfare
1	Skillet	Revolution
1	Tribulation	Sub Rosa in Æternum
1	Vola	Friend of a Phantom
7	Counterparts	Heaven Let Them Die (EP)
7	Suidakra	Darkanakrad
8	1000mods	Cheat Death
8	The Body	The Crying Out of Things
8	The Browning	Omni
8	Delain	Dance with the Devil (EP)
8	Impellitteri	War Machine
8	Make Them Suffer	Make Them Suffer
8	Massacre	Necrolution
8	Paragon	Metalation
8	Paysage d'Hiver	Die Berge
8	The Plot in You	Vol. 3 (EP)
8	Seven Kingdoms	The Square (EP)
8	Sólstafir	Hin Helga Kvöl
8	Tungsten	The Grand Inferno
15	As I Lay Dying	Through Storms Ahead
15	Beyond Unbroken	Destruction
15	Chelsea Wolfe	Unbound (EP)
15	Empires of Eden	Guardians of Time
15	The Foreshadowing	New Wave Order
15	Linkin Park	From Zero
15	Poppy	Negative Spaces
15	Thanatos	Four Decades of Death (compilation album)
15	Thrown into Exile	Passageways (EP)
15	Thy Catafalque	XII: A Gyönyörü Álmok Ezután Jönnek
15	Worm Shepherd	Hunger
19	I Declare War	Downcast Vol. 2 (EP)
22	Body Count	Merciless
22	Dawn of Destiny	IX
22	Defeated Sanity	Chronicles of Lunacy
22	Marilyn Manson	One Assassination Under God – Chapter 1
22	Ocean Grove	Oddworld
22	Opeth	The Last Will and Testament
22	Storace	Crossfire
22	Xandria	Universal Tales (EP)
29	Konkhra	Sad Plight of Lucifer
29	Tesla	All About Love (EP)
29	Tierra Santa	Un Viaje Épico

=== December ===
Day	Artist	Album
6	Michael "Whip" Wilton	Volume 1
6	Nanowar of Steel	XX Years of Steel (live album)
6	The Old Dead Tree	Second Thoughts
6	Panzerchrist	Maleficium – Part 1
6	Tarja	Rocking Heels: Live at Hellfest (live album)
6	Thulcandra	Live Demise (live album)
13	Alberto Rigoni	Nemesis Call
13	Electric Wizard	Black Magic Rituals and Perversions – Vol. 1 (live album)
13	God Forbid	The Lost Noize (EP)
13	Helloween	Live at Budokan (live album)
13	Magic Kingdom	Blaze of Rage
20	Claudio Sanchez	Claudio Covers (EP)
20	Imminence	The Reclamation of I
20	Sadist	Jugular Bells (EP)
20	Subway to Sally	Post Mortem

Preceded by 2023	Heavy Metal Timeline; 2024	Succeeded by 2025
