= Neaera (album) =

Studio album by Neaera
- Released: 28 February 2020
- Genre: Death metal; melodic death metal
- Length: 43:55
- Label: Metal Blade
- Producer: Tristan Hachmeister

Neaera chronology
Ours Is the Storm (2013)	Neaera (2020)	All Is Dust (2024)

Singles from Neaera
- 1. "Torchbearer" Released: 12 December 2019; 2. "Catalyst" Released: 23 January 2020; 3. "Deathless" Released: 23 June 2020

Neaera is the self-titled seventh studio album by German melodic death metal band Neaera. It was released on 28 February 2020 through Metal Blade Records, their first album in seven years. Music videos were made for the singles "Torchbearer", "Catalyst", and "Deathless".

The cover artwork was created by Terje Johnsen, who has made most of the band's cover arts since their 2007 album Armamentarium. The album was mixed and mastered by Jacob Hansen (Volbeat, Heaven Shall Burn).

== Track listing ==
Neaera track listing
No.	Title	Length
1.	"Undrowned"	1:11
2.	"Catalyst"	4:27
3.	"False Shepherds"	4:17
4.	"Resurrection of Wrath"	4:11
5.	"Carriers"	5:24
6.	"Rid the Earth of the Human Virus"	3:19
7.	"Sunset of Mankind"	4:41
8.	"Lifeless"	3:40
9.	"Eruption in Reverse"	4:17
10.	"Torchbearer"	3:59
11.	"Deathless"	4:29
Total length:		43:55

== Personnel ==
=== Neaera ===
- Benjamin Hilleke – vocals, art direction
- Tobias Buck – guitar
- Stefan Keller – guitar
- Benjamin Donath – bass guitar
- Sebastian Heldt – drums

=== Credits ===
- Tristan Hachmeister – additional guitars and bass on "Sunset of Mankind", producer, recording
- Matthias Lohmöller – drum recording
- Jacob Hansen – mixing, mastering
- Terje Johnsen – cover art

== Charts ==
Chart performance for Neaera
Chart (2020)	Peak position
Austrian Albums (Ö3 Austria)	58
German Albums (Offizielle Top 100)	8
Swiss Albums (Schweizer Hitparade)	55
