= Legacy of Hate (band) =

Austrian death metal band

Legacy of Hate was an Austrian death metal band. They released four albums.

The band hails from Linz. Following their debut album in 1999, Death Trip, the band put out The Killing in 2000. Powermetal.de gave a good review; the album was "absolute blast", "truly energetic and tight" and "contains a killer dose of death metal". Noteworthily, Jethro Tull's "Locomotive Breath" was covered as "a devilish death metal song". Vampster seconded the rave review, calling The Killing "a death metal album that is absolutely flawless". It was without filler and was performed well: "Excellent songs, technically flawless, and all topped off with a powerful, pleasantly bass-heavy production".

Seeds of a Future Bizarre came out in 2003. Powermetal.de described it as highly melancholic and full of mood-swings.

Ahead of their fourth album, Legacy of Hate scored a deal to release it on Maintain Records. Unmitigated Evil was issued in 2008. At that point, Metal.de compared Legacy of Hate to a "little brother" of Nearea, finding the new album to lack originality. Though it did have quality, the sound was described as "thin, somewhat lackluster". Vampster drew lines to another band, Heaven Shall Burn. Though the inspirations were manifest, and most of the tracks "don't really stick in your head", Legacy of Hate had created "a few energetic tracks that shake the listener awake". Though the instrumental performances were good too, the album could only be recommended "to those who feel the need to buy every bit of variety in metalcore immediately".
