= Armamentarium =

Armamentarium may refer to

- Medical equipment
- the Latin term for an arsenal
- Armamentarium (album), 2007 album by German melodic death metal band Neaera
