= Drown with Me =

Drown with Me may refer to:

- Drown with Me, a song by Porcupine Tree from In Absentia
- Drown with Me, a song by Make them Suffer from How to Survive a Funeral
