= Forging the Eclipse =

Studio album by Neaera
- Released: 26 October 2010
- Genre: Melodic death metal, metalcore
- Length: 39:58
- Label: Metal Blade
- Producer: Alexander Dietz

Neaera chronology
Omnicide – Creation Unleashed (2009)	Forging the Eclipse (2010)	Ours Is the Storm (2013)

Forging the Eclipse is the fifth studio album by German melodic death metal band Neaera. It was released on 26 October 2010 through Metal Blade Records.

== Track listing ==
No.	Title	Length
1.	"The Forging"	1:00
2.	"Heaven's Descent"	3:41
3.	"In Defiance"	3:16
4.	"Eight Thousand Sorrows Deep"	4:17
5.	"Arise Black Vengeance"	3:04
6.	"Rubikon"	2:52
7.	"Sirens of Black"	4:31
8.	"Certitude"	2:50
9.	"Exaltation"	3:28
10.	"Tyranny of Want"	3:35
11.	"The Prophecy"	3:37
12.	"And to Posterity a Plague"	3:44

== Personnel ==
=== Neaera ===
- Benjamin Hilleke – Vocals
- Tobias Buck – Guitar
- Stefan Keller – Guitar
- Benjamin Donath – Bass Guitar
- Sebastian Heldt – Drums

=== Credits ===
- Erode – Synthesizer on "The Forging", arranger, composer, Mixing, engineer
- Alexander Dietz – Producer, engineer
- Andy Classes – Drum Engineering
- Paul Celan – Poetry
- Tue Madsen – Mastering, Mixing
- Neaera – Composer, producer
