= A Chaos of Flowers (album) =

Studio album by Big Brave
- Released: April 19, 2024
- Recorded: March and July 2023
- Studio: Machines with Magnets (Pawtucket, Rhode Island, US)
- Genre: Doom metal; post-metal
- Length: 39:56
- Language: English, French
- Label: Thrill Jockey
- Producer: Seth Manchester

Big Brave chronology
Nature Morte (2023)	A Chaos of Flowers (2024)	OST (2025)

A Chaos of Flowers is a 2024 studio album by Canadian doom metal band Big Brave. It has received positive reviews from critics.

== Concept ==
Most album lyrics are based on poems by female poets, selected by Robin Wattie. She notes: “These writers express seemingly similar intense moments of individual experiences, of intimacy and madness. We're alone, and yet, not.”

== Reception ==
According to the review aggregator Metacritic, A Chaos of Flowers received "universal acclaim" based on a weighted average score of 88 out of 100 from 4 critic scores. Gavin Brown of Distorted Sound rated this album an 8 out of 10, stating that the music is "devastating and beautiful" and that the musicians "deliver tender passages which merge with a heartbreaking heaviness that is akin to a something of a religiously cathartic experience". In Exclaim!, Anthony Boire rated A Chaos of Flowers 8 out of 10, calling it "an album that sounds like it's existed since the dawn of time", where "each instrument locking into the monolithic sweep has the effect of a caravan gaining members, and a community building itself up". Remfry Dedman of Metal Hammer gave this album 4.5 out of 5 stars, stating that the band have "transcended their doom metal origins without betraying them and created something truly astonishing and unique in the process". Editors at Pitchfork scored this release 7.8 out of 10, where critic Stuart Berman also wrote that the band built upon its doom metal origins, stating that "this isn't so much doom metal as doomed metal—like 1,000-foot-high sand castles, these songs feel majestic yet ephemeral, as if they could dissolve into the ocean at any moment", with an intensity that comes from not only the musicianship, but lyrics and vocals as well. At Sputnikmusic, jesper rated this release 4.5 out of 5, writing that "it represents the very best of what Big|Brave have to offer: emotion in desolation, destruction in grace".

In a May 31 roundup of the best albums of the year, editors at Exclaim! ranked this 18 and Tom Beedham stating that the band "carve out a standpoint of mental unrest and alienation with a sound as old as time itself". Staff at Consequence of Sound on a June 4 list of the best albums of the year so far at 9, where Sun Noor called it an "abrasive, idiosyncratic sound and deliver a one-of-a-kind sonic experience".

The album was a longlisted nominee for the 2024 Polaris Music Prize.

== Track listing ==
1. "I Felt a Funeral" – 6:03; lyrics based on a poem by Emily Dickinson
2. "Not Speaking of the Ways" – 6:17; lyrics based on a poem by Yosano Akiko
3. "Chanson pour mon ombre" – 3:45; lyrics in French, based on a poem by Renée Vivien
4. "Canon: In Canon" – 5:22
5. "A Song for Marie, part iii" – 3:07; instrumental
6. "Theft" – 5:31; lyrics based on a poem by Esther Popel
7. "Quotidian : solemnity" – 3:55
8. "Moonset" – 5:56; lyrics based on a poem by E. Pauline Johnson

== Personnel ==
Big Brave

- Mathieu Ball – guitar, art, layout, design
- Tasy Hudson – drums, percussion
- Robin Wattie – guitar, vocals

Additional personnel

- Seth Manchester – synthesizer, recording, mixing, production
- Marisa Anderson – guitar on "Canon: In Canon" and "Moonset"
- Tashi Dorji – guitar on "Not Speaking of the Ways" and "Chanson pour mon ombre"
- Heba Kadry – audio mastering
- Patrick Shiroishi – saxophone on "Not Speaking of the Ways" and "Canon: In Canon"

== See also ==
- 2024 in Canadian music
- 2024 in heavy metal music
- List of 2024 albums
