= Let the Tempest Come =

Studio album by Neaera
- Released: April 7, 2006
- Recorded: January 2006
- Studio: Hansen Studios
- Genre: Melodic death metal, metalcore
- Length: 50:42
- Label: Metal Blade
- Producer: Jacob Hansen

Neaera chronology
The Rising Tide of Oblivion (2005)	Let the Tempest Come (2006)	Armamentarium (2007)

Professional ratings
Review scores
Source	Rating
About.com	3.5/5 stars
Allmusic	3/5 stars

Let the Tempest Come is the second studio album by German melodic death metal band Neaera. It was released on 7 April 2006 through Metal Blade Records.

== Track listing ==
All lyrics are written by Keller; all music is composed by Neaera.

No.	Title	Lyrics	Length
1.	"Mechanisms of Standstill"	Donath	3:46
2.	"Let the Tempest Come"		4:15
3.	"Plagueheritage"	Keller, Donath	4:18
4.	"God Forsaken Soil"		4:54
5.	"HeavenHell"		5:47
6.	"Desecrators"		4:46
7.	"The Crimson Void"		5:05
8.	"I Love the World"		4:47
9.	"Paradigm Lost"		5:25
10.	"Life Damages the Living"		2:20
11.	"Scars of Gray"		5:09
Total length:			50:42

Japanese Bonus Track
No.	Title	Length
12.	"The Cleansing Void"	4:09
Total length:		54:51

== Personnel ==
Writing, performance and production credits are adapted from the album liner notes.

Neaera

- Benjamin Hilleke – vocals
- Stefan Keller – guitar
- Tobias Buck – guitar
- Benjamin Donath – bass
- Sebastian Heldt – drums

Guest musicians

- Kevin Otto (End of Days) – vocals on "God-Forsaken Soil"
- Jacob Bredahl (ex-Hatesphere) – vocals on "God-Forsaken Soil"

Production

- Jacob Hansen – recording, mixing, mastering

Artwork and design

- Empty – layout
- Manuel Epker – photography
