= The Rising Tide of Oblivion =

Studio album by Neaera
- Released: 21 March 2005
- Genre: Melodic death metal; metalcore
- Length: 42:36
- Label: Metal Blade
- Producer: Andy Classen

Neaera chronology
The Rising Tide of Oblivion (2005)	Let the Tempest Come (2006)

Professional ratings
Review scores
Source	Rating
Blabbermouth.net	5.5/10
Rock Hard	8/10

The Rising Tide of Oblivion is the first full-length album released by Neaera. It was released on 21 March 2005 by Metal Blade Records.

== Track listing ==
All tracks are written by Neaera.

The Rising Tide of Oblivion track listing
No.	Title	Length
1.	"The World Devourers"	4:32
2.	"Broken Spine"	2:53
3.	"Anthem of Despair"	3:36
4.	"Walls Instead of Bridges"	2:36
5.	"Where Submission Reigns"	4:21
6.	"From Grief..." (instrumental)	0:57
7.	"...to Oblivion"	3:35
8.	"Hibernating Reason"	3:31
9.	"Definition of Love"	3:15
10.	"Save the Drowning Child"	3:27
11.	"Beyond the Gates"	3:10
12.	"No Coming Home"	4:20
13.	"The Last Silence" (instrumental)	2:23
Total length:		42:36

== Personnel ==
Writing, performance and production credits are adapted from the album liner notes.

Neaera

- Benjamin Hilleke – vocals
- Stefan Keller – guitar
- Tobias Buck – guitar
- Benjamin Donath – bass guitar
- Sebastian Heldt – drums

Guest musicians

- Claus Ulka (ex-Misery Speaks) – vocals on "Save the Drowning Child"

Additional musicians

- Magdalena Gerritsen – violin on "From Grief..." and "The Last Silence"
- Sören Krefis – cello on "From Grief..." and "The Last Silence"

Production

- Andy Classen – production, mastering
- Reiner Wyen – production of "From Grief..." and "The Last Silence"

Artwork and design

- Martin Großmann – design
