= Ours Is the Storm =

Studio album by Neaera
- Released: 1 March 2013
- Genre: Melodic death metal; metalcore
- Length: 44:28
- Label: Metal Blade
- Producer: Alexander Dietz

Neaera chronology
Forging the Eclipse (2010)	Ours Is the Storm (2013)	Neaera (2020)

Singles from Ours Is the Storm
- 1. "Ours Is the Storm" Released: 7 January 2023; 2. "Decolonize the Mind" Released: 11 February 2023

Ours Is the Storm is the sixth studio album by German melodic death metal band Neaera. It was released on 1 March 2013 through Metal Blade Records, after the band extended their recording deal with the label. A performance video was made for the single "Decolonize the Mind".

The band promoted the album with a European tour on February and March 2013, supported by Bury Tomorrow and The Defiled. They also performed at Germany's Queens Of Metal Open Air in late August, among various other bands.

== Track listing ==
Ours Is the Storm track listing
No.	Title	Length
1.	"The Deafening"	0:41
2.	"Ours Is the Storm"	3:27
3.	"Decolonize the Mind"	3:27
4.	"Through Treacherous Flames"	4:17
5.	"Ascend to Chaos"	3:58
6.	"Walk with Fire"	3:44
7.	"My Night Is Starless"	3:48
8.	"Black Tomb"	4:41
9.	"Between Us and Annihilation"	3:53
10.	"Slaying the Wolf Within"	4:04
11.	"Back to the Soul"	3:59
12.	"Guardian of Ashes"	4:29
Total length:		44:28

Limited edition bonus tracks
No.	Title	Length
13.	"Skeleton World"	4:01
14.	"Repressed Hate"	3:18
Total length:		51:47

== Personnel ==
=== Neaera ===
- Benjamin Hilleke – vocals
- Tobias Buck – guitar
- Stefan Keller – guitar
- Benjamin Donath – bass guitar
- Sebastian Heldt – drums

=== Credits ===
- Nathan Gray – vocals on "Slaying the Wolf Within"
- Alexander Dietz – producer, mixing
- Tue Madsen – mastering
- Markus Ruf – cover art
- Terje Johnsen – design
- Knax die Hüpfburg – photography

== Charts ==
Chart performance for Ours Is the Storm
Chart (2013)	Peak position
German Albums (Offizielle Top 100)	48
