= Neverbloom =

Studio album by Make Them Suffer
- Released: 25 May 2012
- Genres: Deathcore; metalcore; blackened death metal; symphonic metal
- Length: 46:57
- Label: Roadrunner
- Producer: Roland Lim

Make Them Suffer chronology
Lord of Woe (2010)	Neverbloom (2012)	Old Souls (2015)

Singles from Neverbloom
- 1. "Neverbloom" Released: 2 April 2012; 2. "Widower" Released: 26 April 2012; 3. "Elegies" Released: 17 June 2013

Neverbloom is the debut studio album by Australian metalcore band Make Them Suffer. The album was released on 25 May 2012 through Roadrunner Records and was produced by Roland Lim.

== Critical reception ==
Professional ratings
Review scores
Source	Rating
KillYourStereo	Positive
Loud	85/100

The album received positive reviews from critics. KillYourStereo gave the album a positive review and stated: "Roadrunner Records obviously considered Make Them Suffer worthy of promotion and Neverbloom for what it's worth seemingly justifies this support. Maybe for you Game of Throne lovers, this can be your unofficial soundtrack. Make Them Suffer's name has slowly yet gradually made its way into the local metal vocabulary over the last 12 to 18 months. Neverbloom thankfully highlights that this regard is for adequate reasons." Loud scored the album 85 out of 100 and said: "Overall, Neverbloom is a venomous and unrelenting offering of deathcore mixed with the band's various influences. Make Them Suffer may well become one of the biggest bands in their genre to come out of Australia."

== Track listing ==
No.	Title	Length
1.	"Prologue"	1:39
2.	"Neverbloom"	6:34
3.	"Morrow (Weaver of Dreams)"	3:09
4.	"Elegies"	5:03
5.	"Maelstrom"	6:49
6.	"Oceans of Emptiness"	2:21
7.	"The Well"	3:51
8.	"Weeping Wastelands" (re-recorded version; original version from Lord of Woe)	6:55
9.	"Widower"	4:38
10.	"Chronicles"	5:54
Total length:		46:57

== Personnel ==
Credits adapted from Discogs.

Make Them Suffer

- Sean Harmanis – unclean vocals
- Nick McLernon – lead guitar, backing vocals
- Craig Buckingham – rhythm guitar
- Chris Arias-Real – bass
- Tim Madden – drums
- Louisa Burton – keyboards, piano, clean vocals

Additional personnel

- Roland Lim – production, mixing

== Charts ==
Chart performance for Neverbloom
Chart (2012)	Peak position
Australian Albums (ARIA)	56
