= Ravenous Abyss =

EP by Abysmal Oceans
- Released: June 8, 2024
- Genre: Black metal
- Length: 20:12
- Producer: Usham Demoriel

Abysmal Oceans chronology
Ravenous Abyss (2024)	Invoking the Flesh and Blood (2024)

Ravenous Abyss is the debut EP by Maldivian black metal band Abysmal Oceans, released on June 8, 2024.

Drawing thematic inspiration from Maldivian folklore and fantasy, Ravenous Abyss incorporates a narrative centered around the fictional entity Abysma.

== Lyrical concept and theme ==
The EP features four tracks. Each track contributes to a conceptual storyline depicting Abysma’s influence and impact across time. Abysma is illustrated as an ancient and malevolent force residing beneath the ocean.

=== Dominion ===
This track introduces the domain of Abysma and a cult devoted to serving her. The song describes ritualistic practices aimed at invoking her power, with themes centered around devotion, transformation, and apocalyptic cleansing.

=== Ascension ===
Ascension marks the emergence of Abysma from her underwater dominion. The lyrics and tone reflect the concept of her rising to the surface world, unleashing destruction in her wake.

=== Warmarch ===
This track narrates the passage of time following Abysma’s ascension. It depicts the expansion of her empire and the wars waged in her name, resulting in widespread devastation and a legacy of fear.

=== Nightmares ===
The final track explores the psychological and spiritual aftermath of Abysma's reign. It suggests an ongoing connection between the mortal world and Abysma's realm, where souls are drawn into a state of perpetual torment.

== Track listing ==
No.	Title	Length
1.	"Dominion"	05:47
2.	"Ascension"	03:43
3.	"War March"	05:08
4.	"Nightmares"	05:34
Total length:		20:12

== Personnel ==
Abysmal Oceans

- Usham Demoriel – vocals
- Occultus Monolith – guitars
- Unholy One – bass

Additional personnel

- Krzysztof Klingbein – drums
- Fufoo – lead guitar on "Ascension"
- George Nerantzis – mixing and mastering
