= Worlds Apart (Make Them Suffer album) =

Studio album by Make Them Suffer
- Released: 28 July 2017
- Recorded: 2016–2017
- Studios: Sumo Sound Studios, Perth, Australia; Templeman Audio, Mount Hawthorn, Western Australia
- Genres: Metalcore; symphonic death metal
- Length: 40:41
- Label: Rise
- Producer: Make Them Suffer

Make Them Suffer chronology
Old Souls (2015)	Worlds Apart (2017)	How to Survive a Funeral (2020)

Singles from Worlds Apart
- 1. "Fireworks" Released: 8 June 2017; 2. "Uncharted" Released: 12 July 2017; 3. "Vortex (Interdimensional Spiral Hindering Inexplicable Euphoria)" Released: 15 July 2017; 4. "Save Yourself" Released: 22 July 2017

Worlds Apart is the third studio album by Australian metalcore band Make Them Suffer. The album was released on 28 July 2017 through Rise Records and was self-produced by the band. This is the last album to feature Tim Madden on drums before his official departure from the band in January 2018.

== Background and recording ==
On 9 June 2017, after Chris Arias-Real, Lachlan Monty, and Louisa Burton left the band, Jaya Jeffery was announced as the new bassist and Booka Nile was announced as the new keyboardist to help complete recording.

== Critical reception ==
Professional ratings
Review scores
Source	Rating
Distorted Sound	8/10
Loud	80/100
Louder Sound	3.5/5 stars
New Noise	4.5/5 stars
Wall of Sound	7/10

The album received positive reviews from critics. Distorted Sound scored the album 8 out of 10 and said: "Simply put, Worlds Apart is not a record for deathcore or death metal fans, necessarily. However, fans of the band and of Ether will not be disappointed, as MAKE THEM SUFFER have crafted a solid and consistent record that certainly represents a move in an exciting direction for the band."

Louder Sound gave the album a positive review and stated: "Granted, Worlds Apart is not the frostbitten maelstrom on which MTS established themselves, but any diehards blanching at this record's euphoric eclecticism will certainly find solace among the intermittent flurries of blastbeats and enamel-peeling screams elsewhere. These guys are suffering for their art successfully." New Noise gave the album 4.5 out of 5 and stated: "With Worlds Apart, Make Them Suffer are clearly on another level." Wall of Sound gave the album a score 7/10 and saying: "It's hard to criticise a band for wanting to move forward in their craft. Worlds Apart is without doubt another stepping stone for MTS moving forward and they have unearthed a gem in the creative talents of Booka Nile. The positives far outweight the negatives for this record and I'm more than interested to see what lies ahead for MTS once they work and tour together with this new line up."

== Track listing ==
No.	Title	Length
1.	"The First Movement"	4:45
2.	"Uncharted"	4:52
3.	"Grinding Teeth"	3:44
4.	"Vortex (Interdimensional Spiral Hindering Inexplicable Euphoria)"	3:56
5.	"Fireworks"	4:39
6.	"Contact"	1:48
7.	"Power Overwhelming"	5:13
8.	"Midnight Run"	2:46
9.	"Dead Plains"	4:13
10.	"Save Yourself"	4:42
Total length:		40:41

== Personnel ==
Make Them Suffer

- Sean Harmanis – unclean vocals
- Nick McLernon – guitars, backing vocals, engineering
- Jaya Jeffrey – bass
- Tim Madden – drums
- Booka Nile – keyboards, piano, clean vocals

Additional personnel

- Make Them Suffer – production, arrangement
- Fraser Cringle and Tristan Sturmer – engineering
- Matthew Templeman – vocal engineering
- Forrester Savell – mastering, mixing
- Mike Winkelmann – cover art
- Pat Fox – layout

== Charts ==
Chart (2017)	Peak position
Australian Albums (ARIA)	29
Heatseekers Albums (Billboard)	5
Top Current Albums (Billboard)	91
Independent Albums (Billboard)	17
