= Sean Harmanis (singer) =

Australian singer

- Born: Sean Harmanis; October 22, 1990 (age 35); Perth, Australia
- Genres: Metalcore, Deathcore, Blackened Death Metal, Hard Rock
- Occupations: Singer, songwriter
- Labels: Greyscale, SharpTone, Rise, Roadrunner
- Member of: Make Them Suffer, Onslow

Sean Harmanis is an Australian singer who is the lead vocalist of Australian metalcore band Make Them Suffer.

He co-wrote the song "Epitaph" which won the Most Performed Hard Rock/Heavy Metal Work at the APRA Music Awards of 2025.
