= Omnicide – Creation Unleashed =

Studio album by Neaera
- Released: May 26, 2009
- Recorded: January 2009
- Studio: Rape of Harmonies Studios
- Genre: Melodic death metal, metalcore
- Length: 44:02
- Label: Metal Blade
- Producer: Alexander Dietz, Ralf Müller, Patrick W. Engel

Neaera chronology
Armamentarium (2007)	Omnicide – Creation Unleashed (2009)	Forging the Eclipse (2010)

Omnicide – Creation Unleashed is the fourth studio album by German melodic death metal band Neaera. It was released on 26 May 2009 through Metal Blade Records. The album was recorded at the Rape of Harmonies Studio with producer Alexander Dietz. The artwork was created by Terje Johnsen.

The album entered the German Media Control chart at No. 51.

== Track listing ==
All lyrics are written by Neaera; all music is composed by Neaera.

No.	Title	Length
1.	"I Loathe"	4:34
2.	"Prey to Anguish"	4:36
3.	"The Wretched of the Earth"	3:49
4.	"Grave New World"	4:02
5.	"Age of Hunger"	4:57
6.	"Caesura"	4:21
7.	"Omnicide"	4:22
8.	"In Near Ruins"	4:47
9.	"The Nothing Doctrine"	4:39
10.	"I am the Rape"	4:00
Total length:		44:02

Bonus track
No.	Title	Length
11.	"The Lasting Dose" (Crowbar cover)	4:06

== Personnel ==
Writing, performance and production credits are adapted from the album liner notes.

Neaera

- Benjamin Hilleke – vocals
- Stefan Keller – guitar
- Tobias Buck – guitar
- Benjamin Donath – bass
- Sebastian Heldt – drums

Production

- Alexander Dietz (Heaven Shall Burn) – recording, production
- Ralf Müller – recording, production
- Patrick W. Engel – recording, production
- Zeuss – mixing, mastering

Artwork and design

- theterje.net – artwork

== Chart performance ==
Chart	Peak position
German Albums (Offizielle Top 100)	51
