= Camp Pain =

Studio album by 96 Bitter Beings
- Released: November 28, 2018
- Studio: Manifest Productions (Lake Forest, California)
- Genre: Alternative rock
- Length: 33:38
- Label: Distant
- Producer: Deron Miller; Kenneth Hunter

96 Bitter Beings chronology
Camp Pain (2018)	Synergy Restored (2022)

Singles from Camp Pain
- 1. "What Else Is There" Released: October 23, 2019

Camp Pain is the debut studio album by American rock band 96 Bitter Beings. Produced by the band's lead vocalist Deron Miller and lead guitarist Kenneth Hunter, it was released on November 28, 2018, initially available exclusively to people who contributed to the band's Indiegogo campaign.

== Background ==
After leaving CKY in 2011, vocalist and guitarist Deron Miller reformed Foreign Objects with new lead guitarist Kenneth Hunter and brothers Shaun (bass) and Tim Luera (drums). The band released Galactic Prey in 2015, after which Miller announced the formation of a new band called MechaCKY with the same members. A few months later, the band's name was changed to 96 Bitter Beings (96BB), with an Indiegogo campaign launched to fund the production and release of two recordings: the "contributor-only album" Camp Pain and the follow-up Synergy Restored, the latter of which would receive a full release.

Camp Pain was released to Indiegogo contributors on November 28, 2018. The album was subsequently leaked, at which point Miller arranged for the album to be released on music streaming services. A music video for the song "On and On and On and On and On", directed by former CKY crew member Chris Raab, was released in June 2019. This was followed by a video for "Still Unstable, Still at Large" in October. In January and February 2020, the band promoted Camp Pain on a United States tour, with UK shows initially planned for April that year, although these were cancelled due to the COVID-19 pandemic.

Speaking about the approach to Camp Pain, Miller has explained that the album was intended to serve as a "sampler of all the things that made, to me, all our [CKY's] music interesting in the past", noting that Hunter wrote some of the music while he wrote all of the lyrics. The album's title is a pun based on the word "campaign", reflecting the fact that its production was crowdfunded by fans of the group. Alongside original new compositions, the album also features a cover version of Michael Jackson's "Beat It" (which Miller had previously performed live with CKY) and a new recording of the Foreign Objects track "Megadextria".

== Reception ==
Niki Flynn of V13.net described Camp Pain as "a great record for old fans of CKY or anyone into complex riffage and thought-provoking lyrics layered over a deliciously crisp mix of instrumentation", naming the tracks "Still Unstable, Still at Large", "The Whipping Hands" and "Bugs and Snakes" as highlights.

== Track listing ==
All tracks are written by Deron Miller, except where noted.

No.	Title	Writer(s)	Length
1.	"Try It Again"		0:39
2.	"Still Unstable, Still at Large"		3:34
3.	"The Whipping Hands"		3:33
4.	"Cavalcade of Perversion"		3:46
5.	"Where Were You?"		3:04
6.	"Beat It" (Michael Jackson cover)	Michael Jackson	3:44
7.	"Bugs and Snakes" (Matt Janaitis cover)	Matt Janaitis	3:25
8.	"Megadextria"		3:39
9.	"On and On and On and On and On"		3:26
10.	"December Higher Power"		4:43
Total length:			33:38

LP version bonus tracks
No.	Title	Writer(s)	Length
11.	"What Else Is There" (Röyksopp cover)	Svein Berge; Torbjørn Brundtland	3:37
12.	"No One Hears" (rough mix re-recording)		3:33
Total length:			40:48

== Personnel ==
96 Bitter Beings

- Deron Miller — vocals, rhythm guitar, synthesizers, production, art direction
- Kenneth Hunter – lead guitar, guitar synthesizer, production, engineering, mixing, mastering
- Shaun Luera — bass
- Tim Luera — drums

Additional musicians

- Saman Ali — keyboards, synthesizers, engineering
- Matt "Matty J" Janaitis — bass on "Bugs and Snakes"
- Rob "Murry" Valeno — drums on "Bugs and Snakes"

Additional personnel

- Kyle Salzman — engineering
- Travis Smith — artwork
- Matt Sweeney — layout, design, photography
