= Old Souls (Make Them Suffer album) =

Studio album by Make Them Suffer
- Released: 28 May 2015
- Genre: Deathcore; blackened death metal; progressive metalcore
- Length: 39:58
- Label: Roadrunner
- Producer: Roland Lim

Make Them Suffer chronology
Neverbloom (2012)	Old Souls (2015)	Worlds Apart (2017)

Singles from Old Souls
- 1. "Let Me In" Released: 12 May 2014; 2. "Requiem" Released: 7 April 2015; 3. "Blood Moon" Released: 25 April 2015; 4. "Threads" Released: 5 May 2015

Old Souls is the second studio album by Australian metalcore band Make Them Suffer. The album was released on 28 May 2015 through Roadrunner Records and was produced by Roland Lim.

== Critical reception ==
Professional ratings
Review scores
Source	Rating
KillYourStereo	Positive
New Noise	Positive

The album received positive reviews from critics. KillYourStereo gave the album a positive review and stated: "Make Them Suffer have outdone themselves with Old Souls. The poetic lyrics and story-telling nature of the songs; the driving blast beats that actually drive the songs further; the symphonic and orchestral elements all result in a far more interesting soundscape than just mere chugs, low growls and breakdowns. Old Souls runs at a break neck pace. It is emotionally intense as they come, and its mix and production is top-notch (on ya Roland Lim). Equally, it's also far more layered and textured than most other metal albums out at the moment. There is so much to find and love within the 40 or so minutes that this album dwells within its running time. You would have to be fucking institutionalised and/or lack a solid internet connection to give this one a miss."

New Noise Magazine gave the album a positive review and stated: "The occasional cinematic structure, piano signature, and back-up vocals could be used more often, but they are all (at the least) very helpful in their places of Old Souls. Perhaps, by their third album, Make Them Suffer will have learned to better utilize these strong points. As far as this one goes, Old Souls is a strong enough metalcore release to adequately kill your time for the start of the summer vacation. It could be replaced quickly enough, but returns to it now and then could very well be expected. There's potential to be heard here."

== Track listing ==
No.	Title	Length
1.	"Foreword"	1:55
2.	"Requiem"	4:04
3.	"Fake"	3:00
4.	"Let Me In"	4:32
5.	"Threads"	3:52
6.	"Through the Looking Glass"	2:36
7.	"Blood Moon"	4:10
8.	"Scraping the Barrel"	4:11
9.	"Marionette"	3:19
10.	"Timeless"	3:49
11.	"Old Souls"	4:30
Total length:		39:58

== Personnel ==
Credits adapted from Discogs.

Make Them Suffer

- Sean Harmanis – unclean vocals, additional clean vocals on "Timeless"
- Nick McLernon – lead guitar, backing vocals
- Lachlan Monty – rhythm guitar
- Chris Arias-Real – bass
- Tim Madden – drums
- Louisa Burton – keyboards, piano, clean vocals

Additional personnel

- Roland Lim – production, mixing
- Marlon Ingle – production assistant
- Jason Suecof, Joey Sturgis and Forrester Savell – mixing
- Jay Huxtable – vocal recording

== Charts ==
Chart (2015)	Peak position
Australian Albums (ARIA)	30
