= Mother of Millions (band) =

Greek band

Mother Of Millions
- Origin: Athens, Greece
- Genres: Progressive metal; progressive rock
- Years active: 2008–present
- Labels: ViciSolum Productions; Turkey Vulture Records; Bungalo Records; Universal Music Group Distribution
- Members: George Prokopiou; Kostas Konstantinidis; Panos Priftis; Ektoras Tsolakis
- Past members: Makis Tsamkosoglou; George Boukaouris
- Website: motherofmillionsband.com

Mother Of Millions are a progressive metal band from Athens, Greece. The band were formed in 2008 and have released five studio albums: Human (2014), Sigma (2017), Artifacts (2019), Magna Mater (2024), and T (2026) Their music has been described as progressive metal and progressive rock, incorporating elements of post-rock and alternative metal.

== History ==
=== Formation and Human ===
Mother of Millions were formed in Athens in 2008. The band's early lineup included vocalist George Prokopiou, guitarist Kostas Konstantinidis, bassist Panos Priftis, keyboardist Makis Tsamkosoglou and drummer George Boukaouris. The group released a four-track demo EP in 2011 and subsequently began recording their first full-length album.

The band's debut studio album, Human, was released in 2014. The album established the band's combination of progressive rock and metal with elaborate rhythms and atmospheric elements.

=== Sigma ===
Mother of Millions released their second studio album, Sigma, in 2017 through ViciSolum Productions. The album developed the band's progressive metal sound and incorporated conceptual and thematic elements. In interviews surrounding the band's subsequent work, the members described Sigma as having a strong conceptual and musical connection between its songs.

=== Artifacts ===
The band's third studio album, Artifacts, was released on 22 March 2019 through ViciSolum Productions. The album was described as exploring ideas and emotions as objects with ritual value, while its music incorporated progressive metal, progressive rock and cinematic and post-rock elements.

In June 2019, keyboardist Makis Tsamkosoglou died during a Mother of Millions performance. The band subsequently continued without replacing him.

=== Orbit ===
Following Tsamkosoglou's death, Mother of Millions released the EP Orbit on 6 May 2022 through ViciSolum Productions. The four-track release included original material and a cover of Florence + the Machine's "No Light, No Light". The EP was described as a tribute to Tsamkosoglou and reflected the band's response to his death.

=== Magna Mater ===
Mother of Millions released their fourth studio album, Magna Mater, on 4 October 2024 through ViciSolum Productions. The album contains nine tracks: "Inside", "Feral", "Magna Mater", "Celestial", "Liminal", "The Line", "Halo", "Irae" and "Space".

The album continued the band's progressive metal approach while incorporating atmospheric and post-rock elements. Reviews noted a heavier approach than on some of the band's earlier material.

The Magna Mater recording lineup consisted of George Prokopiou on vocals, Kostas Konstantinidis on guitars, Panos Priftis on bass, and George Boukaouris on drums.

=== T ===
T is the fifth studio album by Mother of Millions. It is scheduled for release on 11 September 2026 through ViciSolum Productions. The album's first single, "The Wound", was released on 17 July 2026, followed by "The Innocent" in August. The album contains ten tracks. Rocking.gr described the album as the follow-up to Magna Mater and reported that its themes include war, death and eternity.

The album's track listing is:

1. "The Wound"
2. "The War"
3. "The Aftermath"
4. "The Innocent"
5. "The Ascent"
6. "As One"
7. "The One"
8. "The Circle"
9. "The Sun"
10. "Death"

This album marked the departure of drummer George Boukaouris, who had been a member of the band since 2008. He was replaced by the album's producer, Ektoras Tsolakis, also known as Hector.d.

== Musical style and influences ==
Mother of Millions have been described as a progressive metal and progressive rock band. Their music incorporates atmospheric, cinematic and post-rock elements alongside heavy guitar riffs, progressive arrangements and prominent vocals. Reviews of Artifacts and Magna Mater have highlighted the contrast between heavier passages and atmospheric sections in the band's music.

The band's albums have also used conceptual themes. Artifacts dealt with ideas and emotions as objects with ritual value, while Magna Mater was presented as a work concerned with emotions and their processing.

== Name ==
The band's name comes from the plant Bryophyllum delagoense also known as 'Mother of Millions'.

== Members ==
=== Current ===
- George Prokopiou – Vocals (2008–present)
- Kostas Konstantinidis – Guitars (2008–present)
- Panos Priftis – Bass (2008–present)
- Ektoras Tsolakis – Drums (2025–present)

=== Former ===
- Makis Tsamkosoglou – keyboards, piano, samples (2008–2019)
- George Boukaouris– drums, percussion (2008–2026)

== Discography ==
- Human (2014) - Turkey Vulture Records / Bungalo Records / Universal Music Group Distribution (US)
- Sigma (2017) - ViciSolum Productions (SE)
- Artifacts (2019) - ViciSolum Productions (SE)
- Orbit [EP] (2022) - ViciSolum Productions (SE)
- Magna Mater (2024) - ViciSolum Productions (SE)
- T (2026)
