= All Is Dust =

Studio album by Neaera
- Released: 28 June 2024
- Genre: Melodic death metal
- Length: 47:43
- Label: Metal Blade
- Producer: Tobias Buck

Neaera chronology
Neaera (2020)	All Is Dust (2024)

Singles from All Is Dust
- 1. "Pacifier" Released: 30 April 2024; 2. "All Is Dust" Released: 28 May 2024

All Is Dust is the eighth studio album by German melodic death metal band Neaera. It was released on 28 June 2024 through Metal Blade Records. Music videos were made for the singles "Pacifier" and the title track.

The cover artwork was created by Giannis Nakos (Oceans of Slumber, Evergrey, Vomitory). The album was mixed and mastered by Kristian Kohle, with recording handled by Long Distance Calling drummer Janosch Rathmer.

== Track listing ==
All Is Dust track listing
No.	Title	Length
1.	"Antidote to Faith"	4:27
2.	"Pacifier"	5:38
3.	"All Is Dust"	4:46
4.	"Swords Unsheathed"	4:39
5.	"Per Aspera"	4:32
6.	"Edifier"	4:50
7.	"In Vain" (Veil cover)	4:50
8.	"Render Fear Powerless"	4:04
9.	"Dividers"	4:59
10.	"Into the Hollow"	4:58
Total length:		47:43

== Personnel ==
=== Neaera ===
- Benjamin Hilleke – vocals, art direction
- Tobias Buck – guitar, producer
- Stefan Keller – guitar
- Benjamin Donath – bass guitar
- Sebastian Heldt – drums

=== Credits ===
- Ben Guddorf – additional guitars on "Pacifier"
- Janosch Rathmer – recording, engineering
- Matthias Lohmöller – recording, engineering on "Render Fear Powerless"
- Kristian Kohle – mixing, mastering
- Daniel Clear – assistant mixing
- Giannis Nakos – cover art

== Charts ==
Chart performance for All Is Dust
Chart (2024)	Peak position
German Albums (Offizielle Top 100)	18
