= How to Survive a Funeral =

Studio album by Make Them Suffer
- Released: 19 June 2020
- Recorded: 2019–2020
- Genre: Symphonic deathcore; djent; metalcore
- Length: 35:14
- Label: Rise; Greyscale
- Producer: Drew Fulk; Jeff Dunne

Make Them Suffer chronology
Worlds Apart (2017)	How to Survive a Funeral (2020)	Make Them Suffer (2024)

Singles from How to Survive a Funeral
- 1. "Erase Me" Released: 19 March 2020; 2. "Drown with Me" Released: 13 April 2020; 3. "Soul Decay" Released: 21 May 2020

How to Survive a Funeral is the fourth studio album by Australian metalcore band Make Them Suffer. The album was released on 19 June 2020. It was produced by Drew Fulk and Jeff Dunne. The album's release date was changed multiple times due to the COVID-19 pandemic. This is also the first album to feature drummer Jordan Mather and the last album to feature keyboardist/vocalist Booka Nile. Metal Hammer named it as the 36th best metal album of 2020.

== Track listing ==
How to Survive a Funeral track listing
No.	Title	Length
1.	"Step One"	1:57
2.	"Falling Ashes"	2:41
3.	"Bones"	3:01
4.	"Drown with Me"	4:02
5.	"Erase Me"	3:44
6.	"Soul Decay"	3:43
7.	"Fake Your Own Death"	2:54
8.	"How to Survive a Funeral"	4:26
9.	"The Attendant"	4:33
10.	"That's Just Life"	4:08
Total length:		35:14

== Personnel ==
Credits adapted from AllMusic.

Make Them Suffer

- Sean Harmanis – unclean vocals, additional clean vocals
- Nick McLernon – guitars, backing vocals
- Jaya Jeffrey – bass
- Jordan Mather – drums
- Booka Nile – keyboards, piano, clean vocals

Production Personnel

- Drew Fulk – production, engineering, drums
- Jeff Dunne – engineering, production

== Charts ==
Chart performance for How to Survive a Funeral
Chart (2020)	Peak position
Australian Albums (ARIA)	17
