= Make Them Suffer (album) =

Studio album by Make Them Suffer
- Released: 8 November 2024
- Recorded: 2022–2023
- Genres: Metalcore; deathcore; djent
- Length: 38:38
- Label: SharpTone
- Producer: Nick McLernon

Make Them Suffer chronology
| How to Survive a Funeral (2020) | Make Them Suffer (2024) |

Singles from Make Them Suffer
- 1. "Doomswitch" Released: 13 October 2022; 2. "Ghost of Me" Released: 10 May 2023; 3. "Epitaph" Released: 7 April 2024; 4. "Oscillator" Released: 8 August 2024; 5. "Managod" Released: 10 October 2024; 6. "Small Town Syndrome" Released: 8 November 2024

Professional ratings
Review scores
| Source | Rating |
|---|---|
| Boolin Tunes | 6/10 |
| Distorted Sound | 6/10 |
| Metal Injection | 7.5/10 |
| Wall of Sound | 8.5/10 |

Make Them Suffer is the fifth studio album by Australian metalcore band Make Them Suffer. The album was released on 8 November 2024 via SharpTone Records. It is their first album with keyboardist/co-lead vocalist Alex Reade.

== Background and promotion ==
The first single for the album, "Doomswitch" was released on 13 October 2022. It marked the debut of Alex Reade, replacing the band's previous keyboardist/vocalist Booka Nile who left earlier that year due to sexual assault allegations. Several more singles were released within the next two years, including "Ghost of Me" and "Epitaph". The release of the single "Oscillator" came with the announcement that the album would be released on 8 November 2024. "Mana God" was the album's last pre-release single, released on 11 October 2024. On the same day as the album's release, a visualizer video was released for "Small Town Syndrome".

The band has toured in between singles' releases; from September to October 2023 in North America with fellow Australian metalcore bands Parkway Drive, Northlane, and The Amity Affliction, at the 2024 Download Festival with fellow Australian metal bands Karnivool, Thy Art Is Murder, and Alpha Wolf, in April 2024 in support of Bring Me the Horizon on their Australian tour alongside Sleep Token and Daine, and from August to September 2024 in Australia with Bury Tomorrow, Spite, and Bloom.

== Composition ==
Musically, Make Them Suffer bears a significant change in style for the band, adding more electronic influences and djent to their usual deathcore and metalcore sound, with riffs played on guitars tuned as low as drop E and heavy use of synth and keytar by Alex Reade in songs such as "Doomswitch". This is also the first album where a keyboardist/vocalist adds screaming vocals.

== Track listing ==
Make Them Suffer track listing
| No. | Title | Lyrics | Music | Length |
|---|---|---|---|---|
| 1. | "The Warning" | Instrumental | Nick McLernon | 1:09 |
| 2. | "Weaponized" | Sean Harmanis; Jordan Mather; McLernon | Harmanis; Mather; McLernon | 3:07 |
| 3. | "Oscillator" | Harmanis | Mather; McLernon; James Wrigley | 4:01 |
| 4. | "Doomswitch" | Harmanis; Mather; McLernon | Harmanis; Mather; McLernon | 4:35 |
| 5. | "Managod" | Harmanis | Mather; McLernon | 3:44 |
| 6. | "Epitaph" | Harmanis; Mather; McLernon; Alex Reade; Jeff Dunne | Harmanis; Mather; McLernon; Reade; Dunne | 3:37 |
| 7. | "No Hard Feelings" | Harmanis | Mather; McLernon | 4:03 |
| 8. | "Venusian Blues" | Harmanis | Mather; McLernon | 2:48 |
| 9. | "Ghost of Me" | Harmanis; Mather; McLernon; Chad Haynes | Harmanis; Mather; McLernon; Haynes | 3:51 |
| 10. | "Tether" | Harmanis | Mather; McLernon | 3:55 |
| 11. | "Small Town Syndrome" | Harmanis | Mather; McLernon | 3:48 |
| Total length: | | | | 38:38 |

== Personnel ==
Make Them Suffer

- Sean Harmanis – unclean vocals, additional clean vocals, vocal production
- Nick McLernon – guitars, backing vocals, music production
- Jaya Jeffrey – bass
- Jordan Mather – drums
- Alex Reade – keyboards, keytar, piano, clean vocals, additional unclean vocals

Additional contributors

- Jeff Dunne – mixing, mastering, engineering, vocal engineering on "Oscillator"
- James Wrigley – additional production on "Oscillator"
- Callan Orr – vocal engineering on "Oscillator", "Doomswitch", and "Ghost of Me"
- Matthew Templeman – vocal engineering on "Doomswitch"

== Charts ==
Chart performance for Make Them Suffer
| Chart (2024) | Peak position |
|---|---|
| Australian Albums (ARIA) | 38 |
