= Abysmal Oceans =

Maldivian black metal band

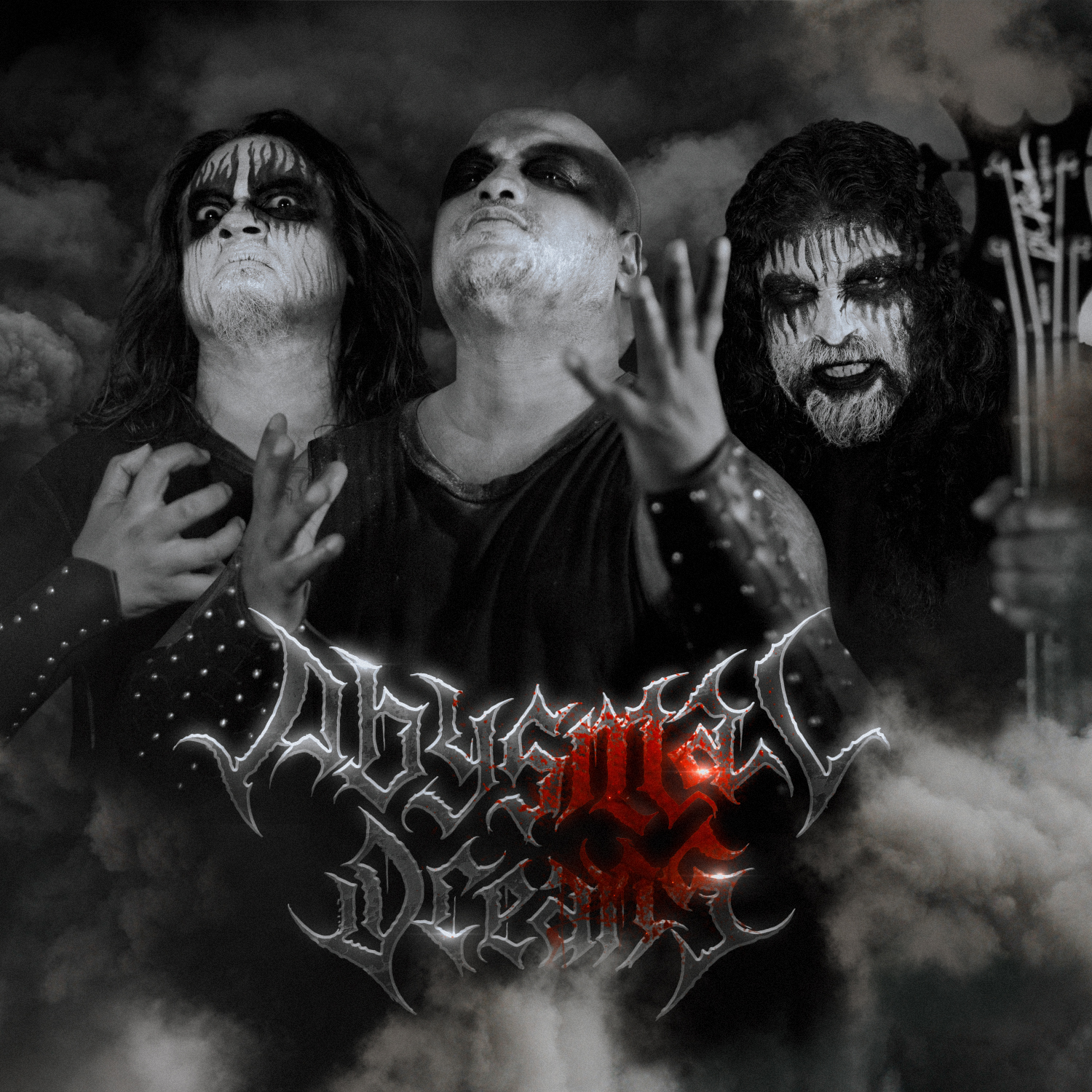

Background information
- Origin: Maldives
- Genres: Black Metal
- Years active: 2023 - Present
- Members: Usham Demoriel; Occultus Monolith; Unholy One
- Website: www.abysmaloceans.com

Abysmal Oceans is a Maldivian based black metal band founded by Occultus Monolith & Unholy One followed by Usham Demoriel. The band's music is influenced by Maldivian folklore and the mysteries of the ocean.

Abysmal Oceans began developing their musical style and writing material in 2023.

== History ==
=== Ravenous Abyss (2024) ===
In 2023, Abysmal Oceans began recording for the EP Ravenous Abyss, a collection of four songs: Dominion, Ascension, War March, and Nightmares.

Composed by Occultus Monolith, Unholy One, and Usham Demoriel, the mixing and mastering were handled by George Nerantzis. While the drum duties were handled by Krzysztof Klingbein, the song Ascension features a guest appearance by Fufoo. The EP was produced by Usham Demoriel.

The EP presents a concept narrative centered around Abysma, an oceanic entity. Each of the four tracks contributes to a storyline involving her emergence, reign, and influence. Ravenous Abyss was released on 8 June 2024, to observe World Ocean Day.

=== Invoking the Flesh and Blood (2024) ===
The single Invoking the Flesh & Blood serves as a prequel to the narrative introduced in the Ravenous Abyss EP, exploring the origin of Abysma. The track references Baravel, an ancient entity that once devastated the shores of the Maldives, providing context for Abysma’s emergence.

This song features Boduberu a Maldivian traditional percussion instrument deeply rooted in Maldivian history.

== Musical style and genre ==
Abysmal Oceans combines elements of black metal with thematic influences drawn from Maldivian cultural and musical traditions. This fusion is described as "True Maldivian Black Metal".

The band’s lyrical theme centers on the fictional entity Abysma, depicted as a powerful oceanic force associated with destruction and conquest.

The concept explores her birth through the life force of Baravel, referencing a mythical storytelling that reflects the band's regional heritage.

== Band members ==
=== Current ===
- Usham Demoriel - Vocals
- Occultus Monolith - Guitars
- Unholy One - Bass

== Discography ==
=== Extended Play ===
Year	Title	Details	Mixed & Mastered	Producer
2024	Ravenous Abyss	• Released: June 8, 2024	George Nerantzis	Usham Demoriel

=== Singles ===
Year	Title	Details	Mixed & Mastered	Producer
2024	Invoking the Flesh & Blood	• Released: December 30, 2024	George Nerantzis	Usham Demoriel
