= Paysage d'Hiver =

Swiss black metal band

- Official logo

Background information
- Origin: Schwarzenburg, Switzerland
- Genres: Ambient black metal; dark ambient
- Years active: 1997–present
- Label: Kunsthall Produktionen
- Members: Wintherr
- Website: kunsthall.ch/artists/paysage-dhiver

Paysage d'Hiver (en: "Winter Landscape") is an ambient black metal project from Burgdorf, Switzerland, formed in 1997 by sole member Tobias 'Winther' Möckl, who is also the frontman of Darkspace under the name Wroth. Möckl has cited the Burzum albums Hvis lyset tar oss and Filosofem, among others, as inspirations. Kunsthall Produktionen, which is ran by Möckl alongside his wife, has released all Paysage d'Hiver material.

The project's releases tell the ongoing story of a wanderer journeyeing through "Paysage d'Hiver", from which the project takes its name. The cover art of each release reflects the respective chapter in the wanderer's journey.

== Musical style ==
Paysage d'Hiver's music is known for its extremely lo-fi, raw production style, while musically it tends to alternate between (and even merge) ambient black metal and pure ambient music—at times also incorporating elements of funeral doom metal, dungeon synth, drone and sound collage, particularly in its earlier outputs. Wintherr plays every instrument, and tends to alternate between acoustic and programmed drums based on what he believes best suits the work at hand. The production style is also a deliberate artistic decision by Wintherr as "the atmosphere is the most important aspect."

== Discography ==
All releases after the Steineiche CD-R were originally exclusively released on cassette and limited to 200 copies each, but were later re-released on CD in unlimited quantities. Schattengang, Die Festung and Paysage d'Hiver have also been released on vinyl, each limited to 300 copies. On the highly limited nature of the cassette and vinyl releases, Wintherr stated he considers them to be "collector's items" whereas the CD versions are to facilitate wider audiences' access to the music.

=== Albums ===
- Steineiche (1998)
- Schattengang (1998)
- Die Festung (1998)
- Kerker (1999)
- Paysage d'Hiver (1999)
- Kristall & Isa (2000)
- Winterkälte (2001)
- Nacht (2004)
- Einsamkeit (2007)
- Das Tor (2013)
- Im Wald (2020)
- Geister (2021)
- Die Berge (2024)

=== EPs ===
- Im Traum (2020)

=== Singles ===
- "Schnee (IV)" (2017)
- "Das Gletschertor" (2020), originally released in 2002
- "Das schwarze Metall-Eisen" (2020), originally released in 1998
- "Schwarzä Feus & Schwarzäs Isä" (2020), originally released in 2004 as separate tracks
- "Im Winterwald" (2020)
- "Bluet" (2021)
- "Äschä" (2021)
- "Schtampfä" (2021)
- "Urgrund" (2024)
- "Verinnerlichung" (2024)

=== Splits ===
- Schnee / Das Winterreich (2003), split with Vinterriket
- Paysage d'Hiver / Lunar Aurora (2004), split with Lunar Aurora
- Десь блукає журба (Somewhere Sadness Wanders) / Schnee (IV) (2017), split with Drudkh
- Paysage d'Hiver / Nordlicht (2017), split with Nordlicht

=== Compilations ===
- Das Gletschertor / Das schwarze Metall-Eisen (2020)
- Schnee (2020)

=== Compilation appearances ===
- "Schnee" on Wurzelgeister (Ketzer Records, 2002)
- "Gletschertor" on D.S.T. – Deutsche Schwarze Tonträgerkunst (Westwall Produktion, 2002)
- "Gletschertor" (tonally improved version) on Schneesturm (Black Metal Mafia, 2003)

== Personnel ==
- Wintherr – vocals, guitars, bass, keyboards, drums, drum programming, violin, samples (since 1997)
