= Orpheus Omega =

Australian melodic death metal band

- Origin: Melbourne, Australia
- Genre: Melodic death metal
- Years active: 2008–present
- Label: EVP Recordings
- Members: Chris Themelco; Luke Ashley; Campbell Hill; Matt Themelco; Leon Monaco
- Past members: Adam "Milky" Adams; Sasha Braganca; Daniel Ralph; Nathan Mesiti; Theo Goslett; Joao Goncalves; Olive Keswick Gallagher
- Website: orpheusofficial.com

Orpheus Omega are a melodic death metal band from Melbourne, Australia. Originally called Orpheus, the band changed their name to Orpheus Omega on April 26, 2013, prior to the release of their second studio album Resillusion. The current line up consists of Chris Themelco (vocals & lead guitar), Luke Ashley (guitar), Campbell Hill (keyboards and backing vocals), Leon Monaco (bass) and Matt Themelco (drums). Their most recent album, Wear Your Sins was released in March 2019. To date, the band has released four studio albums, one EP and two live DVDs

== History ==
=== Formation and early history ===
Founded in Melbourne in 2008 as Orpheus, the band released a six track EP, So it Begins in 2009. Citing Scandinavian bands such as Dark Tranquillity, Children of Bodom, Vitas and Arch Enemy as influences, So it Begins received favourable reviews and the band opened for Amon Amarth on the Melbourne date of their Australian tour on 27 November 2009.

=== Bleed the Way (2010–2013) ===
Recorded during 2010, Orpheus released their debut full-length album Bleed the Way on 18 February 2011 through Rock Star Records. The album featured guest vocals by Ville Viljanen of Mors Principium Est on the track Winds of Change. Bleed the Way received positive reviews, with Metal Obsession citing the album as a contender for best Australian album of 2011. Before the release of the debut album keyboardist Sasha Braganca parted ways with the band, keyboardist Olive Keswick Gallagher joined the band for the debut album release and tour.

=== Resillusion (2013–2015) ===
Orpheus announced on 26 April 2013 that they would be changing their name to Orpheus Omega in order to prevent potential copyright issues overseas.

On 3 May 2013, Orpheus Omega announced the sudden death of bassist Adam "Milky" Adams, just one day before the release of their second full-length album, Resillusion. Deciding to continue as a band, Daniel Ralph took over bass duties for the upcoming tour in support of the new album. He was unveiled as the permanent bassist later the same year in November 2013.

Building upon the success of Bleed the Way, Resillusion received positive reviews featuring in Metal Obsession Albums of the Year.

The tour in support of the album began with a national tour from July 2013 onwards, playing with fellow Australians Ne Obliviscaris and Psycroptic as well as international acts Eluveitie, Korpiklaani and Sirenia.

2014 saw Orpheus Omega support Dark Tranquillity nationally and Children of Bodom in Melbourne and also embarking on their first international tour. Playing in Singapore, China, Taiwan, Hong Kong and Korea, the performances were recorded and released as part of a live DVD Archways Across Asia on 3 November 2014. Production of the DVD itself having been funded by a successful crowdfunding campaign.

Orpheus Omega parted ways with bassist Daniel Ralph on 24 October, his replacement, Nathan Mesiti, being unveiled two days later on 26 October 2014.

=== Partum Vita Mortem (2015–2017) ===
February 2015 saw the band enter the studio to begin recording their third album. In April, Orpheus Omega signed to Kolony Records and announced that the new album would be released in July. A lead single, Beacons was released on 26 May 2015 and the album Partum Vita Mortem was released on 24 July 2015.

A concept album, Partum Vita Mortum consists of three sections each with four songs discussing birth, life and death. The album received positive reviews, with Dead Rhetoric commenting that "Partum Vita Morta [sic] offers up everything that is right and true about melodic death metal."

Orpheus Omega embarked on a national tour of Australia in support of the new album between July and November 2015, which also included opening for At the Gates in October 2015. The band also supported Soilwork in February 2016 and Trivium throughout Australia in April 2016 and Eluveitie in Adelaide in May 2016. A second overseas tour of Asia supporting Insomnium was announced for May 2017, with the band scheduled to appear China and Hong Kong and later in Australia. However, due to alleged problems with working visas, the show in Hong Kong was cancelled.

The band have also released videos for the tracks Karma Favours the Weak, Tomorrow's Fiends and Yesterday's Ghosts and Echoes Through Infinity which form a trilogy of videos from Partum Vita Mortem.

=== Wear Your Sins (2019) ===
Orpheus Omega on stage in Tokyo (April 6th, 2019)

After signing to EVP Recordings in December 2018, their fourth studio album, entitled Wear Your Sins, was released on March 29, 2019, produced by Mark Lewis. Lewis has previously worked with international acts such as Unearth, Trivium and The Black Dahlia Murder.

Wear Your Sins has received positive reviews and the band announced show in Japan and Australia with Omnium Gatherum and Scar Symmetry in support of the new album. These shows being the first time that Orpheus Omega had played in Japan, after the Australian tour, Nathan Mesiti parted ways with Orpheus Omega.

=== Emberglow ===
On 31 May 2024, the band announced their new album, Emberglow, would be released on 26 July.

== Members ==
=== Current members ===
- Chris Themelco (vocals and lead guitar)
- Luke Ashley (guitar)
- Campbell Hill (keyboards and backing vocals)
- Leon Monaco (bass)
- Matt Themelco (drums)

=== Past members ===
- Nathan Mesiti (bass, 2014-2019)
- Sasha Braganca (keyboards, 2008-2010)
- Adam "Milky" Adams (bass, 2008-2013)
- Daniel Ralph (bass, 2013-2014)
- Joao Goncalves (guitar, 2008-2022)
- Olive Keswick Gallagher (keyboard and Backing vocals, (2010-2024)

== Discography ==
=== Extended plays and studio albums ===
Year	Album details	Notes
2009	So it Begins...: Released: 3 July 2009; Label: Independent	EP; Released as Orpheus
2011	Bleed The Way: Released: 18 February 2011; Label: Rockstar Records	Studio Album; Released as Orpheus
2013	Resillusion: Released: 4 May 2013; Label: Rockstar Records	Studio Album; First release as Orpheus Omega
2015	Partum Vita Mortem: Released: 24 July 2015; Label: Kolony Records	Studio Album
2019	Wear Your Sins: Release Date: 29 March 2019; Label: EVP Recordings	Studio Album
2024	Emberglow: Release Date: 26 July 2024; Label: WormholeDeath	Studio Album

=== Live videos ===
Year	Video details	Notes
2013	Live: Released: 15 January 2013; Label: Independent; Format: DVD	Limited Edition
2014	Archways Across Asia: Released: 3 November 2014; Label: Independent; Format: DVD	Recorded live in Singapore, China, Hong Kong, Taiwan and Korea
