= Darkspace (band) =

Swiss black metal band

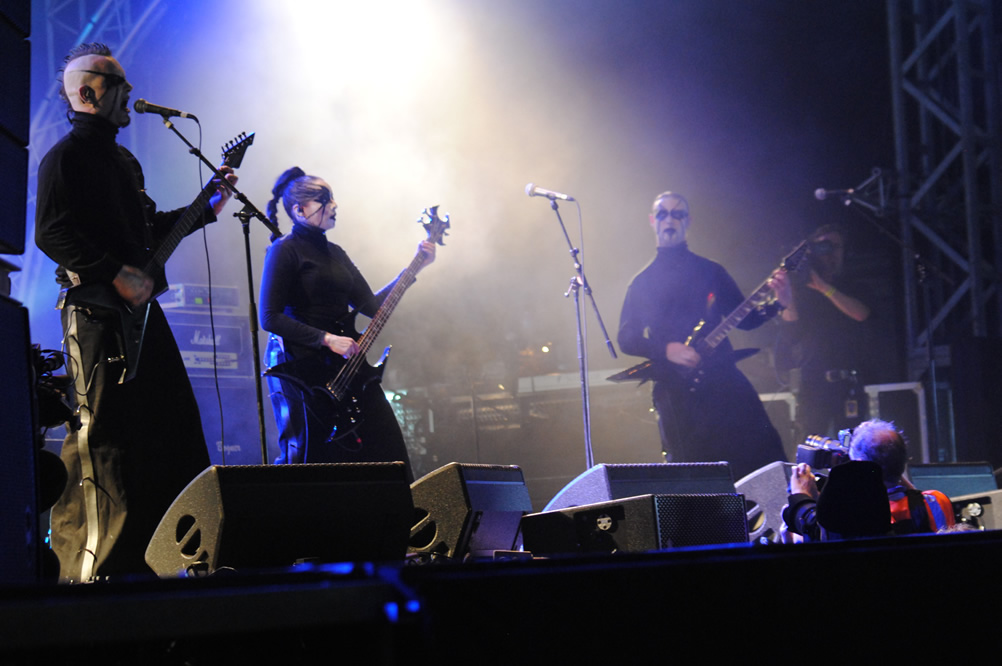
- Darkspace at Hellfest 2012. Left to right: Wroth, Zorgh, Zhaaral.

Background information
- Origin: Bern, Switzerland
- Genres: Ambient black metal; atmospheric black metal
- Years active: 1999–present
- Labels: Season of Mist; Avantgarde Music; Haunter of the Dark
- Members: Wroth; Zhaaral; Yhs
- Past members: Zorgh
- Website: darkcyberspace.com

Darkspace is a Swiss ambient black metal band from Bern, considered to be a pioneer of the cosmic subset therein.

Their lyrical themes revolve around space, darkness and cosmic mysticism, and their music sporadically features isolated samples from space-themed films such as 2001: A Space Odyssey, Event Horizon, Alien and Terminator 2: Judgment Day.

The band does not title their works; each album is titled Dark Space, differentiated only by a subsequent Roman numeral or tally mark indicating order of release—and likewise, each track is titled "Dark" followed by two digits that represent the album number and discography-wise track number respectively, which are separated by a decimal point. As an example, "Dark 3.16" is the sixth track on Dark Space III but is their sixteenth overall piece. However, the band's fourth album is titled Dark Space III I rather than Dark Space IV; their fifth is Dark Space -II, its sole track being -2.2, which continues the numbering from their Dark Space -I demo.

To complement the nature of their works, the band's album covers follow a consistent and minimalistic pattern as well in that their sole features are the band's logo on the top-center, a gray rectangle near the bottom-right (which varies in size, shape and position) framing vague and ethereal grayscale artwork unique to each release, and a pitch-black background. Season of Mist's reissues replace this format with re-imaginings of the framed artworks.

== Biography ==
Darkspace is a trio from Switzerland founded in 1999 by musicians Wroth (Paysage d'Hiver), Zorgh (Apokryphon) and Zhaaral (Sun of the Blind). Wroth, an alias of Tobias Möckl, is currently the only identified member. After independently releasing the demo Dark Space −I in 2002, they released their debut album Dark Space I under Haunter of the Dark in 2003 and in a limited edition of 500 Digipak CDs, which was then remastered and re-released in 2006 by Avantgarde Music.

In 2005, they released Dark Space II. Originally released in 2003 and 2005 respectively by Haunter of the Dark and now sold out, Darkspace's I and II are now owned up by Avantgarde Music and have been reissued in minimalistic card-covered packages.

Darkspace released their third album Dark Space III on 30 May 2008. It was apparently recorded in an underground shelter.

On 12 February 2011, Darkspace announced they would be releasing a re-recording and mixing of their 2002 demo Dark Space −I. It was released in gatefold embossed vinyl and CD in 2012, on 6 and 12 June respectively.

They announced the release of a fourth album via Morse code, which revealed that the album would be out in September 2014. On 8 August, the album title, cover, and release date were confirmed by the band's record label. Dark Space III I was released on 6 September.

Zorgh left the band in 2019, and the band was thereafter one of the four recipients of the Berner Musikpreis in October 2019. The remaining members then left their label Avantgarde Music in July 2021 before signing up on Season of Mist in January 2022, who reissued their discography with new album art and vinyl remasters.

Subsequently, a new member under the pseudonym of simply "Yhs"—who is, as of now, entirely anonymous and unseen—took Zorgh's place as bassist no later than October 2022. They released their fifth album, titled Dark Space -II, on 16 February 2024.

== Personnel ==
Current

- Wroth – lead vocals, rhythm guitar, synths, drum programming (since 1999)
- Zhaaral – lead guitar, backing vocals (since 1999)
- Yhs – bass, backing vocals (since 2022)

Former

- Zorgh – bass, backing vocals (1999–2019)

== Discography ==
=== Studio albums ===
- Dark Space I (2003)
- Dark Space II (2005)
- Dark Space III (2008)
- Dark Space III I (2014)
- Dark Space -II (2024)

=== Demos ===
- Dark Space −I (2002, 2012 [re-recording])
