= Attacker (band) =

American heavy metal band

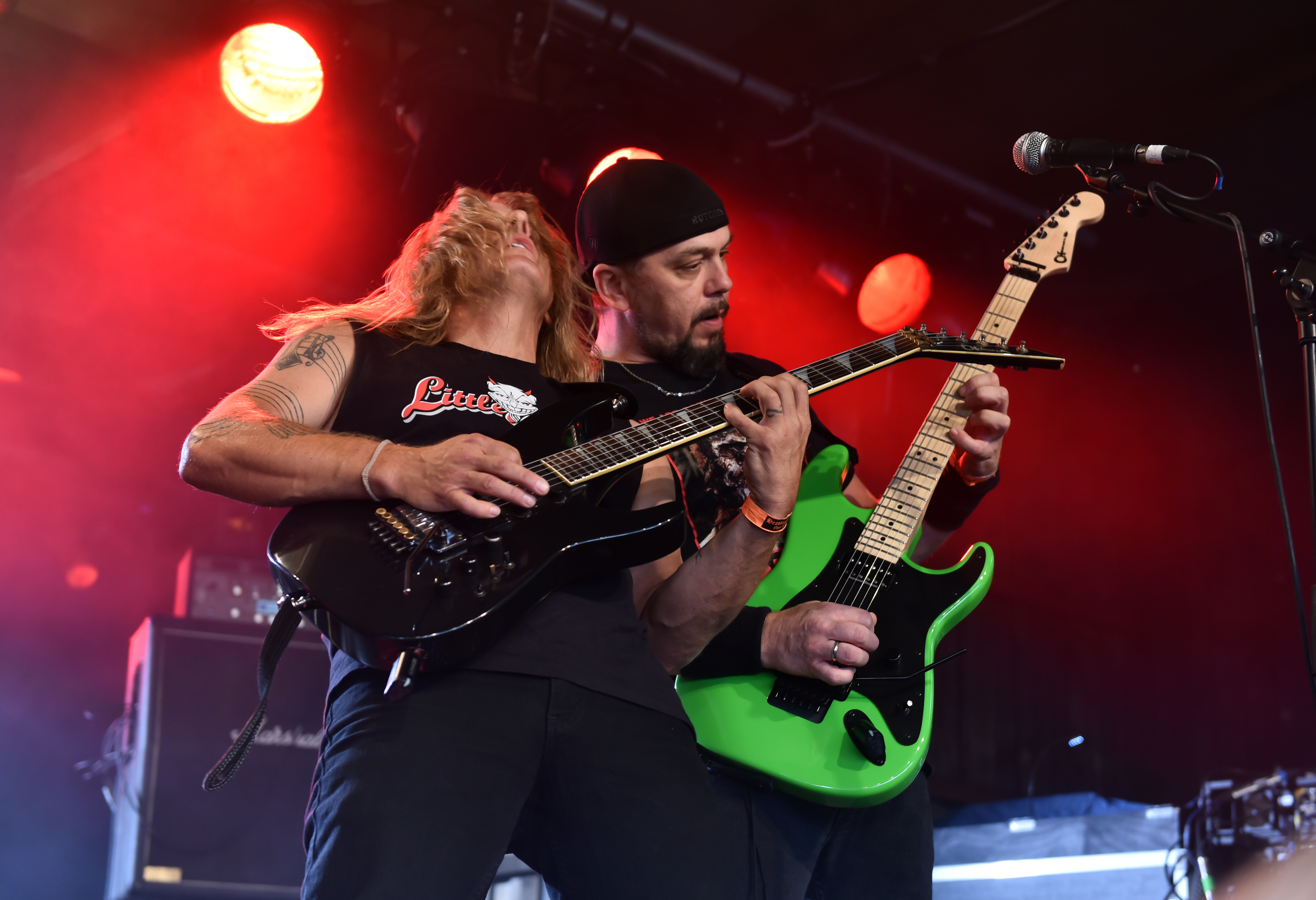
- Attacker performing in 2017

Background information
- Origin: Weehawken, New Jersey, U.S.
- Genres: Heavy metal; speed metal; power metal
- Years active: 1983–1989; 2001–present
- Label: Metal on Metal Records
- Members: Mike Sabatini; Mike Benetatos; Bobby Lucas; Brian Smith; Jon Hasselbrink
- Past members: Lou Ciarlo; John Joseph; Jimmy Schulman; Jim Mooney; Pat Marinelli; Bob Mitchell; Tom D'Amico; John Leone; Felix Torres; Walter Figueroa; Anthony Cross; Jon Hanemann

Attacker is an American heavy metal band from New Jersey. Formed in 1983 under the name Warloc, they changed their name to Attacker the following year. They are best known for their 1985 debut album Battle at Helms Deep, released through Metal Blade Records. They have since released six more full-length albums, most recently in 2016 with Metal on Metal Records.

== Members ==
=== Current members ===
- Mike Sabatini – drums (1984–1989, 2001–present)
- Mike Benetatos – guitar (2001–present)
- Bobby Lucas – vocals (2012–present)
- Brian Smith – bass (2014–present)
- Jon Hasselbrink – guitar (2016–present)

=== Former members ===
- Lou Ciarlo – bass (1984–1989, 2001–2002, 2005–2012)
- Jim Mooney – guitar (1984–1986; died 2000)
- Pat Marinelli – guitar (1984–1989, 2001–2016)
- Bob Mitchell – vocals (1984–1986, 2001–2009)
- Tom D'Amico – guitar (1986–1989; died 2001)
- John Leone – vocals (1986–1989; died 1994)
- Felix Torres – bass (2002–2005)
- Anthony Cross – vocals (2010–2012)
- Jon Hanemann – bass (2012–2014)

== Discography ==
=== Albums ===
- 1985: Battle at Helms Deep (Metal Blade)
- 1988: The Second Coming (Mercenary)
- 2004: Soul Taker (Iron Glory)
- 2006: The Unknown (Sentinel Steel)
- 2007: Standing the Test of Time (Chavis)
- 2013: Giants of Canaan (Metal on Metal)
- 2016: Sins of the World (Metal on Metal)
- 2024: The God Particle (Cruz del Sur)
