= 96 Bitter Beings =

American metal band

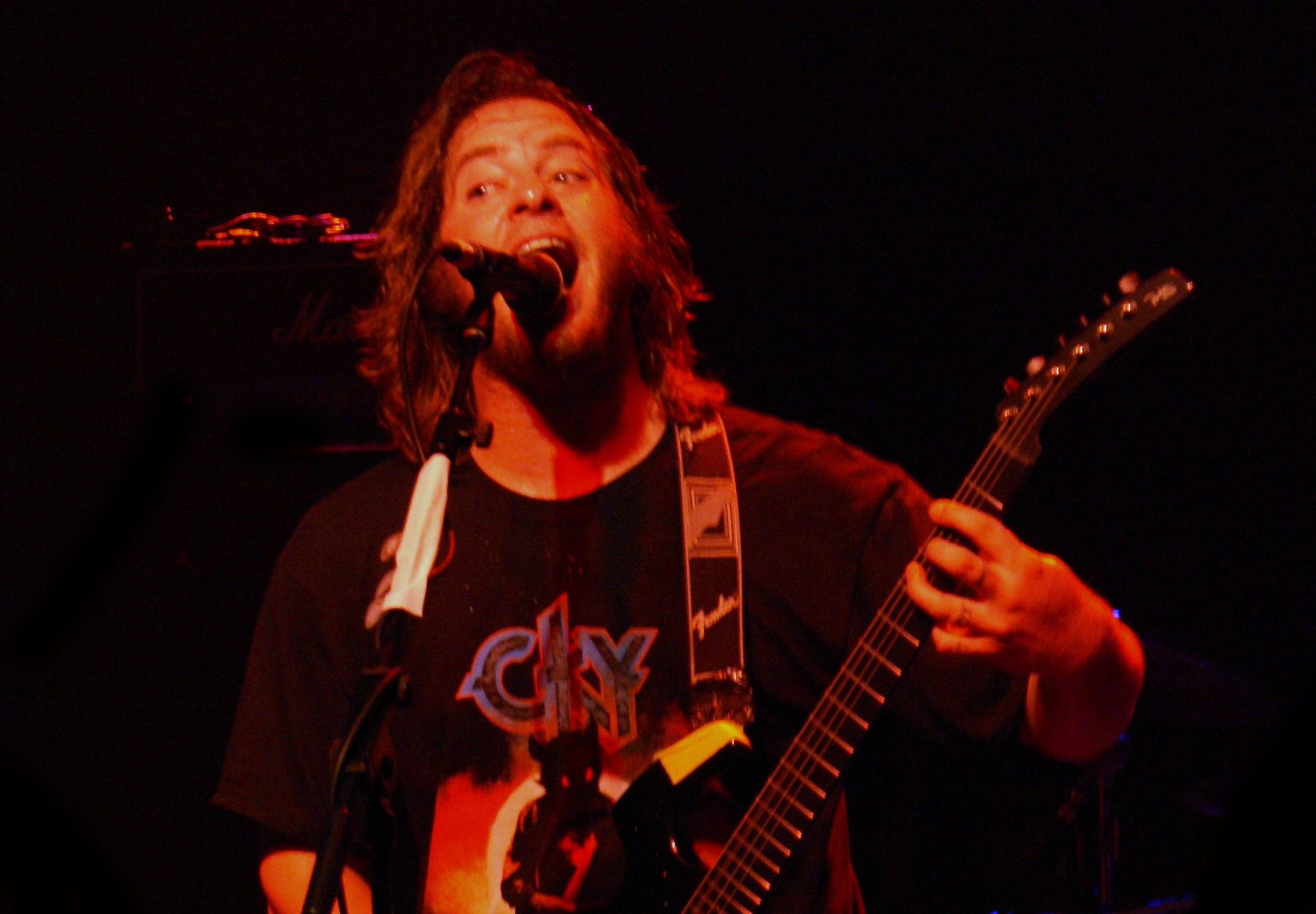
- Frontman Deron Miller performing in 2009

Background information
- Also known as: MechaCKY
- Origin: Los Angeles, California, U.S.
- Genres: Alternative metal
- Years active: 2016–present
- Labels: Nuclear Blast; Distant
- Spinoff of: CKY; Foreign Objects
- Members: Deron Miller; Tuomas Vuorio; Cameron Dewald; Tyler Sturgill
- Past members: Kenneth Hunter; Shaun Luera; Tim Luera; Matty Janaitis
- Website: 96bitterbeings.com

96 Bitter Beings (abbreviated 96BB) is an American alternative metal band from Los Angeles. Formed in 2016 by former CKY frontman Deron Miller, the group was originally known as MechaCKY and intended to serve as the vocalist and guitarist's own continuation of the group following his departure in 2011. Miller completed the band's initial lineup with the same three members as had been in the relaunched Foreign Objects – lead guitarist Kenneth Hunter, bassist Shaun Luera and drummer Tim Luera. Later that year, MechaCKY was renamed 96 Bitter Beings, after the CKY song "96 Quite Bitter Beings".

After a successful crowdfunding campaign, 96 Bitter Beings released the first of two planned albums in 2018, Camp Pain, to those who contributed to the campaign. The band signed with Nuclear Blast in 2022 and released the second album Synergy Restored at the end of the year. Prior to the album's release, the Luera brothers suddenly left the group just before a live show. They were replaced by Matty Janaitis (formerly of CKY) on bass and Tuomas Vuorio on drums. In May 2023, Hunter also announced that he was leaving the band, blaming Miller for the breakup of the original lineup. Janaitis has since left the band as well.

== History ==
=== 2016–2022: Background, formation and Camp Pain ===
After leaving CKY in 2011, Deron Miller took a brief hiatus from the music industry, before releasing Acoustified! in 2013 and reforming Foreign Objects in 2014, with whom he released Galactic Prey the following year. Miller and his bandmates in the relaunched Foreign Objects – lead guitarist Kenneth Hunter, bassist Shaun Luera and drummer Tim Luera – performed a series of shows in the summer of 2015 under the name "Deron Miller's CKY + Foreign Objects", indicating the frontman's intention to continue using the CKY name in some manner in the future. By October, the group had been renamed MechaCKY, with Miller revealing plans for a re-recording of CKY's 2005 third studio album An Answer Can Be Found. In early 2016, Miller officially confirmed plans for new material by MechaCKY, starting with a "rough mix" of the track "Conditioned or Unconditional" which was released on SoundCloud in February.

Later in 2016, MechaCKY was relaunched under the moniker 96 Bitter Beings, named after the opening song and lead single from CKY's 1999 debut album Volume 1, with a crowdfunding campaign launched for the production of two albums – Camp Pain (planned to be an exclusive for those who contributed to the campaign) and Synergy Restored (a full release). In a 2022 interview with Metal Injection, Miller explained that "both of those records were recorded around the same time. It was just the act of dividing them into two different records, according to how they should have been prepared and completed". In March 2018, 96 Bitter Beings released the second song from the upcoming albums, "Throw Yourself Inside". Camp Pain was released in November, followed in June 2019 by a music video for the track "On and On and On" directed by Chris Raab. The band embarked on a North American headline tour in January and February 2020.

=== 2022–present: Synergy Restored and Return to Hellview ===
In May 2022, it was announced that the band had signed with Nuclear Blast for the "long-awaited" release of Synergy Restored, which was predicted for later the same year. The band also announced another North American tour between July and August, supported by Howling Giant. Just before the tour started, however, Tim Luera had to undergo surgery for a "chronic medical issue" which left him unable to perform; he was replaced by Matt "Matty J" Janaitis, former touring bassist and keyboardist for CKY. July also saw the release of a new music video for "Vaudeville's Revenge", the opening track on Synergy Restored, directed again by Raab. This was followed by "Wish Me Dead" in August and "Fire Skyline" in October, before the album came out in November.

Shortly after the release of Synergy Restored, the Luera brothers suddenly left the band; they were replaced by Janaitis on bass and Tuomas Vuorio on drums. In May 2023, Hunter also announced that he was leaving 96 Bitter Beings, writing on the band's Facebook page that "Like Shaun and Tim ... I am leaving for the sole reason of Deron's personality outweighing every positive thing there could be about this band. It was the nightmarish hell that intoxicated Deron brought to our life night after night. Causing constant distress to everyone in the band, including those working on the road for the band. Seemingly no different than what occurred with CKY." In June 2024, 96BB released Return to Hellview, which featured re-recordings of several CKY songs.

== Members ==
Current members

- Deron Miller – lead vocals, rhythm guitar, keyboards (2016–present), lead guitar (2023–2025), bass (2024–2025)
- Tuomas Vuorio – drums (2022–present)
- Cameron Dewald – bass, backing vocals (2025–present)
- Tyler Sturgill — lead guitar (2025–present)

Former members

- Kenneth Hunter – lead guitar, keyboards (2016–2023)
- Shaun Luera – bass, backing vocals (2016–2022)
- Tim Luera – drums (2016–2022, died 2026)
- Matty Janaitis – bass, backing vocals (2022–2024), drums (2022)

== Discography ==
- Camp Pain (2018)
- Synergy Restored (2022)
- Return to Hellview (2024)
