= Big Brave =

Canadian heavy metal band

- Origin: Montreal, Quebec, Canada
- Genres: Experimental, drone doom, post-metal, doom metal
- Years active: 2012–present
- Labels: Thrill Jockey, Southern Lord
- Members: Robin Wattie; Mathieu Ball; Tasy Hudson; Liam Andrews
- Past members: Louis-Alexandre Beauregard
- Website: www.bigbrave.ca

Big Brave (stylized as BIG | BRAVE) is a Canadian experimental metal band formed in Montreal in 2012. The band consists guitarist/vocalist Robin Wattie, guitarist Mathieu Ball, and drummer Tasy Hudson.

== History ==
Wattie and Ball are original members of Big Brave who previously played together as an acoustic, folk oriented duo before they formed Big Brave. Hudson joined them in 2019, replacing original drummer Louis-Alexandre Beauregard.

Big Brave have released nine studio albums, the latest being 2026's In Grief or in Hope and one collaborative album recorded with The Body in 2021, Leaving None but Small Birds.

They have been three-time Polaris Music Prize nominees, with longlist nods at the 2021 Polaris Music Prize for Vital, the 2023 Polaris Music Prize for nature morte, and the 2024 Polaris Music Prize for A Chaos of Flowers.

== Band members ==
=== Current ===
- Robin Wattie – guitars, vocals (2012–present)
- Mathieu Ball – guitars (2012–present)
- Liam Andrews – bass (2026–present, touring 2024-2026)

=== Former ===
- Louis-Alexandre Beauregard — drums (2012–2018)
- Tasy Hudson – drums (2019–2026, on hiatus)

== Discography ==
=== Studio albums ===
- Feral Verdure (2014)
- Au De La (2015)
- Ardor (2017)
- A Gaze Among Them (2019)
- Vital (2021)
- Leaving None but Small Birds (2021, with The Body)
- Nature Morte (2023)
- A Chaos of Flowers (2024)
- OST (2025)
- In Grief or in Hope (2026)

==== EP ====
- An Understanding Between People (2012)
