= Make Them Suffer =

Australian metalcore band

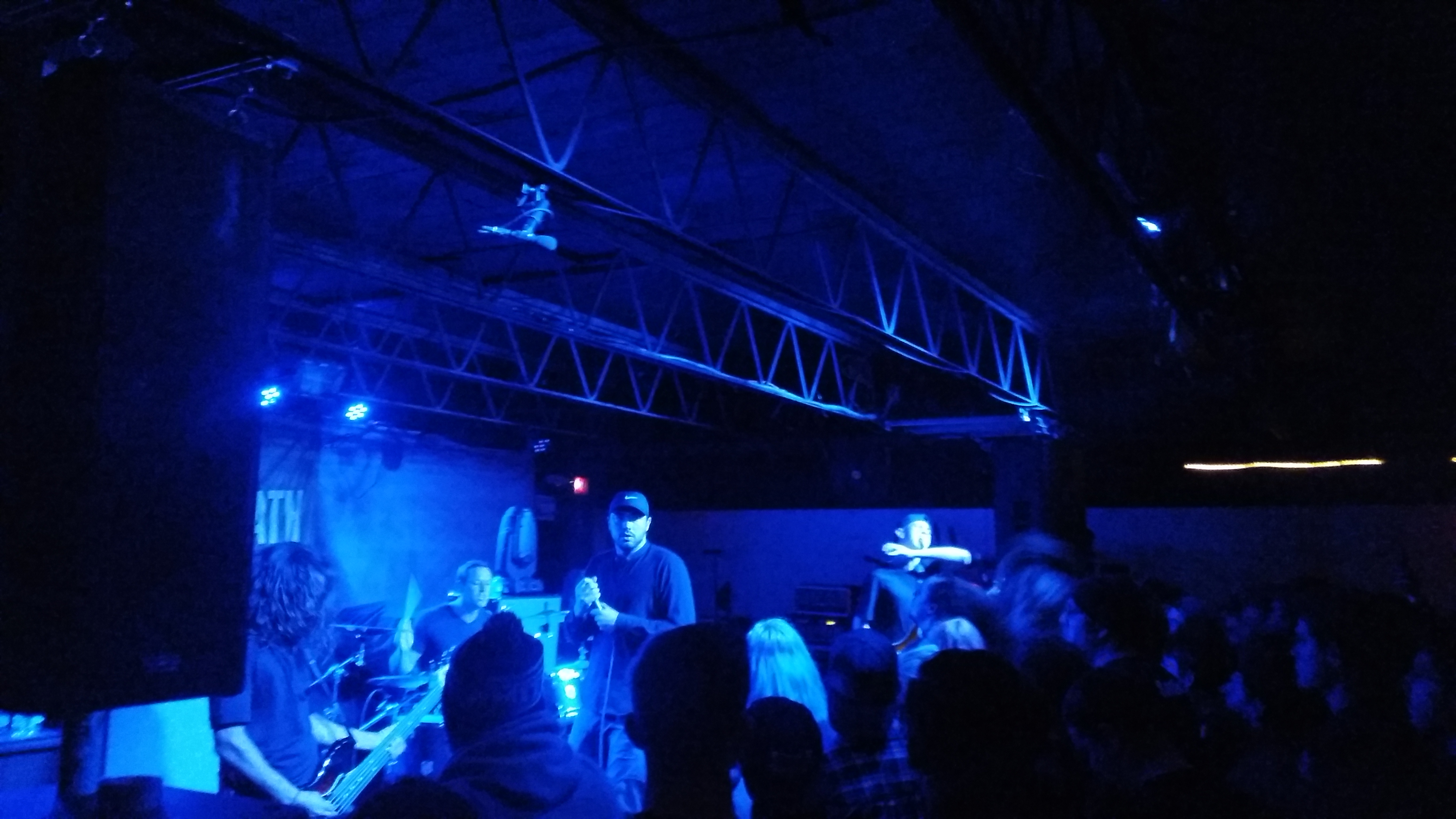
- Make Them Suffer performing in 2017

Background information
- Origin: Perth, Australia
- Genres: Metalcore; symphonic death metal; deathcore; blackened death metal (early)
- Years active: 2008–present
- Labels: SharpTone; Greyscale; Rise; Roadrunner
- Members: Sean Harmanis; Nick McLernon; Jaya Jeffery; Jordan Mather; Alex Reade
- Past members: Richard West; Heather Menaglio; Cody Brooks; Craig Buckingham; Lachlan Monty; Chris Arias-Real; Louisa Burton; Tim Madden; Booka Nile
- Website: mtsband.com

Make Them Suffer is an Australian metalcore band from Perth, formed in 2008. They are currently signed to SharpTone Records. Their debut studio album, Neverbloom, peaked at No. 56 on the ARIA Album charts in June 2012, and showcased the band's earlier mix of metalcore, blackened death metal, and symphonic metal. Its follow-up Old Souls debuted at No. 30 upon release in May 2015 and displayed the band beginning to transition from death/black metal to a more progressive metalcore sound. After the band signed with Rise Records, the label released an expanded version of Old Souls in August 2016, containing their EP Lord of Woe (originally self-released in 2010) and a new track, "Ether". Despite the name, the band is not named after the Cannibal Corpse song of the same name.

== History ==
They self-released their debut EP, Lord of Woe, on 27 September 2010. In February 2012, the group signed with Roadrunner Records and on 25 May that year released their debut studio album Neverbloom.

They released a single entitled "Let Me In" on 12 May 2014. On 29 May 2015, Make Them Suffer released their second studio album entitled Old Souls. The band signed to Rise Records internationally in January 2016. On 14 June 2016, they released a new track titled "Ether". On 19 August 2016, the band released a deluxe edition for Old Souls, which also included "Ether", and their Lord of Woe EP remastered.

On 7 June 2017, the band released the single "Fireworks" and announced their third studio album, Worlds Apart, to be released on 28 July. On 9 June, it was announced that Chris Arias-Real, Lachlan Monty, and Louisa Burton were no longer in the band. Jaya Jeffery was announced as the new bassist and Booka Nile was announced as the new keyboardist. The band completed a headlining world tour in 2017 in support of the Worlds Apart album through Canada, USA, Europe, UK and Australia with supporting acts Wage War, Enterprise Earth, Novelists, Spite, and Alpha Wolf.

On 24 July 2018, a new single "27" was released. In September 2018, the band toured America with After the Burial and the Acacia Strain. In December 2018, a North American tour with Kingdom of Giants, Chelsea Grin, and Born of Osiris was announced to take place in 2019. On 7 June 2019, the band released a new single "Hollowed Heart".

On 19 June 2020, the band released their fourth studio album How to Survive a Funeral, with the physical edition being released on 10 July 2020. The album had been originally slated to be released on 24 July 2020. In 2021, keyboardist and clean vocalist Booka Nile took time away from the band during COVID-19 pandemic to appear on the eighth season of Married at First Sight. On 25 June 2021, the band released a new single "Contraband", featuring Courtney LaPlante of Spiritbox.

On 24 February 2022, the band announced via their Twitter that Booka Nile was no longer a member of the band. On 13 October, the band announced Alex Reade from Drown This City as their new keyboardist, and they have released their first song with Reade, "Doomswitch". On 8 March 2023, in celebration of its 10th anniversary, the band released a remastered version of their debut album Neverbloom, and announced an Australian anniversary tour with Fit for an Autopsy and Ocean Sleeper which would take place in May and June.

On 11 May 2023, Make Them Suffer announced that they had signed with SharpTone Records, aligning with Greyscale Records, and they released a new single "Ghost of Me" along with a corresponding music video. On 9 April 2024, the band unveiled another single "Epitaph" and an accompanying music video. On 8 August 2024, another single was released called "Oscillator" and a self-titled album was announced soon after and includes their previously released singles from "Doomswitch" onwards. On 11 October 2024, the band released yet another new single "Mana God", along with an accompanying music video. Their fifth studio album, Make Them Suffer, was released on 8 November 2024.

On 23 February 2026, the band was announced as part of the lineup for the Louder Than Life music festival in Louisville, scheduled to take place in September.

On 13 July 2026, the band announced via their social media pages that recording for their upcoming sixth album had been completed. On 11 November 2026, the band released a new single "Black Sheep", along with a corresponding music video.

== Musical style ==
Make Them Suffer's musical style has been described as metalcore, progressive metalcore, symphonic death metal, and deathcore. Their earlier musical style has been described as blackened death metal.

== Band members ==
Current

- Sean Harmanis – unclean vocals (2008–present); clean vocals (2015–present)
- Nick McLernon – lead guitar, backing vocals (2011–present); rhythm guitar (2016–present)
- Jaya Jeffery – bass (2017–present; touring member 2016)
- Jordan Mather – drums (2018–present; touring member 2017)
- Alex Reade – keyboards, keytar, piano, clean & unclean vocals (2022–present)

Former

- Richard West – rhythm guitar (2008–2009)
- Heather Menaglio – keyboards, piano (2008–2011)
- Cody Brooks – rhythm guitar, backing vocals (2009–2011)
- Craig Buckingham – rhythm guitar (2011–2013)
- Lachlan Monty – rhythm guitar (2013–2016)
- Chris Arias-Real – bass (2008–2017)
- Louisa Burton – keyboards, piano, clean vocals (2011–2017)
- Tim Madden – drums (2008–2018)
- Booka Nile – keyboards, piano, clean vocals (2017–2022)

Timeline

== Discography ==
=== Studio albums ===
List of studio albums, with release date and label details shown
Title	Album details	Peak chart positions
Title	Album details	AUS
Neverbloom	Released: 25 May 2012; Label: Roadrunner (RR7640-2); Format: CD, digital download	56
Old Souls	Released: 28 May 2015; Label: Roadrunner (541966108-2); Format: CD, digital download	30
Worlds Apart	Released: 28 July 2017; Label: Rise (Rise 385-2); Format: CD, digital download, LP	29
How to Survive a Funeral	Released: 19 June 2020; Label: Rise (Rise 463-1); Format: CD, digital download, LP, streaming	17
Make Them Suffer	Released: 8 November 2024; Label: SharpTone; Format: CD, digital download, LP, streaming	38

=== Extended plays ===
List of EPs released, with release date and label details shown
Title	Details
Demo	Released: 31 January 2009; Label: Self-released; Format: CD
Lord of Woe	Released: 27 September 2010; Label: Self-released; Format: CD

=== Singles ===
List of singles, with year released
Title	Year	Album
"Weeping Wastelands"	2010	Lord of Woe
"Neverbloom"	2012	Neverbloom
"Widower"	2012	Neverbloom
"Elegies"	2013	Neverbloom
"Let Me In"	2014	Old Souls
"Requiem"	2015	Old Souls
"Blood Moon"	2015	Old Souls
"Threads"	2015	Old Souls
"Ether"	2016	Old Souls and Lord of Woe
"Fireworks"	2017	Worlds Apart
"Uncharted"	2017	Worlds Apart
"Vortex (Interdimensional Spiral Hindering Inexplicable Euphoria)"	2017	Worlds Apart
"Save Yourself"	2017	Worlds Apart
"27"	2018	Non-album single
"Hollowed Heart"	2019	Non-album single
"Erase Me"	2020	How to Survive a Funeral
"Drown with Me"	2020	How to Survive a Funeral
"Soul Decay"	2020	How to Survive a Funeral
"Contraband" (featuring Courtney LaPlante of Spiritbox)	2021	Non-album single
"Doomswitch"	2022	Make Them Suffer
"Ghost of Me"	2023	Make Them Suffer
"Epitaph"	2024	Make Them Suffer
"Oscillator"	2024	Make Them Suffer
"Mana God"	2024	Make Them Suffer
"Small Town Syndrome"	2024	Make Them Suffer
"Black Sheep"	2026	TBA

==== As featured artist ====
List of singles, with year released
Title	Year	Album
"SOS" (PhaseOne featuring Make Them Suffer)	2025	TERRANOVA
"Our Remedy" (Caskets featuring Make Them Suffer)	2025	The Only Heaven You'll Know
"Cerebral Malfunction" August Burns Red featuring Make Them Suffer	2026	Season of Surrender
"Torn wide open" (Boundaries and Make Them Suffer)	2026	Yearning: The Unbeautiful After
"Dead Silent" (We Came As Romans featuring Make Them Suffer)	2026	All Is Beautiful... Because We're Doomed: Circularity

== Awards and nominations ==
=== AIR Awards ===
The Australian Independent Record Awards (known colloquially as the AIR Awards) is an annual awards night to recognise, promote and celebrate the success of Australia's Independent Music sector.

Year	Nominee / work	Award	Result	Ref.
2021	How to Survive a Funeral	Best Independent Heavy Album or EP	Nominated	

=== APRA Music Awards ===
The APRA Music Awards were established by Australasian Performing Right Association (APRA) in 1982 to honour the achievements of songwriters and music composers, and to recognise their song writing skills, sales and airplay performance, by its members annually.

Year	Nominee / work	Award	Result	Ref.
2025	"Epitaph"	Most Performed Hard Rock / Heavy Metal Work	Won	
2026	"Tether"	Most Performed Hard Rock / Heavy Metal Work	Nominated	
