= Armamentarium (album) =

Studio album by Neaera
- Released: August 24, 2007
- Recorded: June 2007
- Studio: Hansen Studios
- Genre: Melodic death metal, metalcore
- Length: 52:57
- Label: Metal Blade
- Producer: Jacob Hansen, Alexander Dietz, Neaera

Neaera chronology
Let the Tempest Come (2006)	Armamentarium (2007)	Omnicide – Creation Unleashed (2009)

Professional ratings
Review scores
Source	Rating
About.com	3/5 stars
Allmusic	3.5/5 stars

Armamentarium is the third studio album by German melodic death metal band Neaera. It was released on 24 August 2007 through Metal Blade Records.

== Packaging ==
The first edition of this album contains a bonus DVD (61 minutes long) of Neaera playing live in their hometown of Münster.

== Track listing ==
All lyrics are written by Neaera; all music is composed by Neaera.

No.	Title	Length
1.	"Spearheading the Spawn"	5:45
2.	"Tools of Greed"	3:51
3.	"Armamentarium"	4:45
4.	"Synergy"	4:53
5.	"Harbinger"	4:56
6.	"In Loss"	3:32
7.	"The Orphaning"	3:51
8.	"The Escape from Escapism"	4:08
9.	"Mutiny of Untamed Minds"	4:31
10.	"The Need for Pain"	5:29
11.	"Liberation"	7:13
Total length:		52:57

US bonus track
No.	Title	Length
12.	"The Cleansing Void"	4:09
Total length:		57:06

Bonus DVD
No.	Title	Length
1.	"Mechanisms of Standstill"
2.	"Paradigm Lost"
3.	"The World Devourers"
4.	"Let the Tempest Come"
5.	"I Love the World"
6.	"Armamentarium"
7.	"Walls Instead of Bridges"
8.	"...to Oblivion" (contains "From Grief...")
9.	"Broken Spine"
10.	"Scars to Grey"
11.	"Where Submission Reigns"

== Credits ==
Writing, performance and production credits are adapted from the album liner notes.

=== Personnel ===
Neaera

- Benjamin Hilleke – vocals
- Stefan Keller – guitar
- Tobias Buck – guitar
- Benjamin Donath – bass
- Sebastian Heldt – drums

Additional musicians

- Marcus Bischoff (Heaven Shall Burn) – vocals on "Liberation"

Production

- Neaera – production
- Jacob Hansen – production, recording, mixing, mastering
- Alexander Dietz (Heaven Shall Burn) – vocals recording
- Ralf Müller – vocals recording

Artwork and design

- theterje.net – artwork

=== Studios ===
- Hansen Studios – recording, mixing, mastering
- Rape of Harmonies Studios – vocals recording

== Chart performance ==
Chart (2007)	Peak position
German Albums (Offizielle Top 100)	65
