= Neaera (band) =

German heavy metal band

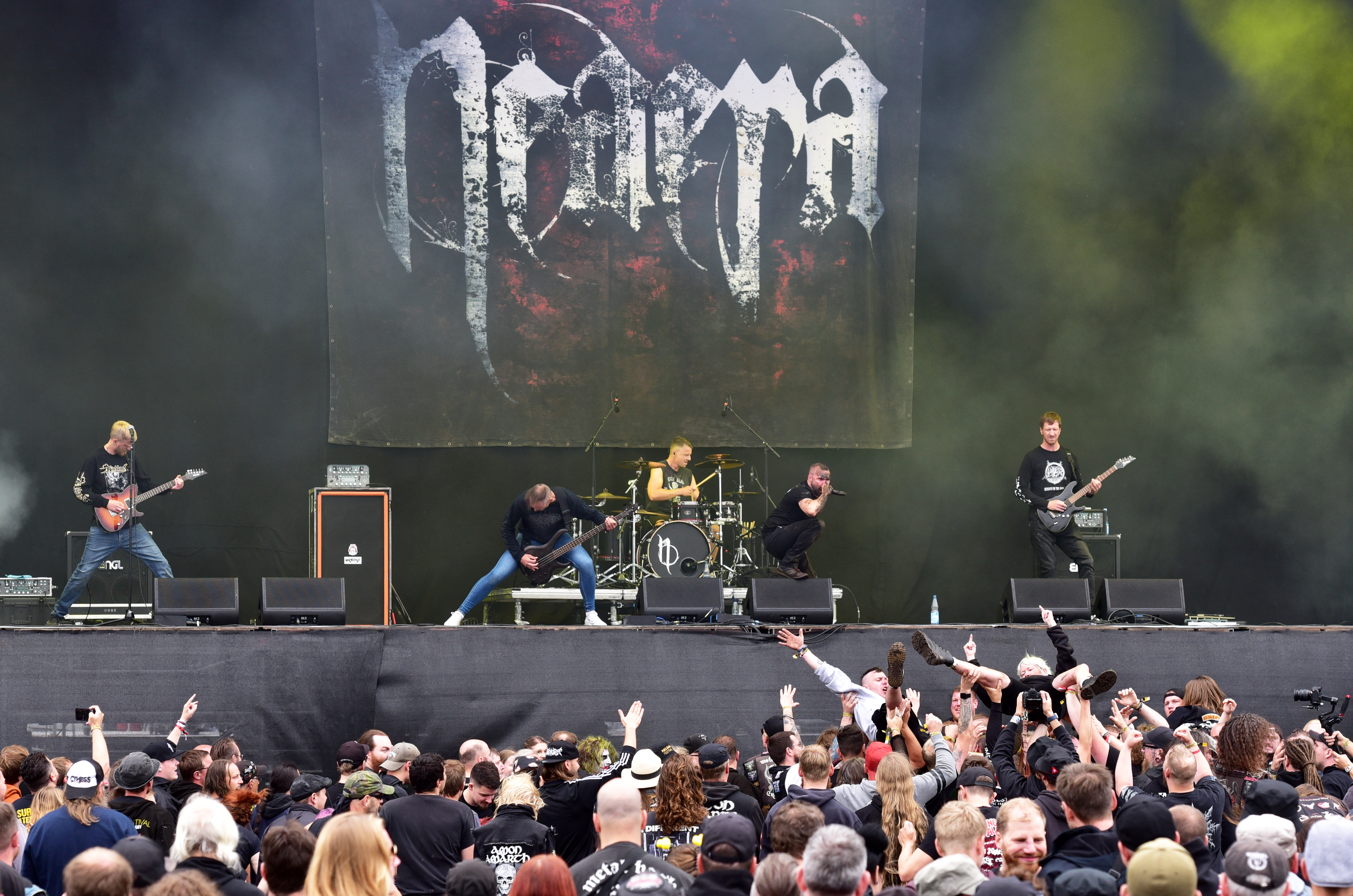
- Neaera in 2024

Background information
- Origin: Münster, North Rhine-Westphalia, Germany
- Genres: Melodic death metal, metalcore
- Years active: 2003–2015, 2018–present
- Label: Metal Blade
- Members: Benjamin Hilleke; Stefan Keller; Tobias Buck; Benjamin Donath; Sebastian Heldt
- Website: www.neaera.com

Neaera is a German heavy metal band from Münster, formed in 2003 and disbanded in 2015. The band have released eight studio albums.

== Musical style ==
Tobias Buck started Neaera to change the style he had played before with death metal band Malzan. The band was interested in the Swedish death metal genre, and created their own sound based on similar styles. The band's style is noted for "moving beyond the bounds of normal melodic death metal and metalcore to include elements that most bands in the German scene have eschewed."

== Band members ==
- Benjamin Hilleke – lead vocals
- Stefan Keller – guitar
- Tobias Buck – guitar
- Benjamin Donath – bass
- Sebastian Heldt – drums

== Discography ==
Neaera discography
- Studio albums: 8
- Music videos: 6

=== Studio albums ===
List of studio albums, with chart positions
Year	Album details	Peak chart positions
Year	Album details	GER
2005	The Rising Tide of Oblivion: Released: March 21, 2005; Label: Metal Blade; Format: CD, digital download	—
2006	Let the Tempest Come: Released: April 7, 2006; Label: Metal Blade; Format: CD, digital download	—
2007	Armamentarium: Released: August 24, 2007; Label: Metal Blade; Format: CD, digital download	65
2009	Omnicide – Creation Unleashed: Released: May 26, 2009; Label: Metal Blade; Format: CD, digital download	51
2010	Forging the Eclipse: Released: October 26, 2010; Label: Metal Blade; Format: CD, digital download	—
2013	Ours Is the Storm: Released: March 1, 2013; Label: Metal Blade; Format: CD, digital download	48
2020	Neaera: Released: February 28, 2020; Label: Metal Blade; Format: CD, digital download, vinyl	8
2024	All Is Dust: Released: June 28, 2024; Label: Metal Blade; Format: CD, digital download, vinyl	18
"—" denotes a recording that did not chart.

=== Music videos ===
Title	Album
"Paradigm Lost"	Let the Tempest Come
"Let the Tempest Come"	Let the Tempest Come
"Prey to Anguish"	Omnicide – Creation Unleashed
"Heaven´s Descent"	Forging the Eclipse
"Torchbearer"	Neaera
