= List of Malevolent Creation members =

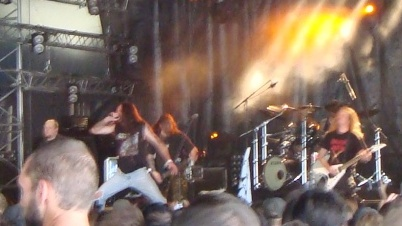
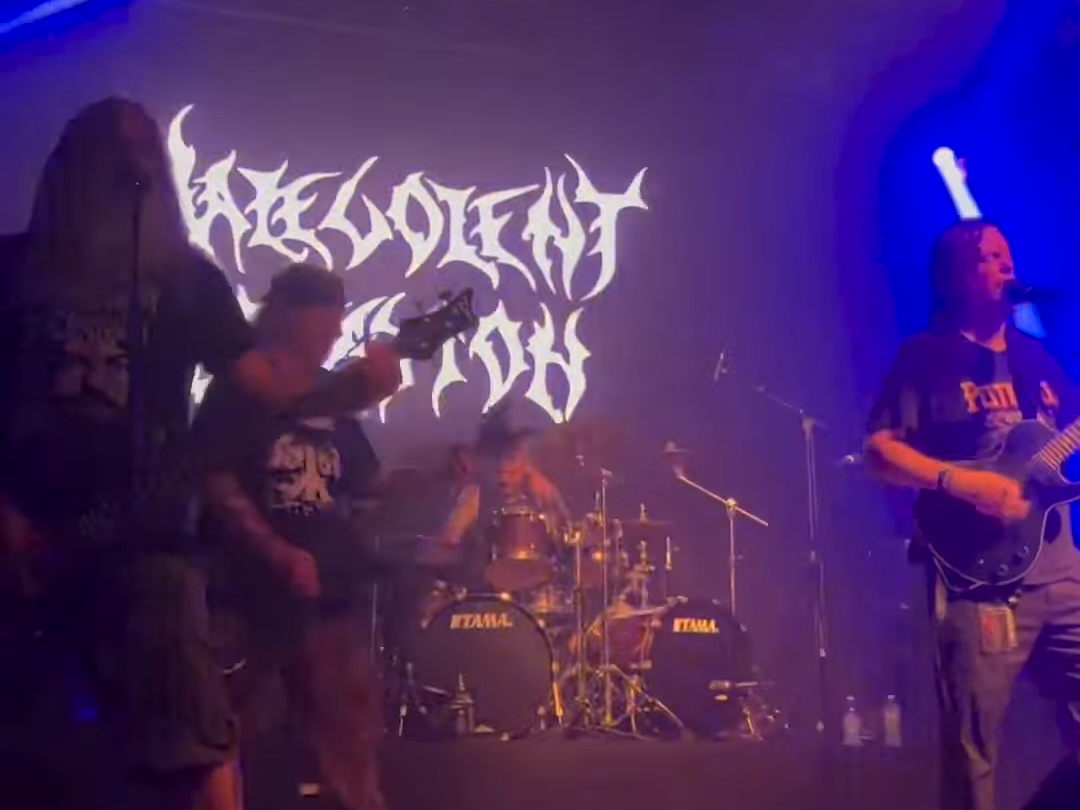
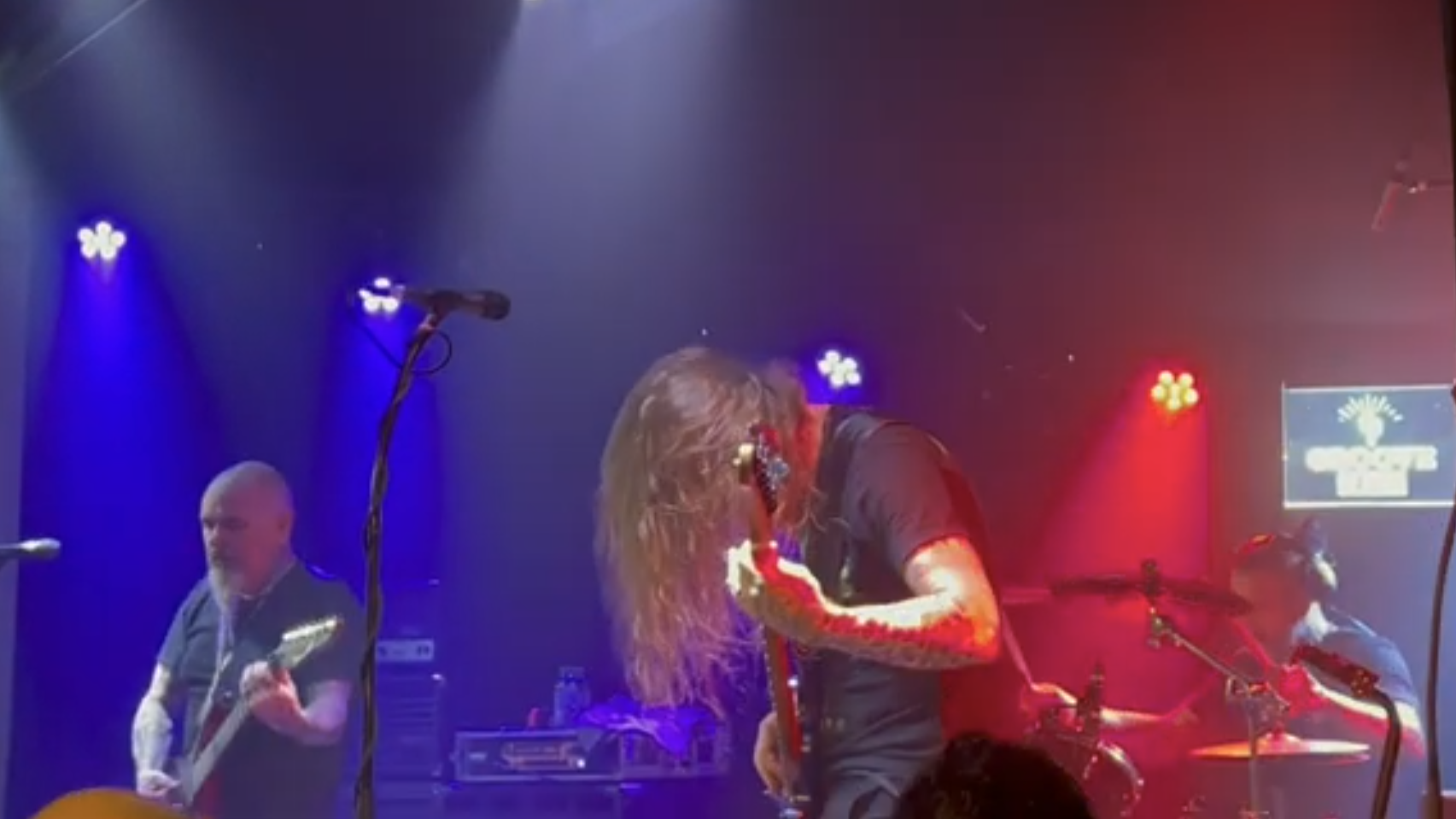
Three line-ups of Malevolent Creation performing in 2011, 2023 and 2025

Malevolent Creation is an American death metal band from Buffalo, New York. Formed in late 1986, the group originally consisted of vocalist Brett Hoffman, guitarists Phil Fasciana and Jim Nickles, bassist Jason Blachowicz and drummer Dennis Kubas. The band's current lineup features Fasciana, drummer Ronnie Parmer (since 2020), vocalist/guitarist Deron Miller (from 2022 to 2024 and since 2025), bassist/vocalist Jesse Jolly (since 2024), and guitarist Chris Cannella (since 2025)

== History ==
=== 1986–1997 ===
Phil Fasciana, Brett Hoffman and Jim Nickles formed Malevolent Creation in late 1986, writing songs as a trio for "10 months or so", before adding Jason Blachowicz and Dennis Kubas to record the band's first demo in September 1987. Shortly after its release, the group relocated to Florida and replaced Nickles, Blachowicz and Kubas with Jon Rubin, Scott O'Dell and Lee Harrison, respectively, who recorded a live demo in early 1989. Blachowicz returned for a studio demo later in the year, before Mark van Erp and drummer Mark Simpson joined for the band's fourth demo in 1990. When the band recorded its debut studio album The Ten Commandments in early 1991, van Erp had been replaced by the returning Blachowicz; Rubin left during the sessions, with his replacement Jeff Juszkiewicz overdubbing some lead guitar parts.

For 1992's Retribution, Juszkiewicz and Simpson were replaced by Rob Barrett and Alex Marquez of Solstice. In early 1993, Barrett left Malevolent Creation to join Cannibal Corpse. He was replaced by a returning Jon Rubin. Marquez also briefly left around the same time, replaced by Larry Hawke, but returned in time to perform on the recording of Stillborn later in the summer. After a European tour at the beginning of 1994, founding vocalist Hoffmann left Malevolent Creation. Blachowicz subsequently took over on vocals, and later in the year the band recorded Eternal with new drummer Dave Culross. By the end of 1995, Culross had been replaced by Derek Roddy, who Fasciana claimed was "way sicker" than his predecessor. Rubin also left shortly thereafter, replaced briefly by Jason Hagen during writing for In Cold Blood.

Before recording for In Cold Blood began, Hagen was fired after falling out with Roddy. His place was taken by John Paul Soars, who performed on the album. Shortly after In Cold Blood was completed and released, Roddy was also fired after falling out with Blachowicz, with Tony Laureano taking over on drums for the album's promotional tour. Just before a European tour starting in August 1997, Soars left the band to focus on his regular job. He was replaced by the returning Rob Barrett, who had just left Cannibal Corpse; after the tour ended in October, Blachowicz left following a fight with Fasciana.

=== 1998–2009 ===
After a brief hiatus, during which time Phil Fasciana considered disbanding the group, Malevolent Creation returned with former members Bret Hoffmann and Dave Culross back in the lineup, joined by new bassist Gordon Simms. With their original vocalist, the band released The Fine Art of Murder in 1998 and Envenomed in 2000, before parting ways with Hoffmann again in January 2002 due to his ongoing problems with drug and alcohol abuse. He was replaced with Kyle Symons, frontman of Fasciana and Barrett's side project Hateplow. For a European tour starting in March, Culross was replaced by Gus Rios. In June, the group announced that it would be recording its next album The Will to Kill with Justin DiPinto on drums. By the end of the year, DiPinto himself had been replaced by Ariel Alvarado as touring drummer.

Starting in March 2003, Tony Laureano returned to Malevolent Creation on a temporary touring basis. He was briefly replaced by Rios in the summer for a planned tour of Brazil, but returned for the shows when they were postponed until September. In November, the group announced the return of Dave Culross for a third tenure. In July 2004 the band released Warkult, before Barrett and Simms were replaced in October 2005 by returning members Jon Rubin and Jason Blachowicz, respectively. By December, the group had announced a reunion with Bret Hoffmann for a European tour at the beginning of 2006, for which they would also be joined by bassist Marco Martell and drummer David Kinkade – bandmates of Blachowicz in Divine Empire. After the tour's conclusion, Symons did not return and Hoffmann remained.

The band announced that it would be recording a new album during 2006 with drummer Tony Laureano, however he later stated that he was unable to take part due to "various scheduling conflicts". In his place, Dave Culross returned for a fourth spell. After recording and touring in promotion of Doomsday X, Culross left again in September 2007 for undisclosed reasons. The band also revealed that Blachowicz had left, claiming that both departing members "have prior job obligations and could not try to work things out". The following month, Marco Martell and Fabian Aguirre were unveiled as the replacements on bass and drums, respectively. By September 2008, Blachowicz had returned. At the same time, Martell took over from Rubin on guitar and Gus Rios replaced Aguirre on drums, and they returned to touring.

=== Since 2009 ===
In July 2009, Gio Geraca took over as Malevolent Creation's touring bassist. He became a permanent band member later in the year. When guitarist Martell left at the beginning of 2010, Geraca took over his role for the recording of the group's next album Invidious Dominion. By June, Blachowicz had returned yet again to take over on bass. This lineup of Hoffmann, Geraca, Fasciana, Blachowicz and Rios remained stable for almost four years, before Rios left in February 2014 due to "personal differences". He was replaced in July by another returning member, Justin DiPinto. The new lineup recorded the band's next album Dead Man's Path, which was released in September 2015. After cancelling a US tour in promotion of the album, the band went on an unofficial hiatus in starting October 2016.

After just over a year away, Malevolent Creation resurfaced in November 2017, with constant member Phil Fasciana joined in the new lineup by vocalist and guitarist Lee Wollenschlaeger, bassist Josh Gibbs, and drummer Phil Cancilla. On July 7, 2018, founding vocalist Bret Hoffmann died of colorectal cancer. The new lineup of the band recorded The 13th Beast, which was released in January 2019. Just over a year later in February 2020, after the '13th Beast over Latin America' tour, Cancilla was replaced by Ronnie Parmer. Cancilla's last show with the band was Feb 9th, 2020 in Miami. This was the only US show that the 13th Beast lineup had played and was also the band's only US show since 2016. In April 2020 after the European Tour, Wollenschlaeger was replaced by Ryan Taylor. Taylor was replaced by former CKY frontman Deron Miller in October 2022. In March 2024, bassist Josh Gibbs was replaced by Jesse Jolly. Miller stopped performing with the band in November, with Jolly handling lead vocals for following live dates while the band decided whether to replace Miller. In March 2025, Chris Cannella (ex-Deicide) joined on second guitar.

In November 2025 Miller returned to the band, bringing the line-up to three guitarists.

== Members ==
=== Current ===
Image	Name	Years active	Instruments	Release contributions
	Phil Fasciana	1986–present	guitars; occasional keyboards	all Malevolent Creation (MC) releases
	Ronnie Parmer	2020–present	drums	none to date
	Deron Miller	2022–2024; 2025–present	vocals; guitars	none to date

=== Former ===
Image	Name	Years active	Instruments	Release contributions
	Bret Hoffmann	1986–1994; 1997–2002; 2005–2016 (died 2018)	vocals	all MC releases from the untitled 1987 demo to Live Death (1994), and from Doomsday X (2007) to Dead Man's Path (2015); Joe Black (1996); The Fine Art of Murder (1998); Envenomed (2000)
	Jim Nickles	1986–1987	guitars	untitled 1987 demo
	Jason Blachowicz	1987; 1989–1990; 1991–1997; 2005–2007; 2008–2009; 2010–2016	bass; vocals (1994–1997)	untitled 1987 demo; untitled 1989 studio demo; all MC releases from The Ten Commandments (1991) to In Cold Blood (1997); Doomsday X (2007); Lost Commandments (2008); Death from Down Under (2010); Invidious Dominion (2010); Dead Man's Path (2015)
	Dennis Kubas	1987	drums	untitled 1987 demo
	Jon Rubin	1987–1991; 1993–1996; 2005–2008	guitars	untitled 1989 live and studio demos; untitled 1990 demo; The Ten Commandments (1991); Stillborn (1993); Eternal (1995); Joe Black (1996); Doomsday X (2007); Lost Commandments (2008)
	Lee Harrison	1987–1990	drums	untitled 1989 live and studio demos
	Scott O'Dell	1987–1989	bass	untitled 1989 live demo
	Mark Simpson	1990–1992	drums	untitled 1990 demo; The Ten Commandments (1991)
	Mark van Erp	1990–1991	bass	untitled 1990 demo
	Jeff Juszkiewicz	1991–1992	guitars	The Ten Commandments (1991)
	Alex Marquez	1992–1993; 1993–1994	drums	Retribution (1992); Live EP (1993); Stillborn (1993); Live Death (1994); Joe Black (1996)
	Rob Barrett	1992–1993; 1997–2005	guitars	Retribution (1992); Live EP (1993); Live Death (1994); all MC releases from The Fine Art of Murder (1998) to Conquering South America (2004); Live at the Whisky a Go Go (2008); Lost Commandments (2008)
	"Crazy" Larry Hawke	1993 (died 1997)	drums	Joe Black (1996) – one track only
	Dave Culross	1994–1995; 1997–2001; 2003–2005; 2006–2007	drums	Eternal (1995); Joe Black (1996); The Fine Art of Murder (1998); Envenomed (2000); Warkult (2004); Doomsday X (2007); Live at the Whisky a Go Go (2008); Lost Commandments (2008)
	Derek Roddy	1995–1997	drums	In Cold Blood (1997)
	Jason Hagen	1996–1997	guitars	none
	John Paul Soars	1997	guitars	In Cold Blood (1997)
	Gordon Simms	1997–2005	bass	all MC releases from The Fine Art of Murder (1998) to Lost Commandments (2008) (except Doomsday X)
	Kyle Symons	2002–2005	vocals	The Will to Kill (2002); Warkult (2004); Conquering South America (2004); Lost Commandments (2008)
	Gus Rios	2002; 2003 (both touring); 2008–2014	drums	Death from Down Under (2010); Invidious Dominion (2010)
	Justin DiPinto	2002 (session); 2014–2016	drums	The Will to Kill (2002); Dead Man's Path (2015)
	Marco Martell	2006 (touring); 2007–2010	guitars; bass	Death from Down Under (2010)
	Gio Geraca	2009–2016	guitars; bass	Invidious Dominion (2010); Dead Man's Path (2015)
	Josh Gibbs	2017–2024	bass; backing vocals; lead guitar (studio)	The 13th Beast (2019)
	Phil Cancilla	2017–2020	drums	The 13th Beast (2019)
	Lee Wollenschlaeger	2017–2020	guitars; vocals	The 13th Beast (2019)
	Ryan Taylor	2020–2022	guitars; vocals	The 13th Beast (2019) – guest appearance on two tracks
	Jesse Jolly	2024–2026	bass; vocals	none
	Chris Cannella	2025–2026	guitars; backing vocals	none

=== Touring ===
Image	Name	Years active	Instruments	Notes
	Tony Laureano	1997; 2003; 2006	drums	Laureano played with the band on three stints, and appeared on Conquering South America (2004)
	Ariel Alvarado	2002–2003	drums	Alvarado joined for the supporting tour of The Will to Kill (2002), although he was replaced by Laureano.
	David Kinkade	2006	drums	Kinkade joined for a tour in 2006, although Laureano later returned in his place.
	Fabian Aguirre	2007–2008	drums	Aguirre replaced Culross in October 2007, although he was replaced by Gus Rios.
	James Walford	2011	guitars	
	Sean Martinez	2011	bass	Martinez played with the band around 2011.
	John Cooke	2012	bass	Cooke played with the band on a 2012 European tour.
	Kevin Peace	2013	bass	

== Lineups ==
Period	Members	Releases
Late 1986 – summer 1987	Phil Fasciana – guitars; Bret Hoffmann – vocals; Jim Nickles – guitars	none
Summer – fall 1987	Phil Fasciana – guitars; Bret Hoffmann – vocals; Jim Nickles – guitars; Jason Blachowicz – bass; Dennis Kubas – drums	untitled 1987 studio demo
Late 1987 – early 1989	Phil Fasciana – guitars; Bret Hoffmann – vocals; Jon Rubin – guitars; Lee Harrison – drums; Scott O'Dell – bass	untitled 1989 live demo
Spring 1989 – early 1990	Phil Fasciana – guitars; Bret Hoffmann – vocals; Jon Rubin – guitars; Lee Harrison – drums; Jason Blachowicz – bass	untitled 1989 studio demo
Early 1990 – early 1991	Phil Fasciana – guitars; Bret Hoffmann – vocals; Jon Rubin – guitars; Mark van Erp – bass; Mark Simpson – drums	untitled 1990 demo
Early – spring 1991	Phil Fasciana – guitars; Bret Hoffmann – vocals; Jon Rubin – guitars; Mark Simpson – drums; Jason Blachowicz – bass	The Ten Commandments (1991) – basic master recordings
Spring 1991 – spring 1992	Phil Fasciana – guitars; Bret Hoffmann – vocals; Mark Simpson – drums; Jason Blachowicz – bass; Jeff Juszkiewicz – guitars	The Ten Commandments (1991) – lead guitar overdubbing
Spring 1992 – spring 1993	Phil Fasciana – guitars; Bret Hoffmann – vocals; Jason Blachowicz – bass; Rob Barrett – guitars; Alex Marquez – drums	Retribution (1992); Live EP (1993); Live Death (1994)
Spring – summer 1993	Phil Fasciana – guitars; Bret Hoffmann – vocals; Jason Blachowicz – bass; Jon Rubin – guitars; Larry Hawke – drums	Joe Black (1996) – one track
Summer 1993 – March 1994	Phil Fasciana – guitars; Bret Hoffmann – vocals; Jason Blachowicz – bass; Jon Rubin – guitars; Alex Marquez – drums	Stillborn (1993); Joe Black (1996) – one track
Spring 1994 – late 1995	Phil Fasciana – guitars; Jason Blachowicz – bass, vocals; Jon Rubin – guitars; Dave Culross – drums	Eternal (1995); Joe Black (1996) – three tracks
Late 1995 – late 1996	Phil Fasciana – guitars; Jason Blachowicz – bass, vocals; Jon Rubin – guitars; Derek Roddy – drums	none
Late 1996 – early 1997	Phil Fasciana – guitars; Jason Blachowicz – bass, vocals; Derek Roddy – drums; Jason Hagen – guitars	none
Early – June 1997	Phil Fasciana – guitars; Jason Blachowicz – bass, vocals; Derek Roddy – drums; John Paul Soars – guitars	In Cold Blood (1997)
June – August 1997	Phil Fasciana – guitars; Jason Blachowicz – bass, vocals; John Paul Soars – guitars; Tony Laureano – drums (touring)	none
August – October 1997	Phil Fasciana – guitars; Jason Blachowicz – bass, vocals; Tony Laureano – drums; Rob Barrett – guitars	none
Late 1997 – January 2002	Phil Fasciana – guitars; Rob Barrett – guitars; Bret Hoffmann – vocals; Dave Culross – drums; Gordon Simms – bass	The Fine Art of Murder (1998); Envenomed (2000); Live at the Whisky a Go Go (2008)
January – March 2002	Phil Fasciana – guitars; Rob Barrett – guitars; Dave Culross – drums; Gordon Simms – bass; Kyle Symons – vocals	none
March – April 2002	Phil Fasciana – guitars; Rob Barrett – guitars; Gordon Simms – bass; Kyle Symons – vocals; Gus Rios – drums (touring)	none
June – late 2002	Phil Fasciana – guitars; Rob Barrett – guitars; Gordon Simms – bass; Kyle Symons – vocals; Justin DiPinto – drums (session)	The Will to Kill (2002)
Late 2002 – March 2003	Phil Fasciana – guitars; Rob Barrett – guitars; Gordon Simms – bass; Kyle Symons – vocals; Ariel Alvarado – drums (touring)	none
March – May 2003	Phil Fasciana – guitars; Rob Barrett – guitars; Gordon Simms – bass; Kyle Symons – vocals; Tony Laureano – drums (touring)	none
June – July 2003	Phil Fasciana – guitars; Rob Barrett – guitars; Gordon Simms – bass; Kyle Symons – vocals; Gus Rios – drums (touring)	none
August – September 2003	Phil Fasciana – guitars; Rob Barrett – guitars; Gordon Simms – bass; Kyle Symons – vocals; Tony Laureano – drums (touring)	Conquering South America (2004)
November 2003 – October 2005	Phil Fasciana – guitars; Rob Barrett – guitars; Gordon Simms – bass; Kyle Symons – vocals; Dave Culross – drums	Warkult (2004); Lost Commandments (2008)
October – December 2005	Phil Fasciana – guitars; Kyle Symons – vocals; Dave Culross – drums; Jason Blachowicz – bass; Jon Rubin – guitars	none
December 2005 – March 2006	Phil Fasciana – guitars; Jon Rubin – guitars; Bret Hoffmann – vocals; Marco Martell – bass (touring); David Kinkade – drums (touring)	none
March – July 2006	Phil Fasciana – guitars; Jon Rubin – guitars; Bret Hoffmann – vocals; Jason Blachowicz – bass; Tony Laureano – drums	none
Fall 2006 – September 2007	Phil Fasciana – guitars; Jon Rubin – guitars; Bret Hoffmann – vocals; Jason Blachowicz – bass; Dave Culross – drums	Doomsday X (2007); Lost Commandments (2008)
October 2007 – September 2008	Phil Fasciana – guitars; Jon Rubin – guitars; Bret Hoffmann – vocals; Marco Martell – bass; Fabian Aguirre – drums (touring)	none
September 2008 – July 2009	Phil Fasciana – guitars; Bret Hoffmann – vocals; Marco Martell – guitars; Jason Blachowicz – bass; Gus Rios – drums	Australian Onslaught (2010)
July 2009 – February 2010	Phil Fasciana – guitars; Bret Hoffmann – vocals; Marco Martell – guitars, bass; Gus Rios – drums; Gio Geraca – bass, guitars	none
February – June 2010	Phil Fasciana – guitars; Bret Hoffmann – vocals; Gus Rios – drums; Gio Geraca – bass, guitars	none
June 2010 – February 2014	Phil Fasciana – guitars; Bret Hoffmann – vocals; Gus Rios – drums; Gio Geraca – guitars; Jason Blachowicz – bass	Invidious Dominion (2010)
January – March 2012	Phil Fasciana – guitars; Bret Hoffmann – vocals; Gus Rios – drums; Gio Geraca – guitars; John Cooke – bass (touring)	
March 2012 – February 2014	Phil Fasciana – guitars; Bret Hoffmann – vocals; Gus Rios – drums; Gio Geraca – guitars; Jason Blachowicz – bass	
July 2014 – September 2016	Phil Fasciana – guitars; Bret Hoffmann – vocals; Gio Geraca – guitars; Jason Blachowicz – bass; Justin DiPinto – drums	Dead Man's Path (2015)
Band on hiatus September 2016 – November 2017
November 2017 – April 2020	Phil Fasciana – guitars; Josh Gibbs – bass, backing vocals; Lee Wollenschlaeger – guitars, lead vocals; Phil Cancilla – drums	The 13th Beast (2019)
April 2020 – October 2022	Phil Fasciana – guitars; Josh Gibbs – bass, backing vocals; Ryan Taylor – guitars, lead vocals; Ronnie Parmer – drums	none
October 2022 – March 2024	Phil Fasciana – guitars; Josh Gibbs – bass, backing vocals; Ronnie Parmer – drums; Deron Miller – guitars, lead vocals	none
March – November 2024	Phil Fasciana – guitars; Ronnie Parmer – drums; Deron Miller – guitars, vocals; Jesse Jolly – bass, vocals	none
November 2024 – March 2025	Phil Fasciana – guitars; Ronnie Parmer – drums; Jesse Jolly – bass, vocals	none
March – November 2025	Phil Fasciana – guitars; Ronnie Parmer – drums; Jesse Jolly – bass, lead vocals; Chris Cannella – guitars, backing vocals	none
November 2025	Phil Fasciana – guitars; Ronnie Parmer – drums; Jesse Jolly – bass, vocals; Chris Cannella – guitars, backing vocals; Deron Miller – vocals, guitars	none to date
