= Ethnic cleansing (disambiguation) =

Ethnic cleansing is the systematic forced removal (e.g. via deportation or genocide) of ethnic, racial and religious groups from a given area, with the intent of making a region ethnically homogeneous.

Ethnic Cleansing may also refer to:

- Ethnic Cleansing (video game)
- "Ethnic Cleansing", a song by Malevolent Creation from Stillborn
