= The Ten Commandments (Malevolent Creation album) =

Studio album by Malevolent Creation
- Released: April 9, 1991
- Recorded: 1990
- Studio: Morrisound Recording, Tampa, Florida
- Genre: Death metal · thrash metal
- Length: 38:17
- Label: Roadrunner
- Producer: Scott Burns

Malevolent Creation chronology
The Ten Commandments (1991)	Retribution (1992)

Professional ratings
Review scores
Source	Rating
AllMusic	4.5/5 stars
Raw	4/5 stars

The Ten Commandments is the debut studio album by American death metal band Malevolent Creation. It was produced and engineered by Scott Burns.

== Track listing ==
All music is composed by Bret Hoffmann and Phil Fasciana.

No.	Title	Length
1.	"Memorial Arrangements"	2:38
2.	"Premature Burial"	3:17
3.	"Remnants of Withered Decay"	3:55
4.	"Multiple Stab Wounds"	3:34
5.	"Impaled Existence"	3:25
6.	"Thou Shall Kill!"	4:31
7.	"Sacrificial Annihilation"	3:24
8.	"Decadence Within"	4:21
9.	"Injected Sufferage [sic]"	3:41
10.	"Malevolent Creation"	5:31
Total length:		38:17

== Personnel ==
- Bret Hoffmann - vocals
- Phil Fasciana - guitar
- Jeff Juszkiewicz - guitar
- Jason Blachowicz - bass
- Mark Simpson - drums
