= Harry Winkler (handballer) =

American handball player

Personal information
- Full name: Harry William Winkler, Jr.
- Nationality: United States
- Born: April 10, 1945 (age 81) Philadelphia, Pennsylvania

Sport
- Sport: Handball
National team
- Years: Team
- 1972 - 1976: U.S. Olympic Team

Harry William Winkler, Jr. (born April 10, 1945) is an American former Olympic handballer and retired school teacher. He was also a member of the U.S. Men's handball team at the 1972 Summer Olympics and the U.S. Men's handball team at the 1976 Summer Olympics and coached the U.S. Women’s Olympic handball team at the 1984 Olympics in Los Angeles. He retired from teaching at Forest Hill Community High School after over 30 years in 2009.

== Early life ==
Winkler was born in Philadelphia. He graduated from Forest Hill High School in West Palm Beach, Florida, in 1963. Winkler attended the University of Florida. Norm Sloan recruited him from Forest Hill Community High School to play basketball for the Gators. After graduation, Winkler served as an officer in the United States Army. It was in the Army that he learned team handball.

== Olympics ==
In 1972, Winkler joined the U.S. Olympic handball team, retiring from active competition in 1977. He competed in the 1972 and 1976 Summer Olympics.

== Honors ==
In 1963, he was named "Athlete of the Week" by WPEC-TV. In 1981, he was inducted into the Palm Beach County Sports Hall of Fame. He was cited for his achievements in basketball, track, and team handball.
