= Retribution (Malevolent Creation album) =

Studio album by Malevolent Creation
- Released: June 30, 1992
- Studio: Criteria Studios, Miami, Florida
- Genre: Death metal
- Length: 34:09
- Label: Roadrunner
- Producer: Scott Burns

Malevolent Creation chronology
The Ten Commandments (1991)	Retribution (1992)	Stillborn (1993)

Professional ratings
Review scores
Source	Rating
AllMusic	link

Retribution is the second studio album by American death metal band Malevolent Creation. It was produced and engineered by Scott Burns. The opening song, "Eve of the Apocalypse", contains the theme music from the 1986 controversial psychological horror/crime film Henry: Portrait of a Serial Killer.

Joe DiVita of Loudwire said "The driving repetition and pace at which the riffs fly is like a streetcleaner of death moving along at a steady crawl, fueled by the Florida natives’ sense of pendular rhythms."

== Track listing ==
All lyrics are written by Bret Hoffmann, all music composed by Malevolent Creation.

No.	Title	Length
1.	"Eve of the Apocalypse"	4:21
2.	"Systematic Execution"	3:28
3.	"Slaughter of Innocence"	3:45
4.	"Coronation of Our Domain"	5:06
5.	"No Flesh Shall Be Spared"	4:26
6.	"The Coldest Survive"	3:18
7.	"Monster"	2:40
8.	"Mindlock"	3:06
9.	"Iced"	3:59
Total length:		34:09

== Personnel ==
Malevolent Creation

- Bret Hoffmann – vocals
- Rob Barrett – guitar
- Phil Fasciana – guitar
- Jason Blachowicz – bass
- Alex Marquez – drums

Guest musicians

- James Murphy – second guitar solo on "Coronation of Our Domain"

Production

- Scott Burns – engineer, producer, mixing
- Mark Gruber – assistant engineer
- Mike Fuller – mastering

Artwork

- Mark Douglas – photography
- Dan Seagrave – cover art
- Jeff "Big Jeff" Juszkiewicz – logo
- Jason Blachowicz – logo

Additional staff

- Monte Conner – A&R
- Mitchell Karduna – booking
- Scott Hecker – management
