= Dave Culross =

American drummer

Dave Culross (born March 9, 1975) is an American drummer from Rochester, New York. He was a member of the death metal bands Malevolent Creation, Suffocation, and Hate Plow, and recorded for several other acts.

== Influences ==
In the early days of his playing, Culross cited Alex Van Halen, Frankie Banali, Charlie Benante, Lars Ulrich and Dave Lombardo as his primary influences. However, as he got older, the influences included Sean Reinert, Steve Smith, Vinnie Colaiuta, Bobby Jarzombek, Gene Hoglan, and Kai Hahto.

== Discography ==
Artist	Title	Release
Phantasmagoria	Demo 1990	1990
Disgorged	Breed for Me	1992
Disgorged	Thy Hideous Wake	1993
Disgorged	Promo Tape 1994	1994
Malevolent Creation	Eternal	1995
Malevolent Creation	Joe Black	1996
Malevolent Creation	The Fine Art of Murder	1998
Suffocation	Despise the Sun	1998
HatePlow	The Only Law is Survival	2000
Incantation	The Infernal Storm	2000
Gorgasm	Bleeding Profusely	2000
HatePlow	Moshpit Murder	2001
Malevolent Creation	Envenomed	2001
Disgorged	The Unspeakable Revived / Abolish in Thorns	2002
Malevolent Creation	Envenomed II	2002
Malevolent Creation	Manifestation	2003
Malevolent Creation	Warkult	2004
Malevolent Creation	Doomsday X	2007
Malevolent Creation	Live at The Whiskey A Go-Go	2008
Suffocation	Pinnacle of Bedlam	2013
Pyrexia	Feast of Iniquity (tracks 1, 3, 7, 10)	2013
