= Forest Hill Community High School =

Magnet school in Florida, United States

Coordinates: 26.6545113°N 80.0644861°W

Location
- 6901 Parker Avenue; West Palm Beach, Florida, 33405; United States

Information
- Type: Public (magnet) secondary
- Established: 1958
- School district: Palm Beach County School District
- Superintendent: Donald Fennoy
- Principal: Mary Stratos
- Teaching staff: 116.50 (FTE)
- Grades: 9–12
- Enrollment: 2,108 (2023–2024)
- Colors: Red, white, black & blue
- Mascot: Falcon
- Nickname: The Hill
- Newspaper: The Talon
- Yearbook: Gauntlet
- Website: https://fhhs.palmbeachschools.org/

Forest Hill Community High School (FHCHS) also known as Forest Hill or The Hill, is a coeducational public high school in West Palm Beach, Florida with an enrollment of 2,457 students. The school is a part of the School District of Palm Beach County.

== History ==
Original building

The school opened as Forest Hill High School in 1959; it is situated next to the West Palm Beach Country Club and I-95 in the southwestern corner of the City of West Palm Beach on a compact 17.38-acre (70,300 m^{2}) tract. A larger building replaced the original structure on the same site in 2004. The school was first accredited in 1961. In the 1980s, the Palm Beach County School Board added the word Community to the names of all public high schools. Forest Hill is a public school for students in the local community, and for those coming from afar to the magnet programs held at the school.

== Academics ==
The school's attendance boundaries encompass a culturally diverse area with a high percentage of non-native speakers of English. In order to expand the opportunities available to its student body, the school initiated many magnet programs: Information Technology, International Baccalaureate, Environmental Science, Engineering, Tourism and Hospitality, Criminal Justice and Junior Reserve Officers' Training Corps. In 2008, the Tourism and Hospitality magnet program introduced a marketing club, DECA, into its program; and in 2009, the club opened up the school's first alternative breakfast cafe called Falcon Cafe, run by its members and officers.

The school also offers English for Speakers of Other Languages (ESOL) and Exceptional Student Education (ESE). The basic classes are: English, Math, Social Studies, Science, Foreign Language, Art, Physical Education, Culinary, and Woodwork.

== Athletics ==
- Football: Varsity & Junior Varsity Runner up 1986 & 1987
- Football Cheerleading: Varsity & Junior Varsity
- Basketball Cheerleading: Varsity & Junior Varsity
- Swimming: Boys & Girls
- Boys Volleyball: Varsity & Junior Varsity
- Girls Volleyball: Varsity & Junior Varsity
- Bowling: Boys & Girls
- Tennis: Boys & Girls
- Baseball: Varsity & Junior Varsity
- Cross Country: Boys & Girls
- Track: Boys & Girls
- Softball
- Flag football
- Boys Soccer: Varsity & Junior Varsity
- Girls Soccer: Varsity & Junior Varsity
- Boys Basketball: Varsity & Junior Varsity
- Girls Basketball: Varsity & Junior Varsity
- Boys Wrestling: Varsity & Junior Varsity
- Girls Wrestling: Varsity & Junior Varsity

The school ended their 37-game football losing streak on October 23, 2009. The Varsity Falcons beat Spanish River 12-7. They had the longest losing streak in the state with 43 games from 1999-2003. The win was only fifth in the decade for Forest Hill. The game was won on Forest Hill's Senior night, the last home football game for the 2009-2010 season, except for the homecoming game, which was held on November 6, 2009.

== School rating ==
School Grades
Year	School Grade
1999	C
2000	D
2001	D
2002	F
2003	C
2004	C
2005	B
2006	C
2007	C
2008	C
2009	C
2010	C
2011	C
2012	C
2013	C
2014	C
2015	C
2016	C
2017	C
2018	C
2019	C
2020	C
2021	C

== Notable alumni ==
- Stephanie Abrams, meteorologist who joined at The Weather Channel in 2003
- Ottis Anderson, National Football League player who earned Most Valuable Player honors at the 1991 Super Bowl (Class of 1975)
- Susan Backlinie, stuntwoman and animal trainer, best known as the shark attack victim in the opening scene of Jaws (Class of 1964)
- Jeff Fischer, former Major League Baseball player (Montreal Expos, Los Angeles Dodgers) (Class of 1981)
- Eddie Gaillard, Major League Baseball player (Class of 1988)
- Jarrod Jablonski, technical diver and record-setting cave diver (Class of 1987)
- Jorge Labarga, Justice of the Florida Supreme Court
- Aaron Neubert, Los Angeles based architect and educator; founding principal of ANX and Fellow of the American Institute of Architects (Class of 1989)
- Kevin Patrick, college football coach (Class of 1989)
- J.P. Soars, blues singer, guitarist, songwriter and record producer. In 2021, he was nominated for a Blues Music Award in the 'Contemporary Blues Male Artist' category.
- Ken Stone, National Football League player (Class of 1968)
- Robby Thompson, Major League Baseball player (Class of 1980)
- Harry Winkler, University of Florida basketball player 1965-67, 1972 and 1976 US Olympic Handball player (Class of 1963)
- Mike Wood, former Major League Baseball player (Oakland Athletics, Kansas City Royals, Texas Rangers) (Class of 1998)
