= Conquering South America =

Live album by Malevolent Creation
- Released: September 21, 2004
- Recorded: Brazil Live Tour 2003
- Genre: Death metal
- Length: 59:58
- Label: Artic Music Group

Malevolent Creation chronology
Warkult (2004)	Conquering South America (2004)	Doomsday X (2007)

Professional ratings
Review scores
Source	Rating
Allmusic	3.5/5 stars

Conquering South America is the first live album by Florida death metal band Malevolent Creation.

== Track listing ==
No.	Title	Length
1.	"Eve Of The Apocalypse"	4:26
2.	"Multiple Stab Wounds"	3:26
3.	"Manic Demise"	3:16
4.	"Blood Brothers"	4:35
5.	"Kill Zone"	3:57
6.	"Rebirth Of Terror"	3:39
7.	"Slaughter Of Innocence"	3:56
8.	"To Die Is At Hand"	3:47
9.	"Coronation Of Our Domain"	5:21
10.	"Monster"	2:43
11.	"All That Remains"	4:07
12.	"Alliance Or War"	4:35
13.	"Infernal Desire"	3:19
14.	"Living In Fear"	3:15
15.	"Malevolent Creation"	5:36
Total length:		59:58

== Personnel ==
- Kyle Symons - vocals
- Phil Fasciana - guitar
- Rob Barrett - guitar
- Gordon Simms - bass
- Tony Laureano - drums
