= Malevolent Creation =

American death metal band

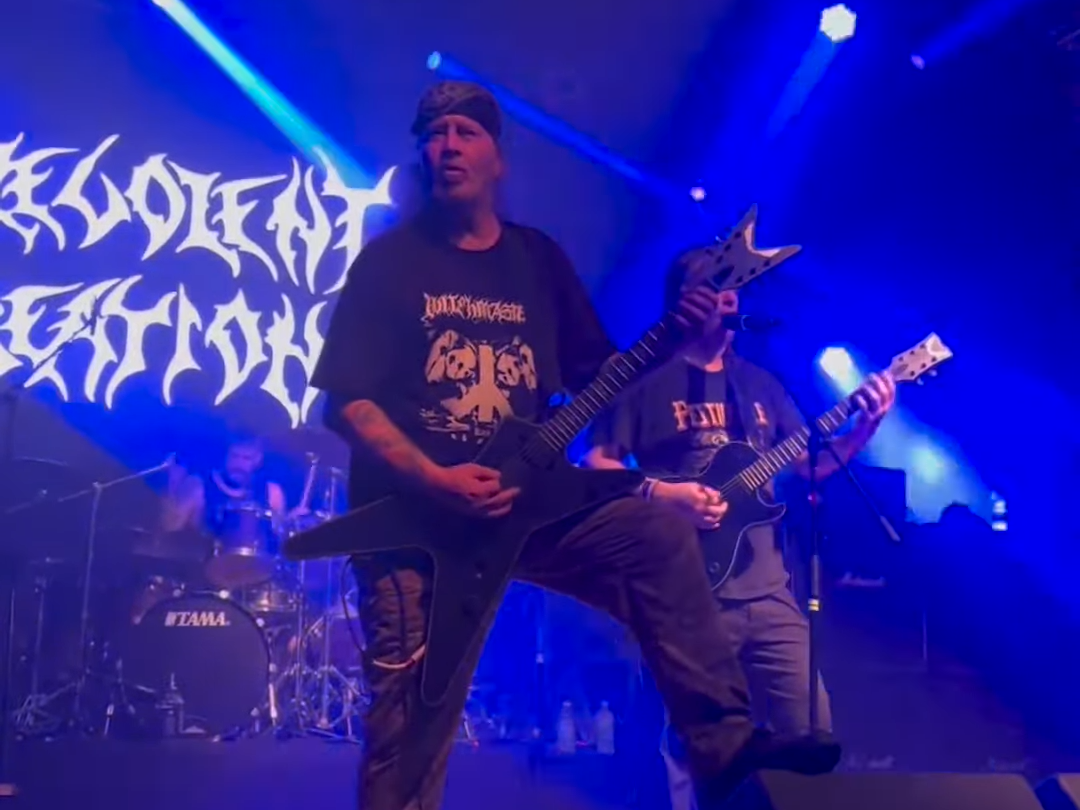
- Malevolent Creation performing in 2023

Background information
- Origin: Buffalo, New York, U.S.
- Genre: Death metal
- Years active: 1987–present
- Labels: Nuclear Blast; Pavement; Roadrunner; Century Media
- Members: Deron Miller; Phil Fasciana; Ron Parmer
- Past members: List
- Website: Malevolent Creation on Facebook

Malevolent Creation is an American death metal band formed in Buffalo, New York in 1987 and later based in Fort Lauderdale, Florida. The band's original members were guitarists Phil Fasciana and Jim Nickles and vocalist Bret Hoffmann, who were joined by bassist Jason Blachowicz and drummer Dennis Kubas the following year. Fasciana remains the band's sole consistent member.

The band moved to Fort Lauderdale a year after it formed, and they became a part of the emergent local death metal scene, landing a deal with Roadrunner Records and helping to develop the Florida death metal sound. In 1991 their debut album, The Ten Commandments, became something of a landmark in the death metal underground, expanding on the early work of bands such as Slayer, Kreator, Possessed, Onslaught, Obituary, and Death.

According to Joe DiVita of Loudwire, "Malevolent Creation entrenched themselves as one of death metal's charter bands – rarely driving the music's evolution, but reliably championing and defending it against all challengers."

== History ==
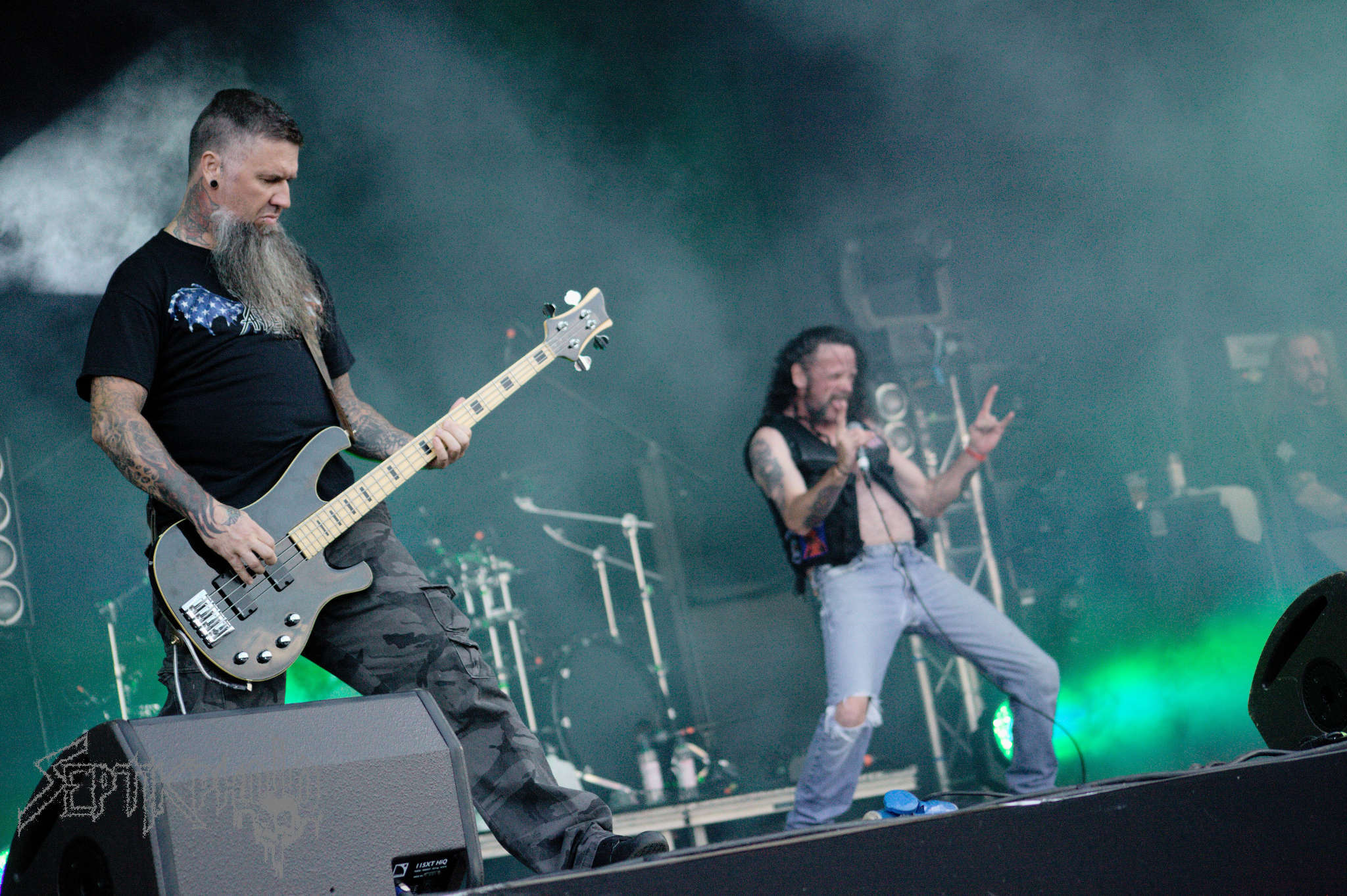
Original members Jason Blachowicz, Bret Hoffmann and Phil Fasciana (far right, background) performing in 2014.

Malevolent Creation formed in 1987 out of Buffalo, New York with the original lineup of Phil Fasciana and Jim Nickles on guitars, Bret Hoffmann on vocals, Jason Blachowicz on bass and Dennis Kubas on drums. Soon thereafter, the band created a demo tape, which they produced 100 copies of. Following the success of this original demo, the band moved from New York to Florida and prepped the release of their sophomore demo, pressing 1000 copies. With the new demo, Jon Rubin and Mark Simpson replaced Nickles and Kubas respectively. Following the demo, the band prepared a third demo, which eventually got them signed to Roadrunner Records, who would go on to put out their debut album The Ten Commandments in 1991.

Following the album's release, the band's lineup shifted, with Rubin and Simpson departing and the band hiring Solstice members Rob Barrett and Alex Marquez.

Malevolent Creation toured with Cannibal Corpse, Obituary and Agnostic Front on the Complete Control Tour in 1992. That same year, the band recorded and released their sophomore album, Retribution. In 1993, the band released Stillborn, with Rubin returning to the second guitar position in place of Barrett. The album was supposed to see Marquez be replaced by "Crazy" Larry Hawke. However, Hawke ended up incarcerated with a DUI charge, which saw Marquez remaining with the band. Following the release of Stillborn, Hoffman departed from the band, with Blachowicz taking over vocal duties while maintaining his position as bassist.

Marquez also departed from the band at this time, with Disgorged drummer Dave Culross taking over the position. With the lineup of Blachowicz, Rubin, Fasciana, and Culross, the band recorded and released their fourth album, Eternal. According to Fasciana, the label, Pavement Music, could not afford to let them record at Morrisound Recording, like their previous records. Fasciana stated that following the album, the drummer situation was "real weird". Derek Roddy came into the band at this time, due to his friendship with Blachowicz. Fasciana, Blachowicz and Roddy were joined by guitarist John Paul Soars for the band's fifth album, In Cold Blood, which premiered through Pavement Music in 1997. However, following the album's release, Blachowicz and Roddy entered into an altercation, which resulted in both quitting the band and moving out of the apartment they shared.

Fasciana had managed to rehire Hoffman, Barrett, and Culross, with Gordon Simms joining as their bassist. The band approached their sixth album, The Fine Art of Murder, which was hailed as their best work yet. However, Fasciana stated he was not impressed with Hoffman's performance on the release and that it "wasn't coming from the heart". In 2000, the band released their seventh album, Envenomed, with the same lineup, through Arctic Music. The band worked with local producer and engineer Jeremy Staska (New Found Glory, Shai Hulud, Strongarm). The process for the album was slower than they were used to, which allowed them time to work on the release more, which Fasciana appreciated. He noted that the vocals required a great deal of time, with Barrett and Hoffman collaborating to bring them to fruition. Envenomed II came later, which saw the album remastered with a Dark Angel cover.

After the release, Hoffman had left the band, while Kyle Simons was brought in. Justin DiPinto joined as their drummer at that time as well. The band with the lineup quickly embarked on a tour with Marduk for 30 dates, before moving on to another tour with Immolation and Aborted. Once the band returned from the tour, the band recorded and released their eighth album, The Will to Kill, in 2002. In 2004, Dave Culross returned to the band and recorded Warkult, the band's ninth album. In 2007, with the band's longest gap between albums, they released their tenth album, Doomsday X. Fasciana notes that the band's members were scattered across the country during the writing process, which made things difficult. This album saw the return of Hoffman on vocals, Blachowicz on bass, and Rubin on guitar, while Fasciana and Culross remained from the prior lineup. The band also had a guest performance by Mick Thomson of Slipknot.

Malevolent Creation signed a management deal with Extreme Management Group (Suffocation, Origin) in 2010 and announced April 5, 2010, as the starting date for recording their next album with Erik Rutan at Mana Recording Studios (Cannibal Corpse, Vital Remains, Goatwhore, etc.)

With Rios and guitarist Gio Geraca in the band, Malevolent Creation began working on their eleventh album, Invidious Dominion, which came out through Nuclear Blast on August 24, 2010. Rios had a large hand in the production of the album, as well.

Malevolent Creation signed a worldwide record deal with Century Media Records in 2014. Their 12th studio album, Dead Man's Path, was released in October 2015. In September 2016, it was reported that the band had broken up following the cancellation of their upcoming U.S. tour, and departure of their long-time bassist Jason Blachowicz. Phil Fasciana is the only remaining member left. In November 2017, it was announced that Malevolent Creation had returned with a new lineup and an upcoming album to be released next year. Original vocalist Bret Hoffmann died from colon cancer on July 7, 2018, at the age of 51.

After the death of Hoffman, Fasciana continued with the band and they recorded their 13th studio album, known as The 13th Beast, with a whole new lineup, including Josh Gibbs on bass, Lee Wollenschlaeger on guitar and vocals, and Phillip Cancilla on drums. The album was released on January 18, 2019, through Century Media Records.

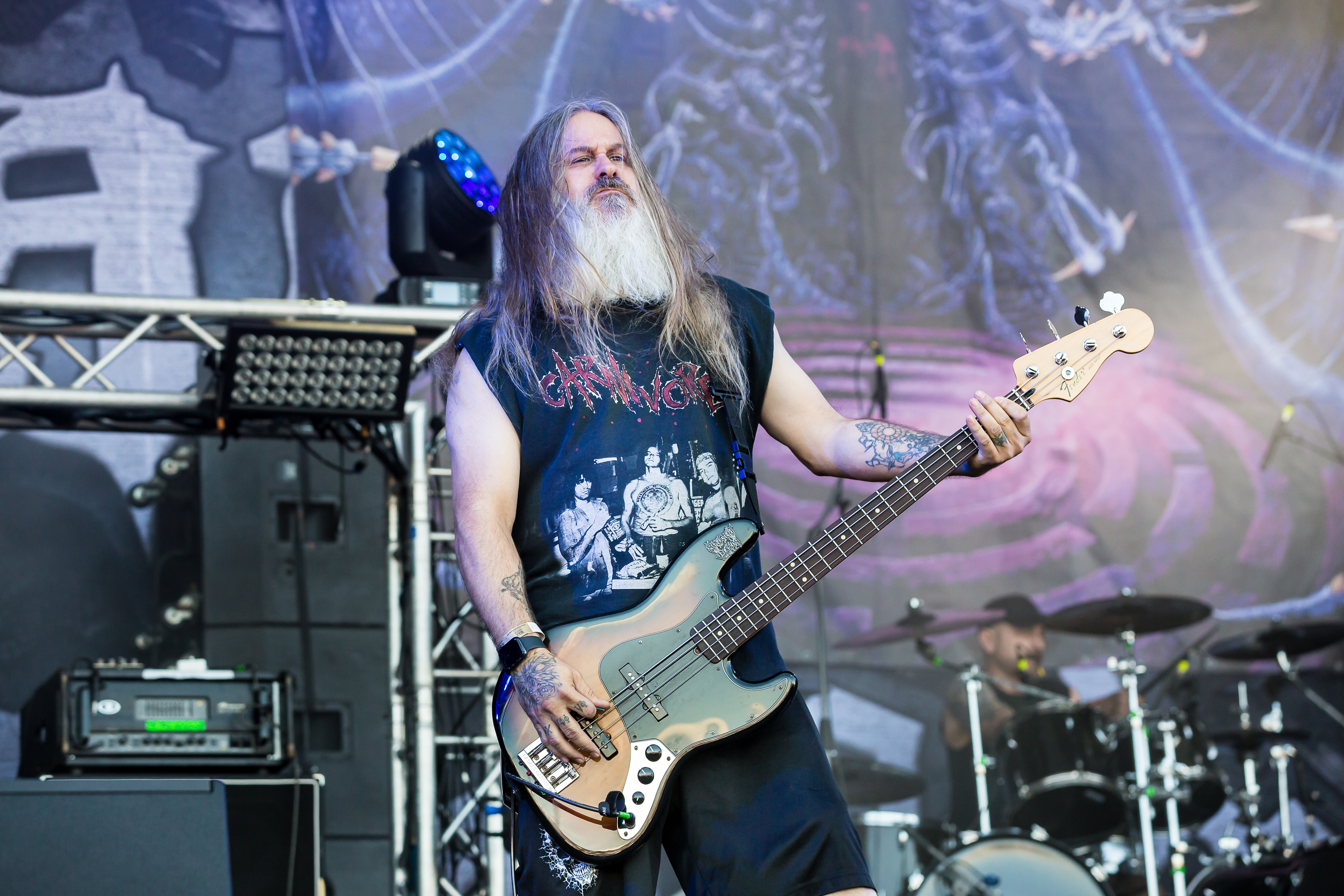
New members Josh Gibbs and Ronnie Parmer performing in 2022

In October 2022, former CKY frontman Deron Miller joined the band as the new guitarist and vocalist. With the change in lineup, the band began writing their fourteenth album, with new drummer Ronnie Parmer.

In March 2024, it was announced that bassist Josh Gibbs had left the band and was replaced with Jesse Jolly. Although Jolly was brought into the band as the new bassist, he would also become the new lead vocalist of the band as well after the September 2024 departure of Deron Miller. Malevolent Creation became a three-piece for the first time in the band's history during this period and remained as such until it was announced that former Deicide guitarist Chris Cannella had joined the band.

On July 16, 2025, Fasciana was admitted to the hospital with bacterial pneumonia, he was subsequently put in a medically induced coma for eight days and was in the hospital for three weeks.

On November 29, 2025, Malevolent Creation announced that Deron Miller was rejoining the band and they would be spending most of 2026 focusing work on their upcoming fourteenth studio album Return Fire.

== Members ==
Current members

- Phil Fasciana – guitars (1986–present)
- Ronnie Parmer – drums (2020–present)
- Deron Miller – vocals, guitars (2022–2024, 2025–present)

== Discography ==
=== Studio albums ===
- The Ten Commandments (1991)
- Retribution (1992)
- Stillborn (1993)
- Eternal (1995)
- In Cold Blood (1997)
- The Fine Art of Murder (1998)
- Envenomed (2000)
- The Will to Kill (2002)
- Warkult (2004)
- Doomsday X (2007)
- Invidious Dominion (2010)
- Dead Man's Path (2015)
- The 13th Beast (2019)
- Return Fire (TBA)

=== Live albums ===
- Conquering South America (2004)
- Live at the Whiskey (2008)
- Australian Onslaught (2010)

=== Compilations ===
- At Death's Door II "Piece by Piece" (Slayer Cover) (Roadrunner, 2009)
- Joe Black (Pavement Music, 1996)
- Manifestation – Compilation (Pavement Music, 2000)
- The Best of Malevolent Creation (Roadrunner, 2003)
- Retrospective (Crash Music, 2005)
- Essentials (Crash Music, 2009)

=== DVD ===
- Lost Commandments (Massacre Records, 2008) – It was an Arctic Music release that was licensed to Massacre Records for European release

=== Music videos ===
- "Slaughter House" (2010)
- "Target Rich Environment" (2012)
- "Mandatory Butchery" (2018)
- "Decimated" (2018)
- "Release the Soul" (2019)
