= Dead Man's Path =

Studio album by Malevolent Creation
- Released: October 2, 2015
- Studio: Recording Studio, Ft. Lauderdale, Florida (guitars and bass); Recording Studio, Mahopac, New York (drums); Shredly Studios, North Tonawanda, New York (vocals)
- Genre: Death metal
- Length: 44:34
- Label: Century Media
- Producer: Dan Swanö

Malevolent Creation chronology
Invidious Dominion (2010)	Dead Man's Path (2015)	The 13th Beast (2019)

Professional ratings
Review scores
Source	Rating
About.com	4/5 stars
Rock n Reel Reviews	4.5/5 stars
Terrorizer	6.5/10

Dead Man's Path is the twelfth studio album by American death metal band Malevolent Creation. It was released on October 2, 2015, and their first record to be released on Century Media Records. It is also the final album to feature original vocalist Bret Hoffmann before he left the band the following year and his subsequent death from colon cancer in 2018.

== Track listing ==
All lyrics are written by Brett Hoffmann.

No.	Title	Music	Length
1.	"Dead Man's Path"	Phil Fasciana, Justin DiPinto, Gio Geraca	4:51
2.	"Soul Razer"	Fasciana, DiPinto, Geraca	4:01
3.	"Imperium (Kill Force Rising)"	Fasciana, DiPinto, Geraca	6:09
4.	"Corporate Weaponry"	Fasciana	3:55
5.	"Blood of the Fallen"	Fasciana	4:52
6.	"Resistance Is Victory"	Geraca, DiPinto	3:47
7.	"12th Prophecy"	Fasciana	4:14
8.	"Extinction Personified"	Fasciana	4:10
9.	"Fragmental Sanity"	Fasciana	4:08
10.	"Face Your Fear"	Fasciana	4:24
Total length:			44:34

== Credits and personnel ==
Malevolent Creation

- Brett Hoffmann - vocals
- Gio Geraca - guitars
- Phil Fasciana - guitars
- Jason Blachowicz - bass
- Justin DiPinto - drums

Other staff

- Julian Hollowell - recording (guitars, bass)
- Eliot Geller - recording (drums)
- Jim Nickles - recording (vocals)
- German Latorres - artwork
- Dan Swanö - production, mixing
