= Joe Black (album) =

Compilation album by Malevolent Creation
- Released: October 9, 1996
- Genre: Death metal
- Length: 37:54
- Label: Pavement Music

Malevolent Creation chronology
Eternal (1995)	Joe Black (1996)	In Cold Blood (1997)

Joe Black is a compilation album by Florida death metal band Malevolent Creation. It was released on October 9, 1996 via Pavement Music. The first 2 songs on the album were originally written for the band "HatePlow" which mostly consisted of members of Malevolent Creation. There were plans for live recordings to be on the album after the first three songs but Phil Fasciana didn't like the live tapes he had at the time.

== Track listing ==
No.	Title	Lyrics	Music	Length
1.	"Joe Black"	Blachowicz	Fasciana	3:34
2.	"Self-Important Freak"	Rob Barrett	Fasciana, Rob Barrett	2:39
3.	"Sadistic Perversity"	Blachowicz	Blachowicz	3:20
4.	"No Salvation" (remix)	Jason Blachowicz	Phil Fasciana, Jon Rubin	4:06
5.	"To Kill" (remix)	Blachowicz	Fasciana, Rubin	3:50
6.	"Tasteful Agony" (remix)	Peter Lilienthal	Fasciana	3:42
7.	"Genetic Affliction"	Brett Hoffman	Fasciana	4:38
8.	"Raining Blood" (Slayer cover)	Jeff Hanneman, Kerry King	Jeff Hanneman	3:47
9.	"Remnants Of Withered Decay"	Hoffman	Fasciana	3:57
10.	"Impaled Existence"	Hoffman	Fasciana	3:21
Total length:				37:54
