= The Will to Kill =

Studio album by Malevolent Creation
- Released: November 5, 2002
- Recorded: Mana Studio, Tampa
- Genre: Death metal
- Length: 41:33
- Label: Arctic Music, Nuclear Blast
- Producer: Malevolent Creation

Malevolent Creation chronology
Envenomed (2000)	The Will to Kill (2002)	Warkult (2004)

The Will to Kill is the eighth studio album by Florida death metal band Malevolent Creation. The U.S. and UK album covers are alternate.

The album was rated a 4.75 out of 5 by The Metal Crypt.

== Track listing ==
No.	Title	Lyrics	Music	Length
1.	"The Will to Kill"	Kyle Symons	Phil Fasciana	3:58
2.	"Pillage and Burn"	Rob Barrett	Rob Barrett	2:21
3.	"All That Remains"	Symons	Fasciana	3:55
4.	"With Murderous Precision"	Symons	Fasciana	3:49
5.	"Lifeblood"	Symons	Fasciana	3:31
6.	"Assassin Squad"	Barrett	Barrett	3:05
7.	"Rebirth of Terror"	Symons	Fasciana	3:34
8.	"Superior Firepower"	Barrett	Fasciana, Barrett, Gordon Simms	3:34
9.	"Divide and Conquer"	Symons	Fasciana	4:58
10.	"The Cardinal's Law"	Symons	Fasciana	5:18
11.	"Burnt Beyond Recognition"	Barrett	Barrett	3:30
Total length:				41:33

== Personnel ==
Malevolent Creation

- Kyle Symons - vocals
- Rob Barrett - lead guitars
- Phil Fasciana - lead guitars
- Gordon Simms - bass
- Justin DiPinto - drums

Additional musician(s)

- James Murphy - guitar solo on "Assassin Squad"
- Shawn Ohtani - guitar solo on "All That Remains"

Production

- Jean-Francois Dagenais - Mixing
- Shawn Ohtani - Engineering
- Travis Smith - Cover art
- Robert Cardenas - Layout
