= Envenomed =

Studio album by Malevolent Creation
- Released: October 17, 2000
- Studio: Studio 13, Deerfield Beach, Florida, United States
- Genre: Death metal
- Length: 41:43
- Label: Arctic Music
- Producer: Jeremy Staska

Malevolent Creation chronology
Manifestation (2000)	Envenomed (2000)	The Will to Kill (2002)

Envenomed is the seventh studio album by Florida death metal band Malevolent Creation. The band also released a re-issue album entitled Envenomed II.

== Track listing ==
No.	Title	Lyrics	Music	Length
1.	"Homicidal Rant"	Bret Hoffmann	Phil Fasciana	3:28
2.	"Night of the Long Knives"	Hoffmann	Fasciana	3:07
3.	"Kill Zone"	Hoffmann	Rob Barrett, Fasciana	3:54
4.	"Halved"	Hoffmann	Fasciana	4:07
5.	"Serial Dementia"	Hoffmann	Fasciana	3:11
6.	"Bloodline Severed"	Hoffmann	Fasciana	5:11
7.	"Pursuit Revised"	Hoffmann	Fasciana	4:11
8.	"Conflict"	Hoffmann	Fasciana, Gordon Simms	3:35
9.	"Viral Release"	Hoffmann	Barrett, Fasciana	3:41
10.	"The Deviant's March"	Barrett, Hoffmann	Barrett	2:59
11.	"Envenomed"	Hoffmann	Fasciana	4:19
Total length:				41:43

Envenomed II Re-issue Edition
No.	Title	Lyrics	Music	Length
12.	"Perish in Flames" (Dark Angel cover)	Don Doty	Jim Durkin	4:59
13.	"Epileptic Seizure"	Jason Blachowicz	Fasciana	2:46
14.	"Confirmed Kill"			1:54

== Personnel ==
- Brett Hoffmann - vocals
- Rob Barrett - guitar
- Phil Fasciana - guitar
- Gordon Simms - bass
- Dave Culross - drums
- Gus Rios - drums on "Conflict"
- Kyle Symons - additional vocals
