= Doomsday X =

Studio album by Malevolent Creation
- Released: July 17, 2007
- Recorded: 2006–2007
- Studio: Mercury Recording Studio; (Pompano Beach, Florida)
- Genre: Death metal
- Length: 49:18
- Label: Nuclear Blast (US); Massacre (EU)
- Producer: Malevolent Creation

Malevolent Creation chronology
Warkult (2004)	Doomsday X (2007)	Invidious Dominion (2010)

Professional ratings
Review scores
Source	Rating
About.com	3/5 stars
AllMusic	3/5 stars
Blabbermouth	8.5/10 stars

Doomsday X is the tenth studio album by the American death metal band Malevolent Creation. It was released via Nuclear Blast America on July 17, 2007, and was released in Europe on August 24, 2007 via Massacre Records.

== Track listing ==
No.	Title	Lyrics	Music	Length
1.	"Cauterized"	Brett Hoffman		3:48
2.	"Culture of Doubt"			4:18
3.	"Deliver My Enemy"			5:25
4.	"Archaic"	Jason Blachowicz	Jason Blachowicz	3:09
5.	"Buried in a Nameless Grave"	Blachowicz	Blachowicz	3:46
6.	"Dawn of Defeat"		Jon Rubin	3:37
7.	"Prelude to Doomsday"			3:32
8.	"Upon Their Cross"			4:45
9.	"Strength in Numbers"			4:57
10.	"Hallowed"		Jon Rubin, Gus Rios	4:34
11.	"Unleash Hell"		Rubin	3:28
12.	"Bio-Terror"			3:59

All the music was written by Phil Fasciana and lyrics by Brett Hoffman except where noted

== Personnel ==
- Bret Hoffmann – vocals
- Phil Fasciana – guitar
- Jon Rubin – guitar
- Jason Blachowicz – bass
- Dave Culross – drums
- Mick Thomson – second guitar solo (track 3 only)

== Production ==
- Arranged and produced by Malevolent Creation
- Recorded by Gus Rios
- Mixed by Gus Rios and Matt LaPlant
- Mastered by Alan Douches
