= The Fine Art of Murder =

Studio album by Malevolent Creation
- Released: October 27, 1998
- Studio: Qualitone Studios, Beach Park, Illinois
- Genre: Death metal
- Length: 56:40
- Label: Pavement Music

Malevolent Creation chronology
In Cold Blood (1997)	The Fine Art of Murder (1998)	Manifestation (2000)

The Fine Art of Murder is the sixth studio album by Florida death metal band Malevolent Creation. It was released on October 27, 1998 via Pavement Music. Phil Fasciana and Rob Barrett originally planned to do all the bass tracks on the album but Brett Hoffman convinced them to let Gordon Simms join the band.

== Track listing ==
No.	Title	Lyrics	Music	Length
1.	"To Die is at Hand"	Bret Hoffmann	Phil Fasciana	3:38
2.	"Manic Demise"	Hoffmann	Fasciana, Rob Barrett	3:02
3.	"Instinct Evolved"	Hoffmann	Fasciana, Barrett	4:43
4.	"Dissect the Eradicated"	Hoffmann	Gus Rios	3:15
5.	"Mass Graves"	Hoffmann	Fasciana	6:18
6.	"The Fine Art of Murder"	Hoffmann	Fasciana	5:52
7.	"Bone Exposed"	Hoffmann	Fasciana	3:34
8.	"Purge"	Hoffmann	Rios	2:47
9.	"Fracture"	Hoffmann	Fasciana	6:34
10.	"Rictus Surreal"	Hoffmann	Rios, Fasciana	4:30
11.	"Scorn"	Hoffmann	Fasciana	3:11
12.	"Day of Lamentation"	Hoffmann	Fasciana	7:04
13.	"Scattered Flesh"	Hoffmann	Rios	2:12
Total length:				56:40

== Personnel ==
- Bret Hoffmann - vocals
- Rob Barrett - guitar
- Phil Fasciana - guitar, keyboards on "The Fine Art Of Murder"
- Gordon Simms - bass
- Dave Culross - drums
