= Stillborn (album) =

1993 studio album by Malevolent Creation

Studio album by Malevolent Creation
- Released: October 26, 1993
- Studio: Pro Media Studios, Gainesville, Florida
- Genre: Death metal
- Length: 42:29
- Label: Roadrunner
- Producer: Mark Pinske

Malevolent Creation chronology
Retribution (1992)	Stillborn (1993)	Eternal (1995)

Stillborn is the third studio album by American death metal band Malevolent Creation, released in 1993 on Roadrunner Records.

== Background ==
Larry Hawke from the band HatePlow originally played drums on the album but Phil wanted the drum tracks re-done; Alex Marquez ended up playing on the album due to Larry's incarceration for a DUI. Roadrunner also requested that Brett to re-do his vocals but the band could not get him to and Roadrunner ended up dropping the band from their label. They ended up getting licensing deals for the subsequent labels they dealt with. In 2024, the band retains rights to all their post-Roadrunner albums.

== Track listing ==
All lyrics are written by Bret Hoffmann, all music composed by Phil Fasciana, except where noted.

No.	Title	Lyrics	Music	Length
1.	"Dominated Resurgency"			4:16
2.	"The Way of All Flesh"		Jon Rubin, Phil Fasciana	4:25
3.	"Dominion of Terror"			4:32
4.	"Geared For Gain"		Phil Fasciana, Jon Rubin	3:05
5.	"Stillborn"			4:44
6.	"Ordain the Hierarchy"			2:47
7.	"Carnivorous Misgivings"			3:17
8.	"Genetic Affliction"			4:41
9.	"Ethnic Cleansing"			4:23
10.	"Disciple of Abhorrence"	Brett Hoffmann, Peter Lilienthal	Phil Fasciana, Jon Rubin	6:19
Total length:				42:29

== Personnel ==
Malevolent Creation

- Bret Hoffmann - vocals
- Jon Rubin - guitar
- Phil Fasciana - guitar, producer
- Alex Marquez - drums
- Jason Blachowicz - bass, logo

Guest musicians

- Dave Smadbeck - keyboards, samples

Production

- Mark Pinske - executive producer, mixing, engineering, recording
- Eddy Schreyer - mastering

Artwork

- Dan Seagrave - cover art
- Jeff Juszkiewicz - logo
- SMAY - art direction
