= Invidious Dominion =

Studio album by Malevolent Creation
- Released: August 24, 2010
- Recorded: Mana Recording Studios, St. Petersburg, Florida
- Genre: Death metal
- Length: 35:54
- Label: Nuclear Blast (USA); Massacre Records (European)
- Producer: Erik Rutan

Malevolent Creation chronology
Doomsday X (2007)	Invidious Dominion (2010)	Dead Man's Path (2015)

Professional ratings
Review scores
Source	Rating
AllMusic	3.5/5 stars
About.com	3.5/5 stars
Blistering	8.5/10 stars
Chronicles of Chaos	10/10 stars

Invidious Dominion is the eleventh studio album by the Floridian death metal band Malevolent Creation. It was released in North America on August 24, 2010 via Nuclear Blast, and in Europe on August 27. A music video was created for "Slaughter House", directed by Chris Cullari. It was released on November 17, 2010 via YouTube.

== Track listing ==
No.	Title	Length
1.	"Intro"	0:33
2.	"United Hate"	3:31
3.	"Conflict Finalized"	3:31
4.	"Slaughter House"	4:11
5.	"Compulsive Face Breaker"	3:18
6.	"Leadspitter"	3:23
7.	"Target Rich Environment"	3:38
8.	"Antagonized"	3:39
9.	"Born Again Hard"	3:16
10.	"Corruptor"	3:52
11.	"Invidious Dominion"	3:01
Total length:		35:54

Limited edition bonus tracks
No.	Title	Length
12.	"Blood Brothers (live)"	3:59
13.	"Manic Demise (live)"	3:12
Total length:		42:05

== Personnel ==
- Bret Hoffmann - vocals
- Gio Geraca - guitars
- Phil Fasciana - guitars
- Jason Blachowicz - bass
- Gus Rios - drums
