= J.P. Soars =

American singer

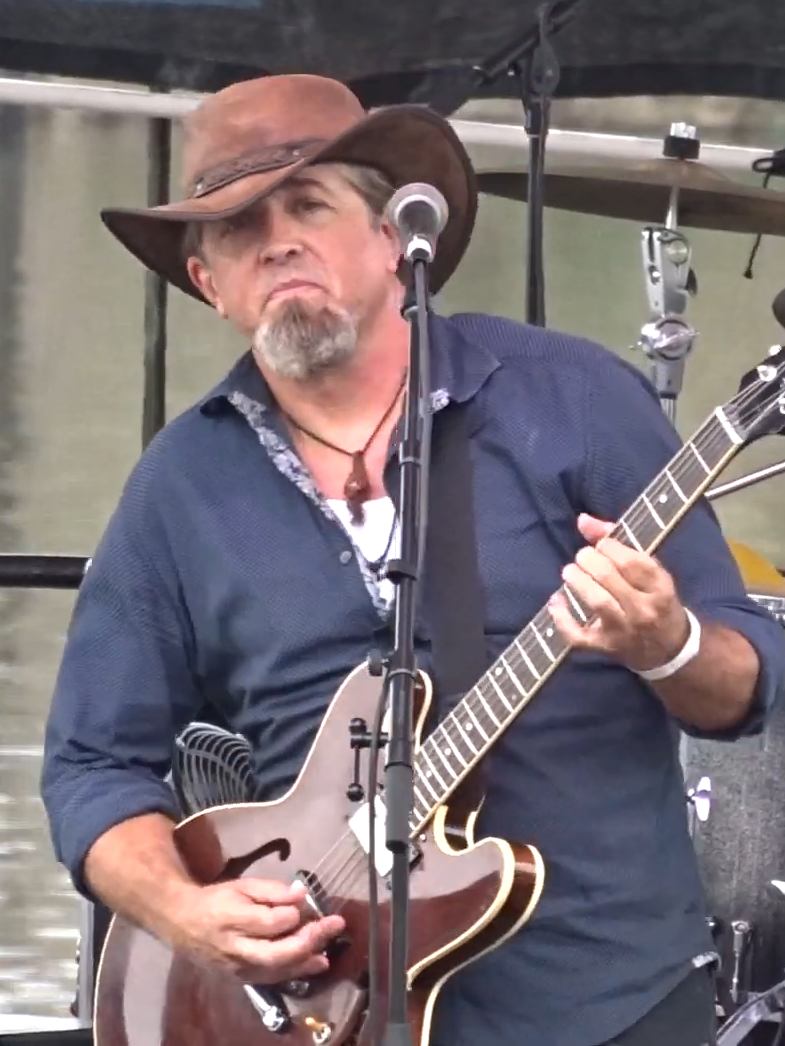
- Soars in 2021

Background information
- Born: John Paul Soars; 1969 (age 56–57); Anaheim, California, United States
- Genres: Blues (previously thrash metal, death metal and jazz)
- Occupations: Singer, guitarist, songwriter, record producer
- Instruments: Vocals, guitar
- Years active: Late 1980s–present
- Website: Official website

John Paul Soars (born 1969) and known professionally as J.P. Soars, is an American blues singer, guitarist, songwriter and record producer. In 2021, he was nominated for a Blues Music Award in the 'Contemporary Blues Male Artist' category. A 2009 winner of the International Blues Challenge, Soars has released six albums, including 2019's collection, Let Go of the Reins. His backing band are known as the Red Hots.

One music journalist noted about Soars that "He's a very versatile guitarist who is well-versed in several different genres."

== Life and career ==
Soars has lived in Boca Raton, Florida since 1999, but was born in Anaheim, California, and moved to Cedarville, Arkansas, with his family at three years old. His father, John Martin Soars, who played acoustic guitar and harmonica, enjoyed the music of Bob Dylan, Neil Young, and the Ozark Mountain Daredevils. Both his parents heard the latter's track, "If You Wanna Get to Heaven", and the young Soars recalled it being played regularly as he grew up. His father started teaching Soars to play chords on the guitar, when his son reached the age of 11. The youngster's tastes changed when a childhood friend introduced Soars to his cassette tape of Master of Puppets by Metallica, and they, along with Ozzy Osbourne, provided the soundtrack to Soars early teenage years. By the age of 16, Soars and his family relocated to West Palm Beach, Florida. The change in surroundings was profound, for as Soars entered 11th grade at Forest Hill Community High School, that student population alone was twice as large as that of Cedarville.

In 1988, Soars got lucky and smitten in equal measure. In a raffle, he won both a Gibson SG electric guitar and two tickets to see B.B. King in concert. After enjoying with his father front row centre seats at the concert, Soars got to meet King backstage and had him sign the guitar. Soars recalled the meeting "He was very humble and he knew how to say things and handle himself so I felt comfortable and at ease around him. He just he had this way about him. Just so humble. I remember him looking at the guitar and saying, 'This is an awfully pretty guitar. You sure you want me to sign it?'"

Soars developed his guitar technique, but did not play professionally until after his graduation. His enjoyment of heavy metal music won the initial battle and Soars played in a number of local bands including Burner, Mask of Innocence, Wynjara and Human Plague – before he had an eight-year membership with the thrash metal band, Raped Ape. Through touring with the latter, Soars became friends with musicians who played with Malevolent Creation and, in 1996, Soars joined them and was part of the line-up that recorded In Cold Blood. The band was due to undertake a European tour the following year, but Soars left them at that point as he was reluctant to lose his daytime occupation with Motorola. Nevertheless, Soars formed another metal outfit, Divine Empire, who went on to release four albums between 1998 and 2005. He kept in touch with the blues by playing alongside local blues musicians in his free time. In 2005, he turned his back on the heavy metal scene, after realising he was almost double the age of his average audience member.

A French colleague changed Soars focus by both teaching Soars jazz guitar theory and pointing him towards the work of Django Reinhardt. Soars quickly became a fan of Reinhardt and joined others in forming a jazz combo. Soars played rhythm guitar and worked for five hours a day working out his rhythm methodology by sitting alongside a metronome. With help from another South Florida guitarist, they formed a jazz ensemble, complete with a violinist. They worked together for two years, before the pull of the blues started to take over Soars life. He started a three piece by recruiting Chris Peet (drums) and Gary Remington (bass). They played gigs on their own and also backed Terry Hanck. In 2007, when David Shelley decided to enter the International Blues Challenge, Soars played guitar in his backing band. The memories of visiting Memphis for the first time stayed with him, and Soars entered a four-piece band of his own in the competition the following year. By 2009, the outfit had slimmed down to a three-piece named J.P. Soars and the Red Hots, and this time Soars won the award. "That opened up a ton of doors," he said. "Now, instead of being a local Florida band, we were traveling the country – soon the world." Soars also won the Albert King Guitar Award at the same competition, the prize for which was a white Gibson Les Paul. Upon returning home, he compared this guitar with the one B.B. King had signed for him (which he had stored under his bed) and noted that almost exactly 20 years had passed.

The previous year Soars had released his debut album, Back of my Mind, with Soars backed by his Red Hots bassist, Don Gottlieb and drummer, Chris Peet. It contained four of Soars own compositions, along with eight others which were cover versions of earlier blues tracks. These included "29 Ways" (Willie Dixon), "Gypsy Woman" (McKinley Morganfield), "Cocaine" (Reverend Gary Davis) and "Gangster of Love" (Johnny "Guitar" Watson). It was followed by another two albums, More Bees With Honey (2011) and Full Moon Night in Memphis (2014). Since 2011, Soars has also made spasmodic festival appearances as a member of Southern Hospitality, a supergroup that included Victor Wainwright and Damon Fowler. They released an album, Easy Livin', which appeared in the Top Ten of the 2013 Billboard Blues Albums Chart.

In 2015, a live album became available on import. J.P. Soars: Live From The Netherlands was recorded in December 2012 in Wageningen, Netherlands, and saw Soars on guitar, two-string cigar box guitar and vocals, plus Don 'Cougar' Gottlieb on bass, and Chris Peet playing drums. After further touring commitments and music festival appearances, it was not until 2018 that Soars next album, Southbound I-95, was ready for release. It featured guest appearances from Jimmy Thackery and Albert Castiglia on guitars, Sax Gordon on horn and Jason Newsted on bass guitar, with Lee Oskar playing the harmonica.

In recent years, J.P. Soars and the Red Hots have performed at the Baltic Sea Festival (Germany), the Liberation Day Festival (Netherlands), and done other shows in France, Switzerland, Luxembourg, Austria, and Colombia as well as touring the United States and Canada. More recently they played the Peer Blues Festival in Belgium, and at the ninth Mississippi Delta Blues Festival in Caxias do Sul, Brazil.

In January 2019, Soars and Peet traveled to Houma, Louisiana, to enable recording to take place at Tab Benoit's studio. Benoit produced the album and played drums, so usual percussionist Peet was able to play his other musical passion, the bass. Soar supplied the bulk of the vocals and played electric and acoustic guitar, dobro, dulcimer, and his homemade two-string cigar box guitar. The album was named Let Go of the Reins as, for the first time, the whole album was developed independent of Soars total control, and issued on Whiskey Bayou Records in August 2019. It contained seven Soars-penned originals, and versions of J. B. Lenoir's "Been Down So Long," and a cover of the Ozark Mountain Daredevils' "If You Wanna Get To Heaven", the latter to his parents' delight. Let Go of the Reins peaked at number 7 in the Billboard Blues Albums Chart in September 2019. The same year, Soars was nominated for a Blues Music Award in the 'Blues Rock Artist' category.

In 2021, he was nominated for the 42nd Blues Music Award ceremony in the 'Contemporary Blues Male Artist' category.

== J.P. Soars and the Red Hots current band members ==
- J.P. Soars – Vocals, guitar
- Chris Peet – Drums
- Cleveland Frederick – Bass

== Discography ==
=== Albums ===
Year	Title	Record label(s)
2008	Back of My Mind	Self-released
2011	More Bees With Honey	Self-released
2014	Full Moon Night in Memphis	Self-released
2015	J.P. Soars: Live From The Netherlands	Self-released (import)
2018	Southbound I-95	Self-released
2019	Let Go of the Reins	Whiskey Bayou Records
2024	Brick By Brick	Little Village Foundation
