= Eternal (Malevolent Creation album) =

Studio album by Malevolent Creation
- Released: May 23, 1995
- Studios: Criteria Studios, Miami, Florida; Innerface Studio, Fort Lauderdale, Florida
- Genre: Death metal
- Length: 47:15
- Label: Pavement Music
- Producer: Malevolent Creation

Malevolent Creation chronology
Stillborn (1993)	Eternal (1995)	Joe Black (1996)

Eternal is the fourth studio album by Florida death metal band Malevolent Creation. It was released on May 23, 1995, via Pavement Music. It is the first album without Brett Hoffmann.

The track "They Breed" is infamous for featuring racial slurs in its lyrics.

== Track listing ==
No.	Title	Lyrics	Music	Length
1.	"No Salvation"	Jason Blachowicz	Phil Fasciana	5:12
2.	"Blood Brothers"	Fasciana	Fasciana, Jon Rubin	4:04
3.	"Infernal Desire"	Blachowicz	Fasciana, Rubin	3:31
4.	"Living In Fear"	Fasciana	Fasciana	3:08
5.	"Unearthly"	Blachowicz	Fasciana	3:30
6.	"Enslaved"	Blachowicz	Rubin, Fasciana	4:18
7.	"Alliance Or War"	Blachowicz	Rubin, Fasciana	3:52
8.	"They Breed"	Blachowicz, Fasciana	Fasciana	2:49
9.	"To Kill"	Blachowicz	Rubin, Fasciana	3:58
10.	"Hideous Reprisal"	Blachowicz	Fasciana	3:43
11.	"Eternal"	Blachowicz	Fasciana	4:35
12.	"Tasteful Agony"	Peter Lilienthal	Rubin, Fasciana	4:35
Total length:				47:15

== Personnel ==
- Jason Blachowicz - bass, vocals
- Jon Rubin - guitar
- Phil Fasciana - guitar
- Dave Culross - drums
