= In Cold Blood (Malevolent Creation album) =

Studio album by Malevolent Creation
- Released: June 24, 1997
- Studio: Morrisound Recording, Tampa, Florida
- Genre: Death metal
- Length: 42:03
- Label: Pavement Music
- Producer: Scott Burns

Malevolent Creation chronology
Joe Black (1996)	In Cold Blood (1997)	The Fine Art of Murder (1998)

In Cold Blood is the fifth studio album by Florida death metal band Malevolent Creation. It was produced by Scott Burns and released on June 24, 1997 via Pavement Music. Jason Hagan was supposed to play guitar on the album but never did due to him having a falling-out with Derek Roddy.

== Track listing ==
No.	Title	Lyrics	Music	Length
1.	"Nocturnal Overlord"	Jason Blachowicz	Phil Fasciana	2:26
2.	"Prophecy"	Blachowicz	Jason Hagan	2:19
3.	"Compulsive"	Blachowicz	Fasciana	3:10
4.	"Narcotic Genocide"	Blachowicz	Blachowicz	3:01
5.	"Violated"	Blachowicz	Hagan	2:15
6.	"Leech"	Blachowicz	Fasciana	2:57
7.	"In Cold Blood"	Blachowicz	Fasciana	5:34
8.	"Visions of Malice"	Blachowicz	Fasciana	3:42
9.	"VII"	Blachowicz	Blachowicz	2:44
10.	"Preyed Upon"	Blachowicz	Fasciana	5:01
11.	"Millions"	Blachowicz	Hagan	2:26
12.	"Condemned"	Blachowicz	Jon Rubin, Fasciana	4:00
13.	"Seizure"	Blachowicz	Fasciana	2:28
Total length:				42:03

== Personnel ==
- Jason Blachowicz - bass, vocals
- Phil Fasciana - guitar
- John Paul Soars - guitar
- Derek Roddy - drums
