= Manifestation (Malevolent Creation album) =

Compilation album by Malevolent Creation
- Released: 2000
- Genre: Death metal
- Length: 1:15:23
- Label: Pavement Music

Malevolent Creation chronology
The Fine Art of Murder (1998)	Manifestation (2000)	Envenomed (2000)

Professional ratings
Review scores
Source	Rating
Kerrang!	3/5 stars

Manifestation is a compilation album by death metal band Malevolent Creation, released in 2000. A single and a double disc version of the album were released. The second disc of the double album is an enhanced CD with live video footage of the band's 1999 tour. The band had nothing to do with the release of the album

== Track listing ==
=== CD 1 ===
No.	Title	Length
1.	"In Cold Blood"	5:33
2.	"Condemned"	4:01
3.	"Nocturnal Overload"	2:28
4.	"Fine Art of Murder"	5:52
5.	"Scorn"	3:11
6.	"Blood Brothers"	4:04
7.	"Impaled Existence"	3:23
8.	"Living in Fear"	3:09
9.	"Manic Demise"	3:03
10.	"To Die Is at Hand"	3:38
11.	"Infernal Desire"	3:30
12.	"Bone Exposed"	3:33
13.	"Alliance or War"	3:52
14.	"Mass Graves"	6:17
15.	"Joe Black"	3:34
16.	"Self Important Freak"	2:37

=== CD 2 ===
No.	Title	Length
1.	"Multiple Stab Wounds" (Live)	3:45
2.	"Eve of the Apocalypse" (Live)	3:14
3.	"Slaughter of Innocence" (Live)	3:52
4.	"Monster" (Live)	2:47
