= Warkult =

Studio album by Malevolent Creation
- Released: July 27, 2004
- Studio: Liquid Ghost, Boca Raton, Florida
- Genre: Death metal
- Length: 43:39
- Label: Nuclear Blast
- Producer: J.F. Dagenais, Malevolent Creation

Malevolent Creation chronology
The Will to Kill (2002)	Warkult (2004)	Conquering South America (2004)

Professional ratings
Review scores
Source	Rating
AllMusic	3.5/5 stars

Warkult is the ninth studio album by Florida death metal band Malevolent Creation.

== Track listing ==
No.	Title	Music	Length
1.	"Dead March"	Barrett, Sims, Symons	2:48
2.	"Preemptive Strike"	Barrett, Sims, Fasciana, Symons	4:07
3.	"Supremacy Through Annihilation"	Barrett, Symons	3:34
4.	"Murder Reigns"	Fasciana, Symons	2:53
5.	"Captured"	Fasciana, Symons	3:45
6.	"Merciless"	Barrett, Symons	2:34
7.	"Section 8"	Fasciana, Symons	5:21
8.	"On Grounds of Battle"	Fasciana, Symons	4:17
9.	"Tyranic Oppression"	Fasciana, Symons	4:24
10.	"Ravaged by Conflict"	Barrett, Symons	2:09
11.	"Shock and Awe"	Barrett, Fasciana, Symons	4:25
12.	"Jack the Ripper" (Bonus Track; originally recorded by Hobbs' Angel of Death)	Peter Hobbs	3:18
Total length:			43:49

== Personnel ==
- Kyle Symons - vocals
- Phil Fasciana - lead guitars
- Rob Barrett - lead guitars
- Gordon Simms - bass
- Dave Culross - drums

== Production ==
- Produced by Malevolent Creation & J.F. Dagenais
- Recorded & Engineered by Phil Plaskon
- Mixed By Jean-François Dagenais
