= Wes Benscoter =

American artist

Wes Benscoter is an American artist who is best known for his work album covers, especially heavy metal albums. He also has made covers for magazines and books, and shirt designs, and his art is featured in many galleries around the world. Most of his work prior to 2006 is done using airbrush. Benscoter lives in Harrisburg, Pennsylvania.

== List of works ==
- Autopsy – Macabre Eternal
- Black Sabbath – Black Sabbath: The Dio Years
- Bloodbath – Nightmares Made Flesh (US-release)
- Broken Hope – Loathing
- Cattle Decapitation – To Serve Man
- Cattle Decapitation – Humanure
- Cattle Decapitation – Karma.Bloody.Karma
- Cattle Decapitation – The Harvest Floor
- Cattle Decapitation – Monolith of Inhumanity
- Cattle Decapitation – The Anthropocene Extinction
- Cattle Decapitation – Death Atlas
- Cattle Decapitation – Terrasite
- Cephalic Carnage – Exploiting Dysfunction
- Crypta – Echoes of the Soul
- Deceased – The Blueprints for Madness
- Deceased – Fearless Undead Machines
- Defiled – Erupted Wrath
- Defiled – Ugliness Revealed
- Defiled – Divination
- Defiled – In Crisis
- Dio – Stand Up and Shout: The Dio Anthology
- Embalmer – There Was Blood Everywhere
- Exit-13 – ...Just a Few More Hits
- Exit-13 – Smoking Songs
- Hooded Menace – The Tritonus Bell
- Hypocrisy – Osculum Obscenum
- Hypocrisy – End of Disclosure
- Incantation – Mortal Throne of Nazarene
- Kreator – Phantom Antichrist
- King's Evil – Deletion of Humanoise
- Kittie – Safe
- Mortician – Hacked Up for Barbecue
- Mortician – Chainsaw Dismemberment
- Mortician – Darkest Day of Horror
- Mortician – Domain of Death
- Mortician – House by the Cemetery
- Mortician – Zombie Apocalypse
- Nile – Black Seeds of Vengeance
- Regurgitate – Carnivorous Erection
- Ritual Carnage – The Highest Law
- Ritual Carnage – Every Nerve Alive
- Sinister – Hate
- Sinister – Diabolical Summoning
- Slayer – Divine Intervention
- Slayer – Undisputed Attitude
- Slayer – Live Intrusion
- Solace – Further
- Torture Killer – Swarm!
- Torture Killer – Sewers
- Vader – De Profundis
- Vader – Solitude in Madness
- Vehemence – Helping the World to See
- Vehemence – God Was Created
