= Curtains (1983 film) =

1983 slasher film directed by Richard Ciupka and Peter R. Simpson

- Theatrical release poster
- Directed by: Richard Ciupka (Note: Ciupka, who only directed approximately 45 minutes of extant footage, is credited on the film as "Jonathan Stryker", the name of the character portrayed in it by John Vernon. Producer Peter R. Simpson served as an uncredited director on the project.); Peter R. Simpson
- Written by: Robert Guza Jr.
- Produced by: Peter R. Simpson
- Starring: John Vernon; Samantha Eggar; Linda Thorson; Anne Ditchburn; Lynne Griffin; Lesleh Donaldson; Deborah Burgess
- Cinematography: Robert Paynter
- Edited by: Michael MacLaverty; Henry Richardson (Note: Richardson, who also performed editing work on the film, is not credited.)
- Music by: Paul Zaza
- Production company: Simcom Limited
- Distributed by: Jensen Farley Pictures
- Release dates: February 25, 1983 (United States); September 14, 1984 (Ottawa)
- Running time: 89 minutes
- Country: Canada
- Language: English
- Budget: $3.7 million
- Box office: $1 million (North America)

Curtains is a 1983 Canadian slasher film directed by Richard Ciupka and Peter R. Simpson, from a screenplay by Robert Guza Jr., and starring John Vernon, Samantha Eggar, Linda Thorson, Lynne Griffin, and Lesleh Donaldson. Centered on the world of theater and filmmaking, its plot focuses on a group of ambitious female performers who are targeted by a masked killer while auditioning for a film role at a prestigious director's mansion.

The film was conceived by Guza and producer Simpson, produced under the latter's production company Simcom Limited, who had previously released the box-office hit Prom Night (1980). Curtains was intended by Simpson to be an adult-oriented slasher aimed at older audiences, contrasting with the standard genre films of the time which featured predominately teenaged characters. Principal photography began in Toronto in late 1980, with much of the shoot taking place at Magder Studios on interior sets designed by Roy Forge Smith.

Curtains had an extremely troubled production, fueled by disputes between Simpson and Ciupka over its tone: Inspired by giallo films, Ciupka envisioned it as an arthouse thriller, while Simpson sought a more straightforward slasher film form. The conflicts between the two resulted in Ciupka abandoning the project, after which Simpson took over directorial duties, overseeing multiple rewrites and reshoots. The film was completed approximately two years after production began, with Ciupka detaching his name from the project and being credited under a pseudonym.

Curtains opened theatrically in the United States in February 1983, and was given a limited release in Ottawa the following year, through Jensen Farley Pictures. It received largely negative reviews from critics, with many citing its screenplay and lack of narrative cohesion as faults. It earned $1 million at the North American box office. In the years after its release, Curtains became a staple of late night television, (Note: Curtains aired on late night television internationally throughout the 1980s and into the 1990s.) and developed a cult following in the 2000s, with fans petitioning for an official DVD release. Following its inclusion in several multi-film bargain DVD releases sourced from video masters, the film received a 2K restoration by Synapse Films, who released it on Blu-ray and DVD in 2014.

== Plot ==
Samantha Sherwood, a beautiful actress and muse for director Jonathan Stryker, feigns mental illness and has herself committed to an asylum to prepare for the titular role of a mentally unstable woman in a film called Audra. Once inside, she discovers that Stryker has coerced her into method-rehearsing the material and committing herself so he can audition a group of younger women for the role in her absence. Furious at being double-crossed, Samantha escapes the asylum to seek revenge.

One of the candidates, fledgling actress Amanda Teuther, has a nightmare in which, while driving to the audition, she spots a large doll in the middle of the road. When she leaves her car to move it, it grabs her hand as someone gets into her car and runs over her. After she wakes up from her nightmare, a killer in a hag mask stabs her to death and takes her doll.

The next day, the other five women auditioning for the part of Audra arrive at Stryker's rural New England mansion: stand-up comedian Patti O'Connor, veteran actress Brooke Parsons, ballet dancer Laurian Summers, musician Tara DeMillo, and professional ice skater Christie Burns. The women are met by the mansion's caretaker, Matthew. Samantha, the uninvited guest, appears at the house during dinner, creating tension among the group. The girls spend their first night getting to know each other as a snowstorm develops. Tara has sex with Matthew in a jacuzzi as Stryker assaults Christie. Then, an unseen figure enters the tool shed, grabs a sickle, and sharpens it.

The next morning, Christie goes to a nearby pond to ice skate. She notices a small hand protruding out of the snow and uncovers Amanda's doll. The masked killer with the sickle appears and attacks Christie. The killer manages to wound her, but Christie is able to momentarily incapacitate the killer, escaping into the woods. As she rests against a tree, the killer appears from behind and viciously decapitates her. Shortly after, Stryker humiliates Samantha during a group audition by forcing her to wear the hag mask and pretend to seduce him in front of the others.

Later that day, a drunk Matthew rides away on a snowmobile in search of Christie. Patti is given an impromptu audition with Stryker and nearly explodes with anger when he mocks her ability to act, not even giving her a chance to start. While Tara and Laurian are rehearsing, Brooke discovers Christie's severed head in a toilet bowl. She frantically informs Stryker of what she has seen, but when they go back to the bathroom, the toilet is empty. Exploiting Brooke's vulnerability, Stryker seduces the frightened actress. Meanwhile, Tara and Patti ponder Brooke's reason for claiming that Christie is dead, suspecting foul play. Later on, while Laurian is dancing in her room upstairs, the killer sneaks in and stabs her to death.

After having sex, Brooke and Stryker are both shot dead by a figure in a robe. They fall from the second floor, with Stryker's body crashing through a window downstairs. Tara subsequently discovers the bodies of Brooke and Stryker, as well as Matthew. She attempts to flee the property but discovers the cars inoperable and covered in snow. Panicked, she takes shelter in Stryker's expansive prop shed, where she discovers Laurian's body among the hanging mannequins and is pursued by the killer. The killer ambushes Tara three times and she is able to fight them off, before hiding in a ventilation duct. Thinking she has outsmarted the killer, Tara begins to climb out of the duct, only to be pulled back in and murdered with an axe, her screams echoing throughout the prop shed.

Shortly after, Samantha finds Patti in the kitchen, and the two drink champagne together while discussing Audra's insanity. Samantha tells Patti about Stryker's treachery for having abandoned her, then admits to having killed both Stryker and Brooke out of rage. Patti seems disappointed and angered by Samantha's confession, before revealing she herself has murdered the other women to eliminate her competition. The disturbed Patti corners Samantha in the kitchen and stabs her to death with a butcher knife.

Some time later, Patti, now incarcerated in a psychiatric hospital, performs a monologue from Audra for her fellow patients, who pay her no mind.

== Cast ==
- John Vernon as Jonathan Stryker
- Linda Thorson as Brooke Parsons
- Samantha Eggar as Samantha Sherwood
- Anne Ditchburn as Laurian Summers
- Lynne Griffin as Patti O'Connor
- Lesleh Donaldson as Christie Burns
- Sandee Currie as Tara DeMillo
- Deborah Burgess as Amanda Teuther
- Michael Wincott as Matthew
- Maury Chaykin as "Monty"
- Booth Savage as Peter, Amanda's Boyfriend

== Themes ==
Literary critic John Kenneth Muir notes that madness is a primary theme of Curtains, which is outlined in its opening scene, featuring the character of Samantha performing a monologue on the subject in a theatrical performance. The politics of filmmaking and casting are also cited as theme by Muir, who suggests that Samantha's method acting rehearsal of her role as the mentally-ill Audra distorts her mental state and, in turn, results in her developing homicidal rage. The film makes use of several theatrical props and sets, also echoing its "witty" preoccupation with film and theater, as well as recurring dialogue from its actress characters:

Dwelling in the world of Variety, publicity shows, auditions, acting exercises and the like, Curtains' form nicely echoes its content... [because] all the characters are drama queens—literally—the dramatis personae are more interesting. "An actress must always be in control," one of them says, and that means—to Curtains' benefit—any one of them could be a liar or a killer. Or any two of them, for that matter.

== Production ==
=== Development ===
Producer Peter Simpson had wanted to make another successful slasher film after the release of Simcom's Prom Night, which had been a major box-office success. While jogging with writer Robert Guza Jr. in Toronto's Queen's Park, the two began developing the idea of a whodunit-style slasher film about a group of actresses being killed while auditioning for a film at a New England mansion. Wanting to avoid the "failure of teenybopper horror films such as Terror Train", Simpson signed onto the Curtains project because the film was "aimed for an adult audience." Richard Ciupka, a cinematographer with no directing experience at the time, was enlisted to direct. At the time of his hiring, Ciupka had just completed filming of Louis Malle's Atlantic City (1980). Ciupka was particularly inspired by Italian giallo films, envisioning Curtains as "artistic and European."

=== Casting ===
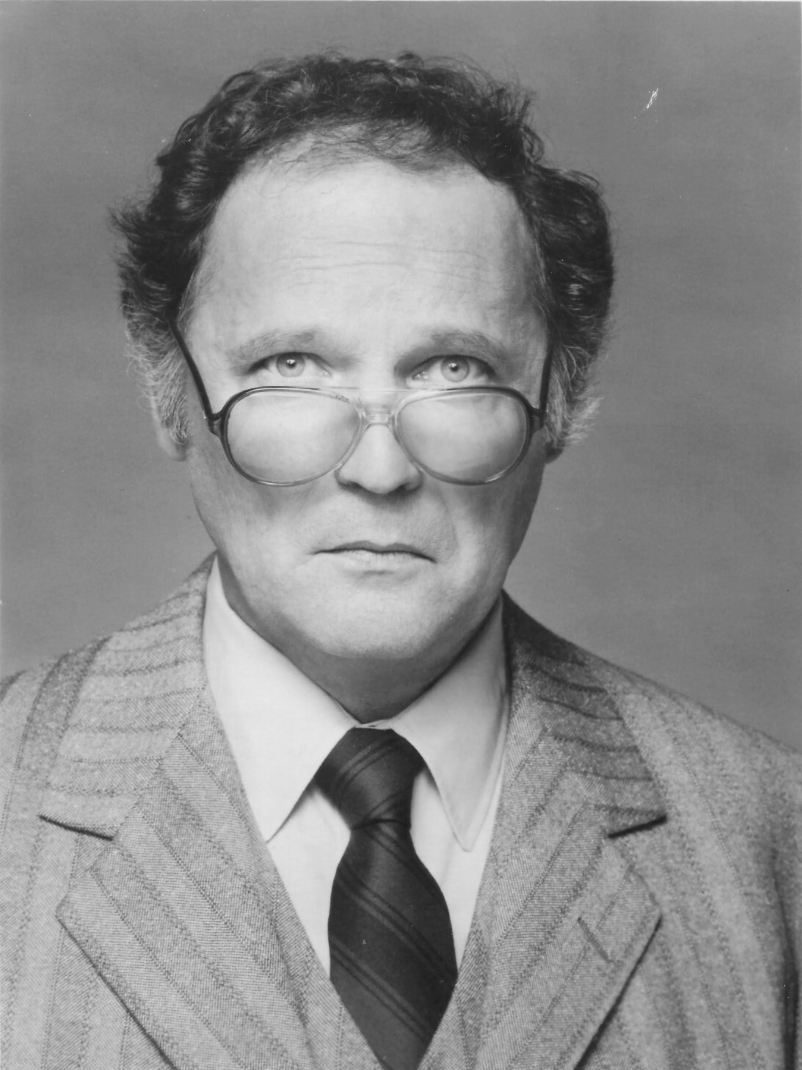
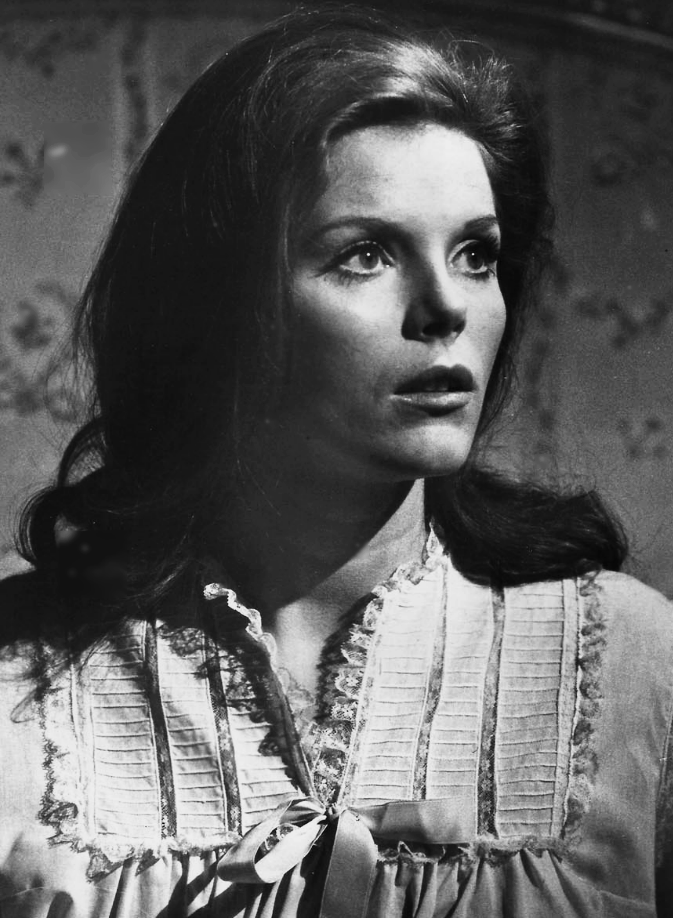
John Vernon and Samantha Eggar were cast in the principal roles

John Vernon was cast in the role of Jonathan Stryker, a part that had originally been considered for Klaus Kinski. British actress Samantha Eggar, who had appeared in several Canadian films, was cast as Samantha Sherwood; Eggar stated she thought the characters in the film were "vaguely drawn", the end result "awful", and she took the role chiefly for the work and salary. Director Ciupka recalled being "very intimidated" by Eggar: "She hardly spoke... she was a big-time actress... But there was never a problem and she was very good with everything.

Lynne Griffin, who had previously appeared in the slasher film Black Christmas (1974), was cast in the role of Patti, the stand-up comic, and at the time had been working in local theater productions in Toronto. Originally, Celine Lomez was cast in the role of Brooke Parsons, but she was replaced by Linda Thorson after producer Simpson fired her.

=== Filming ===
==== Initial shoot ====
It's been difficult making a film with so many principals. Because there are seven major characters, it's impossible to do psychological studies of all of them. But to have the suspense build, there has to be some psychological exploration.

— Ciupka commenting on the film's characters during production, April 1981

Principal photography for Curtains began November 17, 1980, on location in Muskoka, Ontario, and Toronto, Ontario, Canada, on a budget of $3.7 million. Approximately ten percent of the film's budget was allocated to create the elaborate, art nouveau-inspired interior sets for its mansion setting, which were designed by Roy Forge Smith. The majority of the film was shot on these sets, which were constructed at Toronto's Magder Studios. Taking advantage of a record snowstorm that had hit the northeastern United States in December 1980, exterior locations were sought in Vermont for shooting, but a sudden rainstorm that melted the snow thwarted the opportunity. Instead, the snowy exterior shoots took place in Port Carling. Filming was still underway in January 1981.

In preparation for the film's ice-skating sequence, actress Lesleh Donaldson was sent for skating practice by the film's producers. She had very little prior training in the field and even had fellow actress Anne Ditchburn help with her choreography. Nevertheless, when filming for that scene commenced, Donaldson tripped on the uneven ice and injured herself, resulting in a stand-in double being used for her long shots.

The hag mask worn by the killer in the film was designed by special effects artist Greg Cannom.

==== Completion under Peter Simpson ====
Curtains suffered a troubled production, ultimately leading to it being shelved for a year, during which rewrites, reshoots, and one major recasting was done. As a result, two sets of credits grace the ending of Curtains, divided between "Act I" and "Act II", denoting the two different, protracted production periods. Eventually, numerous crew members had to be rehired to shoot footage to complete the film.

The film's turbulent production stemmed from a clash between director Ciupka and producer Peter Simpson. Commenting during the shoot in April 1981, Ciupka expressed some anxiety about his direction of the project, particularly around effectively depicting its large cast of characters. Ciupka envisioned the film as more of an arthouse giallo-inspired thriller in the style of Ten Little Indians (1965), whereas Simpson wanted a more commercial slasher film. According to actress Linda Thorson, at one point, the tension between the two became so intense, it caused many of the actors to feel uncertain whether the production would even move forward at all.

Ciupka ultimately left the production after disagreements with producer Simpson over stylistics and tone. At the time Ciupka abandoned the project, only 45 minutes of viable footage had been shot, which resulted in Simpson having to take over the shoot approximately one year later. The final chase scene in the prop house was filmed by Simpson over a year after the initial production began, as was the ending murder scene between Samantha Eggar and Lynne Griffin. Writer Robert Guza Jr. returned to the project for rewrites under Simpson's supervision. This resulted in various additional scenes being shot, many of which never made it into the final picture.

Deleted scenes included a backstory sequence where, prior to arriving at Stryker's retreat, Christie is emotionally rejected by her skating coach. This scene was intended to show the character's vulnerability when she is rejected again, this time by Stryker. The scene was shot two years after the initial production on a college campus, but never made it into the final cut.

Actors Michael Wincott and Anne Ditchburn also originally had more dialogue, but most of their lines were cut from the final version of the film. Wincott's death was originally filmed with him being killed on a snowmobile and then crashing into the library, scaring Sandee Currie's character. This scene was cut out of the film, and he is, instead, killed off-screen in a hot tub.

An alternate ending of the film was shot in Toronto. In this scene, Lynne Griffin's character Patti O'Connor delivers a monologue on a theater stage surrounded by her dead victims. This alternate ending was not used in the final cut of the film. According to Michael MacLaverty, film editor for Curtains, the alternate theater ending was ultimately discarded because Alana Simpson, then wife of producer Peter Simpson, felt it was "too improbable." "[Alana] couldn't really accept the fact that all these corpses were somehow dragged together [by the killer] and put on a stage somewhere," recalls MacLaverty. The film was eventually completed in September 1982, approximately two years after principal photography had commenced.

After the film was completed in 1982, director Ciupka detached his name from the final cut, and the film's director is credited as "Jonathan Stryker", the name of John Vernon's character. According to film historian Scott Drebit, the finished film's middle 45 minutes were directed by Ciupka, while its first 20 minutes and final 20 minutes were directed by Simpson.

== Music ==
The original score for Curtains was composed by Paul Zaza, who had previously composed the score for Simcom's slasher film Prom Night (1980) as well as My Bloody Valentine (1981).

In August 2022, Waxwork Records released Zaza's original film score via digital download and streaming. Waxwork subsequently released a vinyl LP edition in October 2022.

== Release ==
Curtains opened regionally in the United States, premiering in Phoenix and San Antonio on February 25, 1983. The film expanded its release on March 11, 1983 to numerous other cities, including Spokane, Washington, Kansas City, Missouri, Boise, Idaho, Omaha, Nebraska, Los Angeles, and San Francisco. The film opened in New York City on April 8, 1983.

In the United Kingdom, the film opened in Greater Manchester and Liverpool on June 23, 1983. It was released in its native Canada the following year, premiering in Ottawa on September 14, 1984. The film was released in Italy as The Mask of Terror and as Death Count to Seven in Norway.

=== Home media ===
Curtains was first released on VHS by Vestron Video in 1984.

Throughout the early 2000s, a DVD release for the film never manifested, leading fans to start an online petition for a DVD release.

The film eventually was released on DVD on October 5, 2010, by Echo Bridge Home Entertainment as part of the Midnight Horror Collection: Bloody Slashers DVD collection, which also includes Secrets of the Clown, Hoboken Hollow, and Room 33, three direct-to-video B-movies from the 2000s. This release featured generic cover art and a poor transfer from VHS source material.

On July 29, 2014, Curtains was released on Blu-ray and DVD by Synapse Films, featuring a new 2K transfer from the original prints, as well as a 5.1 surround sound audio remastering. It features a retrospective "making of" documentary and vintage documentary footage, an audio commentary, and the film's original theatrical trailer.

== Reception ==
=== Box office ===
Curtains earned approximately $1 million at the North American box office.

=== Critical response ===
==== Contemporary ====
Reviewing the film for Cinema Canada, Andrew Dowler observed, "the whole thing is so badly written that it's astounding the performers managed to make anything at all of their roles," but conceded that Eggar, Griffin, and Thorson gave adequate performances. Film critic Leonard Maltin gave the film an unflattering review, calling it a "badly conceived and executed horror opus." Joe Baltake of the Philadelphia Daily News noted that Vernon "projects a genuine aura of menace" and that Eggar is "saddled here with a character that looks like a practical joke by her agent," summing up the film: "The movie itself is never a mystery, never frightening, but is, instead, unrelievedly solemn, given to long, mournful pauses." Rick Brough of the Park City Newspaper ranked the film two stars out of five, adding: "Don't bother using logic to figure out whodunit. The movie cheats shamelessly. Outwitting the dumb script in Curtains may be the only challenge in this waste." The Buffalo News's Dale Anderson also noted the film's plot inconsistencies, adding: "Given the isolation, the snowstorm outside and the marvelous art deco appointments in the place, a sudden shift to the plot framework of The Shining might be in order, but the dramatic deftness of this crew is so slight that the act of getting half a dozen people into the same place at the same time is about all they can handle." The Omaha World-Herald's Roger Catlin criticized the unbelievability of its twist ending, and noted that several moviegoers at his screening walked out.

Linda Gross of the Los Angeles Times summarized the film as a "mediocre and grotesque Grand Guignol horror movie," criticizing its depiction of violence against women. Stephen Hunter, writing for The Baltimore Sun, noted that "the most affecting thing about Curtains is its melancholy subtext of failed career and unrealized aspirations," but concluded: "Only the presence of several slick professional actors—Samantha Eggar and John Vernon—and some glossy production values separate this pointless, thoroughly meretricious film from the cruder, rawer teenage hacker melodramas that it so resembles." Meta Gaertnier of The Wichita Eagle echoed this sentiment, writing that the performances of Eggar and Vernon are "what rescues the film from utter inanity," and recommended it only to ardent fans of slasher films.

Richard Martin of the Ottawa Citizen criticized the film for its unbelievable characters and lack of coherence, but conceded that, despite this, audiences "go expecting to be scared, to feel those delicious shivers run up and down your spine, to gasp and cry out in shock and then laugh with relief. And Curtains delivers enough of the time to make it worthwhile." The Fort Worth Star-Telegram's John Dycus similarly felt the film featured a cliched screenplay but was no less frightening, writing: "You'll duck beneath your sweater sleeve at Curtains. The slayings are unsettling, but there's something worse: the plot."

Among the publications who gave the film favorable reviews were The Hollywood Reporter, who described it as "the classiest, most chilling thriller to come along in quite a while… rich in surprises of a gripping, sensuous nature." Candice Russell of the Sun Sentinel also praised the film as a "scary and suspenseful," likening its plot that of Agatha Christie's Ten Little Indians. Susan Marschalk of the Hickory Daily Record also praised the film's suspense, adding that it "relies less on blood and gore for its success than it does on timing and an unexpected twist here and there, which makes it a little better than most films of its category."

==== Modern appraisal ====
Curtains has gained a cult following in the years since its release, and garnered a series of positive reviews when it was released for the first time on Blu-ray in July 2014. Brian Orndorf of Blu-ray.com noted the film's haphazard construction, but praised its visuals, writing:

Curtains isn't a single film, it's a handful of subplots and ideas competing for screentime under the guise of a traditional '80s-style slasher endeavor. Bizarre seems too mild a description when discussing this movie, which is actually stitched together from two production periods spread out over three years, with the original director, Richard Ciupka, taking his name off the effort when producer Peter R. Simpson elected to jazz up the rough cut with customary slicing and dicing. The fascinating backstory on Curtains is evident throughout the presentation, leaving the picture half-realized, shooing away substance to plow ahead with violence. It's a mess, but an entertaining one thanks to Ciupka's visual ambition and ensemble work from the oddball cast, who deliver the proper level of hysteria to assist what little suspense remains.

Writing for Birth.Movies.Death. in 2017, Brian Collins commented on the film's surreal quality, writing that its "wooziness is precisely why the film has endured to the degree that it has, instead of being forgotten about and relegated to budget packs for eternity... The reason I think that ice skating scene—which really isn't all that special as far as these things go—left such a scar on many a young horror fan who caught it on late night TV is because the film is so "off" and even hard to explain in full, much like an actual nightmare." Critic John Kenneth Muir similarly notes that the film contains a number of surreal sequences. Writing in Legacy of Blood: A Comprehensive Guide to Slasher Movies (2004), Jim Harper summarizes: "There are some real touches of class and originality in Curtains, but the poor editing style and erratic feel stops the film from being a slasher classic. Even so, it's a thoughtful and interesting movie." Budd Wilkins of Slant Magazine praised the film's "playful oscillations between playacting and reality" which "toys with the conventions of the slasher genre to amusing effect."

Dustin Putman of The Film File gave the film three out of four stars, writing: "the picture doesn't always play by conventional slasher rules and its more surrealistic aspects render it all the more fascinatingly esoteric." Paul Chambers of the film website Movie Chambers gave the film a mixed review, praising Eggar and Vernon's performances as well as the oft-remembered ice-skating sequence, while also noting the film as "[so] directionless and improbable, that no payoff is worth it." Film historian Jim Harper also gave the film a mildly positive review, summarizing: "There are some real touches of class and originality in Curtains, but the poor editing and erratic feel stops the film from being a slasher classic. Even so, it's a thoughtful and interesting movie." John Kenneth Muir also praised the film, writing that "the murder scenes are staged with ingenuity," and noting that the film's "form nicely echoes its content."

On the review aggregator website Rotten Tomatoes, 60% of 10 critics' reviews are positive.

== In popular culture ==
American death metal band Mortician used a sample from Curtains as an introduction for the song "Audra" from their 2003 album Darkest Day of Horror. Bassist / vocalist Will Rahmer has said in interviews that Curtains is one of his favorite films. Clips from the film were used in the music video for Oneohtrix Point Never's "Lost But Never Alone."

== Sources ==
- Armstrong, Keith Byron (2003). Slasher Films: An International Filmography, 1960 Through 2001. Jefferson, North Carolina: McFarland & Company. ISBN 978-0-786-41462-8.
- Burrell, James (July 2014). "Someone is Watching". Rue Morgue. No. 146. ISSN 1481-1103.
- Drebit, Scott (2024). A Cut Below: A Celebration of B Horror Movies, 1950s-1980s. Jefferson, North Carolina: McFarland & Company. ISBN 978-1-476-69195-4.
- Donahue, Suzanne Mary (1987). American Film Distribution: The Changing Marketplace. Ann Arbor, Michigan: UMI Research Press. ISBN 978-0-835-71776-2.
- Harper, Jim (2004). Legacy of Blood: A Comprehensive Guide to Slasher Movies. Manchester, England: Critical Vision. ISBN 978-1-900-48639-2.
- Koven, Mikel J. (2023). "The Canadian Giallo, or How the Italian Thriller Influenced the Canadian Slasher Film". In Edwards, Matthew; Berns, Fernando Gabriel Pagnoni (eds.). Bloodstained Narratives: The Giallo Film in Italy and Abroad. Jackson, Mississippi: Univ. Press of Mississippi. pp. 251–272. ISBN 978-1-496-84446-0.
- Maltin, Leonard (1995). Leonard Maltin's Movie and Video Guide. New York City, New York: Signet. ISBN 978-0-451-18505-1.
- Muir, John Kenneth (2012). Horror Films of the 1980s. Vol. 1. Jefferson, North Carolina: McFarland & Company. ISBN 978-0-786-47298-7. OCLC 840902442.
- Nowell, Richard (2010). Blood Money: A History of the First Teen Slasher Film Cycle. New York City, New York: Bloomsbury. ISBN 978-1-441-12496-8.
- Rockoff, Adam (2016). Going to Pieces: The Rise and Fall of the Slasher Film, 1978–1986. Jefferson, North Carolina: McFarland & Company. ISBN 978-0-786-49192-6.
- Sipos, Thomas S. (2010). Horror Film Aesthetics: Creating the Visual Language of Fear. Jefferson, North Carolina: McFarland & Company. ISBN 978-0-786-44972-9.
