= Horror of the Zombies =

Studio album by Impetigo
- Released: 1992
- Genre: Death metal; grindcore; deathgrind
- Length: 46:07
- Label: Wild Rags

Impetigo chronology
Faceless (EP) (1991)	Horror of the Zombies (1992)

Impetigo studio album chronology chronology
Ultimo Mondo Cannibale (1990)	Horrors of the Zombies (1992)

Horror of the Zombies is the second and final studio album by American deathgrind band Impetigo. It was the last album the band has released since their 2007 live album, which was recorded at their reunion show in Chicago.

Metal Injection described the album as "a classic piece of death metal/grindcore."

== Track listing ==
All lyrics are written by Impetigo; all music is composed by Impetigo.

Horror of the Zombies
No.	Title	Intro	Length
1.	"Boneyard"	Serial killer Henry Lee Lucas talking about his acts
2.	"I Work For The Streetcleaner"	Deadbeat at Dawn, 1988
3.	"Wizard of Gore"	Herschell Gordon Lewis's The Wizard of Gore, 1970
4.	"Mortuaria"	Andy Warhol's Flesh for Frankenstein, 1973
5.	"Cannibale Ballet"
6.	"Trap Them And Kill Them"
7.	"Cannibal Lust"	Cannibal Holocaust, 1980
8.	"Defiling The Grave"	Interview with murderer Daniel Rakowitz done by Geraldo Rivera
9.	"Staph Terrorist"	Japanese gore movie Guinea Pig 2: Flowers of Flesh and Blood, 1985
10.	"Breakfast At The Manchester Morgue" (Outro at the end is some kid who called into some Christian talk show hosted by Bob Larson.)	Let Sleeping Corpses Lie, 1974

Notes

The album was re-released on CD by Razorback Records and includes original cover and alternate cover.
