= To Serve Man =

To Serve Man may refer to:

- To Serve Man (short story), a 1950 science fiction short story by Damon Knight
- "To Serve Man" (The Twilight Zone), 1962 television episode based on Knight's story
- To Serve Man (album), 2002 album by American death metal band Cattle Decapitation

== See also ==
- Son of man came to serve, an episode in the New Testament shortly after Jesus predicts his death
