= Nuclear Death =

American death metal band

- Origin: Phoenix, Arizona, U.S.
- Genres: Death metal, grindcore
- Years active: 1986–2000
- Labels: Wild Rags, Cat's Meow, Dark Symphonies, The Crypt, Extermist, Floga
- Past members: Lori Bravo; Steve Cowan; Phil Hampson; Joel Whitfield

Nuclear Death was an American death metal band formed in 1986 in Phoenix, Arizona. They were an early example of an extreme metal band with a female vocalist, Lori Bravo.

Their style, which drummer Joel Whitfield described as "deathrashardcorextreme music", was compared to bands like Repulsion and Scum-era Napalm Death.

== History ==
Lori Bravo (bass guitar), Phil Hampson (guitar), and Joel Whitfield (drums) formed Nuclear Death on March 23, 1986, while they were in high school. Nuclear Death cited Venom, Motörhead, The Plasmatics, Witchfinder General, and Discharge as their influences. Their first demo, Wake Me When I'm Dead, was released later that same year, receiving positive reviews from American and overseas zines. At the time, few death metal artists had female singers. Their second demo, Welcome to the Minds of the Morbid, followed in 1987, on the back of which Nuclear Death signed a contract with Richard Campos from Wild Rags, a record label, fanzine and record dealer in California.

In 1991, the band released the controversial album Carrion for Worm, containing songs considered distasteful, such as "The Human Seed", "Lurker in the Closet: A 'Fairy' Tale", and "Greenflies". Carrion for Worm featured vocals by Chris Reifert, from death metal band Autopsy, on two songs, "Cathedral of Sleep" and "Vampirism".

On May 23, 1992, Nuclear Death played a show in Puerto Rico with label partners Impetigo. Later that year, they released For Our Dead, a four-track single containing a rerecorded version of 1987's "The Third Antichrist" from Welcome to the Minds of the Morbid.

After the break-up of Nuclear Death, Bravo formed the band Raped in 2002. Whitfield joined Eroticide in 1991. After leaving the band in 1992, Hampson was in Eroticide (1996 to 1998), and Whorror (2000 to 2002). In late 2013, Hampson started Feral Viscera. He continues to record as Feral Viscera, but as of January 2016, reformed Whorror along with original vocalist Donn Sullivan and original drummer Mike Wyatt (Genocaust).

== Recognition ==
Nuclear Death's 1990 debut album Bride of Insect was listed in Decibel magazine's "Hall of Fame" as entry No. 90. The entry says:

The music is so dark, twisted and obscure that one could hazard comparisons to multiple strains of ensuing extremity ... The lyrics match–if not surpass–the music's filthy intensity. In a time when extreme bands were ranting about the government or bumping fists with Satan, Nuclear Death chose to delve into the depths of human depravity. Murder and sexual deviancy were the order of the day, as incest, bestiality and necrophilia were all celebrated in loving detail.

== Members ==
Last known lineup

- Lori Bravo – vocals, bass, guitar (1986–2000)

Past members

- Joel Whitefield – drums (1986–1990)
- Phil Hampson – guitar (1986–1992)
- Steve Cowen – drums, keyboards (1990–1996)

== Discography ==
- 1986 – Wake Me When I'm Dead (demo)
- 1987 – Welcome to the Minds of the Morbid (demo)
- 1987 – A Symphony of Agony (demo)
- 1988 – Vultures Feeding (EP)
- 1988 – Caveat (demo) cassette tape
- 1990 – Bride of Insect LP (Wild Rags)
- 1991 – Carrion for Worm LP (Wild Rags)
- 1992 – For Our Dead EP/cassette tape (Wild Rags)
- 1992 – All Creatures Great and Eaten cassette tape
- 1996 – The Planet Cachexial CD (Cat's Meow Records)
- 2000 – Harmony Drinks of Me CD (Cat's Meow Records)

=== DVDs ===
- ???? – Unalive in Texas VHS
- ???? – The Profligacy Video VHS
