= The Embalmer =

The Embalmer may refer to:

- The Embalmer (manga), a manga series written and illustrated by Mitsukazu Mihara
- The Embalmer (1965 film) or Il mostro di Venezia, a giallo film directed by Dino Tavella
- The Embalmer (1996 film), a film directed by S. Torriano Berry
- The Embalmer (2002 film) or L'imbalsamatore, a film directed by Matteo Garrone

== See also ==
- Embalming
- Embalmer (band)
