= Ultimo Mondo Cannibale (album) =

Studio album by Impetigo
- Released: November 1990
- Recorded: January 13, 14 and 16 (1990)
- Studio: Creative Space Studios
- Genre: Deathgrind, goregrind
- Length: 52:56
- Label: Wild Rags
- Producer: Stevo, Dave Joost

Impetigo chronology
Giallo (demo) (1989)	Ultimo Mondo Cannibale (1990)	Antefatto (1991)

Impetigo studio album chronology chronology
Ultimo Mondo Cannibale (1990)	Horror of the Zombies (1992)

Ultimo Mondo Cannibale is the debut album by American deathgrind band Impetigo. It was released in 1990 and was a major influence in the grindcore and goregrind scene. It is one of the first albums to use sound segments from horror films as intros for their songs (Italian cannibal movie by Ruggero Deodato of the same name). Another of the first bands to use this technique is Spanish grindcore band Machetazo. The album's lyrical themes mainly pertain to gore, with many detailed descriptions of violence.

The cover had to be changed because it was too graphic and violent. The original cover, and most of the Impetigo artwork, was drawn by band frontman Stevo Dobbins.

== Reception and Legacy ==
Professional ratings
Review scores
Source	Rating
AllMusic	4.5/5 stars

Writing for AllMusic, John Book wrote, "This Illinois quartet mixes death metal, grindcore, and superfast playing and ended up with one of the sickest albums in heavy metal history. Intense, shocking and many times gross, sick, and too brutal for words, it is highly unusual and eclectic, but definitely not for everyone."

== Track listing ==
No.	Title	Length
1.	"Maggots (intro from Lucio Fulci's City of the Living Dead, 1980)"	3:48
2.	"Dis-Organ-Ized"	1:51
3.	"Intense Mortification"	2:48
4.	"Revenge of the Scabby Man (intro from Ilsa, She Wolf of the SS, 1975)"	2:44
5.	"Venereal Warts 3"	0:12
6.	"Bloody Pit of Horror (intro from Ilsa, She Wolf of the SS, 1975)"	4:16
7.	"Dear Uncle Creepy"	1:32
8.	"Bitch Death Teenage Mucous Monster from Hell" (intro created by producer, Stevo)"	4:21
9.	"Zombie (intro from Lucio Fulci's Zombi 2, 1979)"	1:14
10.	"Jane Fonda Sucks Part 2"	0:45
11.	"Red Wigglers"	3:51
12.	"Harbinger of Death"	1:58
13.	"Unadulterated Brutality (intro from Herschell Gordon Lewis's The Wizard of Gore, 1970)"	4:13
14.	"Mortado (outro from a prank phone call done by the members of Texas grind band Splatterreah)"	2:44
15.	"Heart of Illinois"	4:49
16.	"My Lai"	1:31
17.	"Bad Dreams (intro from Ruggero Deodato's Cannibal Holocaust, 1980)"	0:58
18.	"Who's Fucking Who?"	1:13
Total length:		52:56

== Notes ==
"Heart of Illinois" and "My Lai" are LP bonus tracks, "Bad Dreams" and "Who's Fucking Who?" cassette tape bonus tracks.
