= Hacked Up for Barbecue =

1996 album by Mortician

Studio album by Mortician
- Released: January 28, 1997
- Recorded: July 1996
- Genres: Brutal death metal; deathgrind
- Length: 50:29
- Label: Relapse
- Producers: Desmond Tolhurst; Mortician; William J. Yurkiewicz (exec.); Matthew F. Jacobson (exec.)

Mortician chronology
House by the Cemetery EP (1995)	Hacked Up for Barbecue (1997)	Zombie Apocalypse (1998)

Professional ratings
Review scores
Source	Rating
AllMusic	3/5 stars
The San Diego Union-Tribune	2.5/4 stars

Hacked Up for Barbecue is the debut studio album by American death metal band Mortician, released on January 28, 1997 by Relapse Records. The album was later reissued as a two-on-one package with the band's 1998 EP Zombie Apocalypse.

== Critical reception ==
Tom Schulte of Allmusic gave Hacked Up for Barbeque three out of five stars, saying that it "should herald a long career of brutal noise, paying homage to sick flicks. One can wager that the gorecore here is better than any of the Z-movies quoted." The San Diego Union-Tribune called the album "wicked and menacing," writing that Mortician "somehow discovers drama between blasts of heavy guitar and drums."

== Track listing ==
No.	Title	Length
1.	"Bloodcraving" (When a Stranger Calls)	5:13
2.	"Embalmed Alive"	0:50
3.	"Cremated"	1:34
4.	"Three on a Meathook" (Three on a Meathook)	3:06
5.	"Brutally Mutilated"	0:39
6.	"Deranged Insanity" (Unhinged)	2:28
7.	"Cannibal Feast" (Cannibal Ferox)	1:40
8.	"Blown to Pieces"	0:58
9.	"Fog of Death" (The Fog)	3:31
10.	"Brutal Disfigurement"	1:26
11.	"Apocalyptic Devastation" (The Road Warrior)	3:13
12.	"Inquisition"	1:21
13.	"Hacked Up for Barbecue" (The Texas Chain Saw Massacre)	4:18
14.	"Abolition"	0:51
15.	"Necrocannibal"	3:59
16.	"Ripped in Half"	0:25
17.	"Morbid Butchery" (Maniac)	2:01
18.	"Decapitated"	1:02
19.	"Drilling for Brains"	0:49
20.	"Eaten Alive by Maggots" (Mortuary)	1:53
21.	"Witches' Coven" (Suspiria)	3:19
22.	"Worms"	0:53
23.	"Annihilation"	1:03
24.	"Mortician" (Phantasm, Phantasm III: Lord of the Dead)	3:21
Total length:		50:29

== Personnel ==
Mortician

- Will Rahmer — bass, vocals
- Roger Beaujard — guitar, drum programming

Production

- Desmond Tolhurst and Mortician — producers
- Matthew F. Jacobson and William J. Yurkiewicz Jr. — executive producers
- Desmond Tolhurst — engineer
- Roger J. Beaujard — assistant engineer
- Dave Shirk and Bill Yurkiewicz — mastering
- Wes Benscoter — cover art
