= The Harvest Floor =

Studio album by Cattle Decapitation
- Released: January 20, 2009
- Recorded: Sharkbite Studios in Oakland, California
- Genres: Technical death metal, deathgrind
- Length: 37:37
- Label: Metal Blade
- Producer: Billy Anderson

Cattle Decapitation chronology
Karma.Bloody.Karma (2006)	The Harvest Floor (2009)	Monolith of Inhumanity (2012)

The Harvest Floor is the fourth studio album by American deathgrind band Cattle Decapitation. It was released through Metal Blade Records on January 20, 2009. The album was recorded and mixed at Sharkbite studios in Oakland, California, with engineering and production handled by Billy Anderson. The artwork was designed by Wes Benscoter, and shows the outside of a large slaughterhouse with the "general public being herded inside to meet their demise." It is the band's last album to feature bassist Troy Oftedal, and their first to feature drummer Dave McGraw. The album was inducted into Decibel's hall of fame.

A music video was released for the song "Regret and the Grave".

== Sales ==
Professional ratings
Review scores
Source	Rating
AllMusic	3.5/5 stars
Blabbermouth.net	9/10
CHARTattack	4/5 stars
Exclaim!	favorable
Metal Injection	favorable
Metal Storm	9/10

The Harvest Floor sold 1,700 copies in the United States in its first week of release, according to Nielsen SoundScan. The album debuted at number 16 on the Billboard Top Heatseekers chart.

== Track listing ==
No.	Title	Length
1.	"The Gardeners of Eden"	5:39
2.	"A Body Farm"	3:29
3.	"We Are Horrible People"	3:56
4.	"Tooth Enamel and Concrete"	2:57
5.	"The Ripe Beneath the Rind"	2:50
6.	"The Product Alive"	3:05
7.	"In Axestasy"	4:43
8.	"Into the Public Bath"	3:11
9.	"The Harvest Floor" (instrumental)	3:07
10.	"Regret & the Grave"	4:40
Total length:		37:37

Japanese edition bonus track
No.	Title	Length
11.	"You People"	2:33
Total length:		40:10

== Personnel ==
=== Cattle Decapitation ===
- Travis Ryan – vocals
- Josh Elmore – guitars
- Troy Oftedal – bass
- David McGraw – drums

=== Guest musicians ===
- Ross Sewage – vocals on "Tooth Enamel and Concrete"
- Dino Sommese – vocals on "The Product Alive"

=== Additional musicians ===
- Jackie Perez Gratz – electric cello
- John Wiese – electronics, atmospherics
- Jarboe – vocal melodies
- Billy Anderson – keyboards

=== Production ===
- Billy Anderson – engineering, production
- Adam Myatt – additional engineering
- Zack Ohren – engineering (drums), recording (drums)
- Alan Douches – mastering

=== Artwork and design ===
- Wes Benscoter – album artwork, photo editing
- Cain Gillis – album layout
- Sarah Remetch – photography
- Robin Laananen – photography
- Travis Ryan – art direction, concept

=== Studio ===
- Sharkbite Studios, Oakland, CA, USA – engineered, recorded
