= Brutally Mutilated =

EP by Mortician
- Released: December 1990
- Genre: Death metal
- Length: 7:59
- Label: Seraphic Decay

Mortician chronology
Demo #1 1990 (1990)	Brutally Mutilated (1990)	Mortal Massacre 7-inch EP (1991)

Brutally Mutilated is a 7-inch vinyl EP by the death metal band Mortician. It was recorded prior to the band's involvement with Relapse Records Only 1000 copies of the EP were pressed.

The tracks from Brutally Mutilated, along with the tracks from Mortician's Mortal Massacre 7-inch EP were later re-issued by Relapse Records on the Mortal Massacre cd.

== Track listing ==
No.	Title	Length
1.	"Mortician"	3:21
2.	"Brutally Mutilated"	0:39
3.	"Necrocannibal"	3:59
Total length:		7:59

== Personnel ==
- Will Rahmer — Bass and Vocals
- John McEntee — Guitar
- Matt Sicher — Drums
