= Ultimo Mondo Cannibale (disambiguation) =

Ultimo Mondo Cannibale (Last Cannibal World) may refer to:

- Ultimo mondo cannibale, a 1977 cannibal film directed by Ruggero Deodato
- Ultimo Mondo Cannibale (album), an album by the grindcore band Impetigo

== See also ==
- Mondo Cannibale, a 1980 cannibal film directed by Jesús Franco
