= The Anthropocene Extinction =

Studio album by Cattle Decapitation
- Released: August 7, 2015
- Recorded: January–February 2015
- Studio: Flatline Audio, Westminster, CO
- Genre: Technical death metal, deathgrind
- Length: 46:14
- Label: Metal Blade
- Producer: Dave Otero

Cattle Decapitation chronology
Monolith of Inhumanity (2012)	The Anthropocene Extinction (2015)	Death Atlas (2019)

Singles from The Anthropocene Extinction
- 1. "Cannibalistic Invasivorism" Released: June 19, 2015

The Anthropocene Extinction is the sixth studio album by American death metal band Cattle Decapitation. It was released on August 7, 2015, on Metal Blade Records. It became Cattle Decapitation's first album to chart on the Billboard 200, debuting at No. 100 (No. 44 on "Top Albums").

== Lyrical concept ==
The previous record, Monolith of Inhumanity, dealt with the future of Earth, if mankind keeps its current style of life. The Anthropocene Extinction deals with the results of mankind's influence on the environment, such as the Great Pacific Garbage Patch.

== Critical reception ==
Professional ratings
Aggregate scores
Source	Rating
Metacritic	86/100
Review scores
Source	Rating
About.com	4.5/5 stars
Exclaim!	9/10
Metal Hammer	4.5/5 stars
MetalSucks	4.5/5 stars
Sputnikmusic	3.1/5
Ultimate Guitar	8.7/10

The album received widespread acclaim from music critics. At Metacritic (a review aggregator site which assigns a normalized rating out of 100 from music critics), based on four critics, the album has received a score of 86/100, which indicates "universal acclaim". Reviews particularly praised Travis Ryan's vocal performance, with Exclaim! writing that "Littered throughout the wasteland of gurgling growls and shrill shrieks that fill The Anthropocene Extinction are the snarls that the vocalist experimented with on 2012's Monolith of Inhumanity, a sort of pseudo-singing that just might be more unsettling than his more traditional death metal scream, and which showcases his impressive range."

About.com praised the variety and songwriting on the album, praising the band's attention to detail: "Cattle Decapitation write albums, a quality that allows each song to fit within the entire grand vision. An interlude like 'The Burden of Seven Billion' may seem like filler, but its placement allows a reprise from a first half of life-draining potency. A similar claim follows the gloomy 'Ave Exitium', which follows in the vein of 'The Harvest Floor' and 'The Monolith' as a haunting intro to a momentous closer in 'Pacific Grim'."

== Track listing ==
All lyrics are written by Travis Ryan; all music is composed by Cattle Decapitation.

No.	Title	Length
1.	"Manufactured Extinct"	4:40
2.	"The Prophets of Loss"	4:07
3.	"Plagueborne"	4:58
4.	"Clandestine Ways (Krokodil Rot)"	4:34
5.	"Circo Inhumanitas"	4:03
6.	"The Burden of Seven Billion"	1:23
7.	"Mammals in Babylon"	4:09
8.	"Mutual Assured Destruction"	2:42
9.	"Not Suitable for Life"	3:16
10.	"Apex Blasphemy"	3:45
11.	"Ave Exitium"	3:06
12.	"Pacific Grim"	5:25
Total length:		46:14

Japanese edition bonus track
No.	Title	Length
13.	"No Light and No Life"	3:24
Total length:		49:34

Limited edition bonus tracks
No.	Title	Length
13.	"Cannibalistic Invasivorism"	4:00
14.	"No Light and No Life"	3:24
Total length:		53:32

Limited edition bonus DVD
No.	Title	Length
1.	"Forced Gender Reassignment" (live at Party San 2012)	3:46
2.	"Your Disposal" (live at Party San 2012)	4:22
3.	"Lifestalker" (live at Party San 2012)	4:14
4.	"Projectile Ovulation" (live at Party San 2012)	3:40
5.	"Kingdom of Tyrants" (live at Party San 2012)	4:33
6.	"Your Disposal" (music video)	4:36
7.	"Kingdom of Tyrants" (music video, extended mini film version)	9:00
8.	"Regret and the Grave" (music video)	4:36
9.	"A Body Farm" (music video)	5:33
10.	"Reduced to Paste" (music video)	4:13
11.	"To Serve Man" (music video)	3:10
12.	"Making of The Anthropocene Extinction" (studio report)	15:50
Total length:		67:27

== Personnel ==
Credits are adapted from the album's liner notes.

Cattle Decapitation

- Travis Ryan – vocals, keyboards, drums on "Ave Exitium"
- Josh Elmore – guitars
- Dave McGraw – drums
- Derek Engemann – bass, additional gang vocals on "The Prophets of Loss", keyboards and drums on "The Burden of Seven Billion"

Guest musicians

- Philip H. Anselmo – narration on "The Prophets of Loss"

Additional musicians

- Author & Punisher – intro of "Plagueborne"
- Jürgen Bartsch (Bethlehem) – spoken word on "Pacific Grim"

Production

- Dave Otero – production, mixing, mastering
- Shane Howard – engineering assistance

Artwork and design

- Wes Benscoter – album artwork, photo editing
- Brian Ames – album layout
- Sam Lanthrem – photography
- Denise Ryan – photography
- Zach Cordner – photography
- Travis Ryan – art direction, concept

Studio

- Flatline Audio, Westminster, Colorado – production, mixing, mastering

== Charts ==
Chart (2015)	Peak position
German Albums (Offizielle Top 100)	88
UK Independent Albums (OCC)	43
UK Rock & Metal Albums (OCC)	22
US Top Album Sales (Billboard)	44
US Billboard 200	100
US Independent Albums (Billboard)	5
US Top Hard Rock Albums (Billboard)	5
US Top Rock Albums (Billboard)	14
US Indie Store Album Sales (Billboard)	11
