= Re-Animated Dead Flesh =

Studio album by Mortician
- Released: October 2004
- Recorded: April—June 2004
- Genre: Brutal death metal; deathgrind
- Length: 39:24
- Label: Mortician Records (Self Released)
- Producer: Will Rahmer; Roger J. Beaujard

Mortician chronology
Zombie Massacre Live! (2004)	Re-Animated Dead Flesh (2004)

Re-Animated Dead Flesh is the fifth full-length studio album by Mortician.

The album was released by Mortician Records and distributed by Crash Music, making it the first Mortician studio album not released by Relapse Records.

== Track listing ==
No.	Title	Length
1.	"Werewolves Curse" (An American Werewolf in London)	3:08
2.	"Burned Alive"	0:48
3.	"Bludgeoned"	1:11
4.	"Marauding Savages" (The Hills Have Eyes)	2:09
5.	"Skinned"	0:56
6.	"Human Beasts" (Night of the Bloody Apes)	2:00
7.	"Bloodsoaked Carnage"	0:49
8.	"Unseen Force Of Death" (The Boogeyman)	3:36
9.	"Torn Apart"	0:48
10.	"Axe" (Axe!)	2:23
11.	"Punishment" (silent night deadly night)	2:16
12.	"Re-Animated Dead Flesh" (Re-Animator)	2:37
13.	"Buzzards"	0:52
14.	"Madman Marz" (Madman)	1:43
15.	"Return To The Grave"	2:24
16.	"Dismembered"	0:57
17.	"The Dead Pit" (The Dead Pit)	2:02
18.	"Crazed For Blood"	0:49
19.	"Slugs" (Slugs)	1:30
20.	"Claws Of Death" (The Fat Black Pussycat)	1:04
21.	"Mass Destruction"	1:28
22.	"Be My Victim" (Candyman)	3:54
Total length:		39:24

The title for track #4, "Marauding Savages", is misprinted on the back cover as "Merauding Savages".

== Personnel ==
Mortician

- Will Rahmer - bass, vocals
- Roger J. Beaujard - guitars, drum programming

Recorded, mixed, and mastered April 2004 - June 2004 at Primitive Recordings Studio

- Mortician — Producer, mixing, and mastering
- Mike Hrubovcak — Artwork
- Tom Woodard and Jeff Wolf — Photography
