= Humanure (album) =

Studio album by Cattle Decapitation
- Released: July 13, 2004
- Studios: Silvercloud Studios, Bvtthole Studios
- Genres: Technical death metal, Deathgrind
- Length: 47:31
- Label: Metal Blade
- Producer: Bill Metoyer

Cattle Decapitation chronology
To Serve Man (2002)	Humanure (2004)	Karma.Bloody.Karma (2006)

Humanure is the second studio album by American deathgrind band Cattle Decapitation. It was released on July 13, 2004 through Metal Blade Records and has been noted for its iconic cover art, depicting a cow defecating what appears to be human body parts in a wasteland environment — the image has been compared to the artwork for Pink Floyd’s album Atom Heart Mother. Humanure generated some minor controversy around the time of release for its obscene imagery.

The album's opening track "Scatology Domine" (the title of which is a Pink Floyd reference, in this case to the song "Astronomy Domine") is a cover of the opening of Beethoven's Moonlight Sonata. Gabe Serbian, Justin Pearson, and Robert Bray of The Locust made guest appearances on the album, along with former member Scott Miller. A music video was produced for "Reduced to Paste".

== Artwork ==
The album cover, which has been compared to the cover for Pink Floyd’s album Atom Heart Mother, was drawn by artist Wes Benscoter. The cover depicting a cow defecating flesh and blood was deemed grotesque by most retailers, who refused to carry it unless it were altered. Because of this, a reissue of Humanure was released by Metal Blade with the cow omitted, leaving just the barren wasteland visible.

In an interview with Revolver, Benscoter claimed that the art's similarity to Pink Floyd's album was not intentional, and he did not even look at the artwork for Atom Heart Mother until the Humanure piece was already finished.

Joe Davita of Loudwire referred to it as one of the scariest heavy metal album covers of all time.

== Critical reception ==
Professional ratings
Review scores
Source	Rating
AllMusic	3.5/5 stars
Exclaim!	favorable
Metal Review	84/100
Metal Storm	7.5/10
Scream Magazine	4/6

Exclaim! wrote: "These CA sickos have honed their death-grind skills down to perfection now; harnessing the early Carcass sound and adding in modern death metal ingredients, CD are one of the best doing this sound today." Orlando Weekly wrote that "Cattle Decapitation again provide a potent antidote to the prevalent knucklehead mindset that defines most metal."

== Track listing ==
No.	Title	Length
1.	"Scatology Domine (Intro)"	1:02
2.	"Humanure"	3:05
3.	"Reduced to Paste"	4:13
4.	"Bukkake Tsunami"	4:33
5.	"Cloacula: The Anthropophagic Copromantik"	3:05
6.	"Chummified"	3:43
7.	"Applied Human Defragmentation"	5:19
8.	"The Earthling"	3:27
9.	"Polyps"	4:24
10.	"Lips & Assholes"	4:56
11.	"Men Before Swine (Outro)"	9:40

Japanese edition bonus tracks
No.	Title	Length
12.	"I Eat Your Skin" (live)
13.	"Reduce to Paste" (live)
Total length:		47:27

== Personnel ==
=== Cattle Decapitation ===
- Travis Ryan – vocals, ebow on "Scatology Domine (Intro)"
- Josh Elmore – guitars
- Troy Oftedal – bass
- Michael Laughlin – drums

=== Other musicians ===
- Gabe Serbian – backing vocals on "Lips & Assholes"
- Justin Pearson – backing vocals on "Lips & Assholes"
- Robert Bray – backing vocals on "Lips & Assholes"
- Troy Oftedal – guitar and tannerin on "Scatology Domine (Intro)"
- Nocturnal Overlord – piano on "Scatology Domine (Intro)"
- Scott Miller – electronics on "Men Before Swine"
- Chris Pooley – electronics on "Men Before Swine"

=== Production ===
- Bill Metoyer – engineering, mixing
- Brad Vance – mastering
