= Deceased (band) =

American extreme metal band

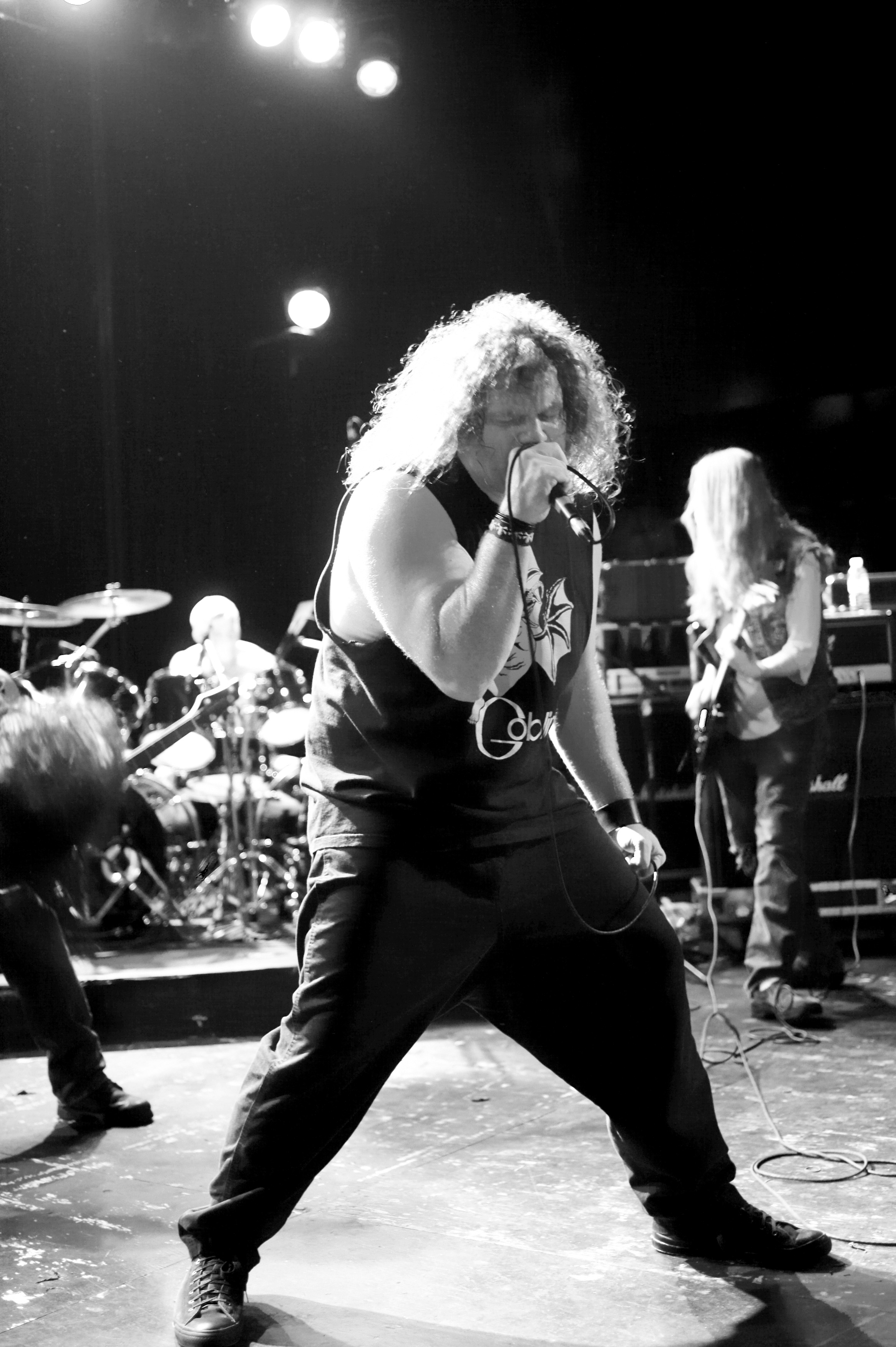
- Deceased in 2005

Background information
- Origin: Arlington, Virginia, U.S.
- Genres: Death metal, thrash metal, heavy metal
- Years active: 1985–present
- Labels: Relapse, PATAC, Thrash Corner, Hells Headbangers
- Members: King Fowley; Les Snyder; Mike Smith; Shane Fuegel; Amos Rifkin

Deceased (often stylized as DECEASED...) is an American death/thrash metal band from Virginia. In 1990, they were the first band to sign with Relapse Records, and released four albums and a number of EPs before parting ways with the label in 2003. Their sound centers around themes of horror, with lyrics barked and sometimes narrated by vocalist and founder King Fowley.

== History ==
King Fowley and guitarist Doug Souther started the band in 1985 in Arlington, Virginia with a goal to "out-thrash Slayer". They experimented with a number of band names, formations and styles before settling on the Deceased name and first real lineup in 1986 consisting of Fowley on drums and vocals, Mark Adams joining Souther on guitar, and bassist Rob Sterzel. Tragedy struck the group on March 3, 1988, when Sterzel and several friends, including the brother of guitarist Doug Souther, were killed in a hit-and-run accident. Les Snyder became the bassist later that year. Souther quit and was replaced by Mike Smith in 1991. The lineup of King Fowley, Mike Smith, Mark Adams, and Les Snyder lasted over a decade and recorded some of the group's most celebrated works. Changes began to reshape the band in 2003, when Dave "Scarface" Castillo stepped in as drummer, enabling Fowley to be frontman and vocalist. Mark Adams left in 2007 and was replaced by Shane Fuegel. Mike Smith retired from live performances in 2006, but remains a key songwriter and studio guitarist. Les Snyder relocated to Texas in 2009 and usually performs live for shows close to home.

Since leaving Relapse, Deceased have continuously released new material, including As the Weird Travel On (Thrash Corner Records) in 2005, an independent vinyl-only live album entitled Blood Orgy in College Park – Stalking the Airwaves in 2010, and the more recent LP Surreal Overdose in 2011 on their own Shrieks From the Hearse label in conjunction with PATAC Records. The November 2012 issue of Decibel contained a flexi-disc of an exclusive new track "The Luck of the Corpse". A split 12" with the band Conceived By Hate, titled "The Figure of Uneasiness", was released in the fall of 2014 on El Salvador's Morbid Skull label, featuring four live-in-the-studio recordings with the current live lineup. A new album, entitled Ghostly White, was released in 2018 through Hells Headbangers Records. Drummer David "Scarface" Castillo sadly drowned in November 2018. The band knew Dave would want them to carry on and found a drummer in friend Amos Rifkin and played live gigs all of 2019 as well as releasing a tribute live recording of one of Dave's last shows with the band called 'Death Metal from the Dave" to honor him. In June 2020 they released Rotten to the Core Part 2 [the Nightmare Continues] an all covers release of old punk/hardcore songs on Malt Soda Records. 2021 saw the band release an all thrash cover songs record called Thrash Times at Ridgemont High on Hells Headbangers Records in October. They released their most recent album, Children of the Morgue, on August 30, 2024.

== Members ==
Current members

- Kingsley "King" Fowley – vocals (1985–present), drums (1985–2003, 2008–2012)
- Mike Smith – guitar (1990–present)
- Shane Fuegel – guitar (2007–present)
- Les Snyder – bass (1988–present)
- Amos Rifkin – drums (2018–present)

Former members

- Mark Adams – guitar (1985–2007)
- Doug Souther – guitar (1985–1990)
- Rob Sterzel – bass (1985–1988; died 1988)
- David Castillo – drums (2003–2008, 2012–2018; died 2018)

== Discography ==
=== Demos ===
- The Evil Side of Religion (1986)
- Birth by Radiation (1988)
- Nuclear Exorcist (1989)
- One Night in the Cemetery (1989)
- Live with the Legions (1992)
- Demo I 1995 (1995)
- Demo II 1995 (1995)

=== Studio albums ===
- Luck of the Corpse (1991)
- The Blueprints for Madness (1995)
- Fearless Undead Machines (1997)
- Supernatural Addiction (2000)
- As the Weird Travel On (2005)
- Surreal Overdose (2011)
- Ghostly White (2018)
- Children of the Morgue (2024)

=== EPs ===
- Gut Wrench (1991)
- 13 Frightened Souls (1993)
- Behind the Mourner's Veil (2001)
- Inject the Ugliness (2007)
- The Triangle (2023)

=== Live albums ===
- Up the Tombstones!!! Live 2000 (2002)
- Blood Orgy in College Park – Stalking the Airwaves!!! (2010)
- The Figure of Uneasiness (2014)
- Death Metal from the Dave (2019)

=== Compilations ===
- Death Metal from the Grave (1996) – Compilation of demo and live tracks
- The Radiation Years (2002) – Compilation of demo tracks
- Zombie Hymns (2002) – Compilation of cover songs
- Corpses, Souls & Other Strangeness (2003) – Featuring Luck of the Corpse, 13 Frightened Souls and bonus tracks
- Return to the Evil Side (2004) – Compilation of demo and live tracks
- Legions of Arrggghhhh – Compilation of demo and live tracks
- Night of the Deceased (2009) – Compilation of studio tracks included free with the March 2009 issue of Hard Rocker Magazine
- Worship the Coffin (2009) – Compilation of demo tracks
- Cadaver Traditions (2015) – Compilation of cover songs
- Demos from the Grave (2015) – Compilation of demo tracks

=== Cover albums ===
- Rotten to the Core (2004)
- Rotten to the Core Part 2 [The Nightmare Continues] (2020)
- Thrash Times at Ridgemont High (2021)

=== Compilation appearances ===
Year	Compilation	Label	Song	Album
1992	Death...Is Just the Beginning II	Relapse Records	"The 13 Frightened Souls"	Rough version
1993	5 Years Nuclear Blast	Nuclear Blast	"Nuclear Exorcist"	13 Frightened Souls
1993	Corporate Death (A Relapse Multi Death Compilation)	Relapse Records	"Robotic Village"	13 Frightened Souls
1995	Death...Is Just the Beginning III	Relapse Records	"Creek of the Dead"	The Blueprints for Madness
1995	UHF/VHF	Relapse Records	"Midnight"	The Blueprints for Madness
1995	HUH CD 7	Huh Music Service	"The Triangle"	The Blueprints for Madness
1995	2 Noise Pollution (Terrorizer Magazine Free CD April 1995)	Triumphington Publishing Company	"Alternate Dimensions"	The Blueprints for Madness
1995	Nuclear Blast Soundcheck Series: Volume 3	Nuclear Blast	"Midnight"	The Blueprints for Madness
1995	Traces of Death III	Relapse Records	"Into the Bizarre"	The Blueprints for Madness
1996	Audio Espionage	Ax/ction Records	"Robotic Village" (Live)	Recorded at The Cave, Manassas VA (3/11/94)
1997	Promo	Relapse Records	"Fearless Undead Machines"	Fearless Undead Machines
1998	Solid:Strip Mining the Underground Since 1990	Relapse Records	"Graphic Repulsion"	Fearless Undead Machines
1998	Contamination MCMXCVII (Polluting the Scene Since 1990)	Relapse Records	"Beyond Science"	Fearless Undead Machines
1998	Mercyful Fate Tribute	Listenable Records	"Nuns Have No Fun"	Previously unreleased Mercyful Fate cover
1999	Relapse Records Sampler Spring 1999	Relapse Records	"Beyond Science"	Fearless Undead Machines
1999	A Call to Irons 2: A Tribute to Iron Maiden	Dwell Records	"2 Minutes to Midnight"	Previously unreleased Iron Maiden cover
1999	Land of the Wizard: A Tribute to Ozzy Osbourne	Dwell Records	"S.A.T.O."	Previously unreleased Ozzy Osbourne cover
1999	Dead Forever: Tribute to Motörhead	Dwell Records	"Stay Clean"	Previously unreleased Motörhead cover
1999	A Tribute to Mercyful Fate	Still Dead Records	"Doomed by the Living Dead"	Previously unreleased Mercyful Fate cover
2000	Contaminated 3.0	Relapse Records	"A Very Familiar Stranger"	Supernatural Addiction
2000	Wizards of Gore: A Tributo to Impetigo	Razorback Records	"Dis-organ-ized"	Previously unreleased Impetigo cover
2001	Contaminated 4.0	Relapse Records	"It's Alive"	Behind the Mourner's Veil
2001	Under the Guillotine: Tribute to Kreator	Dwell Records	"Tormentor"	Previously unreleased Kreator cover
2002	We Don't Need Society: Tribute to D.R.I.	Malt Soda Records	"Madman"	Previously unreleased D.R.I. cover
