= Karma.Bloody.Karma =

Studio album by Cattle Decapitation
- Released: July 11, 2006
- Genre: Deathgrind
- Length: 40:44
- Label: Metal Blade
- Producer: Billy Anderson

Cattle Decapitation chronology
Humanure (2004)	Karma.Bloody.Karma (2006)	The Harvest Floor (2009)

Professional ratings
Review scores
Source	Rating
AllMusic	4/5 stars
Blabbermouth.net	8/10
Exclaim!	favorable
Metal Storm	8/10

Karma.Bloody.Karma is the third studio album by deathgrind band Cattle Decapitation. It was released on July 11, 2006. The track "Total Gore?" features guest vocals from Joey Karam of The Locust. It is the last album to feature drummer Michael Laughlin.

The album cover depicts a figure resembling the Hindu deity Shiva, while the album name refers to karma, a concept attributed to Hinduism, Buddhism, Jainism, Sikhism, and Taoism. In an interview with Aggressive Tendencies, Travis Ryan explained that the album cover was actually a plan B.

== Track listing ==
No.	Title	Length
1.	"Intro"	0:19
2.	"Unintelligent Design"	3:38
3.	"Success Is...(Hanging by the Neck)"	3:34
4.	"One Thousand Times Decapitation"	1:03
5.	"The Carcass Derrick"	3:44
6.	"Total Gore?"	3:11
7.	"Bereavement"	1:44
8.	"Suspended in Coprolite"	4:20
9.	"Alone at the Landfill"	7:37
10.	"Karma.Bloody.Karma."	3:05
11.	"The New Dawn"	5:13
12.	"Of Human Pride and Flatulence"	3:14
Total length:		40:44

Japanese edition bonus track
No.	Title	Length
13.	"World Full of Idiots"	2:23

== Personnel ==
=== Cattle Decapitation ===
- Travis Ryan – vocals
- Josh Elmore – guitars, EBow ("Of Human Pride and Flatulence")
- Troy Oftedal – bass, piano ("Alone at the Landfill")
- Michael Laughlin – drums

=== Additional personnel ===
- John Wiese – electronics
- Joey Karam – vocals ("Total Gore?"), keyboards ("Total Gore?", "Of Human Pride and Flatulence")
- Billy Anderson – producer
