= Chainsaw Dismemberment =

1999 album by Mortician

Studio album by Mortician
- Released: July 6, 1999
- Recorded: March–April 1999
- Genre: Brutal death metal; grindcore
- Length: 49:14
- Label: Relapse
- Producer: Roger Beaujard; Mortician; Matthew F. Jacobson (exec.)

Mortician chronology
Zombie Apocalypse (1998)	Chainsaw Dismemberment (1999)	Domain of Death (2001)

Professional ratings
Review scores
Source	Rating
AllMusic	2.5/5 stars
BW&BK	9/10 stars
Rock Hard	7.5/10 stars
Sea of Tranquility	3/5 stars
Metal.de	9/10 stars

Chainsaw Dismemberment is the second studio album by American death metal band Mortician, released on July 6, 1999 by Relapse Records.

== Style ==
Chainsaw Dismemberment contains what have been described as "jackhammer" guitar riffs, drum machines, guttural vocals, and samples pulled from horror films.

== Reception ==
Steve Huey of AllMusic said "Chainsaw Dismemberment doesn't really offer anything brand-new from Mortician," stating his belief that "the faithful will be satisfied."

== Track listing ==
No.	Title	Length
1.	"Stab" (When a Stranger Calls)	3:53
2.	"Fleshripper"	0:54
3.	"Drowned in Your Blood"	1:44
4.	"Mass Mutilation" (Henry: Portrait of a Serial Killer)	1:47
5.	"Mauled Beyond Recognition" (Silent Night, Bloody Night)	0:51
6.	"Rabid" (I Drink Your Blood)	2:01
7.	"Bloodshed"	1:15
8.	"Decayed" (Leatherface: The Texas Chainsaw Massacre III)	1:49
9.	"Final Bloodbath"	1:09
10.	"Island of the Dead" (Zombi 2)	3:56
11.	"Brutalized"	0:55
12.	"Slaughtered" (Bloodeaters)	1:30
13.	"The Crazies" (The Crazies)	1:18
14.	"Silent Night, Bloody Night" (Silent Night, Bloody Night)	1:58
15.	"Chainsaw Dismemberment" (The Texas Chainsaw Massacre 2)	2:39
16.	"Psychotic Rage"	0:52
17.	"Funeral Feast"	1:41
18.	"Wolfen" (Wolfen)	1:03
19.	"Dark Sanity"	1:27
20.	"Camp Blood" (Friday the 13th Part 2)	2:13
21.	"Tormented"	1:26
22.	"Slaughterhouse (Part II)" (Slaughterhouse)	2:18
23.	"Barbarian"	1:22
24.	"Rats" (Rats: Night of Terror)	1:36
25.	"Mater Tenebrarum" (Inferno)	2:23
26.	"Splattered"	0:49
27.	"Obliteration"	1:18
28.	"Lord of the Dead (Mortician Part II)" (Phantasm II)	2:54
Total length:		49:14

== Personnel ==
Mortician

- Will Rahmer - bass, vocals
- Desmond Tolhurst - guitar
- Roger Beaujard - guitar, drum programming

Production

- Roger Beaujard - producer, engineer
- Will Rahmer - assistant engineer, photography
- Mortician - producers
- Matthew F. Jacobson - executive producer
- Roger Beaujard - engineer
- Dave Shirk - mastering
- Wes Benscoter - cover art
- Brian Henry - design
- Danny Nelson - photography
