= Domain of Death =

2001 album by Mortician

Studio album by Mortician
- Released: April 17, 2001
- Recorded: July 2000
- Genre: Brutal death metal; grindcore
- Length: 36:38
- Label: Relapse
- Producer: Roger Beaujard, Matthew F. Jacobson (exec.)

Mortician chronology
Chainsaw Dismemberment (1999)	Domain of Death (2001)	Darkest Day of Horror (2003)

Professional ratings
Review scores
Source	Rating
*Allmusic	2.5/5 stars

Domain of Death is the third studio album by American death metal band Mortician, released on April 17, 2001 by Relapse Records.

== Track listing ==
No.	Title	Length
1.	"Brood of Evil" (The Brood (1979))	2:34
2.	"Maimed and Mutilated"	0:46
3.	"Bonecrusher"	1:04
4.	"The Hatchet Murders" (Deep Red (1975))	1:52
5.	"Extinction of Mankind"	0:38
6.	"Domain of Death" (Mark of the Devil (1970))	3:34
7.	"Cannibalized"	0:52
8.	"Pulsating Protoplasma" (Pungent Stench cover)	2:44
9.	"Martin (The Vampire)" (Martin (1978))	1:48
10.	"Telepathic Terror" (Scanners (1981))	4:01
11.	"Mutilation of the Human Race"	0:41
12.	"Wasteland of Death"	1:10
13.	"Dr. Gore" (The Body Shop (1973))	2:15
14.	"Extra Uterine Pregnancy" (Disastrous Murmur cover)	4:24
15.	"Tenebrae" (Tenebrae (1982))	2:18
16.	"Devastation"	0:55
17.	"Necronomicon Exmortis" (Evil Dead II)	5:02
Total length:		36:38

== Personnel ==
Mortician

- Will Rahmer – bass, vocals
- Roger Beaujard – guitar, drum programming

Production

- Roger Beaujard – producer, engineer
- Will Rahmer – assistant engineer
- Matthew F. Jacobson – executive producer
- Wes Benscoter – cover art
- Frank White – photography
- Jonathan Canady – design
