= Supernatural Addiction =

Studio album by Deceased
- Released: February 29, 2000
- Recorded: Oblivion Studios, September 1999
- Genre: Thrash metal; death metal; heavy metal
- Length: 47:52
- Label: Relapse Records
- Producer: Simon Efemey

Deceased chronology
Fearless Undead Machines (1997)	Supernatural Addiction (2000)	Behind the Mourner's Veil (2001)

Professional ratings
Review scores
Source	Rating
AllMusic	3.5/5 stars
Chronicles of Chaos	9/10
Rock Hard	7/10

Supernatural Addiction is the fourth studio album by the thrash metal/death metal band Deceased. It was their last full-length album on Relapse Records.

== Production ==
The album was produced by Simon Efemey. Each song was inspired by a different horror tale, movie, or show.

== Critical reception ==
AllMusic wrote that Deceased "temper their death-metal fury with a love for old-school thrash, which actually works well for them, keeping the music from getting too cartoonish." CMJ New Music Report wrote that "[King] Fowley proudly and loudly prefers the glory days of superfast metal, when patches on acid-washed denim jackets reigned supreme and there was no rap or glam in sight."

== Track listing ==
No.	Title	Length
1.	"The Premonition"	5:35
2.	"Dark Chilling Heartbeat"	6:26
3.	"A Very Familiar Stranger"	5:18
4.	"Frozen Screams"	5:04
5.	"The Doll with the Hideous Spirit"	5:34
6.	"The Hanging Soldier"	4:20
7.	"Chambers of the Waiting Blind"	7:50
8.	"Elly's Dementia"	7:42

=== Inspirations ===
- The Twilight Zone, episode "Twenty-Two" (written by Rod Serling)
- "The Tell-Tale Heart" (written by Edgar Allan Poe)
- Famous Ghost Stories, segment "The Hitchhiker" (written by Oscar Brand)
- Asylum, segment "Frozen Fear" (written by Robert Bloch)
- Trilogy of Terror, segment "Amelia" (written by Richard Matheson)
- An Occurrence at Owl Creek Bridge (written by Ambrose Bierce)
- Tales from the Crypt, segment "Blind Alley" (written by William Gaines)
- The Blair Witch Project (written by Daniel Myrick and Eduardo Sanchez)

== Personnel ==
- King Fowley – drums, vocals, keyboards
- Mike Smith – guitars
- Mark Adams – guitars
- Les Snyder – bass

Other credits

- Mike Bossier – engineer
- Simon Efemey – producer, keyboards on "Elly's Dementia"
- Jessica Scott – voice on "A Very Familiar Stranger"
- Allen Koszowski – cover art
- Jason Van Hollander – cover art coloring
- Eric Horst – cover art coloring
- Flo Homer – photos
