= Richard Ciupka =

Canadian cinematographer

Richard Ciupka is a Canadian cinematographer and film director. He is perhaps best known for his work on the 1983 horror film Curtains, as well as his collaborations with Louis Malle on the 1980 film Atlantic City, Alexandre Arcady on the 1985 film Hold-Up and Claude Chabrol on three feature films in France. Ciupka also filmed or directed over 520 television commercials in Canada and the United States. His work on the Canadian drama series Nouvelle adresse garnered him a Gémeaux award for "Best Cinematography (Dramatic)."

== Career ==
Born in Liège, Belgium, Ciupka immigrated to the United States at age six. His first work as a cinematographer was on the Canadian film The Mystery of the Million Dollar Hockey Puck (1975) followed by Ilsa, the Tigress of Siberia (1977) and the television film An American Christmas Carol (1979). He made his directorial debut with the horror film Curtains (1983); however, Ciupka left the production midway through over creative differences with producer Peter R. Simpson and is credited as Jonathan Stryker. Since 2013, Richard has worked as a cinematographer on TV series and feature films. Richard also produced and Directed/Photograohed over 520 TV commercials in Canada and the USA.

== Filmography ==
=== Director ===
Year	Title	Notes
1983	Curtains	As Jonathan Stryker
1991–92	Heritage Minutes	Series; 14 episodes
1992	Coyote	
1998	Emily of New Moon	Episode: "The Book of Yesterday"
1998	The Hunger	Episode: "The Face of Helene Bournouw"
1999	The Last Breath (Le Dernier souffle)	
2000	Task Force	TV movie
2002	The Mysterious Miss C. (La mystérieuse Mademoiselle C.)	
2004	The Incomparable Miss C. (L'incomparable mademoiselle C.)	
2006	Duo	

=== Cinematographer ===
Year	Title	Notes
1975	The Mystery of the Million Dollar Hockey Puck	
1977	Ilsa, the Tigress of Siberia	
1979	An American Christmas Carol	TV movie
1980	It Rained All Night the Day I Left	
1980	Atlantic City	
1981	Yesterday	
1981	Dirty Tricks	
1982	Melanie	
1983	The Terry Fox Story	TV movie
1983	Joy	
1984	The Blood of Others	
1984	Heartsounds	TV movie
1984	The Guardian	TV movie
1985	Secret Weapons	TV movie
1985	Hold-Up	
2014–15	Nouvelle adresse	series; 34 episodes
2017	Love Locks	TV movie
2021	Un Lien Familial	TV movie
