= Will Rahmer =

American death metal musician

- Born: Will Rahmer; September 30, 1969 (age 56)
- Origin: Yonkers, New York, U.S.
- Genres: Death metal
- Occupations: Musician, songwriter
- Instruments: Vocals, bass
- Years active: 1989–present
- Member of: Mortician
- Formerly of: Incantation

Will Rahmer (born September 30, 1969) is an American musician. He was the vocalist in the death metal band Incantation temporarily during mid-1990, while forming Mortician with drummer Matt Sicher and guitarist Matt Harshner. Rahmer is the lyricist, vocalist, and bassist for Mortician, and is heavily influenced by horror movies, of which he is a collector. Known for his extremely guttural vocals, Rahmer is the co-founder of New York Death Militia and the founder of Redrum Records.

== Discography ==
=== Demos ===
- Rehearsal 12/14/89
- Demo #1 1990

=== Albums ===
- Hacked Up for Barbecue (1996)
- Chainsaw Dismemberment (1999)
- Domain of Death (2001)
- Darkest Day of Horror Tour Edition (2002)
- Darkest Day of Horror (2003)
- Re-Animated Dead Flesh (2004)

=== EPs and singles ===
- "Brutally Mutilated" (7" single, 1990)
- "Mortal Massacre" (7" single, 1991)
- Mortal Massacre (EP, 1993)
- "House by the Cemetery" (7" single, 1994)
- House by the Cemetery (EP, 1995)
- "Zombie Apocalypse" (7" single, 1998)
- Zombie Apocalypse (EP, 1998)
- Living Dead (Split, 2004)

=== Compilations ===
- Gummo soundtrack

=== Live albums ===
- The Final Bloodbath Session (Live drummer studio sessions, 2002)
- Zombie Massacre Live! (2004)
