= 13 Faces of Death =

13 Faces Of Death

Studio album by Embalmer
- Released: October 13, 2006
- Genre: Death metal
- Length: 43:37
- Label: Pathos

Embalmer chronology
There Was Blood Everywhere (1997)	13 Faces Of Death (2006)	Collection Of Carnage (2012)

13th Faces of Death is an album released by the death metal band Embalmer on October 13, 2006. It was the band's first full-length album. A number of songs, including "Rotten Body Fluids," "There Was Blood Everywhere," and "Into the Oven," were re-recorded for this full-length album.

Reviews weren't generally positive, such as one from CD Baby that claimed that 13 Faces Of Death is "guaranteed to peel back your eggs."

== Track listing ==
No.	Title	Length
1.	"Scourged of Your Innocence"	5:07
2.	"They Can Smell Our Blood"	4:31
3.	"Beheaded Without A Drop Spilt"	2:50
4.	"Limbs In The Grinder"	2:21
5.	"Vengeance Through Homicide"	3:23
6.	"Mutilation At The Altar"	3:34
7.	"Horrific Disdain [sic]"	4:44
8.	"Rotten Body Fluids"	3:11
9.	"There Was Blood Everywhere"	2:12
10.	"The More Fuckers Dead, The Better"	3:03
11.	"Into The Oven"	4:26
12.	"Devil's Night"	2:30
13.	"XIII"	1:45
