= Cattle Decapitation =

American extreme metal band

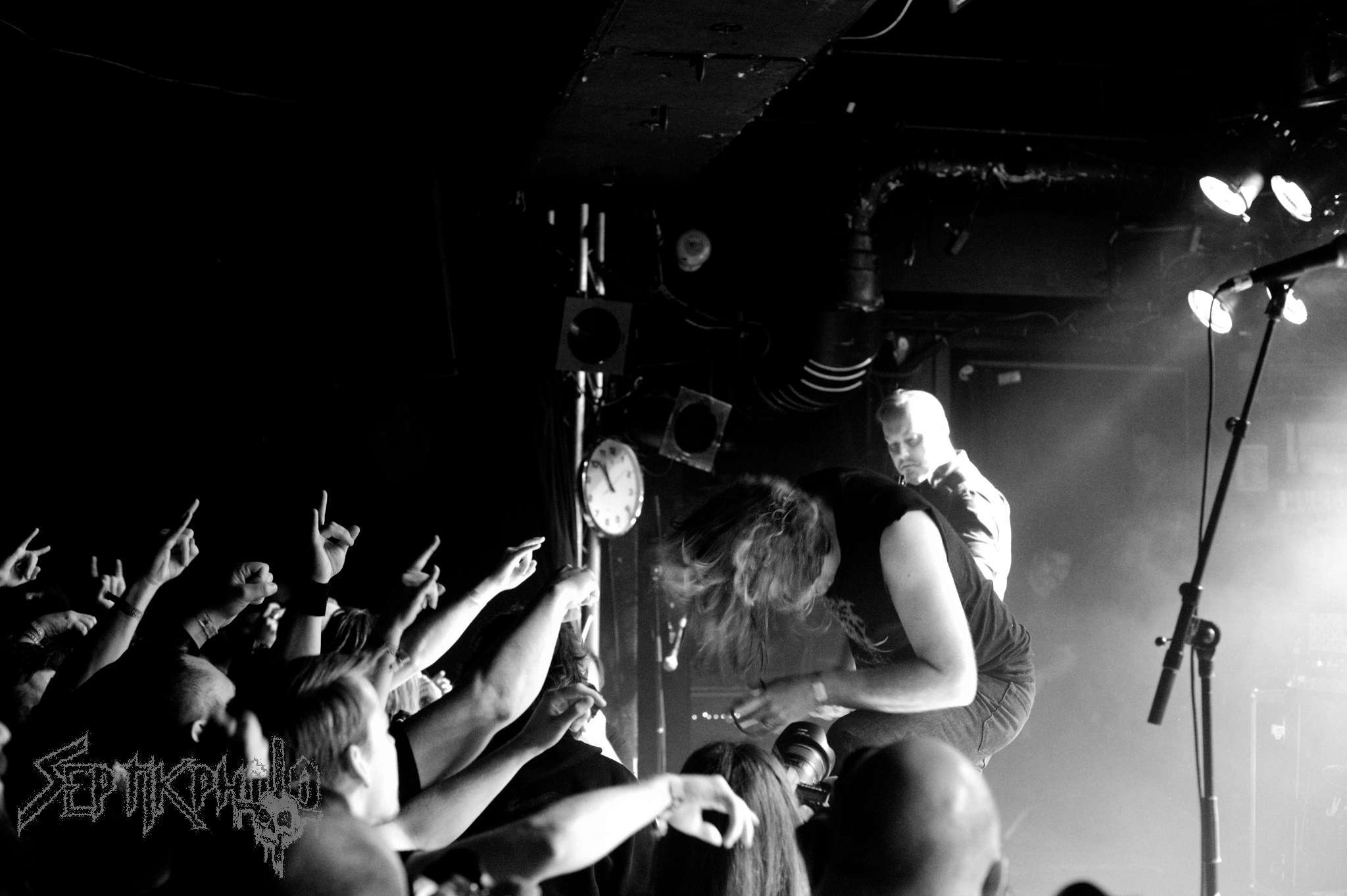
- Cattle Decapitation performing at Inferno festival in Norway, 2016

Background information
- Also known as: Cattle Decap
- Origin: San Diego, California, U.S.
- Genres: Deathgrind; grindcore; technical death metal; goregrind (early)
- Years active: 1996–present
- Labels: Satan's Pimp; Three One G; Accident Prone; Metal Blade; War Torn
- Members: Travis Ryan; Josh Elmore; Dave McGraw; Belisario Dimuzio; Diego Soria
- Past members: Scott Miller; Gabe Serbian; Dave Astor; Michael Laughlin; Troy Oftedal; Derek Engemann; Olivier Pinard
- Website: cattledecapitation.com

Cattle Decapitation is an American deathgrind band formed in San Diego, California, in 1996. The band's current lineup includes vocalist Travis Ryan, lead guitarist Josh Elmore, drummer Dave McGraw, rhythm guitarist Belisario Dimuzio, and bassist Diego Soria. Since 2001, none of the founding members remain with the band. Despite not being in the original lineup, Ryan and Elmore are the only constant members on all of Cattle Decapitation's eight studio albums.

== History ==
Singer/guitarist Scott Miller, drummer Gabe Serbian, and bassist Dave Astor formed Cattle Decapitation in 1996. The band put out their first material in 1996 with a demo called Ten Torments of the Damned. Miller left the band in circa 1997. Serbian assumed the guitar and shared drums duties with Astor, and Travis Ryan joined the band as the new vocalist. They recorded their first EP, Human Jerky, 1999, and their second EP, Homovore, in 2000. The two EPs were recorded at Double Time Studios with recording engineer Jeff Forrest. Gabe Serbian left the band 2001 to focus on The Locust. Guitarist Josh Elmore and bassist Troy Oftedal joined the band right after, so Astor focused on the drums.

Cattle Decapitation's first album, To Serve Man, came out in 2002. It was controversial in Germany, where distribution company SPV refused to handle the album due to its graphic cover. Astor left the band the following year and was replaced with Michael Laughlin, who stayed in the band until 2008, when Dave McGraw took over drums. The cover of the 2004 album Humanure, featuring a cow excreting human remains, was reportedly censored without permission from the label in some outlets. Record store owners did not display the album, making it difficult for customers to find and buy it.

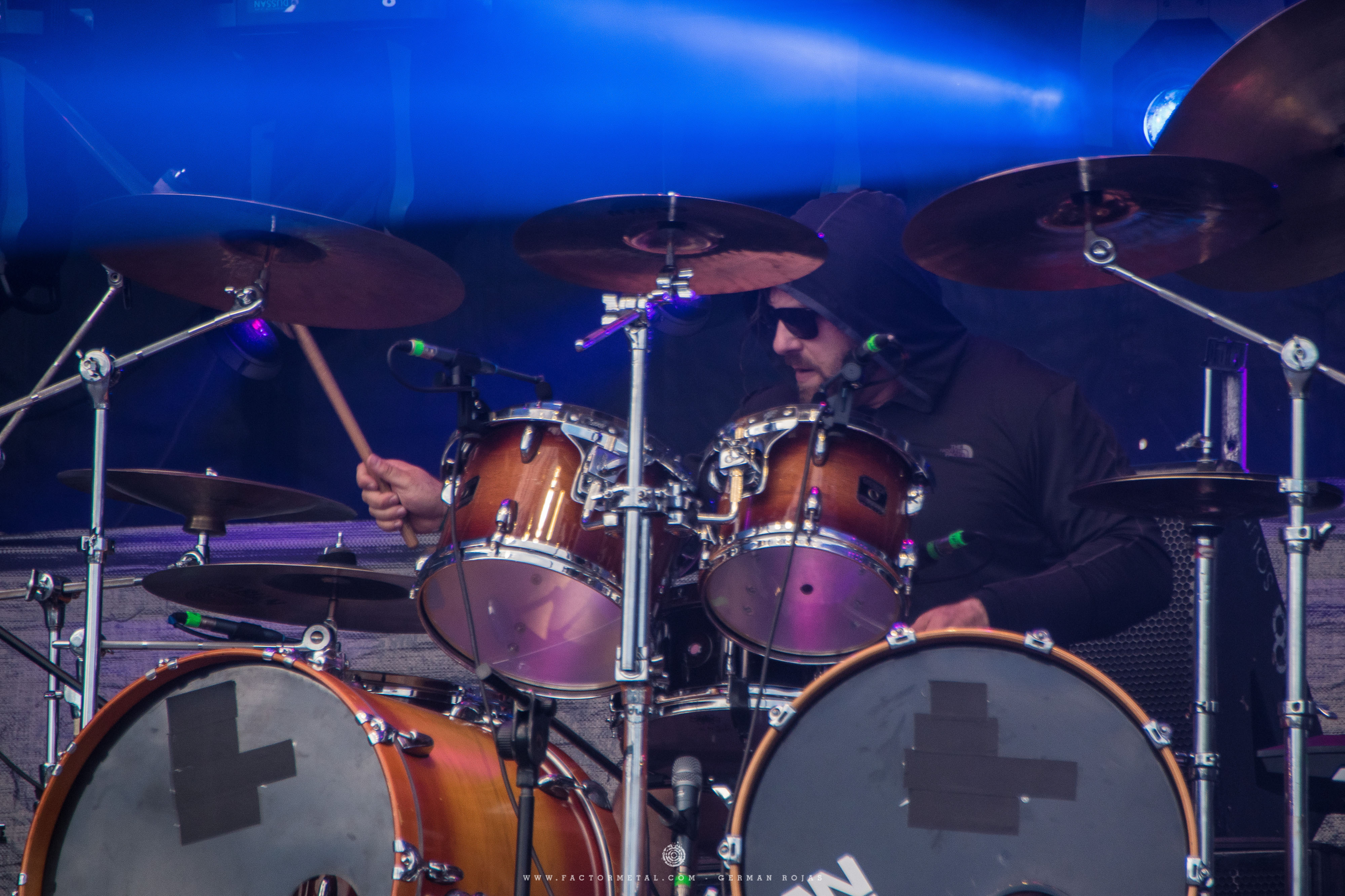
Dave McGraw in 2018

In August 2009, Cattle Decapitation parted ways with bassist Troy Oftedal because of "musical and personal differences". Cattle Decapitation's album Monolith of Inhumanity was released in 2012. It received positive reviews upon release.

Cattle Decapitation has toured with extreme metal acts including Suffocation, Cryptopsy, The Black Dahlia Murder, Deicide, Behemoth, Hate Eternal, Krisiun, Revocation, and Job for a Cowboy. The band participated in Metal Blade Records' Scion A/V Showcase in late 2012.

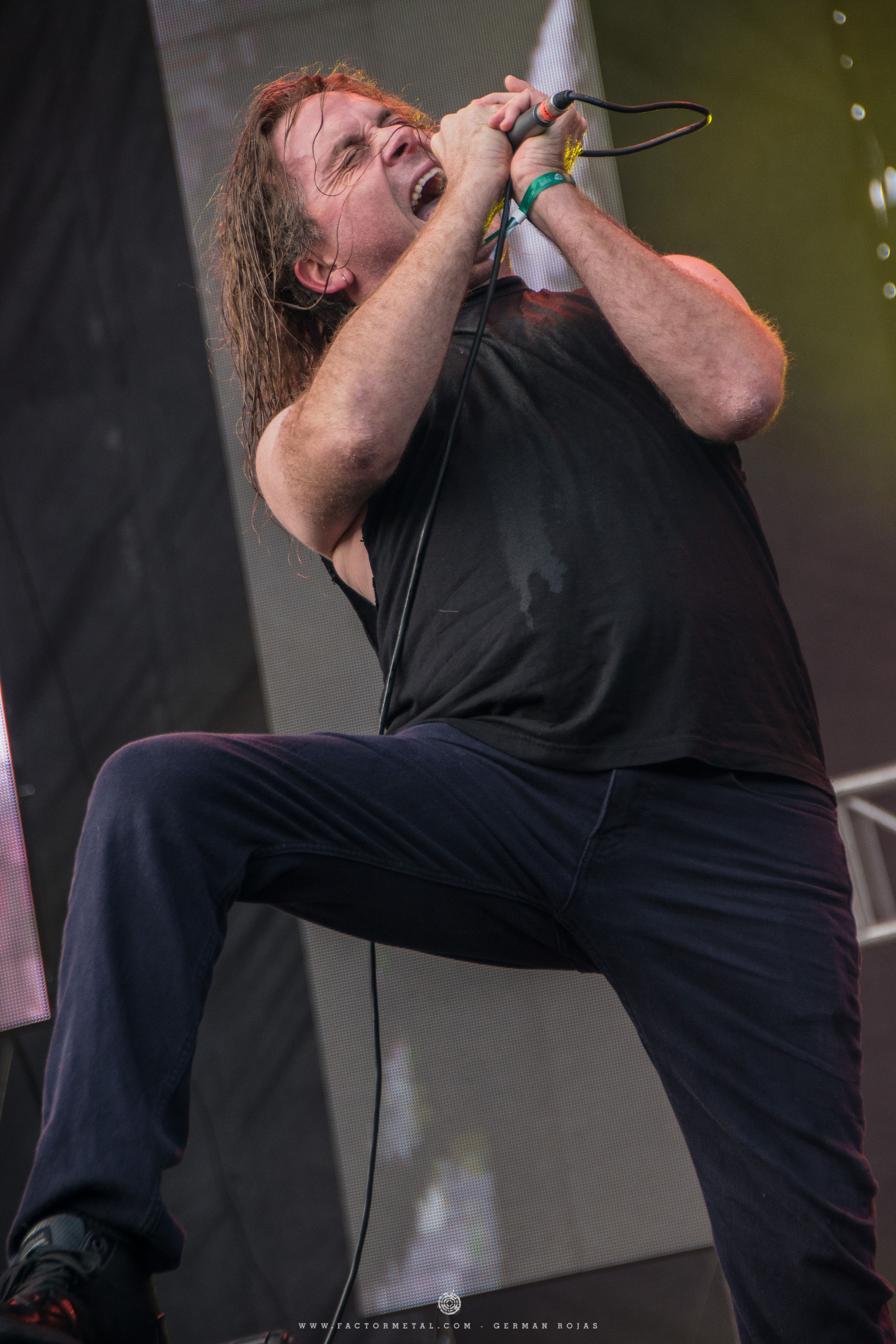
Travis Ryan in 2018

The band spent most of 2014 writing The Anthropocene Extinction. Alongside the announcement of the album title in May 2015, the band released the first song of the record, "Manufactured Extinct". It was released through Metal Blade on August 7, 2015.

On April 30, 2018, two Native American teens were pulled out of a Colorado State University tour by the police for being "too quiet" and wearing "dark clothing." When the band found out that one of the brothers was wearing Cattle Decapitation T-shirts, they offered the brothers "free guest list spots for life."

In August 2018, the band announced the addition of Cryptopsy bass player Olivier Pinard and promoted touring rhythm guitarist Belisario Dimuzio to full-time membership, making the group a five-piece for the first time. The recording of the seventh studio album, Death Atlas, began in May 2019, and was released on November 29, 2019.

In November 2022, the band announced at a concert in Las Vegas that they planned to release a new album in May 2023. At the show, they played the new song "We Eat Our Young" from the upcoming, then-unnamed album.

The band released their eighth album, Terrasite, on May 12, 2023.

In mid-April 2025, Oliver Pinard announced his departure from the band to focus on Cryptopsy and his personal life.

In May 2025, Metal Blade Records and NJV Media released the feature-length documentary From This Flesh: A Cattle Decapitation Story. The documentary was filmed during the recording sessions for Terrasite and focuses on the production of the album and the history of the band.

Cattle Decapitation are scheduled to tour in 2026. The band was confirmed to be performing at the 2026 Sonic Temple music festival in Columbus, Ohio. They will also appear at Welcome to Rockville, which will take place in Daytona Beach, Florida in May 2026.

== Musical style and lyrical themes ==
Loudwire called Cattle Decapitation technical death metal. Metal author and journalist Garry Sharpe-Young once acknowledged the band as "one of the few metal bands whose message hits as hard as their music".

Lyrical themes explored by the band include decapitation, dissection, mutilation, misanthropy, animal rights, and veganism.

== Band members ==
=== Current ===
- Travis Ryan – vocals (1997–present), keyboards (1997–2019)
- Josh Elmore – lead guitar (2001–present)
- Dave McGraw – drums, percussion (2007–present)
- Belisario Dimuzio – rhythm guitar (2018–present; touring 2015–2018)
- Diego Soria – bass (2025–present; touring 2018)

=== Former ===
- Scott Miller – lead guitar, vocals (1996–1997)
- Gabe Serbian – drums, percussion (1996–2001), lead guitar (1997–2001) (died 2022)
- Dave Astor – bass (1996–2001), drums, percussion (1997–2003)
- Troy Oftedal – bass, piano (2001–2009)
- Michael Laughlin – drums, percussion (2003–2006, 2007)
- Derek Engemann – bass, keyboards (2010–2017)
- Olivier Pinard – bass (2018–2025)

== Discography ==
Cattle Decapitation discography
- Studio albums: 8
- Extended plays: 4
- Music videos: 8
- Split albums: 1
- Demos: 1

=== Studio albums ===
List of studio albums, with selected chart positions
Year	Album details	Peak chart positions				
Year	Album details	US Heat.	US Indie.	US Hard Rock	US Billboard 200	GER
2002	To Serve Man: Released: July 30, 2002; Label: Metal Blade	—	—	—	—	—
2004	Humanure: Released: July 13, 2004; Label: Metal Blade	—	—	—	—	—
2006	Karma.Bloody.Karma: Released: July 11, 2006; Label: Metal Blade	—	—	—	—	—
2009	The Harvest Floor: Released: January 20, 2009; Label: Metal Blade	16	—	—	—	—
2012	Monolith of Inhumanity: Released: May 8, 2012; Label: Metal Blade	6	32	18	—	—
2015	The Anthropocene Extinction: Released: August 7, 2015; Label: Metal Blade	—	5	5	100	88
2019	Death Atlas: Released: November 29, 2019; Label: Metal Blade	—	—	3	116	56
2023	Terrasite: Released: May 12, 2023; Label: Metal Blade	—	48	17	—	34
"—" denotes a recording that did not chart.

=== Compilation albums ===
- Medium Rarities (2018)

=== Box sets ===
Year	Album details
2014	Decade of Decapitation: Released: 2014; Label: Metal Blade; Contains: To Serve Man, Humanure, Karma.Bloody.Karma, The Harvest Floor, Monolith of Inhumanity

=== EPs ===
Year	Album details
1999	Human Jerky: Released: 1999; Label: Satans Pimp, Three One G (reissue), Accident Prone (reissue)
2000	Homovore: Released: May 2, 2000; Label: Three One G
2000	¡Decapitacion!: Released: 2000; Label: Accident Prone

=== Split albums ===
Year	Album details
1999	The Science of Crisis (with Armatron and Tic War 1): Released: 1999; Label: ToYo Records
2005	Cattle Decapitation / Caninus: Released: November 24, 2005; Label: War Torn Records

=== Demos ===
Year	Album details
1996	Ten Torments of the Damned: Released: 1996; Label: independent

=== Music videos ===
List of music videos, showing year released and director
Year	Title	Album	Director(s)
2002	"To Serve Man"	To Serve Man	Russ Herpich
2004	"Reduced to Paste"	Humanure	—N/a
2009	"Regret and the Grave"	The Harvest Floor	Gary Smithson
2009	"A Body Farm"	The Harvest Floor	—N/a
2012	"Kingdom of Tyrants"	Monolith of Inhumanity	Mitch Massie
2012	"Forced Gender Reassignment"	Monolith of Inhumanity	Mitch Massie
2013	"Your Disposal"	Monolith of Inhumanity	Mitch Massie
2016	"Clandestine Ways (Krokodil Rot)"	The Anthropocene Extinction	Mitch Massie
2017	"The Prophets of Loss"	The Anthropocene Extinction	Paul McGuire
2020	"Bring Back the Plague"	Death Atlas	—N/a
2021	"Finish Them"	Death Atlas	Nicholas Vidler
2023	"We Eat Our Young"	Terrasite	David Brodsky
2023	"Scourge of the Offspring"	Terrasite	David Brodsky
2023	"A Photic Doom"	Terrasite	David Brodsky
2023	"Solastalgia"	Terrasite	David Brodsky
