= Luck of the Corpse =

Studio album by Deceased
- Released: December 1991
- Recorded: Winter 1990 – 1991
- Studio: Oz Studios, Baltimore
- Genre: Death metal; thrash metal
- Length: 36:38
- Label: Relapse Records
- Producer: Deceased and Frank Marchand

Deceased chronology
Gut Wrench (1991)	Luck of the Corpse (1991)	13 Frightened Souls (1993)

Professional ratings
Review scores
Source	Rating
AllMusic	3/5 stars
Rock Hard	4.5/10

Luck of the Corpse is the first album by the American death/thrash band Deceased. The cover is an image from the 1963 film Black Sabbath.

== Track listing ==
No.	Title	Length
1.	"Fading Survival"	2:59
2.	"The Cemetery's Full"	3:03
3.	"Experimenting with Failure"	2:25
4.	"Futuristic Doom"	3:20
5.	"Haunted Cerebellum"	2:55
6.	"Decrepit Coma"	3:07
7.	"Shrieks from the Hearse"	3:24
8.	"Psychedelic Warriors"	5:15
9.	"Feasting on Skulls"	3:39
10.	"Birth by Radiation"	4:20
11.	"Gutwrench"	1:59

== Personnel ==
- Mark Adams – guitar
- Doug Souther – guitar
- Les Snyder – bass
- King Fowley – drums, vocals

Other credits

- Mike Smith – guitar (pictured but does not play on the album)
- Frank Marchand – engineer, mixing
- Joe Scorza – photos
