= Monolith of Inhumanity =

Studio album by Cattle Decapitation
- Released: May 8, 2012
- Recorded: January–February 2012
- Studio: Flatline Audio, Westminster, Colorado
- Genre: Technical death metal, deathgrind
- Length: 43:03
- Label: Metal Blade
- Producer: Dave Otero

Cattle Decapitation chronology
The Harvest Floor (2009)	Monolith of Inhumanity (2012)	The Anthropocene Extinction (2015)

Singles from Monolith of Inhumanity
- 1. "Your Disposal" Released: 2013

Monolith of Inhumanity is the fifth studio album by American death metal band Cattle Decapitation, released on May 8, 2012. Upon its release, it was met with widespread critical acclaim praising the addition of melody into their sound.

== Promotion ==
Music videos were released for "Kingdom of Tyrants," "Forced Gender Reassignment," and "Your Disposal." A 7" single for "Your Disposal" was released in mid-2013. The B-side is "An Exposition of Insides," previously only available on the Japanese version of the album. The music video for "Forced Gender Reassignment" was written and directed by Mitch Massie. The uncensored music video, which depicts members of the Westboro Baptist Church being abducted and given sex reassignment surgery, was available for viewing on the website Bloody Disgusting with permission from the band before it was taken down.

== Reception ==
=== Critical reception ===
Professional ratings
Aggregate scores
Source	Rating
Metacritic	79/100
Review scores
Source	Rating
About.com	4.5/5 stars
AllMusic	4/5 stars
Exclaim!	favorable
Metal Forces	8/10 stars
Metal Storm	7.7/10
PopMatters	7/10 stars
Revolver	4/5 stars
Spin	7/10 stars
Sputnikmusic	3.5/5 stars

Upon its release Monolith of Inhumanity widespread acclaim from critics. On Metacritic, it has been given a score of 79/100 based on 5 reviews.

=== Public reception ===
The album also was voted the best album of 2012 by Metal Injection readers. On the MetalSucks series "The Best Metal Albums of 2012, As Chosen by Metal Musicians Themselves," Sven de Caluwé of Aborted, Richie Cavalera of Incite, David Davidson and Dan Gargiulo both of Revocation, Charles Elliott of Abysmal Dawn, Jeremy Wagner formerly of Broken Hope, John Vail formerly of Wretched, and Leon del Muerte of Murder Construct included Monolith of Inhumanity on their lists.

== Track listing ==
All lyrics are written by Travis Ryan; all music is composed by Cattle Decapitation.

No.	Title	Length
1.	"The Carbon Stampede"	3:39
2.	"Dead Set on Suicide"	3:18
3.	"A Living, Breathing Piece of Defecating Meat"	2:58
4.	"Forced Gender Reassignment"	3:54
5.	"Gristle Licker"	4:54
6.	"Projectile Ovulation"	3:31
7.	"Lifestalker"	4:15
8.	"Do Not Resuscitate"	3:18
9.	"Your Disposal"	4:47
10.	"The Monolith"	3:39
11.	"Kingdom of Tyrants"	4:50
Total length:		43:03

Japanese edition bonus track
No.	Title	Length
12.	"An Exposition of Insides"	3:36
Total length:		46:39

== Personnel ==
Writing, performance and production credits are adapted from the album liner notes.

=== Cattle Decapitation ===
- Travis Ryan – lead vocals, electronics, atmospherics, keyboards, drums on "The Monolith"
- Josh Elmore – guitars, backing vocals on "The Carbon Stampede"
- Derek Engemann – bass, additional vocals, backing vocals on "The Carbon Stampede", additional guitar and keyboard on "The Monolith"
- Dave McGraw – drums, backing vocals on "The Carbon Stampede"

=== Guest musicians ===
- Leonard Leal (Cephalic Carnage) – vocals on "A Living, Breathing Piece of Defecating Meat"
- Mike Majewski (Devourment) – vocals on "Projectile Ovulation"

=== Additional musicians ===
- Cephalic Carnage:
  - Leonard Leal – backing vocals on "The Carbon Stampede"
  - Nick Schendzielos – backing vocals on "The Carbon Stampede"
  - Steve Goldberg – backing vocals on "The Carbon Stampede"
  - Brian Hopp – backing vocals on "The Carbon Stampede"
  - John Merryman – backing vocals on "The Carbon Stampede"
  - Zac Joe – backing vocals on "The Carbon Stampede"
  - Jawsh Mullen – backing vocals on "The Carbon Stampede"
- Sean Perry – backing vocals on "The Carbon Stampede"
- John Wiese – electronics, atmospherics

=== Production ===
- Dave Otero – production, mixing, mastering
- Shane Howard – engineering

=== Artwork and design ===
- Wes Benscoter – album artwork, photo editing
- Brian Ames – album layout
- Sam Lanthrem – photography
- Matthew Zinke – photography
- Travis Ryan – art direction, concept

=== Studio ===
- Flatline Audio, Westminster, CO, US – production, mixing, mastering

== Charts ==
Chart	Peak position
US Independent Albums (Billboard)	32
US Top Hard Rock Albums (Billboard)	18
US Heatseekers Albums (Billboard)	6
