= Darkest Day of Horror =

Studio album by Mortician
- Released: April 22, 2003
- Recorded: June 2002
- Genre: Brutal death metal
- Length: 39:42
- Label: Relapse
- Producer: Roger J. Beaujard, Matthew F. Jacobson (exec.)

Mortician chronology
Domain of Death (2001)	Darkest Day of Horror (2003)	Zombie Massacre Live! (2004)

Darkest Day of Horror is the fourth studio album by American death metal band Mortician, released on April 22, 2003, by Relapse Records. The album takes its title from a slogan used to promote the 1985 film Day of the Dead, and was Mortician's final release for Relapse Records.

== Release ==
Due to the cover artwork not being completed in time, the release date for Darkest Day of Horror was postponed. The album was released in two different versions. The initial release featured a simple, black-and-white packaging devoid of any artwork, bearing the subtitle "Limited Fall 2002 US Tour Edition" on its cover. These were pressed so that the band could sell the album while on tour. The other edition was the intended release, with complete artwork and packaging.

== Track listing ==
No.	Title	Length
1.	"Audra" (Curtains)	3:46
2.	"Slowly Eaten"	0:52
3.	"The Bloodseekers"	1:19
4.	"Voodoo Curse" (The Serpent and the Rainbow)	3:14
5.	"Massacred"	1:17
6.	"Human Puzzle" (Pieces)	2:08
7.	"Chopped to Pieces"	0:45
8.	"Revenge" (I Spit on Your Grave)	1:44
9.	"Mangled"	1:23
10.	"Dead and Buried" (Dead & Buried)	2:38
11.	"Darkest Day of Horror" (Zombi 2)	2:32
12.	"Rampage"	1:17
13.	"Cannibalistic Fiends" (Frightmare)	2:06
14.	"Carving Flesh"	0:46
15.	"Ghost House" (Ghosthouse)	3:37
16.	"Vaporized"	0:26
17.	"Pledge Night of Death" (The Initiation)	2:12
18.	"Taste for Blood" (Cannibal Girls)	2:00
19.	"Disintegrated"	0:34
20.	"The Final Sacrifice" (Children of the Corn II: The Final Sacrifice)	5:06
Total length:		39:42

== Personnel ==
Mortician

- Will Rahmer - bass, vocals
- Roger J. Beaujard - guitar, drum programming

Production

- Roger Beaujard - producer, engineer
- Will Rahmer - assistant engineer
- Matthew F. Jacobson - executive producer
- Frank White - photography
- Jonathan Canady - design
- Wes Benscoter - cover art
