= Behind the Mourner's Veil =

EP by Deceased
- Released: July 24, 2001
- Recorded: March 2001
- Studio: Oblivion Studios
- Genre: Thrash metal, death metal
- Length: 28:02
- Label: Relapse Records
- Producer: Deceased and Mike Bossier

Deceased chronology
Supernatural Addiction (2000)	Behind the Mourner's Veil (2001)	Up The Tombstones!!! Live 2000 (2002)

Behind the Mourner's Veil is an EP by death metal band Deceased, released in 2001 on Relapse Records. It was their last release on the label.

== Track listing ==
1. "It's Alive" - 4:08
2. "The Mausoleum" - 4:58
3. "Zombie Attack" (Tankard cover) - 3:04
4. "Reaganomics" (D.R.I. cover) - 0:36
5. "New Age of Total Warfare" (Warfare cover) - 2:16
6. "Deathrider" (Anthrax cover) - 2:56
7. "Victims of the Masterplan" - 10:01

Originally, the record was going to include another original song, "Slow Infection", based on the Black Dahlia murder, and a cover of the Hallows Eve song "Plunging to Megadeath". The former was not included on the final cut, and the latter was replaced by a cover of Warfare's "New Age of Total Warfare".

== Songs ==
- "It's Alive!" is based on the 70s movie 'It's Alive!'
- "Victims of the Masterplan" is about the West Memphis Three and is split into five parts:

I. The Child Murders
II. Confession And Fear
III. Speculation
IV. The Masterplan
V. Forever We Must Wonder

=== Personnel ===
- King Fowley - drums, vocals
- Mark Adams - guitar
- Mike Smith - guitar
- Les Snyder - bass

Production

- Mike Bossier - engineer
- Allen Koszowski - cover art
- Mike Fisher - cover art
