= Death Atlas =

Studio album by Cattle Decapitation
- Released: November 29, 2019
- Recorded: May 2019
- Studio: Flatline Audio, Westminster, Colorado
- Genre: Technical death metal, deathgrind
- Length: 54:58
- Label: Metal Blade
- Producer: Dave Otero

Cattle Decapitation chronology
The Anthropocene Extinction (2015)	Death Atlas (2019)	Terrasite (2023)

Singles from Death Atlas
- 1. "One Day Closer to the End of the World" Released: September 5, 2019; 2. "Bring Back the Plague" Released: October 3, 2019; 3. "Death Atlas" Released: November 21, 2019; 4. "Finish Them" Released: January 19, 2021

Death Atlas is the seventh studio album by American death metal band Cattle Decapitation. It was released on November 29, 2019, via Metal Blade Records. Its release coincided with Black Friday and came more than four years after their previous studio album, 2015's The Anthropocene Extinction.

It is the band's first album to feature rhythm guitarist Belisario Dimuzio and bassist Olivier Pinard. At just under 55 minutes, it is also their longest album to date. The album debuted at number 116 on the US Billboard 200 and at number 56 in Germany.

== Background ==
Death Atlas was recorded at Denver's Flatline Audio with producer Dave Otero. Album artwork was by Wes Benscoter. Vocalist Travis Ryan comments: "We have crafted what we feel is our strongest album to date", (...) "Musically and lyrically, there is a lot of grief, anger, hate, passion, and emotion poured into this one". Prior to the album release, the band co-headlined the 2019 Summer Slaughter Tour.

The opening track "Anthropogenic: End Transmission" samples the Greetings in 55 Languages from the Voyager Golden Record.

During the production of Terrasite, vocalist Travis Ryan called Death Atlas his "favorite Cattle record to date" and referred to the album as the band's magnum opus.

== Critical reception ==
Professional ratings
Review scores
Source	Rating
AllMusic	3/5 stars
Blabbermouth.net	9/10
Consequence of Sound	10/10
Distorted Sound	9/10
Exclaim!	6/10
No Clean Singing	favorable
Metal Storm	8.1/10

Loudwire named it one of the 50 best metal albums of 2019. Decibel magazine named it the 20th best album of 2019.

== Track listing ==
No.	Title	Length
1.	"Anthropogenic: End Transmission"	2:15
2.	"The Geocide"	3:43
3.	"Be Still Our Bleeding Hearts"	3:54
4.	"Vulturous"	4:59
5.	"The Great Dying"	1:12
6.	"One Day Closer to the End of the World"	3:47
7.	"Bring Back the Plague"	4:28
8.	"Absolute Destitute"	4:35
9.	"The Great Dying II"	1:05
10.	"Finish Them"	2:55
11.	"With All Disrespect"	4:31
12.	"Time's Cruel Curtain"	5:31
13.	"The Unerasable Past"	2:50
14.	"Death Atlas"	9:14
Total length:		54:58

Bonus tracks
No.	Title	Length
15.	"In the Kingdom of the Blind, the One-Eyed Are Kings" (Dead Can Dance cover)	4:10
16.	"An Extreme Indifference to Human Life"	3:15
Total length:		62:23

== Personnel ==
=== Cattle Decapitation ===
- Travis Ryan – vocals, keyboards (track 5, 9)
- Josh Elmore – lead guitar
- Belisario Dimuzio – rhythm guitar
- Olivier Pinard – bass
- Dave McGraw – drums

=== Additional personnel ===
- Jon Fishman – narration (track 13)
- Riccardo Conforti – keyboards (track 1)
- Laure Le Prunenec – vocals (track 14)
- Tony Parker – keyboards (track 13)
- Ottone Pesante – horns (track 16)
- Melissa Lucas-Harlow – narration (track 5)

=== Production ===
- Dave Otero – production, engineering, mixing
- Wes Benscoter – artwork
- Gautier Serre – additional engineering (track 1)

== Charts ==
Chart (2019)	Peak position
Australian Digital Albums (ARIA)	10
German Albums (Offizielle Top 100)	56
Swiss Albums (Schweizer Hitparade)	97
US Billboard 200	116
US Top Hard Rock Albums (Billboard)	3
US Top Rock Albums (Billboard)	12
