= To Serve Man (album) =

Studio album by Cattle Decapitation
- Released: July 30, 2002
- Recorded: Trident Studios
- Genres: Deathgrind, grindcore
- Length: 34:59
- Label: Metal Blade
- Producer: Juan Urteaga

Cattle Decapitation chronology
¡Decapitacion! (2000)	To Serve Man (2002)	Humanure (2004)

To Serve Man is the debut studio album by American deathgrind band Cattle Decapitation, released in 2002 through Metal Blade Records. The title is a reference to the Twilight Zone episode "To Serve Man".

== Music and lyrics ==
The tracks on To Serve Man have been described as "speedy and short bursts of dissonant grindcore" that also contain elements of death metal and crust punk. The album has been noted for its raw, stripped-down sound, which has been characterized as a "monotonous belch," drawing comparisons to Cannibal Corpse. Some of the album's guitar riffs have been likened to 1980s thrash metal acts such as Sadus and Kreator. Unlike some other bands in the genre, Cattle Decapitation did not make use of vocal effects (such as pitch shifting) or downtuned guitars. The album has also been noted for its clear production, relative to other bands in the genre such as Exhumed or Impaled. According to Blabbermouth, drummer Dave Astor "pushes the speed with a frantic tightness that will remind some of the first time they heard the Sadus D.T.P. demo." Lyrically, the album uses "gore imagery" as a metaphor for the consumption of animals, drawing comparisons to Carcass. The first track, "Testicular Manslaughter", opens with an audio sample originating from a shock video of a Russian soldier being decapitated by Chechen rebels during the Second Chechen War.

== Critical reception ==
Professional ratings
Review scores
Source	Rating
AllMusic	2/5 stars
Blabbermouth.net	8/10
Chronicles of Chaos	6.5/10
Exclaim!	favorable

In a positive review, Exclaim! praised the album's raw production and omission of pitch shifting effects, calling Cattle Decapitation an "earthy, organic counterpart to some of their more unimaginative goregrinding pals." Brian O'Neill of AllMusic was not as positive, calling the band a "caricature of the grindy gore-core bands they hope to emulate", and criticizing what he perceived as the band's reliance on the genre's formula and unwillingness to innovate.

== Track listing ==
All tracks are written by David Astor, Troy Oftedal, and Travis Ryan.

No.	Title	Length
1.	"Testicular Manslaughter"	2:50
2.	"I Eat Your Skin"	1:54
3.	"Writhe in Putrescence"	3:16
4.	"Land of the Severed Meatus"	2:22
5.	"The Regurgitation of Corpses"	2:02
6.	"Everyone Deserves to Die"	2:36
7.	"To Serve Man"	3:07
8.	"Colonic Villus Biopsy Performed on the Gastro-intestinally Incapable"	2:56
9.	"Pedeadstrians"	3:26
10.	"Long-Pig Chef and the Hairless Goat"	2:09
11.	"Hypogastric Combustion by C-4 Plastique"	2:36
12.	"Deadmeal"	2:34
13.	"Chunk Blower"	3:06
Total length:		34:59

== Personnel ==
Cattle Decapitation

- Travis Ryan – vocals
- Josh Elmore – guitars
- Troy Oftedal – bass
- David Astor – drums

Production

- Juan Urteaga – engineering, mastering
- Mike Blanchard – assistant engineering
- Wes Benscoter – cover art
- Brian Ames – graphic design
- Ryan Loyko – photography
- Myke Miazio – band logo
