= Terrasite =

Studio album by Cattle Decapitation
- Released: May 12, 2023
- Genre: Technical death metal, deathgrind
- Length: 52:41
- Label: Metal Blade
- Producer: Dave Otero

Cattle Decapitation chronology
Death Atlas (2019)	Terrasite (2023)

Singles from Terrasite
- 1. "We Eat Our Young" Released: February 16, 2023; 2. "Scourge of the Offspring" Released: March 29, 2023; 3. "A Photic Doom" Released: May 12, 2023; 4. "Solastalgia" Released: October 26, 2023

Terrasite is the eighth studio album by American death metal band Cattle Decapitation. It was released on May 12, 2023, via Metal Blade Records.

== Background ==
Terrasite was recorded in Denver with producer Dave Otero. Just prior to the start of recording, Gabe Serbian, founding member of Cattle Decapitation, died. During the two-and-a-half month recording session, the band played a tribute show to Gabe in Austin, Texas. Travis Ryan left the recording studio in Denver to attend Gabe Serbian's memorial service in San Diego and got COVID-19 during transit, which delayed recording. The loss of Gabe, combined with the death of their friend Trevor Strnad from The Black Dahlia Murder sent the members of Cattle Decapitation "spiraling", and Travis Ryan described the experience as "the roughest recording session ever".

The album artwork was created by Wes Benscoter. The first single "We Eat Our Young", was released on February 16, 2023, followed by "Scourge of the Offspring" on March 29.

In May 2025, Metal Blade Records and NJV Media released the feature-length documentary From This Flesh: A Cattle Decapitation Story. The documentary was filmed during the recording sessions for Terrasite and focuses on the production of the album, as well as the history of the band.

== Reception ==
Professional ratings
Review scores
Source	Rating
Metal Injection	9.5/10
MetalSucks	4/5 stars
Blabbermouth	9/10

== Track listing ==
No.	Title	Length
1.	"Terrasitic Adaptation"	5:02
2.	"We Eat Our Young"	3:56
3.	"Scourge of the Offspring"	4:29
4.	"The Insignificants"	4:43
5.	"The Storm Upstairs"	5:28
6.	"...And the World Will Go On Without You"	4:14
7.	"A Photic Doom"	4:47
8.	"Dead End Residents"	5:09
9.	"Solastalgia"	4:57
10.	"Just Another Body"	10:16
Total length:		52:41

== Personnel ==
=== Cattle Decapitation ===
- Travis Ryan – vocals
- Josh Elmore – lead guitar
- Belisario Dimuzio – rhythm guitar
- Olivier Pinard – bass
- Dave McGraw – drums

=== Additional personnel ===
- Dis Pater (Tony Parker) – keyboards, synthesizer, percussion (tracks 1, 3 and 10)

=== Production ===
- Dave Otero – production, engineering, mixing
- Wes Benscoter – artwork

== Charts ==
Chart (2023)	Peak position
Austrian Albums (Ö3 Austria)	66
German Albums (Offizielle Top 100)	34
Swiss Albums (Schweizer Hitparade)	68
UK Rock & Metal Albums (OCC)	4
UK Independent Albums (OCC)	12
US Independent Albums (Billboard)	48
US Top Hard Rock Albums (Billboard)	17
