= Mortician (band) =

American deathgrind band

- Origin: Yonkers, New York, U.S.
- Genres: Brutal death metal; deathgrind
- Years active: 1989–present
- Labels: Relapse; Mortician; Primitive
- Members: Will Rahmer; Roger J. Beaujard; Sam Inzerra
- Past members: Matt Sicher; Matt Harshner; John McEntee; George Torres; Desmond Tolhurst; Dave Culross; Ron Kachnic
- Website: morticianrecords.com

Mortician is an American death metal band formed in Yonkers, New York, in 1989. Relapse Records has released most of their albums since their House by the Cemetery EP. The group released their latest album with their own label, Mortician Records. They have toured America and Europe several times. The band's lyrics, artwork, and samples are inspired by horror and slasher films. They play a style of death metal influenced by grindcore.

== History ==
Mortician formed in 1989. They signed with Relapse Records in 1993 and released their debut, Mortal Massacre, that same year. In 1996, they released The House by the Cemetery, followed by Hacked Up for Barbecue in 1997. The EP Zombie Apocalypse was released in 1998 and Chainsaw Dismemberment followed in 1999. The band are scheduled to play Maryland Deathfest in 2026.

== Musical style and influences ==
Steve Huey of AllMusic wrote: "Although the group's sound is extreme and inaccessible to many ears, their song intros and use of slasher-film samples demonstrate a sense of humor (albeit a morbid one), overall a rare commodity in a genre that usually thrives on a dark, threatening posture."

Mortician is influenced by other seminal death metal and grindcore acts, such as Autopsy, Impetigo, Repulsion, Terrorizer, Bolt Thrower, Slaughter, Napalm Death, Pungent Stench, and Incantation. Will Rahmer's vocal style was also influenced by Kam Lee of Massacre. Founding members were also heavily influenced by Black Sabbath, Hellhammer, and Venom.

== Band members ==
=== Current ===
- Will Rahmer – bass, vocals (1989–present)
- Roger J. Beaujard – guitars (1991–present)
- Sam Inzerra – drums (2003–present)

=== Former ===
- Matthew David "Matt" Sicher – drums (1989–1991; died 1994)
- Matthew Carl "Matt" Harshner – guitars (1989–1990)
- John McEntee – guitars (1990)
- Desmond Tolhurst – guitars (1997–1999)
- Kyle Powell – drums (1999)
- Ron Kachnic – guitars (2000–2002)

== Discography ==
=== Studio albums ===
- Hacked Up for Barbecue (1997)
- Chainsaw Dismemberment (1999)
- Domain of Death (2001)
- Darkest Day of Horror (2003)
- Re-Animated Dead Flesh (2004)

=== EPs and singles ===
- Brutally Mutilated (7" Single, 1990)
- Mortal Massacre (7" Single, 1991)
- Mortal Massacre (EP, 1993)
- House by the Cemetery (7" Single, 1994)
- House by the Cemetery (EP, 1995)
- Zombie Apocalypse (7" Single, 1998)
- Zombie Apocalypse (EP, 1998)
- Living.../... Dead (Split with Fleshgrind, 2004)

=== Demos ===
- Rehearsal 12/14/89
- Demo No. 1 1990
- Mortician / Malignancy / Deathrune / Alive (4) – Yonkers Death (CD, Ltd) (2007)

=== Compilations ===
- Gummo soundtrack ("Skin Peeler")
- Traces of Death III: Dead and Buried soundtrack ("Traces of Death")
- Straight to Hell: A Tribute to Slayer compilation ("Piece by Piece")
- Mortal Massacre
- Zombie Apocalypse/House by the Cemetery (Cass, Comp)
- Hacked Up for Barbecue/Zombie Apocalypse
- House by the Cemetery/Mortal Massacre
- Wizards of Gore: Tribute to Impetigo compilation ("Cannibal Lust") (2000, Razorback Recordings)
- Final Bloodbath Session (2002, Primitive Recordings)
- From the Casket (2016, Necroharmonic Productions)

=== Live albums ===
- Zombie Massacre Live! (2004)

=== Tribute albums ===
- Tribute to Mortician (2007)
