= Ritual Carnage =

Thrash metal band

- Origin: Tokyo, Japan; Tampa, Florida
- Genres: Thrash metal, death metal
- Years active: 1998–present
- Label: Osmose Productions
- Members: Damian Montgomery; Wataru Yamada; Eddie Van Koide; Hiroyuki Ishizawa; Naoya Hamaii

Ritual Carnage is a thrash metal band formed in 1998. All the members are Japanese except for Damian Montgomery, their American frontman and leader.

== Members ==
=== Current members ===
- Damian "Danny Carnage" Montgomery – vocals (Barbatos)
- Wataru Yamada – guitar (King's-Evil)
- Kenichi "Eddie Van" Koide – guitar (X Japan, The Wretched)
- Hiroyuki Ishizawa – bass (King's-Evil)
- Naoya Hamaii – drums

=== Former members ===
- Shigeyuki Kamazawa – guitar (Grim Force)
- Bill Jokela – guitar (Bereaved)
- Ken Kubo – guitar (Bereaved, Miscreant Invocation, Blood Shower)
- Katsuyuki Nakabayashi – guitar (Grim Force)
- Hidenori Tanaka – guitar (Tyrant)
- Masami Yamada – guitar (King's-Evil)
- Hide Ideno – bass
- Alex Amedy – drums
- Shinjiro Sawada – drums (Blood Shower)

== Discography ==
Date	Title	Label
1998	The Highest Law	Osmose Productions
2000	Every Nerve Alive	Osmose Productions
2002	The Birth of Tragedy	Osmose Productions
2005	I, Infidel	Osmose Productions
