= Mortal Massacre =

EP by Mortician
- Released: 1991
- Genre: Death metal
- Length: 59:30
- Label: Relapse Records

Mortician chronology
Mortal Massacre 7" Single (1991)	Mortal Massacre (1991)	House by the Cemetery 7" Single (1995)

Mortal Massacre is the first CD release by New York death metal band Mortician. It consists of their Brutally Mutilated 7" vinyl EP and Mortal Massacre (hence the title) 7" vinyl EP, and live tracks recorded at two separate shows.

== Original issuing ==
Originally, Mortal Massacre was issued August 1991, as a 7" vinyl EP by Relapse Records. The cover artwork was a photo of actor Angus Scrimm in his role as "The Tall Man" from the Don Coscarelli film Phantasm.

=== Track listing ===
No.	Title	Length
1.	"Intro / Mortal Massacre" (Night of the Living Dead)	6:06
2.	"Drilling for Brains"	0:52
3.	"Redrum / Outro" (The Shining)	5:27

=== Personnel ===
- Will Rahmer — Bass Guitar and Vocals
- Roger Beaujard — Guitars
- Matt Sicher — Drums
- Recorded at D-D Studios
- Roger Beaujard and Will Rahmer — Producers
- Roger Beaujard and Will Rahmer — Engineers

== CD release ==
After the 7" release went out-of-print, Relapse Records issued Mortal Massacre on CD with additional tracks.

=== Track listing ===
No.	Title	Length
1.	"Intro / Mortal Massacre" (Night of the Living Dead)	6:07
2.	"Drilling for Brains"	0:52
3.	"Redrum / Outro" (The Shining)	5:27
4.	"Intro / Mortician"	3:25
5.	"Brutally Mutilated"	0:40
6.	"Necrocannibal / Outro"	4:47
7.	"Mortal Massacre" (Live)	3:42
8.	"Brutally Mutilated" (Live)	1:25
9.	"Necrocannibal" (Live)	5:12
10.	"Drilling for Brains" (Live)	1:18
11.	"Hacked up for Barbecue" (Live)	3:04
12.	"Redrum" (Live)	3:53
13.	"Bloodcraving" (Live)	3:28
14.	"Cremated" (Live)	1:55
15.	"Mortician" (Live)	2:50
16.	"Brutally Mutilated" (Live - Different Version)	1:02
17.	"Drilling for Brains" (Live - Different Version)	1:04
18.	"Bloodcraving" (Live - Different Version)	3:23
19.	"Scum" (Live - Napalm Death Cover)	2:40
20.	"Mortician" (Live - Different Version)	3:17
Total length:		59:30

== Personnel ==
- Will Rahmer — bass guitar and vocals
- Roger J. Beaujard — guitars
- Matt Sicher — drums

== Third issuing ==
The Mortal Massacre cd has since gone out-of-print. In 2004 Relapse Records re-released the cd as part of a two-for-one package along with the House by the Cemetery cd.
