= Fearless Undead Machines =

Studio album by Deceased
- Released: July 8, 1997
- Recorded: October 1996
- Studios: Oblivion Studios, Upper Marlboro, Maryland
- Genres: Thrash metal, death metal
- Length: 68:07
- Label: Relapse Records
- Producer: Jim Barnes

Deceased chronology
The Blueprints for Madness (1995)	Fearless Undead Machines (1997)	Supernatural Addiction (2000)

Professional ratings
Review scores
Source	Rating
AllMusic	4/5 stars

Fearless Undead Machines is the third full-length album by American death metal band Deceased, released on Relapse Records in 1997.

== Track listing ==
No.	Title	Length
1.	"The Silent Creature"	8:40
2.	"Contamination"	2:13
3.	"Fearless Undead Machines"	7:50
4.	"From the Ground They Came"	2:16
5.	"Night of the Deceased"	7:53
6.	"Graphic Repulsion"	5:03
7.	"Mysterious Research"	7:59
8.	"Beyond Science"	4:55
9.	"Unhuman Drama"	5:16
10.	"The Psychic"	6:13
11.	"Destiny"	9:45

== Personnel ==
- King Fowley – drums, vocals
- Mike Smith – guitars
- Mark Adams – guitars
- Les Snyder – bass
- Mike Bossier – engineer
- Wes Benscoter – cover art
