= There Was Blood Everywhere =

Compilation album by Embalmer
- Released: June 17, 1997
- Recorded: 1993–1995
- Studio: Prime Time Studios, Akron, Ohio; Primetime Recording
- Genre: Death metal
- Length: 25:57
- Label: Relapse
- Producer: Embalmer; Bill Yurkiewicz

Embalmer chronology
| There Was Blood Everywhere (EP) (1995) | There Was Blood Everywhere (1997) | 13 Faces of Death (2006) |

Professional ratings
Review scores
| Source | Rating |
|---|---|
| Allmusic | 2.5/5 stars |

There Was Blood Everywhere is a compilation of Embalmer's "There Was Blood Everywhere" EP and four new tracks. It was released by Relapse Records in 1997. The liner notes come with full recording information (including dates and locales) and full lyrics.

== Track listing ==
Music by Embalmer. Copyright Relapse-Release Music.

1. "There Was Blood Everywhere" – 1:51
2. "The Necro-Filing Cabinet" – 2:37
3. "Blood Sucking Freaks" – 2:09
4. "May the Wounds Bleed Forever" – 3:27
5. "Rotten Body Fluids" – 2:37
6. "Bone Box" – 4:44
7. "Morbid Confessions" – 2:26
8. "The Cellar" – 5:06

== Personnel ==
- Rick Fleming – vocals
- John Jermann – guitar
- Mark Davis – guitar
- Dave Phillips – bass
- Roy Stewart – drums, percussion

== Production ==
- Embalmer – arrangement, production, recording, engineering, mixing
- Bill Yurkiewicz – production, recording, engineering, mixing
