= Wild Rags =

Wild Rags Records
- Founded: 1986
- Founder: Ricardo Campos
- Genre: Noise music Grindcore; Death Metal; Thrash Metal
- Country of origin: United States
- Location: Montebello, California

Wild Rags Records was an independent record label and store located in Montebello, California. It was founded in 1986 by Ricardo Campos, better known as Richard C. Wild Rags Records was known as "The Worlds Smallest But Heaviest Record Label." Wild Rags Records was instrumental in the early careers of such successful bands as Nuclear Death, Impetigo, Brutality, Blood, Sigh, Blasphemy, Necrophobic, Nuctemeron, Extreme Smoke, Crucifer, Internal Bleeding, and Hellwitch. Wild Rags Records also had a 30,000+ monthly subscription zine called the 'Wild Rag' full of the latest extreme metal releases, news and artwork. The zine included all the labels releases as well as product from the world's biggest metal bands. Richard C. and Wild Rags Records was a pioneer in the underground extreme metal community.

== Artist Roster ==
- Blasphemy
- Blood
- Brutality
- Crucifer
- Dying Fetus
- Emperor
- Gammacide
- Hellwitch
- Hexx
- Impetigo
- Internal Bleeding
- Nausea
- Necrophobic
- Nuclear Death
- Order From Chaos
- Sadistic Intent
- SEASON
- Sigh
- Toxodeth
- Vital Remains
- YSIGIM
- Zombified Preachers Of Gore

== Official Releases ==
- Crucifer 'Festival Of Death' 1991
- Crucifer 'Pray For The Dead' 7" 1992
- Crucifer 'Pictures Of Heaven' 1993
- Crucifer 'Separation' 1994

== Wild Rag! ==
Wild Rag! was a monthly publication that included the labels artists, interviews with the bands, underground metal news, a full music catalog, merchandise, and more. The zine was released once a month to a subscription base of over 30,000. In many ways the Wild Rag! was the bible for all things metal.

== Wild Rags Records Store ==
The physical location of the now closed record store was 2207 West Whittier Boulevard, Montebello, CA 90640.

== See also ==
- List of record labels
