= Impetigo (band) =

American goregrind band

- Origin: Bloomington, Illinois, U.S.
- Genres: Grindcore; death metal; goregrind
- Years active: 1987–1993, 2007
- Labels: Wild Rags, A Whisper in Darkness, Iron, Morbid, Razorback
- Members: Stevo; Mark; Dan; Scotty

Impetigo was an American death metal band formed in 1987. They signed with record label Wild Rags, which released their album Ultimo Mondo Cannibale in 1990.

They were one the first bands to use clips from films and other media as intros for their songs. This inspired other death metal bands, such as Mortician, to do the same.

Their lyrical themes include 1970s and '80s splatter films, cannibal films, mutilation and gore.

== History ==
In 2010, they released the DVD Defiling the Stage, which includes four live performances, one from 1987, two from 1990 and a reunion show from 2007.

In 2003, Razorback Records released Wizards of Gore, an Impetigo tribute album, featuring Blood Duster, Mortician, Machetazo, Impaled, Haemorrhage, Exhumed, Cock and Ball Torture, Lymphatic Phlegm, Last Days of Humanity, Gore Beyond Necropsy, Lord Gore, and more. Razorback Records also released the "ultimate" reissues of the Ultimo Mondo Cannibale and Horror of the Zombies albums, which include the original artwork, liner notes by bassist/vocalist Stevo Dobbins, and bonus tracks.

Guitarist Mark Sawickis died on February 15, 2026.

== Band members ==
- Stevo Dobbins – vocals, bass
- Mark Sawickis – guitar (died 2026)
- Dan Malin – drums
- Scotty Bross – guitar

== Original discography ==
- All We Need Is Cheez (1987, live demo)
- Giallo (1989, demo)
- Ultimo Mondo Cannibale (1990)
- Antefatto (1991, split 7-inch EP with Blood)
- Buio Omega (1991, 7-inch EP)
- Faceless (1991, 7-inch EP)
- Horror of the Zombies (1992)
- Primitives (1999, split 7-inch EP with Transgressor)
- Late Night Necrophiliac Fun (1999, split mCD with Ingrowing)
- Live Total Zombie Gore Holocaust (2008, Live)
- Defiling The Stage (2010, DVD)

== Re-releases ==
- Giallo (1999, 10-inch picture disc)
- All We Need Is Cheez (1999)
- Ultimo Mondo Cannibale (1999, 12-inch picture disc)
- Faceless (2000, mCD/7" EP)
- Buio Omega (2000, mCD/CD-ROM)
- Giallo/Antefatto (2000)
- Horror of the Zombies (2001, picture disc LP)
- Ultimo Mondo Cannibale "Ultimate Edition" (2006)
- Horror of the Zombies "Ultimate Edition" (2007)
