= Embalmer (band) =

American death metal band

Embalmer is an American death metal band from Cleveland, Ohio.

== Formation and early releases (1989–1992) ==
In 1989, Toby Wulff (bass/vocals), Roy Stewart (drums), and Mark Davis (guitar) formed the band as Corpsegrinder. They released their first demo, Into The Oven, independently in 1991. At that time, they changed their name to Embalmer. At the end of the recording of the demo, Scott Cunningham stepped in to play second guitar but was replaced with Duane Morris. Wulff and Morris departed in late 1992

== "Rotting Remains" to hiatus (1993–1997) ==
In 1993, the band independently released the Rotting Remains demo, with Stewart and Davis of the original group plus Rick Fleming (vocals), Brian Holmberg (bass), and Jocko Jermann (guitar). In 1994, the demo caught the attention of Relapse Records. They began distributing it through their catalog. In late 1994, Holmberg left the band, first replaced with the returning Wulff, and later with Dave Phillips. In 1995, the band released the four-track, 7-inch vinyl There Was Blood Everywhere EP through Relapse. Two years later, they released a compilation album under the same name, which re-released Rotting Remains and There Was Blood Everywhere on one CD. In 1996, Dave Phillips left and Greg Jucuum replaced him. In late 1997, Rick Fleming left and was replaced with Frank Walls. Shortly after, the band went on hiatus for eight years.

== Reformation and new album (2005–2007) ==
Embalmer reformed in 2005 and began work on new material. The band consisted of Stewart, Fleming, Davis, Jermann, and Rob Lesniak. In early 2006, Davis and Jermann left the band, leading to Don Wolff (lead guitar) joining the band, and eventually the return of Morris. In 2007, they played several shows. Their album 13 Faces Of Death was released on October 13, 2006, through Potatohead Productions.

== Tours, momentum and a new era (2013–present) ==
In 2012, vocalist Rick Fleming was fired from the band. Brian Baxter recruited Paul Gorefiend to fill the vocal slot. Joe Wunderle joined on bass. This lineup went on the band's first tours of the United States. The band released the album Emanations from the Crypt on April 1, 2016, through Hells Headbangers Records.

In 2019, the band released a live in the studio album, Embalmed Alive.

As of January 2022, Embalmer's third album, Pathways to Putrefaction, was in the final stages of recording and would be released later in 2022. The band was set to perform a handful of shows throughout 2022 with bands joining on varied dates such as Nunslaughter, Fully Consumed, Ignominous, and more.

== Band members ==
=== Current lineup ===
- John Doe - vocals (2012–present)
- Roy Stewart - drums (1989–1997, 2005–2007, 2011–present)
- Dave Almendinger - bass (2020–present)
- Brian Baxter - lead guitar (2011–present)
- Aaron Gall - guitar (2024)

=== Former members ===
- Toby Wulff - vocals/bass (1989–1992, 1995)
- Joe Wunderle - bass (2012–2019)
- Brian Baxter - lead guitar (2008–2015)
- Dylan Gordon - guitar (2013–2014)
- Rick Fleming - vocals (1993–1997, 2005–2012)
- Frank Walls - vocals (1997)
- Mark Davis - guitar (1989–1997, 2005–2006)
- Jocko Jermann - guitar (1993–1997, 2005–2006)
- Duane Morris - guitar (1991–1992, 2006–2008)
- Scott Cunningham - guitar (1991)
- Dave Phillips - bass (1995)
- Greg Jucuum - bass (1996–1997)
- Brian Holmberg - bass (1993–1994)
- Daron Schmidt - bass (2009)
- Lou Spencer - bass (2010–2012)
- Tim Powell - drums (2007–2010)
- Lee Andrews - drums (2007)
- Don Wolff - lead guitar (2006–2009, 2015–2021)
- Tim Looney - guitar (2022)
- Matthew Brown - guitar (2023)

== Discography ==
=== Demos and EPs ===
- Into The Oven - (Demo 1991)
- Taxidermist - (Live Demo 1992)
- Rotting Remains - (Demo 1993)
- There Was Blood Everywhere - (7-inch EP 1995/Compilation CD 1997 "Relapse Underground Series")
- Promo 2009
- Promo 2012
- Promo 2013
- "Emanations From the Crypt" track on Hell's Headbash 2 compilation album (2015)

=== Other releases ===
- There Was Blood Everywhere (Compilation) 1997
- 13 Faces of Death 2006
- Collection Of Carnage 2012
- Emanations From The Crypt 2016
