= House by the Cemetery (EP) =

EP by Mortician
- Released: August 22, 1995
- Genre: Death metal
- Length: 24:50
- Label: Relapse Records

Mortician chronology
House by the Cemetery (7" single) (1994)	House by the Cemetery (1995)	Hacked Up for Barbecue (1997)

House by the Cemetery is an EP by American death metal band Mortician. The album is named after cult director Lucio Fulci's 1981 horror film The House by the Cemetery. The album features samples from various horror movies.

== Track listing ==
=== Original release ===
Originally, Relapse Records released House by the Cemetery only as a 7" EP on September 16, 1994. It was pressed on black vinyl, but there was a limited pressing (200 copies) on silver vinyl. The vinyl version contained the following tracks:

No.	Title	Length
1.	"Intro / Defiler of the Dead"
2.	"Barbaric Cruelties"
3.	"World Domination" (a misprint, as the track is "World Damnation")
4.	"Driller Killer"
5.	"House by the Cemetery / Outro"

House by the Cemetery was later released as a CD, which contains the track listing stated below.

=== CD release ===
No.	Title	Length
1.	"Intro / Defiler of the Dead" (Deranged (1974))	2:51
2.	"Barbaric Cruelties"	0:53
3.	"World Domination" (Cyborg (1989))	2:45
4.	"Driller Killer" (The Driller Killer (1979))	1:59
5.	"House by the Cemetery / Outro" (The House by the Cemetery (1981))	2:53
6.	"Procreation (Of the Wicked)" (Celtic Frost cover)	4:02
7.	"Scum" (Napalm Death cover)	2:23
8.	"Intro / Gateway to Beyond" (The Beyond (1981))	2:00
9.	"Flesh Eaters" (Cannibal Apocalypse)	1:40
10.	"Noturam Demondo / Outro" (The Evil Dead (1981))	2:48
Total length:		24:50

The title for track 3, "World Domination", is a misprint on the CD's back cover, as the title listed in the lyric sheet is "World Damnation". This becomes more evident with the final line in the lyrics — "Damnation of the earth".

== Later release ==
Now out-of-print, House by the Cemetery has been re-released as a two-for-one package. This newer edition includes the tracks found on the House by the Cemetery CD, as well as the tracks found on the Mortal Massacre CD.
