= Deathgrind =

Fusion genre of death metal and grindcore

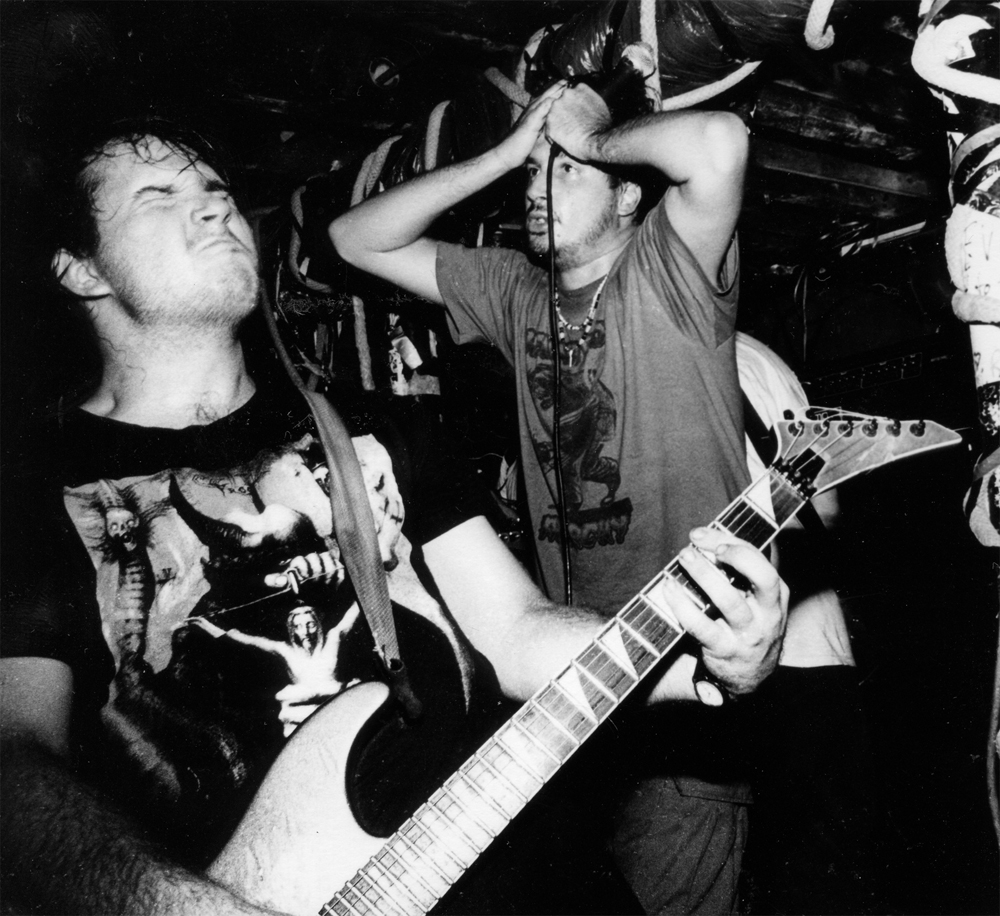
- Deathgrind pioneers Assück performing in the early 1990s
- Stylistic origins: Death metal; grindcore
- Cultural origins: Late 1980s-1990s, United States and United Kingdom

Other topics
- Extreme metal; goregrind; pornogrind

Deathgrind (sometimes written as death-grind or death/grind) is a shorthand term that is used to describe bands who play a fusion of death metal and grindcore.

Zero Tolerance described deathgrind as "grindcore and brutal death metal colliding head on." Dan Lilker described deathgrind as "combining the technicality of death metal with the intensity of grindcore." Paul Schwarz in a 2006 Terrorizer article explained the origin of the term as arising from specialist catalogs and zines within the extreme metal scene in the 1990s:

"Like death/thrash and death/black, the name death/grind undoubtedly stems from the importance of specialist mail order catalogues and their related 'zine scenes in proliferating extreme metal music to an audience whose tastes, as the '90s progressed, increasingly crossed over the traditional line between death metal and grindcore - that of lyrical content. [Death/grind e]mphasis[es] overall musical brutality with a specific focus on speed-soaked fury and the firm retention of grindcore's traditional abruptness."

== See also ==
- List of deathgrind bands
- Goregrind
- Pornogrind
