= List of Incantation (American band) members =

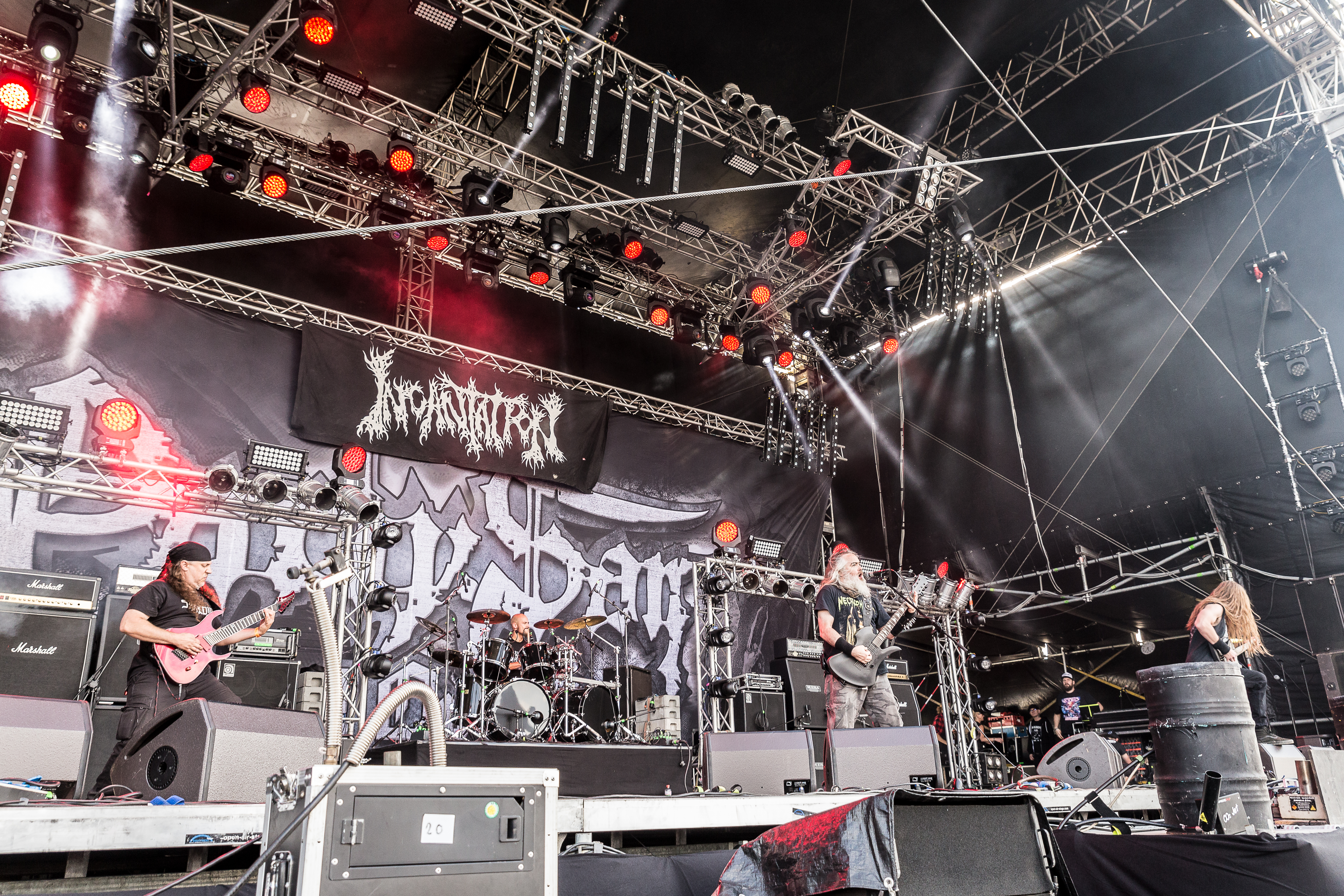
Incantation performing live in 2019.

Incantation is an American death metal band from Fairlawn, New Jersey. Formed in 1989, the group's original lineup consisted of vocalist and drummer Paul Ledney, lead guitarist John McEntee, rhythm guitarist Brett Makowski, and bassist Aragon Amori. The only remaining original member is McEntee, who has also been the band's vocalist since 2003. The current lineup also features drummer Kyle Severn (who first joined in 1994), bassist Chuck Sherwood (since 2008) and guitarist Luke Shively (since 2020).

== History ==
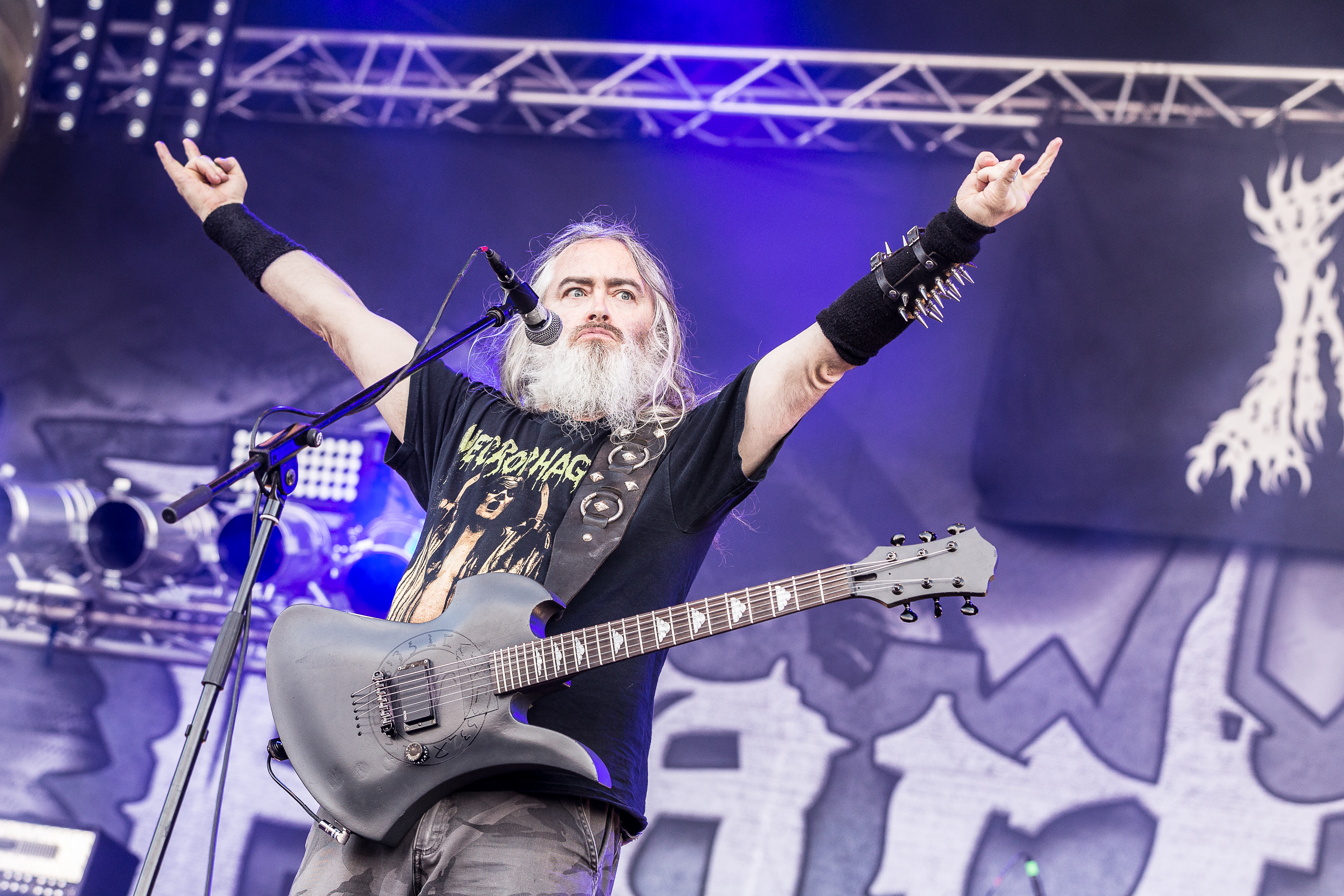
John McEntee is the sole constant member of Incantation.

=== 1989–1995 ===
Incantation was formed in August 1989. The original lineup included former Revenant drummer Paul Ledney (who also performed vocals) and guitarist John McEntee, plus former Blood Thirsty Death guitarist Brett Makowski and bassist Aragon Amori. Shortly after recording a rehearsal demo in January 1990, all but McEntee left the band to form the black metal group Profanatica. By March, McEntee had built a new lineup featuring guitarist Sal Seijo, bassist Ronnie Deo, drummer Peter Barnevic, and temporary vocalist Will Rahmer, who joined in return for McEntee filling in on guitar for Mortician. This lineup recorded another demo, plus the EP Entrantment of Evil, before Seijo and Barnevic were replaced in August by Bill Venner and Jim Roe, respectively; Venner left after just a couple of months, with the band playing a show in October as a four-piece.

In November 1990, Craig Pillard was brought in to replace Venner, as well as taking over vocals from the temporary Rahmer. With the new lineup, Incantation released Deliverance of Horrific Prophecies in 1991, followed by their full-length debut Onward to Golgotha in 1992. Deo left in December 1992 after the band's first North American headlining tour, with Dan Kamp taking his place. The new lineup recorded just one song, "Emaciated Holy Figure", which was released on a Relapse Records compilation, before both Roe (for "personal reasons") and Kamp left the band in August 1993. By November, the pair had been replaced by new bassist Dave Niedrist and drummer John Brody, although for recording of the band's second album Mortal Throne of Nazarene in early 1994, Roe filled in on drums, with Brody tasked with preparing for an upcoming tour.

Partway through a tour in July 1994, Pillard decided to leave Incantation; he was temporarily replaced by the band's merchandise salesman Duane Morris, who remained in the position after the tour, when he and McEntee relocated to Cleveland, Ohio. After the move, Morris and McEntee added new bassist Randy Scott and drummer Kyle Severn, although Scott suddenly left just a few days before a tour in October, forcing the remaining trio to play the shows without a bassist. Scott was replaced at the beginning of 1995 by Mike Donnelly, who debuted on a Mexican tour; partway through a run of North American shows in the summer, Morris suddenly left the band, with Daniel Corchado brought in to take his place for the rest of the dates.

=== 1995–2001 ===
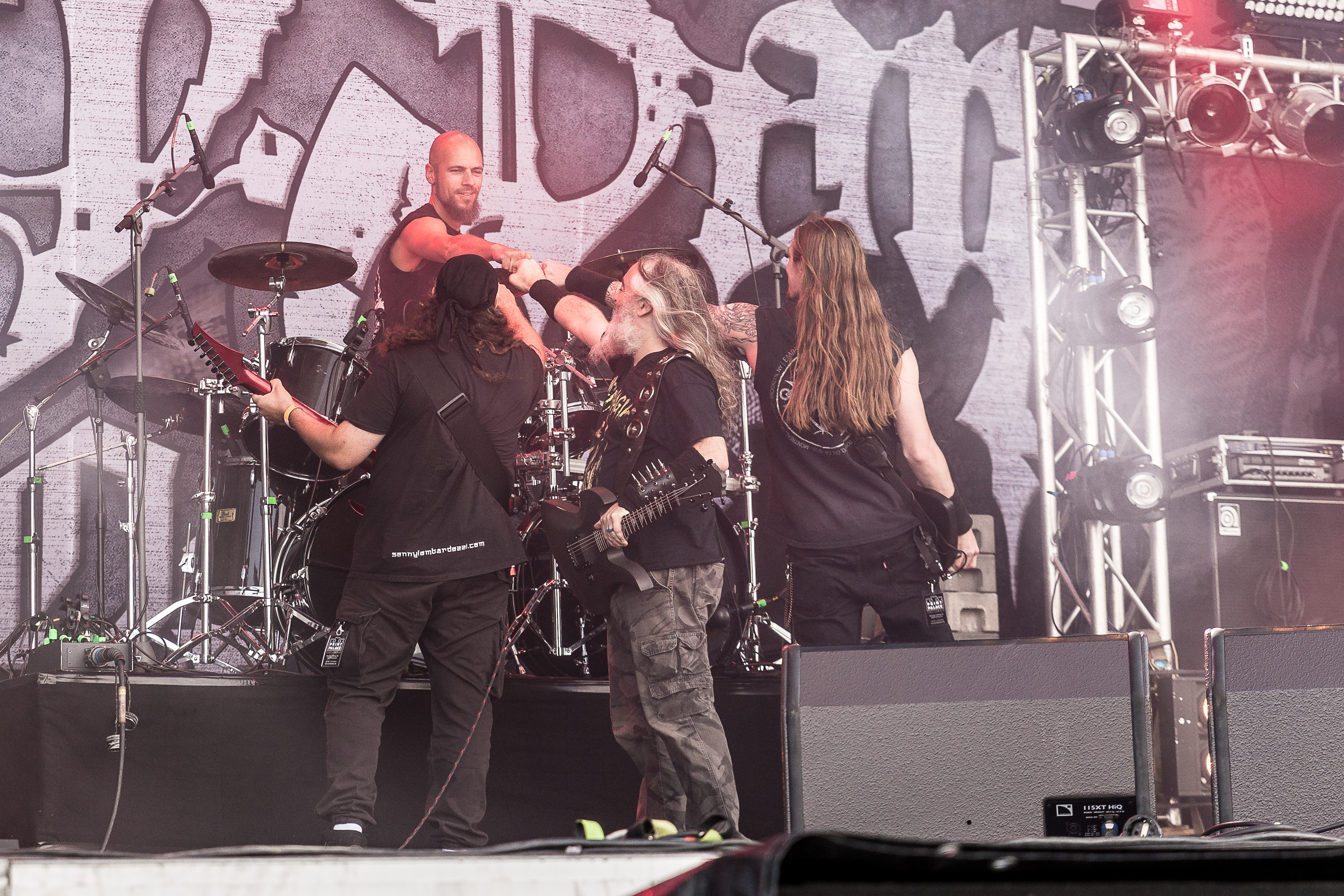
Kyle Severn has been Incantation's drummer since 1994, save for two short breaks.

After the end of a tour in August 1995, Corchado returned to his native Mexico and Donnelly left Incantation; McEntee and Severn subsequently recorded a promo demo in early 1996 with former vocalist Will Rahmer, Deathrune guitarist Mike Saez and Prime Evil bassist Mary Ciullo, before touring with vocalist/guitarist Nathan Rossi, bassist Kevin Hughes and Saez. During early 1997, McEntee and Severn recorded The Forsaken Mourning of Angelic Anguish with Hughes and former vocalist Craig Pillard, Tribute to the Goat with Hughes, Pillard and Saez, and bonus tracks for a reissue of The Forsaken Mourning of Angelic Anguish with Pillard and Daniel Corchado on bass. Corchado took over vocals for a tour in the spring/summer, which also featured Saez on guitar, before the band saw out 1997 touring and recording Diabolical Conquest as a trio without a second guitarist.

Before the end of 1997, Rob Yench took over on bass and Corchado switched back to guitar. In June 1998, Corchado left to focus on The Chasm, with Tom Stevens — a former bandmate of Yench's in Morpheus Descends — taking his place for the rest of the current tour, becoming a full-time member after the shows. For a run of Canadian shows in July, Kyle Severn was unable to enter the country, so Soulless drummer Chris Dora temporarily stood in. Severn finished the tour in August, before choosing to leave the band for "numerous reasons that were completely non band related". He was replaced in October by Clay Lytle, who played one show in November before leaving again. At the end of 1998, McEntee again relocated Incantation, this time to Johnstown, Pennsylvania, where he added Rick "Slim" Boast to the band's lineup for tour dates in January and February 1999. For a festival appearance in March, Dora once again filled in on drums. Mark Perry took over for US and Canadian dates during April and May.

Tom Stevens left the band in July 1999, with Mike Saez taking over for a pair of shows in Argentina which also featured Dora on drums; Saez became an official member again after the tour. At the end of the year, Saez, McEntee and Yench recorded The Infernal Storm with Malevolent Creation drummer Dave Culross. Prior to the album's release, Death drummer Richard Christy was enlisted as the band's new touring drummer. By August 2000, Kyle Severn had returned to Incantation's lineup.

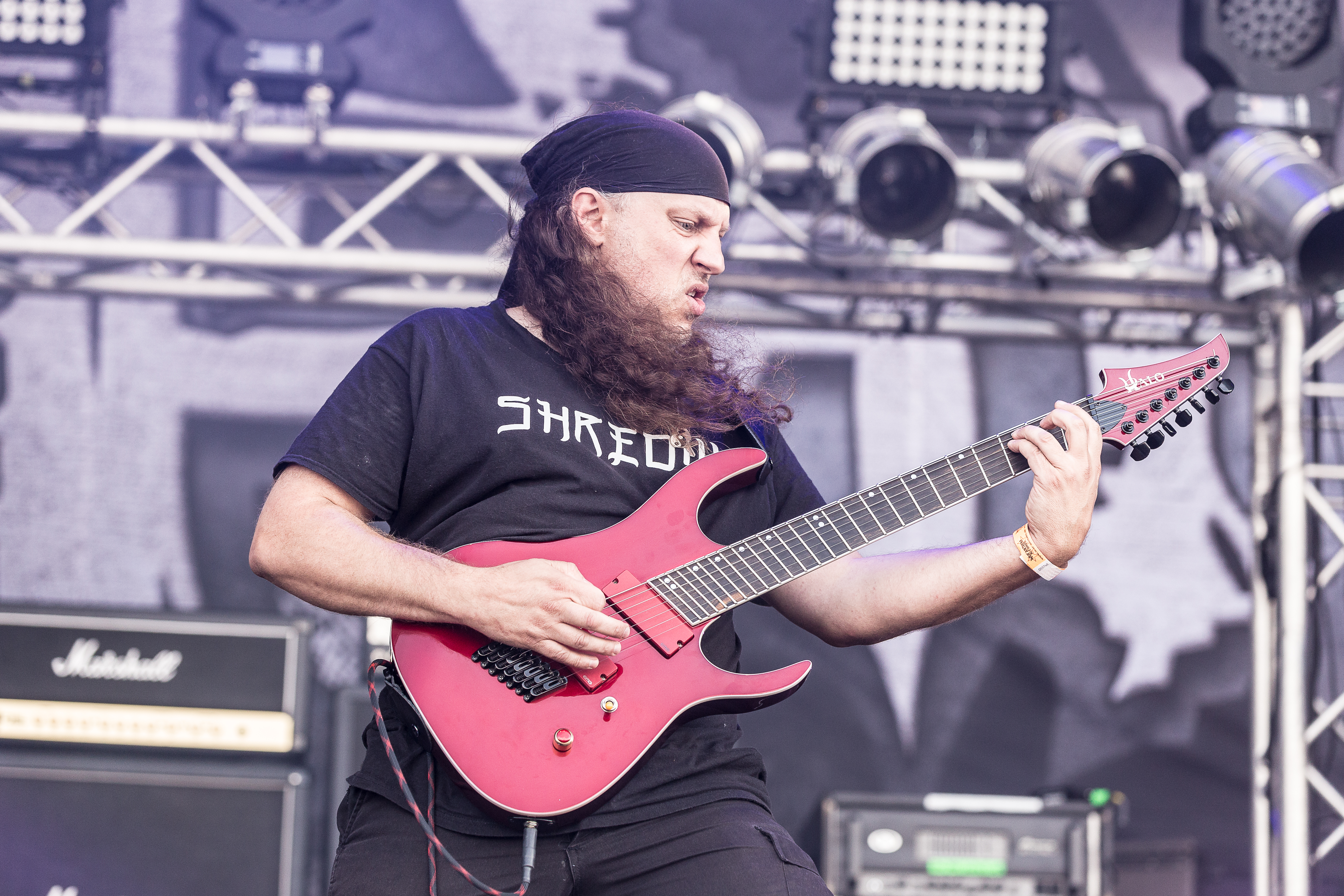
After John McEntee took over vocal duties in 2003, Sonny Lombardozzi joined as touring lead guitarist. He later rejoined as an official member in 2014.

=== 2001–2007 ===
After a Brazilian tour in May 2001 which spawned a live album, Yench left the band after claiming he was "losing interest". He was replaced by Joe Lombard, who was initially described as "a stand-by replacement". After recording the band's next album Blasphemy, Saez left Incantation in the fall of 2001, with the band enlisting temporary stand-ins Belial Koblak and later Vincent Crowley for 2002 tour dates. At the beginning of 2003, the band played a handful of gigs in Mexico, at which guitarist John McEntee also provided vocals; he subsequently decided to take on the role, with the band officially becoming a trio. At the same time, the group announced the addition of guitarist Lou "Sonny" Lombardozzi as a touring member. During that year's summer tour, Psycroptic's David Haley was forced to fill in for Severn at one show after he injured his wrist.

Lombardozzi was replaced by Thomas Pioli for a run of shows in Brazil in November and Chile in December. However, when the Chile dates were cancelled, the band also announced that Pioli had been fired, calling him a "loser piece of shit", "the most inconsiderate, unappreciative, disrespectful, disgrace of human life Incantation has ever worked with", and a "pill popping, stupid, mental case fucking douche bag". The official trio of McEntee, Lombard and Severn recorded Decimate Christendom in March 2004, which was released in August. For tour dates near the end of the year, Ilmar Uibo stood in for Severn, following his mother's death. During 2005, Roberto Lizárraga stood in for Joe Lombard on bass at several shows due to "family matters". He later returned for shows in Mexico in February 2006, then again in Spain in July that year.

Later in 2006, after recording Primordial Domination, bassist Joe Lombard left Incantation; he later died on January 3, 2012. For shows in February and March 2007, bass was handled by Tomasz "Reyash" Rejek, while former drummer Jim Roe stood in for Severn, who had other commitments. Alex Bouks replaced Rejek for a show in May, before Lizárraga returned in June. For a European tour in the fall, McEntee was joined by Rejek on bass and Craig Smilowski on drums.

=== 2007–2019 ===
At the end of 2007, it was announced that Incantation would be touring with a special lineup early the next year, with McEntee joined by recent touring members Jim Roe (drums) and Alex Bouks (now on guitar), plus former frontman Craig Pillard on vocals. Reyash was initially slated to remain on bass, however by early the next year, Chuck Sherwood had taken his place. Pillard featured at most shows during the spring and summer of 2008, which featured a set centred entirely around the band's first three albums, while other shows were fronted by McEntee and featured material from the band's whole career (four of these shows, in Mexico, featured former touring bassist Roberto Lizárraga). Shows continued until August, when McEntee cancelled remaining shows due to "personal family issues".

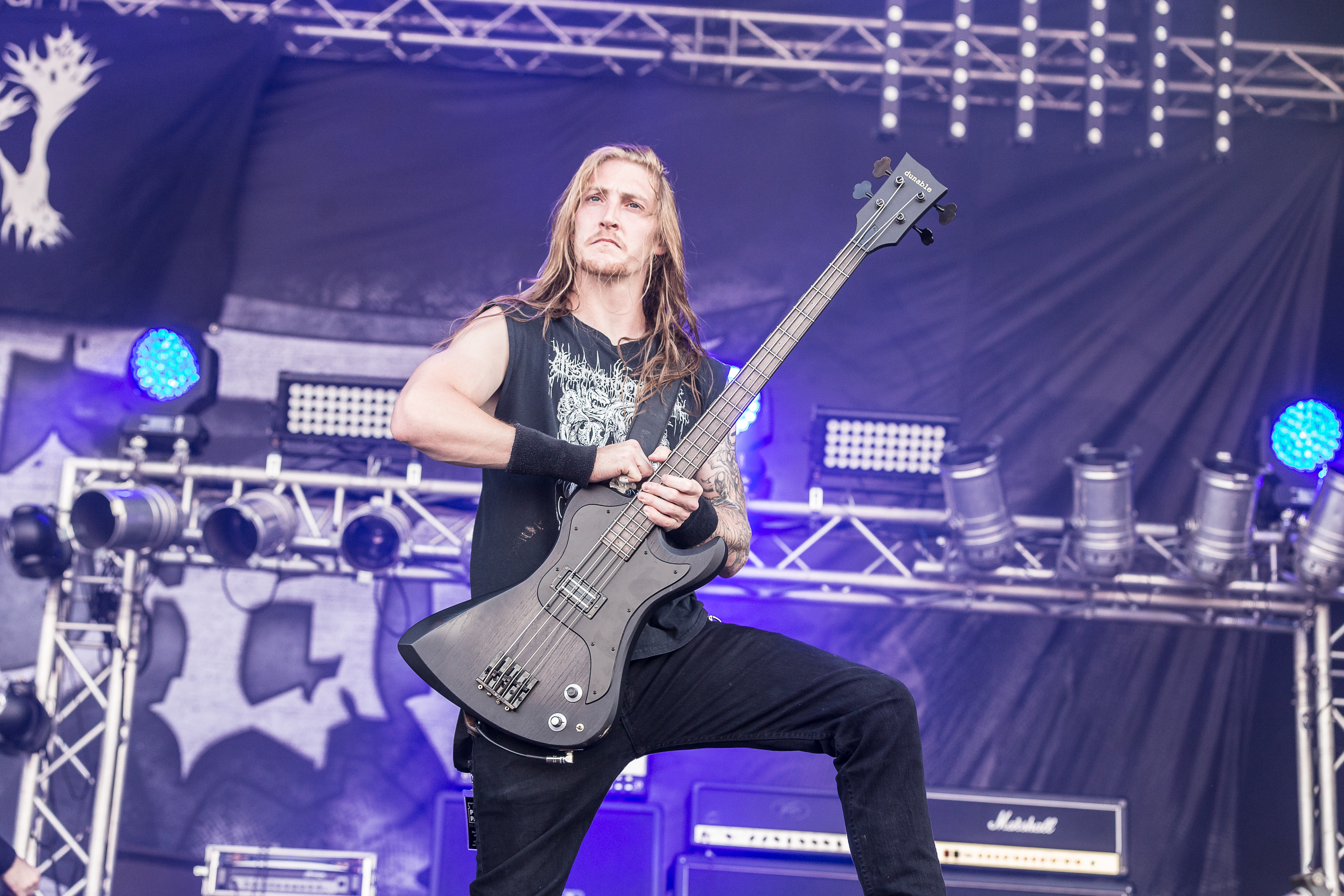
Luke Shively was Incantation's touring bassist between 2015 and 2019, before replacing Lombardozzi on lead guitar.

After initially serving as touring-only members, Bouks and Sherwood became official members of Incantation during 2009, when Kyle Severn also returned on drums. Two of the band's shows in October that year featured Lizárraga on bass. Incantation's lineup remained stable for the next few years, and in 2012 the band released its first new material in six years, the single "Degeneration" and the album Vanquish in Vengeance. Prior to the album's release, Sam Inzerra of Mortician and Funerus filled in for Severn on several tour dates. The band released Dirges of Elysium in 2014, which was the last album to feature Bouks before he was dismissed in March that year, after a "few years" of reported "rough waters". He was replaced by former touring guitarist Lou "Sonny" Lombardozzi. Starting in 2015, Sherwood was replaced on tour by Luke Shively.

The new lineup released Profane Nexus in August 2017. Touring drummers continued to be utilised over the next few years when Severn was unavailable, including Jason Longo during 2017, James Coppolino in 2018, and Frank Schilperoort at several points between 2018 and 2020. In 2020, the band released its eleventh album Sect of Vile Divinities — the last to feature Lombardozzi, who was replaced by Shively in late-December 2019, after recording for the album had finished.

=== Since 2019 ===
Since Luke Shively switched from touring bassist to full-time guitarist, Incantation has enlisted several musicians in recent years to fill in for Chuck Sherwood, who is unable to tour due to commitments at another job. Temporary touring bassists have included Scott Pivarnick in 2022, Dan Vadim Von in 2022 and 2023, Brian Rush in late 2023, Julian Guillen in 2024, and Soikot Sengupta in 2025. Charles Koryn stood in for Kyle Severn during a tour in 2023. The band's official lineup of McEntee, Shively, Sherwood and Severn released a split EP in 2022 with German band Blood, followed by the album Unholy Deification in August 2023.

== Members ==
=== Current ===
Image	Name	Years active	Instruments	Release contributions
	John McEntee	1989–present	lead and rhythm guitars; vocals (since early 2003)	all Incantation releases
	Kyle Severn	1994–1998; 2000–2007; 2009–present	drums	all Incantation releases from Promo 1996 (1996) onwards, except The Infernal Storm (2000) and Blasphemous Creation (2008)
	Chuck Sherwood	2008–present	bass	all Incantation releases from "Absolved in Blood" (2011) onwards
	Luke Shively	2015–present (touring member until late 2019)	lead and rhythm guitars; bass (as touring member)	Split with Blood (2022); Unholy Deification (2023)

=== Former ===
Image	Name	Years active	Instruments	Release contributions
	Paul Ledney	1989–1990	vocals; drums	Reh 1.3.90 demo (1990)
	Brett Makowski	1989–1990	rhythm guitar	Reh 1.3.90 demo (1990)
	Aragon Amori	1989–1990 (died 1996)	bass	Reh 1.3.90 demo (1990)
	Ronnie Deo	1990–1992 (died 2022)	bass	Demo #1 (1990); Entrantment of Evil (1990); Deliverance of Horrific Prophecies (1991); Onward to Golgotha (1992); Blasphemous Cremation (2008)
	Will Rahmer	1990 (stand-in); 1995–1996	vocals	Demo #1 (1990); Entrantment of Evil (1990); Promo 1996 (1996)
	Sal Seijo	1990	rhythm guitar	Demo #1 (1990); Entrantment of Evil (1990)
	Peter Barnevic	1990	drums	Demo #1 (1990); Entrantment of Evil (1990)
	Jim Roe	1990–1993; 1994 (session); 2007 (touring); 2008 (touring)	drums	Deliverance of Horrific Prophecies (1991); Onward to Golgotha (1992); "Emaciated Holy Figure" (1993); Mortal Throne of Nazarene (1994); Upon the Throne of Apocalypse (1995); Blasphemous Cremation (2008)
	Bill Venner	1990	rhythm guitar	none
	Craig Pillard	1990–1994; 1997 (session); 2008 (touring)	vocals; rhythm guitar	Deliverance of Horrific Prophecies (1991); Onward to Golgotha (1992); "Emaciated Holy Figure" (1993); Mortal Throne of Nazarene (1994); Upon the Throne of Apocalypse (1995); The Forsaken Mourning of Angelic Anguish (1997); Tribute to the Goat (1997); Blasphemous Cremation (2008)
	Dan Kamp	1992–1993	bass	"Emaciated Holy Figure" (1993)
	Dave Niedrist	1993–1994	bass	Mortal Throne of Nazarene (1994); Upon the Throne of Apocalypse (1995)
	John Brody	1993–1994	drums	none
	Duane Morris	1994–1995	vocals; rhythm guitar	none
	Randy Scott	1994	bass	none
	Mike Donnelly	1995	bass	none
	Daniel Corchado	1995 (touring); 1997–1998	vocals; rhythm guitar; bass (1997–1998)	Diabolical Conquest (1998)
	Mike Saez	1995–1996; 1997 (session, later touring); 1999–2001	rhythm guitar; vocals (1999–2001)	Promo 1996 (1996); Tribute to the Goat (1997); The Infernal Storm (2000); Live: Blasphemy in Brazil Tour 2001 (2001); Blasphemy (2002)
	Mary Ciullo	1995–1996	bass	Promo 1996 (1996)
	Kevin Hughes	1996–1997	bass	The Forsaken Mourning of Angelic Anguish (1997); Tribute to the Goat (1997)
	Nathan Rossi	1996 (died 2024)	vocals; rhythm guitar	none
	Rob Yench	1997–2001	bass	The Infernal Storm (2000); Live: Blasphemy in Brazil Tour 2001 (2001)
	Tom Stevens	1998–1999	vocals; rhythm guitar	none
	Clay Lytle	1998	drums	none
	Rick "Slim" Boast	1999	drums	none
	Joe "Fingers" Lombard	2001–2006 (died 2012)	bass	Blasphemy (2002); Decimate Christendom (2004); "Thieves of the Cloth" (2006); Primordial Domination (2006); "Scapegoat" (2010)
	Lou "Sonny" Lombardozzi	2003 (touring); 2014–2019	lead and rhythm guitars	XXV (2016); Profane Nexus (2017); Sect of Vile Divinities (2020)
	Alex Bouks	2007 (touring); 2008–2014	lead and rhythm guitars; bass (2007)	"Absolved in Blood" (2011); "Degeneration" (2012); Vanquish in Vengeance (2014); Dirges of Elysium (2014); XXV (2016)

=== Temporary ===
Image	Name	Years active	Instruments	Details
	Chris Dora	1998; 1999 (both touring)	drums	Dora filled in for a Canadian tour during July 1998, then again for shows in March and August 1999.
	Mark Perry	1999 (touring)	drums	Perry filled in on drums for shows in April and May 1999, in between Chris Dora's two tenures.
	Dave Culross	1999 (session)	drums	With the band still without a permanent drummer, Culross played on the album The Infernal Storm.
	Richard Christy	2000 (touring)	drums	After the recording of The Infernal Storm, Christy played drums on tour for a few months in 2000.
	Belial Koblak	2002 (touring)	vocals; rhythm guitar	After the departure of Mike Saez in the fall of 2001, Koblak filled in for live dates in early 2002.
	Vincent Crowley	2002 (touring)	vocals; rhythm guitar	Crowley followed Koblak as Incantation's live vocalist/rhythm guitarist, covering shows in the summer.
	David Haley	2003 (touring)	drums	Haley filled in for Kyle Severn at one show on June 28, 2003, after the drummer injured his wrist.
	Thomas Pioli	2003 (touring)	lead guitar	Pioli played guitar on a run of Brazilian shows in November 2003, before being fired in December.
	Ilmar Uibo	2004 (touring)	drums	Uibo filled in for shows in October and November 2004, after Kyle Severn's mother suddenly died.
	Roberto Lizárraga	2005–2006; 2007; 2008; 2009 (all touring)	bass	Lizárraga filled in on bass during 2005, 2006, June 2007, May 2008, and October 2009.
	Tomasz "Reyash" Rejek	2007 (touring)	bass	After Lombard's permanent departure, Rejek filled in during shows in early and summer 2007.
	Craig Smilowski	2007 (touring)	drums	Smilowski took over from Jim Roe as Incantation's touring drummer for shows in summer/fall 2007.
	Sam Inzerra	2012 (touring)	drums	Inzerra stood in for Kyle Severn during several shows in Brazil and Europe during spring/summer 2012.
	James Coppolino	2018 (touring)	drums	Coppolino toured with Incantation on several runs during 2018, filling in for the unavailable Severn.
	Frank Schilperoort	2018–2020 (touring)	drums	Schilperoort filled in for drummer Kyle Severn during multiple tours between 2018 and 2020.
	Scott Pivarnick	2022 (touring)	bass	After Luke Shively became a full-time band member, Pivarnick and Von stood in on live bass.
	Dan Vadim Von	2022–2023 (touring)	bass	After Luke Shively became a full-time band member, Pivarnick and Von stood in on live bass.
	Charles Koryn	2023 (touring)	drums	Koryn filled in for Kyle Severn during 2023, performing alongside Dan Vadim Von and Brian Rush.
	Brian Rush	2023 (touring)	bass	After Von was forced to leave during the 2023 tour, Rush took over towards the end of the year.
	Julian Guillen	2024 (touring)	bass	Guillen and Sengupta followed Rush in 2024 and 2025, respectively, as live touring bassists.
	Soikot Sengupta	2025 (touring)	bass	Guillen and Sengupta followed Rush in 2024 and 2025, respectively, as live touring bassists.

== Lineups ==
Period	Members	Releases
August 1989–January 1990	Paul Ledney — vocals, drums; John McEntee — lead guitar; Brett Makowski — rhythm guitar; Aragon Amori — bass	Reh 1.3.90 demo (1990)
March–August 1990	Will Rahmer — vocals; John McEntee — lead guitar; Sal Seijo — rhythm guitar; Ronnie Deo — bass; Peter Barnevic — drums	Demo #1 (1990); Entrantment of Evil (1990)
August–October 1990	Will Rahmer — vocals; John McEntee — lead guitar; Bill Venner — rhythm guitar; Ronnie Deo — bass; Jim Roe — drums	none
October 1990	Will Rahmer — vocals; John McEntee — guitar; Ronnie Deo — bass; Jim Roe — drums	none
November 1990–December 1992	Craig Pillard — vocals, rhythm guitar; John McEntee — lead guitar; Ronnie Deo — bass; Jim Roe — drums	Deliverance of Horrific Prophecies (1991); Onward to Golgotha (1992); Blasphemous Cremation (2008)
December 1992–August 1993	Craig Pillard — vocals, rhythm guitar; John McEntee — lead guitar; Dan Kamp — bass; Jim Roe — drums	"Emaciated Holy Figure" (1993)
November 1993–July 1994	Craig Pillard — vocals, rhythm guitar; John McEntee — lead guitar; Dave Niedrist — bass; John Brody — drums (Note: Jim Roe played drums on Mortal Throne of Nazarene and Upon the Throne of Apocalypse instead of Brody.)	Mortal Throne of Nazarene (1994); Upon the Throne of Apocalypse (1995)
July–August 1994	Duane Morris — vocals, guitar (touring); John McEntee — lead guitar; Dave Niedrist — bass; John Brody — drums	none
September–October 1994	Duane Morris — vocals, rhythm guitar; John McEntee — lead guitar; Randy Scott — bass; Kyle Severn — drums	none
October–November 1994	Duane Morris — vocals, rhythm guitar; John McEntee — lead guitar; Kyle Severn — drums	none
January–July 1995	Duane Morris — vocals, rhythm guitar; John McEntee — lead guitar; Mike Donnelly — bass; Kyle Severn — drums	none
July–August 1995	Daniel Corchado — vocals, guitar (touring); John McEntee — lead guitar; Mike Donnelly — bass; Kyle Severn — drums	none
December 1995–April 1996	Will Rahmer — vocals; John McEntee — lead guitar; Mike Saez — rhythm guitar; Mary Ciullo — bass; Kyle Severn — drums	Promo 1996 (1996)
March–November 1996	Nathan Rossi — vocals, rhythm guitar; John McEntee — lead guitar; Mike Saez — rhythm guitar; Kevin Hughes — bass; Kyle Severn — drums	none
December 1996–February 1997	Craig Pillard — vocals (session); John McEntee — lead and rhythm guitars; Kevin Hughes — bass; Kyle Severn — drums	The Forsaken Mourning of Angelic Anguish (1997) — original version
February/March 1997	Craig Pillard — vocals (session); John McEntee — lead guitar; Mike Saez — rhythm guitar (session); Kevin Hughes — bass; Kyle Severn — drums	Tribute to the Goat (1997)
March/April 1997	Craig Pillard — vocals (session); John McEntee — lead and rhythm guitars; Daniel Corchado — bass (session); Kyle Severn — drums	The Forsaken Mourning of Angelic Anguish (1997) — four reissue bonus tracks
April–June 1997	Daniel Corchado — vocals, bass (touring); John McEntee — lead guitar; Mike Saez — rhythm guitar (touring); Kyle Severn — drums	none
June–December 1997	Daniel Corchado — vocals, guitar, bass; John McEntee — lead guitar; Kyle Severn — drums	Diabolical Conquest (1998)
December 1997–July 1998	Daniel Corchado — vocals, rhythm guitar; John McEntee — lead guitar; Rob Yench — bass; Kyle Severn — drums	none
June–August 1998	Tom Stevens — vocals, guitar (touring); John McEntee — lead guitar; Rob Yench — bass; Kyle Severn — drums	none
October–November 1998	Tom Stevens — vocals, rhythm guitar; John McEntee — lead guitar; Rob Yench — bass; Clay Lytle — drums	none
January–February 1999	Tom Stevens — vocals, rhythm guitar; John McEntee — lead guitar; Rob Yench — bass; Rick "Slim" Boast — drums	none
March 1999	Tom Stevens — vocals, rhythm guitar; John McEntee — lead guitar; Rob Yench — bass; Chris Dora — drums (touring)	none
April–May 1999	Tom Stevens — vocals, rhythm guitar; John McEntee — lead guitar; Rob Yench — bass; Mark Perry — drums (touring)	none
August 1999	Mike Saez — vocals, guitar (touring); John McEntee — lead guitar; Rob Yench — bass; Chris Dora — drums (touring)	none
November–December 1999	Mike Saez — vocals, rhythm guitar; John McEntee — lead guitar; Rob Yench — bass; Dave Culross — drums (session)	The Infernal Storm (2000)
March–June 2000	Mike Saez — vocals, rhythm guitar; John McEntee — lead guitar; Rob Yench — bass; Richard Christy — drums (touring)	none
August 2000–May 2001	Mike Saez — vocals, rhythm guitar; John McEntee — lead guitar; Rob Yench — bass; Kyle Severn — drums	Live: Blasphemy in Brazil Tour 2001 (2001)
Summer–fall 2001	Mike Saez — vocals, rhythm guitar; John McEntee — lead guitar; Joe Lombard — bass; Kyle Severn — drums	Blasphemy (2002)
March–May 2002	Belial Koblak — vocals, guitar (touring); John McEntee — lead guitar; Joe Lombard — bass; Kyle Severn — drums	none
June–August 2002	Vincent Crowley — vocals, guitar (touring); John McEntee — lead guitar; Joe Lombard — bass; Kyle Severn — drums	none
January–September 2003	John McEntee — vocals, rhythm guitar; Sonny Lombardozzi — lead guitar (touring); Joe Lombard — bass; Kyle Severn — drums	none
October–December 2003	John McEntee — vocals, rhythm guitar; Thomas Pioli — lead guitar (touring); Joe Lombard — bass; Kyle Severn — drums	none
December 2003–late 2006	John McEntee — vocals, guitar; Joe Lombard — bass (Note: Lombard did not tour during much of 2005 and 2006, with his place taken by Roberto Lizárraga.); Kyle Severn — drums	Decimate Christendom (2004); "Thieves of the Cloth" (2006); Primordial Domination (2006); "Scapegoat" (2010)
February–March 2007	John McEntee — vocals, guitar; Tomasz Rejek — bass (touring); Jim Roe — drums (touring)	none
May 2007	John McEntee — vocals, guitar; Alex Bouks — bass (touring); Jim Roe — drums (touring)	none
June–August 2007	John McEntee — vocals, guitar; Roberto Lizárraga — bass (touring); Jim Roe — drums (touring)	none
August–October 2007	John McEntee — vocals, guitar; Tomasz Rejek — bass (touring); Craig Smilowski — drums (touring)	none
March–August 2008	Craig Pillard — vocals (touring) (Note: Some shows during this period did not feature Pillard, with McEntee performing vocals as normal.); John McEntee — lead guitar; Alex Bouks — rhythm guitar (touring); Chuck Sherwood — bass (touring); Jim Roe — drums (touring)	none
Summer 2009–March 2014	John McEntee — vocals, rhythm guitar; Alex Bouks — lead guitar; Chuck Sherwood — bass; Kyle Severn — drums	"Absolved in Blood" (2011); "Degeneration" (2012); Vanquish in Vengeance (2012)
March 2014–December 2019	John McEntee — vocals, rhythm guitar; Sonny Lombardozzi — lead guitar; Chuck Sherwood — bass; Kyle Severn — drums	Profane Nexus (2017); Sect of Vile Divinities (2020)
December 2019–present	John McEntee — vocals, rhythm guitar; Luke Shively — lead guitar; Chuck Sherwood — bass; Kyle Severn — drums	Split with Blood (2022); Unholy Deification (2023)
