= Diskord =

Norwegian metal band

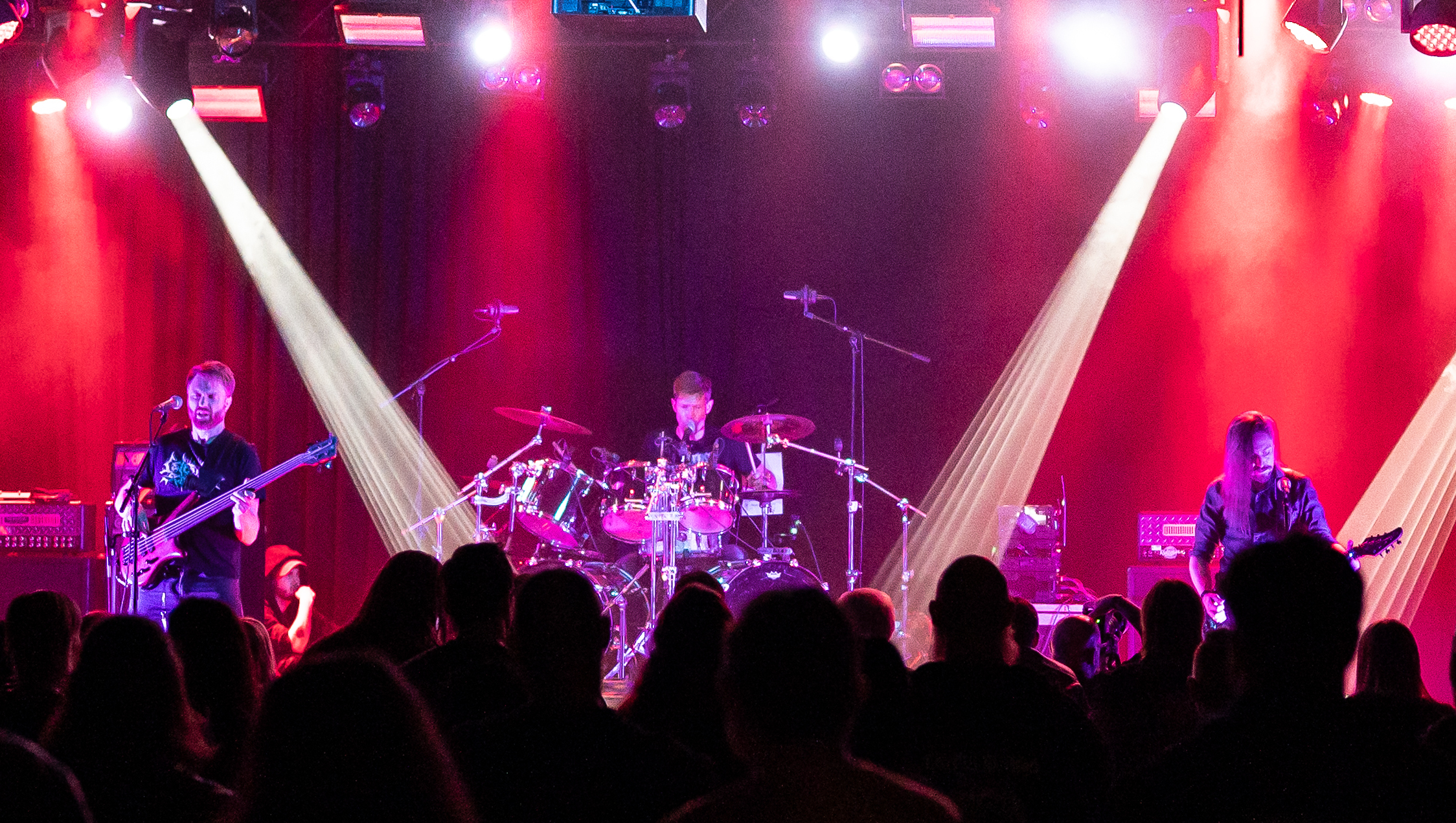
- At Southern Discomfort metal festival 2025

Background information
- Origin: Oslo, Norway
- Genre: Technical death metal
- Years active: 1999–present
- Label: Transcending Obscurity Records
- Website: http://diskord.net/

Diskord is a disharmonic–technical death metal band from Oslo. The band was started in 1999. Diskord's music can be categorized as doomy, progressive/technical death metal, while several critics have labeled the band as hard to classify genre-wise. Nevertheless, their releases have been critically acclaimed, as for instance evidenced by Austin Weber's piece in the No Clean Singing webzine: "Regardless of what comes out this year, I will be jamming Dystopics a lot; in retrospect. it’s my favorite death metal album from last year", and their inclusion in Norwegian newspaper Tønsberg Blad's list of best albums of the year.

The band has toured extensively and played a number of festivals including several appearances at the Inferno Metal Festival and by:Larm in Oslo, Mono Goes Metal and Kill-Town in Denmark, Old Grave fest in Bucharest, Hole in the Sky in Bergen, Szczecin Extreme Festival in Poland, Asakusa Deathfest in Japan. Diskord was supporting Nasum in Bologna and Possessed in Prague, Behemoth in South Africa, Johannesburg, toured with Dødheimsgard and Cryptic Brood in Europe.

In 2020, the band signed to Transcending Obscurity Records for the release of their upcoming full-length album, same record label as Dmitry's band Defect Designer is signed with.

== Band members ==
- Eyvind W. Axelsen – Bass guitar/Electric upright bass/vocals
- Hans Jørgen Ersvik – Drums/vocals
- Dmitry Sukhinin – Guitar/vocals
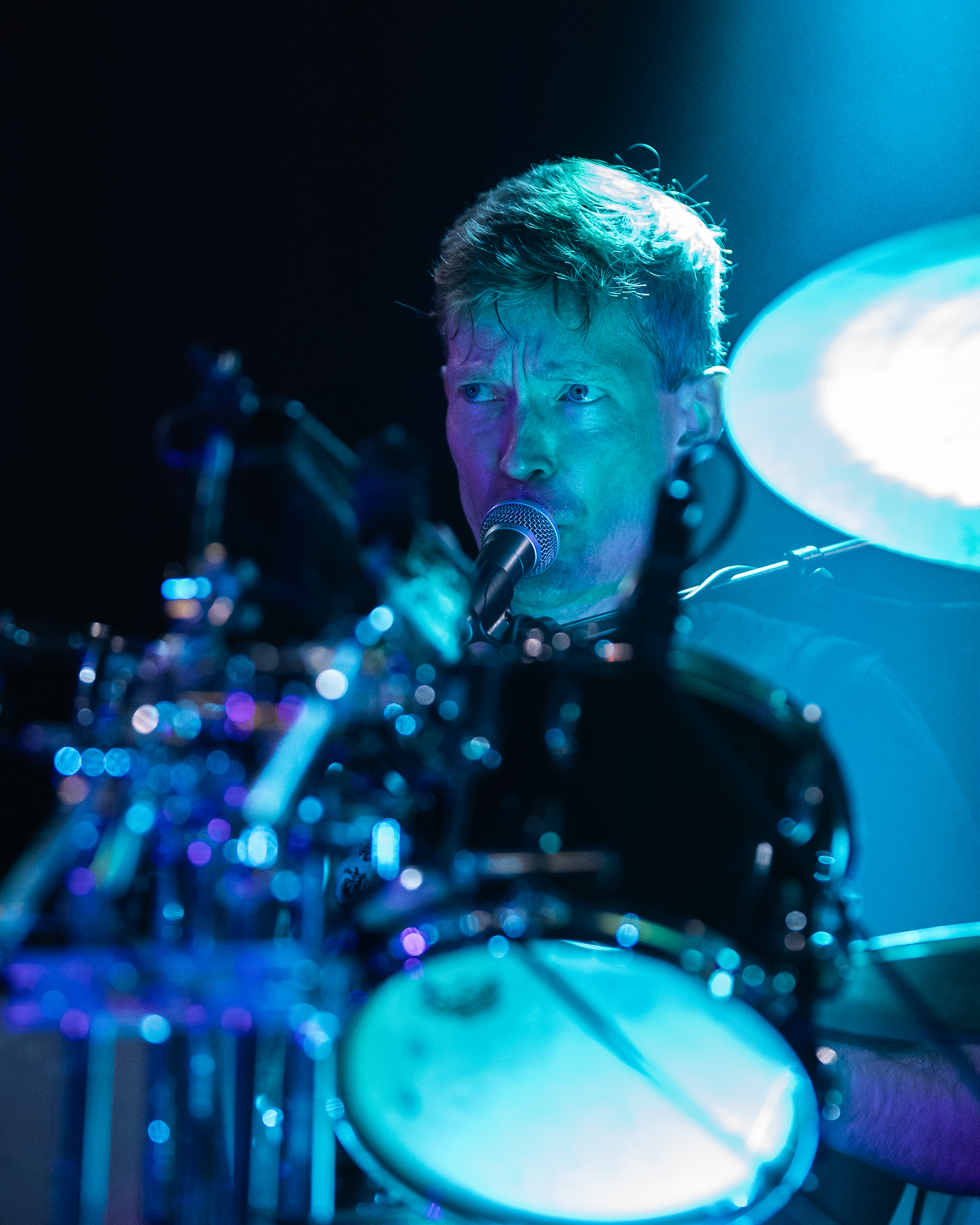
Hans Jørgen Ersvik

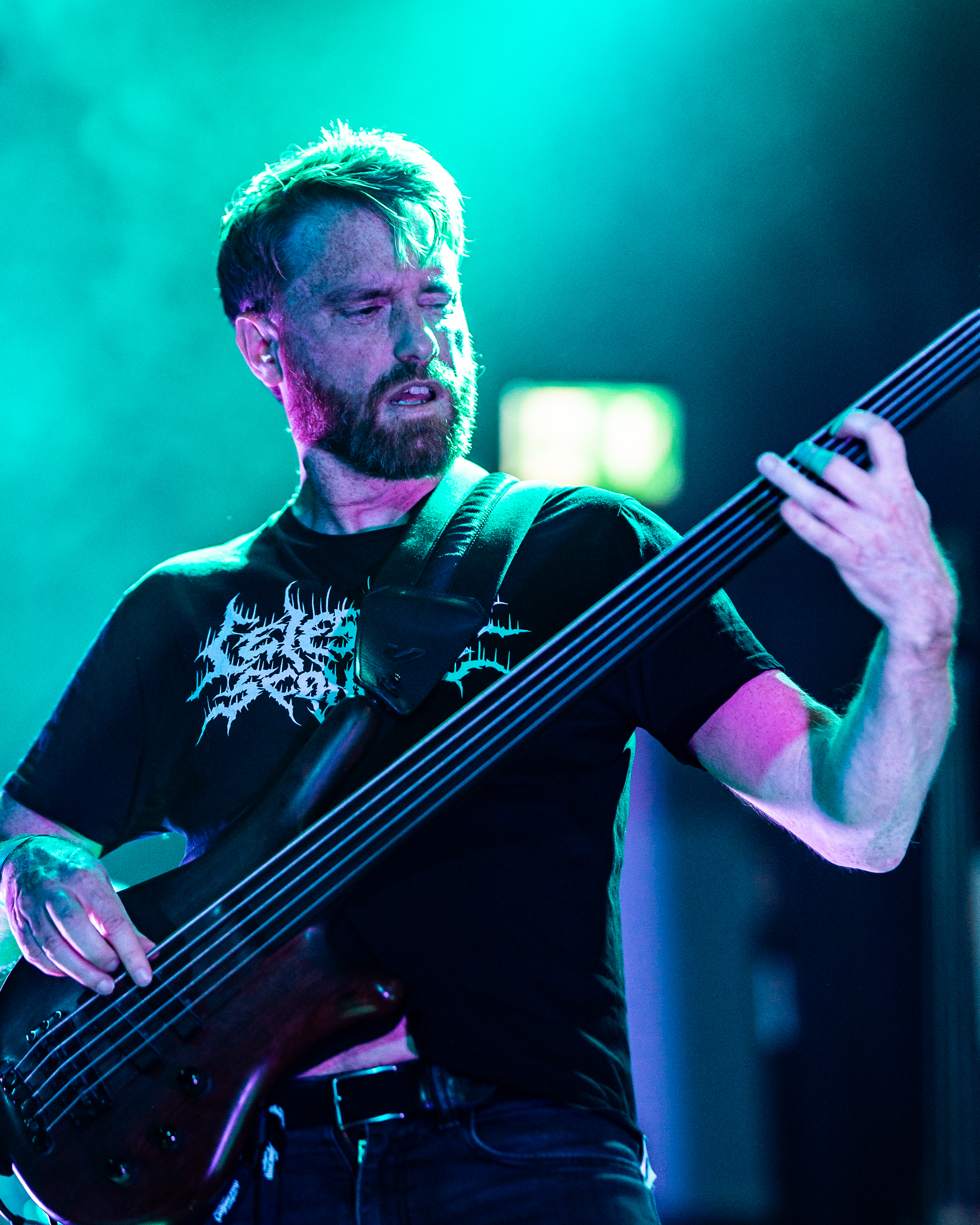
Eyvind W. Axelsen

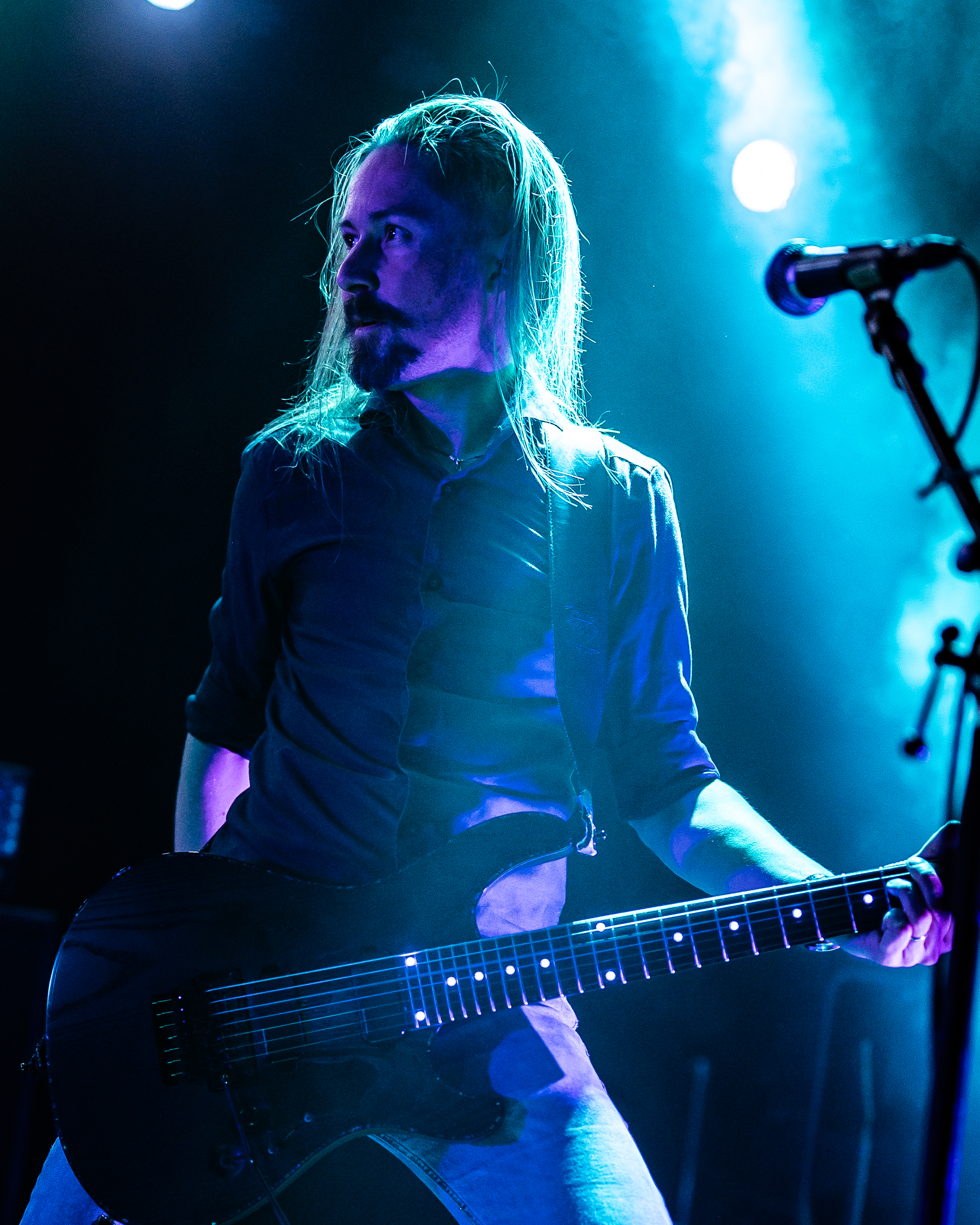
Dmitry Sukhinin

== Former members ==
- Håvard Østli – guitar 2011 – 2014
- Espen T. Hangård – guitar 2007 – 2011
- Chris Myhre/Channard – guitar 1999 – 2007
- Kvile – guitar 2001 – 2002

== Videos ==
- Horrid Engine
- A Downward Spire

== Discography ==
=== Studio albums ===
- Doomscapes – Edgerunner Music, 2007
- Dystopics – No Posers Please!, 2012
- Oscillations – Australopithecus Records (USA)/Hellthrasher Productions (Europe), 2014
- Degenerations – Transcending Obscurity Records, 2021

=== Demos and miscellaneous ===
- Demo 2001 – self-released, 2001
- Aural Abjection – self-released, 2003
- HDFH – Vendlus Records, 2005
- Oslo We Rot – split with Obliteration, Execration and Lobotomized – Unborn Productions, 2010
- Bipolarities - split with Atvm - Transcending Obscurity Records, 2024
