= Satanath Records =

- Founded: 2012
- Founder: Aleksey K.
- Location: Russia

Satanath Records is a Russian independent record label founded by Aleksey K. in 2012. The label has a diverse offering of artists, releasing albums in the extreme metal, folk, ambient, noise, and post-rock styles. Acts on the label's roster include Skeletal Remains, Degragore, Vomitile, Obscenity and Mouldered. Symbol of Domination Prod is a subsidiary of the label. Regarding the label's ideology, Aleksey told Decibel: "Fuck religion, politics and other scum, humanity will survive, I hope, and our CDs will lay as a rare relic in some compartment of an intergalactic spaceship..."

== See also ==
- Hells Headbangers Records
- Comatose Music
- Redefining Darkness Records
- Transcending Obscurity Records
