= Profane Nexus =

Studio album by Incantation
- Released: August 11, 2017
- Studio: Incantation Studios
- Genre: Death metal; death-doom
- Length: 42:32
- Label: Relapse

Incantation chronology
Dirges of Elysium (2014)	Profane Nexus (2017)	Sect of Vile Divinities (2020)

Profane Nexus is the tenth full-length studio album by the American death metal band Incantation. The album was released on August 11, 2017 through Relapse Records, and is their first release on the label since their 2000 album The Infernal Storm. The album was recorded in the band's own Incantation Studios in Johnstown, PA and was mixed and mastered by Dan Swanö. The album received generally positive reviews from music critics and reached no. 18 on the Billboard Top Heatseekers Chart and no. 32 on the Independent Chart.

== Artwork ==
The cover artwork was created by Israeli artist Eliran Kantor based on the album's lyrical themes as explained to him by Chuck Sherwood. In an interview with And Justice For Art, Kantor stated that Sherwood "showed me the lyrics he wrote and went into details about the themes behind each song. There was one song dealing with the natural habits of locusts and one about a deity who's wearing flayed human skin," He also added that "I imagined it having a monster-like body made of tar, with the locusts draping it with skin parts they pick from a pit full of human sacrifice." He also explained that "'The Night Drinker' was about the Mayan deity Xipe Totec. Chuck explained a specific ritual involving Xipe Totec as “People would be flayed (skinned alive) so that a medium for this god could wear the skin for 20 days, to be the living interpretation of it”. I imagined the deity having an arachnoid body made of tar, with the locusts draping it with skin bits they pick from a pit full of human sacrifice."

== Critical reception ==
Professional ratings
Review scores
Source	Rating
Decibel	8/10
Exclaim!	8/10
Metal Injection	9/10
Sputnikmusic	2.9/5
Terrorizer	8.5/10

The album received generally positive reviews from music critics. Critics noted that Profane Nexus is a logical continuation of the typical death-doom style of metal that Incantation have performed on previous albums, but Decibel described the album as "Incantation’s best material in years", while both Exclaim! and Decibel praised the "diversity" of songs on the album as "refreshing." Critics also noted the ominous, disturbing atmosphere and the strong songwriting. Metal Injection wrote that "It’s genuinely thrilling to hear a band sound so good so many years into their career." José Carlos Santos of Terrorizer gave the album a high rating, and wrote, "Tenth full-length 'Profane Nexus' is vintage Incantation [...] it maintains that unbeatable dirty subterranean feeling of the band's early classics with an extra bit of bite soundwise [...] to show that the band isn't frozen in time either." Sputnikmusic were more critical of the album, writing that "Everything is just too tidy and measured, right down to the typewriter drums and quintessentially Relapse guitar-tone."

== Track listing ==
No.	Title	Length
1.	"Muse"	5:11
2.	"Rites of the Locust"	3:06
3.	"Visceral Hexahedron"	5:15
4.	"The Horns of Gefrin"	3:46
5.	"Incorporeal Despair"	3:20
6.	"Xipe Totec"	1:01
7.	"Lus Sepulcri"	4:25
8.	"Stormgate Convulsions from the Thunderous Shores of Infernal Realms Beyond the Grace of God"	2:12
9.	"Messiah Nostrum"	4:20
10.	"Omens to the Altar of Onyx"	3:56
11.	"Ancients Arise"	6:00
Total length:		42:32

== Personnel ==
=== Incantation ===
- John McEntee – vocals, rhythm guitar
- Sonny Lombadozzi – lead guitar
- Chuck Sherwood – bass, lyrics
- Kyle Severn – drums

=== Additional personnel ===
- Eliran Kantor – artwork
- Jacob Speis – layout
- Scott Kinkade – photography
- Dan Swanö – mixing, mastering
- Matthew "Zilla" Draudt – engineering
- Dennis Clintworks – assistant engineer

== Charts ==
Chart (2017)	Position
US Heatseekers Chart (Billboard)	18
US Independent Chart (Billboard)	32
