= John McEntee =

John McEntee may refer to:

- John McEntee (Gaelic footballer) (born 1977)
- John McEntee (musician) (born 1969), American death metal musician
- John McEntee (political aide) (born 1990), director of the White House Presidential Personnel Office in the Trump Administration
