= Defect Designer =

Death metal band

- Origin: Novosibirsk, Novosibirsk Oblast, Russia (early); Oslo, Norway (later)
- Genre: Technical death metal
- Years active: 2005–present
- Members: Dmitry Sukhinin; Martin Storm-Olsen
- Website: defect-designer.com

Defect Designer is a progressive death metal band from Oslo but originally coming from Akademgorodok, part of the Siberian city Novosibirsk.

== History ==
In 2007 Defect Designer in Novosibirsk recorded their first four-track promo named "W". In February, 2008 Defect Designer entered Hertz Studio, Poland (which had previously recorded Vader, Decapitated, Behemoth, Sceptic) without any financial support from labels. In 2012 frontman relocated to Oslo severing ties with all members. Since then, the band has released several works cooperating with members of SepticFlesh, Cryptopsy, Fleshgod Apocalypse and Soilwork.

The band was reformed in Oslo and recorded the follow-up Ageing Accelerator in 2013 featuring Flo Mounier from Cryptopsy on drums, Christos Antoniou from SepticFlesh on orchestration, Stelios Mavromitis (SepticFlesh live guitarist) on guitars and Dmitry Sukhinin on bass and vocals. During the mixing period, Martin Storm-Olsen from Trollfest had joined the band.

Defect Designer then had Eyvind Axelsen from Diskord joining the band on bass, soon after the frontman Dmitry Sukhinin joining Diskord on guitar and vocals. Defect Designer have recorded the Neanderthal EP in home studio and released it in 2022 on Transcending Obscurity Records. The EP is regarded as a shift towards grindcore and features a cover for a classical piece from Georgi Sviridov - "Time, forward!".

The band proceeded with a longplay Chitin hiring Eugene Ryabchenko from Fleshgod Apocalypse on drums. Chitin is a dissonant death metal record, however, featuring Bjorn Strid from Soilwork on guest vocals on the Shine Shine song.

In 2025 the band have announced that they release their anticipated record Depressants that was released on 15.05.2026. Dmitry Sukhinin handled vocals, guitars, bass, music and lyrics. Martin Storm-Olsen handled guitars, bass, vocals, banjo, mandolin, 12-string acoustic guitar, done sound engineering and mixing. Drums were performed by Eugene Ryabchenko, as on Chitin. Björn Strid of Soilwork appears on the track “Expiration Deferral Request Denied”, Makeda Rose performs on “Body Count Of My Cow Tail”, Ottar Skifte from Shaving the Werewolf does vocals to “Butterfly Juice Straws”. The orchestral arrangements were done by Martin Skar Berger (ex-Blood Red Throne). Additional synthesizers were recorded by Maxim Salnikov, contrabass and electric cello parts were performed by Eyvind Axelsen (Diskord). The mastering was completed by Colin Marston (Gorguts). Artwork by longtime collaborator Ian Miller.

== Discography ==
Studio albums

- Wax (September, 2009, My Kingdom Music)
- Ageing Accelerator (2015, Sleaszy Rider Records)
- Chitin (2024, Transcending Obscurity Records)
- Depressants (2026, Transcending Obscurity Records)

EPs

- W (2007) - recorded in April, 2007
- AA (December, 2013, digitally)
- Neanderthal (July, 2022, Transcending Obscurity Records)

Compilations

- V/A Siberian Death metal CD (2007)
- V/A Putrid Tunes Compilation CD (2008)

== Video clips ==
- When Your Face Doesn't Melt Snowflakes - directed by Nader Sadek, taken from the "Wax" album.
- Yellow Grimace lyrics video - directed by Richard Oakes
- Crusaders lyrics video - directed by Richard Oakes
- Cowboys lyrics video - Portishead cover
- StarDust animated video
- Wrinkles
