= Diabolical Conquest =

Studio album by Incantation
- Released: April 28, 1998
- Recorded: November–December 1997
- Studio: Mars Studio, Cleveland
- Genre: Death metal; death-doom
- Length: 45:17
- Label: Relapse
- Producer: Bill Korecky; Incantation; Matthew F. Jacobson (exec.); Bill Yurkiewicz (exec.)

Incantation chronology
Mortal Throne of Nazarene (1994)	Diabolical Conquest (1998)	The Infernal Storm (2000)

Professional ratings
Review scores
Source	Rating
Sputnikmusic	4.5/5 stars
Chronicles of Chaos	9/10 stars
Exclaim!	9/10 stars

Diabolical Conquest is the third studio album by American death metal band Incantation, released on April 28, 1998 by Relapse Records. It is the only album to feature Daniel Corchado of The Chasm on vocals, and the first album to feature Kyle Severn on drums. Diabolical Conquest frequently tops ranking lists of the band’s best albums and is praised for its focus, consistency and strong songwriting.

Diabolical Conquest webzine was named as a tribute to this album. Later, Kunal Choksi founded the record label Diabolical Conquest Records.

== Track listing ==
All lyrics are written by John McEntee, except "Desecration (of the Heavenly Graceful)" by Daniel Corchado; all music is composed by McEntee and Kyle Severn, except where noted.

No.	Title	Music	Length
1.	"Impending Diabolical Conquest"		5:13
2.	"Desecration (of the Heavenly Graceful)"	Corchado, Severn, McEntee	5:54
3.	"Disciples of Blasphemous Reprisal"		3:32
4.	"Unheavenly Skies"	Corchado, Severn, McEntee	2:20
5.	"United in Repungence"		3:57
6.	"Shadows of the Ancient Empire"		3:02
7.	"Ethereal Misery"		4:29
8.	"Unto Infinite Twilight / Majesty of Infernal Damnation"		16:47

== Personnel ==
=== Incantation ===
- Daniel Corchado - bass, guitar, vocals
- John McEntee - guitar
- Kyle Severn - drums

=== Additional personnel ===
- Bill Korecky - producer, engineer
- Dave Shirk & Bill Yurkiewicz - mastering
- Miran Kim - Cover artwork
