= Avi (disambiguation) =

Avi is a masculine given name.

Avi or AVI may also refer to:

- Avi (author), pen name of children's author Edward Irving Wortis (born 1937)
- Zee Avi, Malaysian singer-songwriter, guitarist, and ukulele player Izyan Alirahman (born 1985)
- .avi (Audio Video Interleave)
- .avi (album), second studio album by Serbian experimental band Consecration
- Avi, Iran, a village in Zanjan Province
- AVI BioPharma, a biopharmaceutical company
- AVI Records, an American independent record label
- Avi Resort & Casino, Nevada, United States
- American Virgin Islands
- Judged by Your Work Party (Asa Vita no Ifampitsarana, Akaiky ny Vahoaka Indrindra)
- Automatic Vehicle Identification, a technology that uses optical character recognition on images to read vehicle registration plates to create vehicle location data
- Arkansas Valley Interurban Railway
- Australian Volunteers International
- Regional State Administrative Agency (Finnish: aluehallintovirasto), the former regional organs of the state of Finland
- An abbreviation of Avatar (computing)
