= Intestine Baalism =

Japanese metal band

- Origin: Tokyo, Japan
- Genres: Melodic death metal
- Years active: 1991–present
- Labels: Repulse; Blackend
- Members: Seiji Kakuzaki; Hisao Hashimoto; Kenji Minagawa; Kenji Nonaka
- Past members: Katsumasa Yoshida; Osanu Somenoya; Atsushi Miyata; Hideyuki Yamada; Jiro Ito

Intestine Baalism is a Japanese melodic death metal band from Tokyo.

They have been compared to the likes of At the Gates, Carcass, Dismember and Morpheus Descends.

== History ==
The band was formed in 1991 as a thrash metal group under the name Euthanasia before changing their name to Intestine Baalism in 1994. They released the demo, The Energumenus, in 1995 followed by their debut album, An Anatomy of the Beast, in 1997. Their sophomore album, Banquet in the Darkness, came out in 2003. In 2008, they released their third and most recent album, Ultimate Instinct.

== Members ==
=== Current ===
- Seiji Kakuzaki – vocals, guitar (1994–present)
- Hisao Hashimoto – drums (2000–present)
- Kenji Minagawa – bass (2003–present)
- Kenji Nonaka – vocals, guitar (2006–present)

=== Past ===
- Katsumasa Yoshida – bass (1994–2003)
- Takeshi Ohkouchi – drums (1994–1997)
- Osanu Somenoya – guitar (1994)
- Atsushi Miyata – guitar (1995–1998)
- Hideyuki Yamada – drums (1998–1999)
- Jiro Ito – guitar (2000–2006)

== Discography ==
=== Albums ===
- An Anatomy of the Beast (1997)
- Banquet in the Darkness (2003)
- Ultimate Instinct (2008)

=== Demos ===
- The Energumenus (1995)
