= Demoncy =

American black metal band

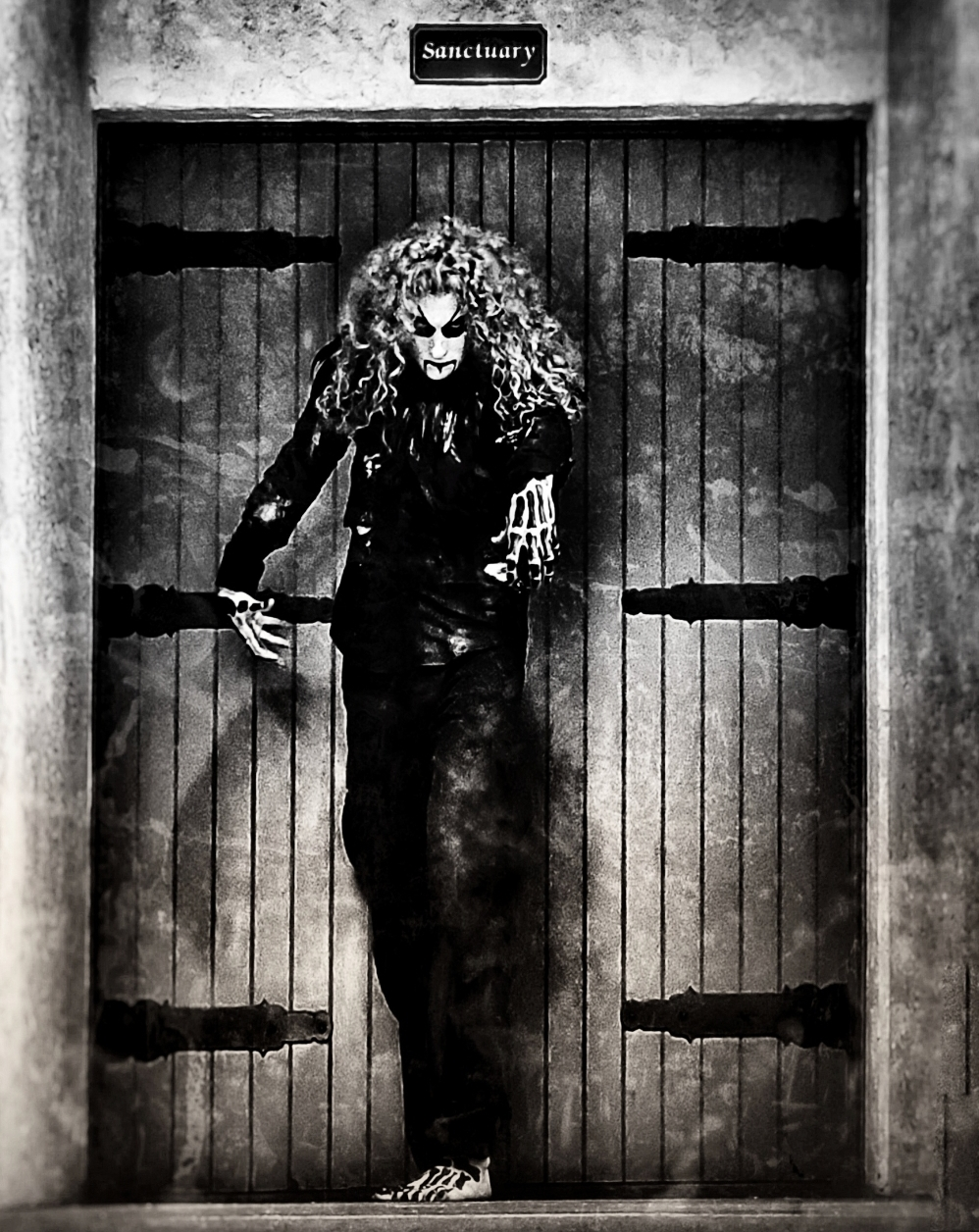
- Ixithra of Demoncy c. 2020

Background information
- Origin: Sylva, North Carolina, U.S.
- Genre: Black metal
- Years active: 1989-present
- Labels: Nuclear War Now, Hells Headbangers, Dark Descent, Forever Plagued
- Members: Ixithra; VJS; Scorpios Androctonus
- Past members: Aeldeost; Diabolicus; Drathrul; Elsifer; Horidus; Neptersu; Synvorlath; Vorthrus; Vetharanyn; Vlasoroth; Xelac

Demoncy is an American black metal band formed in 1989 in Sylva, North Carolina by musician Ixithra. They are one of the first American black metal bands.

== History ==
The band formed in 1989 as a solo project by Ixithra to express darkness through art. He has been known as Wicked Warlock Of Demonic Blasphemy and Lord Of The Sylvan Shadows. The music is regarded as otherworldly and demonic.

In 1992, Ixithra joined USBM band Profanatica as a guitar player. Displeased with the sound of the album on which he performed, Ixithra set an industrial magnet to the master tapes, destroying them. He left the band and reformed Demoncy.

The 1999 release of Joined in Darkness was a milestone Demoncy. It is regarded as a fine example of USBM. The band toured the US and Europe, and were featured in several metal music festivals.

Throughout the several versions of Demoncy, Ixithra has fired his entire band for lacking the musicianship that black metal requires.

== Significance ==
Demoncy is credited as early practitioners of American black metal who did not imitate the early Norwegian black metal scene.

== Style and ideology ==
Demoncy is known for avoiding commercial appeal and mainstream success, focusing on the occult and the purity of darkness in music.

Song lyrics center on occult and magical themes.

== Members ==
=== Current ===
- Ixithra
- VJS
- Scorpios Androctonus

=== Former ===
Bass

- Necreon
- Neptersu
- Xelac

Drums

- Vorthrus

Guitar

- Aeldeost
- Drathrul
- Elsifer
- Grymoreth
- Maldis
- Zyuhlniv

Lyricist

- Vetharanyn

Vocals

- Diabolicus
- Horidus
- Synvorlath

== Discography ==
=== Studio albums ===
- Faustian Dawn (1993, self-released cassette; 1995 CD, So It Is Done Productions))
- Within The Sylvan Realms Of Frost (1999, So It Is Done Productions)
- Joined in Darkness (1999, Baphomet Records)
- Empire Of The Fallen Angel (2003, Blood, Fire, Death Records)
- Enthroned is the Night (2012, Forever Plagued Records)
- Black Star Gnosis (2023, Dark Descent Records)

=== Demos ===
- "Impure Blessings (Dark Angel of the Four Wings)" (1991, cassette, self-released)
- "Hypocrisy of the Accursed Heavens" (1994, cassette, self-released)
- "Ascension of a Star Long Since Fallen" (1995, cassette, self-released)
- "The Dawn of Eternal Damnation" (1996, self-released)
- "Commencement of the Dark Crusades" (1996, self-released)

=== DVDs ===
- Demoncy Live (2003)
- Gathering of Shadows (2006)
