= Vanquish in Vengeance =

Studio album by Incantation
- Released: November 27, 2012
- Genre: Death metal
- Length: 52:00
- Label: Listenable
- Producer: Bill Korecky, Incantation

Incantation chronology
Primordial Domination (2006)	Vanquish in Vengeance (2012)	Dirges of Elysium (2014)

Professional ratings
Review scores
Source	Rating
About.com	4/5 stars
AllMusic	4/5 stars
Blistering	7.5/10 stars
Exclaim!	7/10 stars
Pitchfork Media	7.8/10 stars

Vanquish in Vengeance is the eighth studio album by the American death metal band Incantation. The album was released on November 27, 2012.

== Track listing ==
No.	Title	Length
1.	"Invoked Infinity"	3:17
2.	"Ascend into the Eternal"	4:34
3.	"Progeny of Tyranny"	3:45
4.	"Transcend into Absolute Dissolution"	6:49
5.	"Haruspex"	3:56
6.	"Vanquish in Vengeance"	3:15
7.	"Profound Loathing"	8:01
8.	"Hellions Genesis"	4:17
9.	"From Hollow Sands"	3:08
10.	"Legion of Dis"	11:57
Total length:		52:00

== Personnel ==
- John McEntee - guitars, vocals
- Alex Bouks - guitar
- Kyle Severn - drums
- Chuck Sherwood - bass

== Production and miscellaneous staff ==
- Bill Korecky & Incantation - production
- Dan Swanö - mixing, mastering
- Bill Korecky - recording, engineering
- Kristoff Bates - photography
- Will Kuberski - cover art
- Matt Vickerstaff - layout, design
- Josh Eldridge - management
- John Litchko - guitar engineering
- Lance Walter - engineering
