= Onward to Golgotha =

Studio album by Incantation
- Released: May 5, 1992
- Recorded: September–November 1991
- Studios: Trax East Studios, South River, New Jersey
- Genres: Death metal; blackened death metal; death-doom
- Length: 45:26
- Label: Relapse
- Producers: Steve Evetts; Matthew F. Jacobson (exec.); Bill Yurkiewicz (exec.)

Incantation chronology
| Onward to Golgotha (1992) | Mortal Throne of Nazarene (1994) |

Professional ratings
Review scores
| Source | Rating |
|---|---|
| AllMusic | 3.5/5 stars |

Onward to Golgotha is the debut studio album by American death metal band Incantation, released on May 5, 1992 by Relapse Records. It was re-released in October 2006 with a bonus DVD of live performances. Decibel added the album to their hall of fame. To celebrate being added to the hall of fame, it was re-released on 180-gram vinyl, but limited to only 1,000 copies.

== Background and recording ==
Guitarist John McEntee said the album's recording was the band's first time in the studio. The album was a collection of songs that the band had already written and released on demos, which McEntee described as a "collage". He recalled in 2017:

"We were really excited, but we were such novices. We didn’t know how to get the sound we wanted. We just didn’t know how to do it properly. It wasn’t necessarily the tightest of albums, but the vibe on it was really good. It was our first album, so I thought it’d be really special to me. [...] Listening back, it’s just not enjoyable compared to some of the stuff we’ve done before. Vocal-wise, it was amazing, the playing was amazing. I was tight. I’m proud of the impact that it had, but in my personal opinion I think we’ve done some better stuff than that later on."

== Music ==
In response to the increasing commercial success of death metal in the early 1990s, the members of Incantation "were hell-bent on driving [the genre] back into darker underground regions where it had originally arisen from in the mid-to-late ’80s with bands like Possessed, Celtic Frost, Bathory and Death," according to Scott Koerber of Decibel. Hence, the sound on Onward to Golgotha has been characterized by a "morbid, funereal atmosphere", drawing influence from black metal and doom metal. Scott Koerber of Decibel described the album's sound as utilizing "swarming guitars, blasting darkness and crushing doom" guided by a "warlike, blackened death metal pace, with abstract leads and pinch harmonics illuminating the tangled mass." Greg Prato of AllMusic described the album as "the sound of being swallowed whole into the bowels of hell" and "death metal at its most extreme."

Incantation guitarist John McEntee cited the 1985 album Seven Churches by Possessed as a major influence on Onward to Golgotha.

== Reception and legacy ==
Greg Prato of AllMusic gave the album three and a half stars out of five. He wrote: "Onward to Golgotha does not let up one iota in its intensity -- evidenced in the vocal growls, manic riffing, and wicked drumbeats -- from beginning to end. Take a gander at some of the song titles. [...] Any question of how brutal it all must sound? Didn't think so."

Guitarist John McEntee told Vice in 2017 regarding the album's impact and status as a fan favorite from the band's discography:

"I look at it like, I totally understand why people like that rawness, that immaturity. If anyone likes any of our stuff, I’m happy. If they like one song, that’s fine. I never have a problem with that. I respect everyone’s opinion. The fact that every one I played on, people like, is cool. I’m never condescending, Oh that stuff is crap. [Arch Enemy guitarist] Michael Amott did that when I met him, and it pissed me off. You played on the album—don’t look down on it! Don’t look down on us for loving it!"

In 2021, Tom Morgan of Invisible Oranges wrote: "The whole aesthetic of Onward To Golgotha is in fact so well-realised that it has come to define the sonic parameters of ‘old school death metal’ in our collective imaginations. Although Incantation and Relapse’s relationship would eventually turn sour, Onward To Golgotha is an undeniable genre masterpiece – the very first released by the then-fledgling label."

== Track listing ==
| No. | Title | Length |
|---|---|---|
| 1. | "Golgotha" | 3:29 |
| 2. | "Devoured Death" | 2:19 |
| 3. | "Blasphemous Cremation" | 4:24 |
| 4. | "Rotting Spiritual Embodiment" | 4:59 |
| 5. | "Unholy Massacre" | 4:38 |
| 6. | "Entrantment of Evil" | 2:39 |
| 7. | "Christening the Afterbirth" | 5:33 |
| 8. | "Immortal Cessation" | 3:26 |
| 9. | "Profanation" | 4:55 |
| 10. | "Deliverance of Horrific Prophecies" | 5:29 |
| 11. | "Eternal Torture" | 3:31 |

DVD

Cell Block Show

1. "Entrentment of Evil"
2. "Deliverance of Horrific Prophecies"
3. "Unholy Massacre"
4. "Devoured Death"
5. "Blasphemous Cremation"
6. "Profanation"
7. "Golgotha"

Studio 1 Show

1. "Devoured Death"
2. "Entrentment of Evil"
3. "Bleeding Torment (Necrophagia Cover)"
4. "Deliverance of Horrific Prophecies"

Flashes Show

1. "Deliverance of Horrific Prophecies"
2. "Devoured Death"
3. "Rotting Spiritual Embodiment"
4. "Unholy Massacre"
5. "Blasphemous Cremation"
6. "Christening the Afterbirth"
7. "Profanation"

== Personnel ==
=== Incantation ===
- Craig Pillard – guitar, vocals
- John McEntee – lead guitar
- Jim Roe – drums
- Ronny Deo – bass

=== Additional personnel ===
- Steve Evetts – producer, engineer
- Dave Shirk – mastering
- Miran Kim – cover artwork

== Sources ==
- http://www.metalsucks.net/2010/11/24/dont-forget-to-be-thank-for-fear-emptiness-decibel/
