= Blasphemy (Incantation album) =

Studio album by Incantation
- Released: June 12, 2002
- Recorded: June–October 2001
- Studio: Mars Recording Compound, Cleveland
- Genre: Death metal
- Length: 73:51
- Label: Necropolis
- Producer: Bill Korecky; Incantation

Incantation chronology
The Infernal Storm (2000)	Blasphemy (2002)	Decimate Christendom (2004)

Blasphemy is the fifth studio album by American death metal band Incantation, released on June 12, 2002 by Necropolis Records. It is dedicated to the memory of drummer Kyle Severn's brother, Chad.

== Track listing ==
All music is composed by John McEntee & Kyle Severn.

No.	Title	Lyrics	Length
1.	"Blasphemy"	Joe Lombard	4:16
2.	"The Fallen"	Lombard	2:26
3.	"Once Holy Throne"	McEntee	3:09
4.	"Crown of Decayed Salvation"	McEntee	5:43
5.	"Rotting with Your Christ"	McEntee, Lombard	3:37
6.	"His Weak Hand"	McEntee	5:03
7.	"The Sacrilegious Apocalypse of Righteousness and Agonizing Dementia (The Final Defilement of Your Lord)"		2:06
8.	"Deceiver (Self-Righteous Betrayer)"	Mike Saez	4:17
9.	"Seraphic Irreverence"	McEntee	2:53
10.	"Uprising Heresy"	Lombard	8:33
11.	"Misanthropic Indulgence"	McEntee, Lombard	5:40
12.	"Outro, Parts 1 & 2"		26:06

- Note that, many copies of the CD have the outro divided into two parts: part 1 is 23:00 exactly, while part 2 is 3:06.

== Personnel ==
=== Incantation ===
- John McEntee - guitars
- Joe Lombard - bass
- Kyle Severn - drums, Percussion

=== Additional personnel ===
- Mike Saez - vocals

=== Production ===
- Arranged by Incantation
- Produced by Incantation and Bill Korecky
- Recorded & Mixed by Bill Korekcy at Mars Recording Compound; mixed in January 2002
