= Dirges of Elysium =

Studio album by Incantation
- Released: June 10, 2014
- Genre: Death metal
- Length: 49:24
- Label: Listenable
- Producers: Bill Korecky, Incantation

Incantation chronology
Vanquish in Vengeance (2012)	Dirges of Elysium (2014)	Profane Nexus (2017)

Dirges of Elysium is the ninth studio album by the American death metal band Incantation. It was released in the EU on June 10, 2014, and in the US on June 24.

== Track listing ==
No.	Title	Length
1.	"Dirges of Elysium"	2:12
2.	"Debauchery"	4:03
3.	"Bastion of a Plagued Soul"	2:43
4.	"Carrion Prophecy"	4:30
5.	"From a Glaciate Womb"	7:39
6.	"Portal Consecration"	3:18
7.	"Charnel Grounds"	2:17
8.	"Impalement of Divinity"	3:44
9.	"Dominant Ethos"	2:43
10.	"Elysium (Eternity Is Nigh)": "I. Prologue (Millenium Is Elysium)"; "II. Lethe (Forgetfulness)"; "III. Acheron (Sorrow)"; "IV. Styx (Hate)"; "V. Phlegeton (Fire)"; "VI. Cocytus (Lamentation)"	16:23
Total length:		49:24

== Personnel ==
=== Incantation ===
- John McEntee - guitars, vocals
- Alex Bouks – guitar
- Chuck Sherwood – bass
- Kyle Severn – drums

=== Additional ===
- Eliran Kantor – artwork
- Secrets of the Black Arts – CD/Vinyl layout
