= Hells Headbangers Records =

American record label

- Founded: 2000
- Founder: Justin, Eric and Chase Horval
- Genre: Heavy metal music, extreme metal
- Location: Cleveland, Ohio
- Official website: hellsheadbangers.com

Hells Headbangers is an American independent record label and online record shop focused on extreme metal music, based out of Cleveland, Ohio. The label has signed acts such as Blood Feast, Profanatica, Rotting, Mortal Decay, Midnight, Blasphemic Cruelty and Perdition Temple. They have also released albums by Destroyer 666, Embalmer, and Incantation.

Hell's Headbangers is among the world's largest online extreme metal retail stores, and is also among the longest-standing independent record labels of all time.

== History ==
Hells Headbangers Records was formed by brothers Chase, Eric and Justin Horval in the year 2000. Hells co-owner Chase Horval recalled the label's founding was "mostly as a means to curb [their] boredom, discover new bands and build up our [their] vinyl collections." He said the label started life as an "online mail-order distro", and that they initially had "zero intention" of growing it into a record label. The label's first release was Spawn of Satan/Bloodsick split LP and CD in 2002. They chose "Hells Headbangers" as the name for the label because it "united all of the subgenres of metal" that their distro had in stock, which included death metal, black metal, thrash metal, grindcore, heavy metal, and doom metal. Chase Horval stated that their parents were oblivious to their retail activities until the company's inventory began overtaking the family's garage and hallways. According to Chase, their parents "had no concept of what" online shopping was.

The boys all worked at Pizza Hut together during this time. They did not own their own computer during their early years, and did business using their manager's computer, who Chase said "hooked them up". Chase also used the computer at the public library when they could not access their manager's computer. This also allowed him to learn markup languages such as HTML and high-level programming languages such as JavaScript, which came to his aid in the industry when e-commerce was "in its infancy".

== Other projects ==
Co-founder Justin Horval (known within the scene as "J-Dawg" or simply "The Dawg") established the DEAD BY DAWG YouTube channel during the 2020s, on which he has interviewed several high-profile musicians in the extreme metal scene, such as Glen Benton of Deicide and Matti Karki of Dismember. Additionally, he routinely mocks and ridicules people who he perceives to be "wimps [and] posers" within the extreme metal scene on the channel, according to an Apple Podcasts interviewer. Horval is also an avid bodybuilder and has spoken extensively about the topic in his videos.

== Controversy ==
Chase Horval has stated that the label has encountered issues with manufacturers who refused to print some of their albums due to controversial and/or blasphemous album covers and song titles, openly admitting that the label is enticed by media that it perceives to be "controversial". In 2017, MetalSucks published an open letter challenging the label to stop distributing albums by National Socialist black metal bands, which the site's writers described as "Nazi propaganda".

== See also ==
- Dark Descent Records
- Transcending Obscurity Records
- Comatose Music
- Redefining Darkness Records
- Satanath Records
