= Redefining Darkness Records =

Independent extreme metal record label

- Founder: Thomas Haywood
- Genre: Extreme metal
- Location: United States
- Official website: www.redefiningdarkness.com

Redefining Darkness Records is an independent record label focused on extreme metal founded by Thomas Haywood. According to Decibel, "the label doesn’t have a signature sound." They have signed bands such as Sentient Horror, Detherous, Appalling, Curse of Denial, Cleric, Tombs, Mortal Vision, Schattenfall, Kryptik Mutation, Throne, Hot Graves, Wretched Fate, Angerot, Consecration and Oxygen Destroyer.

The label hosted a music festival in 2022. It was called Into the Darkness. It was held on July 28 and July 30. Performing acts from outside the label's roster included Scattered Remnants, Deceased, Horrendous and Imperial Triumphant.

== See also ==
- Hells Headbangers Records
- Transcending Obscurity Records
- Comatose Music
- Satanath Records
