= Mortal Throne of Nazarene =

Studio album by Incantation
- Released: October 25, 1994
- Recorded: March 1994
- Studio: Excello Recording Studios, New York City
- Genre: Death metal; death-doom
- Length: 35:36
- Label: Relapse
- Producer: Matthew F. Jacobson (exec.); Bill Yurkiewicz (exec.)

Incantation chronology
Onward to Golgotha (1992)	Mortal Throne of Nazarene (1994)	Diabolical Conquest (1998)

Professional ratings
Review scores
Source	Rating
AllMusic	4.0/5 stars

Mortal Throne of Nazarene is the second studio album by American death metal band Incantation, released on October 25, 1994 by Relapse Records. The album had already been recorded in August 1993, but Relapse was unhappy with the results and had the band re-record it in its entirety in March 1994. The original 1993 mix was later released in 1995 under the title Upon the Throne of Apocalypse, with a reversed track listing.

== Track listing ==
- Tracks 2, 3, 4 and 6–8 by John McEntee and Craig Pillard. Tracks 1 and 5 by Dan Kemp, John McEntee and Craig Pillard.

No.	Title	Length
1.	"Demonic Incarnate"	5:51
2.	"Emaciated Holy Figure"	3:46
3.	"Iconoclasm of Catholicism"	3:15
4.	"Essence Ablaze"	3:24
5.	"Nocturnal Dominium"	5:40
6.	"The Ibex Moon"	4:36
7.	"Blissful Bloodshower"	0:51
8.	"Abolishment of Immaculate Serenity"	8:09

== Personnel ==
=== Incantation ===
- Craig Pillard – vocals, guitars, bass
- John McEntee – guitars, bass, mixing
- Dave Niedrist – bass
- Jim Roe – drums

=== Additional personnel ===
- Garris Shippon – engineer
- Mr. Bill – engineer
- Brian Sekula – mixing
- Dave Shirk – mastering
- Miran Kim – cover artwork
- Wes Benscoter – booklet and tray art
