= Ritual of Infinity =

Studio album by Morpheus Descends
- Released: 1992
- Recorded: January–September 1992
- Studio: Legend Studios in Long Island, New York
- Genre: Death metal
- Length: 32:51
- Label: JL America
- Producer: Bob Vandermark, Morpheus Descends

Morpheus Descends chronology
Adipocere (1992)	Ritual of Infinity (1992)	Chronicles of the Shadowed Ones (1994)

Professional ratings
Review scores
Source	Rating
Death Metal Underground	Positive
Last Rites	Mixed
Maelstrom	7.5/10 stars
Voices From The Darkside	Very Favorable

Ritual of Infinity is the first studio album by American death metal band Morpheus Descends. It was released in late 1992 through JL America. The album was reissued on compact disc in 2005 through Spanish independent label Xtreem Music along with the entire Adipocere extended play. The Crypt reissued the album (along with the rest of the band's discography) on vinyl for the first time on black, blue, and clear vinyl in 2015. It is the first album by the group to feature vocalist Jeff Riemer as well as their last to include guitarist Steve Hanson.

== Background and recording ==
Tracks from the album were recorded during three separate sessions at Legend Studios, New York in January, April, and September 1992. The tracks "Trephanation" and "Accelerated Decrepitude" are re-recordings of tracks previously released on the Adipocere EP. The tracks "Corpse Under Glass", "Proclaimed Creator," and "Ritual of Infinity" were previously released as a three-track demo tape under the name Corpse Under Glass.

The cover art for the album was done by the artist Brad Moore—who became a fan of the band after he listened to the Corpse Under Glass demo and was asked by bassist Ken Faggio if he could do artwork for the album.

== Release and reception ==
The album initially faced lukewarm reception upon its release. To support the album the band embarked upon a self-financed tour.

The album gets some moderate praise from critics today. Death Metal Underground says that the album has "character and a constant sense of motion in structure that enables continuity to dissonant, postmodern, thunderous music" while also criticizing the album's mixing. Matt Smith of the heavy metal webzine Maelstrom states in his review of the 2005 Xtreem edition of the album: "Ritual of Infinity is a great example of early '90s New York death metal."

== Track listing ==
All tracks are written by Sam Inzerra.

No.	Title	Length
1.	"The Way of All Flesh"	4:37
2.	"Corpse Under Glass"	3:45
3.	"Immortal Coil"	3:44
4.	"Trephanation"	2:57
5.	"Proclaimed Creator"	3:42
6.	"Accelerated Decrepitude"	2:28
7.	"Submerged In Adipocere"	3:20
8.	"Enthralled To Serve"	4:00
9.	"Ritual of Infinity"	3:59
Total length:		32:51

2005 reissue bonus tracks (Adipocere)
No.	Title	Length
10.	"Trephanation"	3:15
11.	"Triformed Limbs"	2:30
12.	"Stigmatic Crucifixion"	3:35
13.	"Residual Kill"	3:00
14.	"Accelerated Decrepitude"	3:02
Total length:		47:49

== Release history ==
Region	Date	Label	Format	Catalog
United States	1992	JL America	CD, CS	3815-41012-2
Spain	2005	Xtreem Music	CD	XM032CD
United States	2015	The Crypt	LP	CRYPT 60

== Personnel ==
Adapted from the Ritual of Infinity liner notes.

- Jeff Riemer – vocals
- Rob Yench – guitar
- Steve Hanson – guitar
- Ken Faggio – bass
- Sam Inzerra – drums, backing vocals ("Corpse Under Glass" and "Immortal Coil")
- Bob Vandermark – production, engineering
- Justin Hossman – engineering
- Brad Moore - cover artwork
