= Disma =

American death metal band

- Origin: Clifton, New Jersey, U.S.
- Genres: Death metal
- Years active: 2005–present
- Labels: Doomentia; Necroharmonic; Profound Lore; Detest
- Members: Craig Pillard; Bill Venner; Chris “Warhead” Demydenko; Randi Stokes
- Past members: Daryl Kahan; Shawn Eldridge; Craig Smilowski
- Website: dismaband.com

Disma is an American death metal band formed in Clifton, New Jersey by guitarists Bill Venner and Daryl Kahan in 2005.

The band drew controversy due to the former lead vocalist Craig Pillard's Nazi sympathies, which have been the theme of albums he has released under the name Sturmfuhrer. The band was removed from the rosters of festivals such as Chaos In Tejas 2012 and Netherlands Deathfest 2015 after other bands threatened to drop off the show due to Disma's presence.

Pillard was ejected from the band in 2019 due to this. The band wrote: "The decision was mutual and the reasons are no secret. We will move on and finish writing the next album and complete it when a suitable replacement is found." Pillard had previously been a member of death metal band Incantation. Pillard has since returned.
