= Sect of Vile Divinities =

Studio album by Incantation
- Released: August 21, 2020
- Studio: Incantation Studios
- Genre: Death metal
- Length: 45:42
- Label: Relapse

Incantation chronology
Profane Nexus (2017)	Sect of Vile Divinities (2020)	Unholy Deification (2023)

Sect of Vile Divinities is the eleventh full-length studio album by the American death metal band Incantation. The album was released on August 21, 2020, through Relapse Records.

== Critical reception ==
Professional ratings
Review scores
Source	Rating
Kerrang	4/5
Brave Words	8.5/10
Exclaim!	6/10
Metal Forces	8/10

The album received generally positive reviews from music critics.

== Recording ==
The album was recorded at Incantation Studios. Engineering was done by Dave Piatek at Recording Services, and by Matthew "Zilla" Draudt, John McEntee and Kyle Severn at Severn Studios. Additional tracking was done by Jamie King Audio, Winston, Winston Salem, North Carolina. Mixing and mastering was done by Dan Swanö at Unisound Studios.

== Track listing ==
No.	Title	Length
1.	"Ritual Impurity (Seven of the Sky Is One)"	3:15
2.	"Propitiation"	4:31
3.	"Entrails of the Hag Queen"	4:33
4.	"Guardians from the Primeval"	2:20
5.	"Black Fathom’s Fire"	3:59
6.	"Ignis Fatuus"	2:23
7.	"Chant of Formless Dread"	2:40
8.	"Shadow-Blade Masters of Tempest and Maelstrom"	4:07
9.	"Scribes of the Stygian"	4:35
10.	"Unborn Ambrosia"	6:03
11.	"Fury’s Manifesto"	2:25
12.	"Siege Hive"	4:51
Total length:		45:42

== Charts ==
Charts	Peak position
U.S. Billboard 200	51

== Personnel ==
All information is derived from the enclosed booklet.

=== Incantation ===
- John McEntee – vocals, rhythm guitar, engineering
- Sonny Lombadozzi – lead guitar
- Chuck Sherwood – bass
- Kyle Severn – drums, engineering

=== Additional personnel ===
- Eliran Kantor – artwork
- Dan Swanö – mixing, mastering
- Jacob Speis - layout
- Scott Kincade - photography
- Kristoff Bates - photography
