= Consecration (band) =

Serbian rock band

- Consecration live in Niš in 2009, from left to right: Danilo Nikodinovski, Nikola Milojević and Nemanja Trećaković

Background information
- Origin: Belgrade, Serbia
- Genres: Sludge metal, post-metal, doom metal, experimental rock, stoner rock, progressive metal
- Years active: 2000–present
- Labels: Active Time, Geenger Records, Redefining Darkness Records
- Members: see the members section
- Website: consecration.bandcamp.com

Consecration is a Serbian rock band from Belgrade. Their unique sound that incorporates elements from various musical genres earned them a growing fan base in the region.

== History ==
The band was formed in 2000 in Belgrade. Over the years the line-up has frequently been in a state of change, ranging all the way from three to six members before finally stabilizing in form of a three-piece band. The only member that was in the founding lineup and still plays in the band is the lead singer/guitarist Danilo Nikodinovski. Their debut album, aux, was recorded in 2006. It consisted of seven tracks that all together last for near an hour. Dissatisfied with the lack of interest by local labels, the band decided to put both aux and the live album entitled live 2nd april 2008 (containing five new tracks at the time) for free download in May 2008. The release of aux was followed by positive local and foreign critics alike, praising the band's will and ability to refresh the dull Serbian heavy music scene. In the meantime, the band's fan base was growing rapidly, making it one of the most popular underground bands in Serbia.

In 2010, the band's second studio album titled .avi was released. This time, the album was released through Geenger Records from Croatia, as once again Serbian record companies failed to make an offer that would interest the band. After the release of .avi, David Lazar Galić, a longtime bassist of the band (and also a founding member of Draconic), left the band due to personal issues and was replaced by Ivan Aranđelović. Consecration's live performances are rated very highly because of the big amount of energy presented on them. They played on several festivals in the region such as EXIT Fest, FENODOM and ARF Festival, along with others. They also performed live with the likes of Neurosis, The Ocean, Block Out, Knut, Hesus Attor, Charon and To/Die/For.

In March 2011, an independent label Prog Sphere Records has released a live EP Consecration in the Temple of the Smoke, which was recorded live on April 2, 2008 in SKC Livingroom, Belgrade. Consecration trio at the time (Danilo Nikodinovski, Nemanja Trećaković and David Lazar Galić) joined forces with three members of a Belgrade's band Temple of the Smoke to record this 20-minutes long EP under the name Consecration & Temple of the Smoke Big Band.

In 2011, the band announced the trilogy of albums, the first being Cimet (released in March 2013), the subsequent Univerzum zna (released in November 2013) and the final part being Grob (released in June 2015). Univerzum zna and Grob were mixed by Aaron Harris (Isis drummer), and all three albums were mastered by James Plotkin.

In early 2022, longtime drummer Matija Dagović suffered a stroke, so Andrej Mladenović stepped in and played a couple of shows with the band. Right around the pre-production for the next album Smrt, ljubav, smrt, Andrej announced he would quit drumming and focus on mixing instead. Danilo Nikodinovski and Ivan Aranđelović being the only members at that point, asked various drummers to record the songs; Aleksandar Maksimović played drums on Delirijum, Marko Kuzmanović on Tvoj osmeh su blajnderi, former drummer Milan Jejina played on Demonska lepota and Andrej Mladenović played on Grozomorno grimizna.

In September 2024 the band released Smrt, ljubav, smrt. The album artwork and some song titles were inspired by Dylan Dog. Smrt, ljubav, smrt incorporated instruments like theremin and fretless bass (Imam) and a female guest vocal (Delirijum). The band liked the energy of a female vocalist so much that the band invited Aleksandra Gegović to join the band as a full time member.

Video sam kako umireš was released in October 2025 as a logical continuation of Smrt, ljubav, smrt. Aleksandar Maksimović was integrated as a full-time drummer and Aleksandra Gegović as a female vocalist, who also played vocoder, talk box and helped Danilo in arranging choral vocals for Buđenje mumije, a 16-minute opening track that also included grand piano, cello, violin, theremin, handpan, tongue drum, ocean drum, chimes, cabalonga shaker, additional floor toms and a triangle. Some tracks such as Među nama showed the cinematic side of the band more than ever, utilizing a trumpet and a flugelhorn with the ocean drum, chimes and heavy use of atmospheric synthesizers that evoked "Vangelis-like feeling, as if Angelo Badalamenti and Miles Davis had a coffee together in 2025". Senke had four different vocalists (three female voices and one male voice) singing in unison during the song's climax.

== Musical style ==
Consecration's sound has a lot of different influences into it. In the aux period, the band stated that their main influences were bands such as Opeth, Katatonia, Anathema, Slowdive and Neurosis, thus being more sludge-oriented. However, on the second, and highly successful studio album (.avi), it is obvious that the band was this time rather more influenced by post-rock/post-metal/ambiental music (the band noted Isis, Sigur Rós, Tool and Godspeed You! Black Emperor as their main influences for the record). And indeed, the second album had more distorted, sludgy riffs with more influences from post rock and post metal, thus being much more ambiental than the previous one. The band is never in a rush to create a feeling, as their songs can last up to fourteen minutes (Đavo nije urban). The lyrics are few, have more meanings attached to them, and are open for personal interpretation. Danilo sings mostly in cleans, although there are growls on most of the songs from aux and the song Idiot Glee from .avi. The bass is usually under various types of distortions on main riffs.

The trilogy of third-to-fifth albums Cimet, Univerzum zna and Grob used different guitar tunings (E standard, drop D or B tuning), while Grob incorporated heavy use of a Moog synthesizer.

Both Smrt, ljubav, smrt and Video sam kako umireš combined both B and E tunings on guitar (sometimes both simultaneously) and both albums had synth instrumentals that were influenced by Aphex Twin and Autechre.

The band nowadays cites Anathema, Godflesh, Swans, Dead Can Dance, David Sylvian, Cocteau Twins and Aphex Twin as their main influences.

== Band members ==
Current:

- Danilo Nikodinovski – vocals, guitar, synth, theremin
- Aleksandra Gegović – vocals, synth, vocoder, talk box, chimes, ocean drum
- Ivan Aranđelović – bass
- Aleksandar Maksimović – drums and percussion

Past:

- Matija Dagović (drums and percussion)
- David Lazar Galić (bass)
- Milan Jejina (drums and percussion)
- Nemanja Trećaković – keyboards, samples and vocoder
- Nikola Milojević (guitar)

== Discography ==
=== Studio albums ===
- Aux (2008)
- .avi (2010)
- Cimet (2013)
- Univerzum zna (2013)
- Grob (2015)
- Plava Laguna (2019)
- Smrt, ljubav, smrt (2024)
- Video sam kako umireš (2025)

=== Live albums ===
- Live 2nd April 2008 (2008)

=== Extended plays ===
- Consecration in the Temple of the Smoke (2011) – as Consecration & Temple of the Smoke Big Band

=== Other appearances ===
- Demo masters 2/3 (Absinthe Thoughts, Aimless, 2005)
- Jutro će promeniti sve - muzika iz serije (Praskozorje, 2018)
