= Primordial Domination =

Studio album by Incantation
- Released: September 5, 2006
- Recorded: Mars Recording Studio, Cleveland, Ohio
- Genre: Death metal
- Length: 40:13
- Label: Megaforce, Listenable
- Producer: Bill Korecky, Incantation

Incantation chronology
| Decimate Christendom (2004) | Primordial Domination (2006) | Vanquish in Vengeance (2012) |

Primordial Domination is the seventh studio album by the American death metal band Incantation. It was released on September 5, 2006.

== Track listing ==
All music by John McEntee and Kyle Severn. All lyrics as noted.

| No. | Title | Writer(s) | Length |
|---|---|---|---|
| 1. | "Primordial Domination" (instrumental) | | 2:54 |
| 2. | "The Fallen Priest" | Severn | 3:34 |
| 3. | "Dissolute Rule/Begin Apocalypse" | Joe Lombard | 3:37 |
| 4. | "Hailed Babylon" | Lombard | 4:22 |
| 5. | "Lead to Desolation" | Lombard | 3:50 |
| 6. | "Doctrines of Reproach" | Lombard | 4:14 |
| 7. | "The Stench of Crucifixion" | McEntee | 6:28 |
| 8. | "Extirpated Dominus" | McEntee | 5:05 |
| 9. | "Conquered God" | Lombard | 6:09 |

== Personnel ==
- John McEntee - guitars, vocals
- Joe Lombard - bass
- Kyle Severn - drums

=== Production ===
- Produced by Bill Korecky & Incantation
- Recorded & mixed by Bill Korecky at Mars Recording Compound
- Mastered by Alan Douches & Kim Dumas at West West Side Music
