= Funerus =

American death metal band

- Origin: Johnstown, PA
- Genres: Death metal
- Years active: 1990–1994, 2002–present
- Labels: Ibex Moon Records
- Members: John McEntee; Barry Mull; Pat Carroll
- Past members: Jason Faust; Brad Heiple; Kyle Severn; Sam Inzerra; Jill McEntee
- Website: http://www.funerus.com

Funerus is an American death metal band from Johnstown, Pennsylvania, that was originally formed in 1990. The band is a current death metal side project of John McEntee of Incantation and his now ex-wife Jill. Funerus has released two full-length studio albums on Ibex Moon Records.

Jill McEntee died in August 2025.

== Band members ==
=== Current ===
- John McEntee – guitar (2002–present)
- Barry Mull – guitar (2015–present)
- Pat Carroll – drums (2015–present)

=== Former ===
- Jill McEntee – bass (1993–1994, 2002–2025; her death), lead vocals (2004–2025; her death)
- Jason Foust – drums (1990–1994)
- Brad Heiple – lead vocals, guitars (1990–1994; 2002–2004), Bass (1990–1993)
- Kyle Severn – drums (2002–2009)
- Sam Inzerra – drums (2009–2014)

== Discography ==
=== Studio albums ===
- Festering Earth (2003)
- Reduced to Sludge (2011)

=== EPs ===
- The Black Death (2015)
