= Comatose Music =

Independent extreme metal record label

- Founded: 2001
- Founder: Steve Green
- Genre: Extreme metal
- Location: North Carolina
- Official website: comatosemusic.com

Comatose Music is an independent extreme metal record label founded by Steve Green in 2001. The label is primarily focused on bands of the brutal death metal variety with lyrics centered on gore topics, though bands in the thrash, black and grindcore genres have also been signed. They have released albums by acts such as Pathology, Horrific Demise, Skam, Aborted Fetus, Kraanium, Embludgeonment, Strappado, Dehumanized, and Mortal Decay.

== History ==
The label was originally established as a hobby while Green was playing in a band called Lust of Decay, which was active from 2002 through 2006. Green is also involved with the band Atrocious Abnormality.

== See also ==
- Hells Headbangers Records
- Transcending Obscurity Records
- Redefining Darkness Records
