= Profanatica =

American black metal band

- Origin: New Paltz, New York, U.S.
- Genres: Black metal, blackened death metal
- Years active: 1990–1992; 2001–present
- Labels: After World, Osmose, Hells Headbangers
- Spinoff of: Incantation
- Members: Paul Ledney; Adam Besserer; Alletta Ergun
- Past members: See below

Profanatica is a black metal band from New York that moved to Connecticut. They are one of the first black metal bands from the United States (alongside Von, formed in 1987), and a major, early band from the second wave of black metal. Led by Paul Ledney, they emphasize blasphemous themes.

== History ==
=== Initial formation (1990–1992) ===
After the founding members of death metal band Incantation split due to artistic differences, Paul Ledney, Aragon Amori, and Brett Makowski adopted the name Profanatica while John McEntee continued as Incantation. In an interview, Ledney implied that he did not recognise McEntee's Incantation, and he claimed that he, Amori, and Makowski proposed the name. He also claimed that McEntee was reluctant to pursue black metal, corpse paint, and blasphemy. Both parties are on good terms and have often collaborated.

In the summer of 1990, they released their first demo, Putrescence Of..., followed by Broken Throne of Christ in December. Makowski was unable to participate in the recording of the latter demo, so the band recruited John Gelso to play guitar. The band signed with After World Records, and, in 1991, they released the 7-inch EP Weeping in Heaven, limited to 500 hand-numbered copies. Following this EP, After World re-released it on cassette with two bonus live tracks the next year. Also in 1992, the band signed with Osmose Productions to release a second EP, which was a split 12-inch with Colombian band Masacre.

During this time, Profanatica toured their blasphemous live act around the northeastern United States. Toward the end of the year, Makowski and Gelso left the band. Ledney and Amori recruited Robert 'Wicked Warlock' Crusen of Demoncy to play guitar. The three played one show, and planned to participate in an American black metal festival that Halloween, with bands such as Order from Chaos, Vital Remains, and Acheron. This did not took place.

The band recorded an album alternately known as The Raping of the Virgin Mary, and Sodomy of Sacred Assholes. According to Ledney, Amori and Crusen destroyed the master tapes. The band broke up soon after. Following the end of Profanatica, Ledney formed Havohej. Although Profanatica disbanded, several official records were released.

=== Reunion ===
In early 2001, Ledney reformed Profanatica with two new members . They released their first full-length album, Profanatitas de Domonatia, in 2007 on Hells Headbangers Records, the label that would release and distribute most of their titles for the next decade. In late 2007, Ledney announced that Profanatica and Havohej were back, and that Profanatica would headline the Sacrifice of the Nazarene Child Fest Texas the following summer. On August 16, 2010, Profanatica released its second full-length album, Disgusting Blasphemies Against God. On November 26, 2013, Profanatica released their third full-length studio album, Thy Kingdom Cum. Profanatica released their fourth album, The Curling Flame of Blasphemy, on July 22, 2016. In 2016, guitarist and bassist John Gelso left the band and was replaced with Ryan Adams. The band released the EP Altar of the Virgin Whore on November 2, 2018. The band signed with Season of Mist and released their debut with the label, Rotting Incarnation of God, on October 11, 2019. The band maintained their relationship with Hells Headbangers, through which they released the EPs Pale Fuck in 2022 and Wreathed in Dead Angels in 2025. Profanatica's sixth full-length and second with Season of Mist, Crux Simplex, came out on September 22, 2023.

== Musical style and ideology ==
Profanatica's music is influenced by Possessed, old Venom, old Bathory, Hellhammer, Necrovore, and Sarcófago, and is close to death metal. According to both Proscriptor and Tony Laureano, they are among the first American black metal bands, although Laureano considers them to be death metal.

In various interviews, Ledney has been critical of prominent early Norwegian black metal bands such as Mayhem, Burzum, and Gorgoroth. He considers American black metal to be stylistically distinct from European black metal, and disparages the European style for lacking death metal and punk influences. Ledney has also expressed his dislike for quiet bass and one-man bands, calling them "lame."

== Lineup ==
=== Current lineup ===
- Paul Ledney – drums, vocals (1990–1992, 2001–present)
- Adam Besserer – guitars (2018–present)
- Alletta Ergun – bass (2024–present)

=== Former members ===
Guitars:

- Brett Makowski (1990–1992)
- Rod Ware (2001–2006)
- John Gelso (1990–1992, 2006–2016)
- Ryan Adams (2016–2018)

Bass:

- Aragon Amori (1990–1992; died 1996)
- Robert 'Wicked Warlock' Crusen (1992)
- Malcolm Tent (2001–2006, 2023–2024)
- Alex Cox (2006–2018)
- Richard Olseen (2018–2020)
- Pat Davies (2020–2024)

== Discography ==
=== Albums ===
- Profanatitas de Domonatia (2007)
- Disgusting Blasphemies Against God (2010)
- Thy Kingdom Cum (2013)
- The Curling Flame of Blasphemy (2016)
- Rotting Incarnation of Christ (2019)
- Crux Simplex (2023)

=== Compilations ===
- Profanatica – Live (2000)
- The Enemy of Virtue (2006)
- Sickened by Holy Host (The Grand Masters Session) (2012)
- Black Cum over Italy - Live (2025)

=== EPs ===
- Weeping in Heaven (1991)
- Altar of the Virgin Whore (2018)
- Pale Fuck (2022)
- Wreathed in Dead Angels (2025)

=== Singles ===
- Broken Jew (2002)

=== Demos ===
- Official Rehearsal Tape (1990)
- Putrescence Of... (re-released in 1993 as As Tears of Blood Stain the Altar of Christ) (1990)
- Broken Throne of Christ (1990)

=== Splits ===
- Ola de Violencia/Tormenting Holy Flesh (with Masacre, 1992)
- Unholy Masters of Darkness (with Impiety, 1999)
- Trampling the Holy Faith (with Goatsodomy, Nuclear Desecration and Unholy Crucifix, 2008)

=== DVDs ===
- The Enemy of Virtue (2008)
