= Morpheus Descends =

American death metal band

- Also known as: Morpheus
- Origin: Middletown, New York, U.S.
- Genre: Death metal
- Years active: 1990–1998, 2013–present
- Labels: Dark Descent, Angel Dust, JL America, Seraphic Decay
- Members: Rob Yench; Sam Inzerra; Ken Faggio; Tim Rocheny; Adam Kegg
- Past members: Andy Newton; Tom Stevens; Bryan Johnston; Jeff Riemer; Steve Hanson; Craig Campbell

Morpheus Descends is a death metal band formed in Middletown, New York, in 1990 as Morpheus. The band has undergone numerous lineup changes. Their core lineup consists of founding members Rob Yench and Sam Inzerra. The group broke up in 1998 due to a lack of interest. They reunited in 2013 and continued to play live shows. Morpheus Descends is considered an important band in the New York death metal scene.

== History ==
=== Initial run (1990–1998) ===
The band first rehearsed on October 31, 1990, with the lineup of bassist Ken Faggio, drummer Sam Inzerra, vocalist Craig Campbell, and guitarists Rob Yench and Steve Hanson. Before forming Morpheus Descends (at this point called Morpheus, inspired by the comic Sandman), Faggio and Yench were in the band Volatile Zylog, while Campbell, Hanson and Inzerra were in the band Infectious Waste. The two bands played a show together the previous summer. The band's early influences included Napalm Death, Black Sabbath, Death, and Morbid Angel. The band recorded their first demo tape, Accelerated Decrepitude, in 1991. It contained tracks that would be rereleased as a 7" record under the title Adipocere in 1992 through Seraphic Decay Records.

The group signed to JL America in 1992 and released their first full-length album, Ritual of Infinity, the same year. Featuring tracks recorded during different sessions, the album was released under the band name Morpheus Descends—the first recording under that name. It was the first recording by the group to feature vocalist Jeff Riemer, who joined the group after Campbell left. According to Yench, JL America requested the name change, since an electronic group named Morpheus already existed. The band self-financed and booked the tour for the album.

The group self-released the EP Chronicles of the Shadowed Ones in 1994, which Yench described as "much darker and more doom-laden." The band spent extra studio time on this recording, instead of the "rushed" schedule of their previous recordings. Chronicles of the Shadowed Ones is the group's only release to feature guitarist Bryan Johnston, who replaced Steve Hanson when he left the group after the release of Ritual of Infinity. It is the group's last album to feature vocalist Jeff Riemer. The group issued their third extended play, The Horror of the Truth, in 1997, through Angel Dust Records, the only release by the group to feature vocalist/guitarist Tom Stevens and bassist Andy Newton. The group broke up in 1998 due to creative differences, personal issues, and lack of interest.

=== Post-breakup activity (1998–2012) ===
After the band's break-up in 1998, the members worked on other projects. Stevens and Yench performed in Incantation. Yench is a member of Mausoleum, Typhus, and Engorge. Inzerra plays in the bands Mortician and Funerus and was once a member of crossover thrash group Generation Kill. Faggio plays in Rooms of Ruin and Cabal 34. Andy Newton joined black metal band Fog under the nickname "Lord Typhus Mirinor."

Former vocalist Jeff Riemer died on August 30, 2005, of a heroin overdose.

=== Reunion (2013–present) ===
The band performed their first show since their break-up in 1998, with founding members Yench, Inzerra, Faggio, and Campbell, and new guitarist Ed Winners, in 2013. The idea to reunite had lingered since their initial dissolution. It was until 2012, when Inzerra and Yench met at Maryland Deathfest, that they took the idea seriously. To celebrate the band's 25th anniversary in 2015, Dark Descent Records released the three-disc anthology box set From Blackened Crypts, which contained the band's entire discography, the DVD Visage of Malady with live footage and interviews, and two new tracks, "Oozing of the Urn" and "The King's Curse," also released as a separate 7" record that same year under the same name. Webzine Metal Rules named From Blackened Crypts the best box set of 2015. Death Metal Underground's "Best Albums of 2015" feature mentioned the 7".

The group has toured regularly since their reunion, and has announced plans to write and record new material in the future.

== Band members ==
=== Current members ===
- Tim Rocheny – vocals (2015–present)
- Rob Yench – guitar (1990–1998, 2013–present)
- Ken Faggio – bass (1990–1993, 2013–present)
- Adam Kegg – guitar (2015–present)
- Sam Inzerra – drums (1990–1998, 2013–present)

=== Former members ===
- Craig Campbell – vocals (1990–1991, 2013–2015)
- Ed Winter – guitar (2014–2015)
- Tom Stevens – guitar, vocals (1995–1998)
- Andy Newton – bass (1993–1998)
- Bryan Johnston – guitar (1993–1995) (died 2025)
- Jeff Riemer – vocals (1992–1995) (died 2005)
- Steve Hanson – guitar (1990–1993)

== Discography ==
=== Studio albums ===
- Ritual of Infinity (1992)

=== Extended plays ===
- Adipocere (1992)
- Chronicles of the Shadowed Ones (1994)
- The Horror of the Truth (1997)
- From Blackened Crypts (2015)

=== Box sets ===
- From Blackened Crypts (2015)

=== Demo albums ===
- Accelerated Decrepitude (1991)
- Corpse Under Glass (1992)
- Cairn of Dumitru (1993)
