= .avi (album) =

Studio album by Consecration
- Released: 29 March 2010
- Recorded: Studio Underground, Belgrade, Serbia
- Genre: Experimental rock; post-metal; post-rock; doom metal; sludge Metal; ambient
- Length: 56:44
- Label: Geenger Records (Croatia)
- Producer: Marko Jovanović; Consecration

Consecration chronology
aux (2008)	.avi (2010)

.avi is the second studio album by the Serbian experimental band Consecration. The album received a string of positive reviews from all over the Balkans region and Europe, which increased the band's popularity further.

== Reception ==
Professional ratings
Review scores
Source	Rating
Metal Sound	10/10 stars
Popboks	7/10 stars
Pot Lista	favorable
Trablmejker	favorable
Cmar-net	9/10 stars
Metalblaze	4/5 stars
Stalker Magazine	7/10 stars
Muzika.hr	4/5 stars
MindOverMetal	5/5 stars

Apart from the very positive reviews by other European reviewers, the album was critically very positively acclaimed by reviewers from Serbia, Croatia and other countries in the former Yugoslavia region. Nenad Milosavljević from Popboks gave 7/10 stars for this album with the comment that .avi "presents a release whose echo could very easily go overseas, over boundaries of the autistic miniature scene they belong to". Slobodan Trifunović from Metal Sound gave the album ten out of ten stars, saying that the album "is one beautiful piece of music, well rounded work of experienced musicians and it will for sure go down in history as one of the best releases of harder music in Serbia". Croatian Cmar-net awarded the album with the rating of 9/10, praising the album as one of the most refreshing releases in past couple of years. Later on, Popboks announced that Consecration's .avi is the Serbian Album of The Year 2010, as voted by the jury.

== Track listing ==
All tracks are written and performed by Consecration.

1. "Aligator" – 8:30
2. ".avi" – 13:56
3. "Cisterna" – 1:07
4. "Somna" – 7:29
5. "Idiot Glee" – 11:25
6. "Đavo nije urban" – 14:17

== Personnel ==
Consecration:

- Matija Dagović – Drums and Percussion
- David Lazar Galić – Bass
- Danilo Nikodinovski – Vocals and Guitar
- Nikola Milojević – Guitar
- Nemanja Trećaković – Keyboards, Samples

Other:

- Marko Jovanović – Recording/Production
- Aleksandar Zec – Photography
- Stojan Reljić – Guitar on "Cisterna"
- Milutin Jovančić – Backing vocals on "Somna"
- Jelena Stanićević – Backing vocals on "Idiot Glee"
