= Decimate Christendom =

Studio album by Incantation
- Released: July 27, 2004
- Recorded: March 2004
- Studios: Excello Recording Studios, New York City
- Genre: Death metal
- Length: 43:43
- Label: Olympic
- Producers: Bill Korecky; Incantation

Incantation chronology
Blasphemy (2002)	Decimate Christendom (2004)	Primordial Domination (2006)

Professional ratings
Review scores
Source	Rating
AllMusic	3/5 stars
Scream Magazine	5/6 stars

Decimate Christendom is the sixth studio album by American death metal band Incantation, released on July 27, 2004, by Olympic Recordings. A music video was made for the song "Dying Divinity". This is the first Incantation album to feature lead guitarist John McEntee on vocals, a role he continues to fill.

== Track listing ==
No.	Title	Writer(s)	Length
1.	"Decimate Christendom"	Joe Lombard	3:08
2.	"Dying Divinity"	Lombard	2:59
3.	"Oath of Armageddon"	John McEntee	5:26
4.	"Blaspheme the Sacraments"	Lombard	5:22
5.	"Merciless Tyranny"	McEntee	3:30
6.	"Horns of Eradication"	Lombard	5:21
7.	"Unholy Enpowerment of Righteous Deprivation"		1:05
8.	"Thorns of Everlasting Persecution"	Lombard	3:50
9.	"No Paradise Awaits"	Kyle Severn	4:42
10.	"Eternal Darkness Under Conquered Skies"		1:42
11.	"Feeble Existence"	Lombard	6:38

== Personnel ==
- John McEntee – guitars, vocals
- Joe Lombard – bass
- Kyle Severn – drums

=== Production ===
- Produced & engineered by Bill Korecky
- Mixed by John McEntee & Bill Korecky
- Mastered by Scott Hull
