= The Infernal Storm =

Studio album by Incantation
- Released: May 9, 2000
- Recorded: November–December 1999
- Studio: Mars Recording Compound, Cleveland
- Genre: Death metal
- Length: 39:54
- Label: Relapse
- Producer: Bill Korecky; Incantation; Matthew F. Jacobson (exec.)

Incantation chronology
Diabolical Conquest (1998)	The Infernal Storm (2000)	Blasphemy (2002)

The Infernal Storm is the fourth studio album by American death metal band Incantation, released on May 9, 2000 by Relapse Records. This is the only album to feature vocalist Mike Saez as a full band member, as he was a session vocalist on Blasphemy.

Chronicles of Chaos rated the album eight out of ten.

== Track listing ==
No.	Title	Length
1.	"Anoint the Chosen"	3:53
2.	"Extinguishing salvation"	4:07
3.	"Impetuous Rage"	5:03
4.	"Sempiternal Pandemonium"	6:18
5.	"Lustful Demise"	5:14
6.	"Heaven Departed"	7:32
7.	"Apocalyptic Destroyer of Angels"	3:19
8.	"Nocturnal Kingdom of Demonic Enlightenment"	4:28

== Lineup ==
- Mike Saez – guitars, vocals
- John McEntee – guitars
- Dave Culross – drums
- Rob Yench – bass
