= Incantation (American band) =

American death metal band

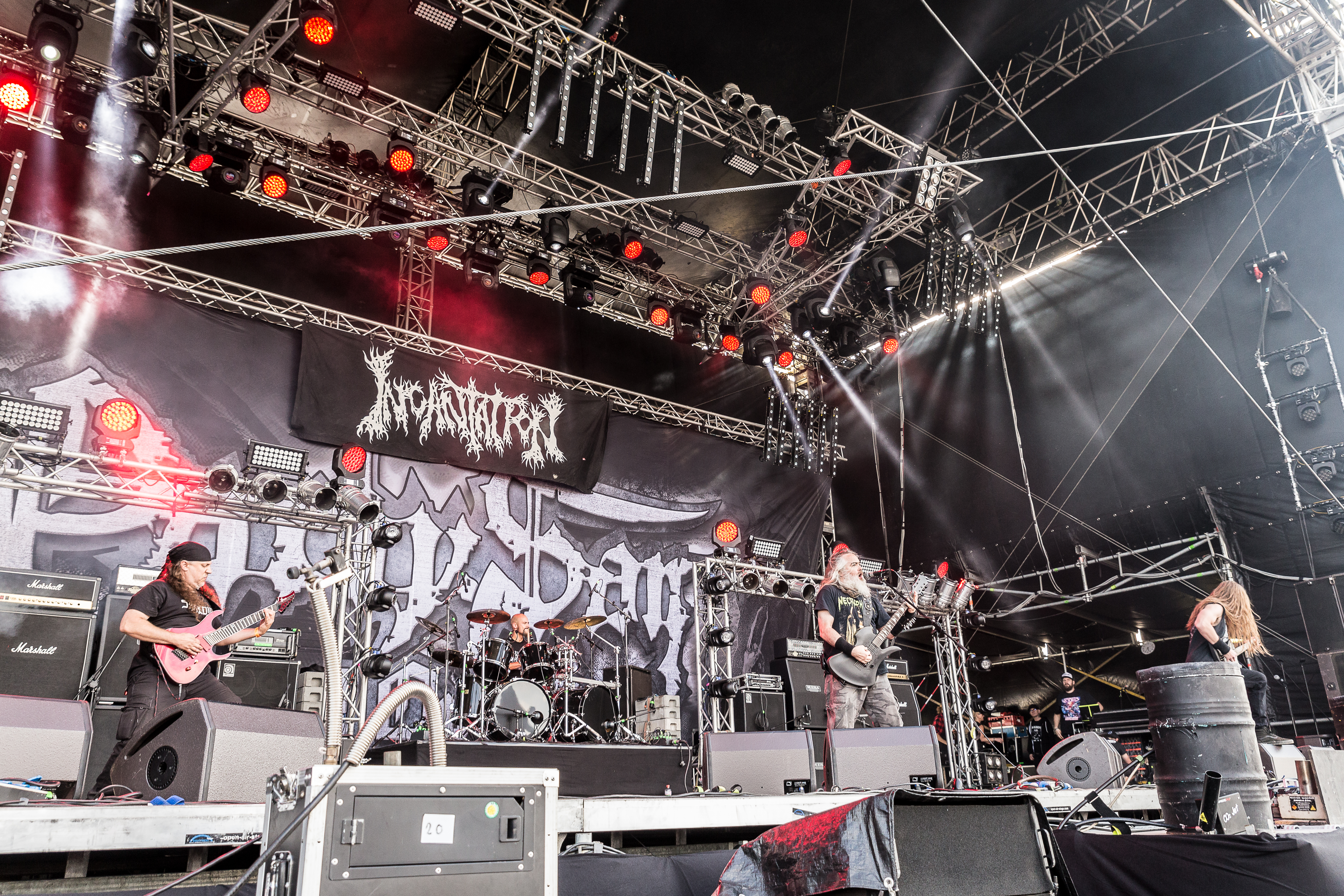
- Incantation performing in 2019

Background information
- Origin: Fairlawn, New Jersey, U.S.
- Genres: Death metal; death-doom; blackened death metal (early)
- Years active: 1989–present
- Labels: Seraphic Decay; Relapse; Necropolis; Olympic; Listenable; Ibex Moon
- Spinoffs: Profanatica; Disma
- Members: John McEntee; Chuck Sherwood; Kyle Severn; Luke Shively
- Past members: Past members
- Website: incantation.com

Incantation is an American death metal band formed by John McEntee and Paul Ledney in 1989. Despite the band's members residing in Johnstown, Pennsylvania, Incantation are considered leaders in the New York City death metal scene with Suffocation, Mortician and Immolation.

To date, the band has released twelve full-length albums, two live albums, four EPs, two singles, three split-EPs, one DVD, and three demos. Their most recent album, Unholy Deification, was released through Relapse Records in August 2023. The band have maintained a cult following and underground popularity since the '90s.

Guitarist and vocalist John McEntee is the sole continuous member of Incantation, though drummer Kyle Severn has appeared on every studio album since their third full-length, Diabolical Conquest.

== History ==
Paul Ledney (drums and vocals), Aragon Amori (bass), Brett Makowski (rhythm guitar) and John McEntee (lead guitar) formed Incantation in August 1989. McEntee previously played in the thrash metal band Revenant. In 1990, disagreements about black metal elements, corpse paint and blasphemous lyrics led Ledney, Amori and Makowski to depart the band and formed black metal Profanatica.

Incantation came to prominence with Onward to Golgotha and Mortal Throne of Nazarene, both of which feature singer Craig Pillard. Following the release of the Forsaken Mourning of Angelic Anguish EP in 1997, Pillard departed the band and was replaced with Daniel Corchado of The Chasm. Corchado performed on 1998's Diabolical Conquest before leaving the band. Vocalist Mike Saez performed on the two following albums, The Infernal Storm (2000) and Blasphemy (2002). McEntee has been the singer since Decimate Christendom.

After leaving Incantation, Pillard joined New Jersey death metal act Disma in 2008, from which he was fired in 2019 due to allegations of Nazi sympathies. The members of Incantation distanced themselves from their prior association with him, claiming they had no knowledge of his political leanings until two years after he had left the band.

In February 2016, Incanation toured the US with Swedish black metal band Marduk. They toured with Marduk again the following year, bringing along American death metal band Abysmal Dawn. In 2019, Incantation supported Morbid Angel on tour in the US along with Swedish black metal band Watain.

Incantation performed at Milwaukee Metal Fest in June 2024. The band supported Belphegor on their US tour in the winter of 2026 along with Hate and Narcotic Waste. During this tour, they stated that they did not always have food. Fans donated dry goods and nonperishable food to the band, which the band donated to food drives. In March, they co-headlined the first Shamrock Slaughter festival in Fort Wayne, Indiana with Sanguisugabogg. They were scheduled to return to Milwaukee Metal Fest in June 2026.

== Musical style and influences ==
Thom Jurek of AllMusic described Incantation's sound as "ferocious" and "mercilessly brutal," and categorized the band's style as a fusion of death metal, black metal, and grindcore. He added that the band utilizes "punishing" guitar riffs and "widely varying tempos." Incantation has also been noted for elements of doom metal present in their music. The band often employs slow and down-tuned passages, similar to the death-doom style of bands like Autopsy. Additionally, many of the band's riffs use string bending and pinch harmonics to attack single-string melody lines, drawing comparisons to Immolation. In an interview with Revolver, guitarist and vocalist John McEntee said: "We always said that the riff itself isn’t important, it’s the feeling you get when you hear the riff."

Incantation's lyrical content frequently draws on anti-Christian, Satanic, and occult themes.

The band has cited Venom, Possessed, Destruction, Sepultura, Celtic Frost, Kreator, Sarcófago, Necrovore, Necrophagia and Master as influences.

== Legacy ==
Incantation are considered leaders in the New York City death metal scene along with Suffocation, Mortician and Immolation. Incantation are also considered to be highly influential on a range of later death metal bands including Dead Congregation, Grave Miasma, and Portal, who are often described as "cavernous death metal."

In 2017, Vice wrote: "In a genre that values loyalty to principle and a dedication to extremity, Incantation might be the truest death metal band on the planet."

Frontman John McEntee spoke of the band's influence in a 2023 interview with New Noise Magazine: "We really wanted to push the limits of death metal at a time when I didn’t realize that, one day, it would be its own thing. I just always thought it would just be kind of us doing us, you know? And now I hear other bands; they really capture that style that we play, especially early on. And it’s super cool to hear that."

== Band members ==
Current official members

- John McEntee — lead and rhythm guitars (1989–present), vocals (2003–present)
- Kyle Severn — drums (1994–1998, 2000–2007, 2009–present)
- Chuck Sherwood — bass (2008–present; not touring since 2015)
- Luke Shively — lead and rhythm guitars (2019–present), bass (2015–2019, touring only)

Former official members

- Paul Ledney — vocals, drums (1989–1990)
- Brett Makowski — rhythm guitar (1989–1990)
- Aragon Amori — bass (1989–1990; died 1996)
- Ronnie Deo — bass (1990–1992; died 2022)
- Will Rahmer — vocals (1990, 1995–1996)
- Sal Seijo — rhythm guitar (1990)
- Peter Barnevic — drums (1990)
- Jim Roe — drums (1990–1993, 1994, 2007–2008)
- Bill Venner — rhythm guitar (1990)
- Craig Pillard — vocals, rhythm guitar (1990–1994, 1997, 2008)
- Dan Kamp — bass (1992–1993)
- Dave Niedrist — bass (1993–1994)
- John Brody — drums (1993–1994)
- Duane Morris — vocals, rhythm guitar (1994–1995)
- Randy Scott — bass (1994)
- Mike Donnelly — bass (1995)
- Daniel Corchado — vocals (1995, 1997–1998), rhythm guitar (1995), bass (1997–1998)
- Mike Saez — rhythm guitar (1995–1996, 1997, 1999–2001), vocals (1999–2001)
- Mary Ciullo — bass (1995–1996)
- Kevin Hughes — bass (1996–1997)
- Nathan Rossi — vocals, rhythm guitar (1996; died 2024)
- Rob Yench — bass (1997–2001)
- Tom Stevens — vocals, rhythm guitar (1998–1999)
- Clay Lytle — drums (1998)
- Rick "Slim" Boast — drums (1999)
- Joe "Fingers" Lombard — bass (2001–2006; died 2012)
- Lou "Sonny" Lombardozzi — lead and rhythm guitars (2003, 2014–2019)
- Alex Bouks — bass (2007), lead and rhythm guitars (2008–2014)

== Discography ==
=== Studio albums ===
- Onward to Golgotha (1992)
- Mortal Throne of Nazarene (1994)
- Diabolical Conquest (1998)
- The Infernal Storm (2000)
- Blasphemy (2002)
- Decimate Christendom (2004)
- Primordial Domination (2006)
- Vanquish in Vengeance (2012)
- Dirges of Elysium (2014)
- Profane Nexus (2017)
- Sect of Vile Divinities (2020)
- Unholy Deification (2023)

=== Compilation albums ===
- XXV (2016)
- Unholy Massacre (2016)
- Tricennial of Blasphemy (2022)

=== Rough Mix albums ===
- Upon the Throne of Apocalypse (1995)
- Blasphemous Cremation (2008)

=== EPs ===
- Entrantment of Evil (1990)
- Deliverance of Horrific Prophecies (1991)
- The Forsaken Mourning of Angelic Anguish (1997)
- Blasphemous Cremation (2008)

=== Singles ===
- "Thieves of the Cloth" (2006)
- "Scapegoat" (2010)
- "Degeneration" (2012)

=== Splits ===
- Relapse Singles Series Vol.1 (2002)
- Relapse Singles Series Vol.3 (2004)
- Afterparty Massacre (2011)
- Reh & Live 1990 / Jesus Spawn (2013)

=== Live albums ===
- Tribute to the Goat (1997)
- Live Blasphemy in Brazil Tour 2001 (2001)
- Rotting Spiritual Embodiment (2017)

== Bibliography ==
- Purcell, Natalie J. (2003). Death Metal Music: The Passion and Politics of a Subculture. McFarland & Company. ISBN 978-0-7864-1585-4.
