= Transcending Obscurity Records =

Independent extreme metal record label

- Founded: 2005
- Founder: Kunal Choksi
- Genre: Extreme metal
- Location: India
- Official website: tometal.com

Transcending Obscurity Records is an Indian independent extreme metal record label, founded in 2005 by Kunal Choksi. The label signs bands of the black metal, death metal, doom, sludge, thrash, and avant-garde varieties. Many of the label's artists are international acts. They have signed acts such as Chaos, Norse and Albatross. They also operate an animal sanctuary.

== See also ==
- Hells Headbangers Records
- Redefining Darkness Records
- Comatose Music
- Satanath Records
