= The Chasm (band) =

Death metal band

- Origin: Mexico City, Mexico
- Genres: Death metal
- Years active: 1992–present
- Label: Lux Inframundis
- Members: Daniel Corchado; Antonio Leon
- Past members: Julio Viterbo; Erick Diaz; Luis Martinez; Luis Antonio Ramos; Rodolfo Riveron; Roberto Valle; Alfonso Polo
- Website: www.enterthedeathcult.com

The Chasm is a death metal band from Mexico City that currently resides in Chicago. They have been described as one of Mexico's most respected metal bands. The band was formed by singer/guitarist/bassist Daniel Corchado in 1992, after he left another early Mexican metal band, Cenotaph. Corchado and drummer Antonio Leon have been the band's only constant members.

They released their first album in 1994. While an underground act in many countries, they found popularity in Latin America and Europe, and reached wider audiences after signing with UK-based Earache Records. They are known for death metal but are also influenced by thrash metal, black metal, progressive metal, and doom metal.

== Musical style ==
The Chasm combines death metal with melodic and progressive structures. Their style is often described as dark, atmospheric, and rooted in mysticism. Unlike many traditional death metal bands, The Chasm oemphasizes long instrumental passages and complex arrangements. The band's lyrics explore metaphysical themes, death, and the occult. Early works were closer to old school death metal, while later albums developed a more progressive and expansive approach. Critics have compared their sound to Immolation and Morbid Angel, but with a distinctive melodic sense that has given them a cult status in the underground scene.

== Band members ==
=== Current members ===
- Daniel Corchado - vocals, guitar, bass (1992 - )
- Antonio Leon - drums (1992 - )

=== Session members ===
- George Velaetis - bass (2003, 2005, 2006)
- Roberto Lizarraga (2005)

=== Former members ===
- Erick Diaz-Soto - guitar (1992–1993, 1994–1997)
- Luis Martinez - bass (1992–1994)
- Luis Antonio Ramos - guitar (1993–1994)
- Rodolfo Riveron - bass (1994)
- Roberto Valle - bass (1999)
- Alfonso Polo - bass (2000–2003)
- Julio Viterbo (1998-2013)

== Discography ==
- Procreation of the Inner Temple (1994)
- From The Lost Years (1995)
- Deathcult For Eternity: The Triumph (1998)
- Procession To The Infraworld (2000)
- Reaching The Veil of Death (EP) (2001)
- Conjuration of the Spectral Empire (2002)
- The Spell of Retribution (2004)
- Farseeing the Paranormal Abysm (2009)
- A Conscious Creation from the Isolated Domain-Phase I (2017)
- The Scars of a Lost Reflective Shadow (2022)
