= John McEntee (musician) =

American musician

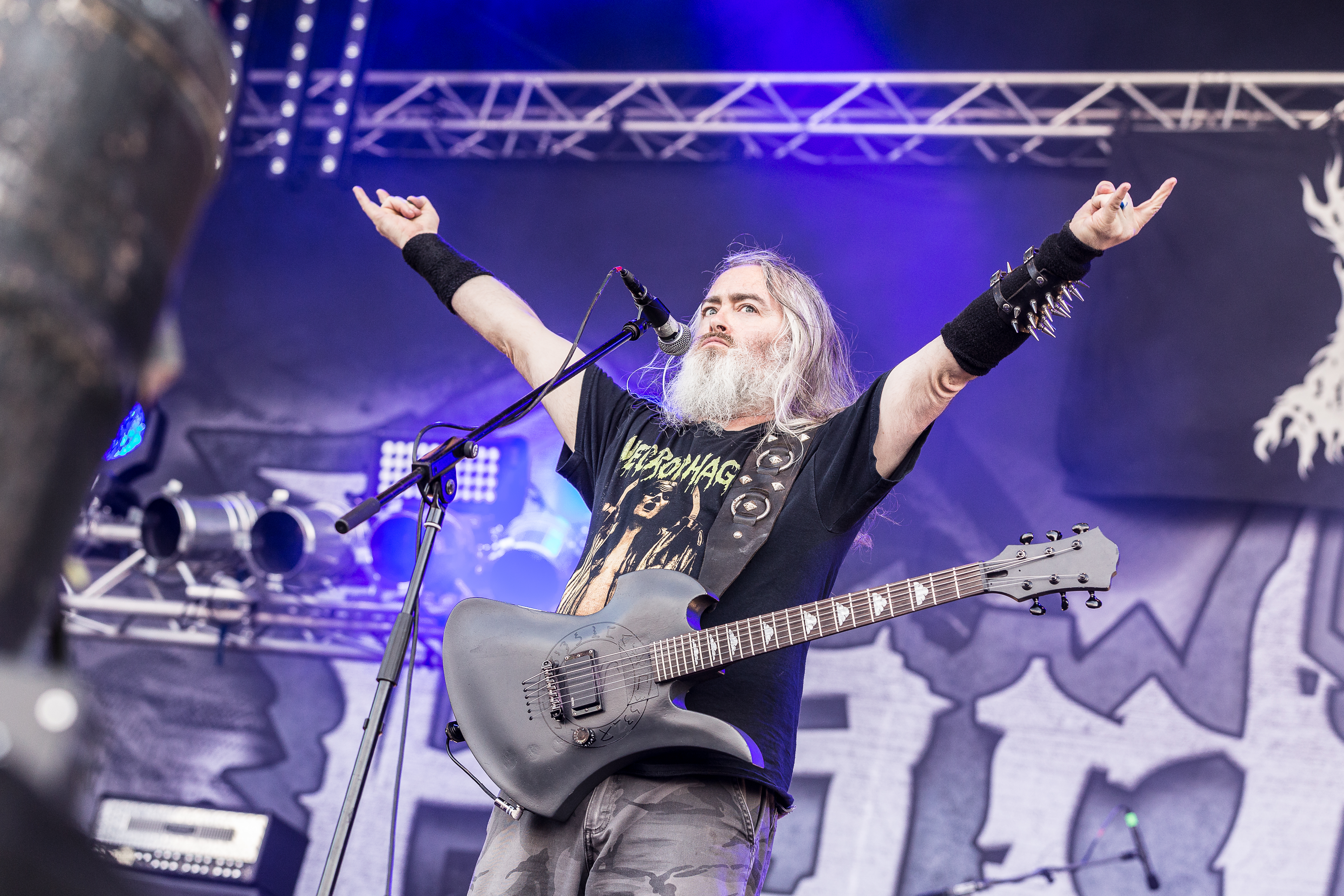
- McEntee performing with Incantation in 2019

Background information
- Born: John McEntee; December 18, 1969 (age 56); Fair Lawn, New Jersey, United States
- Genres: Death metal; death-doom
- Occupations: Guitarist; vocalist
- Years active: 1989-present
- Member of: Incantation

John McEntee is an American death metal musician, best known as the guitarist, lead vocalist and sole constant member of Incantation.Originally solely the lead guitarist of Incantation, he took on lead vocal duties, starting with their sixth studio album Decimate Christendom.

Before Incantation, McEntee performed in a band called Revenant. He performed vocals on the final Necrophagia album Moribundis Grim after their vocalist died in 2018.
