= Eliran Kantor =

Israeli artist

- אלירן קנטור
- Born: 13 September 1984 (age 42)
- Occupations: Artist, illustrator
- Known for: Creating album covers for metal bands

Eliran Kantor (Hebrew: אלירן קנטור; born 13 September 1984) is a Berlin-based Israeli artist and illustrator known mostly for creating album covers for metal bands such as Thy Art Is Murder, Despised Icon, Testament, Soulfly, Helloween and My Dying Bride.

== Album cover illustration credits ==
- Solitary – Trail of Omission (independent release, 2004)
- Armilos – Race of Lies (independent release, 2004)
- Bishop of Hexen – The Nightmarish Compositions (SPV/CCP, 2005)
- To-Mera – Transcendental (Candlelight, 2005)
- Dred – A Pathway to Extinction (independent release, 2005)
- Abused Romance – Abused Romance (independent release, 2005)
- Abed – The Coming of Soon (independent release, 2005)
- Aghora – Formless (American edition) (Dobles Music, 2006)
- Sickening Horror – When Landscapes Bleed Backwards (Neurotic, 2006)
- Savannah – Savannah (independent release, 2007)
- Mekong Delta – Lurking Fear (AFM/Candlelight, 2007)
- Dissonant – Perspective (independent release, 2007)
- Denis Vlachiotis – Imperishable Ferocity (independent release, 2007)
- Detonation – Emission Phase (Osmose, 2007)
- The Old Dead Tree – The Water Fields (Season of Mist, 2007)
- Thrustor – Night of Fire (Black Bastola Records, 2007)
- Mena Brinno – Icy Muse (Dark Balance Records, 2007)
- sHeavy – The Machine That Won the War (Candlelight, 2007)
- Liberty N' Justice – 4 All: The best of LNJ (Versallis, 2007)
- Sorrow's Joy – Fallow Ground (independent release, 2008)
- Grant O'neil – Head-On (independent release, 2008)
- Abysmalia – Portals to Psychotic Inertia (independent release, 2008)
- Prey for Nothing – Violence Divine (Rusty Cage, 2008)
- Robot Lords of Tokyo – II: Whiskey, Blood & Napalm (independent release, 2008)
- Masachist – Death March Fury (TBA, 2008)
- Thy Majestie – Dawn (Dark Balance, 2008)
- Xerath – Xerath I (promotional demo, 2008)
- Desolation – Lexicon V (Shadowflame, 2008)
- Deceiver – Thrashing Heavy Metal (Pulverised, 2008)
- Ansur – Warring Factions (Candlelight/Nocturnal Art, 2008)
- Baliset – A Time for Rust (Ret-Con, 2008)
- To-Mera – Delusions (Candlelight, 2008)
- Testament – The Formation of Damnation (Nuclear Blast, 2008)
- Mandala – I (independent release, 2009)
- Immortal Dominion – Primortal (427 Records, 2009)
- Gwar – Lust in Space (inside sleeve artwork only) (Metal Blade, 2009)
- The Alien Blakk – Modes of Alienation (Reissue) (independent release, 2009)
- Masachist – Death March Fury (Witching Hour Productions, 2009)
- Hyperion – Orchestrating the Myth (independent release, 2010)
- The Crinn – Dreaming Saturn (Nuclear Blast, 2010)
- Enders Game – What We've Lost (independent release, 2010)
- Master – The Human Machine (Pulverized, 2010)
- Anacrusis – Hindsight: Suffering Hour & Reason Revisited (Anacrusis, 2010)
- Virus – The Agent That Shapes the Desert (Duplicate, 2010)
- Mekong Delta – Wanderer on the Edge of Time (AAARRG, 2010)
- Sigh – Scenes from Hell (The End, 2010)
- Acrania – Unbreakable Fury (independent release, 2010)
- Atheist – Jupiter (Season of Mist, 2010)
- Sodom – In War and Pieces (SPV, 2010)
- Advent of Bedlam – Flesh Over God (independent release, 2012)
- Sigh – In Somniphobia (Candlelight, 2012)
- Hammercult – Anthems of the Damned (Sonic Attack/SPV, 2012)
- Testament – Dark Roots of Earth (Nuclear Blast, 2012)
- Acrania – An Uncertain Collision (independent release, 2012)
- Hatebreed – The Divinity of Purpose (USA – Razor & Tie, Europe – Nuclear Blast, 2013)
- Evile – Skull (Earache, 2013)
- Spheron – Ecstasy of God (Apostasy Records, 2013)
- Dark Sermon – In Tongues (eOne, 2013)
- Satan – Life Sentence (Listenable, 2013)
- Artizan – Ancestral Energy (Pure Steel, 2013)
- Ferium – Reflections (independent release, 2014)
- Iced Earth – Plagues of Babylon (Century Media, 2014)
- Orpheus Blade – Wolf's Cry (Pitch Black, 2015)
- Artizan – The Furthest Reaches – Limited Edition Version (Pure Steel, 2015)
- Acrania – Fearless (independent release, 2015)
- Soulfly - Archangel (Nuclear Blast, 2015)
- Testament – Brotherhood of the Snake (Nuclear Blast, 2016)
- Winterhorde – Maestro (ViciSolum, 2016)
- Venom Prison – Animus (2016)
- Thy Art Is Murder – Dear Desolation (Nuclear Blast, 2017)
- Archspire – Relentless Mutation (Seasons of Mist, 2017)
- Black Wizard – Livin' Oblivion (Listenable, 2018)
- Bloodbath – The Arrow of Satan is Drawn (2018)
- Hate Eternal – Upon Desolate Sands (Season of Mist, 2018)
- Venom Prison – Samsara (Prosthetic, 2019)
- Despised Icon – Purgatory (Nuclear Blast, 2019)
- Andy Black – The Ghost of Ohio (Lava/Republic, 2019)
- The Wildhearts – Renaissance Men (Graphite, 2019)
- Thy Art Is Murder – Human Target (Nuclear Blast, 2019)
- Aversions Crown – Hell Will Come for Us All (Nuclear Blast, 2020)
- Venom Prison – Primeval (Prosthetic, 2020)
- Loudblast – Manifesto (Listenable, 2020)
- Gaerea – Limbo (Season of Mist, 2020)
- Incantation – Sect of Vile Divinities (Relapse, 2020)
- Havok – V (Century Media, 2020)
- Hatebreed – Weight of the False Self (Nuclear Blast, 2020)
- Heaven Shall Burn – Of Truth & Sacrifice (Nuclear Blast, 2020)
- My Dying Bride – The Ghost of Orion (Nuclear Blast, 2020)
- Testament – Titans of Creation (Nuclear Blast, 2020)
- Helloween – Helloween (Nuclear Blast, 2021)
- Archspire – Bleed the Future (Season of Mist, 2021)
- Kreator – Hate Über Alles (Nuclear Blast, 2022)
- Malevolence – Malicious Intent (MLVLTD, 2022)
- Entheos – Time Will Take Us All (Metal Blade, 2023)
- The Fall of Creation – Enlightenment (independent release, 2024)
- Helloween – Giants & Monsters (Reigning Phoenix, 2025)
- Heaven Shall Burn - Heimat (Century Media, 2025)
- Testament – Para Bellum (Nuclear Blast, 2025)
- Despised Icon – Shadow Work (Nuclear Blast, 2025)
- Immolation – Descent (Nuclear Blast, 2026)

== Book cover illustration credits ==
- Moshe Peled – Back to the Circuit (Kavim Publishing Inc., 2007)
