= Intersections (Mekong Delta album) =

Studio album by Mekong Delta
- Released: 23 April 2012
- Recorded: 2011–2012
- Genres: Neo-classical metal Progressive metal Thrash metal
- Length: 53:26
- Label: Steamhammer / SPV
- Producer: Ralph Hubert

Mekong Delta chronology
Wanderer on the Edge of Time (2010)	Intersections (2012)	In a Mirror Darkly (2014)

Intersections is the tenth album from progressive/thrash metal band Mekong Delta, released in April 2012. It is a compilation of songs from previous albums that were re-recorded with the current line-up.

== Track listing ==
1. "The Cure" – 04:15
2. "Shades of Doom" – 04:20
3. "Sphere Eclipse" – 06:18
4. "The Healer" – 07:38
5. "Innocent" – 05:20
6. "Memories of Tomorrow" – 04:44
7. "Heroes Grief" – 05:44
8. "Heartbeat" – 07:04
9. "Transgressor" – 03:38
10. "Prophecy" – 04:25

=== Song origins ===
- Tracks 1 and 7 are from Mekong Delta (1987).
- Tracks 6 and 10 are from The Music of Erich Zann (1988).
- Track 2 is from The Principle of Doubt (1989).
- Track 9 is from Dances of Death (and Other Walking Shadows) (1990).
- Tracks 3, 5 and 8 are from Kaleidoscope (1992).
- Track 4 is from Visions Fugitives (1994).

== Band line-up ==
- Ralph Hubert – bass guitar
- Martin Lemar — vocals
- Alex Landenburg — drums
- Erik Adam H. Grösch — guitars
- Benedikt Zimniak — guitars
