= Acts of God (Immolation album) =

Studio album by Immolation
- Released: February 18, 2022
- Recorded: August 2021
- Studio: Millbrook Sound Studios, Sharon, Connecticut
- Genre: Death metal
- Length: 52:15
- Label: Nuclear Blast

Immolation chronology
Atonement (2017)	Acts of God (2022)	Descent (2026)

Singles from Acts of God
- 1. "Apostle" Released: December 10, 2021; 2. "The Age of No Light" Released: January 16, 2022; 3. "Blooded" Released: February 18, 2022

Acts of God is the eleventh studio album by American death metal band Immolation. It was released on February 18, 2022, through Nuclear Blast. Three singles were released, all with corresponding music videos. The reception for the album was overwhelmingly positive. Immolation supported the album with extensive touring.

Professional ratings
Review scores
Source	Rating
Angry Metal Guy	4/5 stars
BangerTV	4.5/5 stars
Blabbermouth	9.5/10
Distorted Sound	9/10
Ghost Cult	7/10
Kerrang!	4/5 stars
Metal Rules	3.5/5 stars
Metal Injection	8.5/10
The Razor's Edge	Favorable
Rock Hard	9/10

== Release ==
On August 1, 2021, Immolation shared photos and a message on their Instagram account, indicating that they had entered the studio. They followed up with the official announcement of the album in December 2021, accompanied by the release of the first single "Apostle". The single received a video, directed by guitarist Robert Vigna. The second single "The Age of No Light", also directed by Vigna, was released in January 2022. The band released the third single "Blooded", along with a video directed again by Vigna, on the day of the album release. The track "Let the Darkness In" features additional vocals by American extreme metal musician Dan Lilker.

== Touring ==
The release day of the album marked also the start of the "Acts of God North American Tour 2022", the band headlined in February and March 2022. In May 2022, Immolation joined the U.S. tour of British death metal band Carcass. In November and December 2022, the band supported American death metal band Cannibal Corpse on their North American tour. In April and May 2023, the band was part of the North American tour of American death metal band Obituary, finally supporting American grindcore band Cattle Decapitation on their North American tour dates in November and December 2023. Immolation headed for Europe in 2024, again joining Cannibal Corpse on their European tour in September and October.

== Critical reception ==
Acts of God garnered vastly positive reviews. Reviewers generally recognized the musical consistency of the band throughout their career, their signature sound and their influence on the death metal scene. Nick Ruskell of Kerrang! wrote that the band "continue to shine in both blunt reliability and heavy creativity" while knowing "exactly how and when to colour outside the lines.". Gavin Brown of Distorted Sound compared the album to its predecessor Atonement, commenting: "It sees the New York band building on what they achieved with Atonement but with even more vigour and a focused surge of venom on this huge sounding record." Brown concluded that listeners "will marvel at the full dizzying effect" of the album. Blabbermouth's Jay H. Gorania considered "Acts of God" Immolation's best album since the release of "Unholy Cult" in 2002. With guitarist Alex Bouks's close ties to the band even before taking on the position on guitar, Goriana pointed out the enduring chemistry in the band, saying, "the seasoned marriage of personalities and musicians lends itself to a chemistry and musical interplay that's incredibly cohesive and natural. The veterans' technical know-how and intricate compositions are paradoxically channeled into the straightforward, digestible song flow here." Jeff Podoshen in his review for Metal Injection praised the production work of the album: "This is one of the band's best sounding records in the digital age."

== Track listing ==
No.	Title	Length
1.	"Abandoned"	1:08
2.	"An Act of God"	4:04
3.	"The Age of No Light"	3:39
4.	"Noose of Thorns"	5:12
5.	"Shed the Light"	3:37
6.	"Blooded"	3:15
7.	"Overtures of the Wicked"	3:44
8.	"Immoral Stain"	4:03
9.	"Incineration Procession"	3:47
10.	"Broken Prey"	3:03
11.	"Derelict of Spirit"	4:12
12.	"When Halos Burn"	3:08
13.	"Let the Darkness In"	3:28
14.	"And the Flames Wept"	1:38
15.	"Apostle"	4:17

== Personnel ==
=== Immolation ===
- Ross Dolan – bass, vocals
- Robert Vigna – lead guitar
- Alex Bouks – rhythm guitar
- Steve Shalaty – drums

=== Additional musicians ===
- Dan Lilker – additional vocals (13)

=== Technical personnel ===
- Eliran Kantor – artwork
- Santiago Jaramillo – inside artwork
- Paul Orofino – engineering, tracking
- Rob Kimura – layout
- Zack Ohren – mixing, mastering
- Dennis Coleman – photography
