= Kingdom of Conspiracy =

Studio album by Immolation
- Released: May 10, 2013
- Recorded: Millbrook Sound Studios in New York
- Genre: Death metal
- Length: 40:48
- Label: Nuclear Blast
- Producer: Paul Orofino

Immolation chronology
Majesty and Decay (2010)	Kingdom of Conspiracy (2013)	Atonement (2017)

Kingdom of Conspiracy is the ninth studio album by American death metal band Immolation. It was released on May 10, 2013 through Nuclear Blast Records. The album is Immolation's first concept album and was produced by Paul Orofino, who has produced every Immolation album since 1999's Failures for Gods.

== Concept ==
Kingdom of Conspiracy continues to explore political subject matter rather than the anti-religion topics that dominated the band's earlier releases. Ross Dolan said this is the band's first concept album and that it was influenced by George Orwell's Nineteen Eighty-Four. He described the theme in an interview with Metal Blast:

It's about real conspiracies, it's about people conspiring every day to do very bad things, evil things in the name of greed and self-preservation and power. […] It's easier to look the other way and not have to confront these things head-on. I think that's what makes it a very dark album. […] If you follow the way things happened in Germany in the ’30s, people were groomed very slowly back then. And when the chains were finally wrapped around the country, it was too late for a lot of those people to do anything.

The album artwork, by Pär Olofsson, also elaborated upon the concept. As guitarist Robert Vigna explained, the figures are shackles with their eyes and mouths sewn shut to represent "the chilling of speech and the intentional blinding of the masses." Furthermore, the large structure in the background, which Vigna described as "ominous", symbolized the growth of the security state and the consequent failing of existing social structures.

== Reception ==
Professional ratings
Review scores
Source	Rating
About.com	4.5/5 stars
Brave Words & Bloody Knuckles	9/10
Decibel Magazine	8/10
Exclaim!	9/10
Metalsucks	4/5 stars
Pitchfork	8/10
Planet Mosh	9/10

Kingdom of Conspiracy received positive reviews from music critics. Writing for About.com, Dave Schalek called the album "essential," praising its "big, baroque songs with atypical, swirling riffs." Denise Falzon of Exclaim wrote that the band "push[es] their boundaries with fresh, innovative twists, in order to create albums that build upon their style while remaining distinctly Immolation." At Pitchfork, Hank Shteamer called the band "one of the most rewarding veteran acts in the genre" and said that "like their contemporaries Suffocation and Incantation, Immolation are currently producing some of the strongest material of their career, an expertly calibrated blend of the byzantine and the straightforwardly brutal, simply by following their own muse."

The album debuted at number 13 on Billboard's Heatseekers Albums chart. Immolation's previous album, Majesty and Decay, had debuted at number 29 on the same chart.

== Track listing ==
No.	Title	Length
1.	"Kingdom of Conspiracy"	3:48
2.	"Bound to Order"	3:49
3.	"Keep the Silence"	4:06
4.	"God Complex"	3:35
5.	"Echoes of Despair"	3:45
6.	"Indoctrinate"	4:48
7.	"The Great Sleep"	5:22
8.	"A Spectacle of Lies"	3:14
9.	"Serving Divinity"	3:36
10.	"All That Awaits Us"	4:50
Total length:		40:53

== Personnel ==
Immolation

- Ross Dolan – bass, vocals
- Robert Vigna – lead guitar
- Bill Taylor – rhythm guitar
- Steve Shalaty – drums

Production

- Zack Ohren – mixing, mastering
- Pär Olofsson – cover art
- Paul Orofino – production
