= Atonement (Immolation album) =

Studio album by Immolation
- Released: February 24, 2017
- Recorded: Millbrook Sound Studios, Millbrook, New York
- Genre: Death metal
- Length: 48:48
- Label: Nuclear Blast

Immolation chronology
Kingdom of Conspiracy (2013)	Atonement (2017)	Acts of God (2022)

Atonement is the tenth studio album by American death metal band Immolation. It was released on February 24, 2017, through Nuclear Blast Records.

== Reception ==
Professional ratings
Aggregate scores
Source	Rating
Metacritic	82/100
Review scores
Source	Rating
Angry Metal Guy	4.5/5 stars
Brave Words & Bloody Knuckles	9.5/10
Consequence of Sound	B
Exclaim!	9/10
Metal Forces	9/10
MetalSucks	3.5/5 stars
Pitchfork	7.7/10
Sputnikmusic	3.7/5
Terrorizer	9/10

Atonement received universal acclaim from critics. At Metacritic (a review aggregator site which assigns a normalized rating out of 100 from music critics), based on 5 critics, the album has received a score of 82/100, which indicates "Universal acclaim". Serena Cherry of Terrorizer called Atonement "one of the greatest albums of their career", being "packed with exactly the kind of mind-bogglingly intricate guitar work, meticulous song writing and guttural satanic growls that we have come to expect." Exclaim! ranked the album at number 8 on their list of Top 10 Metal and Hardcore Albums of 2017.

== Track listing ==
No.	Title	Length
1.	"The Distorting Light"	3:14
2.	"When the Jackals Come"	3:54
3.	"Fostering the Divide"	3:27
4.	"Rise the Heretics"	3:41
5.	"Thrown to the Fire"	4:04
6.	"Destructive Currents"	4:26
7.	"Lower"	4:01
8.	"Atonement"	4:32
9.	"Above All"	4:55
10.	"The Power of Gods"	3:58
11.	"Epiphany"	4:22
12.	"Immolation" (Re-recorded from Dawn of Possession)	4:13

== Personnel ==
Immolation

- Ross Dolan – bass, vocals
- Robert Vigna – lead guitar
- Alex Bouks – rhythm guitar
- Steve Shalaty – drums

Technical

- Zack Ohren – mixing, mastering
- Pär Olofsson – cover art
- Paul Orofino – production
- Zbigniew Bielak – additional artwork
- Rob Kimura – layout
