= Baliset =

Baliset may refer to:

- Baliset (instrument), a fictional musical instrument in the Dune universe
- Baliset (band), an American band
