= Close to a World Below =

Studio album by Immolation
- Released: November 7, 2000
- Recorded: June 2000
- Studio: Millbrook Sound Studios, Millbrook, New York
- Genre: Death metal
- Length: 41:57
- Label: Metal Blade
- Producer: Paul Orofino, Immolation

Immolation chronology
| Failures for Gods (1999) | Close to a World Below (2000) | Unholy Cult (2002) |

Close to a World Below is the fourth album by Immolation. It was released via Metal Blade Records in 2000.

== Critical reception ==
Professional ratings
Review scores
| Source | Rating |
|---|---|
| AllMusic | 4.5/5 stars |
| Metal Storm | 9.7/10 |

Since its release, Close to a World Below has received universal acclaim. Todd Nief of AllMusic gave the Close to a World Below four and a half stars, calling the album a late-career classic. He stated that with Close to a World Below, Immolation released one of the most profound and creative death metal albums of the 2000s which gave a new voice to a genre deluged with cookie-cutter clones. Metal Storm gave Close to a World Below a near-perfect 9.7 out of 10 praising Ross Dolan's vocals along with the overall brutality of the album.

== Track listing ==
All lyrics are written by Ross Dolan; all music is composed by Robert Vigna.

| No. | Title | Length |
|---|---|---|
| 1. | "Higher Coward" | 5:00 |
| 2. | "Father, You're Not a Father" | 5:02 |
| 3. | "Furthest from the Truth" | 4:25 |
| 4. | "Fall from a High Place" | 4:37 |
| 5. | "Unpardonable Sin" | 4:33 |
| 6. | "Lost Passion" | 5:40 |
| 7. | "Put My Hand in the Fire" | 4:11 |
| 8. | "Close to a World Below" | 8:29 |
| Total length: | | 41:57 |

== Personnel ==
Immolation

- Ross Dolan – bass, vocals
- Robert Vigna – lead guitar
- Thomas Wilkinson – rhythm guitar
- Alex Hernandez – drums

Production

- Paul Orofino – production, engineering, mastering
- Immolation – production

Visual art

- Jeff Wolfe – photography
- Andreas & Alex Marschall – cover art
