= Too Fast to Die =

Studio album by Archspire
- Released: April 10, 2026
- Genre: Technical death metal
- Length: 39:20
- Producer: Dave Otero

Archspire chronology
Bleed the Future (2021)	Too Fast to Die (2026)

Singles from Too Fast to Die
- 1. "Carrion Ladder" Released: December 9, 2025; 2. "Limb of Leviticus" Released: January 13, 2026; 3. "Red Goliath" Released: March 6, 2026; 4. "The Vessel" Released: April 3, 2026

Too Fast to Die is the fifth studio album by the Canadian technical death metal band Archspire. It was self-released on April 10, 2026. This is the first album to feature Spencer Moore on drums.

== Background and singles ==
On September 23, 2024, it was announced that drummer Spencer Prewett had departed Archspire, and the band started an online audition contest, seeking a replacement. The search was finalized with the announcement that Spencer Moore was joining the band on May 27, 2025, while also teasing a new record set for release later that year.

On May 29, 2025, Archspire announced that they planned to release their next album independently, citing record labels typically getting 80-85% of royalties over bands. They launched a Kickstarter campaign seeking $125,000 to fund the record, breaking down the exact details of what they had already spent money on and what they planned to fund. On December 9, 2025, the band announced their fifth album, Too Fast to Die, set to be released on April 10, 2026. A music video from the album's lead single, "Carrion Ladder", was also released. On January 13, 2026, Archspire released the second single "Limb of Leviticus". On March 6, 2026, they released the third single "Red Goliath". On April 3, 2026, they released the fourth single "The Vessel".

== Track listing ==
All lyrics are written by Oliver Rae Aleron; all music is composed by Archspire.

Too Fast to Die track listing
No.	Title	Length
1.	"Liminal Cypher"	5:16
2.	"Red Goliath"	5:01
3.	"Carrion Ladder"	4:23
4.	"Anomalous Descent"	4:13
5.	"The Vessel"	4:41
6.	"Limb of Leviticus"	5:42
7.	"Deadbolt the Backward"	4:32
8.	"Too Fast to Die"	5:32
Total length:		39:20

== Personnel ==
Credits are adapted from Tidal and Bandcamp.

=== Archspire ===
- Oliver Rae Aleron – vocals
- Dean Lamb – guitars
- Spencer Moore – drums
- Tobi Morelli – guitars
- Jared Smith – bass guitar

=== Technical ===
- Dave Otero – production, recording
- Mike Low – engineering assistance

== Charts ==
Chart performance for Too Fast to Die
Chart (2026)	Peak position
UK Album Downloads (OCC)	21
