= Fearless (Acrania album) =

Studio album by Acrania
- Released: 25 April 2015
- Recorded: September – November 2014
- Studio: Various: Archway Studios (Mexico City, Mexico); Tower Studio (Montpellier, France)
- Genre: Progressive metal; Latin metal; technical death metal; avant-garde metal
- Length: 38:51
- Label: Acrania
- Producer: Johnny Chavez

Acrania chronology
| An Uncertain Collision (2012) | Fearless (2015) |

Singles from Fearless
- 1. "People of the Blaze" Released: 21 March 2015; 2. "I Was Never Dead" Released: 28 August 2017

Fearless is the third studio album by Mexican progressive metal and Latin metal band Acrania, released on April 25, 2015 with the support of Mexico's Council for Culture and Arts. The album is the first to feature guitarist César Cortés, who replaced Félix Carreón in 2013. A music playthrough video was released for the album's first single "People of the Blaze" on April 22, 2015. A second music video for the song "I Was Never Dead" was released on August 21, 2017.

== Track listing ==
All tracks are written by Luis Oropeza except Point Of Collision and Blinded by Power by César Cortés

| No. | Title | Length |
|---|---|---|
| 1. | "People of the Blaze" | 3:59 |
| 2. | "Poverty is in the Soul" | 6:25 |
| 3. | "I Was Never Dead" | 3:58 |
| 4. | "Blinded By Power" | 4:41 |
| 5. | "Overflow" | 1:52 |
| 6. | "En el Puerto" | 1:11 |
| 7. | "Hypocritical Conflict" | 3:35 |
| 8. | "Man's Search for Meaning" | 8:26 |
| 9. | "Point of Collision" | 4:36 |
| Total length: | | 38:51 |

== Personnel ==
Acrania

- Luis Oropeza – Vocals, Guitars
- Johnny Chavez – Drums
- César Cortés – Guitars
- Alberto Morales – Bass

Additional musicians

- Ignacio Gómez – Percussion
- Daniel Pérez – Sax
- Said Cuevas – Trumpet
  Professional ratings
  Review scores
  | Source | Rating |
  |---|---|
  | Pure Grain Audio | 7.9/10 |
  | Worship Metal | 9/10 |
- Adriana Cao – Arpa jarocha

Production and design

- Johnny Chavez – production, engineering, mixing
- Acrania – production, music arrangement
- Brett Caldas-Lima – Mastering
- Eliran Kantor – artwork
- Germán García – photography
