= Descent (Immolation album) =

Studio album by Immolation
- Released: April 10, 2026
- Recorded: October 2025
- Studio: Mercinary, Cleveland; Rochester, New York
- Genre: Death metal
- Length: 41:35
- Label: Nuclear Blast
- Producer: Zack Ohren

Immolation chronology
| Acts of God (2022) | Descent (2026) |

Singles from Descent
- 1. "Adversary" Released: January 16, 2026; 2. "Attrition" Released: March 10, 2026; 3. "Bend Towards the Dark" Released: April 10, 2026

Descent is the twelfth studio album by the American death metal band Immolation, released on April 10, 2026, through Nuclear Blast Records.

== Release and promotion ==
On January 16, 2026, Nuclear Blast released the single Adversary from the album, which was accompanied by a video directed by guitarist Robert Vigna. In support of the album, the band announced live activities throughout the year 2026. In February, Immolation embarked on the Death Over Europe Tour with black metal bands Mayhem and Marduk. The band released the second single off the album, Attrition, on March 10, 2026. The video for the single was also directed by Vigna. On the day of the album release, the band issued the third single Bend Towards the Dark and an accompanying video, directed by Vigna. In April and May, Immolation joined Behemoth, Deicide and Rotting Christ in the United States on The Godless IV tour, following up with festival dates during the summer.

Professional ratings
Review scores
| Source | Rating |
|---|---|
| Angry Metal Guy | 3.5/5 stars |
| BangerTV | 4.2/5 stars |
| Blabbermouth | 9/10 |
| Chaos | 4.5/5 stars |
| Distorted Sound | 9/10 |
| KNAC | 4.5/5 stars |
| Metal Forces | 8/10 |
| Rock Hard | 8/10 |

== Track listing ==
All tracks are written by Immolation.

| No. | Title | Length |
|---|---|---|
| 1. | "These Vengeful Winds" | 4:04 |
| 2. | "The Ephemeral Curse" | 3:57 |
| 3. | "God’s Last Breath" | 4:22 |
| 4. | "Adversary" | 3:17 |
| 5. | "Attrition" | 4:44 |
| 6. | "Bend Towards the Dark" | 3:56 |
| 7. | "Host" | 4:12 |
| 8. | "False Ascent" | 3:49 |
| 9. | "Banished" | 3:17 |
| 10. | "Descent" | 5:57 |
| Total length: | | 41:35 |

== Personnel ==
=== Immolation ===
- Ross Dolan – bass, vocals
- Robert Vigna – lead guitar
- Alex Bouks – rhythm guitar
- Steve Shalaty – drums

=== Additional musicians ===
- Dan Lilker – guest vocals (7, 10)

=== Technical personnel ===
- Zack Ohren – production, mixing, mastering
- Noah C. Buchanan – engineering (drums)
- Justin Passamonte – engineering (guitars, bass, vocals)
- Eliran Kantor – cover art
- Santiago Francisco Jaramillo – interior artwork
- Rob Kimura – layout

== Charts ==
Chart performance for Descent
| Chart (2026) | Peak position |
|---|---|
| Austrian Albums (Ö3 Austria) | 44 |
| Belgian Albums (Ultratop Flanders) | 44 |
| Belgian Albums (Ultratop Wallonia) | 64 |
| French Albums (SNEP) | 184 |
| French Rock & Metal Albums (SNEP) | 6 |
| German Albums (Offizielle Top 100) | 55 |
| German Rock & Metal Albums (Offizielle Top 100) | 15 |
| Polish Albums (ZPAV) | 7 |
| Scottish Albums (OCC) | 70 |
| Swiss Albums (Schweizer Hitparade) | 38 |
| UK Albums Sales (OCC) | 49 |
| UK Independent Albums (OCC) | 25 |
| UK Rock & Metal Albums (OCC) | 9 |
