= Wanderer on the Edge of Time =

Studio album by Mekong Delta
- Released: 22 June 2010
- Recorded: 2010
- Genre: Neo-classical metal, progressive metal, thrash metal
- Length: 49:34
- Label: AAARRG Music
- Producer: Ralph Hubert

Mekong Delta chronology
Lurking Fear (2007)	Wanderer on the Edge of Time (2010)	Intersections (2012)

Professional ratings
Review scores
Source	Rating
Chronicles of Chaos	6.5/10 stars

Wanderer on the Edge of Time is the ninth album from progressive/thrash metal band Mekong Delta, released in June 2010. Chronicles of Chaos noted a firm combination of classical and acoustic music combined with the primary thrash metal genre, however it was felt that too many of the songs were repetitive - both of this album and of its predecessors.

== Track listing ==
1. Intro - Concert Guitar - 02:18
2. Ouverture - 02:50
3. "A certain fool" (Le fou) // Movement 1 - 03:37
4. Interlude 1 - Group - 00:52
5. "The 5th element" (Le Bateleur) // Movement 2 - 06:32
6. Interlude 2 - Group - 00:34
7. "The Apocalypt - World in shards" (La Maison Dieu) // Movement 3 - 05:43
8. Interlude 3 - Concert Guitar - 02:03
9. "King with broken crown" (Le Diable) // Movement 4 - 05:41
10. Intermezzo (instrumental) // Movement 5 - 05:23
11. Interlude 4 - Group - 02:11
12. "Affection" (L'Amoureux) // Movement 6 - 02:53
13. Interlude 5 - Group - 00:51
14. "Mistaken truth" (Le Hérétique) // Movement 7 - 05:10
15. Finale - 02:56

== Band line-up ==
- Ralph Hubert — bass guitar
- Martin Lemar — vocals
- Alex Landenburg — drums
- Erik Adam H. Grösch — guitars
- Benedikt Zimniak — guitars

== Additional credits ==
- Ralph Hubert — Producer, mixer
- Erik Grösch — Co-producer, mixer
- Eliran Kantor — Artwork and design
