= Acrania (band) =

Mexican metal band

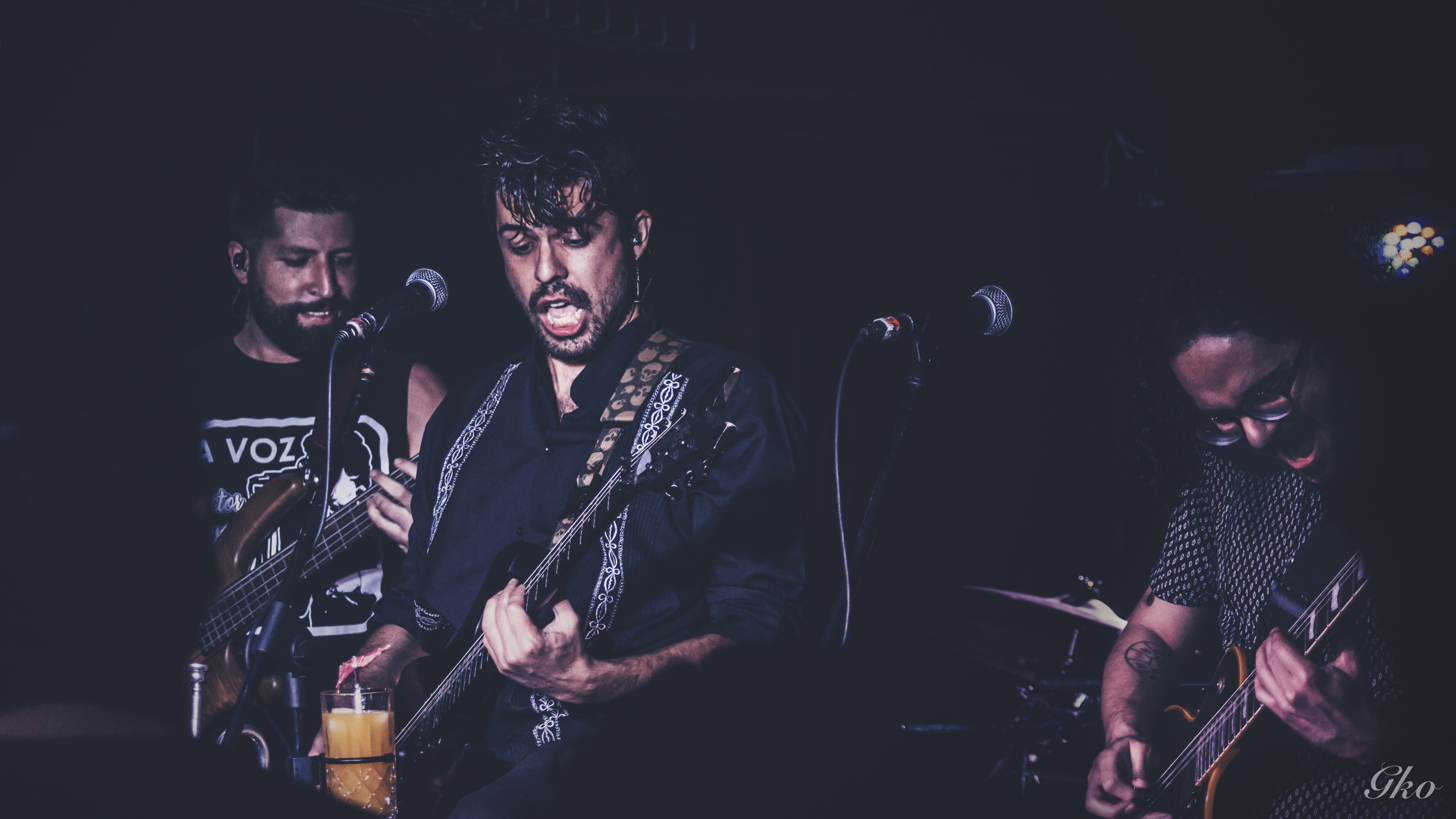
- Performing in 2019

Background information
- Origin: Mexico City, Mexico
- Genres: Progressive metal; Latin metal; technical death metal; avant-garde metal
- Years active: 2005–present
- Members: Luis Oropeza; Johnny Chavez; Alberto Morales; César Cortés; Dani Monti
- Past members: Félix Carreón; David Mejía; Jimena Contreras; Ignacio Gómez Ceja; Iván Morales
- Website: acrania.net

Acrania is a Mexican progressive/Latin metal band from Mexico City, founded in 2001 by guitarist and vocalist Luis Oropeza, drummer Johnny Chavez and guitarist Félix Carreón as Necrofilia. The band is known for their unique combination of death/thrash metal with Latin jazz and Afro-Caribbean music as well as use of brass instrumentation and Latin percussion.

The current line-up includes Oropeza, drummer Johnny Chavez, guitarist César Cortés, bassist Alberto Morales and percussionist Dani Monti. The band has released three studio albums, one EP and two music videos since its formation.

Their latest album Fearless was released on April 25, 2015 with the support of Mexico's Council for Culture and Arts, and has been listed among 2015 best albums from sites like Angry Metal Guy, Pure Grain Audio and No Clean Singing. The band has released all their albums with artwork by Israeli artist Eliran Kantor.

== History ==
=== Formation and the Necrofilia years (2001–2005) ===
Acrania was formed in 2001 in Mexico City by guitarist Luis Oropeza, guitarist Félix Carreón, and drummer Johnny Chavez under the name Necrofilia. This first formation of the band recorded a self-titled demo in 2004, together with singer Diego Merino, bassist David Mejía, and keyboardist Jimena Contreras. Merino left the band in late 2004, with Oropeza stepping up as vocalist. In 2005, Mejía and Contreras would also leave the band, with Alberto Morales taking over as bassist. After this lineup change, the band decided that their refreshed musical style required a new name, so it became Acrania.

=== Unbreakable Fury and European debut (2006–2011) ===
In 2007, after a year of writing songs and getting rid of the Necrofilia music, the band entered the studio for the recording of their first EP, In Peaceful Chaos. The self-produced EP, which consisted on four tracks, was recorded from April to June at Mexico City, and released on September.

The band continued working on new material, which led to the recording of their first album, Unbreakable Fury, in 2009. The album contained all tracks from their previous EP, except "Emotionally Unstabilized", with five new tracks. Recorded at the same studio as In Peaceful Chaos, the album was mastered in 2010 by Jesús Bravo at Irapuato, and released on November. Due to Chavez moving to Switzerland for a year, Elli Noise's drummer Iván Morales filled in as drummer. Before the release of the album, the band had already built a local reputation that lead to sharing stage with Diablo Swing Orchestra on July 17, 2010.

During December, with Chavez back at drums, Acrania made their European debut with a five date tour with the help of the Wacken Foundation. The band played at Berlin, Soest, Dresden, Helsinki, and Zürich.

During 2011, the album began to get recognition among media and fans. On March, Unbreakable Fury was nominated for the Best Metal Album at the Fourth Indie-O Music Awards (IMAS). The band toured Mexico during fall, with new member Ignacio Gómez on percussions, and fell short during the Wacken Metal Battle Mexico final.

=== An Uncertain Collision (2012–2013) ===
Acrania's second album, An Uncertain Collision, was recorded during June and July, 2012 at the recording studio at Circo Volador, one of the most iconic venues for heavy metal in Mexico. For this album, the band received support from the National Council for Arts and Culture (CONACULTA), and all production, tracking and mixing was made by Oropeza and Chavez. Mastered again by Bravo, the album was released on October 20, and delivered the first band's single, "Treason, Politics & Death", which was released with a music video on January 8, 2013. This second album led Acrania to perform as opening act for Death's "Death to All" tour in Mexico. On July, An Uncertain Collision was recognized as Best Progressive Metal Album at Kalani Metal Awards. Later that year, Carreón and Gómez left the band.

=== Fearless (2014–present) ===
With new guitarist Caesar Augustus on board, Acrania went back into the studio for the recording of their third album, Fearless, this time with the support of the National Fund for Culture and Arts (FONCA). The album was again produced and mixed by Chavez and Oropeza, with French engineer Brett Caldas-Lima, who has worked with bands such as Megadeth, Ayreon and several Mexican bands, in charge of mastering. On October 18, the band was part of the Eyescream Metal Fest at Mexico City, alongside bands such as Exodus, The Agonist, Cattle Decapitation, and Havok.

Fearless was released on April 25, 2015, with "People of the Blaze" as the main single. The album got better reviews than their predecessors, including being ranked No. 20 in the 2015's 250 Best Latin Metal Albums by Headbangers Latinoamérica. The album got the band their second Kalani Award, this time in the category for Best Death Metal Album.

During August, 2016, Acrania toured Mexico alongside Drakonia for their Fearless Tour.

After a period of stagnation during 2017, Acrania played a series of shows in Mexico during late 2017 with percussionist Dani Montes, who was announced as official member on November 16.

On February 24, 2018, Acrania will be headlining their own festival, Puro Pinche Sabor United, at Circo Volador. The lineup will include Nuclear Chaos, Anima Tempo and Glass Mind.

== Musical style ==
Acrania is a death metal and thrash metal band, whose music has also been described as "a true Prog/Extreme Metal beast." Acrania mixes their death metal music with "Afro Cuban sounds, Jazz-like ambiances, and an unparalleled use of brass instrumentation."

Acrania's sound has been compared with that of American technical death metal band Atheist, in particular with their 1993 album Elements.

== Members ==
=== Current members ===
- Luis Oropeza – guitars, vocals (2001–present), trumpet (2008–present)
- Alberto Morales – bass (2005–present)
- Johnny Chavez – drums (2001–2009, 2010–present)
- César Cortés – guitars (2013–present), saxophone (2013–2016)
- Dani Monti – percussion (2017–present)

=== Former members ===
- Diego Merino – vocals (2001–2004)
- Félix Carreón – guitars (2001–2013)
- David Mejía – bass (2001–2005)
- Jimena Contreras – keyboards (2004–2005)
- Ignacio Gómez – percussion (2011–2013)
- Iván Morales – drums (2009–2010)

=== Live musicians ===
- Emmanuel Ferrón – percussion (2016–2017)

== Discography ==
- Unbreakable Fury (2010)
- An Uncertain Collision (2012)
- Fearless (2015)
