= Bleed the Future =

Studio album by Archspire
- Released: October 29, 2021
- Recorded: October–December 2020
- Studio: Flatline Studios (Denver, Colorado, United States)
- Genre: Technical death metal
- Length: 31:33
- Label: Season of Mist
- Producer: Dave Otero

Archspire chronology
Relentless Mutation (2017)	Bleed the Future (2021)	Too Fast to Die (2026)

Singles from Bleed the Future
- 1. "Golden Mouth of Ruin" Released: August 4, 2021; 2. "Bleed the Future" Released: September 3, 2021; 3. "Drone Corpse Aviator" Released: September 30, 2021

Bleed the Future is the fourth studio album by the Canadian technical death metal band Archspire, released on October 29, 2021, through Season of Mist. The album won the 2022 Juno Award for Metal/Hard Music Album of the Year. The album sold 3,700 units in its first week and debuted at No. 29 on the Top Album Sales charts. This was the final album to feature Spencer Prewett before his departure in September 2024.

== Promotion and release ==
In March 2020, Archspire announced they were rescheduling the "Tech Trek Canada" tour which they were set to headline with support from Soreption, Entheos, and Wormhole. The band announced that while self-isolating as per CDC guidelines, they would be using their time to continue to write the follow-up to 2017's Relentless Mutation. The band announced they were entering the studio in October 2020 to finish the album. They would once again be working with Dave Otero at Flatline studios in Denver. They would announce that they'd finished recording in December 2020, and noted that the album was a product of roughly two and a half years of writing adding that the "album is very fast, so please enjoy responsibly."

On August 4, 2021, the band released the first single for the album, "Golden Mouth of Ruin", alongside an accompanying music video. The band also announced the release date and provided the track listing for the album. The band would release a lyric video to accompany the title track on September 3, and a music video directed by Rob Zawistowski and Mitch Ray for "Drone Corpse Aviator" on September 30.

In December, the band released a documentary "Bring back the Danger" cataloguing the making of the album.

== Composition ==
The seventh song of the album, "Reverie on the Onyx", quotes the opening of the Lacrymosa from Mozart's Requiem, most notably in the first measures and again between 2:03 and 2:42.

== Reception ==
Professional ratings
Review scores
Source	Rating
Metal Injection	8/10
Angry Metal Guy	4.5/5.0
DistortedSoundMag	8/10

The album finished at No. 16 on Loudwire's Best Rock and Metal Albums of 2021 list. It was also named by MetalInjection as one of the best Technical Death Metal albums of 2021, with vocalist Oli Peters winning vocalist of the year and the album finishing 4th in fan polling.

== Chart performance ==
The album debuted at number No. 7 on the Billboard Heatseekers chart, No. 25 on the Hard Rock Album chart, and No. 8 on the Independent Albums chart.

== Track listing ==
No.	Title	Length
1.	"Drone Corpse Aviator"	3:46
2.	"Golden Mouth of Ruin"	4:04
3.	"Abandon the Linear"	4:35
4.	"Bleed the Future"	3:47
5.	"Drain of Incarnation"	4:18
6.	"Acrid Canon"	4:07
7.	"Reverie on the Onyx"	3:46
8.	"A.U.M."	3:03
Total length:		31:33

== Personnel ==
Archspire

- Oliver Rae Aleron – vocals
- Tobi Morelli – guitars
- Dean Lamb – guitars
- Jared Smith – bass
- Spencer Prewett – drums

Production

- Dave Otero – production, engineering, mixing, mastering
- Eliran Kantor – cover art

== Charts ==
Chart (2021)	Peak position
US Heatseekers Albums (Billboard)	7
US Independent Albums (Billboard)	8
US Top Album Sales (Billboard)	41
