= Relentless Mutation =

Studio album by Archspire
- Released: September 22, 2017
- Recorded: August – September 2016
- Studios: Flatline Studios (Denver, Colorado, United States)
- Genre: Technical death metal
- Length: 30:40
- Label: Season of Mist
- Producer: Dave Otero

Archspire chronology
The Lucid Collective (2014)	Relentless Mutation (2017)	Bleed the Future (2021)

Singles from Relentless Mutation
- 1. "Involuntary Doppelgänger" Released: July 5, 2017; 2. "Remote Tumour Seeker" Released: July 28, 2017; 3. "Human Murmuration" Released: August 22, 2017; 4. "Calamus Will Animate" Released: September 18, 2017

Relentless Mutation is the third studio album by the Canadian technical death metal band Archspire, released on September 22, 2017 through Season of Mist. It is the first album to feature bassist Jared Smith, who replaced bassist and vocalist Jaron Evil who departed in 2014.

In February 2018, Relentless Mutation was nominated for the 2018 Juno Awards Metal / Hard Music Album of the Year.

== Lyrics ==
The album is a concept album revolving around a telepathic cult called "A.U.M.", and their experiments on human biology. According to lyricist Aleron, the seven songs feature seven different people's stories, but are presented individually instead of a single linear narrative.

== Promotion and release ==
A lyric video for the album's premiere single, "Involuntary Doppelgänger", was released on July 5, 2017.

In addition to "Involuntary Doppelgänger", the band released three additional singles to promote the album: "Remote Tumour Seeker" on July 28, "Human Murmuration" on August 22, and "Calamus Will Animate" on September 18.

An instrumental lyric video was released via Season of Mist's YouTube channel to promote the fourth single "Calamus Will Animate".

The album was made available for streaming in its entirety via Season of Mist's YouTube channel on September 21, 2017.

== Reception ==
Professional ratings
Review scores
Source	Rating
Metal Injection	9/10
Angry Metal Guy	4.0/5.0
ItDjents	8/10
DistortedSoundMag	7/10

The album was praised by critics. Heavy metal review blog Angry Metal Guy named the album as their September album of the month, calling the album one that took Archspire's sound to the "next level", and praising it as "one of the most inspiring contributions to tech death that I’ve heard in a long time, hitting that perfect blend of intensity and technicality with the neo-classical flare of early Fleshgod Apocalypse.

In their 4.0 / 5.0 review of the album, the blog cited Archspire's Relentless Mutation as the album that would "make their legacy", and praised it as "innovative", stating that Archspire had now established themselves at the forefront of the tech death genre.

The blog would go on to rank the album at #7 in their best of 2017 list, with reviewer Kronos calling the album the best tech death record since Spawn of Possession's Incurso.

Heavy metal blog Heavy Blog is Heavy also praised the evolution of the band's sound, stating that it "shows a band with a perfect sound somehow evolving and becoming even more perfect. They would place the album at #5 on their 25 best albums of 2017 list.

Metal Injection ranked the album at 13 in their best albums of 2017, and called the album a "great step forward for death metal" while praising Oli Peters's vocal delivery.

== Chart performance ==
The album debuted at number No. 14 on the Billboard Heatseekers chart, No. 15 on the Hard Rock Album chart, No. 34 on the Independent Albums chart, and No. 46 on the Rock Albums chart.

== Track listing ==
No.	Title	Length
1.	"Involuntary Doppelgänger"	3:46
2.	"Human Murmuration"	4:13
3.	"Remote Tumour Seeker"	4:01
4.	"Relentless Mutation"	4:35
5.	"The Mimic Well"	4:05
6.	"Calamus Will Animate"	3:50
7.	"A Dark Horizontal"	6:10
Total length:		30:40

== Personnel ==
Archspire

- Oliver Rae Aleron – vocals
- Tobi Morelli – guitars
- Dean Lamb – guitars
- Jared Smith – bass
- Spencer Prewett – drums

Production

- Dave Otero – production, engineering, mixing, mastering
- Eliran Kantor – cover art
- Adrien Bousson – layout

== Charts ==
Chart (2017)	Peak position
US Heatseekers Albums (Billboard)	14
US Independent Albums (Billboard)	34
