= The Principle of Doubt =

- Cover art by Joachim Luetke

Studio album by Mekong Delta
- Released: 1989
- Genre: Progressive metal, thrash metal
- Length: 40:07
- Label: AAARRG Music
- Producer: Ralph Hubert

Mekong Delta chronology
The Music of Erich Zann (1988)	The Principle of Doubt (1989)	Dances of Death (and Other Walking Shadows) (1990)

Professional ratings
Review scores
Source	Rating
Prog Archives	5/5 stars
From the Dust Returned	(8.75/10)

The Principle of Doubt is the third album by the German progressive / thrash metal band Mekong Delta, released in 1989. The album is loosely based on Stephen R. Donaldson's dark fantasy trilogy, The Chronicles of Thomas Covenant, the Unbeliever.

== Track listing ==
All music composed by Ralph Hubert, except where indicated. Lyrics by Mekong Delta. Arrangements for group and orchestra of track 6 by Mekong Delta, arrangements for drum and bass of track 9 by Michael and Hubert.

1. "A Question of Trust (Cyberpunk 1)" - 3:27
2. "The Principle of Doubt (Chapter 3 Taken from the 'Chronicle of Doubt')" - 4:48
3. "Once I Believed (Chapter 1 Taken from the 'Chronicle of Doubt')" - 4:30
4. "Ever Since Time Began" - 4:25
5. "Curse of Reality (Chapter 14 Taken from the 'Chronicle of Doubt')" - 4:28
6. "Twilight Zone ('Lord Fouls Hort', Chapter 8 Taken from the 'Chronicle of Doubt')" (Marius Constant) - 3:29 (theme from The Twilight Zone)
7. "Shades of Doom (Cyberpunk 2)" - 4:05
8. "The Jester" - 5:52
9. "El Colibrí" (Julio Sagreras) - 1:16
10. "No Friend of Mine" - 3:47

== Personnel ==
=== Band members ===
- Wolfgang Borgmann (as "Keil") — vocals
- Uwe Baltrusch (as "Mark Kaye") — guitars, backing vocals
- Frank Fricke (as "Rolf Stein") — guitars
- Ralph Hubert (as "Björn Eklund") — bass guitar, acoustic guitar, producer
- Jörg Michael (as "Gordon 'The Machine' Perkins") — drums

=== Additional musicians ===
- Stu Phillips - orchestral variations composer

=== Production ===
- Jörg Stegert - engineer
- Joachim Luetke — cover art
