= Soul Demise =

German melodic death metal band

- Origin: Neumarkt, Bavaria, Germany
- Genre: Melodic death metal
- Years active: 1998–present
- Labels: Season of Mist, Remedy, Gutter
- Members: Roman Zimmerhackel (vocals); Andreas Schuhmeier (guitars); Alex Hagenauer (guitars); Michael Dauscher (bass guitar); Jan Sotiriu (drums)
- Past members: Markus Röger (guitar); Roland Jahoda (drums); Jürgen Aumann (vocals); Thomas Gschwendner (bass guitar); Oliver Maurer (drums)
- Website: souldemise.de

Soul Demise is a German melodic death metal band from Neumarkt, Bavaria, founded in 1993 as Inhuman. Their style is influenced by Swedish band At the Gates and their Gothenburg sound.

Guitarist Andreas Schuhmeier is the only founding member still with the band, which was renamed Soul Demise in 1998.

Soul Demise has toured with Vader (1997/98), Krisiun and Soilwork (1998), Immolation and Deströyer 666 (2001), Napalm Death (2002), Illdisposed (2002) and Dismember (2004), and have released multiple albums that were welcomed by specialist publications.

Their fourth album, Acts of Hate, was released on 17 April 2009.

== Discography ==
- Incantations (demo, 1994, as Inhuman)
- Inner Fears (self released, 1996, as Inhuman)
- Farewell to the Flesh (MCD, 1998)
- Beyond Human Perception (CD/LP, 2000) through Gutter Records
- In Vain (CD, 2002) through Season of Mist
- Blind (CD, 2005) through Remedy Records
- Acts of Hate (CD, 2009) through Remission/Soulfood
- Sindustry (CD, 2010) through Remission

== Sources ==
- Article at Whiskey-Soda.de
- Article and interview at Metal.de, 2005
