= Here in After =

Studio album by Immolation
- Released: February 13, 1996
- Recorded: July 1995
- Genre: Death metal
- Length: 37:22
- Label: Metal Blade

Immolation chronology
Stepping on Angels... Before Dawn (1995)	Here in After (1996)	Failures for Gods (1999)

Professional ratings
Review scores
Source	Rating
AllMusic	4/5 stars

Here in After is the second album by Immolation. It was released on February 13, 1996 through Metal Blade Records, after the band was dropped from Roadrunner Records. This is the last album to feature drummer Craig Smilowski. Alex Hernandez joined the band on their 1999 release Failures for Gods.

== Track listing ==
No.	Title	Length
1.	"Nailed to Gold"	3:54
2.	"Burn with Jesus"	4:01
3.	"Here in After"	4:54
4.	"I Feel Nothing"	4:41
5.	"Away from God"	4:45
6.	"Towards Earth"	4:47
7.	"Under the Supreme"	4:23
8.	"Christ's Cage"	5:51
Total length:		37:22

== Personnel ==
Immolation

- Ross Dolan – bass, vocals
- Robert Vigna – lead guitar
- Thomas Wilkinson – rhythm guitar
- Craig Smilowski – drums

Production

- Brian J Ames – design
- Wayne Dorell – engineering, mixing, producer
- Jim Forbes – assistant producer
- Brad Hyman – photography
- Andreas Marschall – cover art
- Eddy Schreyer – mastering
- Jeff Wolfe – live photography
