= Archspire =

Canadian technical death metal band

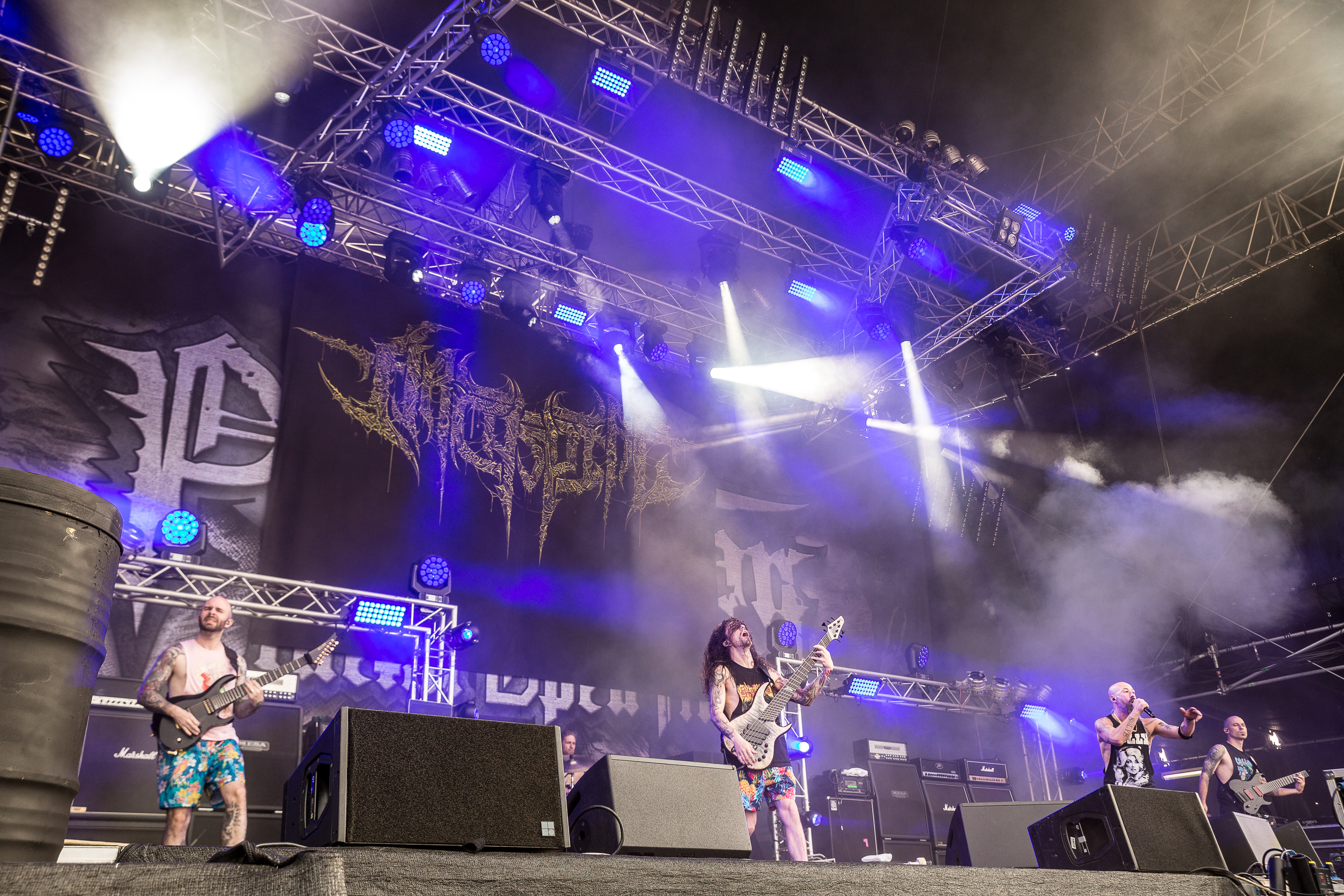
- Archspire live at Party.San Open Air 2023

Background information
- Also known as: Defenestrated (2007–2009)
- Origin: Vancouver, Canada
- Genre: Technical death metal
- Years active: 2007–present
- Labels: Season of Mist; Trendkill; Hadean
- Members: Tobi Morelli; Dean Lamb; Oli Peters; Jared Smith; Spencer Moore
- Past members: Shawn Haché; Jaron Good; Clayton Harder; Spencer Prewett
- Website: www.archspire.net

Archspire is a Canadian technical death metal band from Vancouver. They have released four studio albums through record label Season of Mist, and one released independently.

== History ==
=== Formation and All Shall Align (2007–2011) ===
The band was formed in 2007 as Defenestrated, but changed their name to Archspire in 2009. Members were guitarists Tobi Morelli and Dean Lamb, drummer Spencer Prewett, bassist Jaron "Evil" Good and vocalist Shawn Haché. Haché left to join Mitochondrion and was replaced with Oliver "Oli Peters" Aleron.

The band signed to Trendkill Recordings and, in April 2011, released their first album, All Shall Align. It was recorded between May and December 2010 with producer Stuart McKillop at The Hive Studio in Calgary.

=== The Lucid Collective (2012–2016) ===
In early 2013, Jaron Evil suffered a stroke at age 31. He recovered and briefly returned to the band, but left permanently in late 2013. Clayton Harder replaced him.

Also in 2013, Archspire signed with Season of Mist, and recorded a second album with Stuart McKillop, at Vancouver's Rain City Recorders. On February 2, 2014, the band released a single from their upcoming album, "Lucid Collective Somnambulation", and in April released The Lucid Collective.

In January 2015, the band announced they were seeking a permanent bass player as a replacement for Harder, who left to study jazz guitar at York University. They asked interested parties to record a video of themselves playing an Archspire song (they suggested "Deathless Ringing"). On January 12, 2016, the band announced that they had selected Jared Smith as their full-time bassist, and posted Smith's playthrough video of "Lucid Collective Somnambulation".

=== Relentless Mutation (2017–2020) ===
The band announced their third album, Relentless Mutation, and a single, "Involuntary Doppelgänger", on July 5, 2017. The album was released on September 22, 2017. At the Juno Awards of 2018, the album was nominated for Metal/Hard Music Album of the Year.

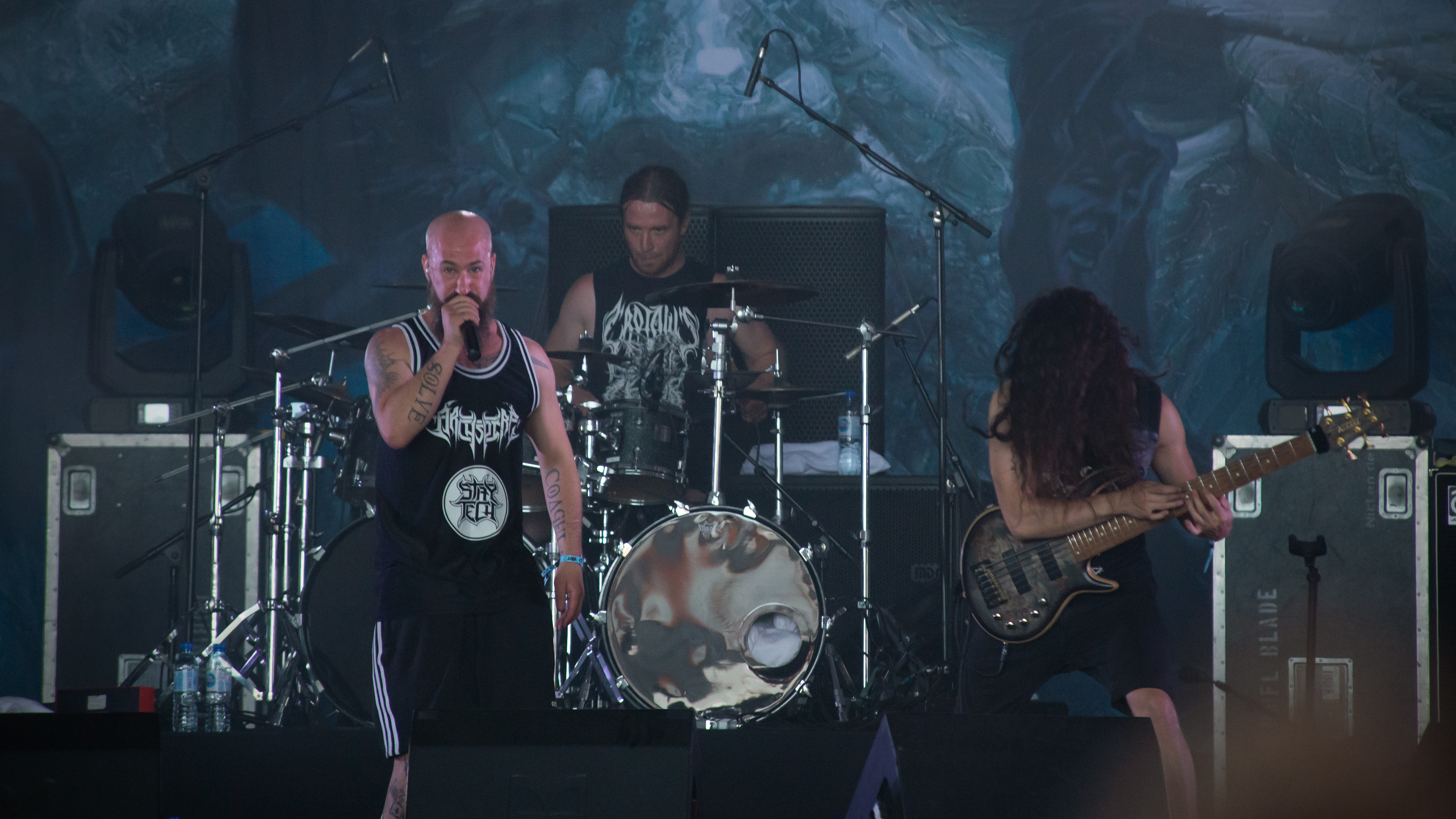
Archspire at Hellfest 2019

In 2019, the band made tech news headlines when a duo of programmers called Dadabots created a neural network trained on Archspire's music to produce a non-stop stream of technical death metal based on the band's music. Dadabots noted that Archspire's music produced the most consistent AI results, presumably because of the high tempo and technical machine-like nature of the songs. Archspire commented on the phenomenon, jokingly referring to themselves as robots.

Later that year, Peters and Prewett appeared in a cameo in the first episode of See. Actor Jason Momoa is a fan of the band and asked Peters to coach him for a warcry technique.

=== Bleed The Future (2021–2023) ===
On October 29, 2021, Archspire released their fourth studio album, Bleed the Future. Three singles were released: "Golden Mouth of Ruin", "Bleed the Future", and "Drone Corpse Aviator". "Golden Mouth of Ruin" and "Drone Corpse Aviator" were accompanied by videos, with the latter being the first fully-produced video the band had made. Loudwire elected the album as the 16th best rock/metal album of 2021. It won the Juno Awards of 2022.

=== Departure of Spencer Prewett and Too Fast to Die (2024–present) ===
On September 23, 2024, it was announced that drummer Spencer Prewett had departed the band. The band held open auditions through social media, and selected an unnamed drummer from Brazil. He was fired during the recording of the album when the band and producer Dave Otero agreed that the drummer was struggling to play the parts to the level they required. The band had to then pivot and demo the album out with programmed drums, and on Otero's suggestion, recruit ex-Inferi drummer Spencer Moore. Moore's joining was announced on May 27, 2025 while teasing the new record set for release later that year.

On May 29, 2025, the band announced that they planned to release their next album independently, citing record labels typically getting 80-85% of royalties over bands. They launched a Kickstarter campaign seeking $125,000 to fund the record, detailing what they had already spent money on and what they planned to fund. On December 9, 2025, the band announced their fifth album, Too Fast to Die, to be released on April 10, 2026. A music video from the album's lead single, "Carrion Ladder", was released. Following singles "Limb Of Leviticus", "Red Goliath" and "The Vessel" were released ahead of the April 10th album release date. A studio documentary of the album's making, including the story about the unnamed drummer was released on July 20.

== Musical style ==
=== Music ===
Archspire is an extreme high tempo variation of technical death metal. Guitarists Lamb and Morelli and bassist Smith use sweep picking, tapping and pinch harmonics, while drummer Prewett and successor Moore use blast beats, double stroke kicks and gravity blasts, as well as a technique called the "switch blast", where he would play a blast beat with one hand and hit cymbals with the other, and then, at the end of every bar, switch hands. Vocalist Aleron is inspired by chopper rappers such as Tech N9ne and Busta Rhymes.

=== Lyrics ===
Archspire's lyrics are fictional sci-fi and body horror stories. Common themes are forced evolution, transhumanism and cults. A recurring character in Peters's lyrics is the cult "A.U.M." which was inspired by Japanese cult Aum Shinrikyo. Their fictional matter, "The Drip", was inspired by the pitch drop experiment. Peters often challenges himself to work mundane subject matter into the lyrics. He described "Lucid Collective Somnambulation" as a "love song" about "two people sharing a dream", while "Calamus Will Animate" is about Lovecraftian horror in a pillow factory. While the songs feature narratives, the stories are linear.

== Band members ==
Archspire live at Party.San Metal Open Air 2023

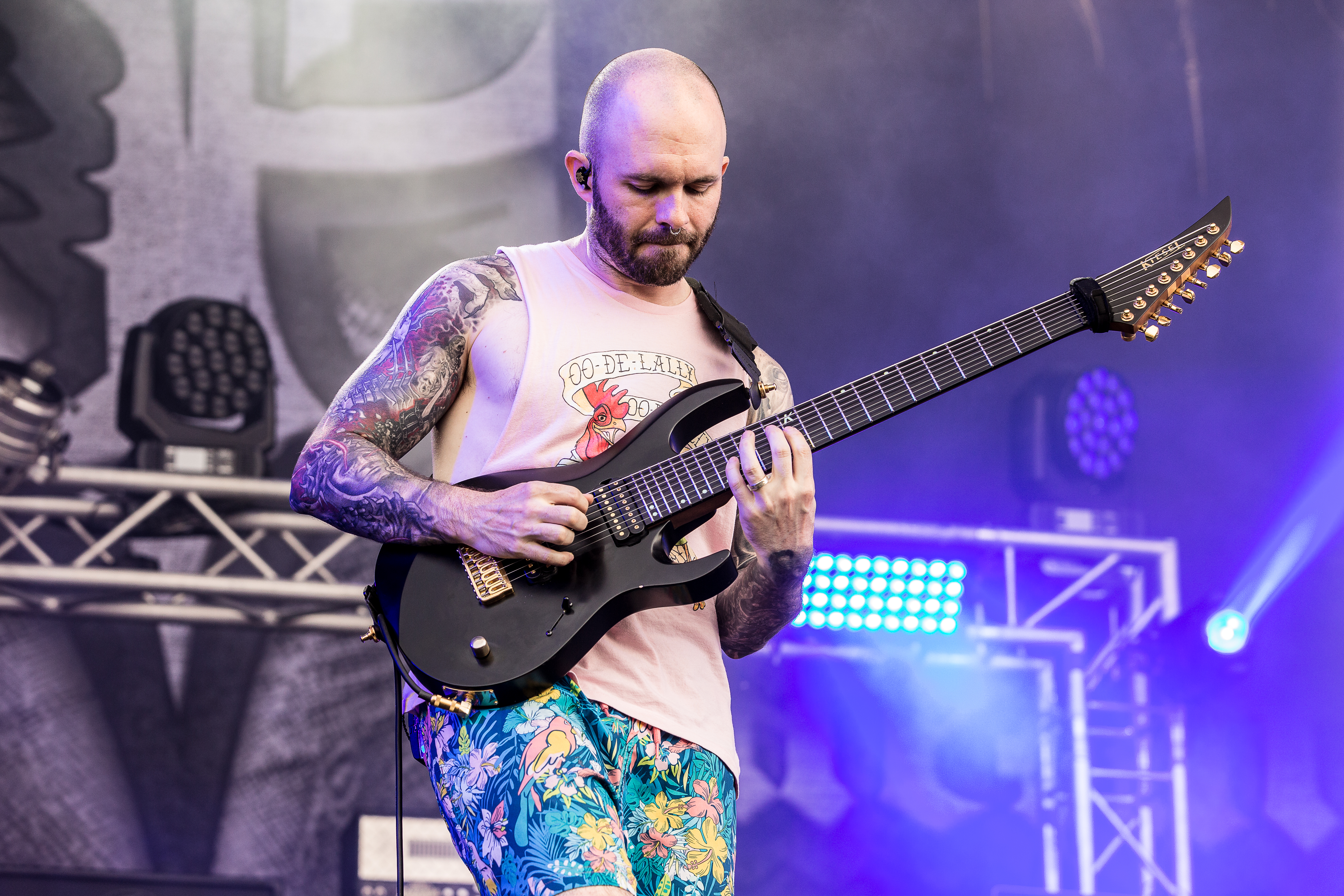
Dean Lamb

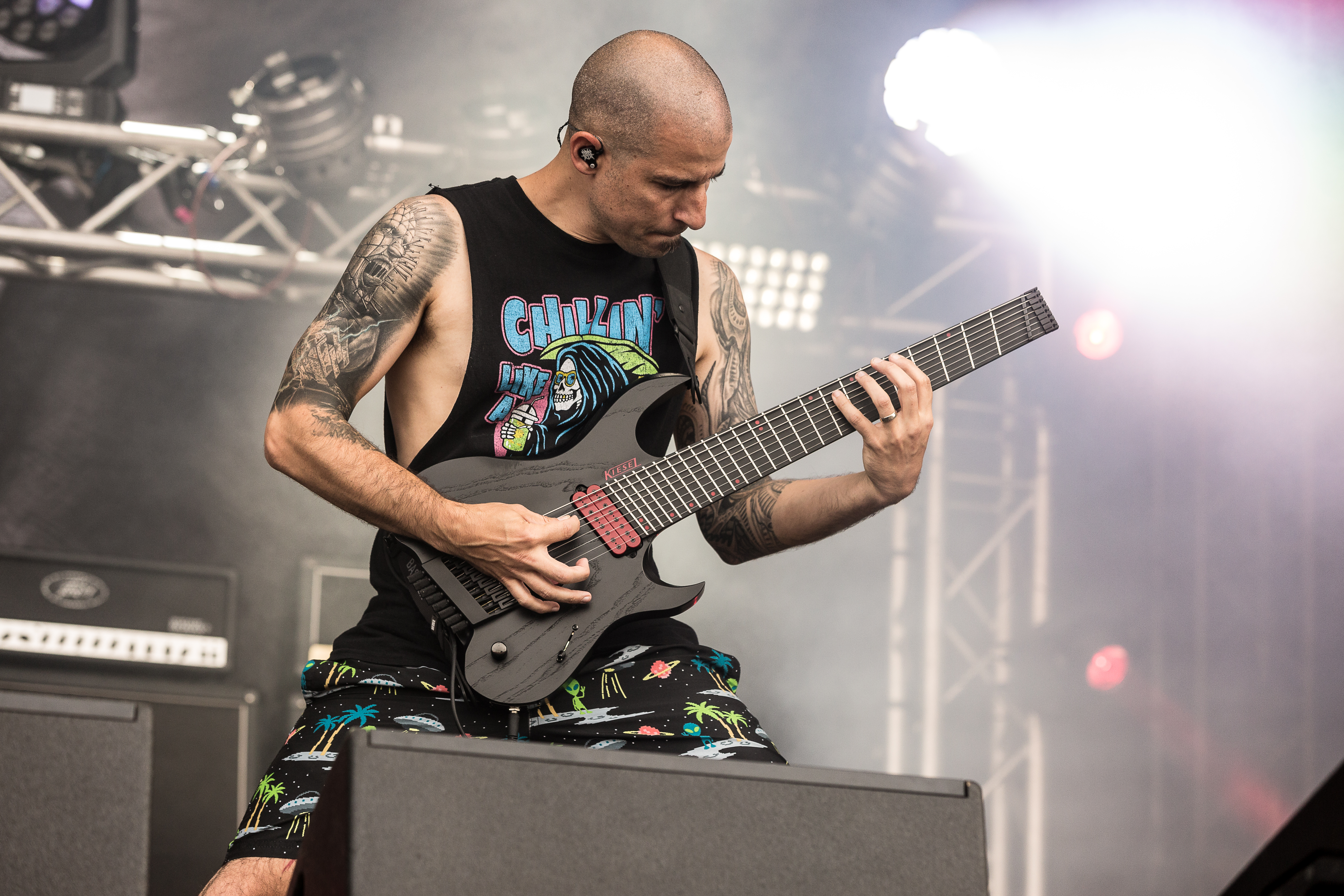
Tobi Morelli

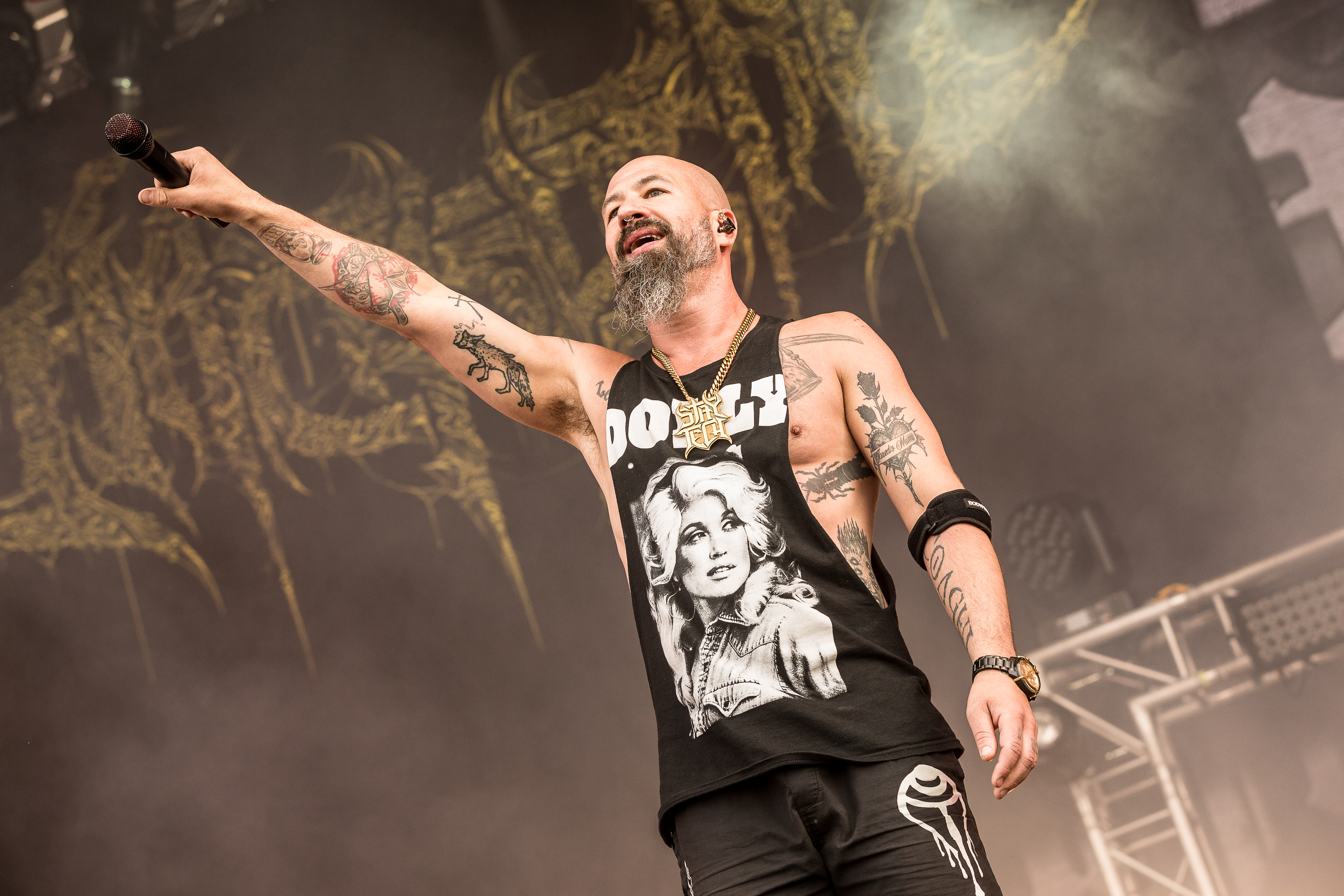
Oliver "Oli" Rae Aleron Peters

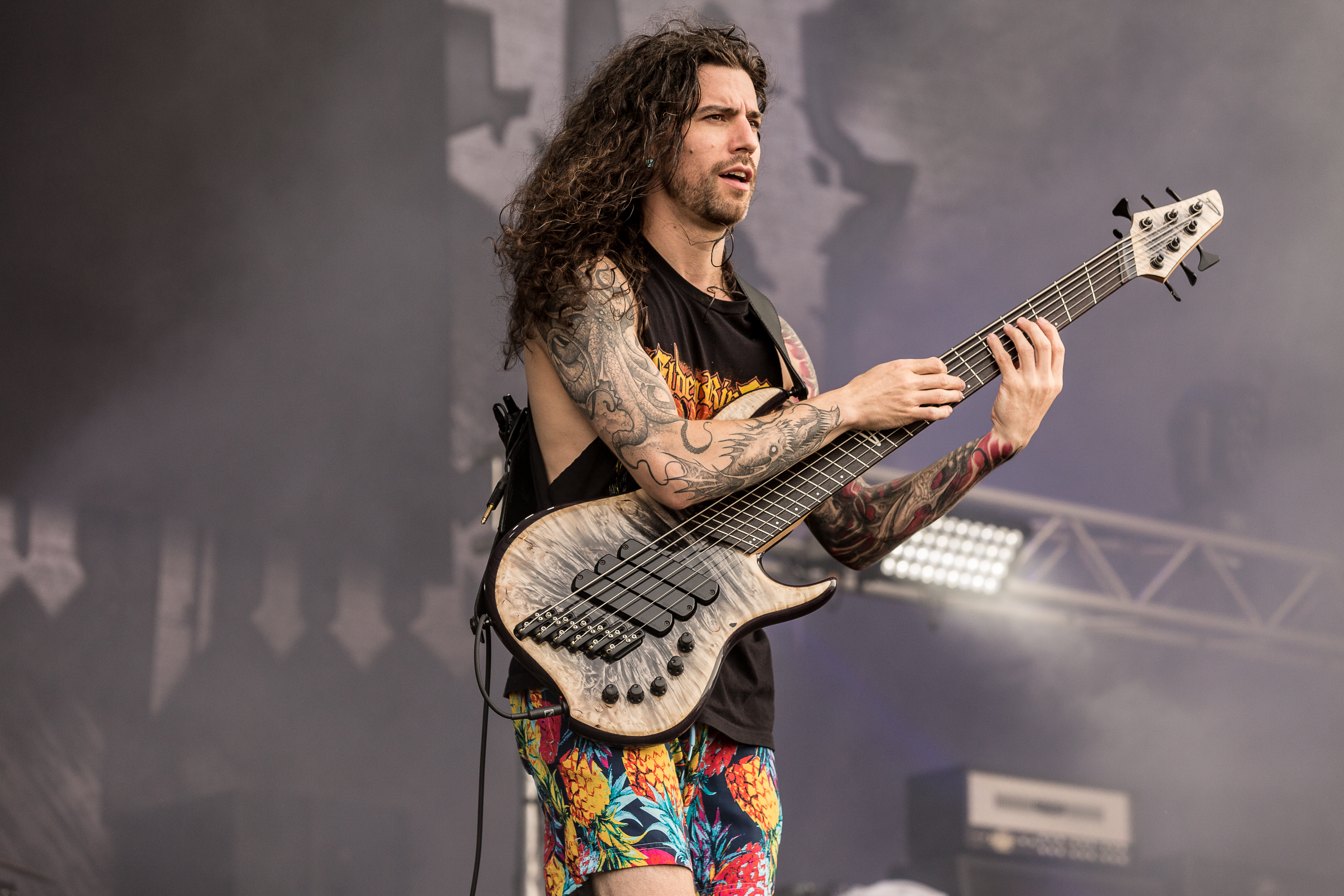
Jared Smith

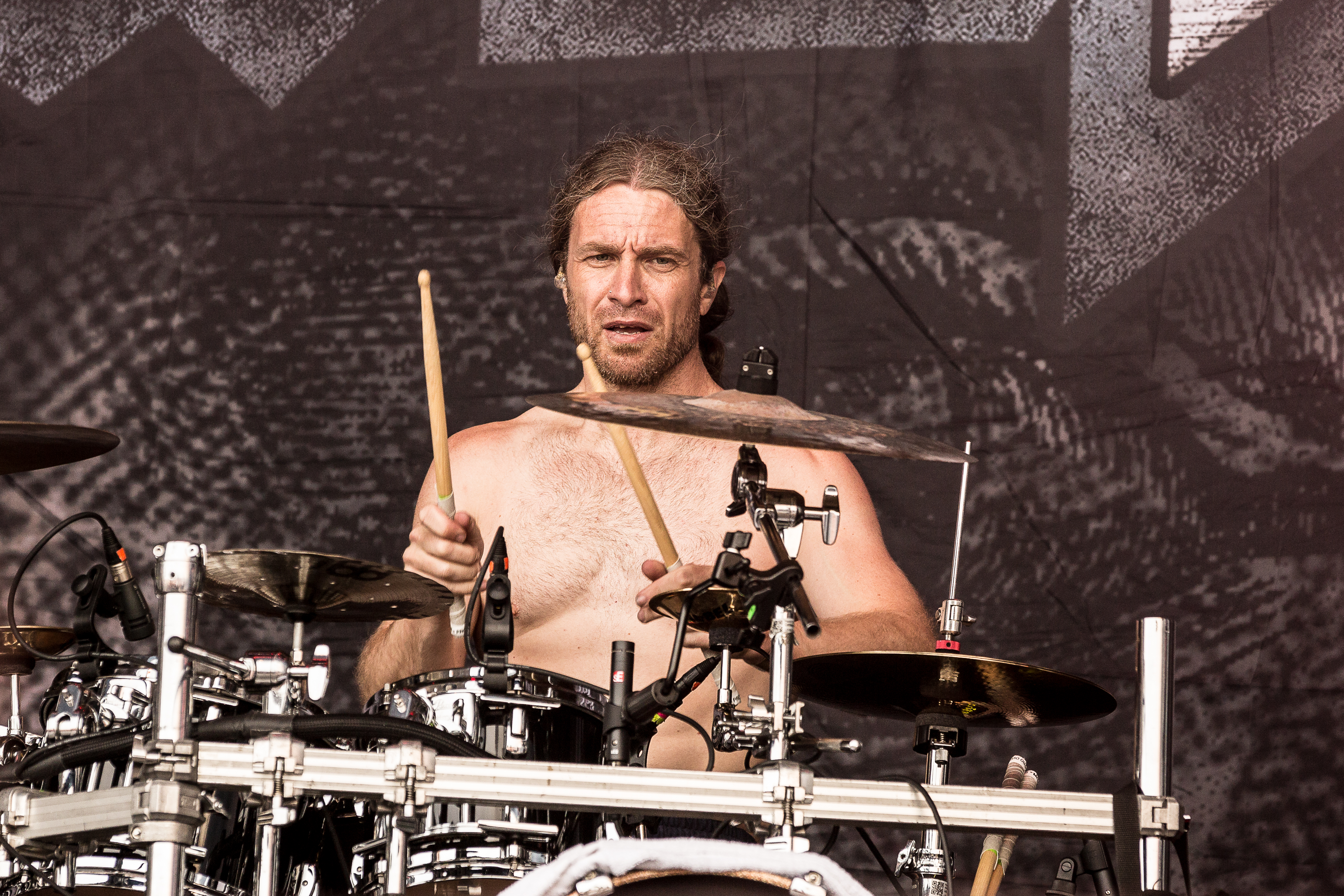
Spencer Prewett

=== Current ===
- Dean Lamb – guitar (2007–present)
- Tobi Morelli – guitar (2007–present)
- Oliver Rae Aleron Peters – vocals (2009–present)
- Jared Smith – bass (2016–present)
- Spencer Moore – drums (2025–present)

=== Former ===
- Shawn Hache – vocals (2007–2008)
- Jaron "Evil" Good – bass, backing vocals (2009–2014)
- Clayton Harder – bass (2014–2015)
- Spencer Prewett – drums (2007–2024)

== Discography ==
- All Shall Align (2011)
- The Lucid Collective (2014)
- Relentless Mutation (2017)
- Bleed the Future (2021)
- Too Fast to Die (2026)

== Awards and nominations ==
=== Juno Award ===
Year	Nominee / work	Award	Result	Ref.
2018	Relentless Mutation	Metal/Hard Music Album of the Year	Nominated	
2022	Bleed the Future	Metal/Hard Music Album of the Year	Won	

=== Western Canadian Music Awards ===
Year	Nominee / work	Award	Result	Ref.
2022	Archspire	Metal and Hard Music Artist of the Year	Won	
