= Lurking Fear =

Studio album by Mekong Delta
- Released: 31 August 2007
- Recorded: 2007
- Genres: Progressive metal, thrash metal
- Length: 49:16
- Label: AFM
- Producer: Ralph Hubert

Mekong Delta chronology
Pictures at an Exhibition (1997)	Lurking Fear (2007)	Wanderer on the Edge of Time (2010)

Professional ratings
Review scores
Source	Rating
Chronicles of Chaos	7/10
Metal Reviews	79/100
Metal Temple	8/10

Lurking Fear is the eighth album from progressive metal and thrash metal band Mekong Delta, released in August 2007. The album takes its title from the story The Lurking Fear by horror writer H. P. Lovecraft.

== Track listing ==
1. "Society in Dissolution" – 4:56
2. "Purification" – 5:06
3. "Immortal Hate (Accepting Prayers of Supremacy)" – 5:16
4. "Allegro Furioso" (taken from 'Five fragments for Group and Orchestra') – 3:07
5. "Rules of Corruption" – 5:27
6. "Ratters (Among the Dead)" – 5:04
7. "Moderato" (taken from 'Five fragments for Group and Orchestra') – 3:52
8. "Defenders of the Faith" – 7:02
9. "Symphony of Agony" – 5:08
10. "Allegro" (out of symphony #10 by Dimitri Schostakowitsch) – 4:16

== Band line-up ==
- Ralph Hubert — bass guitar, concerto guitar
- Leo Szpigiel — vocals
- Uli Kusch — drums
- Peter Lake — electric guitar, acoustic guitar

== Additional credits ==
- Ralph Hubert — producer, mixer
- Erik Grösch — mixer
- Eliran Kantor — artwork and design
