= Harnessing Ruin =

Album by Immolation

Studio album by Immolation
- Released: February 5, 2005
- Recorded: 2004
- Genre: Death metal
- Length: 43:33
- Label: Listenable
- Producer: Paul Orofino

Immolation chronology
Unholy Cult (2002)	Harnessing Ruin (2005)	Hope and Horror (2007)

Professional ratings
Review scores
Source	Rating
AllMusic	4.5/5 stars
Blabbermouth	9/10

Harnessing Ruin is the sixth album by Immolation. It was released on Listenable Records in 2005. This is the band's first album with drummer Steve Shalaty.

== Track listing ==
No.	Title	Length
1.	"Swarm of Terror"	3:14
2.	"Our Savior Sleeps"	3:37
3.	"Challenge the Storm"	3:56
4.	"Harnessing Ruin"	4:30
5.	"Dead to Me"	5:19
6.	"Son of Iniquity"	6:07
7.	"My Own Enemy"	6:45
8.	"Crown the Liar"	4:54
9.	"At Mourning's Twilight"	5:16
Total length:		43:33

== Personnel ==
Immolation

- Ross Dolan – bass, vocals
- Robert Vigna – lead guitar
- Bill Taylor – rhythm guitar
- Steve Shalaty – drums

Production

- Paul Orofino – engineering, mastering, production
- Sven – artwork, layout
