= Acts of Hate =

Studio album by Soul Demise
- Released: 17 April 2009
- Recorded: 2008
- Genre: Melodic death metal
- Length: 42:43
- Label: Remission / Soulfood
- Producer: Soul Demise

Soul Demise chronology
Blind (2005)	Acts of Hate (2009)

Acts of Hate is the 2009 album by German melodic death metal band Soul Demise. A promotional clip for the album's opener, "The Tempest", was included to Maximum Metal Vol. 138 by German magazine Metal Hammer, while the album itself features a clip for "Evidence of Spoken Words".

== Background ==
It took the band four years to release a follow-up to 2005's album Blind. Acts of Hate is the first album to feature new members Michael Dauscher on bass and Jan Sotiriu on drums.

== Reception ==
Professional ratings
Review scores
Source	Rating
Legacy	13/15 stars
Metal Hammer	6/7 stars

Dominik Winter of Metal Hammer gave the release high points, calling the band "the Swedish Germans in the metal circus" and especially recognizing Roman Zimmerhackel's vocals. This was backed up by the review in Legacy, laying its attention on the compositions of the "Bavarian Swedes", stating that they ultimately stepped out of the shadow of their idols, At the Gates. Other specialist publications were in the same vein.

== Track listing ==
1. "The Tempest"
2. "Day of Reckoning"
3. "Evidence of Spoken Words"
4. "Six Billion"
5. "Commit Suicide"
6. "Acted Out of Hate"
7. "Time Wasted is Time Lost"
8. "A Reason For Dying" (instrumental)
9. "The Game"
10. "Crows Gown"
11. "Slight Hope"
12. "In Blind Human Hate" (instrumental)
13. "Evidence of Spoken Words" (video clip)

== Personnel ==
- Roman Zimmerhackel – vocals
- Andreas Schuhmeier – guitars
- Alex Hagenauer – guitars
- Michael Dauscher – bass guitar
- Jan Sotiriu – drums
- Drums recorded by Stephan Fimemrs at Aexxys-Art
- Guitars, bass and vocals recorded at Station 24 Studios
- Engineered, mixed and mastered by Christoph Brandes at Iguana-Studios
- Cover artwork by Killustrations
- Layout by Karim Daire
- Band photo by Andreas Seitz
