= Majesty and Decay =

Studio album by Immolation
- Released: March 9, 2010
- Genre: Death metal
- Length: 45:03
- Label: Nuclear Blast
- Producer: Paul Orifino

Immolation chronology
| Shadows in the Light (2007) | Majesty and Decay (2010) | Kingdom of Conspiracy (2013) |

Majesty and Decay is Immolation's eighth full-length album, released March 9, 2010. It was recorded at New York's Millbrook Sound Studios and was produced by Paul Orofino and mixed by Zack Ohren.

Professional ratings
Review scores
| Source | Rating |
|---|---|
| About.com | 4.5/5 stars |
| All Metal Music | 9.5/10 |
| AllMusic | 3.5/5 stars |
| Blabbermouth | 9.5/10 |

== Track listing ==
| No. | Title | Length |
|---|---|---|
| 1. | "Intro" | 1:19 |
| 2. | "The Purge" | 3:19 |
| 3. | "A Token of Malice" | 2:41 |
| 4. | "Majesty and Decay" | 4:29 |
| 5. | "Divine Code" | 3:39 |
| 6. | "In Human Form" | 4:04 |
| 7. | "A Glorious Epoch" | 4:38 |
| 8. | "Interlude" | 2:04 |
| 9. | "A Thunderous Consequence" | 3:59 |
| 10. | "The Rapture of Ghosts" | 5:19 |
| 11. | "Power and Shame" | 3:44 |
| 12. | "The Comfort of Cowards" | 5:52 |
| Total length: | | 45:03 |

== Personnel ==
Immolation

- Ross Dolan – bass, vocals
- Robert Vigna – lead guitar
- Bill Taylor – rhythm guitar
- Steve Shalaty – drums

Production

- Pär Olofsson – artwork
- Zack Ohren – mixing, mastering
- Paul Orofino – engineering, tracking
- Rob Kimura – layout
- Brenden Flaherty – drum editing
- Norman DelTufo – drum tuning
