= Shadows in the Light =

Studio album by Immolation
- Released: May 8, 2007
- Recorded: November 2006 at Millbrook Sound Studios
- Genre: Death metal
- Length: 40:30
- Label: Listenable
- Producer: Paul Orifino

Immolation chronology
Hope and Horror (2007)	Shadows in the Light (2007)	Majesty and Decay (2010)

Professional ratings
Review scores
Source	Rating
About.com	4/5 stars
AllMusic	3.5/5 stars
Metal Hammer	6/10
Terrorizer Magazine	9/10

Shadows in the Light is the seventh full-length album by American death metal band Immolation. It was released on May 8, 2007, through Listenable Records.

== Track listing ==
No.	Title	Length
1.	"Hate's Plague"	2:50
2.	"Passion Kill"	3:41
3.	"World Agony"	3:55
4.	"Tarnished"	3:36
5.	"The Weight of Devotion"	4:20
6.	"Breathing the Dark"	4:00
7.	"Deliverer of Evil"	3:45
8.	"Shadows in the Light"	3:44
9.	"Lying with Demons"	4:33
10.	"Whispering Death"	6:04
Total length:		40:30

== Personnel ==
Immolation

- Ross Dolan – bass, vocals
- Robert Vigna – lead guitar
- Bill Taylor – rhythm guitar
- Steve Shalaty – drums

Production

- Paul Orofino – engineering, mastering, production
- Sven de Caluwé – artwork
