= Dances of Death (and Other Walking Shadows) =

- Cover art by Joachim Luetke

Studio album by Mekong Delta
- Released: 1990
- Genre: Progressive metal, thrash metal
- Length: 38:18
- Label: AAARRG Music
- Producer: Ralph Hubert

Mekong Delta chronology
The Principle of Doubt (1989)	Dances of Death (and Other Walking Shadows) (1990)	Kaleidoscope (1992)

Dances of Death (and Other Walking Shadows) is the fourth album from progressive thrash metal band Mekong Delta, released in 1990.

== Track listing ==
All lyrics are written by Ralph Hubert & Doug Lee; all music is composed by Ralph Hubert.

No.	Title	Length
1.	"Dances of Death: Introduction – 1:11 (0:00–1:11); Eruption – 1:34 (1:11–2:45); Beyond the Gates – 4:53 (2:45–7:38); Outburst – 1:19 (7:38–8:57); Days of Betrayal – 4:14 (8:57–13:11); Restless – 00:53 (13:11–14:04); Sanctuary – 3:01 (14:04–17:05); Finale – 2:06 (17:05–19:11)"	19:11
2.	"Transgressor"	3:18
3.	"True Believers"	5:25
4.	"Night on a Bare Mountain"	10:24

=== Remastered CD edition bonus track ===
5. "The Gnome" – 2:54

== Band line-up ==
- Doug Lee – vocals
- Uwe Baltrusch – guitars
- Ralph Hubert – bass guitar
- Jörg Michael – drums

== Additional credits ==
- Joachim Luetke – Cover art

== Notes ==
- "Night on a Bare Mountain" was originally written by the Russian composer Modest Mussorgsky.
- "The Gnome" is the 1st movement of Mussorgsky's suite Pictures at an Exhibition.
