= An Uncertain Collision =

Studio album by Acrania
- Released: 20 October 2012
- Recorded: June–July 2012
- Studio: Various: Circo Volador Studios (Mexico City, Mexico); Evolution Studios (Irapuato, Mexico)
- Genre: Progressive metal; Latin metal; technical death metal; avant-garde metal
- Length: 40:56
- Label: Acrania
- Producer: Johnny Chavez

Acrania chronology
| Unbreakable Fury (2010) | An Uncertain Collision (2012) | Fearless (2015) |

Singles from Fearless
- 1. "Treason, Politics & Death" Released: 8 January 2013

An Uncertain Collision is the second studio album by Mexican progressive metal and Latin metal band Acrania, released on October 20, 2012 with the support of Mexico's Council for Culture and Arts. A music video was released for the album's first single "Treason, Politics & Death" on January 8, 2013.

== Track listing ==
All tracks are written by Luis Oropeza except Speartooth by Félix Carreón and Revolutions & Tequila by Johnny Chavez & Ignacio Gómez Ceja.

| No. | Title | Length |
|---|---|---|
| 1. | "Treason, Politics & Death" | 4:11 |
| 2. | "Deceive The Pain" | 5:35 |
| 3. | "Now" | 5:04 |
| 4. | "A Praise To Madness" | 3:24 |
| 5. | "Revolutions & Tequila" | 0:44 |
| 6. | "But Not Today" | 7:04 |
| 7. | "Speartooth" | 5:22 |
| 8. | "Vallarta Nights" | 2:09 |
| 9. | "In My Land" | 7:23 |
| Total length: | | 40:56 |

== Personnel ==
Acrania

- Luis Oropeza – Vocals, Guitars
- Johnny Chavez – Drums
- Félix Carreón – Guitars
- Alberto Morales – Bass
- Ignacio Gómez Ceja – Percussion

Additional musicians

- Lucas Moreno – Flute, Sax
- Oscar Pineda – Trombone
- Said Cuevas – Trumpet
- Julián Roberto Flores Millán – Trumpet
- Alan Hernández Varela – Trumpet
- David Contreras Cortés – Sax
  Professional ratings
  Review scores
  | Source | Rating |
  |---|---|
  | Bravewords | 8/10 |
  | Metal Temple | 9/10 |

Production and design

- Johnny Chavez – production, engineering, mixing
- Acrania – production, music arrangement
- Jesús Bravo – Mastering
- Eliran Kantor – artwork
- Darío Baez – photography
