= Dawn of Possession =

Studio album by Immolation
- Released: July 16, 1991; April 24, 2006 (re-issue)
- Recorded: Musiclab Studios, Berlin, Germany
- Genre: Death metal
- Length: 42:44
- Label: Roadrunner
- Producer: Harris Johns

Immolation chronology
Dawn of Possession (1991)	Stepping on Angels... Before Dawn (1995)

Professional ratings
Review scores
Source	Rating
AllMusic	3.5/5 stars

Dawn of Possession is the debut album by Immolation. Released on July 16, 1991, it was their first and only album on Roadrunner Records. The album was re-issued and re-mastered by Metal Mind Productions as a limited-edition digipak, on April 24, 2006, with bonus videos. The album was recorded at Musiclab Studios in Berlin, Germany and was produced by Harris Johns.

== Music and lyrics ==
Dawn of Possession has been described as a "frightening and wraith-like condemnation of Christianity." The album was written between 1988 and 1991, six of the songs having been demoed between 1988 and 1989, with the rest written in the two years after. The guitars are tuned to C Standard, though the band members did not know that during writing and rehearsals, since they did not have guitar tuners. Guitarists Ross Dolan and Robert Vigna tuned their guitars by ear, and Wilkinson emulated their intonation. Vigna explained, "I knew how to tune the guitar itself, and we could all tune our instruments, but never really paid attention to what key we were in. We knew we wanted to make things heavier, so we probably just tuned down more and more as time went on, not realizing just how much we did. That being said, whatever it was that I was tuning to, that's what it was."

== Legacy ==
Greg Prato of AllMusic assessed, "Although it will never go down in metal history as a landmark album à la Master of Puppets or Reign in Blood, Dawn of Possession does show a band mastering a style that would eventually become quite commonplace in metal. [...] Looking back on it years later, Dawn of Possession was certainly a notable release in what would eventually be known as the "extreme metal" style."

== Track listing ==
- All songs written by Immolation.

No.	Title	Length
1.	"Into Everlasting Fire"	5:10
2.	"Despondent Souls"	4:13
3.	"Dawn of Possession"	3:04
4.	"Those Left Behind"	5:13
5.	"Internal Decadence"	2:59
6.	"No Forgiveness (Without Bloodshed)"	4:11
7.	"Burial Ground"	3:36
8.	"After My Prayers"	5:51
9.	"Fall in Disease"	3:47
10.	"Immolation"	4:05
Total length:		42:44

== Personnel ==
Immolation

- Ross Dolan - bass, vocals
- Robert Vigna - lead guitar
- Tom Wilkinson - rhythm guitar
- Craig Smilowski - drums

Production

- Andreas Marschall - cover art
- Carole Segal - photography
- Harris Johns - engineering, mixing, producer
- Patricia Mooney - art direction
- Mark Mastro - logo
- Renato Gallina - artwork (original logo concept)
