= Baliset (band) =

American hard rock band

- Origin: Boston, Massachusetts, USA
- Genres: Experimental music Hard rock Heavy metal
- Years active: 1996–present
- Label: Ret Con Recordings
- Members: Greg Massi; Adam Letourneau; Lauren Flaherty; Rob Macleod
- Past members: Dana Chisholm

Baliset is an American hard rock / heavy metal band based in Boston, Massachusetts, and is the project of Greg Massi, known for his work with the avant-garde bands maudlin of the Well and Kayo Dot.

== Background ==
Greg Massi began developing solo material under the moniker "Baliset" in 1996. From 1999-2006, along with college friend, drummer Adam Letourneau, Massi would go on to write and record songs for the project.

Massi left Kayo Dot in 2006, allowing him to concentrate his efforts on Baliset with Letourneau. They released a limited edition, 5-song demo called Black Light Moon later that year.

== A Time for Rust ==
In March 2009, Baliset's first album entitled A Time for Rust, was released digitally, and a few months later on CD, to generally favorable reviews. The album contained 8 songs, all of which were written and recorded between 2003-8 by Massi and Letourneau, with the assistance of several guest musicians, including fellow Kayo Dot alumnus Forbes Graham. The album artwork was provided by Eliran Kantor, known for his work for metal bands such as Testament and Aghora. The album was recorded and mixed at Zing Studios, with additional mastering and engineering at Menegroth The Thousand Caves studio by Colin Marston in Queens, NY. The album's release was followed by a few shows in the Boston area by the live incarnation of the band, and the band continues to play live occasionally.

In October 2009, it was announced that Lauren Flaherty, who performed guest vocals on A Time for Rust, joined Baliset as the official lead singer.

== Discography ==
- Black Light Moon (2006) (demo, limited to 200 copies)
- A Time for Rust (2009)

== Band members ==
=== Current members ===
- Greg Massi - vocals, guitar, keyboards
- Adam Letourneau - drums, percussion
- Shannon Kelly - vocals
- Rob Macleod - bass

=== Guest and session musicians ===
- T.L. Conrad - bass guitar
- John Battema - keyboards
- Jim Fogarty - keyboards, percussion, piano
- Forbes Graham - trumpet

=== Previous members ===
- Dana Chisholm - bass guitar (live)
- Lauren Flaherty - vocals
