= Immolation (band) =

American death metal band

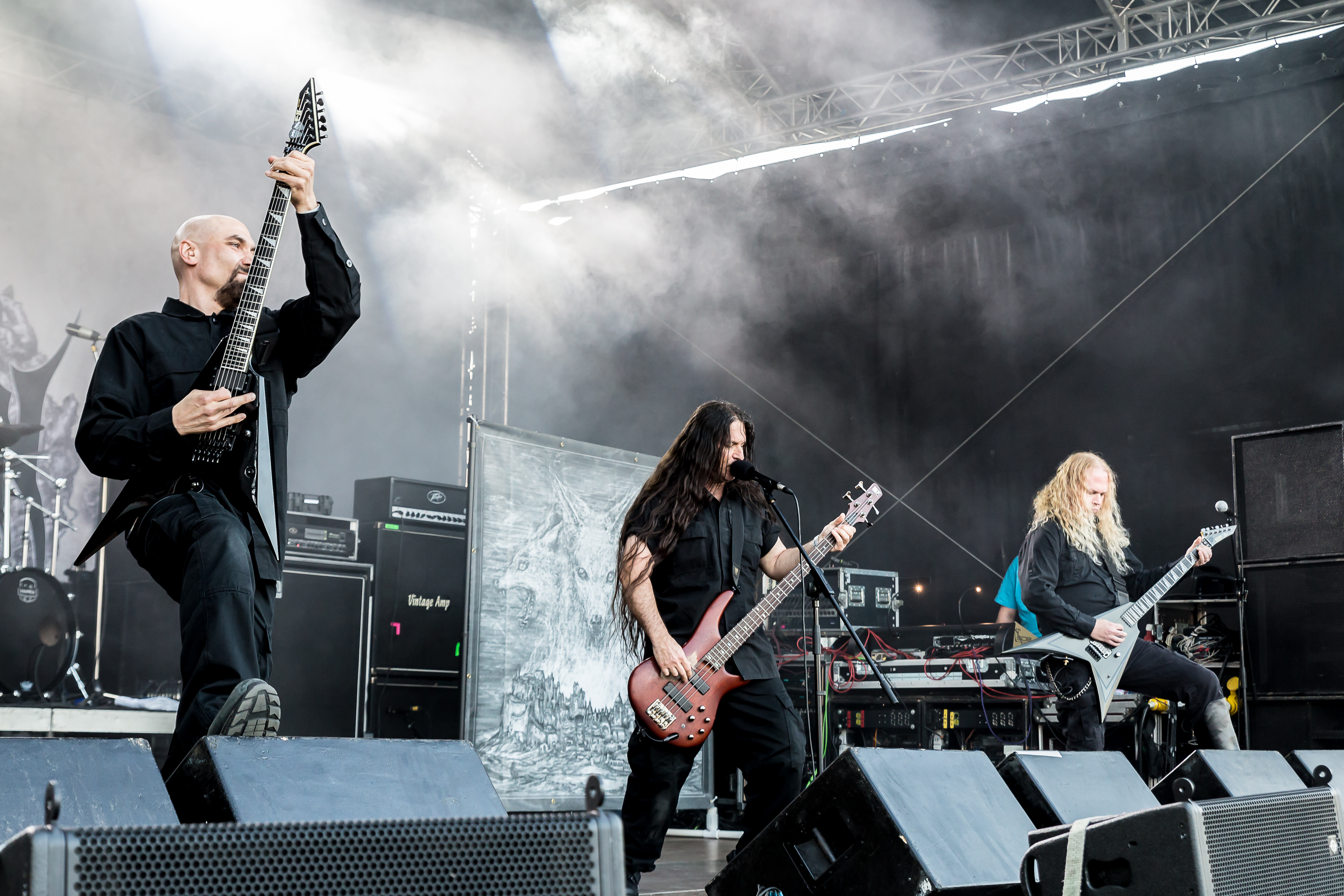
- Immolation at Metal Frenzy in 2019

Background information
- Also known as: Rigor Mortis (1986–1988)
- Origin: Yonkers, New York, U.S.
- Genre: Death metal
- Years active: 1986–present
- Labels: Roadrunner, Metal Blade, Listenable, Nuclear Blast
- Members: Robert Vigna; Ross Dolan; Steve Shalaty; Alex Bouks
- Past members: Thomas Wilkinson; Neal Boback; Craig Smilowski; Alex Hernandez; Bill Taylor
- Website: immolation.info

Immolation is an American death metal band from Yonkers, New York, formed in 1986 as Rigor Mortis. They are considered leaders of the New York death metal scene along with Incantation, Mortician and Suffocation. Currently, Immolation consists of founding members Robert Vigna (lead guitar), Ross Dolan (vocals, bass), Steve Shalaty (drums), and Alex Bouks (rhythm guitar). They have released 12 studio albums, the latest being Descent on April 10, 2026.

== History ==
Immolation was founded after the dissolution of Rigor Mortis, a New Yorker band formed in May 1986 by Andrew Sakowicz (bass guitar, vocals) Dave Wilkinson (drums), and Robert Vigna (guitar). After recording the Decomposed and Warriors of Doom demos, Sakowicz left the band in early 1988 and was replaced with Ross Dolan, and the band's name was changed to Immolation. The new lineup put out two studio demos, in 1988 and 1989, and gained a worldwide following in the underground death metal scene. Immolation signed a deal with Roadrunner Records and released their debut album, Dawn of Possession, in 1991. After leaving Roadrunner, the band released "Stepping on Angels," a compilation of demo releases and live tracks. In 1995, the band signed to Metal Blade Records and released three albums, Here in After, Failures for Gods, and Close to a World Below. After their second album, drummer Craig Smilowski left the band and Alex Hernandez replaced him. Their next three albums, Unholy Cult, Harnessing Ruin, and Shadows in the Light, were released by French label Listenable Records and Century Media in the US.

In May 2001, Immolation headlined a European tour with supporting bands Deranged, Deströyer 666, Decapitated and Soul Demise. Unholy Cult saw the guitarist Thomas Wilkinson's departure and the addition of ex-Angelcorpse guitarist Bill Taylor. Steve Shalaty replaced Hernandez on Harnessing Ruin. In February 2008, Immolation toured the US alongside bands such as Rotting Christ, Belphegor and Averse Sefira. In January and February 2010, Immolation toured with headliner Nile along with Krisiun, Rose Funeral, and Dreaming Dead.

In March 2010, Immolation released Majesty and Decay through Nuclear Blast. In 2011, they released the five-track Providence EP through Scion A/V as a free download. In May 2013, Immolation released Kingdom of Conspiracy via Nuclear Blast, and toured with Cannibal Corpse and Napalm Death on a tour sponsored by Decibel Magazine. At the end of 2016, Bill Taylor left the band for personal reasons, and Alex Bouks replaced him. In 2017, Immolation released their tenth full-length album, Atonement. That same year, they supported Mayhem on their tour of North America with Black Anvil. They toured North America two years later with Blood Incantation. In 2022, Immolation released their eleventh full-length album, Acts of God. In the spring of 2023, the band supported Obituary on their tour of North America with Blood Incantation and Ingrown. They played at Milwaukee Metal Fest in May of that year.

Immolation announced their twelfth studio album, Descent, in January 2026, alongside a European tour in February with Mayhem and Marduk and a North American tour supporting Behemoth alongside Rotting Christ and Deicide, scheduled to start after the album's April 10 release.

== Artistry ==
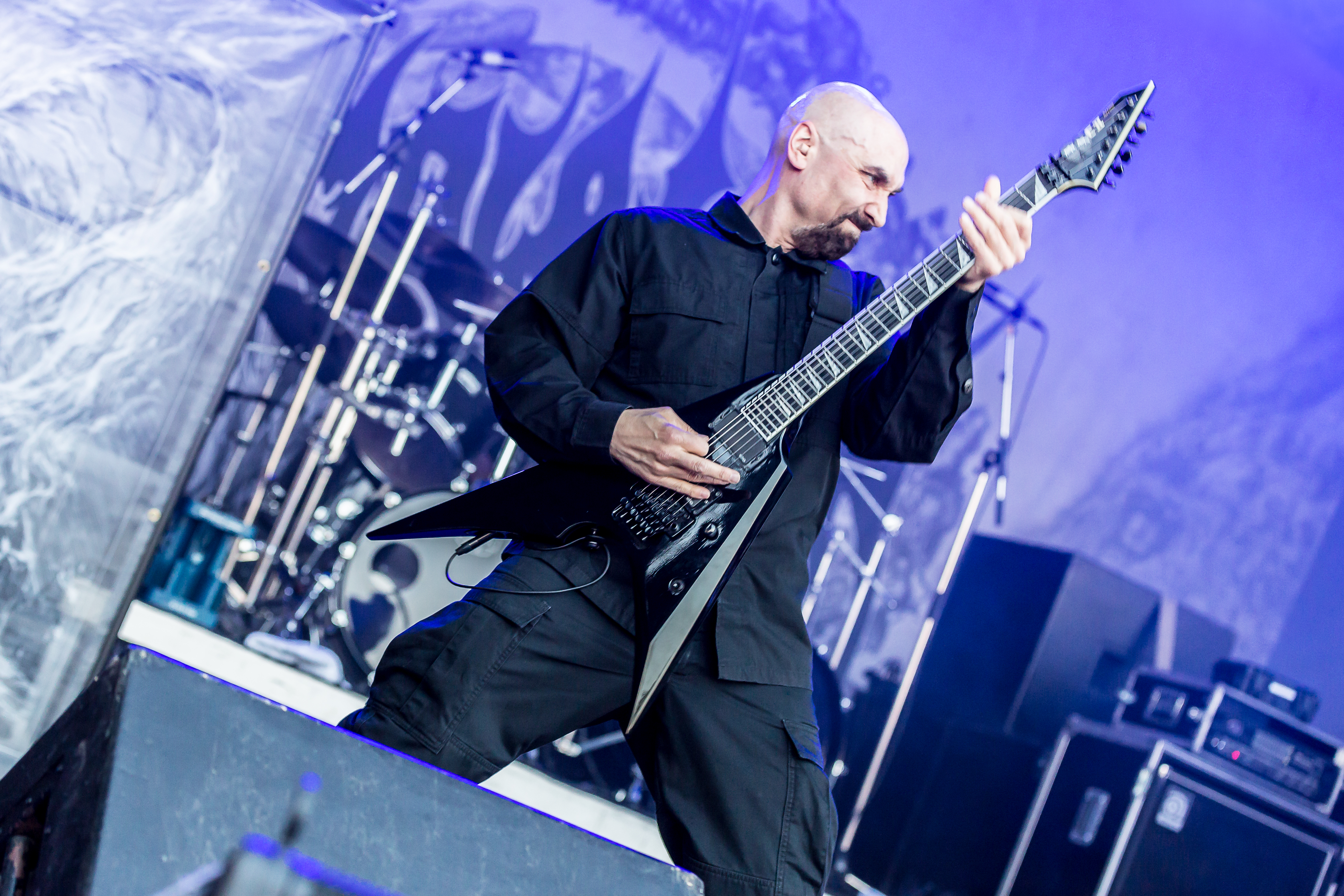
Robert Vigna performing in 2019.

=== Musical style and instrumentation ===
Immolation uses riffs written in dissonant harmonic patterns, often dueling between the two guitars, typically over complex rhythm and drum patterns. Their riffs are often a combination of tremolo picking, rapid power chord changes and pinched harmonics to create a wall of sound that many other bands have attempted to emulate. The band's guitar parts are often complex and technically proficient; drum parts are often written to follow the guitar riffs in a way that is unusual for most death metal.

Guitarist Robert Vigna and vocalist/bassist Ross Dolan have been the only constant members throughout the band's history.

=== Lyrics ===
Immolation's lyrics from Dawn of Possession to Unholy Cult explore themes of anti-religion, namely anti-Christianity. Beginning with Harnessing Ruin, there were more lyrics touching on other subjects such as politics. Bassist/vocalist Ross Dolan explained that the band's shift in lyrical content was motivated by current events. In particular, the September 11 attacks happened around the release of Unholy Cult, and Dolan had family members that were killed. The feeling that the world would never be the same afterwards led to them exploring "the darker side of humanity" beyond religion.

The band once again explored themes of anti-religion on their eleventh album Acts of God, and Dolan felt the topic of religion was approached in a new and fresh way this time. He was influenced by how religion is still significant for people, with the band having always enjoyed exploring the mindset, how it affects people, the institutions, corruption, and atrocities done for religious reasons. The band had encountered people who disagreed with their anti-religious sentiment but still respected it, with Dolan attributing it to the band attacking religious institutions over personal spirituality. Dolan stated he respects people's right to believe, but takes issue with when religion enters the lives of those who do not believe, such as when it dictates how laws are passed.

== Legacy and influence ==
Immolation, along with Incantation, helped bring the New York death metal scene to the attention of the underground, and are noted for their contributions to the genre as a whole. Hence, they are considered one of the most influential American death metal bands. The band's debut album is frequently cited as being an important and highly influential album in the genre, having laid down the blueprint that bands such as Cryptopsy and Suffocation would follow with their respective debuts.

== Members ==
=== Current lineup ===
- Robert Vigna – lead guitar (1986–present)
- Ross Dolan – bass, vocals (1988–present)
- Steve Shalaty – drums (2003–present)
- Alex Bouks – rhythm guitar (2016–present)

=== Former members ===
- Andrew Sakowicz – bass, vocals (1986–1988)
- Dave Wilkinson – drums (1986–1988; died 2018)
- Thomas Wilkinson – rhythm guitar (1987–2001)
- Max Capshaw – drums (1988)
- Neal Boback – drums (1988–1989)
- Craig Smilowski – drums (1989–1996)
- Alex Hernandez – drums (1996–2003)
- Bill Taylor – rhythm guitar (2001–2016)

=== Former live musicians ===
- John McEntee – rhythm guitar (1999, 2001)
- Ronnie Parmer – drums (2015)

== Discography ==
=== Studio albums ===
- Dawn of Possession (1991)
- Here in After (1996)
- Failures for Gods (1999)
- Close to a World Below (2000)
- Unholy Cult (2002)
- Harnessing Ruin (2005)
- Shadows in the Light (2007)
- Majesty and Decay (2010)
- Kingdom of Conspiracy (2013)
- Atonement (2017)
- Acts of God (2022)
- Descent (2026)

=== EPs ===
- Hope and Horror (EP + DVD, 2007)
- Providence (EP, 2011)

=== DVD ===
- Bringing Down the World (DVD, 2004)

=== Compilation ===
- Stepping on Angels... Before Dawn (1995)

=== Book ===
- Into Everlasting Fire: The Official History of Immolation (2024)
