= Failures for Gods =

Studio album by Immolation
- Released: June 1, 1999
- Recorded: Recorded at Millbrook Sound Studios - Millbrook, NY - July 1998
- Genre: Death metal
- Length: 40:16
- Label: Metal Blade
- Producer: Paul Orofino and Immolation

Immolation chronology
Here in After (1996)	Failures for Gods (1999)	Close to a World Below (2000)

Professional ratings
Review scores
Source	Rating
AllMusic	3/5 stars

Failures for Gods is the third album by American death metal band Immolation. It was released on Metal Blade Records in 1999.

== Track listing ==
All songs written by Immolation.

No.	Title	Length
1.	"Once Ordained"	5:21
2.	"No Jesus, No Beast"	4:41
3.	"Failures for Gods"	6:25
4.	"Unsaved"	4:36
5.	"God Made Filth"	3:57
6.	"Stench of High Heaven"	4:23
7.	"Your Angel Died"	5:25
8.	"The Devil I Know"	5:24
Total length:		40:16

== Personnel ==
Immolation

- Ross Dolan – bass, vocals
- Robert Vigna – lead guitar
- Thomas Wilkinson – rhythm guitar
- Alex Hernandez – drums

Production

- Brian Ames – design, layout
- Andreas Marschall – cover art
- Paul Orofino – engineering, producer
- Brad Vance – mastering
- John Vigna – back cover graphics, icon enhancements
- Jeff Wolfe – photography
