= Unholy Cult =

Studio album by Immolation
- Released: October 28, 2002
- Recorded: Millbrook Sound Studios, May 2002
- Genre: Death metal
- Length: 41:27
- Label: Listenable
- Producer: Paul Orofino and Immolation

Immolation chronology
Close to a World Below (2000)	Unholy Cult (2002)	Harnessing Ruin (2005)

Professional ratings
Review scores
Source	Rating
AllMusic	2/5 stars
Pitchfork	7.4/10

Unholy Cult is the fifth album by death metal band Immolation. It was released on Listenable Records in 2002. It is the band's last album with drummer Alex Hernandez. The album was inducted into Decibel's Hall of Fame.

== Track listing ==
All songs written by Ross Dolan and Robert Vigna.

No.	Title	Length
1.	"Of Martyrs and Men"	5:25
2.	"Sinful Nature"	3:16
3.	"Unholy Cult"	8:02
4.	"Wolf Among the Flock"	3:49
5.	"Reluctant Messiah"	4:58
6.	"A Kingdom Divided"	4:16
7.	"Rival the Eminent"	5:35
8.	"Bring Them Down"	6:06
Total length:		41:27

== Personnel ==
Immolation

- Ross Dolan – bass, vocals
- Robert Vigna – lead guitar
- Bill Taylor – rhythm guitar
- Alex Hernandez – drums

Production

- Andreas Marschall – cover artwork
- Paul Orofino – engineering, mastering, production
- Jeff Wolfe – band photography
- Sven – additional layout
