= Mekong Delta (band) =

German metal band

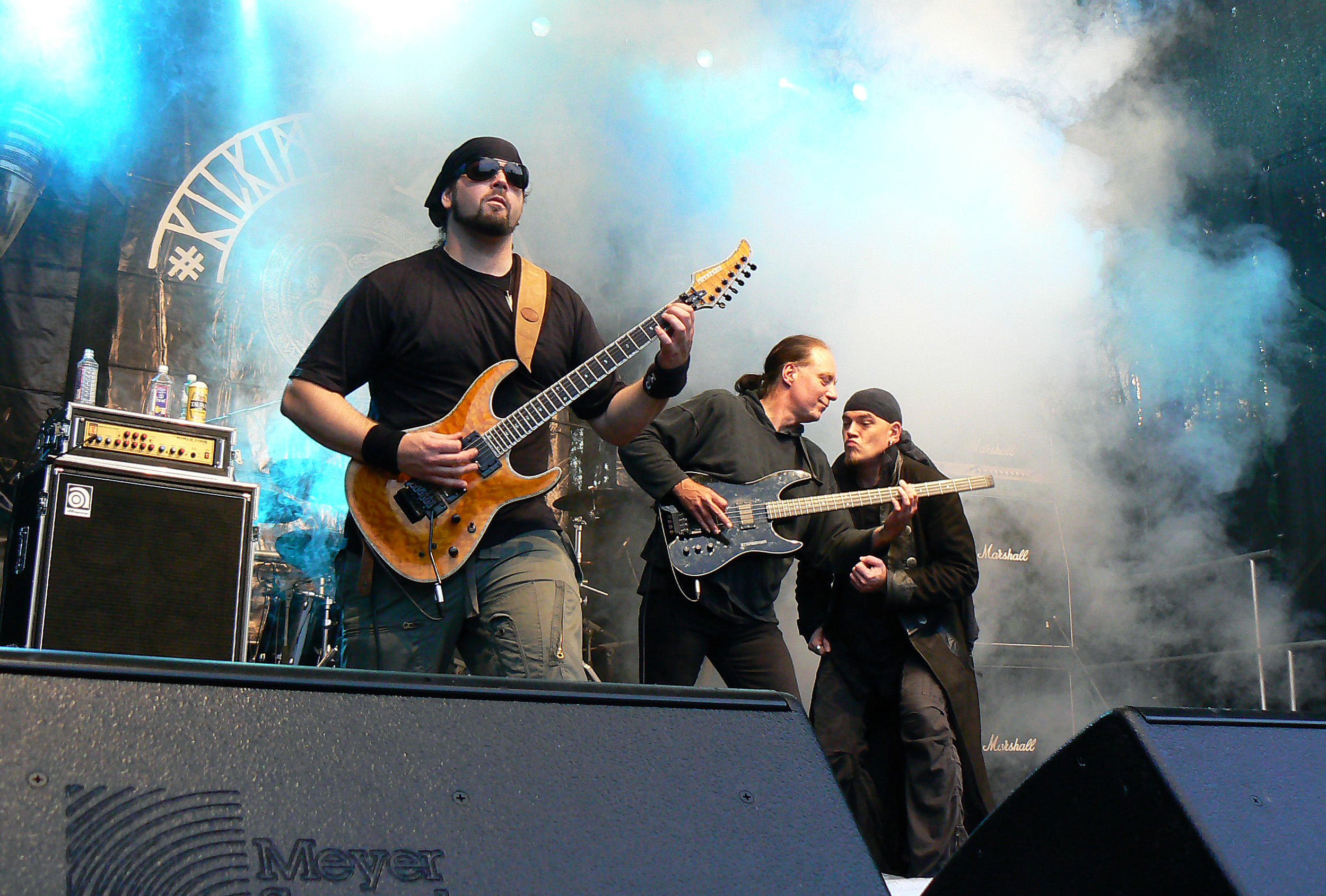
- "Kilkim žaibu XII" festival, Lithuania, 2011

Background information
- Origin: Berlin, Germany
- Genres: Thrash metal; progressive metal
- Years active: 1985–1997; 2006–present
- Label: Aaarrg
- Members: Ralph Hubert; Martin LeMar; Erik Adam H. Grösch; Alex Landenburg; Peter Lake
- Past members: Wolfgang Borgmann; Jochen Schroeder; Frank Fricke; Reiner Kelch; Georg Syrmbos; Peter "Peavy" Wagner; Jörg Michael; Uli Kusch; Peter Haas; Doug Lee; Uwe Baltrusch; Leo Szpigiel; Benedikt Zimniak
- Website: mekongdelta.eu

Mekong Delta is a German thrash/progressive metal band formed by Ralf Hubert in 1985. The band members initially kept their identities a secret, assuming that German musicians would not be accepted internationally. The band's debut album, Mekong Delta, was released in 1987, followed by several other albums, lineup changes, and a hiatus. In 2007, they released the album Lurking Fear, and in 2014, they released In a Mirror Darkly.

== History ==
The band was founded by a group of German metal musicians with the goal to "musically outshine" all then-current, independent releases. The line-up and the history of the group was to be "the best kept secret in the world". The project participants decided to keep everything about the band a secret, assuming German musicians would not be accepted internationally. The initial name "Zardoz" was rejected, followed by the acceptance of the name "Mekong Delta", named after a riverbed in Vietnam. The entire project was started by Ralf Hubert, sound-engineer for Warlock, Steeler and Living Death, and owner of the record label Aaarrg Music.

The first demos were recorded with the following line-up:

- Jochen Schroeder (ex-Rage) – guitar
- Peavy Wagner (Rage) – bass
- Jörg Michael (ex-Rage and Paganini) – drums
- Wolfgang Borgmann – vocals

Jochen Schroeder did not fit in and was soon replaced by Living Death guitarists Reiner Kelch and Frank Fricke. When Wagner later left the project, Hubert overtook the bass guitar duties. Since the band was deliberately shrouded in mystery, all participants assumed artist names and the line-up of the debut album included:

- Björn Eklund (real name Ralf Hubert) on bass and acoustic guitar
- Gordon Perkins (real name Jörg Michael) on drums and percussion
- Rolf Stein (real name Frank Fricke) on guitar and backing vocals
- Vincent St. Johns (real name Reiner Kelch) on guitar and backing vocals
- Keil (real name Wolfgang Borgmann) on vocals

=== Debut album ===
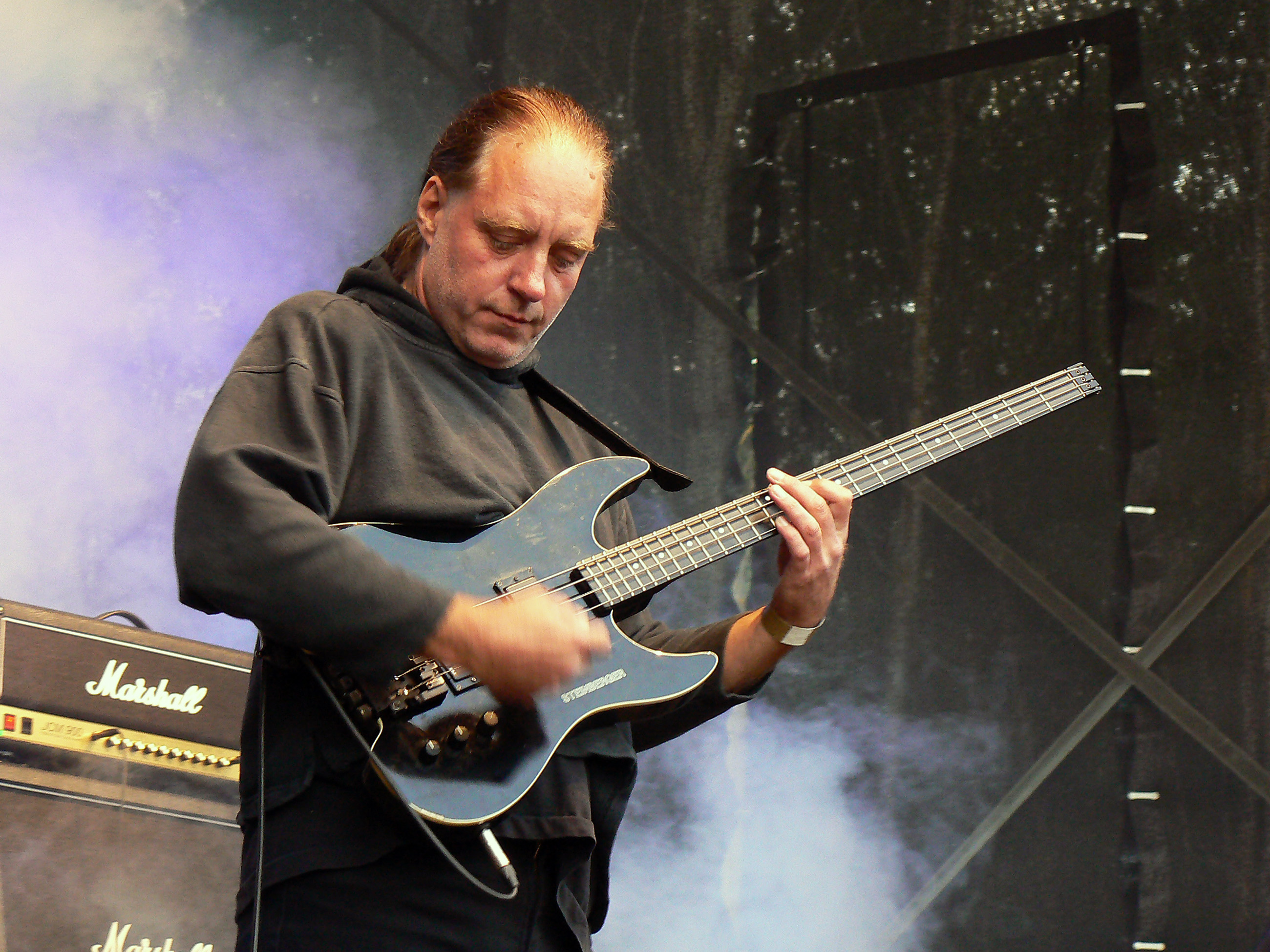
Ralph Hubert, founder of the band

The debut album Mekong Delta was released in 1987, produced by Ralf Hubert. Due to touring duties with his current band, Jörg Michael was replaced by Uli Kusch (using the name Patrick Duval) for the shortly thereafter following picture disc EP The Gnome.

Mekong Delta returned to the studio around new year 1987–1988, and recorded the concept album The Music of Erich Zann, with the same line-up, again produced by Hubert. Due to, or because of, the chosen obfuscated identities the band's big breakthrough did not happen. The album's title was taken from the story of the same name, The Music of Erich Zann by horror writer H. P. Lovecraft. Ralf Hubert has always been a big fan of Lovecraft's writings.

Reiner Kelch was replaced by Uwe Baltrusch, who used the name Mark Kaye, and at the end of 1988 Mekong Delta released the 12-inch EP Toccata, and in the spring of 1989 The Principle of Doubt was released. Fricke then left the band to focus on other musical styles, and the group decided not to replace him, as Baltrusch was able to play all guitar parts himself.

During this period the band composed "Rondo for Rockgroup", ultimately released as the suite "Dances of Death". While recording the album, Wolfgang Borgmann left the band because he could not identify himself with the material of this album. He was replaced by the American Doug Lee, former singer of the band Siren. This line-up finished recording the album Dances of Death (and Other Walking Shadows). The album included an arrangement of Modest Mussorgsky's tone poem Night on Bald Mountain. After recording this album, Jörg Michael left the band and was replaced by Swiss drummer Peter Haas.

=== Live performances ===
Around this time, the self-imposed mystery surrounding the project was fading and in October 1991 they started touring parts of Europe, including the Netherlands and Germany. The CD Live at an Exhibition was recorded on 13 October 1991 in Germany. Guitarist Georg Syrmbos was hired to be able to perform the songs live.

Kaleidoscope, released in 1992, contains a cover version of "Dance on a Volcano" originally by prog-rock band Genesis. The 1993 collection Classics contains nearly all classical pieces Hubert arranged by the band. The only classical track missing on this album is "Sabre Dance", which can be found on the previous Kaleidoscope album.

In 1994 Mekong Delta released Visions Fugitives. The compositions are somewhat similar to The Principle of Doubt and Dances of Death. The album also contains a classically oriented six-part track.

After a two-year break the band released Pictures at an Exhibition in 1996. The album contained the title piece by classical composer Modest Mussorgski, arranged for the band. The track was included twice; the first 16 tracks are played by the band, while the last 16 tracks include the band and orchestra. Because the album is completely instrumental, Doug is not mentioned on the album. Shortly thereafter a CD-ROM was released including information about Mekong Delta, Modest Mussorgski and various fan-related information.

=== Hiatus and regrouping ===
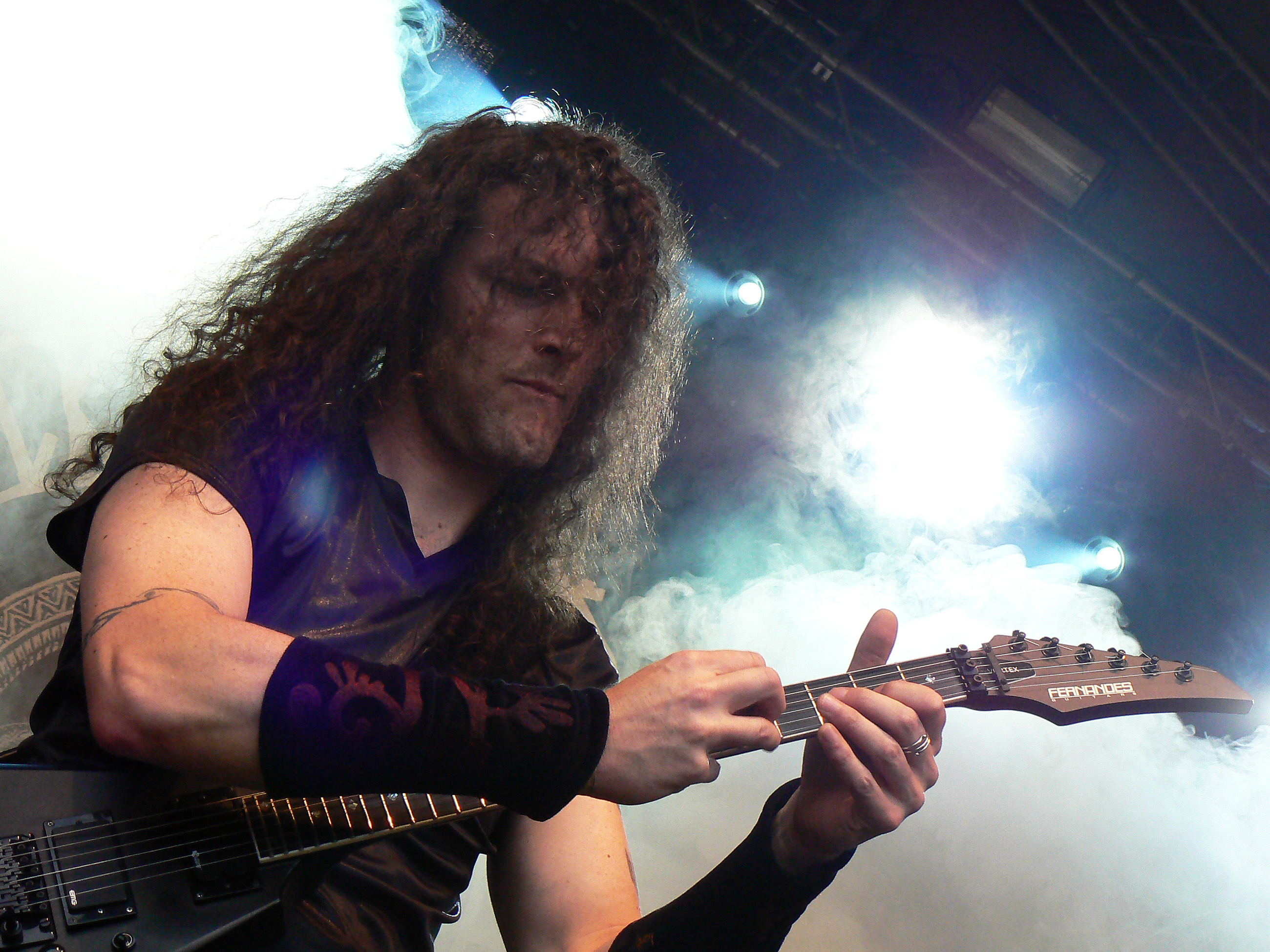
Erik Adam H. Grösch

In 1997 and 1998 the first six studio albums were remixed by Erik Adam H. Grösch and Hubert and re-released. Some albums were sonically improved, others were hardly changed. After this the band went on a long hiatus. Rumors started circulating that Hubert had fled to Greece or Turkey, or even that he had died. At the end of 2005 Hubert was brought in contact with guitarist Peter Lake from Swedish metal band Theory in Practice and the project restarted. At first Peter Haas agreed to return as drummer of the project, but he later resigned. Erstwhile member Uli Kusch stepped in as drummer. A singer was being sought after and enough material seemed to be ready for a new album. Eventually, former Crows and Wolf Spider singer Leo Szpigiel was added to the line-up. This line-up recorded the album Lurking Fear, which was released on 31 August 2007. (This was the second of the band's albums to be named after a story by H. P. Lovecraft, the first being 1988's "The Music of Erich Zann"). Due to the busy time schedule of the members, planning tour dates became infeasible.

Halfway through 2008, Ralf decided to look for members who were able to tour with the band. Very soon (thanks to Uli Kusch), Alexander Landenburg was recruited as the new drummer. Martin LeMar followed soon after to take care of the vocals. Benedict Zimniak and Erik Grösch were added as guitarists to complete the band. In 2009 plans were made to record a new studio album with the line-up that came to be and in June 2010 Wanderer on the Edge of Time was released. Also a video clip was made of the song "King with Broken Crown".

On 29 January 2014, it was announced that Mekong Delta was going to release a new album. The album In a Mirror Darkly was released on 23 April of that year.

== Members ==
=== Current members ===
- Ralph Hubert – bass (1985–present)
- Martin LeMar – vocals (2008–present)
- Erik Adam H. Grösch – guitars (2008–present)
- Alex Landenburg – drums (2008–present)
- Peter Lake – guitars (2006–2008, 2018–present)

=== Former members ===
Vocals

- Peter "Peavy" Wagner (1985–1987)
- Wolfgang Borgmann (1987–1990)
- Doug Lee (1990–1994)
- Leo Szpigiel (2006–2008)

Guitars

- Jochen Schroeder (1985–1987)
- Frank Fricke (1987–1989)
- Reiner Kelch (1987–1988)
- Uwe Baltrusch (1989–1997)
- Georg Syrmbos (1991)
- Benedikt Zimniak (2008–2014)

Drums

- Uli Kusch (2006–2008)
- Jörg Michael (1985–1991)
- Peter Haas (1991–1997)

== Discography ==
=== Studio albums ===
- Mekong Delta (1987)
- The Music of Erich Zann (1988)
- The Principle of Doubt (1989)
- Dances of Death (and Other Walking Shadows) (1990)
- Kaleidoscope (1992)
- Visions Fugitives (1994)
- Pictures at an Exhibition (1996)
- Lurking Fear (2007)
- Wanderer on the Edge of Time (2010)
- Intersections (2012)
- In a Mirror Darkly (2014)
- Tales of a Future Past (2020)

=== EPs and singles ===
- The Gnome (1988)
- Toccata (1989)
- Dance on a Volcano (1993)

=== Live albums ===
- Live at an Exhibition (1991)
- Live in Frankfurt 1991 (DVD) (2007)

=== Compilations ===
- Classics (1993)
- The Principle of Doubt (Ambitions) (2005)
