= Mitochondrion (band) =

Canadian black-death metal band

- Origin: Victoria, British Columbia, Canada
- Genres: Death metal black metal
- Years active: 2003–present
- Label: Profound Lore
- Members: Shawn Haché; Nick Yanchuk; Karl Godard; Sebastian Montesi

Mitochondrion is a Canadian black-death metal band from Victoria, British Columbia, formed in 2003. The band has undergone some line-up changes, but since 2006 Mitochondrion was solidified as a power trio with Shawn Haché (guitar, vocals), Nick Yanchuk (guitar, vocals, bass) and Karl Godard (drums, keyboards). With this line-up Mitochondrion has recorded two full-length studio albums, the self-released Archaeaeon (2008) and Parasignosis (2011), which was released through Profound Lore Records. They later released an EP "Antinumerology" released by Dark Descent Records and Krucyator Productions and a split EP "In Cronian Hour" released by Dark Descent Records and Hellthrasher Productions.

According to music critics, "What makes Mitochondrion stand out is their ability to bring order to chaos. [...] It is a trait they share with Deathspell Omega, who craft a dizzying amount of sounds and influences into something palpably evil and eminently listenable. When most other bands try this, it sounds like they are toying with forces they do not understand." The musicianship on Parasignosis has been defined by Decibel magazine as a "dense, not-so-easily-digestible labyrinth of frightening mindfuckery," while Parasignosis itself was praised as a "mind-blowing, highly individual album."

In 2025, Graham Hartmann of Metal Injection included the album Archaeaon in his list of "10 Extremely Underrated Metal Albums From The 2000s".

== Members ==
Current

- Shawn Haché – vocals, guitars (2003–present)
- Nick Yanchuk – vocals, guitars, bass (2003–present)
- Sebastian Montesi – bass, vocals (2012–present)
- Karl Godard – drums, keyboards (2006–present)

Former

- Mitch Aramenko – guitars (2003–2007)
- Nick Gibas – bass, noise (2003–2009)
- Jesse Anderson – drums (2003–2006)

Touring

- Rob Hamilton – bass (2011–2012)

== Discography ==
Studio albums

- Archaeaon (2008)
- Parasignosis (2011)
- Vitriseptome (2024)

EPs

- Antinumerology (2013)

Demos

- Mitohondrion (2005)
- Through Cosmic Gaze (2006)

Splits

- Rituals of Transcendence / Liimk Halaayt (2010; w/ Gyibaaw)
- In Cronian Hour (2016; w/ Auroch)
