= Immortal Dominion =

American metal band

Immortal Dominion is an American extreme metal band from Fort Collins, Colorado, formed in 1992.

== History ==
They have played in Colorado, California, Wyoming, Utah, Indiana, Missouri and Kansas opening for national acts such as: Macabre, Fear Factory, Vader, Cephalic Carnage, Adema, Darkest Hour, Trust Company, Neurosis, Malevolent Creation, Dirty Rotten Imbeciles, Today is the Day, Living Sacrifice, and Napalm Death. The band members are: Brian Villers (guitars, backing vocals), Ray Smith (lead vocals), Brian "Edward" Schmidt (bass), Louis Micciullo (guitar) and Casey Glass (drums).

=== Teeth (film) ===
Immortal Dominion featured on the soundtrack of the breakout indie film Teeth. Another band had landed a song on the movie, but they broke up and were arguing about the rights to the songs. So Morris Beagle from Fist Music (distributor) sent the movie's Director, Mitchell Lichtenstein, music from several of his bands and they picked five songs from Immortal Dominion's album "Awakening".

The film won a juror's award for best actress at the Sundance Film Festival, and was purchased by Lionsgate/The Weinstein Company. It was released nationwide in February 2007 via Roadside Attractions, and has drawn considerable attention to Immortal Dominion on the strength of the song "Sold My Soul".

== Albums ==
=== Birth, EP – 1996 ===
Songs: Canyon Curse, Animated Adrenaline, Brighter Days, I Won't Kill You and Demon Voices.

=== Endure – 1998 ===
A hybrid of different metal genres, the album put Immortal Dominion on the map.

=== Awakening: The Revelation – 2006 ===
The second full-length release from Immortal Dominion after an opening EP.

=== Primortal – 2011 ===
For Primortal the band worked with producer Sterling Winfield (Pantera, Mercyful Fate). According to guitarist Brian Villers – "Sterling, our producer, kind of came in, and he took a listen to what we had, and he just felt like getting in and tearing things apart and rearranging stuff and slowing some stuff down." The album falls less into the death metal range and closer to hard rock.
