= Winterhorde =

Israeli black metal band

Winterhorde is an Israeli melodic black metal band.

== Select discography ==
- Nebula (2006)
- Underwatermoon (2010)
- Maestro (2016)
- Neptunian (2023)
