= Joachim Luetke =

German artist

Joachim Luetke (born 1957) is a German cross-media artist. He is mostly known for his artwork for bands such as Arch Enemy, Dimmu Borgir, Kreator, Marilyn Manson, Meshuggah, Sopor Aeternus and The Ensemble of Shadows and Rage. His art has also been published in book form and compared to that of H. R. Giger.

== Artistic training ==
Luetke studied graphic-design in Switzerland during the late seventies, and improved his artistic capabilities at the Academy of Fine Arts in Vienna, Austria. His teacher and mentor was Rudolf Hausner, the grandmaster of Phantastic Realism.

== Publications ==
- Luetke, Joachim (2000). Posthuman - The Art of Joachim Luetke. Wien: Weitbrecht Verlag. pp. 128 pages. ISBN 978-3-522-71935-3.
