= Amenti =

Amenti may refer to:

- Amenti (video game)
- Halls of Amenti, one-song EP by Cephalic Carnage

== See also ==
- Khenti-Amentiu, ancient Egyptian deity
- Amenta, surname
