= The Ossuary Lens =

Studio album by Allegaeon
- Released: April 4, 2025
- Studio: Flatline Audio in Fort Collins, CO
- Genre: Technical death metal; melodic death metal
- Length: 44:40
- Label: Metal Blade
- Producer: Dave Otero

Allegaeon chronology
Damnum (2022)	The Ossuary Lens (2025)

Singles from The Ossuary Lens
- 1. "Driftwood" Released: February 12, 2025; 2. "The Swarm" Released: March 13, 2025

Professional ratings
Review scores
Source	Rating
Blabbermouth.net	9/10

The Ossuary Lens is the seventh studio album by American death metal band Allegaeon, released on April 4, 2025. It is the band's first release to feature vocalist Ezra Haynes since 2014's Elements of the Infinite.

== Background and promotion ==
On February 12, 2025, the band released a new single, "Driftwood", and announced their seventh album, The Ossuary Lens. Another promotional single "The Swarm" and its accompanying music video was released on March 22, 2025, with guitarist Greg Burgess stating that its intro riff, written by guitarist Michael Stancel, "was actually written on tour in the UK on a boat in Bristol. I remember filming him playing it so we wouldn't forget how to play it."

The band will tour in promotion of the album, co-headlining a North American tour with Warbringer in March and April 2025, with bands Skeletal Remains and Summoning the Lich as opening acts.

== Track listing ==
All tracks are written by Allegaeon, with "Dark Matter Dynamics" co-written by Adrian Bellue.

No.	Title	Length
1.	"Refraction"	0:58
2.	"Chaos Theory"	4:30
3.	"Driftwood"	4:28
4.	"Dies Irae"	3:47
5.	"The Swarm"	3:27
6.	"Carried by Delusion"	4:48
7.	"Dark Matter Dynamics"	6:01
8.	"Imperial"	4:07
9.	"Wake Circling Above"	6:51
10.	"Scythe"	5:40
Total length:		44:40

== Personnel ==
Allegaeon

- Ezra Haynes – lead vocals
- Greg Burgess – guitars
- Michael Stancel – guitars, backing vocals
- Brandon Michael – bass, backing vocals
- Jeff Saltzman – drums

=== Credits ===
- Seth Siro Anton – artwork
- Stephanie Cabral – photography
- Dave Otero – mastering, production, engineering, mixing
- Adrian Bellue – acoustic guitar (track 7)
- Jesse Zuretti – orchestrations
