= The Breathing Process =

American deathcore band

- Origin: Connecticut/Pittsburgh, U.S.
- Genres: Deathcore, symphonic black metal, blackened death metal, melodic death metal, metalcore (early)
- Years active: 2003-2013, 2017-present
- Labels: Siege of Amida, Candlelight, Unique Leader
- Members: Jordan Milner; Sara Loerlein; Bryan James Bever; Alexander Verschoor; Christopher Rabideau; Dan Patton
- Past members: Chris Sansone; Ian Van Opijnen; Brian Varney; John LaFreniere; Alana Potocnik; Alan Cassidy; Jared Sloan; Tormentahl; Julian Parker; Cody Harmon; Jake Staley; Mark Bellofatto

The Breathing Process is an American deathcore band, formed in 2003 as one of the first bands of the genre to incorporate symphonic elements into their music, along with standard death metal and black metal. The band has released four albums and two EPs.

== History ==
Since forming, The Breathing Process released four EPs, three of which were demos, after which they were signed to Siege of Amida Records, known for their work with bands like Shadows Fall, Killswitch Engage, and All That Remains, releasing their debut album In Waking: Divinity via the label in October 2007. The album was noted for showing the band departing from their earlier metalcore sound by mixing the genre with blackened death metal, a style compared to fellow symphonic deathcore pioneers Winds of Plague. The band began to tour, but on April 22, 2008, their touring van and most of their belongings were destroyed in a massive fire. The band resumed touring in Canada in March 2009, with bands The World We Knew, The Analyst, and Whisteria Cottage.

The band's second full-length album Odyssey (un)Dead was released on March 8, 2010. The album received some positive reviews. The band has released a music video for "Vultures". The band toured in the U.S. in April and May 2010, and took part in Diskreet's American tour from August to October 2010, alongside Antagonist and Wretched. The band has also spoken their views against illegal downloading of music.

After several years of inactivity, the band toured in the U.S. in late July 2018 with Through the Eyes of the Dead. The Breathing Process released its third full-length album, Samsara on August 31, 2018. The band's fourth album Labyrinthian was released on October 8, 2021, their first album with Unique Leader Records, mixed and mastered by Dave Otero, known for his work with Cattle Decapitation and Rivers of Nihil. The album received some mildly positive reviews. The band has released singles and music videos for "Wilt", "Shroud", "Heir to None", and "Shadow Self". The band promoted the album with a U.S. tour in 2022 with Worm Shepherd.

Labyrinthian features guest vocals by David Simonich (Signs of the Swarm) in "Wilt" and Jamie Graham (Viscera, ex-Sylosis) in the title track. Speaking about the guest vocalists, founding guitarist Jordan Milner stated, "Dave was just the easiest collaboration as we sent him a message and he just turned up to the studio. We had a pre-production demo of the song we wanted him to guest on and it was very much bare bones with the tempo maps done so we could slot it in when the final recording was done. Chris and Dave were just sat there like whisper screaming ideas at each other which was quite funny without music. I’ve known Jamie Graham since like 2007 as he actually has us signed to Siege Of Amida. We’ve wanted to do a song with him forever because I love his voice and the projects he’s done. We literally sent him the song and got it back within a week. Personally it’s my favourite song on the album! It’s been great to continue that relationship into Unique Leader. Lightning really did strike twice. We just sent him a couple of demos and he signed us up!"

The band released a new EP titled Todeskrone on November 24, 2023. A music video was released for "Empty, Not Alone". Guitarist/keyboardist Alexander Verschoor has guest appeared in the songs "Misery" by Eternal Bloom and "Devil's Tongue" by Enthogen.

== Musical style ==
The Breathing Process started off as metalcore and screamo, but since then, the band and its material have been described as deathcore, blackened deathcore, death metal, black metal, symphonic black metal, blackened death metal, and melodic death metal. An AllMusic review has considered the band's second album Odyssey: (Un)Dead "a combination of melodic death metal and symphonic black metal with elements of doom metal, gothic metal, and progressive metal."

== Members ==
Current members

- Jordan Milner - guitars (2003–present)
- Sara Loerlein - guitars, additional clean vocals (2009–present)
- Bryan James Bever - drums (2017–present)
- Alexander Verschoor - guitars, keyboards (2019–present)
- Christopher Rabideau - vocals (2019–present)
- Dan Patton - bass (2019–present)

Past members

- Chris Sansone - drums, keyboards (2003–2008)
- Ian Van Opijnen - guitars (2003–2009, 2017–2019)
- Nick Burns - bass (2003-2004)
- Brian Varney - bass (2004–2009)
- John LaFreniere - vocals (2003–2013)
- Alana Potocnik - keyboards (2008–2009)
- Alan Cassidy - drums (2008–2009)
- Jared Sloan - keyboards (2009–2013)
- Tormentahl - drums (2009–2013)
- Julian Parker - bass (2009–2013)
- Cody Harmon - vocals (2017–2019)
- Jake Staley - bass (2017–2019)
- Mark Bellofatto - keyboards (2017–2019)

== Discography ==
=== Studio albums ===
- In Waking: Divinity (2007)
- Odyssey (Un)Dead (2010)
- Samsara (2018)
- Labyrinthian (2021)

=== EPs and demos ===
- Dialog Analysis for the Heartless (2003)
- Demo 2004 (2004)
- Demo 2005 (2005)
- I Am Legion (2006)
- Todeskrone (2023)
