= Odyssey (Un)Dead =

Studio album by the Breathing Process
- Released: March 8, 2010
- Recorded: 2008–2009
- Studios: Flatline Audio, Denver, Colorado, USA
- Genres: Deathcore; melodic death metal; symphonic black metal
- Length: 50:50
- Label: Candlelight
- Producer: Dave Otero

The Breathing Process chronology
| In Waking: Divinity (2007) | Odyssey (Un)Dead (2010) | Samsara (2018) |

Professional ratings
Review scores
| Source | Rating |
|---|---|
| AllMusic | 3/5 |
| Dead Rhetoric | 6/10 |
| Metalitalia.com | 7/10 |
| MetalSucks | 2/5 |
| Metalunderground.com | 4/5 |

Odyssey (Un)Dead is the second album by American melodic death metal/deathcore band the Breathing Process. The album was released on March 8, 2010. The band has released a music video for "Vultures". The band promoted the album with touring in the U.S. in April and May 2010, and took part in Diskreet's American tour from August to October 2010, alongside Antagonist and Wretched.

== Track listing ==
| No. | Title | Length |
|---|---|---|
| 1. | "Hours" | 1:42 |
| 2. | "Grimoire" | 4:29 |
| 3. | "Leveler" | 4:32 |
| 4. | "Vultures" | 4:05 |
| 5. | "Pantheon Unraveling" | 3:43 |
| 6. | "Starless:Eternal" | 1:10 |
| 7. | "Odyssey (un)Dead" | 4:19 |
| 8. | "Metamorphosis" | 4:21 |
| 9. | "Hordes" | 6:06 |
| 10. | "The Living Forest (Part I)" | 4:05 |
| 11. | "Wind Ritual" | 2:46 |
| 12. | "The Opaque Forest (Part II)" | 4:25 |
| 13. | "Decaying (Form)" | 5:07 |
| Total length: | | 50:50 |

== Personnel ==
- John LaFreniere – harsh vocals
- Jordan Milner – guitars, backing vocals
- Sara Loerlein – guitars, clean vocals
- Julian Parker – bass
- Jared Sloan – keyboards, orchestrations
- Tormentahl – drums
