= Fortuitous Oddity =

- Fortuitous Oddity demo tapes.

Demo album by Cephalic Carnage
- Released: 1996
- Genre: Deathgrind
- Length: 18:42

Cephalic Carnage chronology
Fortuitous Oddity (1996)	Conforming to Abnormality (1998)

Fortuitous Oddity is a 1996 self-released demo by deathgrind band Cephalic Carnage. In 1997, the band released it again with different artwork. The demo was noticed by a record company from Italy, who would go on to fund their first full album in 1998, Conforming to Abnormality.

== Track listing ==
1. "Analytical" – 4:36
2. "Chelsea" – 1:55
3. "Waiting for the Millennium" – 3:15
4. "Withered" – 2:00
5. "Hybrid" – 4:28
6. "Kill for Weed" – 2:28

== Re-recordings ==
"Analytical", "Waiting for the Millennium", and "Withered" (renamed "Wither") were re-recorded on Conforming to Abnormality (1998). "Hybrid" was re-recorded on Exploiting Dysfunction (2000). "Kill for Weed" was re-recorded on Anomalies (2005).
