= Apoptosis (album) =

Studio album by Allegaeon
- Released: April 19, 2019
- Studio: Flatline Audio in Fort Collins, CO
- Genre: Technical death metal; melodic death metal
- Length: 56:25
- Label: Metal Blade
- Producer: Dave Otero

Allegaeon chronology
Proponent for Sentience (2016)	Apoptosis (2019)	Damnum (2022)

Singles from Apoptosis
- 1. "Stellar Tidal Disruption" Released: January 31, 2019; 2. "Extremophiles (B)" Released: March 14, 2019; 3. "Colors of the Currents" Released: April 23, 2019

Professional ratings
Review scores
Source	Rating
Distorted Sound	10/10
Ghost Cult	9/10

Apoptosis is the fifth studio album by American death metal band Allegaeon. Produced by the band's longtime producer Dave Otero, the album was released on April 23, 2019 through Metal Blade Records. This is the first Allegaeon record to feature bassist Brandon Michael and the last to feature drummer Brandon Park.

Loudwire named it one of the 50 best metal albums of 2019.

== Musical style ==
Describing the album, vocalist Riley McShane stated "'Thematically, this record is all about contrast, and the music reflects that perfectly. The vocals are heavier than ever, but there are also more clean sections. The drums are faster than ever but also more dynamic, and the guitar playing is lower and slower than on most previous albums, but also provides long, melodic and beautiful sections throughout.'"

The song "Colors of the Currents" is an instrumental track featuring guitarist Greg Burgess playing classical guitar alongside Christina Sandsengen.

== Track listing ==
All tracks are written by Allegaeon, except where noted.

No.	Title	Writer(s)	Length
1.	"Parthenogenesis" (instrumental)		2:15
2.	"Interphase // Meiosis"		5:09
3.	"Extremophiles (B)"		5:54
4.	"The Secular Age"		4:37
5.	"Exothermic Chemical Combustion"		4:43
6.	"Extremophiles (A)"		4:03
7.	"Metaphobia"		4:14
8.	"Tsunami and Submergence"		6:26
9.	"Colors of the Currents" (instrumental; feat. Christina Sandsengen)	Greg Burgess, Christina Sandsengen	2:39
10.	"Stellar Tidal Disruption"		6:07
11.	"Apoptosis"		10:19
Total length:			56:25

Vinyl Edition Bonus Track
No.	Title	Writer(s)	Length
12.	"Concerto in Dm (BWV 1052)"	Johann Sebastian Bach	7:21
Total length:			63:41

== Charts ==
Chart (2019)	Peak position
Top Album Sales (Billboard)	66
Heatseekers Albums (Billboard)	2
Independent Albums (Billboard)	13

== Personnel ==
Allegaeon

- Riley McShane – lead vocals
- Greg Burgess – guitars, classical guitar
- Michael Stancel – guitars
- Brandon Michael – bass
- Brandon Park – drums
