= Misled by Certainty =

Studio album by Cephalic Carnage
- Released: August 31, 2010
- Recorded: Flatline Audio in Denver, Colorado
- Genre: Deathgrind, technical death metal
- Length: 53:43
- Label: Relapse
- Producer: Dave Otero

Cephalic Carnage chronology
Xenosapien (2007)	Misled by Certainty (2010)

Professional ratings
Review scores
Source	Rating
Allmusic	4/5 stars

Misled by Certainty is the sixth studio album by the Colorado-based deathgrind band Cephalic Carnage. It was released on August 31, 2010, through Relapse Records. Misled by Certainty sold 1,300 copies in the United States in its first week, appearing at the #24 position on Billboard Heatseekers. This is the first album with Brian Hopp as a guitarist. In support of this album, Cephalic Carnage toured Europe during September and October 2010; for this tour, called the "Initiation of the Misled European Tour 2010", Cephalic Carnage performed alongside Psycroptic, Ion Dissonance, Hour of Penance, and Dyscarnate. Four vlogs of the recording process for this album have been posted online.

A video was released for "The Incorrigible Flame" in early August 2010. A video for "Ohrwurm" was released in September 2010.

== Track listing ==
All tracks are written by Lenzig Leal, John Merryman and Steve Goldberg.

No.	Title	Length
1.	"The Incorrigible Flame"	4:30
2.	"Warbots A.M."	4:39
3.	"Abraxas of Filth"	3:44
4.	"Pure Horses"	0:38
5.	"Cordyceps Humanis"	5:05
6.	"Raped by an Orb"	4:15
7.	"P.G.A.D."	0:34
8.	"Dimensional Modulation Transmography"	5:05
9.	"Ohrwurm"	4:56
10.	"When I Arrive"	3:08
11.	"A King and a Thief"	2:45
12.	"Power and Force"	1:38
13.	"Repangaea"	12:11
14.	"Aeyeucgh!"	0:32
15.	"Grindcore Blastbeat Blues" (iTunes deluxe edition bonus track / Japanese bonus track)	2:28

== Personnel ==
- Lenzig Leal – vocals
- John Merryman – drums
- Steve Goldberg – guitar
- Nick Schendzielos – bass guitar, vocals
- Brian Hopp – guitar

=== Additional musicians ===
- Alex Camargo – vocals ("Power and Force")
- Blaine Cartwright – vocals ("P.G.A.D.")
- Ross Dolan – vocals ("Abraxas of Filth")
- Pat Hanson – keyboards ("Abraxas of Filth, "Repangaea", "Cordyceps Humanis")
- Zac Jefferson – vocals ("Raped by an Orb")
- Bruce Lamont – saxophone ("Ohrwurm", "Repangaea"), vocals ("Repangaea")
- Dave Otero – vocals ("Warbots A.M.")
- Katherine Rosser – vocals ("Repangaea")
- Travis Ryan – vocals ("When I Arrive")
- Keith Sanchez – vocals ("P.G.A.D.")
- Sherwood Webber – vocals ("Cordyceps Humanis")

=== Production ===
- Dave Otero – production
- Jeff Dunne – editing
- Orion Landau – album artwork
