= Proponent for Sentience =

Studio album by Allegaeon
- Released: September 23, 2016
- Recorded: January–February 2016
- Studio: Flatline Audio in Fort Collins, CO
- Genre: Melodic death metal; technical death metal
- Length: 72:05
- Label: Metal Blade
- Producer: Dave Otero

Allegaeon chronology
Elements of the Infinite (2014)	Proponent for Sentience (2016)	Apoptosis (2019)

Singles from Proponent for Sentience
- 1. "Gray Matter Mechanics" Released: July 14, 2016; 2. "Proponent for Sentience III - The Extermination" Released: August 10, 2016; 3. "Subdivisions" Released: August 23, 2016

Proponent for Sentience is the fourth studio album by American death metal band Allegaeon. It is the band's first release with vocalist Riley McShane and the first to feature clean vocals. The album was released on September 23, 2016, through Metal Blade Records. This is the band's last release with bassist Corey Archuleta, who announced he would be leaving the band at the end of 2016.

The album was produced by Dave Otero, who produced the band's debut album and previous release, Elements of the Infinite.

== Release ==
"Gray Matter Mechanics – Apassionata Ex Machinea" was the first song released from the album, being released on July 14, 2016. The song marked vocalist Riley McShane's debut with the band. On August 10 the band released the second song from the album, "Proponent for Sentience III – The Extermination", which features guest vocals from Björn "Speed" Strid of Soilwork and guest guitar from Benjamin Ellis of Scar Symmetry. On August 23, Allegaeon released a cover of "Subdivisions", originally by Canadian progressive rock band Rush. A week later on August 30, a music video was released for the song "All Hail Science". The video was shot at Black Sky Brewery in Denver, Colorado.

The album was made available for streaming on September 21 through MetalSucks. The album was released two days later on September 23 via Metal Blade Records.

== Reception ==
Professional ratings
Review scores
Source	Rating
Metal Hammer	3.5/5 stars
Metal Injection	9/10
New Noise Magazine	4/5 stars

Upon release, Proponent for Sentience received positive reviews from music critics.

Reviewing the album for Metal Hammer, Jason Hicks gave the album 3.5 stars out of 5. Hicks said the extended flamenco passage at the end of "Gray Matter Mechanics" could be potentially jarring and felt that the album's science concept was "samey", but praised the band's musicianship and McShane's vocals, especially on album opener "Proponent for Sentience I – The Conception". New Noise Magazine gave the album 4 out of 5 stars and criticized the album's 72 minute run-time and called some of the album's writing sub-par, but said the album is "Allegaeon's best and most complete work to date." The reviewer also praised the song "Proponent for Sentience III – The Extermination" for feeling "like a natural conclusion, with its Grade A melodies and hair-raising moments."

== Track listing ==
All tracks are written by Allegaeon, except where noted.

No.	Title	Writer(s)	Length
1.	"Proponent for Sentience I - The Conception"		6:23
2.	"All Hail Science"		3:24
3.	"From Nothing"		5:00
4.	"Gray Matter Mechanics - Apassionata Ex Machinea"		8:18
5.	"Of Mind and Matrix"		5:33
6.	"Proponent for Sentience II - The Algorithm"		8:19
7.	"Demons of an Intricate Design"		4:25
8.	"Terrathaw and the Quake"		6:10
9.	"Cognitive Computations"		5:58
10.	"The Arbiters"		6:11
11.	"Proponent for Sentience III - The Extermination" (featuring Björn "Speed" Strid and Benjamin Ellis)		6:59
12.	"Subdivisions" (Rush cover)	Geddy Lee, Alex Lifeson, Neil Peart	5:25
Total length:			72:05

== Personnel ==
Allegaeon

- Riley McShane – lead vocals
- Greg "Greggoroth" Burgess – guitars, classical guitar, acoustic guitar, orchestration
- Michael Stancel – guitars
- Corey Archuleta – bass, backing vocals
- Brandon Park – drums, percussion

Additional

- Björn "Speed" Strid – guest vocals on track 11
- Benjamin Ellis – guest guitar solo on track 11
- Dave Otero – production and mastering
- Joseph Ferris – orchestration, sequencing
- Sam Nelson – artwork
