= Xenosapien =

- Cover art by Orion Landau

Studio album by Cephalic Carnage
- Released: May 29, 2007
- Recorded: December 2006 – February 2007
- Genre: Deathgrind
- Length: 42:08
- Label: Relapse
- Producer: Dave Otero

Cephalic Carnage chronology
Anomalies (2005)	Xenosapien (2007)	Misled by Certainty (2010)

Alternative cover
- LP cover

Professional ratings
Review scores
Source	Rating
AllMusic	3.5/5 stars
Blabbermouth	9/10 stars
Exclaim!	favourable
Exclaim!	mixed
Metal Hammer	8/10 stars
PopMatters	8/10 stars
Stylus Magazine	B+

Xenosapien is the fifth studio album by Cephalic Carnage. It was released on May 29, 2007 on Relapse Records. "Endless Cycle of Violence" is the first single, and is available on the band's MySpace page. The album has received strong reviews, and peaked at #13 on the Billboard Heatseekers chart. Xenosapien was recorded from December 2006 to February 2007.

The album was released on CD and 12" vinyl format. The vinyl edition was limited to 1000 copies.

== Track listing ==
No.	Title	Length
1.	"Endless Cycle of Violence"	4:15
2.	"Divination & Volition"	4:20
3.	"Molting"	2:51
4.	"Touched by an Angel"	2:55
5.	"Vaporized"	1:45
6.	"Heptarchy (In the UK)"	3:22
7.	"G.lobal O.verhaul D.evice"	5:50
8.	"Let Them Hate so Long as They Fear"	1:10
9.	"The Omega Point"	2:22
10.	"Megacosm of the Aquaphobics"	4:03
11.	"Ov Vicissitude" (ends at 4:15 followed by 5 minutes of silence)	9:15
Total length:		42:08

Hidden track
No.	Title	Length
12.	"Graul"	6:45

== Personnel ==
=== Cephalic Carnage ===
- Lenzig Leal – vocals
- Zac Joe – guitar
- John Merryman – drums
- Steve Goldberg – guitar
- Nick Schendzielos – bass, vocals

=== Additional musicians ===
- Bruce Lamont (Yakuza) – vocals, saxophone ("G.lobal O.verhaul D.evice")

=== Production ===
- Dave Otero – production
- Orion Landau – cover art
