= Formshifter =

Studio album by Allegaeon
- Released: May 8, 2012
- Recorded: December 2011 – January 2012
- Studio: Lambesis Studios, San Diego, California
- Genre: Melodic death metal, technical death metal
- Length: 52:51
- Label: Metal Blade
- Producer: Daniel Castleman

Allegaeon chronology
| Fragments of Form and Function (2010) | Formshifter (2012) | Elements of the Infinite (2014) |

Singles from Formshifter
- 1. "Tartessos: The Hidden Xenocryst" Released: February 21, 2012; 2. "Iconic Images" Released: April 16, 2012; 3. "Twelve - Vals for the Legions" Released: May 1, 2012; 4. "Behold (God I Am)" Released: May 7, 2012; 5. "A Path Disclosed" Released: August 30, 2012

Formshifter is the second studio album by American death metal band Allegaeon. The album was released on May 8, 2012 through Metal Blade Records. As the band did not employ a drummer during the album's production, all drum parts were handled by session musician J. P. Andrande. The album was also the last effort to feature founding member and guitarist Ryan Glisan, as well as the only to feature drummer JP Andrade. The album charted at no. 29 on the Top Heatseekers chart. It is the only Allegaeon album that was not produced by Dave Otero.

== Release ==
In October 2011, the band shared that they were entering Lambesis Studios (owned by As I Lay Dying's Tim Lambesis) with producer Daniel Castleman (As I lay Dying, Carnifex, Molotov Solution) to record a follow-up to Fragments of Form and Function. The band announced that drummer JP Andrade had joined the band to record the upcoming LP. In January 2012, Allegaeon entered the studio to begin work on the upcoming LP, Formshifter. The band described the album's sound as a mixture of their prior releases with new elements included.

Speaking on the album's sound, guitarist Ryan Glisan stated, "This album to me indicates the future of the band but nods to our past as well. It, to me, is more of where I have envisioned our band being since I started the band a couple years back, it relies on similar songwriting structures and musicality but adds more groove and memorable riffing than our previous efforts."

Lyrically, themes of the album focused on space, civilization and philosophy. The first song to be released from the album was "Tartessos: The Hidden Xenocryst." The song's official video was uploaded to Metal Blade's YouTube channel on February 21, 2012. Vocalist Ezra Haynes elaborated on the band's first single, sharing that the song "is definitely one that sticks out to me. I was raised on Edgar Cayce readings and tales of Atlantis. When Greg [Burgess] and I knew we wanted to touch base on an ancient civilization, Atlantis was the logical choice." The band would upload a playthrough video for the song in June 2012.

A second song from the album, "Iconic Images," was released exclusively via Lambgoat on April 16, 2012. The album's third single, "Twelve - Vals for the Legions" debuted exclusively through MetalSucks on May 1, 2012. A fourth song, "Behold (God I Am)," premiered with an accompanying lyric video on May 7. The album was released the next day, on May 8. A music video was released on August 30 for the song "A Path Disclosed."

In a 10th anniversary interview with MetalInjection, Greg Burgess explained the album's title was a continuation of Fragments of Form and Function, stating "we took the Form from that title and just altered it to feel like it was a continuation of the band." Burgess felt the recording process of the album helped turn the band into what it was today, including the usage of eight string guitars.

== Track listing ==
All tracks are written by Allegaeon.

| No. | Title | Length |
|---|---|---|
| 1. | "Behold (God I Am)" | 7:18 |
| 2. | "Tartessos: The Hidden Xenocryst" | 4:23 |
| 3. | "A Path Disclosed" | 4:29 |
| 4. | "Iconic Images" | 4:24 |
| 5. | "Twelve-vals for the Legions" | 7:11 |
| 6. | "The Azrael Trigger" | 5:00 |
| 7. | "From the Stars Death Came" | 5:25 |
| 8. | "Timeline Dissonance" | 3:21 |
| 9. | "Formshifter" | 5:18 |
| 10. | "Secrets of the Sequence" | 6:02 |
| Total length: | | 52:51 |

== Reception ==
Professional ratings
Review scores
| Source | Rating |
|---|---|
| About.com | 4/5 stars |
| AllMusic | 3.5/5 stars |
| Chronicles of Chaos | 7/10 |
| Angry Metal Guy | 3.5/5 stars |
| Kerrang! | 4/5 stars |

Commercially, the album was the band's first to chart, peaking at #29 on the Billboard New Artist Chart, #88 Billboard Top Independent Albums, and #99 Billboard Top Hard Music Albums.

Upon its release, Formshifter has received generally positive reviews. About.com reviewer Andrew Kapper gave the album 4 out of 5 stars, saying "there is never a flat moment on the LP" and commending Ezra Haynes's vocals along with the guitar work. AllMusic reviewer Gregory Heaney gave the album 3.5 out of 5 stars, comparing the album to At the Gates and Arch Enemy and calling the album a "nonstop riff-fest". Chronicles of Chaos gave the album a 7 out of 10 and said the album's tracks increase in terms of quality, making the first three tracks "seem like a year old inconvenience".

== Personnel ==
- Ezra Haynes – lead vocals
- Greg Burgess – guitars, classical guitar
- Ryan Glisan – guitars
- Corey Archuleta – bass, backing vocals
- J.P. Andrande – drums

Additional personnel

- Daniel Castleman – Engineer, mastering, mixing
- Elmo Arteaga – Assistant engineer
- Collin Marks – Artwork
- Donovan Roubsouay – photography
- Brian J. Ames – layout

== Charts ==
| Chart (2012) | Peak position |
|---|---|
| US Heatseekers | 29 |
