= Labyrinthian =

Studio album by the Breathing Process
- Released: October 8, 2021
- Studio: Flatline Audio, Denver, Colorado, USA
- Genre: Symphonic black metal; blackened death metal; deathcore
- Length: 53:38
- Label: Unique Leader

The Breathing Process chronology
Samsara (2018)	Labyrinthian (2021)	Todeskrone (EP) (2023)

Singles from Labyrinthian
- 1. "Wilt" Released: June 1, 2021; 2. "Shroud" Released: July 16, 2021; 3. "Heir to None" Released: August 17, 2021; 4. "Shadow Self" Released: September 15, 2021

Professional ratings
Review scores
Source	Rating
Distorted Sound	7/10
Metalitalia.com	6.5/10

Labyrinthian is the fourth album by American blackened death metal/deathcore band the Breathing Process. The album was released on October 8, 2021, their first album with Unique Leader Records, mixed and mastered by Dave Otero, known for his work with Cattle Decapitation and Rivers of Nihil. The band promoted the album with a U.S. tour in 2022 with Worm Shepherd.

Labyrinthian features guest vocals by David Simonich (Signs of the Swarm) in "Wilt" and Jamie Graham (Viscera, ex-Sylosis) in the title track. Speaking about the guest vocalists, founding guitarist Jordan Milner stated, "Dave was just the easiest collaboration as we sent him a message and he just turned up to the studio. We had a pre-production demo of the song we wanted him to guest on and it was very much bare bones with the tempo maps done so we could slot it in when the final recording was done. Chris and Dave were just sat there like whisper screaming ideas at each other which was quite funny without music. I’ve known Jamie Graham since like 2007 as he actually has us signed to Siege Of Amida. We’ve wanted to do a song with him forever because I love his voice and the projects he’s done. We literally sent him the song and got it back within a week. Personally it’s my favourite song on the album! It’s been great to continue that relationship into Unique Leader. Lightning really did strike twice. We just sent him a couple of demos and he signed us up!"

== Track listing ==
No.	Title	Length
1.	"Terminal"	5:33
2.	"Shadow Self"	4:23
3.	"Wilt" (featuring David Simonich)	4:22
4.	"A Savage Plea"	5:09
5.	"Labyrinthian" (featuring Jamie Graham)	5:24
6.	"I Sleep, I Wake"	7:04
7.	"Heir to None"	4:55
8.	"Shroud"	5:01
9.	"Atlas"	4:53
10.	"We, the Drowned"	6:54
Total length:		53:38

== Personnel ==
- Chris Rabideau – lead vocals
- Jordan Milner – guitars, backing vocals
- Sara Loerlein – guitars, backing vocals
- Alexander Bryce – guitars, keyboards, orchestrations, backing vocals
- Dan Patton – bass
- Bryan Bever – drums
