= Damnum =

Studio album by Allegaeon
- Released: February 25, 2022
- Studio: Flatline Audio in Fort Collins, CO
- Genres: Technical death metal; melodic death metal
- Length: 60:08
- Label: Metal Blade
- Producer: Dave Otero

Allegaeon chronology
Apoptosis (2019)	Damnum (2022)	The Ossuary Lens (2025)

Singles from Damnum
- 1. "Into Embers" Released: October 27, 2021; 2. "Of Beasts and Worms" Released: January 20, 2022

Professional ratings
Review scores
Source	Rating
Distorted Sound	7/10
Blabbermouth.net	8.5/10
Metal Injection	8.5/10

Damnum is the sixth studio album by American death metal band Allegaeon. It is the bands first release to feature Jeff Saltzman on drums, and the last to feature vocalist Riley McShane. The record charted at No. 100 on the Billboard Top Album Sales charts. Loudwire named the album among the top 50 best rock and metal albums of 2022.

== Background ==
On April 14, 2021, Allegaeon announced that former Aversed drummer Jeff Saltzman would be joining the band to replace Brandon Park, who had departed in 2020. Guitarist Greg Burgess noted the upcoming album would be the first record on which the drummer had written all their parts, where in the past the guitarists had programmed a beat and had their drummer write-out the fills.

On October 27, 2021, Metal Blade Records announced Allegaeon's forthcoming sixth studio album Damnum would be released on February 25, 2022.

A promotional single "Into Embers" and an accompanying music video was released the same day, with vocalist Riley McShane describing the track as a song that "embodies the dark and fitful nature of this album by bringing to the table elements of ourselves as a band and as individual musicians that we have been waiting to share with you all for a long, long time."

The band also announced that the record would be produced by Dave Otero at Colorado's Flatline Audio Studio.

On January 20, 2022, the band released a music video for the song "Of Beasts and Worms."

Damnum would ultimately prove to the be last album featuring vocalist of seven years Riley McShane, who announced his departure from the band in August 2022.

The album's artwork was provided by Travis Smith.

== Musical styles and themes ==
Lyrically, Damnum is substantially darker than Allegaeon's earlier works, and focuses on personal topics and loss, abandoning the scientific focus of earlier releases. One reviewer noted the title is Latin word meaning "a loss or hurt, harm, or damage." and that those themes are persistent throughout the record. Vocalist Riley McShane noted that there "was a lot of anger and sadness present when writing the album. Not with each other, but just as a by-product of the shape of things in the world around us, as well as some hard-hitting losses in our individual lives."

The album employs substantially more clean vocals than prior releases, perhaps making the album more "accessible" than prior efforts. Many reviewers also noted the influence of other bands on this record's sound, specifically Opeth, Archspire, and Katatonia.

== Reception ==
The album was well received by critics, with Loudwire naming it one of the 50 best rock and metal albums of the year. Metal Injection reviewer Max Morin stated the album might be the band's best yet, and praised Saltzman's drums and Otero's production, noting the band's evolution "from mechanical tech-deathheads to progressive wayfarers." Blabbermouth.net also reviewed the album positively, stating "ALLEGAEON have always been a bit special, and this is their most fantastic and fearless voyage to date."

Commercially, the album sold 1,675 units in its first week, debuting at No. 52 on the Billboard Top 200 Album Sales chart.

== Track listing ==
All tracks are written by Allegaeon, except where noted.

No.	Title	Length
1.	"Bastards of the Earth"	4:32
2.	"Of Beasts and Worms"	6:30
3.	"Into Embers"	5:19
4.	"To Carry My Grief Through Torpor and Silence"	5:19
5.	"Vermin"	5:10
6.	"Called Home"	7:40
7.	"Blight"	5:01
8.	"The Dopamine Void, Pt. 1"	2:06
9.	"The Dopamine Void, Pt. II"	5:01
10.	"Saturnine"	4:41
11.	"In Mourning"	1:51
12.	"Only Loss"	6:53
Total length:		1:00:08

== Charts ==
Peak positions
Chart	Position	Source
US Billboard 200	100	
US Top New Artist Albums (Billboard)	5	
US Current Hard Music Albums (Billboard)	6	
US Independent Current Albums (Billboard)	20	
US Current Rock Albums (Billboard)	23	
US Digital Albums (Billboard)	24	
US Heatseakers Albums (Billboard)	36	
US Internet Albums (Billboard)	4	
US Current 200 Album Sales (Billboard)	52	
US Top Album Sales (Billboard)	94	
Canada Hard Music Albums (Billboard)	9	
Canada Current Digital Albums (Billboard)	17	
Canada Digital Albums (Billboard)	19	
Canada Top Albums (Billboard)	55	
Canada Top Current Albums (Billboard)	41	

== Personnel ==
Allegaeon

- Riley McShane – lead vocals
- Greg Burgess – guitars, classical guitar
- Michael Stancel – guitars
- Brandon Michael – bass
- Jeff Saltzman – drums

=== Credits ===
- Travis Smith – Artwork, Layout
- Dave Otero – Mastering, Production, Engineering, Mixing
- Tommy Bonnevialle – Piano (tracks: 7, 8)
- Joe Ferris – Synth, Samples, Orchestra
