= Halls of Amenti =

EP by Cephalic Carnage
- Released: October 29, 2002
- Genre: Doom metal
- Length: 19:00
- Label: Willowtip
- Producer: Cephalic Carnage, Dave Otero

Cephalic Carnage chronology
Lucid Interval (2002)	Halls of Amenti (2002)	Anomalies (2005)

Professional ratings
Review scores
Source	Rating
Allmusic	4/5 stars
Stylus Magazine	B+

Halls of Amenti is a one-song EP by Cephalic Carnage released by Willowtip Records. The song is 19 minutes in length. It is an experimental song done in a doom metal style, using some death metal vocals.

Halls of Amenti was intended to be the first in a series of three. The second release, titled Antarctica: Journey to Amenti, has not been released. The story revolves around a planet being turned into a block of ice, with its inhabitants eventually becoming allergic to the sun's rays, having to live underground to retain warmth. When the planet eventually begins thawing, the inhabitants are finally forced to face the deadly light.

It was played live for the first time at the 2008 Roadburn Festival.

== Track listing ==
All music is composed by Cephalic Carnage.

No.	Title	Length
1.	"Halls of Amenti"	19:00

== Personnel ==
- Lenzig Leal – vocals
- Zac Joe – guitar
- Steve Goldberg – guitar
- Jawsh Mullen – bass
- John Merryman – drums

=== Production ===
- Cephalic Carnage – production
- Dave Otero – production, recording, engineering, mixing

== See also ==
- Amenti
