= Buried in Violence =

Studio album by Product of Hate
- Released: February 5, 2016
- Recorded: 2015
- Studio: Belle City Sound, Racine, Wisconsin
- Genre: Thrash metal, groove metal
- Length: 43:30
- Label: Napalm Records
- Producer: James Murphy

Buried in Violence is the first studio album by American thrash metal/groove metal band Product of Hate, released through Napalm Records on February 5, 2016.

== Track listing ==
All tracks are written by Product of Hate, except "Perry Mason" (written by Ozzy Osbourne, Zakk Wylde and John Purdell)

No.	Title	Length
1.	"Kill. You. Now."	4:04
2.	"Annihilation"	3:28
3.	"...As Your Kingdom Falls"	4:10
4.	"Blood Coated Concrete"	3:57
5.	"Monster"	3:27
6.	"Buried in Violence"	3:31
7.	"Vindicare"	2:41
8.	"Nemesis"	4:51
9.	"Revolution of Destruction"	3:34
10.	"Unholy Manipulator"	4:15
11.	"Perry Mason" (Ozzy Osbourne cover)	5:32
Total length:		43:30

== Charts ==
Buried in Violence debuted at number 9 on the Billboard Heatseekers East North Central Chart.
