= Product of Hate =

American metal band

- Origin: Kenosha, Wisconsin, U.S.
- Genres: Thrash metal, groove metal
- Years active: 2007–present
- Labels: Napalm; POH Metalworks
- Members: Adam Gilley, Mike McGuire, Mark Campbell, Geno Rathbone, Cody Rathbone
- Website: productofhate.com

Product of Hate is an American thrash metal/groove metal band from Kenosha, Wisconsin. The band is currently signed to Napalm Records, and they have released two studio albums to date.

== History ==
The band was formally found under the name I for an I in 2007, however the band decided to change their name due to a Canadian band with the same name. To avoid potential legal issues, they decided on Product of Hate.

On February 5, 2016, Product of Hate released their debut album, Buried in Violence, under Napalm Records. The album was recorded by both Scott Creekmore at Mercenary Digital Studios in Zion, Illinois and Chris Djuricic, sometimes known as Chris Wisco, at Belle City Sound in Racine, Wisconsin and mixed and mastered by James Murphy, former guitarist of Death, Testament, and Obituary. The album debuted at number 9 on the Billboard Heatseekers East North Central Chart.

The band's second album, You Brought This War, was released on February 5, 2021.

== Concert tours ==
Prior to signing with Napalm Records, Product of Hate played numerous one-off dates with bands such as Hatebreed, Chimaira and Lamb of God. After signing to Napalm, the band embarked on their first North American Tour (The "GetRekt" Tour) with Allegaeon and The Agonist in 2015. Product of Hate's first tour following the release of "Buried in Violence" was a late spring run with Mushroomhead, Sumo Cyco and Madame Mayhem from April–June 2016. From September–October 2016, the band teamed with their Napalm Records labelmates, Hammer Fight for a tour of the Eastern United States dubbed the Hammer Out the Hate Tour.

In 2017, Product of Hate toured the U.S. with Skinlab and IKILLYA.

== Band members ==
- Adam Gilley – vocals
- Mike McGuire – drums
- Mark Campbell – bass guitar
- Gene Rathbone – lead guitar
- Cody Rathbone – rhythm guitar

== Discography ==
=== Studio albums ===
- Buried in Violence (2016)
- You Brought This War (2021)

=== EPs ===
- The Unholy Manipulator (2010)

=== Singles ===
- "Revolution of Destruction" (2012)
- "A Well-Deserved Death" (2012)
- "...As Your Kingdom Falls" (2015)
- "Monster" (2016)
- "Rapture" (2018)
- "Shout at the Devil" (Mötley Crüe cover) (2019)
- "Euphoria" (2020)
- "Cult of Personality" (Living Colour cover) (2020)

=== Music videos ===
Year	Song	Director
2015	"...As Your Kingdom Falls" (lyric video)	James Zahn
2015	"Unholy Manipulator"	James Zahn
2015	"Blood Coated Concrete"	James Zahn
2016	"Monster"	James Zahn (The Rock Father)
2016	"Kill. You. Now."	James Zahn (The Rock Father)
2016	"...As Your Kingdom Falls (Tour Edition)"	Josh Apple
2017	"Revolution of Destruction"	James Zahn (The Rock Father)
2019	"Cult of Personality"	James Zahn (The Rock Father)
2020	"You Brought This War"	James Zahn (The Rock Father)
