= Conforming to Abnormality =

Studio album by Cephalic Carnage
- Released: February 9, 1998
- Genre: Deathgrind
- Length: 47:43
- Labels: Headfucker, Relapse

Cephalic Carnage chronology
Fortuitous Oddity (1996)	Conforming to Abnormality (1998)	Impaled / Cephalic Carnage (1999)

Alternative cover
- 2008 Relapse Records reissue cover

Professional ratings
Review scores
Source	Rating
Exclaim!	favourable

Conforming to Abnormality is Cephalic Carnage's first full-length album. It was first released in 1998 on Italy's Headfucker Records. In 2002, the album was re-released on Hybrid Records. In 2006, Subordinate Records from Italy re-released the album without the band's permission on CD and LP. In 2008, the album was remixed, remastered, and repackaged, and had 20 bonus tracks added. This version was released by Relapse Records on April 29, 2008. The bonus tracks come from the band's split with Anal Blast, plus a new song sung by former bassist Jawsh Mullen.

== Track listing ==
All tracks are written by Cephalic Carnage.

No.	Title	Length
1.	"Anechoic Chamber"	1:34
2.	"Jihad"	4:13
3.	"Analytical"	4:28
4.	"Wither"	1:52
5.	"Regalos de Mota"	5:13
6.	"Extreme of Paranoia"	4:50
7.	"A.Z.T."	0:48
8.	"Waiting for the Millennium"	3:21
9.	"Live at Your Mom's House"	0:31
10.	"Exhumed Remains"	1:45
11.	"Britches"	0:22
12.	"The Struggle"	2:30
13.	"Trailor Park Meth Queen"	1:02
14.	"Phantom Pharter"	1:20
15.	"Strung out on Viagra"	1:15
16.	"Perversions and the Guilt After"	3:51
17.	"Stepped in Cow Shit Blues"	0:33
18.	"Father Pederast"	0:09
19.	"Once More with out Feeling"	0:04
20.	Untitled	0:05
21.	Untitled	0:11
22.	"Shut Up"	0:04
23.	"Novacaine (Re-Installing Teeth)"	0:15
24.	"Shrump Po' Boy"	0:50
25.	"Celebrate"	0:08
26.	"Occular Penile Receptacle"	2:20
27.	"Dave's Lunch"	1:51
28.	Untitled	2:18

Tracks 9–28 are bonus tracks available on the 2008 re-release.

== Personnel ==
- Lenzig Leal – vocals
- Zac Joe – guitar, bass (1–8)
- John Merryman – drums
- Steve Goldberg – guitar, bass (1–8)
- Jawsh Mullen – bass (9–28)
- Brian Goldberg – vocals (16)
