= Samsara (The Breathing Process album) =

Studio album by the Breathing Process
- Released: August 31, 2018
- Studio: Flatline Audio, Denver, Colorado, USA
- Genre: Symphonic black metal; melodic death metal; deathcore
- Length: 45:17

The Breathing Process chronology
Odyssey (Un)Dead (2010)	Samsara (2018)	Labyrinthian (2021)

Professional ratings
Review scores
Source	Rating
Metal Purgatory Media	8.5/10
Metal Trenches	9.7/10

Samsara is the third album by American blackened death metal/deathcore band the Breathing Process. The album was released on August 31, 2018. It is their first album in 8 years, since Odyssey (Un)Dead (2010). The song "Supervoid" was released in advance on August 20, 2018.

== Track listing ==
No.	Title	Length
1.	"Et Hoc Est Infernum"	1:35
2.	"The Traveler"	5:24
3.	"Into the Night"	4:54
4.	"Supervoid"	4:29
5.	"The Conscious Observer"	5:19
6.	"Servile"	4:26
7.	"Dethroned"	4:38
8.	"The Nothing"	5:18
9.	"Sungrazer"	3:43
10.	"Absolute Truth"	5:31
Total length:		45:17

== Personnel ==
- Cody Harmon – lead vocals
- Jordan Milner – guitars, backing vocals
- Sara Loerlein – guitars, backing vocals
- Ian van Opijnen – guitars
- Mark Bellofatto – keyboards, orchestrations
- Jake Staley – bass
- Bryan Bever – drums
