= Lucid Interval =

Studio album by Cephalic Carnage
- Released: August 20, 2002
- Genre: Deathgrind
- Length: 60:13
- Label: Relapse
- Producer: Cephalic Carnage, Dave Otero

Cephalic Carnage chronology
Exploiting Dysfunction (2000)	Lucid Interval (2002)	Halls of Amenti (2002)

Alternative cover
- LP and 2011 reissue cover

Professional ratings
Review scores
Source	Rating
Allmusic	3/5 stars
Pitchfork Media	8.1/10
Stylus Magazine	B+

Lucid Interval is the third full-length album released by Cephalic Carnage. It was released in 2002 via Relapse Records. The album was reissued by Relapse Records with a bonus track on September 13, 2011.

== Track listing ==
No.	Title	Length
1.	"Scolopendra Cingulata"	1:35
2.	"Fortuitous Oddity"	0:44
3.	"Anthro Emesis"	6:21
4.	"The Isle of California"	1:21
5.	"Pseudo"	5:56
6.	"Friend of Mine"	0:08
7.	"Rebellion"	3:56
8.	"Zuno Gyakusatsu"	0:53
9.	"Black Metal Sabbath"	6:15
10.	"Cannabism"	0:45
11.	"Lucid Interval"	4:11
12.	"Misguided"	0:56
13.	"Puff de la Morte"	2:36
14.	"Redundant"	2:44
15.	"Arsonist Savior" (song ends at 5:20; hidden track begins at 12:28)	21:16
16.	Untitled	0:36

== Personnel ==
=== Cephalic Carnage ===
- Lenzig Leal – vocals
- Zac Joe – guitar
- John Merryman – drums
- Steve Goldberg – guitar
- Jawsh Mullen – bass

=== Additional musicians ===
- Matt Blanks (Happy Pappy) – electronics, ambient noise
- Angela Vigil – vocals ("Anthro-Emesis")
- Donovan Breazeale (Autopsy Commission) – vocals ("Anthro-Emesis")
- Diego Sanchez (Disgorge) – vocals ("Anthro-Emesis")
- A.J. Magana (Disgorge) – vocals ("Anthro-Emesis")
- Keith Sanchez (Catheter) – vocals ("The Isle of California")
- Keith Coombes (Deadspeak) – vocals ("Pseudo")
- Dirk (Evulsion) – vocals ("Pseudo")
- Terry Christbutcher (Excommunion) – vocals ("Zuno Gyakusatsu")
- The Choir of the Damned (Dave Otero (Serberus), Dirk Trujillo (Evulsion), Ron (Mandrake), Keith Sanchez, Tina Sanchez, Than Wilson (Deadspeak), Keith Coombes (Deadspeak)) – backing vocals ("Black Metal Sabbath")
- Ron (Mandrake) – vocals ("Cannabism")
- Tony Perez – acoustic guitar ("Cannabism")
- Joe Tapia (Laughing Dog, Noisear) – vocals ("Misguided")
- Alex Marquez (Laughing Dog, Noisear) – vocals ("Misguided")
- Dylan Yost – violin ("Arsonist Savior")
- Jae Foetusgrubber – backing vocals ("Arsonist Savior")

=== Production ===
- Dave Otero – recording, production, mixing, mastering (Hellion II Studios)
- Cephalic Carnage – production
- Steve Sundberg – additional mastering
- Matthew F. Jacobson – executive production
