= Amenta =

Amenta is a surname. Notable people with the surname include:

- Alessia Amenta, Italian Egyptologist, archeologist, and curator
- Edwin Amenta, American sociologist
- Joseph Amenta, Canadian film director and screenwriter
- Marco Amenta (born 1970), Italian director, producer, and photojournalist
- Mauro Amenta (born 1953), Italian footballer
- Nina Amenta, American computer scientist
- Paul S. Amenta (1922–2014), American politician
- Pino Amenta, Australian film and television director

== See also ==
- Amenta Matthew (born 1952), Marshallese politician
