= Cephalic Carnage =

American deathgrind band

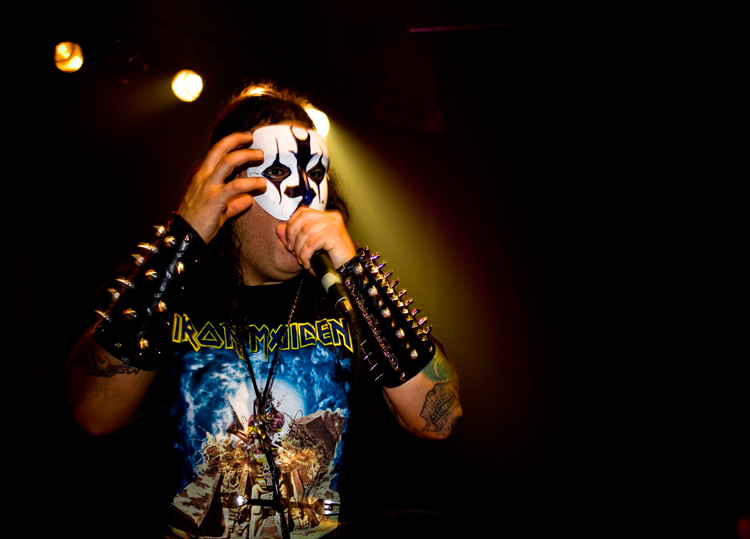
- Frontman Leonard Leal in 2009

Background information
- Origin: Denver, Colorado, U.S.
- Genres: Deathgrind, technical death metal
- Years active: 1992–2010, 2015, 2022–present
- Labels: Relapse, Headfucker
- Members: Leonard Leal; John Merryman; Steve Goldberg; Nick Schendzielos; Brian Hopp
- Past members: Zac Joe; Anthony Chavez; Tom Clenin; Doug Williams; Howard Hubbard; Jawsh Mullen

Cephalic Carnage is an American death metal band formed in Denver, Colorado in 1992. The band consists vocalist Leonard Leal, guitarists Steve Goldberg and Brian Hopp, drummer John Merryman and bassist Nick Schendzielos. Cephalic Carnage has released six studio albums and toured in North America, Europe and Japan.

Cephalic Carnage play a technically proficient deathgrind style. They experiment with other genres and incorporate humorous songs into their albums, such as parodies of black metal or metalcore. They refer to themselves as "rocky mountain hydro grind".

== History ==
=== Conforming to Abnormality and Exploiting Dysfunction (1992–2001) ===
Vocalist Leonard Leal, drummer Anthony Chavez, bassist Tom Clenin, and guitarist Zac Joe formed Cephalic Carnage in Denver, Colorado, in 1992. The quartet recorded the demo EP Scrape My Lungs in 1993, then took a break until 1996, when they recruited drummer John Merryman, guitarist Steve Goldberg, and bassist Doug Williams. Merryman collaborated with Secret Chiefs 3. Soon after reforming, their second demo EP, Fortuitous Oddity, was released. During 1997, Cephalic Carnage financed its tour across the United States.

In 1998, the band caught the attention of Italian label Headfucker Records, which released the band's debut album, Conforming to Abnormality, that year. Williams left in 1999 and joined Origin. Jawsh Mullen replaced him. The band toured at the Milwaukee Metalfest in 1998, the Dallas Grindfest, the Ohio Deathfest and the Denver Hatefest in 1999.

In 2000, Cephalic Carnage signed to heavy metal label Relapse Records and released its second album, Exploiting Dysfunction, which included a tour with Napalm Death and The Dillinger Escape Plan.

=== Lucid Interval and Anomalies (2002–2006) ===
Lucid Interval, the band's third album, was recorded in early 2002 and released in August that year. The band toured a month later in Canada and in the U.S. with German thrash metal veterans Kreator and Destruction. In May 2003, the band undertook the "North American Contamination" tour with Mastodon and others. That September, Cephalic Carnage and Madball supported Hatebreed on the North American "Rise of Brutality" tour.

In September 2004, the band recorded its next album, Anomalies, with producer Dave Otero. Darren Doane directed a promotional music video for "Dying Will Be the Death of Me", which premiered at MTV's Headbangers Ball. The song parodies American metalcore with its music, lyrics, and vocals. In March 2005, Anomalies was released, and the band toured North America.

Mullen exited in January 2006 to prioritize his education and other acts, and the band replaced him with Nick Schendzielos. In March, the band's recording studio was robbed. They played several shows in the United States in April, and an extensive European tour followed in June with Darkest Hour.

=== Xenosapien and Misled by Certainty (2007–2010) ===
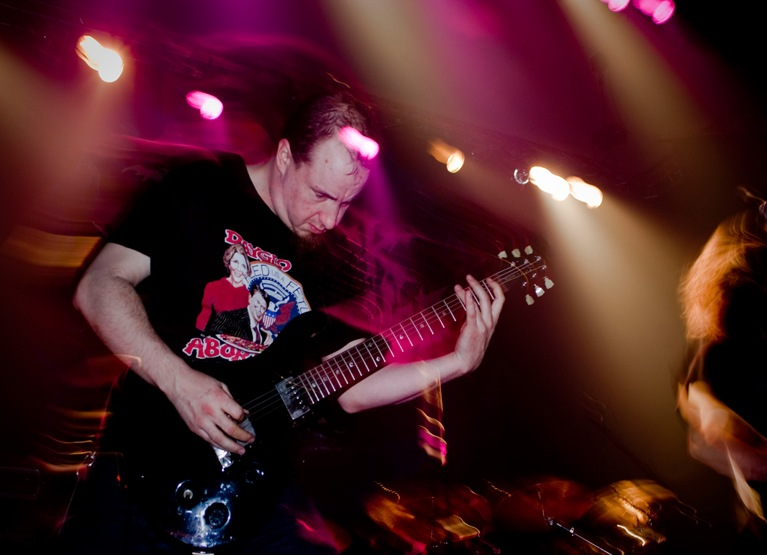
Guitarist Steve Goldberg in 2009

The band recorded its next studio album between November and December 2006, and its release was set for May 2007 under the title Xenosapien. In March 2007, the band supported Brujeria on U.S. dates and embarked on "Xenosapien World Tour", which started in continental Europe on May 4, continued in United Kingdom and Ireland in May and resumed in the "Summer Slaughter" trek (dubbed the "Summer's Laughter" by band members) across the U.S. throughout June and July with Decapitated among others. The band filmed a music video for the song "Endless Cycle of Violence". On November 20, 2007, the band's van was robbed. Their "recent earnings from the tour (close to $4,000), a laptop with more than $2,000 in music-software programs loaded, an iPod and various personal items" were stolen.

Cephalic Carnage reissued Conforming to Abnormality under Relapse Records on April 29, 2008. They participated in a "mini-tour" of Japan in May 2009, performing in Osaka, Nagoya, and Tokyo. In June 2009, Cephalic Carnage, along with Cattle Decapitation and Withered, pulled out of the Blackenedfest tour due to organization problems and said they were "getting on with writing the next full length, (...) as well as finishing construction of our late night poutine stand, where we will serve country-fried giraffe eggs and your favorite French-Canadian specialty." In October 2009, the band released a music video for the song "Vaporized" while writing a new album and announced a concert DVD entitled Live at Your Mom's House.

Cephalic Carnage began recording their new album, Misled by Certainty, in May 2010. It was released August 31, 2010 by Relapse Records. They reissued Lucid Interval on September 13, 2011.

== Musical style ==
AllMusic describes the style of Cephalic Carnage as "crazy concoction of truly experimental grindcore, death metal, and jazz". Their music varies from deathgrind, technical death metal, occasional surf rock, instrumental, to flamenco interludes or violin-and-sax ambient jams. Their early style is typically progressive and technically proficient, with some comedic songs. Their later work developed into a more experimental, complex direction.

Cephalic Carnage is also known for its humorous songs. Popmatters points out some examples: "On past albums, the band has taken satirical swipes at the overtly image-oriented black metal ("Black Metal Sabbath") and the oversaturated, angst-ridden metalcore sound ("Dying Will Be the Death of Me"), and even in live settings, they're not above taking the odd spontaneous piss-take to bring some levity to a situation. One notorious YouTube clip has a fight starting in the pit at a Cephalic show in Toronto, and in an inspired moment, the band launches into a rousing excerpt from "Eye of the Tiger", to a raucous ovation from the kids."

== Members ==
- Leonard Leal – lead vocals (1992–2010, 2015, 2022–present)
- John Merryman – drums (1996–2010, 2015, 2022–present)
- Steve Goldberg – rhythm guitar (1996–2010, 2015, 2022–present)
- Nick Schendzielos – bass, backing vocals (2006–2010, 2015, 2022–present)
- Brian Hopp – lead guitar (2009–2010, 2015, 2022–present)

- Zac Joe – lead guitar (1992–2009)
- Anthony Chavez – drums (1992–1996)
- Tom Clenin – bass (1992–1996; died 2020)
- Doug Williams – bass (1996–1998)
- Howard Hubbard – bass (1998–1999)
- Jawsh Mullen – bass (1999–2006)

== Discography ==
=== Studio albums ===
- Conforming to Abnormality (1998)
- Exploiting Dysfunction (2000)
- Lucid Interval (2002)
- Anomalies (2005)
- Xenosapien (2007)
- Misled by Certainty (2010)

=== Extended plays ===
- Halls of Amenti (2002)
- Digital Carnage (2005)

=== Demos ===
- Scrape My Lungs (1994)
- Fortuitous Oddity (1996)
- Promo 1997 (1997)

=== Splits ===
- Cephalic Carnage / Adnauseam (1998)
- Impaled / Cephalic Carnage (1999)
- Perversion... and the Guilt After / Version 5.Obese (2002)
- HF Seveninches Collection Vol. 1 (2008)
