= Exploiting Dysfunction =

Studio album by Cephalic Carnage
- Released: April 18, 2000
- Recorded: Festival Studios, Kenner, Louisiana
- Genre: Deathgrind, avant-garde metal
- Length: 74:02
- Label: Relapse

Cephalic Carnage chronology
Impaled / Cephalic Carnage (1999)	Exploiting Dysfunction (2000)	Lucid Interval (2002)

Professional ratings
Review scores
Source	Rating
CMJ	favorable
Exclaim!	favorable

Exploiting Dysfunction is Cephalic Carnage's second full-length album. It was released on April 18, 2000, by Relapse Records.

== Track listing ==
No.	Title	Length
1.	"Hybrid"	4:17
2.	"Driven to Insanity"	1:06
3.	"Rehab"	5:50
4.	"Observer to the Obliteration of Planet Earth"	3:12
5.	"On Six"	0:06
6.	"Gracias"	5:02
7.	"Cryptosporidium"	4:27
8.	"The Ballad of Moon"	1:50
9.	"9' of Smoke"	3:13
10.	"Warm Hand on a Cold Night (A Tale of Onesomes)"	0:11
11.	"Invertus Indica (The Marijuana Convictions)"	4:44
12.	"Molestandos Plantas Muertos!"	1:11
13.	"Eradicate Authority"	5:52
14.	"Paralyzed by Fear"	1:39
15.	"Exploiting Dysfunction"	15:26
16.	Untitled	0:11
17.	Untitled	0:13
18.	Untitled	0:16
19.	Untitled	0:13
20.	Untitled	0:14
21.	Untitled	0:17
22.	Untitled	0:13
23.	"The Apothecary (An Ode to Tom Forcade)"	1:19
24.	Untitled	0:14
25.	Untitled	0:12
26.	Untitled	0:07
27.	Untitled	0:07
28.	Untitled	0:11
29.	Untitled	0:09
30.	Untitled	0:08
31.	Untitled	0:18
32.	Untitled	0:21
33.	Untitled	0:19
34.	Untitled	0:22
35.	Untitled	0:13
36.	Untitled	0:14
37.	Untitled	0:14
38.	Untitled	0:16
39.	Untitled	0:15
40.	Untitled	0:14
41.	Untitled	0:15
42.	Untitled	0:14
43.	Untitled	0:15
44.	Untitled	0:10
45.	Untitled	0:10
46.	Untitled	0:09
47.	Untitled	0:09
48.	Untitled	0:09
49.	Untitled	0:09
50.	Untitled	0:09
51.	Untitled	0:09
52.	Untitled	0:10
53.	Untitled	0:10
54.	Untitled	0:09
55.	Untitled	0:10
56.	Untitled	0:10
57.	Untitled	0:09
58.	Untitled	0:09
59.	Untitled	0:10
60.	Untitled	0:10
61.	Untitled	0:12
62.	Untitled	0:10
63.	Untitled	0:19
64.	Untitled	0:27
65.	Untitled	0:30
66.	Untitled	3:35

== Personnel ==
- Lenzig Leal – vocals
- Zac Joe – guitar
- John Merryman – drums
- Steve Goldberg – guitar
- Jawsh Mullen – bass
