= Anomalies (album) =

Studio album by Cephalic Carnage
- Released: March 15, 2005
- Recorded: November – December 2004
- Genres: Deathgrind, technical death metal
- Length: 45:45
- Label: Relapse
- Producer: Dave Otero

Cephalic Carnage chronology
Halls of Amenti (2002)	Anomalies (2005)	Xenosapien (2007)

Professional ratings
Review scores
Source	Rating
Blabbermouth.net	9/10 stars
CMJ	favorable
Exclaim!	favorable
Pitchfork Media	7/10
PopMatters	7/10 stars
Stylus Magazine	A−

Anomalies is Cephalic Carnage's fourth full-length album. It was released on Relapse Records. A video was released for the album's single, "Dying Will Be the Death of Me". The song is a parody of American metalcore.

Anomalies was released on CD and 12" vinyl format. It was recorded from November to December 2004.

== Track listing ==
No.	Title	Length
1.	"Scientific Remote Viewing"	2:18
2.	"Wraith"	2:50
3.	"Counting the Days"	3:54
4.	"The Will or the Way"	2:10
5.	"Piecemaker"	5:35
6.	"Enviovore"	3:01
7.	"Dying Will Be the Death of Me"	4:41
8.	"Inside Is Out"	3:54
9.	"Sleeprace"	2:45
10.	"Kill for Weed"	2:17
11.	"Litany of Failure"	2:25
12.	"Ontogeny of Behavior"	9:49

== Personnel ==
=== Cephalic Carnage ===
- Lenzig Leal – vocals
- Zac Joe – guitar
- John Merryman – drums
- Steve Goldberg – guitar
- Jawsh Mullen – bass

=== Additional personnel ===
- Dave Otero – vocals on "Dying Will Be the Death of Me", production
- Travis Ryan (Cattle Decapitation) – vocals on "Scientific Remote Viewing"
- Barney Greenway (Napalm Death) – vocals on "The Will or the Way"
- John Gallagher (Dying Fetus) – additional vocals
- Corporate Death (Macabre) – vocals on "Sleeprace"
- Brian Hegman (Black Lamb) – vocals on "Ontogeny of Behavior"
- Matt Blanks – violin, noises
- Evan Sydney Leal – violin
