= Allegaeon =

American metal band

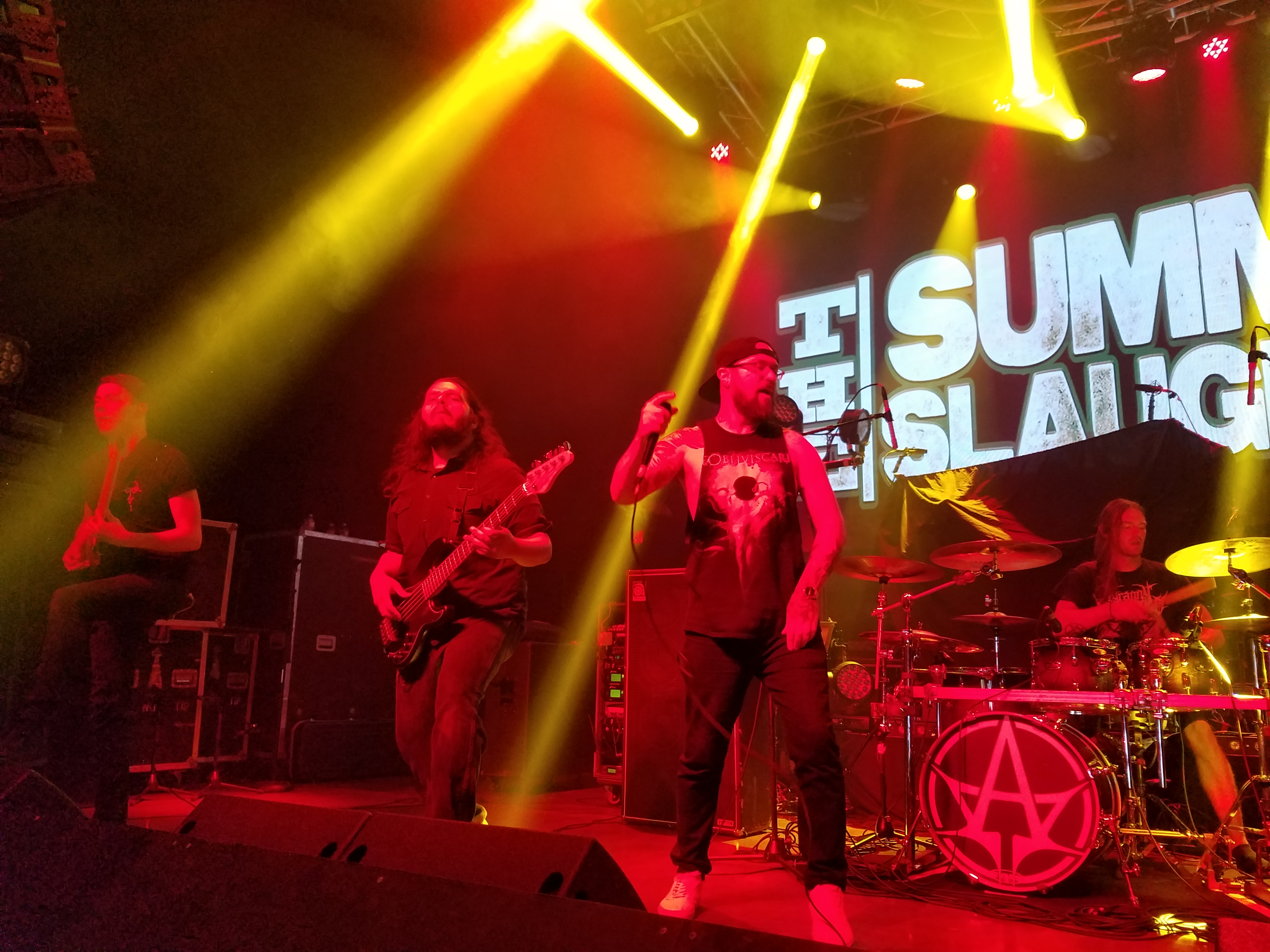
- Allegaeon performing in 2018

Background information
- Origin: Fort Collins, Colorado, U.S.
- Genres: Technical death metal, melodic death metal
- Years active: 2008–present
- Label: Metal Blade
- Members: Greg Burgess; Michael Stancel; Brandon Michael; Jeff Saltzman; Ezra Haynes
- Past members: Jordan Belfast; Ryan Glisan; Corey Archuleta; Brandon Park; Riley McShane
- Website: metalblade.com/allegaeon/

Allegaeon (/əˈliːdʒən/ ə-LEE-jən) is an American death metal band from Fort Collins, Colorado, formed in 2008. They have released one EP and seven studio albums, and are currently signed to Metal Blade Records.

== History ==
Allegaeon was formed in 2007. They initially played small shows at bars and houses in and around Fort Collins. In August 2008, they independently released a self-titled EP. Soon after, they signed with Metal Blade Records. In January 2010, Allegaeon entered the studio to record their debut album, Fragments of Form and Function. The album was released on July 20, 2010, through Metal Blade. In December 2011, Allegaeon went to Lambesis Studios in San Diego, California, to record their second full-length album, Formshifter. Formshifter was released on May 8, 2012, through Metal Blade. In 2013, founding guitarist Ryan Glisan collaborated on a project with Tim Lambesis and left the band shortly thereafter. He was replaced by Michael Stancel.

Their third full-length album, titled Elements of the Infinite, was released on June 24, 2014, through Metal Blade. The album received significant praise, with Gregory Heaney of AllMusic calling it a "creative breakthrough" and commending "the dazzling guitar work" and "epic orchestral flourishes." In 2015, original vocalist Ezra Haynes departed Allegaeon without citing a specific reason, though it was made clear that his departure was not due to internal band issues. Riley McShane was immediately selected to take over as vocalist and received a positive reaction from fans.

In September 2016, Allegaeon released Proponent for Sentience, the first album featuring Riley, which was considered their finest work to date. The album received widespread acclaim and was critically noted for its significance in modern metal. It features guest vocals by Björn Strid of Soilwork and guitar work by Benjamin Ellis of Scar Symmetry.

In October 2016, longtime bass player Corey Archuleta announced he would be leaving the band at the end of the year to focus on his law career. During this time, the band also stated that they had incurred a large amount of debt and were unsure how much longer they could continue. Because of this financial stress, the band launched a fan club through the Patreon platform and have since focused on continuing to tour and write their next album.

Also during 2016, Allegaeon shot studio play-through videos for the songs "Gray Matter Mechanics" and their cover of the Rush song "Subdivisions," as well as an official video in California for the song "Of Mind and Matrix."

The band released a cover of Rush's song "Animate" as a single on January 5, 2018; the cover was recorded during the Proponent for Sentience sessions. Allegaeon embarked on their first European tour later that year as a supporting act for Ne Obliviscaris.

In January 2019, Allegaeon announced a release date for their new album, Apoptosis, and released a music video for the single "Stellar Tidal Disruption." Apoptosis was released on April 19, 2019, through Metal Blade.

On April 3, 2020, the band released a cover of the 1971 song "Roundabout" by British progressive rock band Yes.

On October 27, 2021, they announced their new album Damnum with the release of its first single, "Into Embers." The album was released on February 25, 2022. Damnum was well received by critics and was named among the top 50 best rock and metal albums of 2022 by Loudwire.

On August 24, 2022, vocalist Riley McShane announced his departure from the band. On September 13, the band recruited original vocalist Ezra Haynes to perform with them on their upcoming European tour. On October 18, 2023, the band released a new single, "Inhumation," and announced that Ezra had formally rejoined the band on a permanent basis.

On March 27, 2024, the band released a second single, "Iridescent," accompanied by a music video the band's label described as "absolutely unhinged." A month later, the band embarked on the "Cancer Culture Over North America Tour 2024" alongside Decapitated, Septicflesh, and Kataklysm.

On February 12, 2025, the band released a new single, "Driftwood," and announced their seventh album, The Ossuary Lens, which was released on April 4, 2025.

== Musical style and lyrical themes ==
Allegaeon combines different styles and is often referred to as technical melodic death metal. They also draw influence from classical music, progressive metal, and thrash metal. Lyrically, they explore scientific themes, addressing topics such as the theory of evolution, biology, physics, cryonics, dyson spheres, the probability of alien life in the universe, stem cell research, and artificial intelligence. Allegaeon is also noted for their technicality, but by the time Elements of the Infinite was released, they had begun incorporating more melodic elements into their music.

== Tours ==
Allegaeon has toured and played shows with other prominent bands, such as Job for a Cowboy, Darkest Hour, and in 2014, they had their most intense touring schedule to date. In August, they embarked on a nationwide tour entitled "The Artery Metal Tour," supporting Chimaira and The Plot in You. Immediately after, in September 2014, Allegaeon played a string of shows directly supporting Arsis on the band's 10th Anniversary Tour. In the spring of 2015, the band toured with The Agonist and Product of Hate, and played SXSW with Norma Jean. Additionally, Allegaeon co-headlined a large tour with Act of Defiance, a metal supergroup featuring members of Megadeth, including guitarist Chris Broderick. In 2016, Allegaeon also played the Ozzfest Meets Knotfest festival in San Bernardino, California and the Winter Warriors tour alongside Battlecross and Necromancing the Stone. The band started off 2017 by performing multiple sets on the 70,000 Tons of Metal cruise festival and followed up by performing on Metal Blade Records' 35th Anniversary tour with Whitechapel, Cattle Decapitation, and Goatwhore.

== Band members ==
Current members

- Greg Burgess – guitars (2008–present)
- Michael Stancel – guitars, backing vocals (2013–present)
- Brandon Michael – bass, backing vocals (2017–present)
- Jeff Saltzman – drums (2021–present)
- Ezra Haynes – lead vocals (2008–2015, 2022–present)

Former members

- Corey Archuleta – bass, backing vocals (2008–2016)
- Ryan Glisan – guitars (2008–2013)
- Jordan Belfast – drums (2008–2011)
- J. P. Andrande – drums (2011–2013)
- Brandon Park – drums (2013–2020)
- Riley McShane – lead vocals (2015–2022)

Touring/session musicians

- J. P. Andrande – drums (2011–2013)

Timeline

== Discography ==
Studio albums

Year	Title	Label	Chart peaks				
Year	Title	Label	US Heat.	US Hard Rock	US Rock	US Indie	US Sales
2010	Fragments of Form and Function	Metal Blade Records	—	—	—	—	—
2012	Formshifter	Metal Blade Records	29	—	—	—	—
2014	Elements of the Infinite	Metal Blade Records	11	25	—	—	—
2016	Proponent for Sentience	Metal Blade Records	6	11	33	29	—
2019	Apoptosis	Metal Blade Records	2	6	15	13	66
2022	Damnum	Metal Blade Records	35	6	23	20	100
2025	The Ossuary Lens	Metal Blade Records	—	—	—	—	—

EPs

Year	Title	Label
2008	Allegaeon	Self-released

=== Singles ===
Year	Song	Album
2010	"A Cosmic Question"	Fragments of Form and Function
2011	"Biomech - Vals No. 666"	Fragments of Form and Function
2012	"Tartessos: The Hidden Xenocryst"	Formshifter
2012	"Behold (God I Am)"	Formshifter
2012	"A Path Disclosed"	Formshifter
2014	"1.618"	Elements of the Infinite
2014	"Our Cosmic Casket"	Elements of the Infinite
2014	"Threshold of Perception"	Elements of the Infinite
2016	"Gray Matter Mechanics"	Proponent for Sentience
2016	"Proponent for Sentience III"	Proponent for Sentience
2016	"Subdivisions" (Rush cover)	Proponent for Sentience
2018	"Animate" (Rush cover)	non-album single
2019	"Stellar Tidal Disruption"	Apoptosis
2019	"Extremophiles (B)"	Apoptosis
2019	"Colors of the Currents"	Apoptosis
2020	"Roundabout" (Yes cover)	non-album single
2021	"Into Embers"	Damnum
2023	"Inhumation"	non-album single
2024	"Iridescent"	non-album single

=== Music videos ===
Year	Song	Director
2011	"Biomech - Vals No. 666"	
2012	"A Path Disclosed"	
2014	"1.618"	Deja Low and Lance Rohr
2014	"Our Cosmic Casket"	Flow Forum Productions
2014	"Threshold of Perception"	Ezra Haynes
2016	"All Hail Science"	Vince Edwards
2017	"Of Mind and Matrix"	Nick Hipa
2019	"Stellar Tidal Disruption"	Robert Graves
2019	"Extremophiles (B)"	Vince Edwards
2019	"Colors of the Currents"	Matthew Zinke
2019	"Metaphobia"	Matthew Zinke
2021	"Into Embers"	Kyle Lamar
2022	"Of Beasts and Worms"	Kyle Lamar
2022	"Vermin"	Kyle Lamar
2022	"Called Home"	Kyle Lamar
2024	"Iridescent"	K. Hunter Lamar
