= Elements of the Infinite =

Studio album by Allegaeon
- Released: June 24, 2014
- Genre: Melodic death metal; technical death metal
- Length: 58:01
- Label: Metal Blade
- Producer: Dave Otero

Allegaeon chronology
Formshifter (2012)	Elements of the Infinite (2014)	Proponent for Sentience (2016)

Singles from Elements of the Infinite
- 1. "1.618" Released: May 6, 2014; 2. "Our Cosmic Casket" Released: June 19, 2014; 3. "Threshold of Perception" Released: December 19, 2014

Professional ratings
Review scores
Source	Rating
About.com	4.5/5 stars
AllMusic	4/5 stars
Metal Injection	Positive

Elements of the Infinite is the third studio album by American death metal band Allegaeon. The album was released on June 24, 2014 through Metal Blade Records. This is the band's first release with guitarist Michael Stancel and drummer Brandon Park, and last with original vocalist Ezra Haynes before his departure in 2015, although he rejoined the band in 2022.

== Track listing ==
All tracks are written by Allegaeon.

No.	Title	Length
1.	"Threshold of Perception"	6:06
2.	"Tyrants of the Terrestrial Exodus"	4:18
3.	"Dyson Sphere"	4:47
4.	"The Phylogenesis Stretch"	4:18
5.	"1.618"	4:17
6.	"Gravimetric Time Dilation"	5:26
7.	"Our Cosmic Casket"	5:05
8.	"Biomech II"	5:17
9.	"Through Ages of Ice - Otzi's Curse"	5:39
10.	"Genocide for Praise" (The song "Genocide for Praise" ends at 10:07, then begins the hidden song Vals for the Vitruvian Man".)	12:50
Total length:		58:03

== Personnel ==
Allegaeon

- Ezra Haynes – lead vocals
- Greg Burgess – guitars, acoustic guitar, classical guitar, orchestration
- Michael Stancel – guitars
- Corey Archuleta – bass, backing vocals
- Brandon Park – drums

Additional personnel

- Dave Otero – engineer, mastering
- Shane Howard – editing
- Joe Ferris – arranger, composer, orchestration, sequencing
- Collin Marks – artwork
- Brian James – layout

== Charts ==
Chart (2014)	Peak position
US Heatseekers	11
US Hard Rock	25
