= Antagonist (band) =

American metalcore band

- Origin: Whittier, California, United States
- Genres: Metalcore
- Years active: 1998–2024
- Labels: Dwell, Prosthetic
- Past members: Carlos Garcia; Orlando "Lond" Garcia; Colby White; Roland Leonard; Nick Reyes; Matt Lopez; Paul Salem; David Zamora; Marcus Hill

Antagonist was an American metalcore band from Whittier, California, formed in 1998. They released numerous EPs prior to being signed with Prosthetic Records. They have released two albums while under the Prosthetic Records banner, "Exist" and "World in Decline". In 2012, Antagonist once again became an independent band and released the five-song EP, “Antagonist” (2015). In 2019, Antagonist signed with independent label Infinite Strength Records and released a two-song EP “Human Failure” on July 19. The following year, the released their last album Gone is the Light, as well as an EP titled Covered, with their final standalone single Hell on Earth in 2021. The band announced their disbandment in 2023 with their last show held on February 17, 2024.

The final line-up of the band consisted of guitarist/vocalist Carlos Garcia, drummer Orlando "Lond" Garcia, guitarist Roland Leonard and bassist Colby White.

== History ==
=== Formation, "The Architecture of Discord", Dwell Records and "An Envy of Innocence" (1998–2006) ===
Antagonist began when middle school friends Carlos Garcia, Marcus Hill and David Zamora jammed on cover tunes in the summer of 1998. That September, Garcia started his first year of high school, where he met drummer Orlando "Lond" Garcia (no relation) in his gym class. After a few months of talking, they finally set up a jam session in Lond's garage. And on November 4, 1998, the band officially formed. There were a few band names thrown around, such as Useless, Static, and Chunty Wunty and His Band of Merry Elephants, but they agreed on Antagonist after it was suggested by Zamora. Their first few shows were backyard parties and their sets consisted of mainly cover tunes by bands like Nirvana, Rage Against the Machine, and the Deftones. After two shows, the band parted ways with Zamora on guitar due to creative differences. They played their first "all originals" set in the spring of 1999 at the now-defunct Showcase Theatre in Corona, California. They continued to play as a three-piece, where they played many local shows and recorded 2 demos, the full-length "Prozac" and the "Winnetka" EP. In 2001, they added a second guitarist, Matt Lopez. As a four-piece, they recorded "Writings on the Wall" EP (2002), "Live at the Showcase" EP (2003), and "Intended to Hurt or Wound" EP (2003).

Antagonist parted ways with longtime bassist and founding member Marcus Hill after various altercations he had during their shows. Paul Salem joined the band shortly after, and they immediately recorded "Eschatology" (2004). In 2005, they recorded the "Samsara" EP, with a limited pressing of 500. Their next recording was their first proper full-length, "The Architecture of Discord" (2005). This would be their last self-released effort. 2005 was also the year Antagonist went on its first tours, first with the bands Winds of Plague and With Dead Hands Rising, and then with Winds of Plague in the winter of 2005/2006.

In 2006, Antagonist signed a one-album deal with Dwell Records. The band went into with studio with Producer Rollie Ulug (Force of Change, Graf Orlock, As Hope Dies) and on November 21, 2006, "An Envy of Innocence" was released in the USA. It was accompanied by the band's first music video for the track "The Chaos We Breathe," directed by Ritchie Valdez (Stick To Your Guns, All Shall Perish, As Blood Runs Black).

=== Prosthetic Records, "Exist", "World in Decline" and disbandment (2007–present) ===
The band toured throughout the next year or so without any major label support. In the fall of 2007, Antagonist were signed to Prosthetic Records. They entered the studio in the spring of 2008 to record their album Exist, with producer Fred Archambault. The album was released on September 30, 2008 on Prosthetic Records. In early 2009, both Matt Lopez and Paul Salem departed the band due to family and work obligations, respectively. Antagonist hired long-time friend and local guitarist Roland Leonard to fill in temporarily on guitar for the next few tours. After two tours, the band decided to make Leonard permanent. The bassist slot rotated with fill-ins, but finally in the summer of 2009, another long-time friend Nick Reyes decided to step down from his usual guitar duties and took over the role of bassist for Antagonist. The new lineup played their first show in September 2009. Antagonist returned to the studio in the spring of 2010 to record its second Prosthetic full-length, "World in Decline" with Producer Paul Miner (Throwdown, Death By Stereo, Terror). It was released on August 17, 2010, and on August 18, 2010 the band kicked off a tour in support of the album, dubbed the "Shredding Pumpkins" Tour, Antagonist joined the bands Wretched and Diskreet for a full US tour that concluded on October 13 in Tucson, Arizona.

In December 2023, the band announced they would be disbanding following a farewell show. Their final concert was held at the Chain Reaction on February 17, 2024.

== Band members ==
Final lineup

- Carlos Garcia – guitars, lead vocals (1998–2024)
- Orlando "Lond" Garcia – drums (1998–2024)
- Roland Leonard – guitars, backing vocals (2009–2024)
- Colby White – bass, backing vocals (2009–2024)

Former members

- David Zamora – guitars (1998)
- Marcus Hill – bass (1998–2003)
- Matt Lopez – guitars (2001–2009)
- Paul Salem – bass (2003–2009)

Timeline

== Discography ==
Studio albums

- The Architecture of Discord (2005)
- An Envy of Innocence (2006)
- Exist (2009)
- World in Decline (2010)
- Gone Is the Light (2020)

EPs

- Intended to Hurt or Wound (2003)
- Eschatology (2004)
- Samsara (2005)
- Antagonist (2015)
- Human Failure (2019)
- Covered (2020)

== Videography ==
Year	Title	Director
2006	"The Chaos We Breathe"	Richie Valdez

Year	Title	Director
2009	"Exist"	Orlando "Lond" Garcia
