= Dave Otero =

American music producer

- Born: 1980 or 1981 (age 44–45)
- Origin: Denver, Colorado
- Genres: Extreme metal; rock; EDM; nu metal
- Occupations: Record producer; Audio engineer
- Partner: Chelsea Lowe (engaged since 2024)
- Website: daveotero.com

Dave Otero is an American music producer known for his work with extreme metal bands, primarily through his studio, Flatline Audio.

== Early life ==
Otero's early childhood was spent in Houston, Texas, before moving to Boulder, Colorado when he was fourteen, shortly after his brother enrolled at the University of Colorado. He played in local punk bands in his youth, which included the acts Messy Hairs and Four. Otero became more interested in metal after a road trip to the Milwaukee Metal Fest. He would eventually move to Denver, and formed the band Serebus with Ivan Alcala.

Otero was introduced to audio production when he split the cost of a four-track recorder with his older brother, later using that equipment to record his own band's practices.

== Career ==
Early in Otero's career, he would record any local bands willing to hire him, supplementing his income through serving at restaurants. His first major recording came in the form of Cephalic Carnage's Lucid Interval, when Otero was 21 years old. Otero's production business became Flatline Audio, a studio based in Denver, Colorado. The studio has produced albums for multiple extreme metal bands, including Cephalic Carnage (Anomalies), Khemmis, Archspire, Tetrarch, Aborted, Allegaeon, Cobalt, Cattle Decapitation, Skinless, Primitive Man, Abigail Williams, Fallujah, and PeelingFlesh. He also teaches audio production through URM Academy courses.

Otero has produced charting albums, including Cattle Decapitation's The Anthropocene Extinction, which placed on the Billboard 200, and Allegaeon's Elements of the Infinite, which ranked on the Billboard Hard Music Chart.

In January 2026, Otero announced Flatline Fest, a music festival containing metal bands that Otero has worked with in the past, which is to be hosted at the Oriental Theater. The festival predominantly features musical artists originating from, or those who have recorded their music in, Denver. The festival is co-produced by Otero and his partner, Chelsea Lowe, and it took place on June 13 and 14, 2026.

== Personal life ==
Otero is engaged to his partner, Chelsea Lowe. The pair got engaged during a performance by Aborted at the Brutal Assault festival in 2024.
